= List of shopping malls in the United States =

This is a list of current and former notable shopping malls and shopping centers in the United States.

== Alabama ==
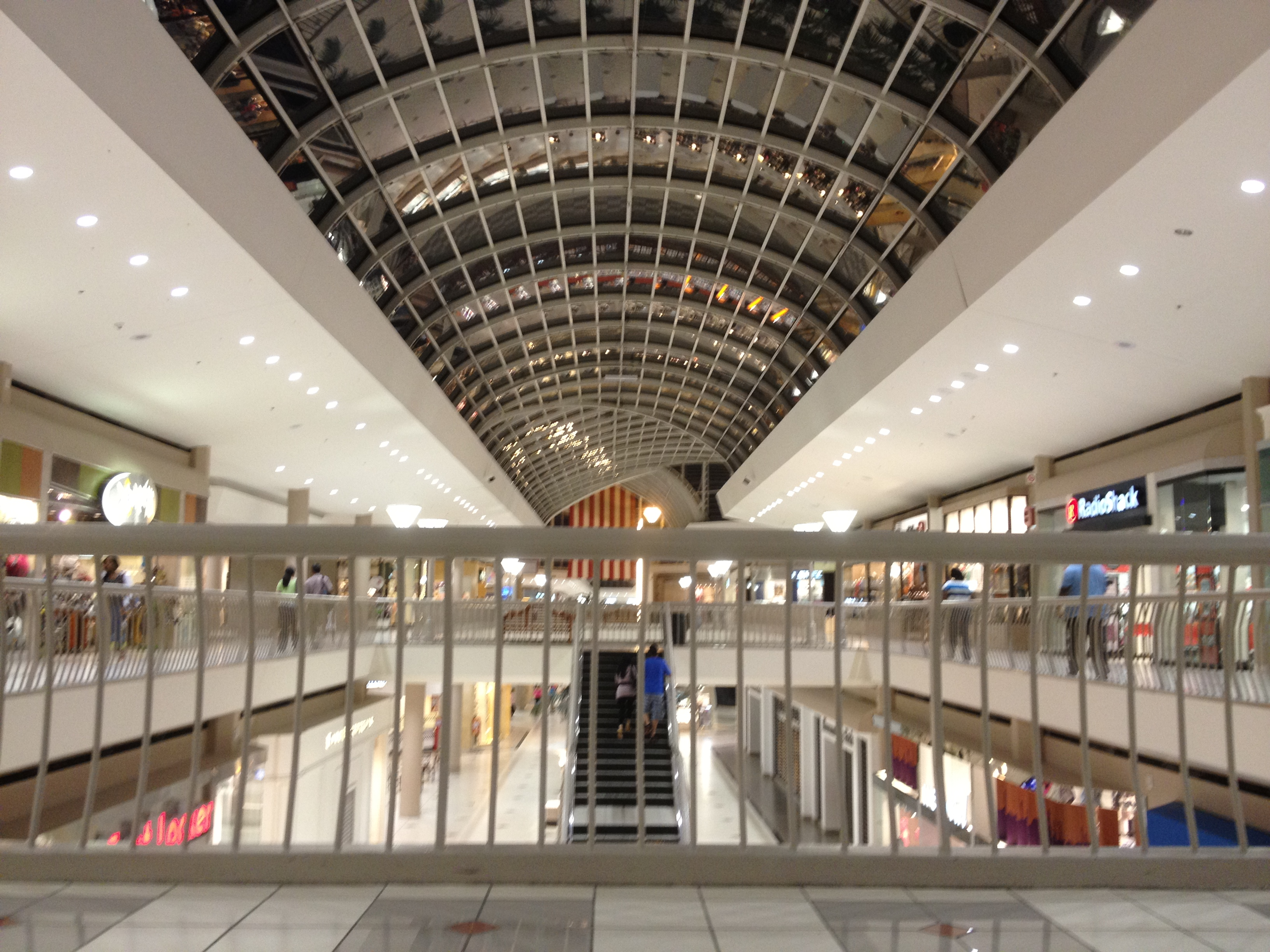
Riverchase Galleria, the largest mall in Alabama

- Auburn Mall – Auburn (1973–present)
- Bridge Street Town Centre – Huntsville (2007–present, outdoor)
- Brookwood Village – Birmingham (1973–2022)
- Century Plaza – Birmingham (1975–2009)
- Decatur Mall – Decatur (1978–present)
- Eastdale Mall – Montgomery (1977–present)
- Eastwood Village – Birmingham (2007–present); original mall: Eastwood Mall (1960–2006)
- Florence Mall – Florence (1978–present)
- Gadsden Mall – Gadsden (1974–present)
- Heart of Huntsville Mall – Huntsville (1961–2007)
- Jasper Mall – Jasper (1981–present)
- Madison Square Mall – Huntsville (1984–2017)
- The Mall at Westlake – Bessemer (1969–2009)
- McFarland Mall – Tuscaloosa (1969–2016)
- Montgomery Mall – Montgomery (1970–2008)
- Parkway Place – Huntsville (1976–present)
- Quintard Mall – Oxford (1970–present)
- Riverchase Galleria – Hoover (1986–present)
- Selma Mall – Selma (1971–present)
- The Shoppes at Bel Air – Mobile (1967–present)
- Southgate Mall – Muscle Shoals (1968–present, outdoor since 2008)
- Springdale Mall – Mobile (1984–2008)
- University Mall – Tuscaloosa (1980–present)
- Western Hills Mall – Fairfield (1969–present)
- Wiregrass Commons Mall – Dothan (1986–present)

== Alaska ==
- Anchorage 5th Avenue Mall – Anchorage (1987–present)
- Bentley Mall – Fairbanks (1977–present)
- Dimond Center – Anchorage (1977–present)
- North Point – Anchorage (2024–present) as Northway Mall (1980–2020)

== Arizona ==
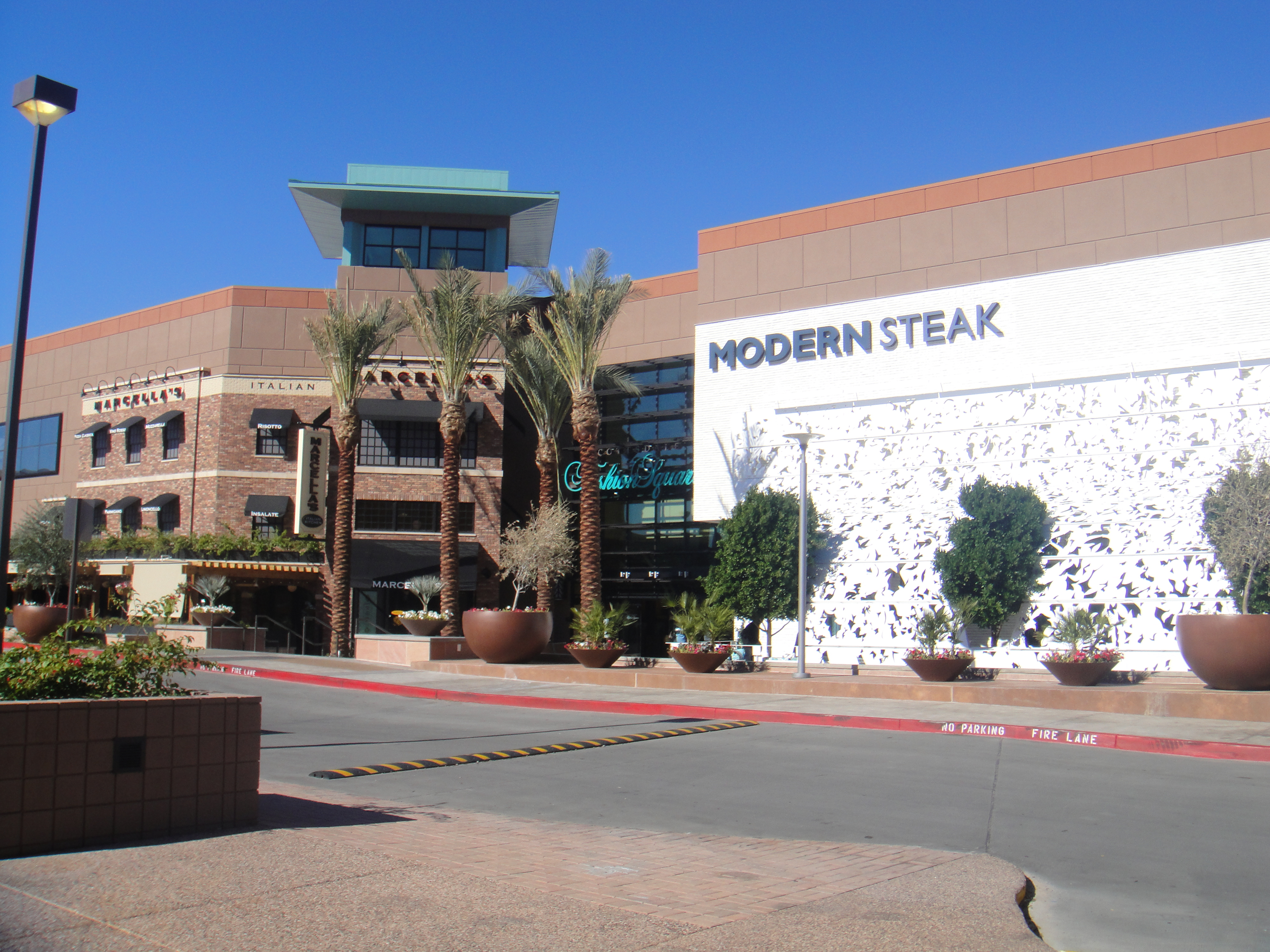
Scottsdale Fashion Square, the largest mall in Arizona

- Arizona Mills – Tempe (1997–present)
- Arrowhead Towne Center – Glendale (1993–present)
- Biltmore Fashion Park – Phoenix (1963–present, outdoor)
- Chandler Fashion Center – Chandler (2001–present)
- Christown Spectrum Mall – Phoenix (1961–present)
- Desert Ridge Marketplace – Phoenix (2001–present, outdoor)
- Desert Sky Mall – Phoenix (1981–present)
- El Con Mall – Tucson (1971–2011)
- Fiesta Mall – Mesa (1979–2018)
- Flagstaff Mall – Flagstaff (1979–present)
- Foothills Mall – Tucson (1982–2023)
- La Encantada – Tucson (2003–present, outdoor)
- Los Arcos Mall – Scottsdale (1969–1999)
- The Mall at Sierra Vista – Sierra Vista (1999–present)
- Maryvale Mall – Phoenix (1979–1998)
- Metrocenter – Phoenix (1973–2020)
- Paradise Valley Mall – Phoenix (1978–2021)
- Park Place – Tucson (1975–present)
- Pine Ridge Marketplace – Prescott (2002–present)
- Scottsdale Fashion Square – Scottsdale (1977–present)
- The Shops at Arizona Center – Phoenix (1990–present, outdoor)
- Superstition Springs Center – Mesa (1990–present)
- Tempe Marketplace – Tempe (2007–present, outdoor)
- Tri-City Pavilions – Mesa (2000–present, outdoor); original mall: Tri-City Mall (1968–1998)
- Tucson Mall – Tucson (1982–present)
- Northern Crossing – Glendale (2005–present, outdoor); original mall: Manistee Town Center (1973–2000)

== Arkansas ==
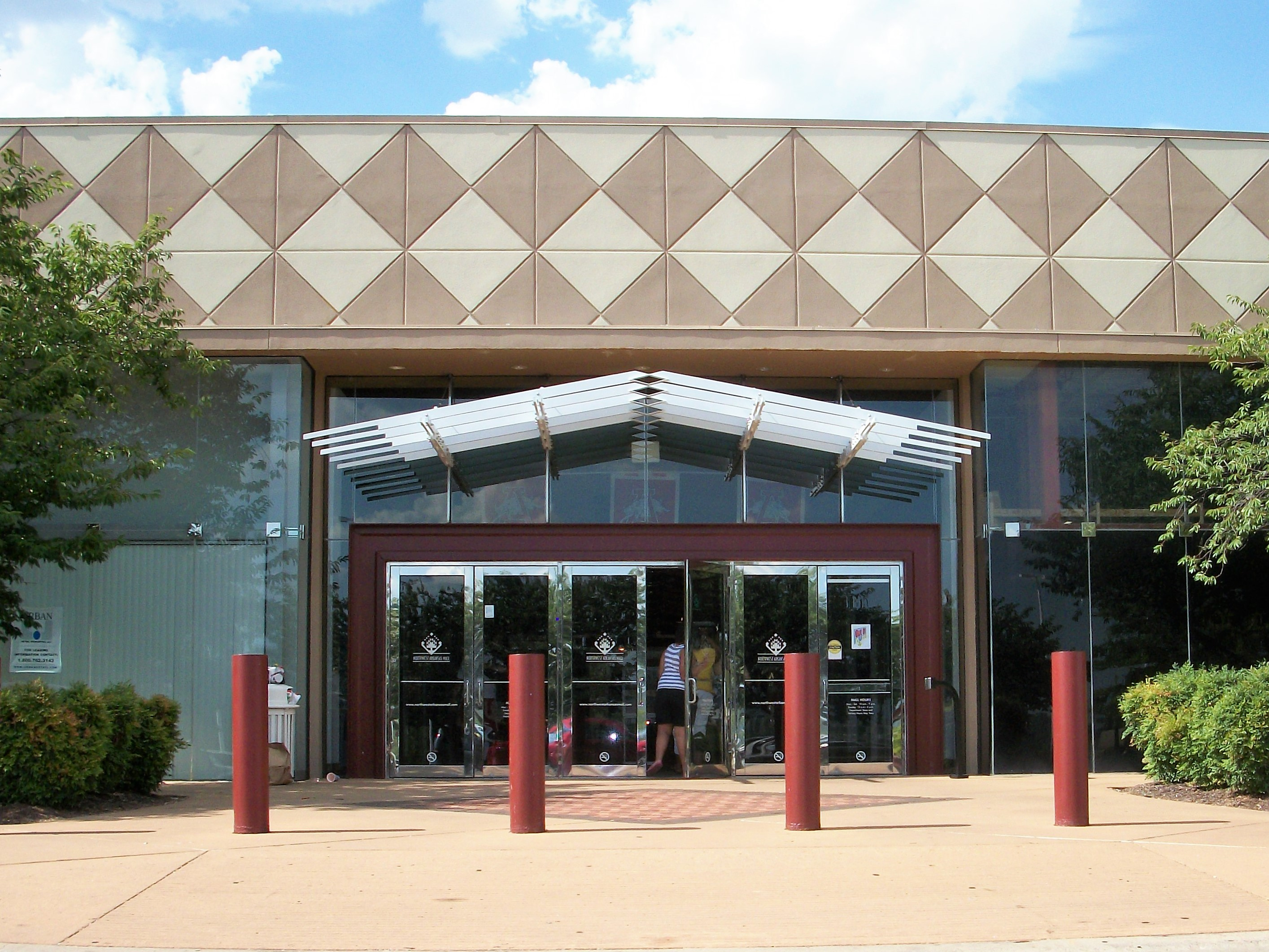
Northwest Arkansas Mall

- Central Mall – Fort Smith (1971–present)
- Indian Mall – Jonesboro (1968–2008) (demolished except Sears, which closed in 2017)
- The Mall at Turtle Creek – Jonesboro (DESTROYED 2006–2020)
- McCain Mall – North Little Rock (1973–present)
- Northwest Arkansas Mall – Fayetteville (1972–present)
- Park Plaza Mall – Little Rock (1988–present)
- Pavilion in the Park – Little Rock (1985–present)
- University Mall – Little Rock (1967–2007)

== California ==
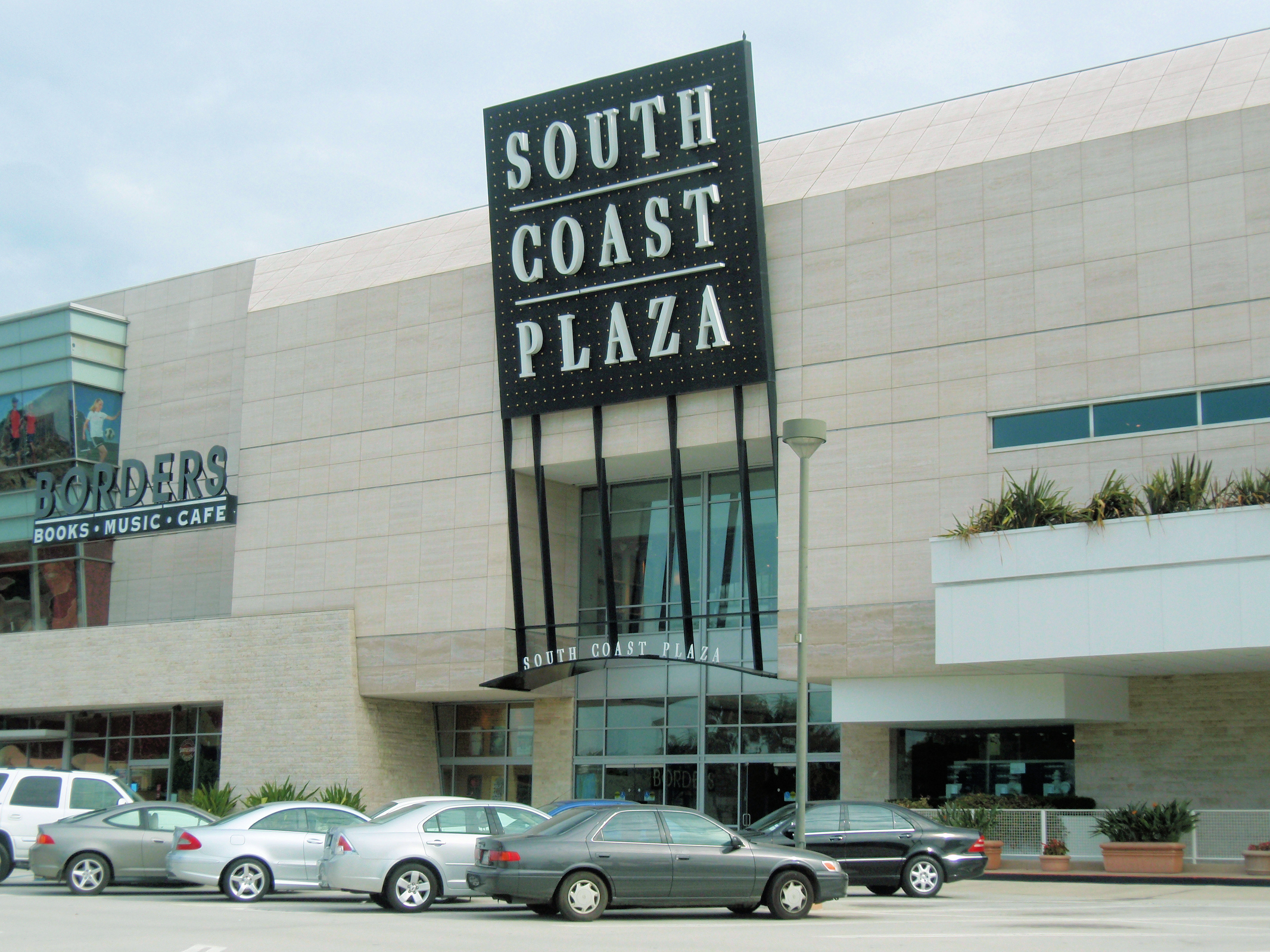
South Coast Plaza, largest mall in California and the 4th largest in the United States.

- Americana at Brand – Glendale (2008–present, outdoor)
- Anaheim GardenWalk – Anaheim (2008–present, outdoor)
- Anaheim Plaza – Anaheim (1974–present, outdoor)
- ARCO Plaza – Downtown Los Angeles (1972–present)
- Arden Fair – Sacramento (1971–present)
- Asian Garden Mall – Westminster (1987–present)
- Baldwin Hills Crenshaw Plaza – Los Angeles (1989–present)
- Barstow Mall – Barstow, California (1975–present)
- Bayfair Center – San Leandro (1977–present)
- Bayshore Mall – Eureka (1987–present)
- Beverly Center – Los Angeles (1982–present)
- Beverly Connection – Beverly Grove, Los Angeles (1989–present, outdoor)
- Brea Mall – Brea (1977–present)
- Broadway Plaza – Downtown Los Angeles (1973–present, outdoor)
- Buena Park Downtown – Buena Park (1976–present)
- Burbank Town Center – Burbank (1991–present)
- Capitola Mall – Capitola (1977–present)
- Carousel Mall – San Bernardino (1972–2017)
- Chico Marketplace – Chico (1988–present)
- Chula Vista Center – Chula Vista (1962–present, outdoor)
- Citadel Outlets – Commerce (1991–present, outdoor)
- The City Shopping Center – Orange (1970–present, outdoor)
- Coddingtown Mall – Santa Rosa (1979–present)
- Country Club Centre – Sacramento County (1970–present, outdoor)
- Del Amo Fashion Center – Torrance (1981–present)
- Del Monte Center – Monterey (1967–present, outdoor)
- Desert Fashion Plaza – Palm Springs (1967–2001)
- Downtown Plaza – Sacramento (1971–present, outdoor)
- Downtown Disney District – Anaheim (2001–present, outdoor)
- Eastland Center – West Covina (1979–present, outdoor)
- Eastmont Town Center – East Oakland (1974–present)
- Eastridge Center – San Jose (1971–present)
- El Mercado de Los Ángeles – Los Angeles (1968–present)
- Escondido Village – Escondido (1964–present, outdoor)
- Esplanade Mall – Oxnard (1970–present, outdoor)
- Fallbrook Center – West Hills, Los Angeles (1963–present, outdoor)
- Fashion Fair – Fresno (1970–present)
- Fashion Island – Newport Beach (1967–present, outdoor)
- Fashion Valley Mall – San Diego (1969–present, outdoor)
- FIGat7th – Los Angeles (1986–present, outdoor)
- Florin Mall – Parkway–South Sacramento (1968–2006)
- Galleria at Tyler – Riverside (1970–present)
- Glendale Fashion Center – Glendale (1966–1994)
- Glendale Galleria – Glendale (1976–present)
- Great Mall of the Bay Area – Milpitas (1994–present)
- Grossmont Center – La Mesa (1961–present, outdoor)
- The Grove at Farmers Market – Los Angeles (2002–present, outdoor)
- Hawthorne Plaza – Hawthorne (1977–1999)
- Hemet Valley Mall – Hemet (1980–present)
- Hillsdale Shopping Center – San Mateo (1981–present)
- Hilltop Mall – Richmond (1976–2021)
- Horton Plaza Mall – San Diego (1985–2020, outdoor)
- Huntington Center – Huntington Beach (1966–2003)
- Imperial Valley Mall – El Centro (2005–present)
- Indian Hill Village – Pomona (1982–present)
- Indio Fashion Mall – Indio (1975–2026)
- Inland Center – San Bernardino (1966–present)
- Irvine Spectrum Center – Irvine (1995–present, outdoor)
- Japan Center – Japantown, San Francisco (1968–present)
- La Cumbre Plaza – Santa Barbara (1967–present, outdoor)
- La Habra Fashion Square – La Habra (1968–present, outdoor)
- La Jolla Village Square – La Jolla (1993–present)
- La Mirada Mall – La Mirada (1975–1990)
- Laguna Hills Mall – Laguna Hills (1973–2018)
- Lakewood Center – Lakewood (1978–present)
- Las Americas Premium Outlets – San Ysidro (2001–present, outdoor)
- Laurel Plaza – North Hollywood (1968–1994)
- Long Beach Plaza – Long Beach (1982–2000)
- Los Cerritos Center – Cerritos (1971–present)
- MainPlace Mall – Santa Ana (1987–present)
- The Mall of Victor Valley – Victorville (1987–present)
- Manhattan Village – Manhattan Beach (1982–present)
- Manchester Center – Fresno (c. 1955–c. 2025; as a shopping mall) as mixed-use (c. 2025–present)
- Mayfield Mall – Mountain View (1966–1984)
- Metreon – San Francisco (1999–present)
- Mission Valley – San Diego (1961–present, outdoor)
- Montclair Place – Montclair (1968–present)
- Moreno Valley Mall – Moreno Valley (1992–present)
- Mershops Antelope Valley – Palmdale (1990–present)
- Mershops North County – Escondido (1986–present)
- Mershops Northridge – Salinas (1974–present)
- Mershops Shops at Montebello – Montebello (1985–present)
- Mershops Weberstown – Stockton (1966–present)
- NewPark Mall – Newark (1980–present)
- Northgate Mall – San Rafael (1987–present)
- Northridge Fashion Center – Northridge (1971–present)
- The Oaks – Thousand Oaks (1978–present)
- Old Towne Mall – Torrance (1972–1989)
- Old Mill Shopping Center — Mountain View (1975–1989)
- Ontario Mills – Ontario (1996–present)
- Ovation Hollywood – Los Angeles (2001–present, outdoor)
- Pacific East Mall – Richmond (1998–present)
- Pacific View Mall – Ventura (1983–present)
- Palm Springs Mall – Palm Springs (1965–2005)
- Panorama Mall – Panorama City (1980–present)
- Parkway Plaza – El Cajon (1972–present)
- Plaza Pasadena – Pasadena (1980–1998)
- Plaza West Covina – West Covina (1975–present)
- The Promenade – Woodland Hills, Los Angeles (1973–2025)
- Promenade on the Peninsula – Rolling Hills Estates (1981–1998)
- Promenade Temecula – Temecula (1999–present)
- Puente Hills Mall – City of Industry (1974–present)
- The Quad at Whittier – Whittier (1973–1987)
- Redlands Mall – Redlands (1977–2010)
- Riverside Plaza – Riverside (1984–2003)
- San Mateo Fashion Island – San Mateo (1982–1995)
- San Francisco Centre – San Francisco (1988–2026)
- Santa Maria Town Center – Santa Maria (1976–present)
- Santa Monica Place – Santa Monica (2010–present, outdoor); original indoor mall: (1980–2008)
- Santa Rosa Plaza – Santa Rosa (1983–present)
- Serramonte Center – Daly City (1969–present)
- Sherman Oaks Galleria – Sherman Oaks (1980–1999)
- Sherwood Mall – Stockton (1979–2022)
- The Shoppes at Carlsbad – Carlsbad (1969–present)
- The Shops at Mission Viejo – Mission Viejo (1979–present)
- The Shops at Palm Desert – Palm Desert (1982–present)
- The Shops at Santa Anita – Arcadia (1974–present)
- The Shops at Tanforan – San Bruno (1971–present)
- Simi Valley Town Center – Simi Valley (2005–present, outdoor)
- Solano Town Center – Fairfield (1981–present)
- Somersville Towne Center – Antioch (1989–present)
- South Bay Galleria – Redondo Beach (1985–present)
- South Coast Plaza – Costa Mesa (1967–present)
- SouthBay Pavilion – Carson (1973–present)
- Southland Mall – Hayward (1964–present)
- Stoneridge Shopping Center – Pleasanton (1980–present)
- Stonestown Galleria – San Francisco (1987–present)
- Stonewood Center – Downey (1990–present)
- Sunnyvale Town Center – Sunnyvale (1979–2018)
- Sunrise Mall – Citrus Heights (1971–present)
- Sunvalley Shopping Center – Concord (1967–present)
- Town Center at Corte Madera – Corte Madera (1985–present, outdoor)
- Universal CityWalk Hollywood – Universal City (1993–present, outdoor)
- Valencia Town Center – Santa Clarita (1992–present)
- Vallco Shopping Mall – Cupertino (1976–2024)
- Valley Plaza Mall – Bakersfield (1967–present)
- The Village at Corte Madera – Corte Madera (1985–present, outdoor)
- The Village at Orange – Orange (1971–2024)
- Vintage Faire Mall – Modesto (1977–present)
- Visalia Mall – Visalia (1964–present)
- West Valley Mall – Tracy (1995–present)
- Westfield Century City – Los Angeles (1964–present, outdoor)
- Westfield Culver City – Culver City (1977–present)
- Westfield Fashion Square – Sherman Oaks (1990–present)
- Westfield Galleria at Roseville – Roseville (2000–present)
- Westfield Oakridge – San Jose (1971–present)
- Westfield Plaza Bonita – National City (1981–present)
- Westfield Topanga – Canoga Park (1964–present)
- Westfield UTC – San Diego (1977–present, outdoor)
- Westfield Valley Fair – San Jose (1970–present)
- Westgate Center – San Jose (1975–present)
- Westminster Mall – Westminster (1974–2025)
- Westside Pavilion – West Los Angeles (1985–2019)
- Whittwood Mall – Whittier (1961–present, outdoor)
- Yuba Sutter Mall – Yuba City (1990–present)

== Colorado ==
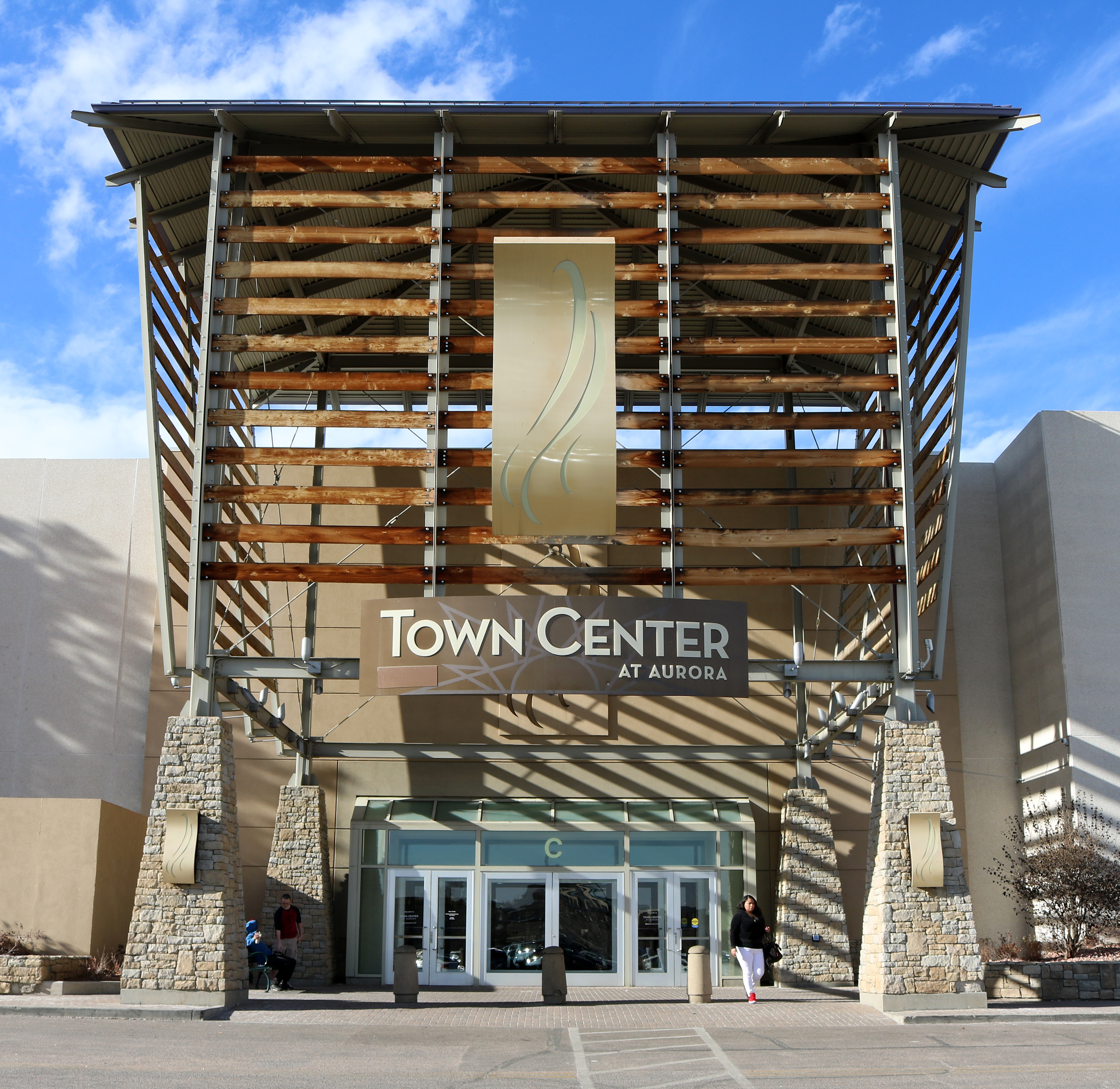
One of the entrances to the Mershops Town Center at Aurora shopping mall, located at 14200 East Alameda Avenue in Aurora, Colorado.

- Beau Monde Mall – Greenwood Village (1985–1989)
- Chapel Hills Mall – Colorado Springs (1982–present)
- Cherry Creek Shopping Center – Denver (1990–present)
- Cinderella City – Englewood (1968–1997)
- The Citadel – Colorado Springs (1972–present)
- Colorado Mills – Lakewood (2002–present)
- Crossroads Mall – Boulder (1963–2004)
- FlatIron Crossing – Broomfield (2000–present)
- The Gardens on Havana – Aurora (2009–present); original mall: Buckingham Square (1971–2007)
- Greeley Mall – Greeley (1973–present)
- Mesa Mall – Grand Junction (1980–present)
- Mershops Town Center at Aurora – Aurora (1975–present); originally Aurora Mall and Town Center at Aurora
- Park Meadows – Lone Tree (1996–present)
- Pueblo Mall – Pueblo (1976–present)
- The Shops at Foothills – Fort Collins (1973–present)
- Southglenn Mall – Centennial (1974–2006)
- Southwest Plaza – Littleton (1983–present)
- Tamarac Square – Denver (1976–2011)
- Westminster Mall – Westminster (1977–2011)

== Connecticut ==
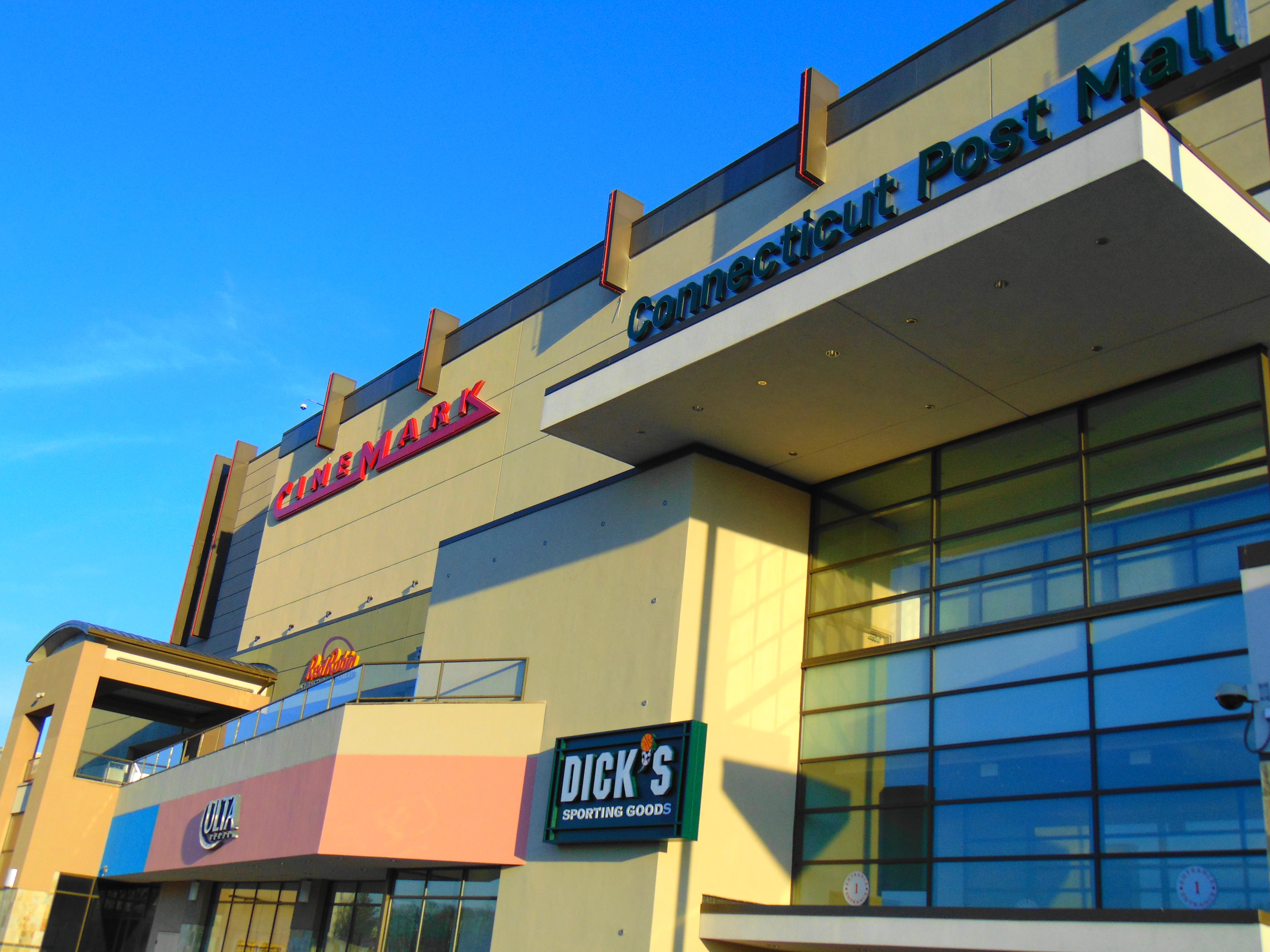
Entrance to the Connecticut Post Mall, the largest mall in Connecticut

- Brass Mill Center – Waterbury (1997–present)
- Chapel Square Mall – New Haven (1967–2002)
- Civic Center Mall – Hartford (1974–2004)
- Connecticut Post Mall – Milford (1981–present)
- Crystal Mall – Waterford (1984–2026)
- Danbury Fair – Danbury (1986–present)
- East Brook Mall – Mansfield (1975–present)
- Enfield Square – Enfield (1971–2026; anchor still open)
- Hawley Lane Mall – Trumbull (1971–present)
- Meriden Mall – Meriden (1971–present)
- The Shoppes at Buckland Hills – Manchester (1990–present)
- The SoNo Collection – Norwalk (2019–present)
- Stamford Town Center – Stamford (1982–present)
- Trumbull Mall – Trumbull (1964–present)
- Westfarms – West Hartford (1974–present)

== Delaware ==
- Blue Hen Mall – Dover (1968–1995)
- Christiana Mall – Newark (1978–present)
- Concord Mall – Wilmington (1968–present)
- Dover Mall – Dover (1982–present)
- Tri-State Mall – Claymont (1967–2015)

== Washington, D.C. ==
- DC USA – Columbia Heights (2008–present)
- Gallery Place – Chinatown (2004–present)
- L'Enfant Plaza – Southwest D.C. (1968–present)
- Mazza Gallerie – Friendship Heights (1977–2022)
- Georgetown Park – Georgetown (2013–present); original mall: The Shops at Georgetown Park (1981–2012)
- Washington Union Station Mall – Massachusetts Avenue (1988–present)
- The Shops at the National Press Building – Downtown D.C. (1984–present); original malls: eat at National Place (2005–2020) and The Shops at National Place (1984–2008)

== Florida ==
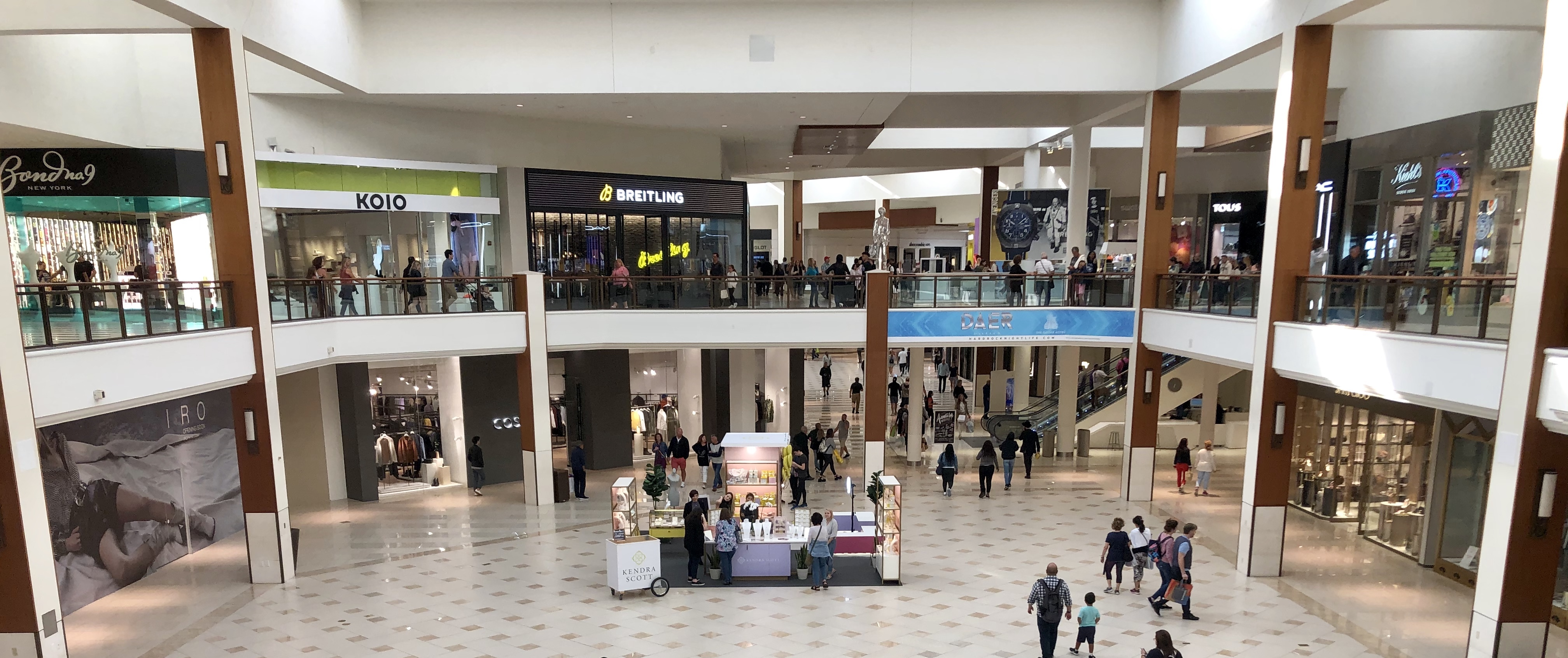
Aventura Mall, the 5th largest mall in the United States and the largest in Florida

- Altamonte Mall – Altamonte Springs (1974–present)
- Aventura Mall – Aventura (1983–present)
- The Avenues – Jacksonville (1990–present)
- The Bakery Centre – South Miami (1986–1996)
- Bal Harbour Shops – Bal Harbour (1965–present, outdoor)
- Bayside Marketplace – Greater Downtown Miami (1987–present, outdoor)
- Boynton Beach Mall – Boynton Beach (1985–2027)
- Brandon Exchange – Brandon (1995–present)
- Brevard Mall – Melbourne (1974–1997)
- Brickell City Centre – Miami (2016–present)
- Broward Mall – Plantation (1978–present)
- Centre of Tallahassee – Tallahassee (1971–present)
- Citrus Park Town Center – Citrus Park (1999–present)
- Coastland Center – Naples (1977–present)
- Colonial Plaza – Orlando (1962–1995)
- Coral Square – Coral Springs (1984–present)
- Cordova Mall – Pensacola (1971–present)
- Countryside Mall – Clearwater (1975–present)
- Cross Country Mall – West Palm Beach (1979–1997)
- Crossings at Siesta Key – Sarasota (1988–present)
- Crossroads Mall – Largo (1984–2005)
- Crystal River Mall – Crystal River (1990–2022)
- Dadeland Mall – Kendall (1971–present)
- DeSoto Square Mall – Bradenton (1973–2021)
- Dolphin Mall – Sweetwater (2001–present)
- Disney Springs – Lake Buena Vista (1975–present, outdoor)
- Eagle Ridge Mall – Lake Wales (1996–present)
- East Lake Square Mall – Tampa (1976–1998)
- Edison Mall – Fort Myers (1965–present)
- The Falls – Kendall (1980–present, outdoor)
- Fashion Mall – Plantation (1988–2006)
- Festival Bay Mall – Orlando (2002–2017)
- Festival Flea Market Mall – Pompano Beach (1986–2025)
- The Florida Mall – Orange County (1986–present)
- Gainesville Mall – Gainesville (1969–1993)
- Grande Boulevard Mall (Florida) Jacksonville (1983–1994)
- Jacksonville Landing – Downtown Jacksonville (1987–2019)
- The Galleria at Fort Lauderdale – Fort Lauderdale (1980–present)
- The Gardens Mall – Palm Beach Gardens (1988–present)
- Gateway Mall – Jacksonville (1967–2013)
- Governor's Square – Tallahassee (1979–present)
- Gulf View Square – Port Richey (1980–present)
- Hollywood Fashion Center – Hollywood (1971–1993)
- Indian River Mall – Vero Beach (1996–present)
- International Plaza and Bay Street – Tampa (2001–present)
- Lake Square Mall – Leesburg (1980–present)
- Lakeland Square Mall – Lakeland (1988–present)
- Lakes Mall – Lauderdale Lakes (1972–1995)
- Lakeshore Mall – Sebring (1992–present)
- The Mall at 163rd Street – North Miami Beach (1982–present)
- The Mall at Millenia – Orlando (2002–present)
- Mall at University Town Center – Sarasota (2014–present)
- The Mall at Wellington Green – Wellington (2001–present)
- Melbourne Square – Melbourne (1982–present)
- Merritt Square Mall – Merritt Island (1970–present)
- Miami International Mall – Doral (1983–present)
- Midway Crossings (formerly Mall of the Americas) – Miami (1970–present)
- Miracle Marketplace – Miami (1989–present)
- The Oaks Mall – Gainesville (1978–present)
- Omni International Mall – Miami (1977–2000)
- Orange Park Mall – Orange Park (1975–present)
- Orlando Fashion Square – Orlando (1973–present)
- Orlando International Premium Outlets – Orlando (2007–present, outdoor); original mall: Belz Factory Outlet World (1981–2006)
  - Orlando Outlet Marketplace (1990–present)
- Orlando Vineland Premium Outlets – Orlando (2000–present, outdoor)
- Oviedo Mall – Oviedo (1998–present)
- Paddock Mall – Ocala (1980–present)
- Palm Beach Mall – West Palm Beach (1967–2010)
- Panama City Mall – Panama City (1976–2018)
- Pembroke Lakes Mall – Pembroke Pines (1992–present)
- Pinellas Square Mall – Pinellas Park (1977–2004)
- Plantation Towne Mall – Plantation (1971–1996)
- Plaza del Sol – Kissimmee (1985–present)
- Pompano Square – Pompano Beach (1970–2006)
- Port Charlotte Town Center – Port Charlotte (1989–present)
- Regency Square Mall – Jacksonville (1967–2025)
- Santa Rosa Mall – Mary Esther (1976–2025)
- Sarasota Square Mall – Sarasota (1977–2024)
- Sawgrass Mills – Sunrise (1990–present)
  - Sawgrass Square (1996–present, outdoor)
  - The Oasis at Sawgrass Mills (1999–present, outdoor)
  - The Colonnade Outlets (2006–present, outdoor)
- Seminole Towne Center – Sanford (1995–2025)
- Southland Mall – Cutler Bay (1978–present)
- Sunshine Mall – Clearwater (1968–1998)
- The Shoppes at Harbour Island – Tampa (1985–1995)
- Shops at Seminole Hard Rock Tampa –Tampa (2019–present)
- The Shoppes at The Guitar Hotel – Hollywood (2019–present); original mall: Seminole Paradise – (2005–2017)
- Tampa Bay Center – Tampa (1976–2002)
- Town Center at Boca Raton – Boca Raton (1980–present)
- Tampa Premium Outlets – Lutz (2014–present, outdoor)
- Treasure Coast Square – Martin County (1987–present)
- Twin City Mall – North Palm Beach (1971–1991)
- Tyrone Square Mall – St. Petersburg (1972–present)
- Universal CityWalk Orlando – Orlando (1999–present, outdoor)
- University Mall – Pensacola (1974–2013)
- University Mall – Tampa (1974–present)
- Volusia Mall – Daytona Beach (1974–present)
- Waterside Shops – Naples (1992–present, outdoor)
- West Oaks Mall – Ocoee (1996–present)
- Westland Mall – Hialeah (1971–present)
- WestShore Plaza – Tampa (1967–present)
- Winter Park Mall – Winter Park (1964–1998)

== Georgia ==
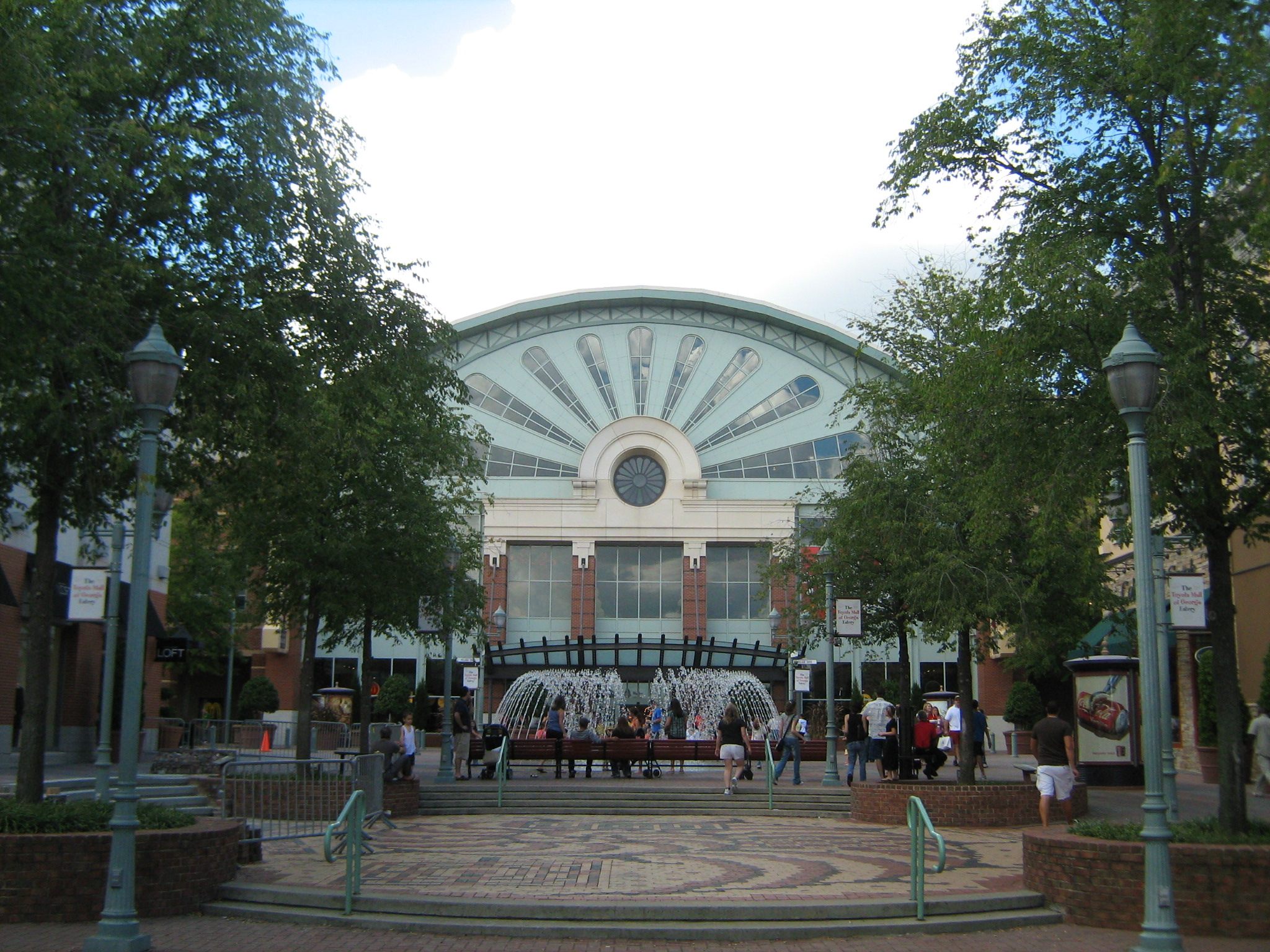
Mall of Georgia, the largest mall in the state of Georgia

- Albany Mall – Albany (1976–present)
- Arbor Place – Douglasville (1999–present)
- Augusta Mall – Augusta (1978–present)
- Avondale Mall – Avondale Estates (1964–2001)
- Cobb Center – Smyrna (1963–1995)
- Cumberland Mall – Cumberland (1973–present)
- Dalton Mall – Dalton (1980–present)
- Dublin Mall – Dublin (1972–present)
- Galleria Specialty Shops – Cobb County (1983–2025)
- Gallery at South DeKalb – Decatur (1968–present)
- Georgia Square Mall – Athens (1981–present)
- Greenbriar Mall – Atlanta (1965–present)
- Gwinnett Place Mall – Duluth (1984–2020)
- LaGrange Mall – LaGrange (1979–present)
- Lakeshore Mall – Gainesville (1970–present)
- Lenox Square – Atlanta (1973–present)
- Macon Mall – Macon (1975–present)
- The Mall at Stonecrest – Lithonia (2001–present)
- Mall of Georgia – Buford (1999–present)
- Mount Berry Mall – Rome (1991–present)
- North DeKalb Mall – Decatur (1965–2020)
- North Point Mall – Alpharetta (1993–present)
- Northlake Mall – Atlanta (1971–2026; the interior retail tenants ordered to vacate), the anchor still open.)
- Oglethorpe Mall – Savannah (1969–present)
- Peachtree Mall – Columbus (1975–present)
- Perimeter Mall – Dunwoody (1971–present)
- Phipps Plaza – Atlanta (1969–present)
- Plaza Fiesta – Brookhaven (1968–present)
- Ponce City Market – Atlanta (2014–present)
- Regency Mall – Augusta (1978–2002)
- Riverbend Mall – Rome (1975–2002)
- Roswell Mall – Roswell (1974–1994)
- Savannah Mall – Savannah (1990–2023)
- Southlake Mall – Morrow (1976–present)
- Sugarloaf Mills – Lawrenceville (2001–present)
- Town Center at Cobb – Kennesaw (1986–present)
- Underground Atlanta – Five Points, Atlanta (1989–2017)
- Union Station (Shannon Mall) – Union City (1980–2010)
- Valdosta Mall – Valdosta (1983–present)
- Westgate Mall – Macon (1961–1994)

== Guam ==
- Agana Shopping Center – Hagåtña (1978–present)
- Guam Premier Outlets – Tamuning (1997–present)
- Micronesia Mall – Dededo (1988–present)

== Hawaii ==
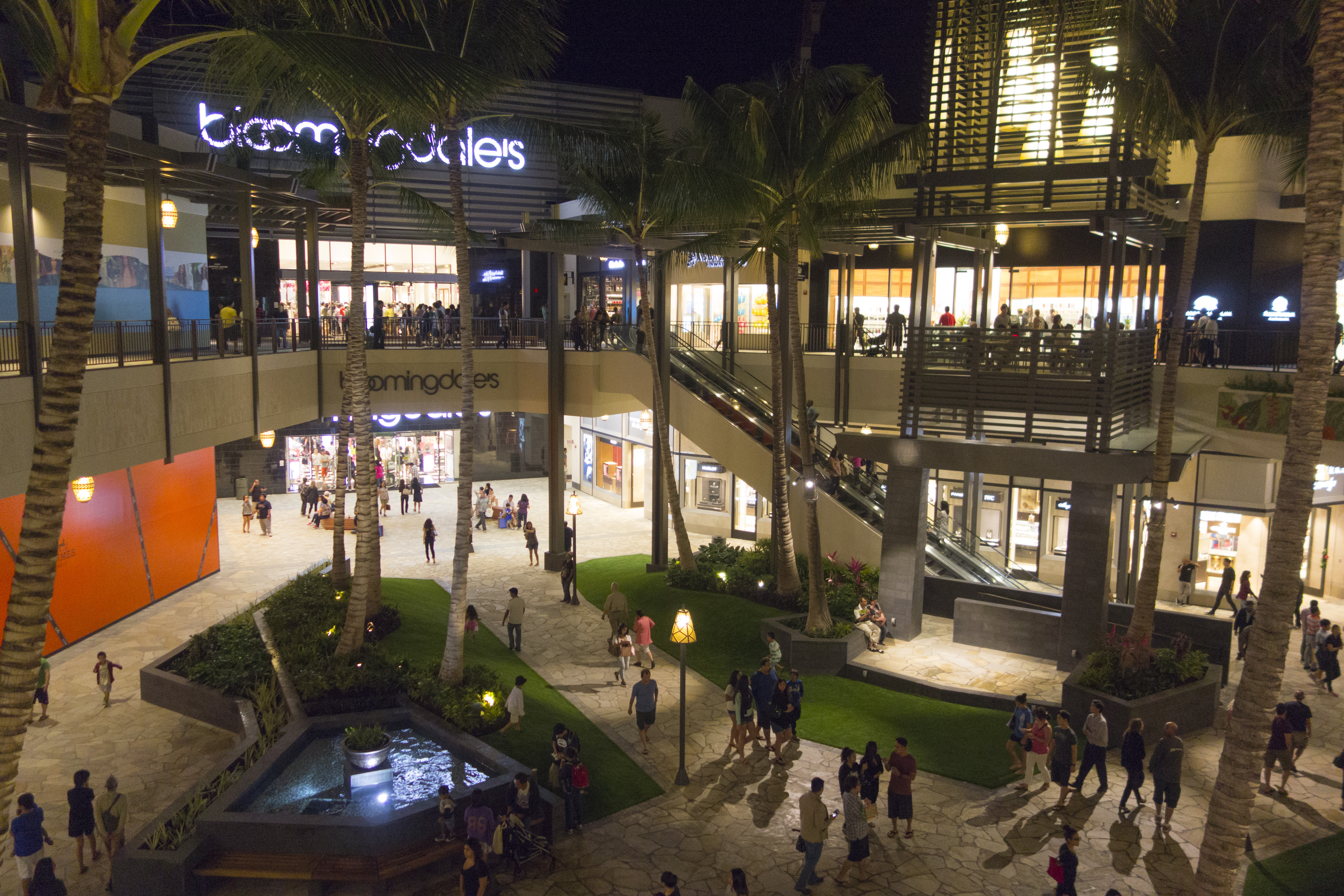
Ala Moana Center, the largest mall in Hawaii

- Ala Moana Center – Honolulu, Oahu (1959–present, outdoor)
- Aloha Tower Marketplace – Honolulu (1994–2014, outdoor)
- International Market Place – Honolulu, Oahu (2016–present, outdoor)
- Kahala Mall – Honolulu, Oahu (1970–present)
- Kukui Grove Center – Lihue, Kauai (1982–present, outdoor)
- Lahaina Cannery Mall – Lahaina, Maui (1987–present)
- Pearlridge Center – Aiea, Oahu (1972–present)
- Prince Kuhio Plaza – Hilo, Hawaii (1985–present)
- Royal Hawaiian Center – Honolulu, Oahu (1979–present, outdoor)
- Windward Mall – Honolulu, Oahu (1982–present)
- The Wharf Cinema Center – Lahaina, Maui (DESTROYED 1978–2023)
- Ward Centre – Honolulu, Oahu (1982–2026)
- Outlets of Maui – Lahaina, Maui (DESTROYED 2013–2023); original mall: Lahaina Center (1990–2013)

== Idaho ==
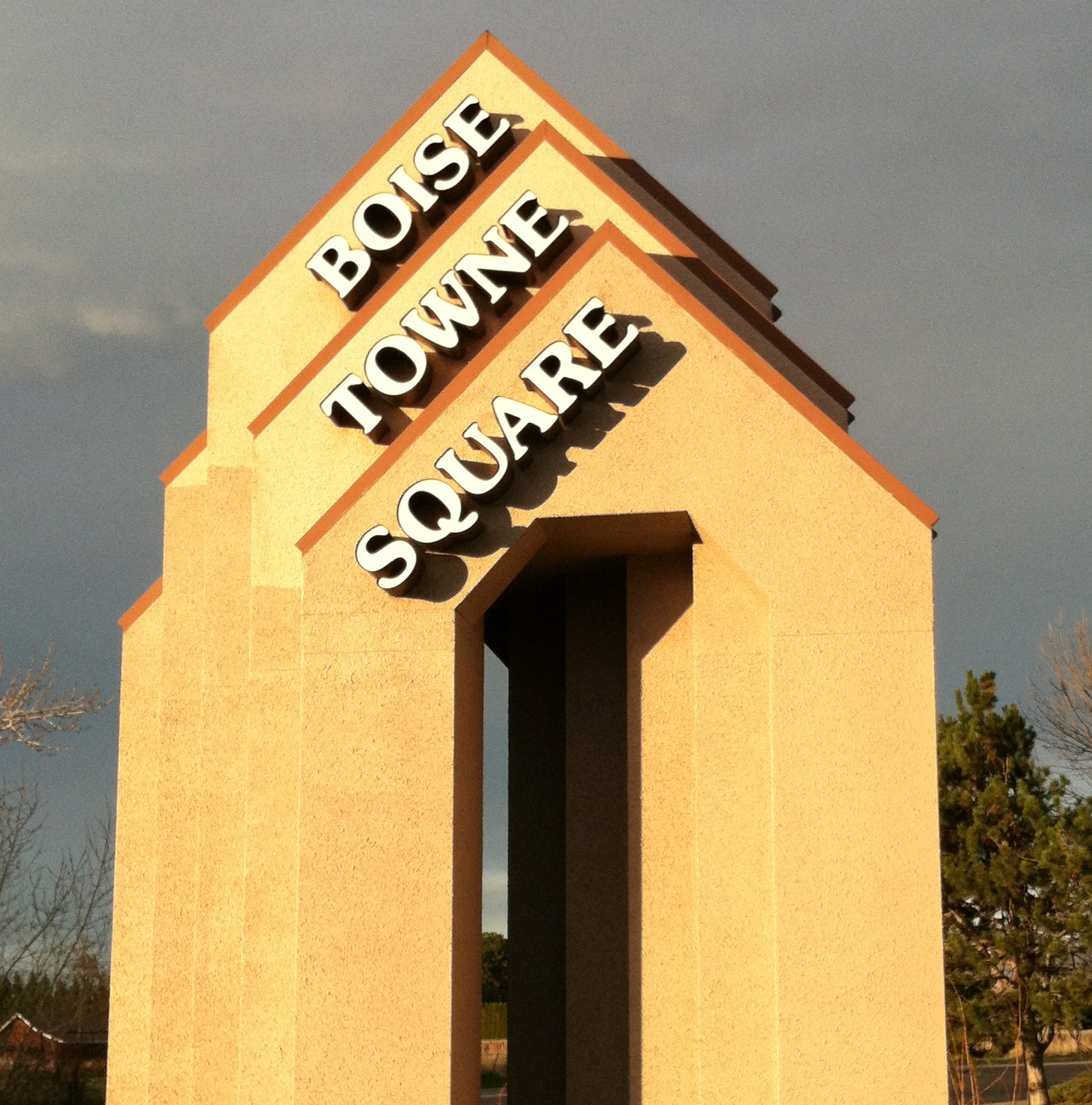
Former road sign at Boise Town Square, the largest mall in Idaho

- Boise Towne Square – Boise (1988–present)
- Grand Teton Mall – Idaho Falls (1984–present)
- Karcher Mall – Nampa (1965–present)
- Magic Valley Mall – Twin Falls (1986–present)
- Palouse Mall – Moscow (1976–present)
- Pine Ridge Mall – Chubbuck (1981–2025)
- Silver Lake Mall – Coeur d'Alene (1989–present)

== Illinois ==
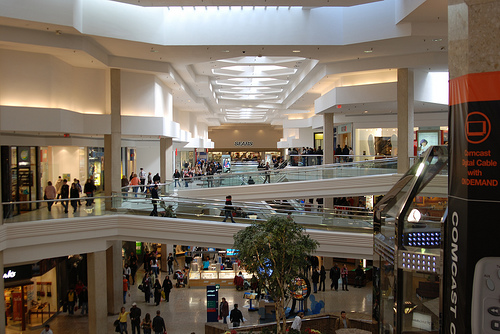
Woodfield Mall, the largest mall in Illinois

- 1800 N. Clybourn – Lincoln Park, Chicago (1989–1993)
- 900 North Michigan Shops – Chicago (1988–present)
- Algonquin Mills – Rolling Meadows (1986–1999)
- Alton Square Mall – Alton (1978–present)
- Belvidere Discount Mall – Waukegan (1965–present)
- Block 37 – Chicago (2008–present)
- Brementowne Mall – Tinley Park (1973–1994)
- The Brickyard – Chicago (1977–2003)
- Charlestowne Mall – St. Charles (1991–2017)
- Cherryvale Mall – Rockford (1973–present)
- Chicago Place – Chicago (1991–2009)
- Chicago Ridge Mall – Chicago Ridge (1981–present)
- College Hills Mall – Normal (1980–2004)
- Cross County Mall – Mattoon (1971–present)
- Crystal Point Mall – Crystal Lake (1976–1999)
- Deerbrook Mall – Deerfield (1971–2014)
- Des Plaines Mall – Des Plaines (1977–1996)
- Dixie Square Mall – Harvey (1966–1978)
- Eastland Mall – Bloomington (1967–present)
- Fashion Outlets of Chicago – Rosemont (2013–present)
- Ford City Mall – Chicago (1965–2026)
- Fox Valley Mall – Aurora (1975–present)
- Golf Mill Shopping Center – Niles (1960–present)
- Gurnee Mills – Gurnee (1991–present)
- Harlem Irving Plaza – Norridge (1956–present)
- Hawthorn Mall – Vernon Hills (1973–present)
- Hickory Point Mall – Forsyth (1978–present)
- Illinois Star Centre – Marion (1991–2018)
- James R. Thompson Center – Chicago (1985–2022)
- Jefferson Square Mall – Joliet (1975–2002)
- Lakehurst Mall – Waukegan (1971–2004)
- Lincoln Mall – Matteson (1973–2015)
- Lincoln Square Mall – Urbana (1964–present)
- Lincolnwood Town Center – Lincolnwood (1990–2026)
- Louis Joliet Mall – Joliet (1978–present)
- Machesney Park Mall – Machesney Park (1978–2003)
- Market Place Shopping Center – Champaign (1975–present)
- Navy Pier – Chicago (1995–present)
- North Park Plaza – Villa Park (1973–present)
- North Pier – Chicago (1990–2013)
- North Riverside Park Mall – North Riverside (1975–present)
- Northbrook Court – Northbrook (1976–present)
- Northfield Square – Bradley (1990–present)
- Northland Mall – Sterling (1973–present)
- Northwoods Mall – Peoria (1973–present)
- Oakbrook Center – Oak Brook (1962–present, outdoor)
- Old Chicago – Bolingbrook (1975–1980)
- One Schaumburg Place – Schaumburg (1991–1997)
- Orland Park Place – Orland Park (1981–1997)
- Orland Square Mall – Orland Park (1976–present)
- Peru Mall – Peru (1974–present)
- The Plaza – Evergreen Park (1952–2013)
- Quincy Mall – Quincy (1978–present)
- Randhurst Mall – Mount Prospect (1962–2008)
- River Oaks Center – Calumet City (1966–present)
- Sandburg Mall – Galesburg (1975–2018)
- Shops at the Mart – Chicago (1991–present)
- The Shops at North Bridge – Chicago (2000–present)
- SouthPark Mall – Moline (1974–present)
- Spring Hill Mall – West Dundee (1980–2024)
- St. Charles Mall – St. Charles (1980–1995)
- St. Clair Square – Fairview Heights (1974–present)
- Stratford Square Mall – Bloomingdale (1981–2024)
- Town & Country Mall – Arlington Heights (1981–2004)
- University Mall – Carbondale (1974–present)
- Village Mall – Danville (1975–present)
- Water Tower Place – Chicago (1976–present)
- Westfield Old Orchard – Skokie (1956–present, outdoor)
- White Oaks Mall – Springfield (1977–present)
- Woodfield Mall – Schaumburg (1971–present)
- Yorktown Center – Lombard (1968–present)

== Indiana ==
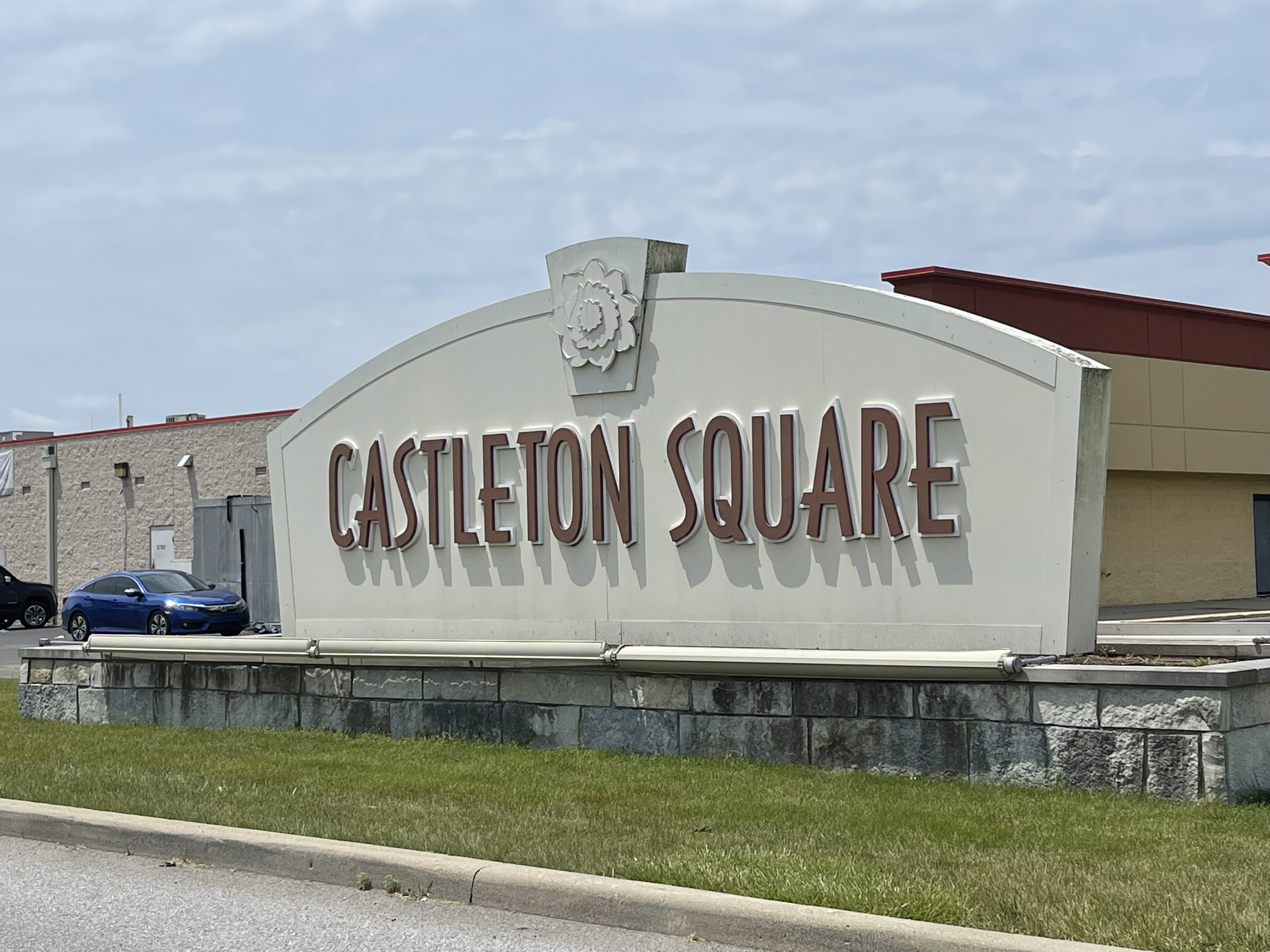
Castleton Square road sign, the largest mall in Indiana

- Castleton Square – Indianapolis (1972–present)
- Century Mall – Merrillville (1975–2006)
- Circle Centre Mall – Indianapolis (1995–2025)
- College Mall – Bloomington (1965–present)
- Concord Mall – Elkhart (1972–2023)
- Eastgate Consumer Mall – Indianapolis (1972–2004)
- Eastland Mall – Evansville (1981–present)
- The Fashion Mall at Keystone – Indianapolis (1973–present)
- Five Points Mall – Marion (1978–2019)
- Glenbrook Square – Fort Wayne (1966–present)
- Glendale Mall – Indianapolis (1970–2007)
- Green Tree Mall – Clarksville (1968–present)
- Greenwood Park Mall – Greenwood (1980–present)
- Haute City Center – Terre Haute (1970–present)
- Jefferson Pointe – Fort Wayne (2001–present)
- Kokomo Mall – Kokomo (1970–2014)
- Lafayette Square Mall – Indianapolis (1968–2022)
- Markland Mall – Kokomo (1968–present)
- Meadows Shopping Center – Terre Haute (1983–present)
- Mounds Mall – Anderson (1965–2018)
- Muncie Mall – Muncie (1970–present)
- Richmond Mall – Richmond (1966–present)
- River Falls Mall – Clarksville (1990–2005)
- Scottsdale Mall – South Bend (1973–2004)
- Southlake Mall – Merrillville (1974–present)
- Southtown Mall – Fort Wayne (1969–2003)
- Tippecanoe Mall – Lafayette (1973–present)
- University Park Mall – Mishawaka (1979–present)
- The Village Shopping Center – Gary (late 1970s–present)
- Washington Square Mall – Evansville (1963–present)
- Washington Square Mall – Indianapolis (1974–present)
- Woodmar Mall – Hammond (1966–2006)

== Iowa ==
- College Square Mall – Cedar Falls (1969–present)
- Coral Ridge Mall – Coralville (1998–present)
- Crossroads Mall – Waterloo (1970–2025)
- Jordan Creek Town Center – West Des Moines (2004–present)
- Kaleidoscope at the Hub – Des Moines (1985–2019)
- Kennedy Mall – Dubuque (1970–present)
- Lindale Mall – Cedar Rapids (1980–present)
- Mall of the Bluffs – Council Bluffs (1986–2019)
- Merle Hay Mall – Des Moines (1972–present)
- Muscatine Mall – Muscatine (1971–present)
- North Grand Mall – Ames (1971–present)
- NorthPark Mall – Davenport (1973–present)
- Old Capitol Mall – Iowa City (1981–present)
- Outlets of Des Moines – Altoona (2017–present, outdoor)
- Quincy Place Mall – Ottumwa (1990–present)
- Southern Hills Mall – Sioux City (1980–present)
- Southridge Mall – Des Moines (1975–2012)
- Valley West Mall – West Des Moines (1975–2026)
- Westdale Mall – Cedar Rapids (1979–2014)
- Westland Mall – West Burlington (1977–present)

== Kansas ==
- The Great Mall of the Great Plains – Olathe (1997–2015; demolished except for Burlington)
- Indian Springs Mall – Kansas City (1971–2016; demolished)
- Leavenworth Plaza – Leavenworth (1967–2015; demolished except for ACE Hardware and the former Sears)
- Legends Outlets Kansas City – Kansas City (2006–present, outdoor outlet mall)
- Manhattan Town Center – Manhattan (1987–present)
- Metcalf South Shopping Center – Overland Park (1967–2014; demolished except for the former Sears)
- Mission Center Mall – Mission (1989–2006; demolished)
- Oak Park Mall – Overland Park (1974–present; largest mall in Kansas and the Kansas City Metropolitan Area)
- Town Center Plaza – Leawood (1996–present, outdoor mall; former home of the only Jacobson's department store in both Kansas City and the state of Kansas)
- Towne East Square – Wichita (1975–present)
- Towne West Square – Wichita (1981–2025)
- Uptown Hutch (formerly Hutchinson Mall) – Hutchinson (1986–2026, the outdoor shop still open)
- West Ridge Mall – Topeka (1988–present)
- Wichita Mall – Wichita (1970–2003)

== Kentucky ==
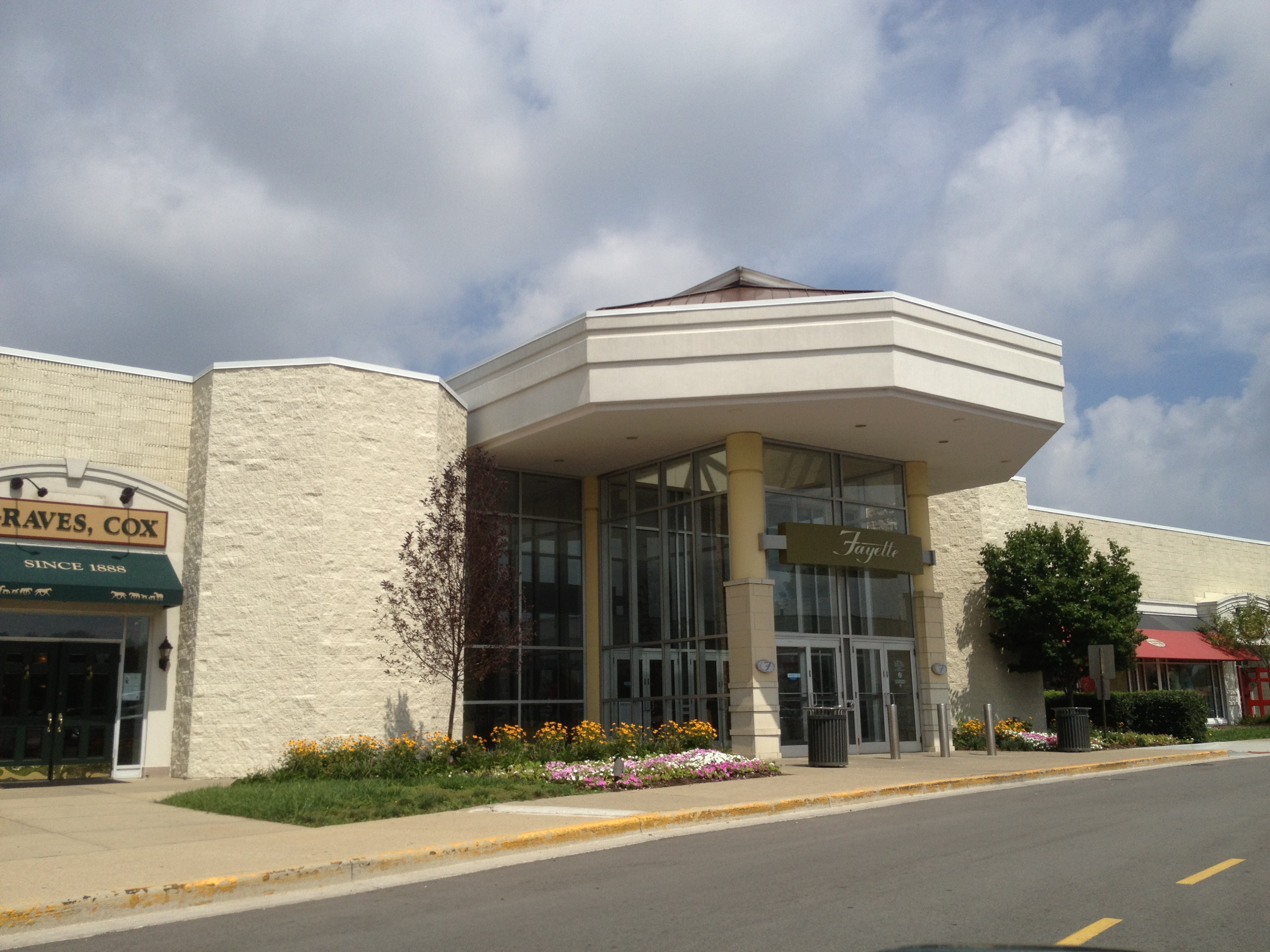
Entrance of Fayette Mall, the largest mall in Kentucky

- Ashland Town Center – Ashland (1989–present)
- Bashford Manor Mall – Louisville (1973–2003)
- Fayette Mall – Lexington (1971–present)
- Florence Mall – Florence (1976–present)
- Fourth Street Live! – Downtown Louisville (2004–present, outdoor); original malls: Louisville Galleria (1982–2003) and River City Mall (1973–1996, outdoor)
- Greenwood Mall – Bowling Green (1979–present)
- Jefferson Mall – Louisville (1978–present)
- Kentucky Oaks Mall – Paducah (1982–present)
- Kyova Mall – Ashland (1989–2021)
- Lexington Mall – Lexington (1975–2005)
- Mall at Lexington Green – Lexington (1986–present)
- Mall St. Matthews – Louisville (1962–present)
- Mid-City Mall – Louisville (1962–2026)
- Middlesboro Mall – Middlesboro (1983–present)
- Newport on the Levee – Newport (2001–present)
- Outlet Shoppes of the Bluegrass – Simpsonville (2014–present, outdoor)
- Oxmoor Center – Louisville (1971–present)
- South Side Mall – South Williamson (1981–present)
- Towne Square Mall – Owensboro (1978–2023)
- Turfland Mall – Lexington (1967–2008)

== Louisiana ==
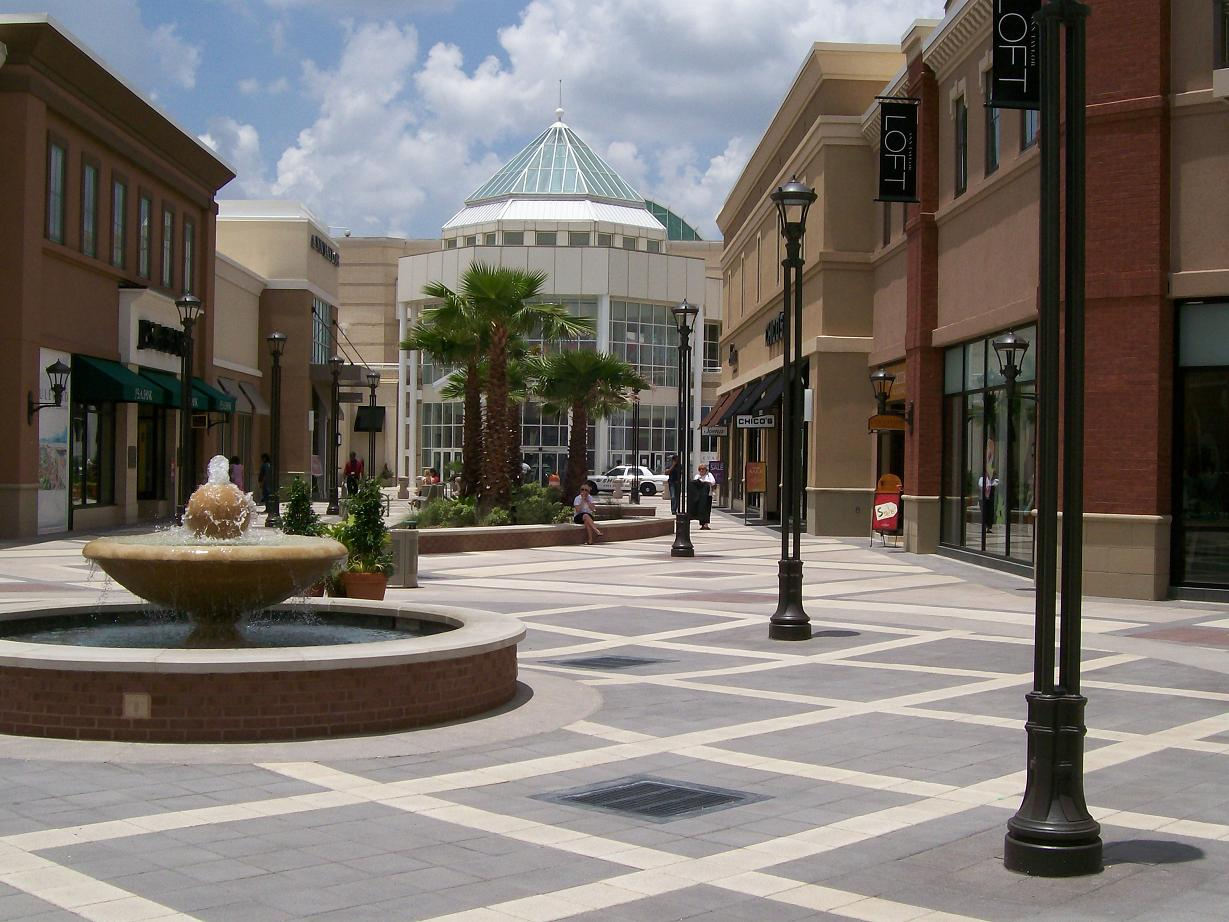
Main entrance of the Mall of Louisiana, the largest mall in the state of Louisiana

- Acadiana Mall – Lafayette (1979–present)
- Alexandria Mall – Alexandria (1973–present)
- Cortana Mall – Baton Rouge (1976–2019)
- The Esplanade – Kenner (1983–2021)
- Hammond Square Mall – Hammond (1977–2007)
- Lake Forest Plaza – New Orleans East (1974–2005)
- Lakeside Shopping Center – Metairie (1969–present)
- Mall of Louisiana – Baton Rouge (1997–present)
- Mall St. Vincent – Shreveport (1977–present)
- New Orleans Centre – New Orleans (1988–2005)
- North Shore Square – Slidell (1985–2019)
- Oakwood Center – Gretna (1966–present)
- The Outlet Collection at Riverwalk – New Orleans (2014–present); original mall: Riverwalk Marketplace (1986–2013)
- Pecanland Mall – Monroe (1985–present)
- Pierre Bossier Mall – Bossier City (1982–present)
- Prien Lake Mall – Lake Charles (1972–present)
- The Shops at Canal Place – New Orleans (1983–present)
- Southland Mall – Houma (1969–present)
- South Park Mall – Shreveport (1975–2005)

== Maine ==
- Aroostook Centre Mall – Presque Isle (1993–present)
- Auburn Mall – Auburn (1979–present)
- Bangor Mall – Bangor (1978–present)
- Maine Mall – South Portland (1971–present)

== Maryland ==
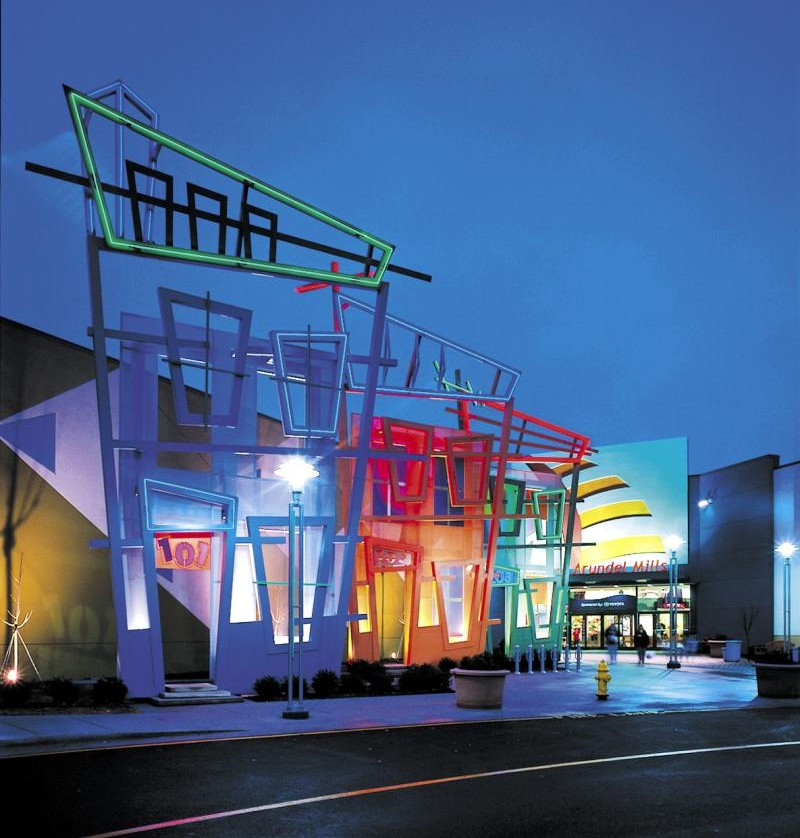
Arundel Mills Rowhouse Entry No. 1 at night

- Annapolis Mall – Annapolis (1980–present)
- Arundel Mills – Hanover (2000–present)
  - Arundel Mills Marketplace (2003–present, outdoor)
- The Brokerage – Downtown Baltimore (1982–1999)
- Beltway Plaza Mall – Greenbelt (1972–present)
- The Centre at Forestville – Forestville (1979–present)
- Clarksburg Premium Outlets – Clarksburg (2016–present, outdoor)
- Circle East – Towson (1998–present, outdoor)
  - Towson Square (2014–2025, outdoor; only Cinemark is still open)
- The Centre at Salisbury – Salisbury (1990–present)
- Centre at Glen Burnie – Glen Burnie (2022–present); original mall: Glen Burnie Mall (1963–2018)
- Country Club Mall – Cumberland (1981–present)
- The Centre at Golden Ring – Rosedale (2002–present); original mall: Golden Ring Mall (1974–2000)
- Eastpoint Mall – Dundalk (1956–2026)
- Ellsworth Place – Silver Spring (1992–present)
- The Fishmarket – Downtown Baltimore (1988–1989)
- Francis Scott Key Mall – Frederick (1978–present)
- Harborplace pavilions – Downtown Baltimore (1980–present)
  - The Gallery at Harborplace (1987–2022)
- Hagerstown Outlets – Hagerstown, Maryland (1998–present, outdoor)
- Harford Mall – Bel Air (1973–2026)
- Hunt Valley Towne Centre – Hunt Valley (2003–present); original mall: Hunt Valley Mall (1981–2000)
- The Mall at Prince Georges – Hyattsville (1977–present)
- The Mall in Columbia – Columbia (1971–present)
- Marley Station – Glen Burnie (1987–present)
- Mondawmin Mall – West Baltimore (1956–present)
- Westfield Montgomery – Bethesda (1968–present)
- Reisterstown Road Plaza – Baltimore (1976–present)
- The Rotunda – Baltimore (1971–present)
- Savage Mill – Savage (1985–present)
- Security Square Mall – Woodlawn (1972–present)
- The Shops at Iverson – Hillcrest Heights (1967–present)
- The Shops at Kenilworth – Towson (1979–present)
- St. Charles Towne Center – St. Charles (1988–present)
- TownMall of Westminster – Westminster (1987–present)
- Towson Town Center – Towson (1959–present)
- Towson Commons – Towson (1992–2011; now features street-level tenants)
- Valley Mall – Hagerstown (1974–present)
- Westfield Wheaton – Wheatland (1981–present)
- White Marsh Mall – White Marsh (1981–present)
- Owings Mills Mall – Owings Mills (1986–2015)
- Mill Station – Owings Mills (2017–present)
- White Flint Mall – Rockville (1977–2015)
- Severna Park Mall – Severna Park (1975–2000)
- Westview Mall – Catonsville (1963–2002)
- Towson Marketplace – Towson, Maryland (1981–1995)
- Salisbury Mall – Salisbury (1968–2004)
- Harundale Plaza – Glen Burnie (1999–present); original mall: Harundale Mall (1958–1997)
- Lakeforest Mall – Gaithersburg (1978–2023)
- Landover Mall – Landover (1972–2002)
- Laurel Mall – Laurel (1979–2012)
- Frederick Towne Mall – Frederick (1972–2013)
- Rockville Metro Center – Rockville (1983–1995); original mall: Rockville Mall (1972–1982)
- Capital Plaza Mall – Landover Hills (1982–2005)

== Massachusetts ==
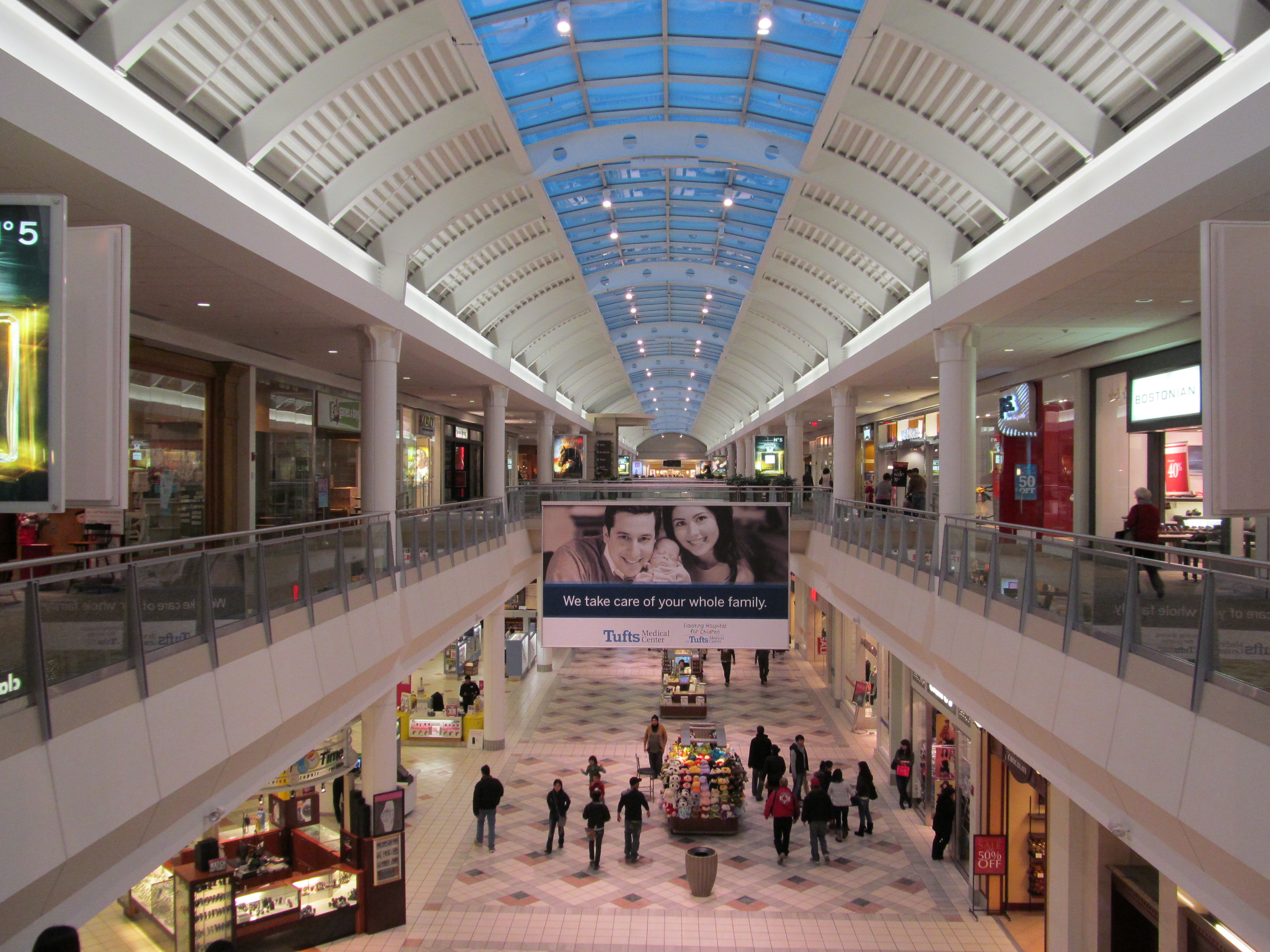
Inside South Shore Plaza, Braintree Massachusetts

- Arsenal Mall – Watertown (1983–2018)
- Auburn Mall – Auburn (1971–present)
- Bayside Mall – Dorchester, Boston (1967–1973)
- Berkshire Mall – Lanesborough (1988–2019)
- Billerica Mall – Billerica (1975–2009)
- Burlington Mall – Burlington (1968–present)
- CambridgeSide – Cambridge (1990–present)
- Cape Cod Factory Outlet Mall – Bourne (1972–2011)
- Cape Cod Mall – Hyannis (1970–present)
- Copley Place – Boston (1983–present)
- Dartmouth Mall – North Dartmouth (1971–present)
- Dedham Mall – Dedham (1967–2005)
- Eastfield Mall – Springfield (1967–2023)
- Emerald Square – North Attleboro (1989–present)
- Greendale Mall – Worcester (1987–2020)
- Faneuil Hall Marketplace – Boston (1976–present)
- Hampshire Mall – Hadley (1978–present)
- Hanover Mall – Hanover (1971–2020)
- Holyoke Mall at Ingleside – Holyoke (1979–present)
- Kingston Collection – Kingston (1989–present)
- LaFayette Place Mall – Boston (1984–1989)
- Liberty Tree Mall – Danvers (1972–present)
- The Mall at Whitney Field – Leominster (1967–present)
- Methuen Mall – Methuen (1973–1997)
- Mountain Farms Mall – Hadley (1973–1998)
- Natick Mall – Natick (1966–present)
- New Harbour Mall – Fall River (1971–2016)
- Northshore Mall – Peabody (1972–present)
- Prudential Center – Boston (1993–present)
- The Shops at Chestnut Hill – Newton (1974–present)
- Silver City Galleria – Taunton (1992–2020)
- Solomon Pond Mall – Marlborough (with the northern part of the mall in Berlin) (1996–present)
- South Shore Plaza – Braintree (1976–present)
- Square One Mall – Saugus (1994–present)
- Swansea Mall – Swansea (1975–2019)
- Westgate Mall – Brockton (1963–present)
- Worcester Center Galleria – Worcester (1971–2006)

== Michigan ==
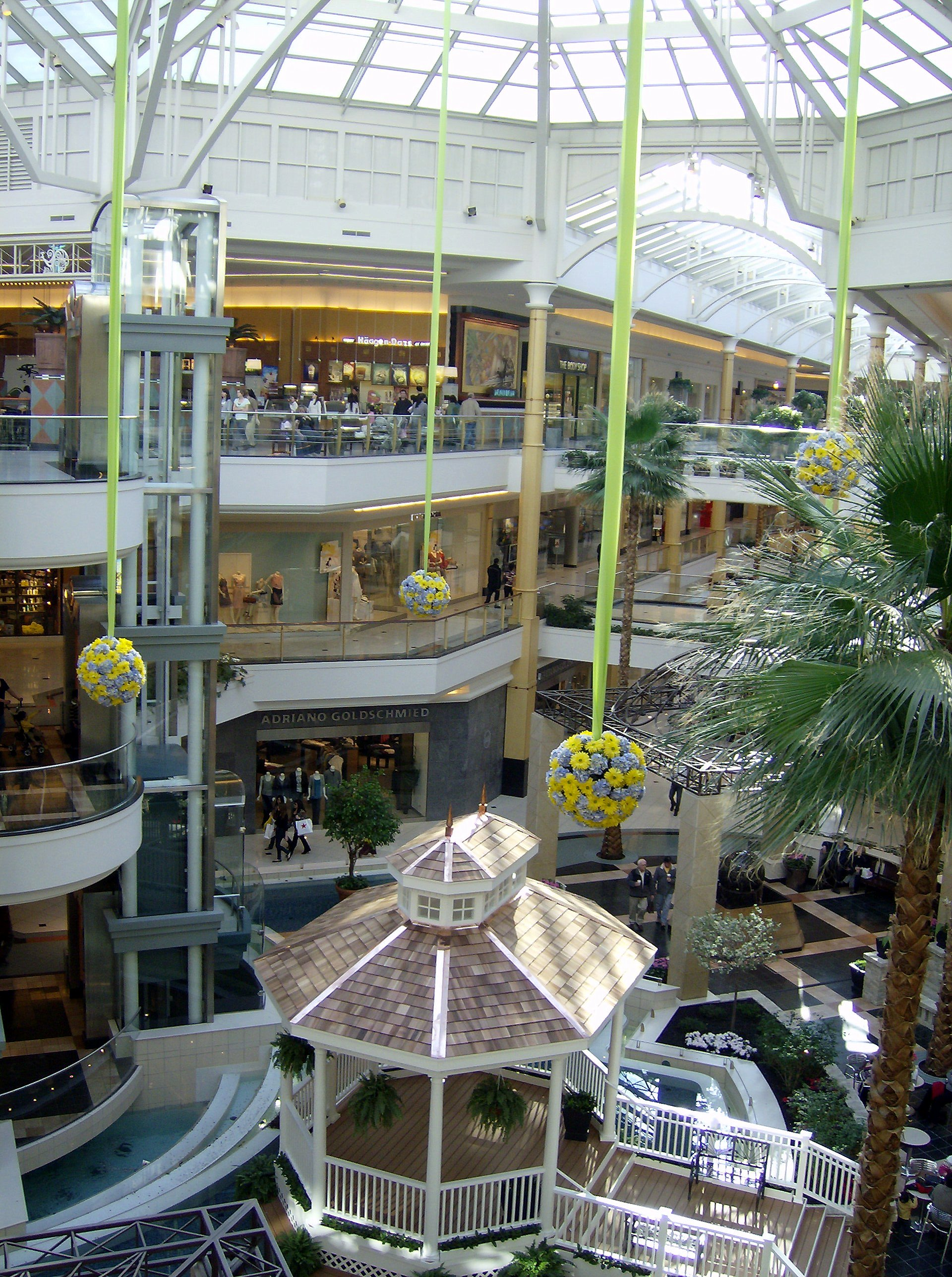
Somerset Collection in Troy, Michigan

- Adrian Mall – Adrian (1970–2020)
- Alpena Mall – Alpena (1980–2022)
- Arborland Center – Ann Arbor (1980–present)
- Bay City Town Center – Bay City (1991–present)
- Birchwood Mall – Port Huron (1991–present)
- Briarwood Mall – Ann Arbor (1973–present)
- Brighton Mall – Brighton (1971–present)
- Shops at CenterPoint – Kentwood (1967–present)
- Cherryland Center – Traverse City (1976–present)
- Courtland Center – Burton (1968–present)
- The Crossroads – Portage (1980–present)
- Dort Mall – Flint (1965–present)
- Eastland Center – Harper Woods (1975–2021)
- Fairlane Town Center – Dearborn (1976–present)
- Fashion Square Mall – Saginaw (1972–present)
- Fort Saginaw Mall – Saginaw (1966–1996)
- Frandor Shopping Center – Lansing (1972–present)
- Genesee Valley Center – Flint (1970–present)
- Grand Traverse Mall – Traverse City (1992–present)
- Great Lakes Crossing Outlets – Auburn Hills (1998–present)
- Hampton Towne Centre – Essexville (1975–2010)
- Jackson Crossing – Jackson (1973–present)
- The Lakes Mall – Muskegon (2001–present)
- Lakeside Mall – Sterling Heights (1976–2024)
- Lakeview Square Mall – Battle Creek (1983–present)
- Lansing Mall – Delta Charter Township (1969–present)
- Laurel Park Place – Livonia (1989–present)
- Livonia Mall – Livonia (1964–2008)
- Macomb Mall – Roseville (1964–present)
- The Mall at Partridge Creek – Clinton Township (2007–present, outdoor)
- The Mall of Monroe – Monroe (1988–present)
- Maple Hill Mall – Kalamazoo (1971–2004)
- McCamly Place – Battle Creek (1986–2019)
- Meadowbrook Village Mall – Rochester (1976–1996)
- Meridian Mall – Okemos (1969–present)
- Midland Mall – Midland (1991–present)
- Muskegon Mall – Muskegon (1976–2001)
- North Kent Mall – Northview (1970–2001)
- Northland Center – Southfield (1975–2015)
- Oakland Mall – Troy (1968–present)
- The Orchards Mall – Benton Harbor (1979–2025)
- Renaissance Center – Detroit (1977–present)
- RiverTown Crossings – Grandville (1999–present)
- Rogers Plaza – Wyoming (1961–present)
- Somerset Collection – Troy (1969–present)
- Southland Center – Taylor (1970–present)
- Summit Place Mall – Waterford Township (1962–2009)
- Tel-Twelve Mall – Southfield (1968–2001)
- Twelve Oaks Mall – Novi (1977–present)
- Universal Mall – Warren (1965–2008)
- Westland Shopping Center – Westland (1965–present)
- Westshore Mall – Holland (1988–2015)
- Westwood Mall – Jackson (1972–present)
- Wonderland Mall – Livonia (1986–2003)
- Woodland Mall – Kentwood (1968–present)
- Water Street Pavilion – Flint (1985–1990)

== Minnesota ==
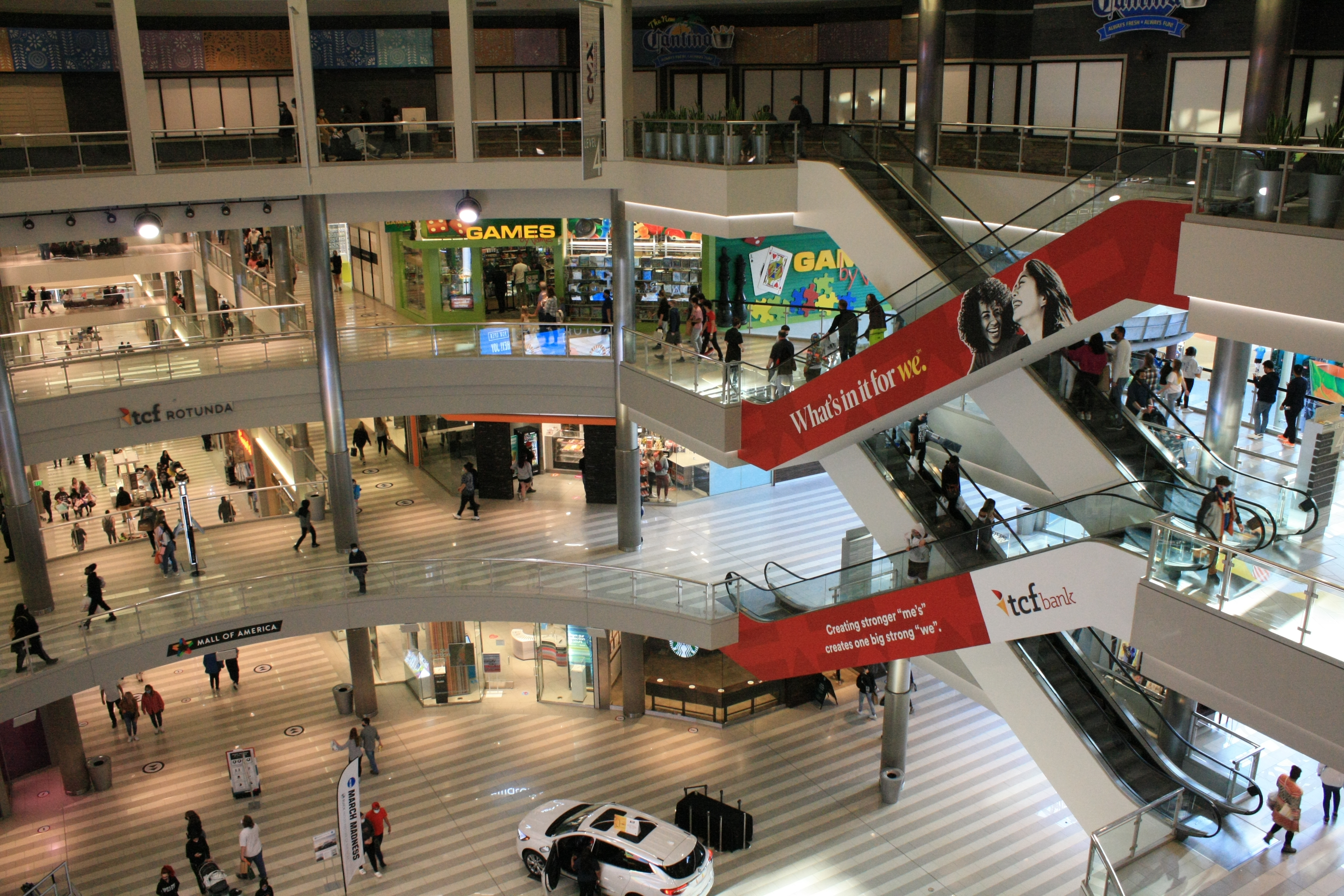
Mall of America, the largest shopping mall in North America

- Apache Mall – Rochester (1969–present)
- Apache Plaza – St. Anthony (1961–2004)
- Bandana Square – Saint Paul (1984–2003)
- Block E – Minneapolis (2001–2014)
- Brookdale Center – Brooklyn Center (1962–2010)
- Burnsville Center – Burnsville (1977–present)
- Cray Plaza – Saint Paul (1986–present)
- Crossroads Center – St. Cloud (1966–present)
- Eden Prairie Center – Eden Prairie (1976–present)
- Four Seasons Mall – Plymouth (1978–2012)
- Galleria Edina – Edina (1976–present)
- Gaviidae Common – Minneapolis (1989–present)
- Har Mar Mall – Roseville (1963–present)
- Knollwood Mall – St. Louis Park (1980–2014)
- Mall of America – Bloomington (1992–present)
- Maplewood Mall – Maplewood (1974–present)
- Midtown Square Mall – St. Cloud (1982–present)
- Miller Hill Mall – Duluth (1973–present)
- Minneapolis City Center – Minneapolis (1983–present)
- Northtown Mall – Blaine (1972–present)
- Paul Bunyan Mall – Bemidji (1977–present)
- Ridgedale Center – Minnetonka (1974–present)
- River Hills Mall – Mankato (1991–present)
- Rosedale Center – Roseville (1969–present)
- Seven Points – Minneapolis (1984–present)
- Southdale Center – Edina (1956–present)
- Uptown Virginia (formerly Thunderbird Mall) – Virginia (1971–2026; indoor only)
- Wayzata Bay Center – Wayzata (1967–2011)

== Mississippi ==
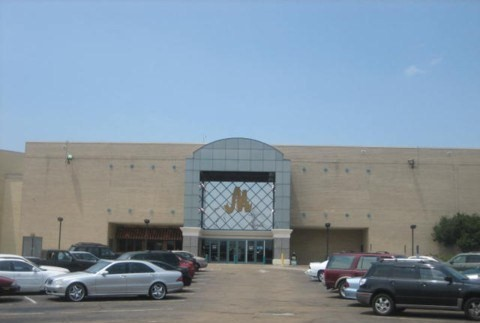
Metrocenter Mall, once the largest mall in Mississippi

- Edgewater Mall – Biloxi (1963–present)
- Village Fair Mall – Meridian (1970–1997)
- Leigh Mall – Columbus (1973–2019)
- Mall at Barnes Crossing – Tupelo (1990–present)
- Metrocenter Mall – Jackson (1978–2018)
- Northpark Mall – Ridgeland (1984–present)
- Turtle Creek Mall – Hattiesburg (1994–present)
- Uptown McComb (formerly Edgewood Mall) – McComb (1987–present)
- Uptown Meridian (formerly Bonita Lakes Mall) – Meridian (1997–present)

== Missouri ==
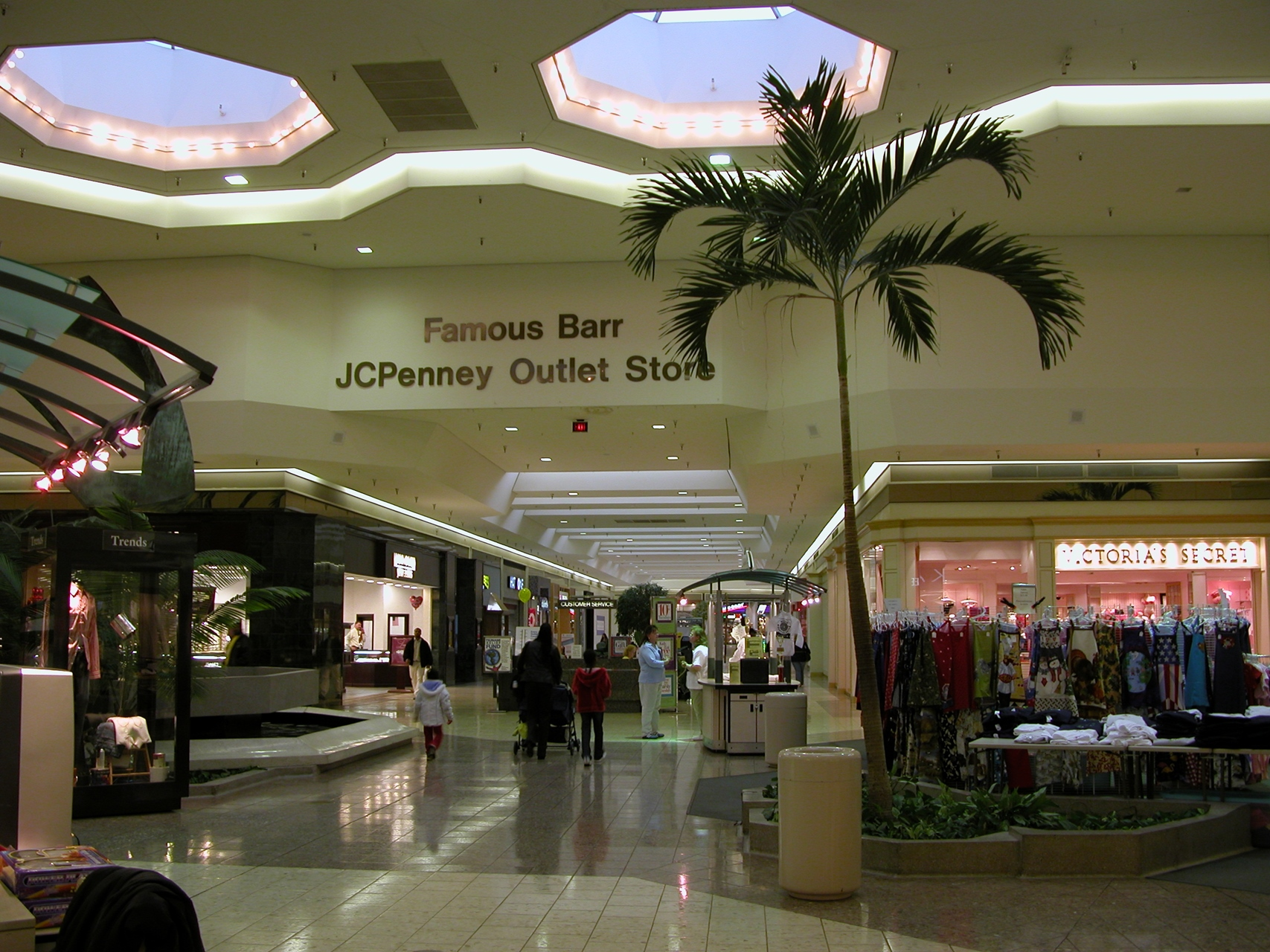
Jamestown Mall in Missouri

- Antioch Center – Kansas City (1978–2012; redeveloped; majority of the mall demolished)
- Bannister Mall – Kansas City (1980–2007; redeveloped as the headquarters campus for Cerner; demolished)
- Battlefield Mall – Springfield (1970–present)
- Blue Ridge Mall – Kansas City (1971–2005; redeveloped; the enclosed mall demolished for redevelopment)
- Capital Mall – Jefferson City (1978–present)
- Chesterfield Mall – Chesterfield (1976–2024)
- Columbia Mall – Columbia (1985–present)
- Crestwood Court – Crestwood (1984–2013)
- Crown Center – Kansas City (1971–present)
- The District of St. Louis – Chesterfield (2019–present, outdoor); original mall: Taubman Prestige Outlets (2013–2019; outlet stores vacated around 2017 to 2019)
- East Hills Mall – St. Joseph (1965–present)
- Independence Center – Independence (1974–present)
- Jamestown Mall – Florissant (1973–2014)
- Metro North Mall – Kansas City (1976–2014; demolished except for Macy's)
- Mid Rivers Mall – St. Peters (1987–present)
- New Landing Mall – Kansas City (1970–present)
- Northpark Mall – Joplin (1972–present)
- Northwest Plaza – St. Ann (1989–2010; redeveloped; mostly demolished)
- Plaza Frontenac – Frontenac (1974–present)
- River Roads Mall – Jennings (1962–1995)
- Saint Louis Galleria – Richmond Heights (1984–present)
- South County Center – St. Louis (1963–present)
- St. Louis Union Station – St. Louis (1985–2016)
- St. Louis Centre – St. Louis (1985–2006)
- St. Louis Mills – Hazelwood (2003–2019)
- St. Louis Premium Outlets – Chesterfield (2013–present, outdoor)
- Ward Parkway Center – Kansas City (1961–present; redeveloped; largely demolished during redevelopment; a small enclosed area remains)
- West County Center – Des Peres (1969–present)
- West Park Mall – Cape Girardeau (1981–present)

== Montana ==
- Capital Hill Mall – Helena (1965–2017)
- Gallatin Valley Mall – Bozeman (1980–present)
- Holiday Village Mall – Great Falls (1962–present)
- Kalispell Center Mall –Kalispell (1986–present)
- Rimrock Mall – Billings (1975–present)
- Southgate Mall – Missoula (1978–present)

== Nebraska ==
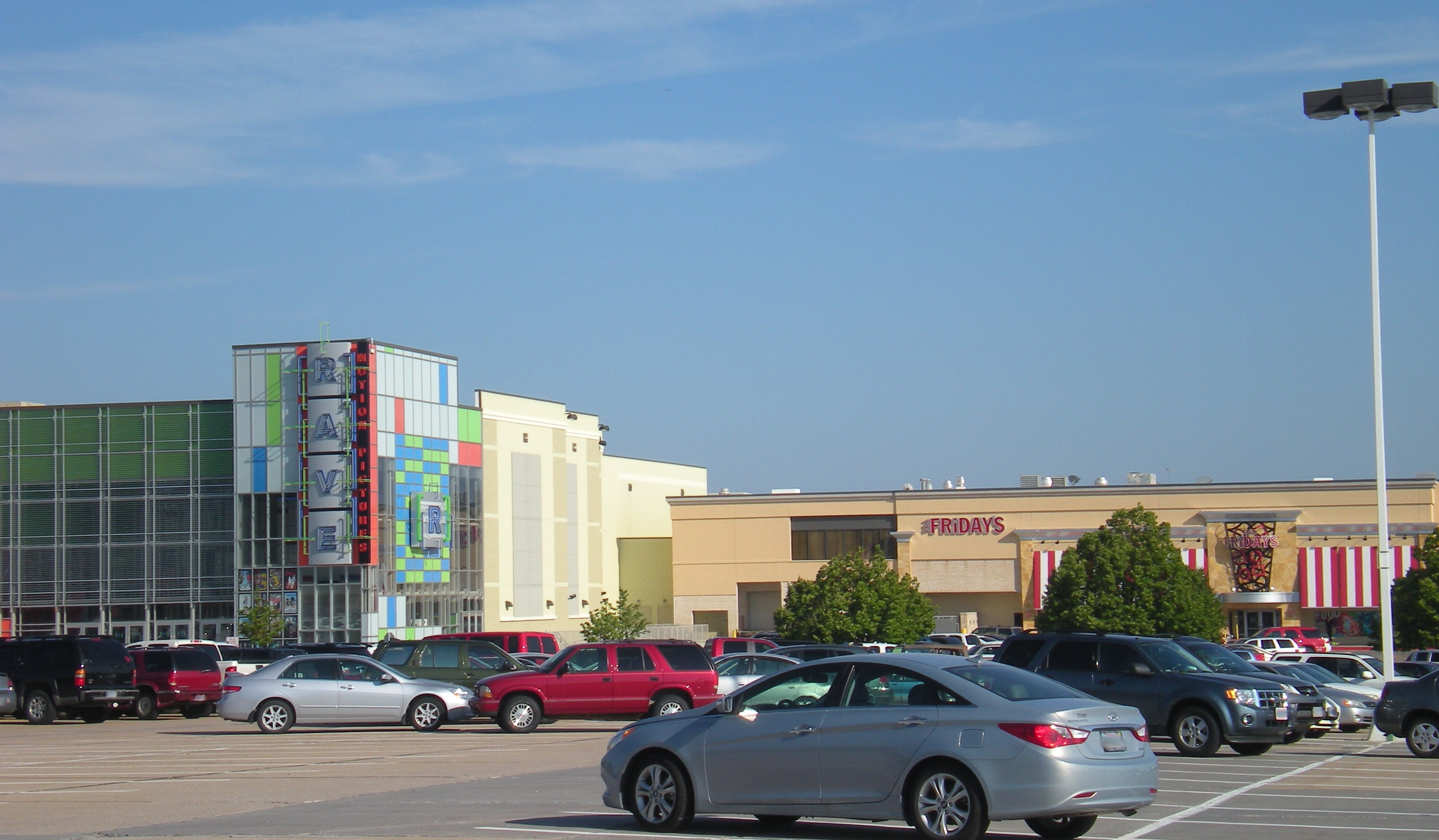
North side of Westroads Mall in Omaha, Nebraska, the largest mall in Nebraska

- Conestoga Mall – Grand Island (1974–present)
- Crossroads Mall – Omaha (1960–2020)
- Gateway Mall – Lincoln (1971–present)
- Oak View Mall – Omaha (1991–present)
- Southroads Mall – Bellevue (1966–present)
- Uptown Scottsbluff (formerly Monument Mall) – Scottsbluff (1986–present)
- Westroads Mall – Omaha (1967–present)

== Nevada ==
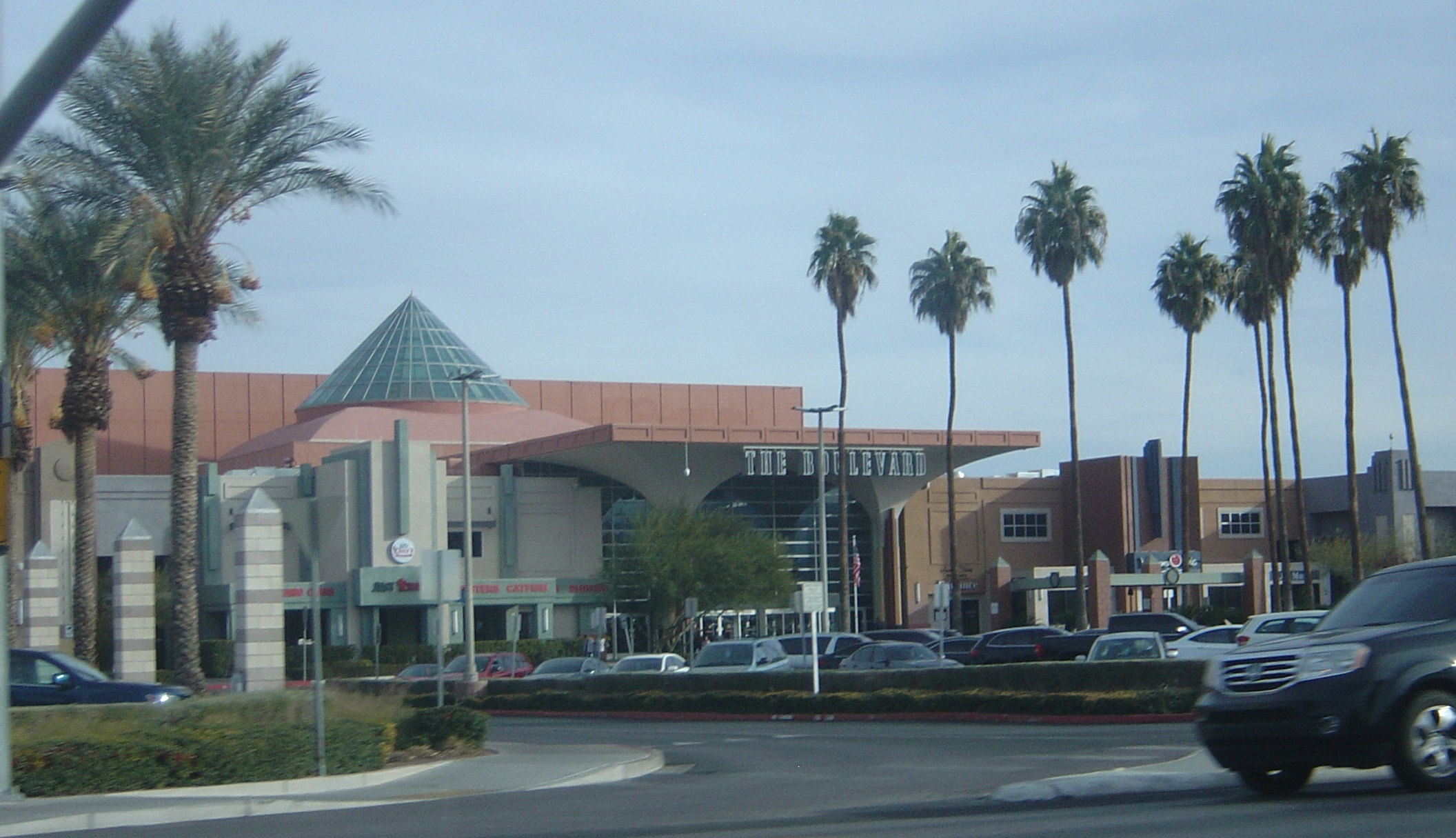
Entrance to the Boulevard Mall in Las Vegas

- 63 CityCenter – Paradise (2023–present)
- The Boulevard Mall – Paradise (1968–present)
- Fashion Show – Paradise (1981–present)
- The Forum Shops at Caesars – Paradise (1992–present)
- Grand Canal Shoppes – Paradise (1999–present)
- Harmon Corner – Paradise (2012–present)
- Meadowood Mall – Reno (1978–present)
- Meadows Mall – Las Vegas (1978–present)
- Miracle Mile Shops – Paradise (2000–present)
- Mershops Galleria at Sunset – Henderson (1996–present)
- Outlets at Legends – Sparks (2008–present, outdoor)
- Park Lane Mall – Reno (1967–2007)
- Prizm Outlets – Primm (1998–2025)
- The Shops at Crystals – Paradise (2009–present)
- Showcase Mall – Paradise (1996–present)
- Tower Shops – Las Vegas (1996–present)

== New Hampshire ==
- Mall at Fox Run – Newington (1983–2026)
- Mall at Rockingham Park – Salem (1991–present)
- Mall of New Hampshire – Manchester (1977–present)
- Merrimack Premium Outlets – Merrimack (2012–present, outdoor)
- Pheasant Lane Mall – Nashua (1986–present)
- Settlers Green – North Conway (1988–present, outdoor)
- Steeplegate Mall – Concord (1990–2022)

== New Jersey ==
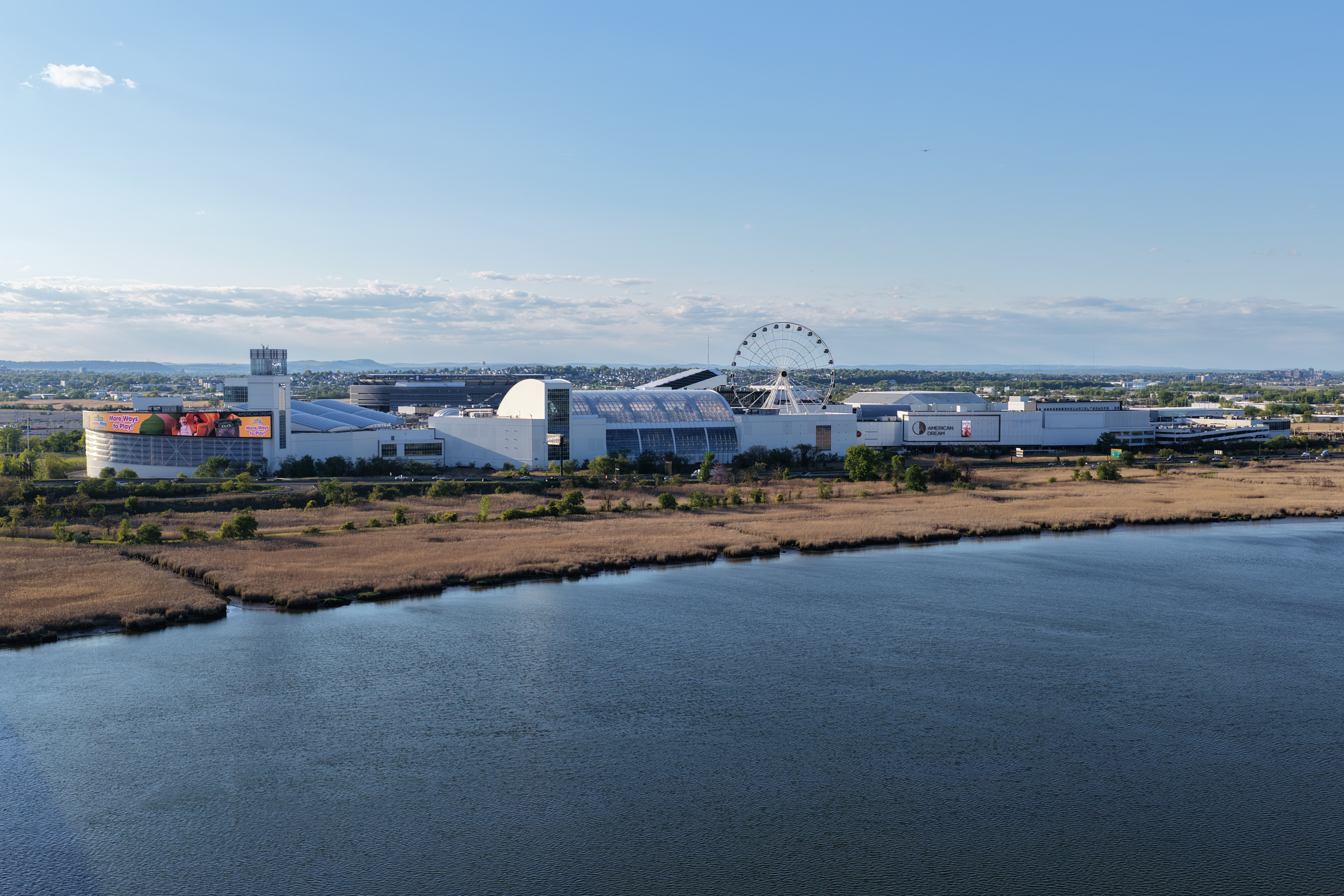
Aerial photograph of American Dream as seen in May 2026. The mall is the second-largest in the United States.

- American Dream – East Rutherford (2019–present)
- Bergen Town Center – Paramus (1973–present)
- Bridgewater Commons – Bridgewater Township (1988–present)
- Brunswick Square – East Brunswick (1970–2026)
- Burlington Center – Burlington Township (1982–2018)
- Center City Mall – Paterson (2008–present)
- Cherry Hill Mall – Cherry Hill (1961–present)
- Cumberland Mall – Vineland (1973–present)
- Deptford Mall – Deptford Township (1975–present)
- Fashion Center – Paramus (1967–2003)
- Freehold Raceway Mall – Freehold Township (1990–present)
- Garden State Plaza – Paramus (1982–present)
- Hamilton Mall – Mays Landing (1987–present)
- Lackawanna Terminal (1981–present)
- Ledgewood Mall – Ledgweood (1972–2016)
- Livingston Mall – Livingston (1972–2026)
- Main Street Complex – Voorhees Township (1988–present, outdoor)
- The Mall at Mill Creek – Secaucus (1986–2007)
- The Mall at Short Hills – Short Hills (1980–present)
- Manalapan Mall – Manalapan Township (1971–1998)
- MarketFair Mall – Princeton (1987–present)
- Menlo Park Mall – Edison (1967–present)
- The Mills at Jersey Gardens – Elizabeth (1999–present)
- Monmouth Mall – Eatontown (1975–2024)
- Moorestown Mall – Moorestown (1963–present)
- Newport Centre – Jersey City (1987–present)
- Ocean County Mall – Toms River (1976–present)
- Paramus Park – Paramus (1974–present)
- Phillipsburg Mall – Phillipsburg (1989–2020)
- Playground Pier – Atlantic City (1983–2023)
- The Plaza at Harmon Meadow – Secaucus (1981–present, outdoor)
- Quaker Bridge Mall – Lawrence Township (1975–present)
- The Quarter at Tropicana – Atlantic City (2004–present)
- Rockaway Townsquare – Rockaway Township (1977–present)
- Seacourt Pavilion – Toms River (1988–present, outdoor)
- Seaview Square Mall – Ocean Township (1977–2000)
- The Shops at Riverside – Hackensack (1977–present)
- Shore Mall – Egg Harbor Township (1974–2012)
- Voorhees Town Center – Voorhees Township (1970–present)
- Wayne Towne Center – Wayne (1989–2008)
- Willowbrook Mall – Wayne (1969–present)
- Woodbridge Center – Woodbridge Township (1971–present)

== New Mexico ==
- Animas Valley Mall – Farmington (1982–present)
- Coronado Center – Albuquerque (1976–present)
- Cottonwood Mall – Albuquerque (1996–present)
- DeVargas Center – Santa Fe (1973–present)
- Fashion Outlets of Santa Fe – Santa Fe (1993–present, outdoor)
- Mesilla Valley Mall – Las Cruces (1981–present)
- North Plains Mall – Clovis (1985–present)
- Santa Fe Place – Santa Fe (1985–present)
- Winrock Center – Albuquerque (1975–2016) as current mixed-use development (2020–present)

== New York ==
- Arnot Mall – Big Flats (1967–present)
- Atlantic Terminal – Brooklyn (2004–present)
- Aviation Mall – Glens Falls North (1975–present)
- Bay Plaza Shopping Center – Co-op City, Bronx (1988–present)
- Boulevard Mall – Amherst (1962–2026)
- Broadway Commons – Hicksville (1968–present)
- Bronx Terminal Market – Concourse, Bronx (2009–present)
- Brookfield Place – Battery Park City, Manhattan (1988–present)
- Camillus Mall – Camillus (1984–2003)
- Champlain Centre – Plattsburgh (1987–present)
- Chautauqua Mall – Lakewood (1971–present)
- City Center at White Plains – White Plains (2003–present)
- Clifton Park Center – Clifton Park (1976–present)
- Cohoes Commons – Cohoes (1987–2000)
- Colonie Center – Roessleville (1966–present)
- Crossgates Mall – Westmere (1984–present)
- Destiny USA – Syracuse (1990–present)
- Dutchess Mall – Fishkill (1974–2001)
- East River Plaza – East Harlem (2009–present, outdoor)
- Eastern Hills Mall – Harris Hill (1971–2024)
- Eastview Mall – Victor (1971–present)
- Fashion Outlets of Niagara Falls – Niagara Falls (1982–present)
- Fulton Market Building – Manhattan (1983–present)
- Fingerlakes Mall – Aurelius (1980–present)
- Galleria at Crystal Run – Wallkill (1992–present)
- Galleria at White Plains – White Plains (1980–2023)
- Great Northern Mall – Clay (1988–2022)
- Green Acres Mall – South Valley Stream (1968–present)
- Hudson Valley Mall – Ulster (1981–present)
- Irondequoit Mall – Irondequoit (1990–2009)
- Jefferson Valley Mall – Yorktown Heights (1983–present)
- Kings Plaza – Mill Basin, Brooklyn (1970–present)
- Latham Circle Mall – Latham (1977–2013)
- Lockport Mall – South Lockport (1971–2006)
- The Mall at Greece Ridge – Greece (1967–present)
- The Mall at the Source – East Garden City (1997–2017)
- Manhattan Mall – Herald Square, Manhattan (1989–2021)
- The Marketplace Mall – Henrietta (1982–2025)
- McKinley Mall – Hamburg (1985–present)
- Midtown Plaza – Rochester (1962–2008)
- Mohawk Mall – Niskayuna (1970–2000)
- Nanuet Mall – Nanuet (1969–2011)
- New Rochelle Mall – New Rochelle (1968–1995)
- New World Mall – Flushing, Queens (2011–present)
- Newburgh Mall – Newburgh (1980–present)
- Northway Mall – Colonie (1970–1998)
- Oakdale Commons – Johnson City (1975–present)
- Palisades Center – West Nyack (1998–present)
- Penn-Can Mall – Cicero (1976–1996)
- South Street Seaport – Manhattan
  - Pier 17 (2018–present); original mall: Pier 17 Pavilion (1985–2013)
- Poughkeepsie Galleria – Poughkeepsie (1987–present)
- Queens Center Mall – Elmhurst, Queens (1973–present)
- Queens Place Mall – Elmhurst, Queens (2002–present)
- Rainbow Centre Factory Outlet – Niagara Falls (1982–2000)
- Rego Center – Rego Park, Queens (2010–present, outdoor)
- Roosevelt Field – East Garden City (Uniondale) (1968–present)
- St. Lawrence Centre – Massena (1990–2024)
- Salmon Run Mall – Watertown (1986–present)
- Sangertown Square – New Hartford (1980–present)
- Saratoga Mall – Wilton (1973–1999)
- Seneca Mall – Buffalo (1969–1994)
- ShoppingTown Mall – DeWitt (1973–2020)
- The Shops & Restaurants at Hudson Yards – Manhattan (2019–present)
- The Shops at Columbus Circle – Deutsche Bank Center, Manhattan (2003–present)
- The Shops at Ithaca Mall – Lansing (1976–present)
- Smith Haven Mall – Lake Grove (with the western half of the mall in St. James) (1969–present)
- The Source at White Plains – White Plains (2004–present)
- South Hills Mall – Poughkeepsie (1974–2008)
- South Shore Mall – Bay Shore (1975–present)
- Southside Mall – Oneonta (1983–present)
- Staten Island Mall – New Springville, Staten Island (1973–present)
- The Summit – Wheatfield (1972–2009)
- Sun Vet Mall – Holbrook (1974–2023)
- Sunrise Mall – East Massapequa (1973–2023)
- Uncle Sam Atrium – Troy (1979–1999)
- Via Port Rotterdam – Rotterdam (1988–present)
- Walden Galleria – Cheektowaga (1989–present)
- Walt Whitman Shops – South Huntington (1962–present)
- The Westchester – White Plains (1995–present)
- Westfield World Trade Center – Financial District, Manhattan (2016–present); original mall: The Mall at the World Trade Center (DESTROYED 1975–2001)
- Wilton Mall – Wilton (1990–present)
- Woodbury Common Premium Outlets – Central Valley (1985–present, outdoor)

== North Carolina ==
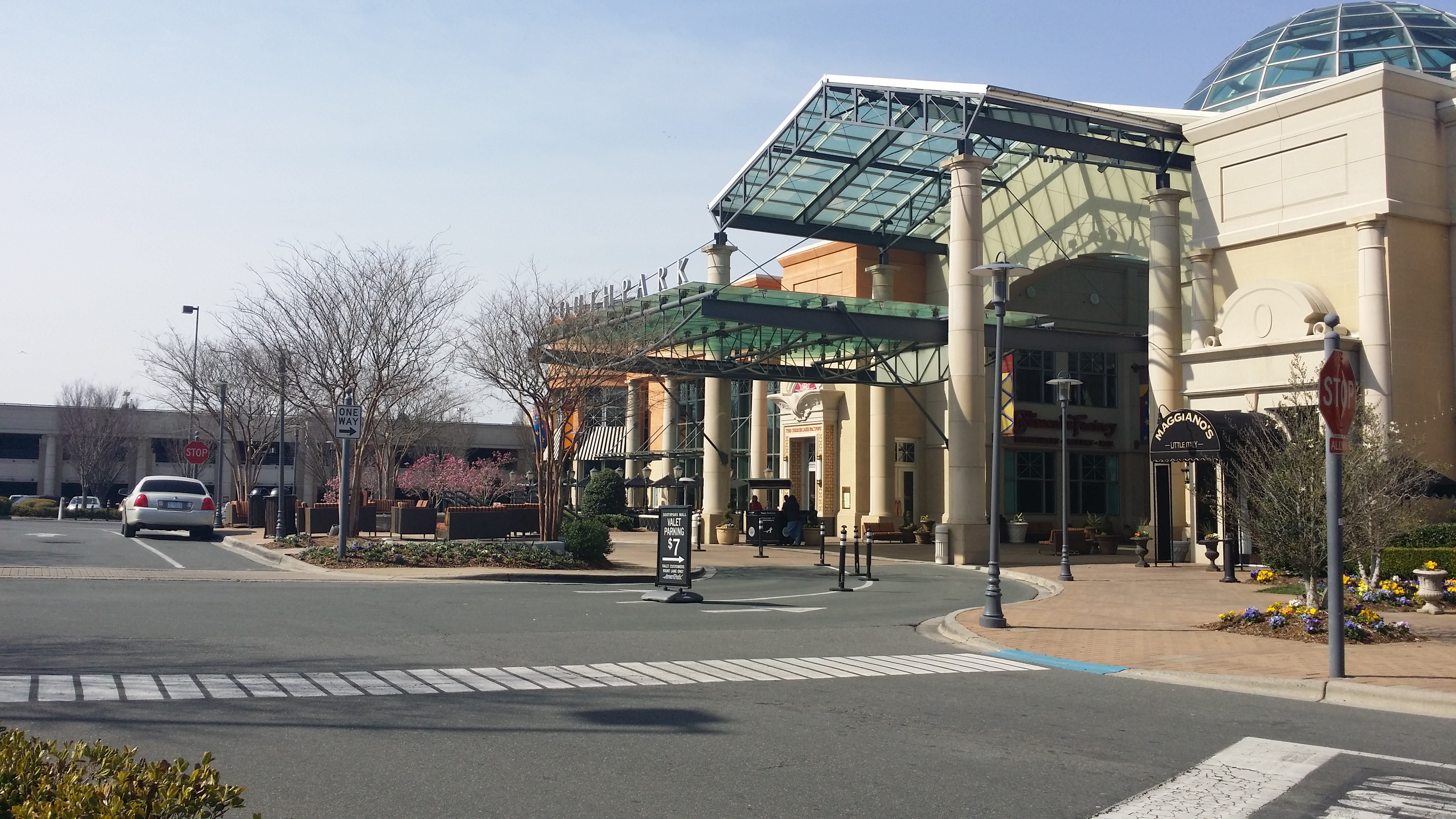
Entrance to the SouthPark Mall, the largest mall in North Carolina

- Asheville Mall – Asheville (1973–present)
- Berkeley Mall – Goldsboro (1975–present)
- Boone Mall – Boone (1981–present)
- Biltmore Square Mall – Asheville (1989–2014)
- Carolina Mall – Concord (1972–present)
- Carolina Circle Mall – Greensboro (1976–2002)
- Carolina Place Mall – Pineville (1991–present)
- Cary Towne Center – Cary (1979–2021)
- Charlottetown Mall – Charlotte (1959–2006)
- Concord Mills – Concord (1999–present)
  - Concord Marketplace (2001–present)
- Crabtree – Raleigh (1972–present)
- Cross Creek Mall – Fayetteville (1975–present)
- Eastland Mall – Charlotte (1975–2010)
- Eastridge Mall – Gastonia (1976–present)
- Four Seasons Town Centre – Greensboro (1974–present)
- Golden East Crossing – Rocky Mount (1986–present)
- Greenville Mall – Greenville (1984–present)
- Hanes Mall – Winston-Salem (1975–present)
- Holly Hill Mall and Business Center – Burlington (1969–present)
- Independence Mall – Wilmington (1979–present)
- Jacksonville Mall – Jacksonville (1981–present)
- Marketplace Mall – Winston-Salem (1984–present)
- Mayberry Mall – Mount Airy (1968–present)
- Monroe Crossing – Monroe (1979–present)
- New Bern Mall – New Bern (1979–present)
- North Hills – Raleigh (1967–present)
- Northgate Mall – Durham (1974–2020)
- Northlake Mall – Charlotte (2005–present)
- Oak Hollow Mall – High Point (1995–2017)
- Quenby Mall – Albemarle (1966–1993)
- Randolph Mall – Asheboro (1982–present)
- Rowan Mall – Salisbury (1967–1995)
- Salisbury Mall – Salisbury (1986–2014)
- Signal Hill Mall – Statesville (1973–2024)
- Southgate Mall – Elizabeth City (1969–present)
- SouthPark Mall – Charlotte (1970–present)
- South Square Mall – Durham (1975–2002)
- The Streets at Southpoint – Durham (2002–present)
- Triangle Town Center – Raleigh (2002–present)
- University Place – Chapel Hill (1973–2025; original indoor mall) (2025–present; Current outdoor shopp)
- Valley Hills Mall – Hickory (1978–present)

== North Dakota ==
Kirkwood Mall

- City Center Mall – Grand Forks (1978–1997)
- Columbia Mall – Grand Forks (1978–present)
- Dakota Square Mall – Minot (1980–present)
- Gateway Fashion Mall – Bismarck (1979–present)
- Grand Cities Mall – Grand Forks (1964–present)
- Kirkwood Mall – Bismarck (1970–present)
- West Acres Shopping Center – Fargo (1972–present)

== Northern Mariana Islands ==
- La Fiesta Mall – Saipan (1993–2004, outdoor)

== Ohio ==
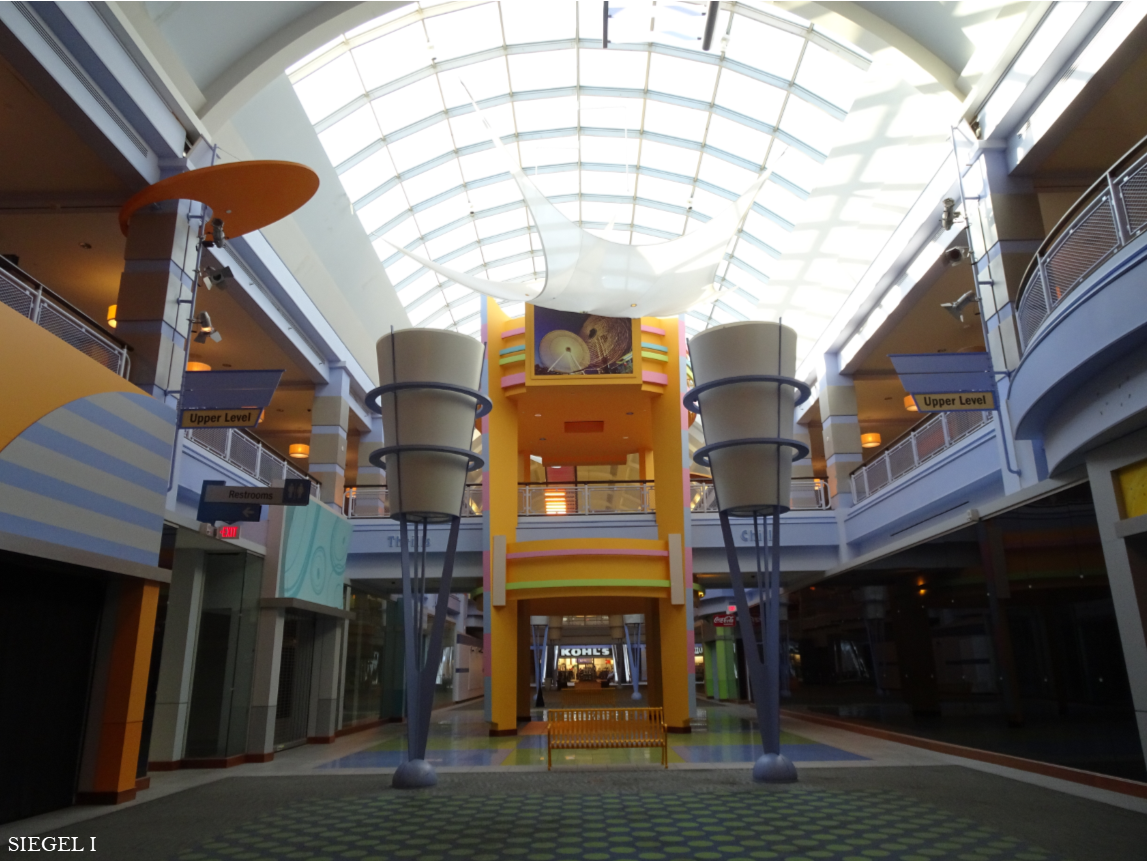
Interior view of Forest Fair Mall (also known as Cincinnati Mills (Note: Various other former names include Cincinnati Mall, The Malls at Forest Fair, and Forest Fair Village)), once the state's most infamous dead malls was demolished in 2026

- Ashtabula Towne Square – Ashtabula (1992–present)
- Beachwood Place – Beachwood (1978–present)
- Belden Village Mall – Jackson Township, Stark County (1970–present)
- Boardman Plaza – Boardman Township (1951–present)
- Chapel Hill Mall – Akron (1967–2021)
- Colony Square Mall – Zanesville (1981–present)
- Columbus City Center – Columbus (1989–2009)
- Dayton Mall – Miami Township, Montgomery County (1970–present)
- Eastgate Mall – Union Township, Clermont County (1980–present)
- Eastland Mall – Columbus (1968–2022)
- Easton Town Center – Columbus (1999–present)
- Eastwood Mall – Niles (1969–present)
- Euclid Square Mall – Euclid (1977–2016)
- Findlay Village Mall – Findlay (1974–2025)
- Forest Fair Mall/Cincinnati Mills – Forest Park and Fairfield (1989–2022)
- Fort Steuben Mall – Steubenville (1974–2026)
- Franklin Park Mall – Toledo (1971–present)
- Galleria at Erieview – Cleveland (1987–present)
- Great Lakes Mall – Mentor (1964–present)
- Great Northern Mall – North Olmsted (1976–present)
- Indian Mound Mall – Heath (1986–present)
- Kenwood Towne Centre – Cincinnati (1987–present)
- Lima Mall – American (1965–present)
- The Mall at Fairfield Commons – Beavercreek (1993–present)
- The Mall at Tuttle Crossing – Columbus (1997–present)
- Miami Valley Centre Mall – Piqua (1988–present)
- Midway Mall – Elyria (1966–2023)
- North Towne Square – Toledo (1981–2005)
- Northgate Mall – Northgate (1972–2026)
- Northland Mall – Columbus (1975–2002)
- Ohio Valley Mall – Richland Township, Belmont County (1978–present)
- Parmatown Mall – Parma (1968–2013)
- Polaris Fashion Place – Columbus (2001–present)
- Portside Festival Marketplace – Toledo (1984–1990)
- Randall Park Mall – North Randall (1976–2009)
- Richland Mall – Ontario (1969–present)
- Richmond Town Square – Richmond Heights (1966–2021)
- River Valley Mall – Lancaster (1987–present)
- Rolling Acres Mall – Akron (1975–2008)
- Salem Mall – Trotwood (1966–2005)
- Sandusky Mall – Perkins (1977–present)
- Severance Town Center – Cleveland Heights (1963–1996)
- Southern Park Mall – Boardman Township (1970–present)
- SouthPark Mall – Strongsville (1996–present)
- Southwyck Mall – Toledo (1972–2008)
- Summit Mall – Fairlawn (1965–present)
- Swifton Commons – Cincinnati (1985–2013)
- Tower City Center – Cleveland (1990–present)
- Tri-County Mall – Springdale (1968–2022)
- Towne Mall Galleria — Middletown (1977–2021)
- Upper Valley Mall – Springfield (1971–2021)
- Westgate Mall – Fairview Park (1969–2005)
- Westland Mall – Columbus (1982–2012)
- Woodville Mall – Northwood (1969–2011)

== Oklahoma ==
- 50 Penn Place – Oklahoma City (1973–present)
- Arrowhead Mall – Muskogee (1987–present)
- Central Plaza – Lawton (1979–present)
- Crossroads Mall – Oklahoma City (1974–2017)
- Eastland Mall – Tulsa (1984–2007)
- Heritage Park Mall – Midwest City (1978–2010)
- Oakwood Mall – Enid (1984–present)
- OKC Outlets – Oklahoma City (2011–present, outdoor)
- Penn Square Mall – Oklahoma City (1982–present)
- Quail Springs Mall – Oklahoma City (1980–present)
- Shawnee Mall – Shawnee (1989–present)
- Shepherd Mall – Oklahoma City (1964–2003)
- The Shoppes at Northpark – Oklahoma City (1972–present)
- Sooner Mall – Norman (1976–present)
- Tulsa Promenade – Tulsa (1986–2023)
- Washington Park Mall – Bartlesville (1984–present)
- Woodland Hills Mall – Tulsa (1976–present)

== Oregon ==
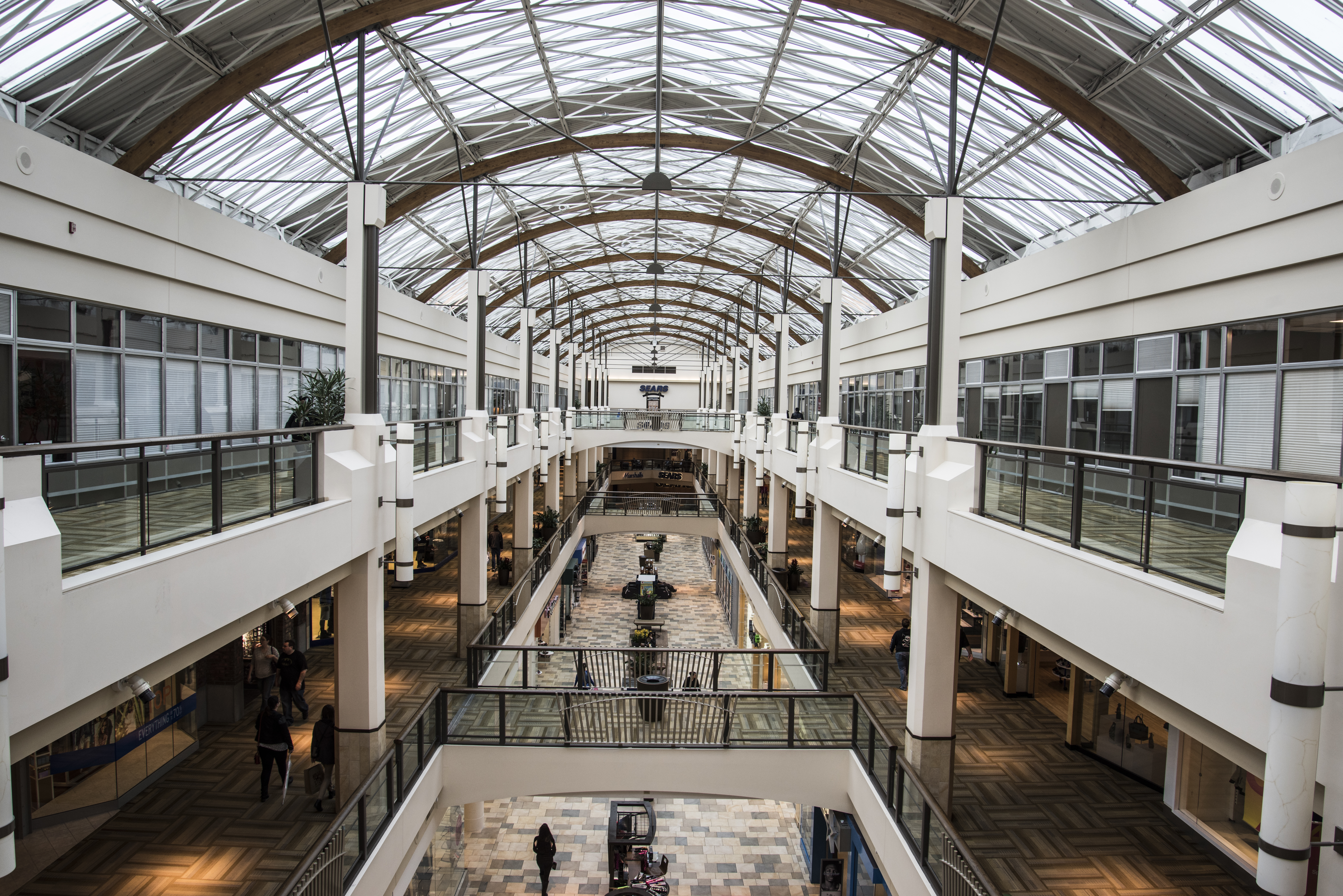
Lloyd Center, the largest mall in Oregon (permanently closed)

- Cedar Hills Crossing – Beaverton (1969–present)
- Clackamas Town Center – Clackamas (1981–present)
- Eastport Plaza – Portland (1979–1996)
- Eugene Mall – Eugene (1971–2001)
- Fubonn Shopping Center – Portland (2006–present)
- Heritage Mall – Albany (1988–present)
- Jantzen Beach Center – Portland (1972–present)
- Lloyd Center – Portland (1960–2026)
- Mall 205 – Portland (1970–2022)
- Oakway Center – Eugene (1966–present)
- Pioneer Place – Portland (1990–present)
- Rogue Valley Mall – Medford (1986–present)
- Salem Center – Salem (1979–present)
- The Shoppes at Gateway – Springfield (1990–present)
- Shute Park Plaza – Hillsboro (1985–present)
- Valley River Center – Eugene (1969–present)
- The Village at Medford Center – Medford (1984–present)
- Washington Square – Tigard (1973–present)
- Willamette Town Center – Salem (1971–present)
- Woodburn Premium Outlets – Woodburn (1999–present, outdoor)

== Pennsylvania ==
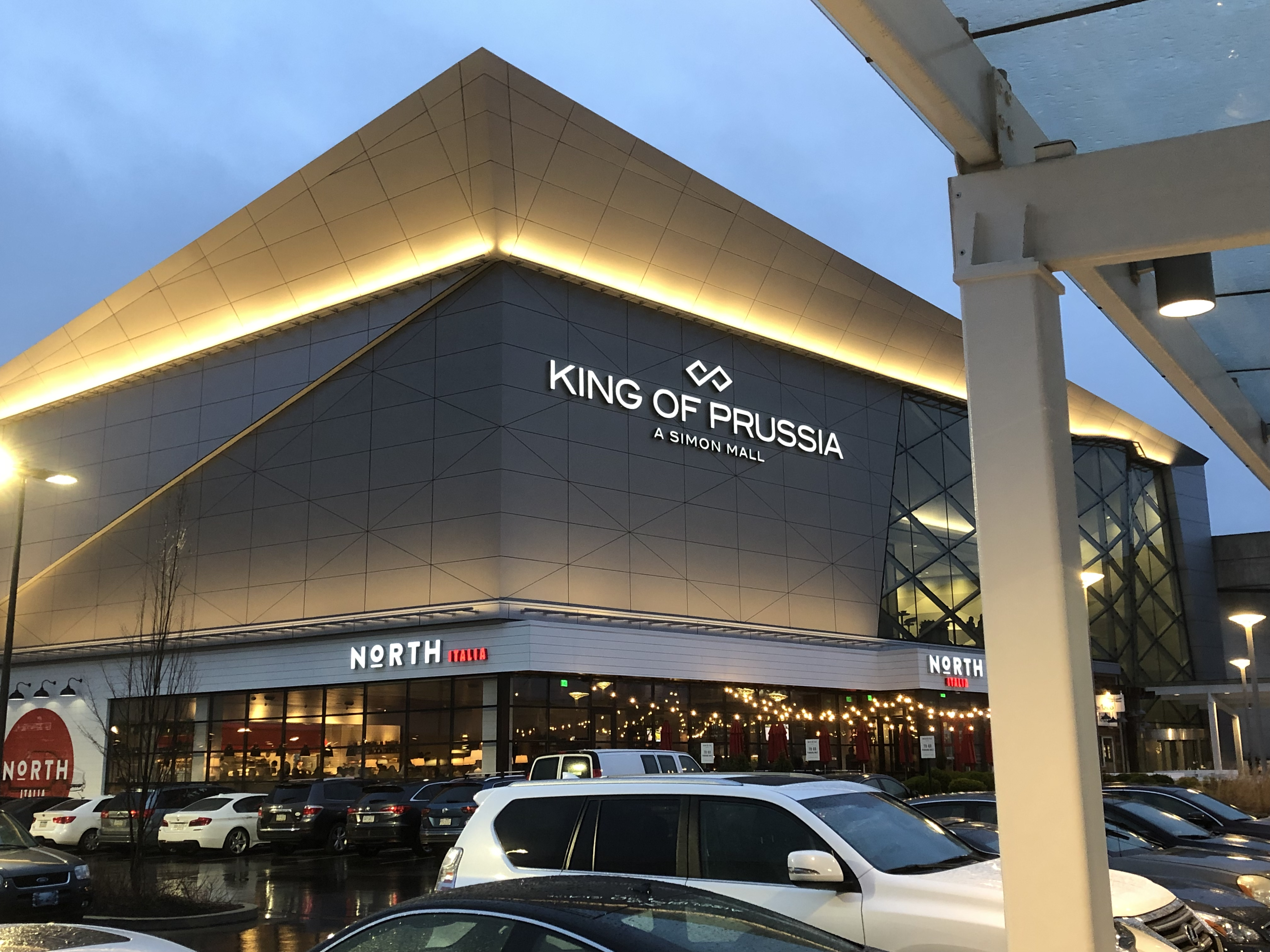
King Of Prussia, the largest mall in Pennsylvania and the 3rd largest in the United States

- Beaver Valley Mall – Monaca (1970–present)
- Berkshire Mall – Wyomissing (1970–present)
- The Block Northway – Pittsburgh (1962–present)
- Capital City Mall – Camp Hill (1974–present)
- Carbon Plaza Mall – Lehighton (1972–present)
- Century III Mall – West Mifflin (1979–2019)
- Chambersburg Mall – Chambersburg (1982–2023)
- Cheltenham Square Mall – Cheltenham Township (1981–2014)
- Colonial Park Mall – Harrisburg (1970–present)
- Columbia Colonnade – Bloomsburg (1988–2022)
- Coventry Mall – Pottstown (1974–2023)
- Cressona Mall – Pottsville (1976–present)
- Eastland Mall – North Versailles Township (1973–2005)
- Exton Square Mall – Exton (1973–2026)
- Franklin Mall – Philadelphia (1989–present)
- Fairgrounds Square Mall – Reading (1980–2018)
- Fairlane Village Mall – Pottsville (1974–present)
- Fashion District Philadelphia – Philadelphia (2019–present); original mall: The Gallery at Market East (1977–2015)
- Granite Run Mall – Middletown Township (1974–2015)
- Greengate Mall – Hempfield Township (1965–2001)
- Grove City Premium Outlets – Grove City (1994–present, outdoor)
- Harrisburg Mall – Harrisburg (1969–2024)
- Highlands Mall – Natrona Heights (1977–2006)
- Indiana Mall – Indiana (1979–present)
- The Johnstown Galleria – Johnstown (1992–present)
- King of Prussia Mall – King of Prussia (1981–present)
- Laurel Mall – Hazleton (1973–present)
- Lebanon Valley Mall – Lebanon (1975–present)
- Lehigh Valley Mall – Fullerton (1976–present)
- Logan Valley Mall – Altoona (1967–present)
- Lycoming Mall – Pennsdale (1978–2023)
- The Mall at Robinson – Robinson Township (2001–present)
- The Marketplace at Steamtown – Scranton (1993–present)
- Millcreek Mall – Millcreek Township, Erie County (1974–present)
- Monroeville Mall – Monroeville (1969–present)
- Montgomery Mall – Montgomeryville (1977–present)
- Neshaminy Mall – Bensalem Township (1968–2026)
- Nittany Mall – State College (1968–present)
- North Hanover Mall – Hanover (1970–2025)
- North Hills Village – Pittsburgh (1976–1996)
- The Outlets at Wind Creek Bethlehem – Bethlehem (2011–present)
- Oxford Valley Mall – Middletown Township (1973–present)
- Palmer Park Mall – Easton (1973–present)
- Park City Center – Lancaster (1971–present)
- Parkway Center Mall – Pittsburgh (1982–2013)
- Philadelphia Premium Outlets – Limerick Township (2007–present, outdoor)
- Pittsburgh Mills – Tarentum (2005–present)
- Plymouth Meeting Mall – Plymouth Meeting (1966–present)
- The Point at Carlisle Plaza – Carlisle (1976–present)
- The Westgate (formerly Westgate Mall) – Bethlehem (1973–present)
- Ross Park Mall – Pittsburgh (1986–present)
- Schuylkill Mall – Frackville (1980–2018)
- Shenango Valley Mall – Hermitage (1968–2024)
- The Shops at Liberty Place – Philadelphia (1990–present)
- South Hills Village – Bethel Park/Upper St. Clair Township (1965–present)
- South Mall – Allentown (1975–present)
- Springfield Mall – Springfield Township (1974–present)
- Strawberry Square – Harrisburg (1978–present)
- Stroud Mall – Stroudsburg (1978–present)
- Susquehanna Valley Mall – Selinsgrove (1978–present)
- Uniontown Mall – Uniontown (1972–present)
- Viewmont Mall – Scranton/Dickson City (1968–present)
- Washington Crown Center – Washington (1969–2026 (indoor))
- Washington Mall – Washington (1968–2014)
- West Manchester Mall – West Manchester Township (1981–2014)
- Westmoreland Mall – Greensburg (1977–present)
- Whitehall Plaza (formerly Whitehall Mall) – Whitehall Township (1966–present)
- Willow Grove Park Mall – Willow Grove (1982–present)
- Wyoming Valley Mall – Wilkes-Barre (1971–present)
- York Galleria – York (1989–present)

== Puerto Rico ==
- Arecibo Mall – Arecibo (1981–1990s)
- Centro del Sur Mall – Ponce (1962–present)
- Centro Gran Caribe – Vega Alta (1987–present)
- El Monte Mall – San Juan (1967–present)
- Las Catalinas Mall – Caguas (1997–present)
- The Mall of San Juan – San Juan (2015–present)
- Mayagüez Mall – Mayagüez (1972–present)
- The Outlet 66 Mall – Canóvanas (2001–present)
- The Outlets at Montehiedra – San Juan (1994–present)
- Plaza Carolina – Carolina (1978–present)
- Plaza Centro Mall – Caguas (1986–present)
- Plaza de Diego Mall – Río Piedras (1983–2014)
- Plaza del Atlántico – Arecibo (1980–2025)
- Plaza del Caribe – Ponce (1992–present)
- Plaza del Carmen Mall – Caguas (1976–present)
- Plaza del Norte – Hatillo (1992–present)
- Plaza del Sol – Bayamón (1998–present)
- Plaza Las Américas – San Juan (1968–present)
- Plaza Rio Hondo – Bayamón (1982–present)
- San Patricio Plaza – Guaynabo (1969–present)
- Santa Rosa Mall – Bayamón (1983–present)
- Señorial Plaza – San Juan (1976–present)

== Rhode Island ==
- Providence Place – Providence (1999–present)
- Rhode Island Mall – Warwick (1967–2011)
- Warwick Mall – Warwick (1970–present)
- Westminster Arcade – Providence (1828–present)

== South Carolina ==
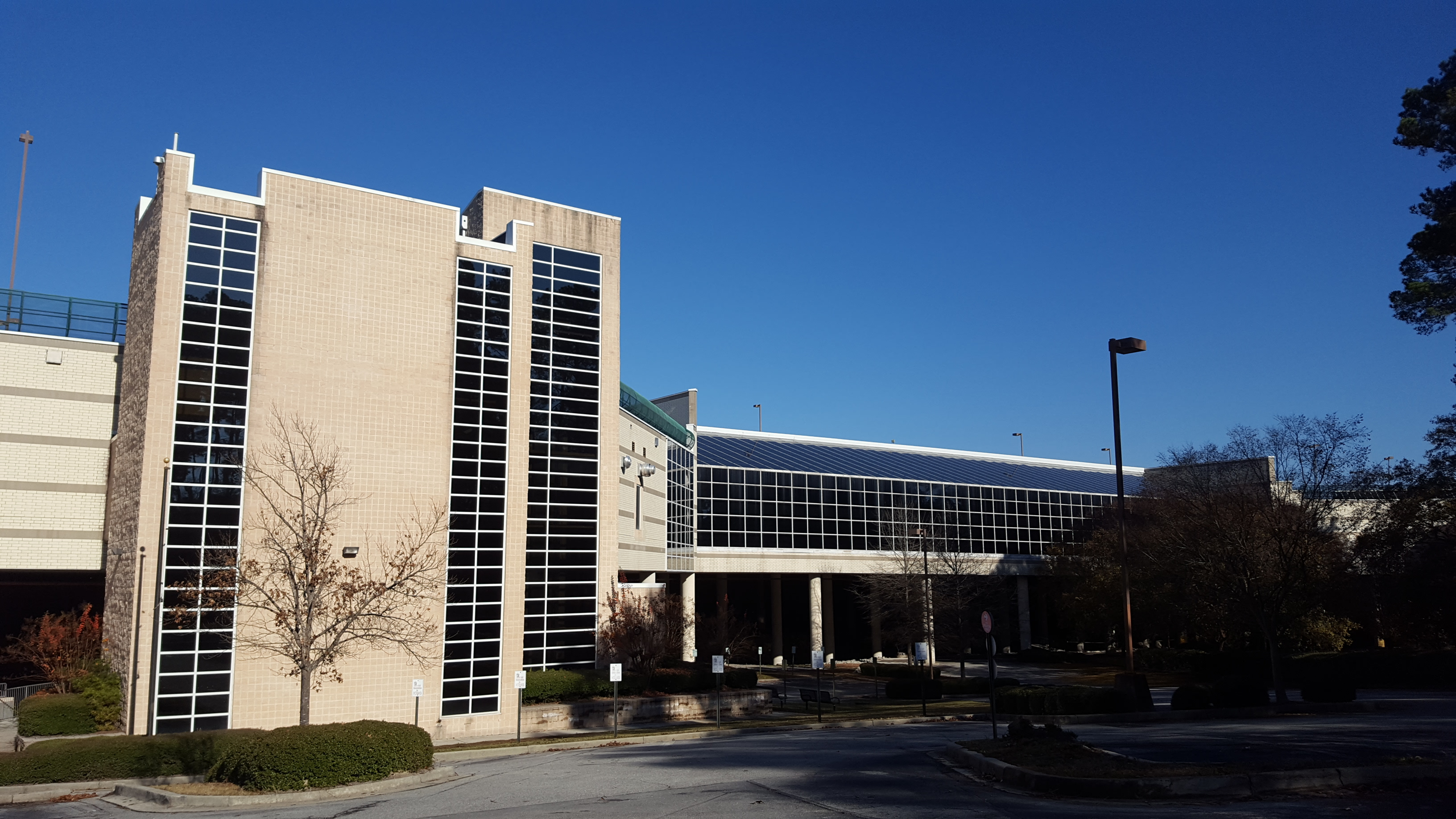
Exterior view of Richland Mall, December 2017

- Anderson Mall – Anderson (1972–present)
- Ashley Plaza Mall – Charleston (1972–1989)
- Charles Towne Square – North Charleston (1976–1997)
- Citadel Mall – Charleston (1981–present)
- Coastal Grand Mall – Myrtle Beach (2004–present)
- Columbia Place – Columbia (1977–present)
- Columbiana Centre – Columbia (1990–present)
- Dutch Square – Columbia (1970–present)
- Greenville Mall – Greenville (1978–2007)
- Haywood Mall – Greenville (1980–present)
- Inlet Square Mall – Murrells Inlet (1990–2024)
- Magnolia Mall – Florence (1979–present)
- The Mall at Shelter Cove – Hilton Head Island (1988–2013)
- McAlister Square – Greenville (1968–present)
- Myrtle Beach Mall – Briarcliffe Acres (1986–present)
- Myrtle Square Mall – Myrtle Beach (1975–2005)
- Northwoods Mall – North Charleston (1972–present)
- Prince of Orange Mall – Orangeburg (1984–present)
- Richland Mall – Columbia (1988–2022)
- Rock Hill Galleria – Rock Hill (1991–present)
- Rock Hill Mall – Rock Hill (1968–1993)
- Sumter Mall – Sumter (1980–present)
- Town Center Mall – Rock Hill (1975–1993)
- Westgate Mall – Spartanburg (1975–present)

== South Dakota ==
- Empire Mall – Sioux Falls (1975–present)
- Uptown Rapid (formerly Rushmore Mall) – Rapid City (1978–present)

== Tennessee ==
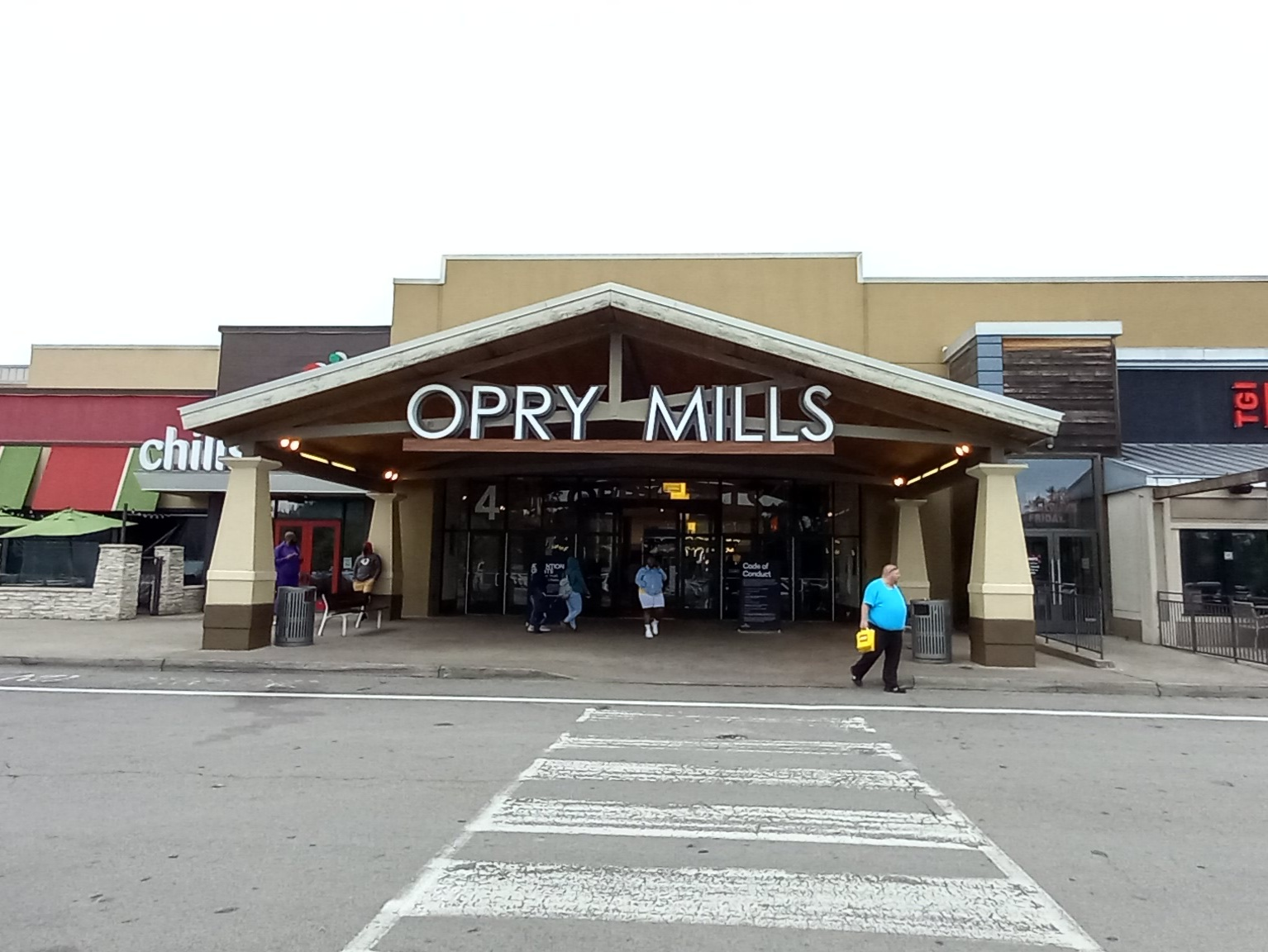
Entrance to Opry Mills

- 100 Oaks Mall – Nashville (1967–present) (redeveloped)
- Bellevue Center – Nashville (1990–2008)
- Bradley Square Mall – Cleveland (1991–present)
- College Square Mall – Morristown (1988–present)
- Columbia Mall – Columbia (1981–present)
- CoolSprings Galleria – Franklin (1991–present)
- Foothills Mall – Maryville (1983–present)
- Fort Henry Mall (formerly Kingsport Town Center) – Kingsport (1976–present)
- Governor's Square Mall – Clarksville (1986–present)
- Hamilton Place – Chattanooga (1987–present)
- Harding Mall – Nashville (1966–2005)
- Hickory Hollow Mall – Antioch (1978–2019)
- Hickory Ridge Mall – Memphis (1981–present)
- Knoxville Center Mall – Knoxville (1984–2020)
- The Mall at Green Hills – Nashville (1984–present)
- The Mall at Johnson City – Johnson City (1971–present)
- Mall of Memphis – Memphis (1981–2003)
- Northgate Mall – Hixson (1972–present)
- Oak Court Mall – Memphis (1988–2026)
- Oak Ridge Mall – Oak Ridge (1991–2016)
- Old Hickory Mall – Jackson (1978–present)
- Opry Mills – Nashville (2000–present)
- Peabody Place – Memphis (2001–2012) (redeveloped)
- Raleigh Springs Mall – Memphis (1971–2016)
- Rivergate Mall – Nashville (1971–2026)
- Southland Mall – Memphis (1966–present)
- Stones River Town Centre – Murfreesboro (1992–present)
- West Town Mall – Knoxville (1972–present)
- Wolfchase Galleria – Memphis (1997–present)

== Texas ==
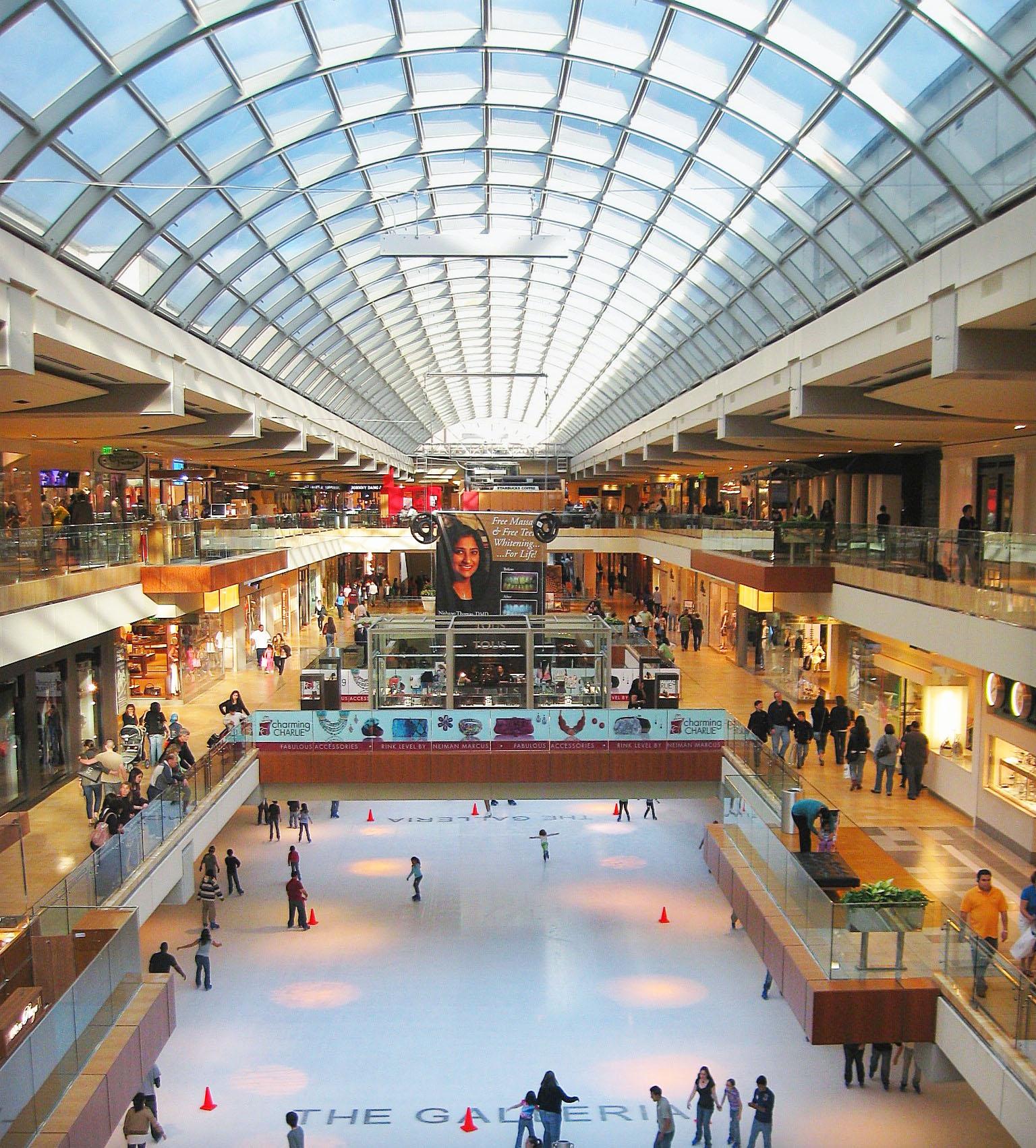
The Galleria Mall, the largest mall in Texas

- Almeda Mall – Genoa, Houston (1968–present)
- Amigoland Mall – Brownsville (1974–1999)
- Barton Creek Square – Austin (1981–present)
- Bassett Place – El Paso (1974–present)
- Baybrook Mall – Clear Lake, Houston (1978–present)
- Big Town Mall – Mesquite (1959–2001)
- Brazos Mall – Lake Jackson (1976–present)
- Broadway Square Mall – Tyler (1975–present)
- Central Mall – Port Arthur (1982–present)
- Central Mall – Texarkana (1978–present)
- Cielo Vista Mall – El Paso (1974–present)
- Collin Creek Mall – Plano (1981–2019)
- Deerbrook Mall – Humble (1984–present)
- First Colony Mall – Sugar Land (1996–present)
- Forum 303 Mall – Arlington (1970–2006)
- The Galleria – Uptown, Houston (1970–present)
- Galleria Dallas – Dallas (1982–present)
- Golden Triangle Mall – Denton (1980–present)
- Grapevine Mills – Grapevine (1997–present)
- Greenspoint Mall – Greenspoint, Houston (1976–2024)
- Gulfgate Mall – East End, Houston (1967–2000)
- Highland Mall – Austin (1971–2015)
- Hulen Mall – Fort Worth (1977–present)
- Ingram Park Mall – San Antonio (1979–present)
- Irving Mall – Irving (1971–present)
- Katy Mills – Katy (1999–present)
- Killeen Mall – Killeen (1981–present)
- La Gran Plaza de Fort Worth – Fort Worth (1987–present)
- La Palmera – Corpus Christi (1970–present)
- La Plaza Mall – McAllen (1976–present)
- Lakeline Mall – Austin (1995–present)
- Longview Mall – Longview (1978–present)
- Macroplaza Mall – Pasadena (1982–present)
- Mainland City Centre – Texas City (1991–present)
- Mall del Norte – Laredo (1977–present)
- Mall of Abilene – Abilene (1979–present)
- Memorial City Mall – Memorial City, Houston (1966–present)
- Midland Park Mall – Midland (1980–present)
- Midway Mall – Sherman (1986–present)
- Music City Mall – Lewisville (1989–present)
- Music City Mall – Odessa (1980–present)
- North East Mall – Hurst (1971–present)
- North Hills Mall – North Richland Hills (1979–2004)
- North Star Mall – San Antonio (1960–present)
- Northline Mall – Houston (1963–2005)
- NorthPark Center – Dallas (1965–present)
- Northwest Mall – Lazybrook/Timbergrove, Houston (1968–2017)
- Parkdale Mall – Beaumont (1973–present)
- The Parks Mall at Arlington – Arlington (1988–present)
- PlazAmericas – Sharpstown, Houston (1961–present)
- Post Oak Mall – College Station (1982–present)
- Prestonwood Town Center – Dallas (1979–2000)
- Richardson Square Mall – Richardson (1977–2006)
- Richland Mall – Waco (1980–present)
- Ridgmar Mall – Fort Worth (1976–present)
- Rio Grande Valley Premium Outlets – Mercedes (2006–present, outdoor)
- Rolling Oaks Mall – San Antonio (1988–present)
- Saks Fifth Avenue Center of Fashion (Pavilion at Post Oak) – Uptown Houston (1988–2007)
- San Jacinto Mall – Baytown (1981–2020)
- The Shoppes at Solana – El Paso (1988–present)
- The Shops at Houston Center – Downtown Houston (1982–present)
- The Shops at La Cantera – San Antonio (2005–present, outdoor)
- Shops at Rivercenter – Downtown San Antonio (1988–present)
- The Shops at RedBird – Dallas (1975–present)
- The Shops at Willow Bend – Plano (2001–2026)
- Sikes Senter – Wichita Falls (1974–present)
- Six Flags Mall – Arlington (1970–2016)
- South Park Mall – San Antonio (1974–present)
- South Plains Mall – Lubbock (1972–present)
- Stonebriar Centre – Frisco (2000–present)
- Sunrise Mall – Brownsville (1979–present)
- Sunrise Mall – Corpus Christi (1981–2019)
- Sunset Mall – San Angelo (1979–present)
- Temple Mall – Temple (1976–present)
- Town & Country Mall – Alief, Houston (1983–2004)
- Town East Mall – Mesquite (1971–present)
- Valle Vista Mall – Harlingen (1983–present)
- Valley View Center – Dallas (1973–2017)
- Victoria Mall – Victoria (1981–present)
- West Oaks Mall – Alief, Houston (1984–2024)
- Western Plaza – Amarillo (1968–2006)
- Westgate Mall – Amarillo (1982–present)
- Willowbrook Mall – Cypress (1981–present)
- Windsor Park Mall – San Antonio (1976–2005)
- Wonderland of the Americas – Balcones Heights (1961–present)
- The Woodlands Mall – The Woodlands (1994–present)

== United States Virgin Islands ==
- Tutu Park Mall – St. Thomas (1993–present)

== Utah ==
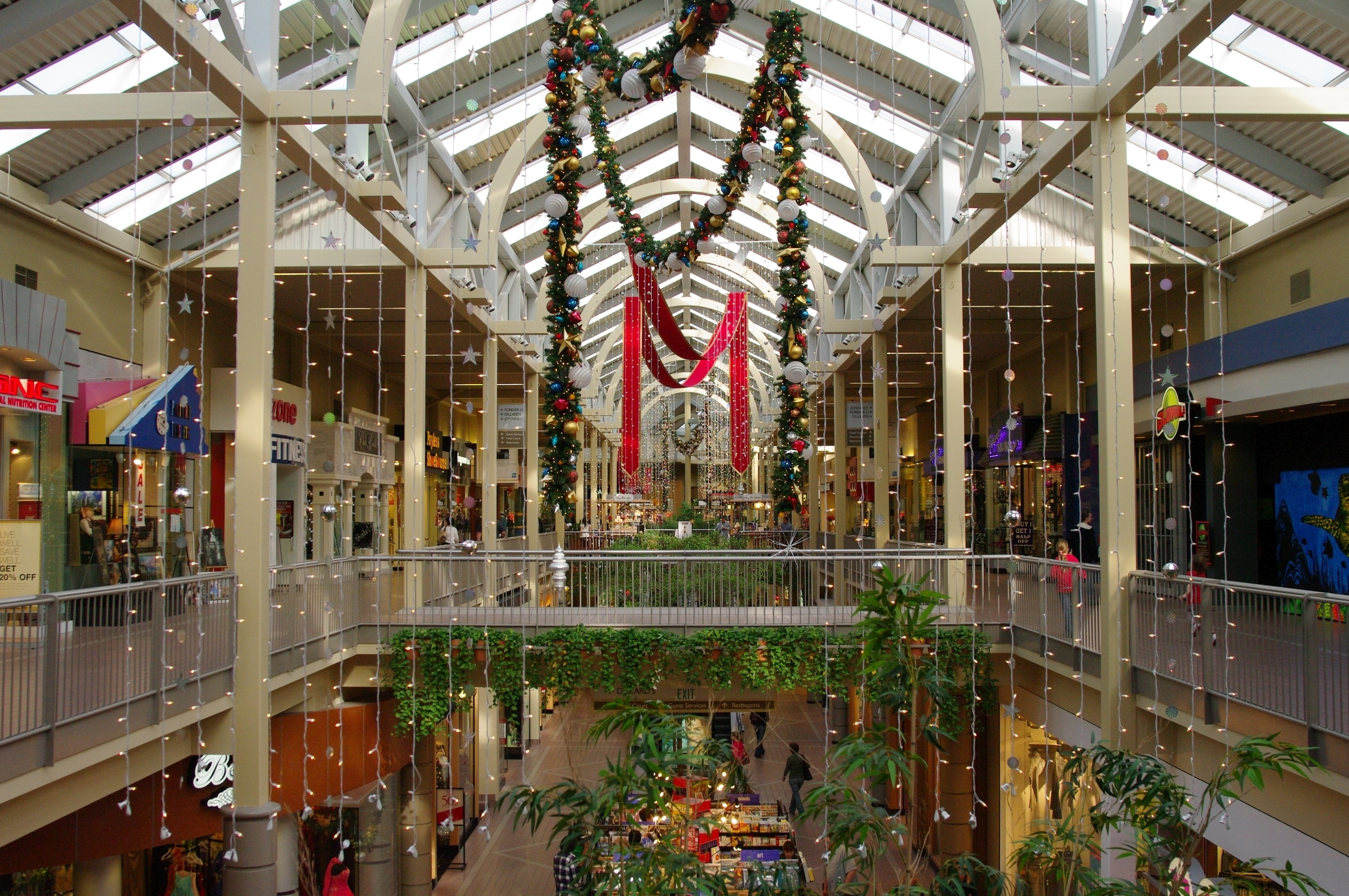
Interior of Shops at South Town before remodel

- Cache Valley Mall – Logan (1976–2024)
- City Creek Center – Salt Lake City (2012–present, outdoor)
- Cottonwood Mall – Holladay (1962–2007)
- Crossroads Plaza – Salt Lake City (1980–2007, replaced by City Creek Center)
- Fashion Place – Murray (1972–present)
- Layton Hills Mall – Layton (1980–present)
- Newgate Mall – Ogden (1981–present)
- Provo Towne Centre – Provo (1998–present)
- Red Cliffs Mall – St. George (1990–present)
- Shops at South Town – Sandy (1986–present)
- Trolley Square – Salt Lake City (1972–present)
- University Place – Orem (1973–present)
- Valley Fair Mall – West Valley City (1970–present)
- Ogden City Mall – Ogden City (1980–2002, replaced by The Junction)
- ZCMI Center Mall – Salt Lake City (1975–2007, replaced by City Creek Center)

== Vermont ==
- CityPlace Burlington – Burlington (1976–2022)
- Diamond Run Mall – Rutland (1995–2019)
- University Mall – South Burlington (1979–present)

== Virginia ==
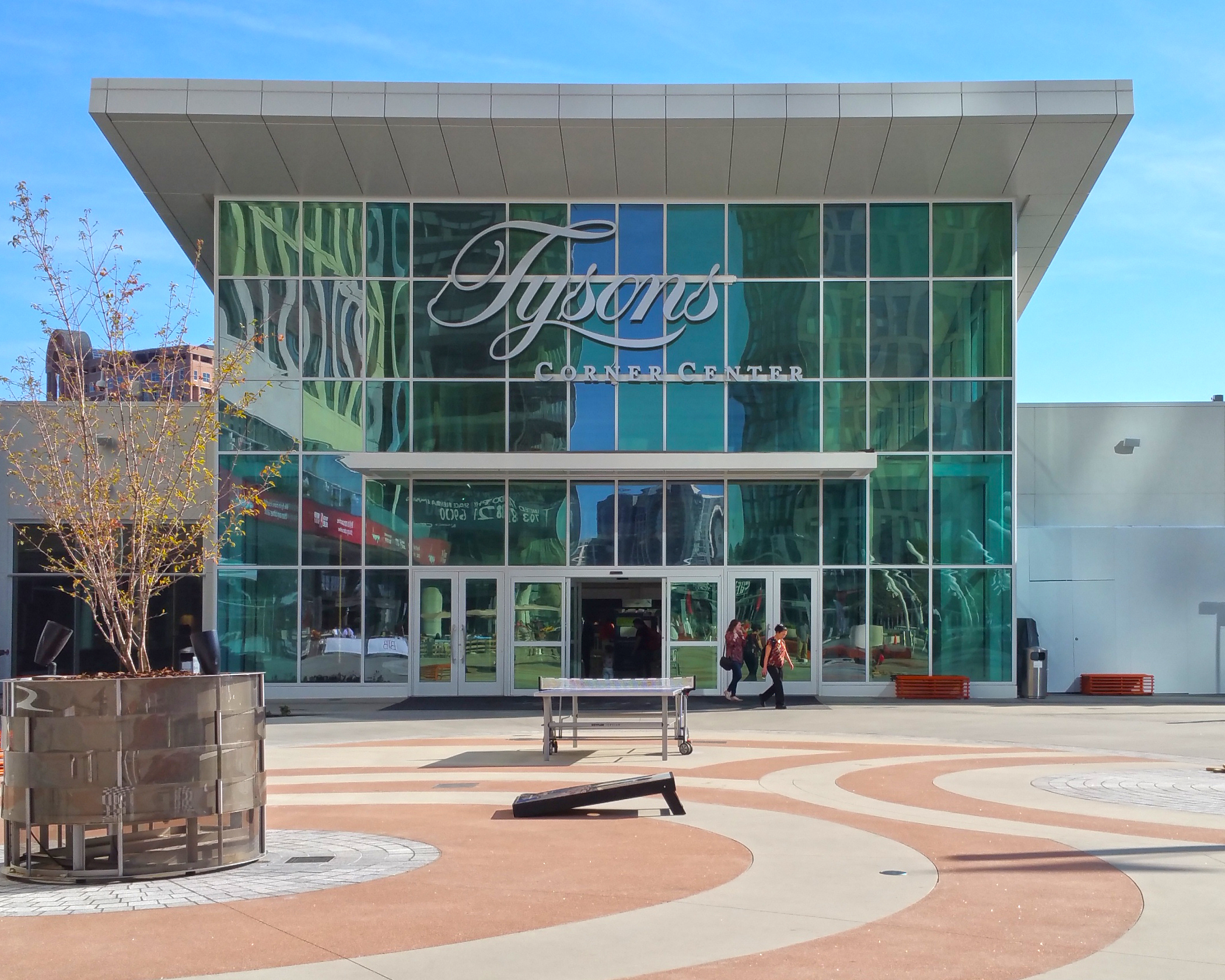
The entrance to Tysons Corner Center, the 8th largest mall in the United States, and the largest in Virginia

- Apple Blossom Mall – Winchester (1982–present)
- Azalea mall – Richmond (1962–1995) (Note: Opening and closure dates may vary by source. The following citation, which is an official news outlet (12onyourside) cites 1962 and 1995. Other sources might cite 1963 and 1996.)
- Ballston Quarter – Arlington (1986–present)
- Bristol Mall – Bristol (1976–2017)
- Charlottesville Fashion Square – Charlottesville (1980–2025)
- Chesapeake Square – Chesapeake (1989–present)
- Chesterfield Towne Center – Richmond (1975–present)
- Claypool Hill Mall – Cedar Bluff (1982–present)
- Cloverleaf Mall – Chesterfield (1972–2008)
- Coliseum Mall – Hampton (1973–2007)
- Danville Mall – Danville (1984–present)
- Dulles Town Center – Dulles (1999–present)
- Eden Center – Falls Church (1984–present)
- Fair Oaks Mall – Fairfax (1980–present)
- Fashion Centre at Pentagon City – Arlington (1989–present)
- Greenbrier Mall – Chesapeake (1981–present)
- Landmark Mall – Alexandria (1990–2017)
- Lynnhaven Mall – Virginia Beach (1981–present)
- MacArthur Center – Norfolk (1999–2026)
- Manassas Mall – Manassas (1972–present)
- Military Circle Mall – Norfolk (1970–2023)
- Mercury Plaza Mall – Hampton (1967–1987)
- Newmarket North Mall – Hampton (1975–2000)
- Norfolk Premium Outlets – Norfolk (2017–present, outdoor)
- Patrick Henry Mall – Newport News (1987–present)
- Pembroke Mall – Virginia Beach (1966–2022)
- Potomac Mills – Woodbridge (1985–present)
  - Stonebridge at Potomac Town Center (2012–present, outdoor)
- Regency Mall – Richmond (1975–present)
- Richlands Mall – Richlands (1980–present)
- River Ridge Mall – Lynchburg (1980–present)
- Seven Corners Shopping Center – Seven Corners (1969–1995)
- The Shops at Willow Lawn – Richmond (2012–present)
- 6th Street Marketplace – Richmond (1985–2003)
- Short Pump Town Center – Richmond (2003–present, outdoor)
- Skyline Mall – Bailey's Crossroads (1977–2002)
- Southpark Mall – Colonial Heights (1989–present)
- Spotsylvania Towne Centre – Spotsylvania County (1980–present)
- Springfield Town Center – Springfield (1973–present)
- Staunton Mall – Staunton (1987–2020)
- Stony Point Fashion Park – Richmond (2003–present, outdoor)
- Tanglewood Mall – Roanoke (1973–present)
- Tower Mall – Portsmouth (1973–2000)
- Tysons Corner Center – McLean (1968–present)
- Tysons Galleria – McLean (1988–present)
- Uptown Christiansburg (formerly New River Valley Mall) – Christiansburg (1988–present)
- Valley Mall – Harrisonburg (1978–present)
- Valley View Mall – Roanoke (1985–present)
- Virginia Center Commons – Glen Allen (1991–2022)
- Williamsburg Outlet Mall – Williamsburg (1983–2013)
- Willow Lawn Shopping Center (1956–2011) (reveloped into The Shops at Willow Lawn in 2012)
- Waterside Festival Marketplace – Norfolk (1983–2014)

== Washington (state) ==
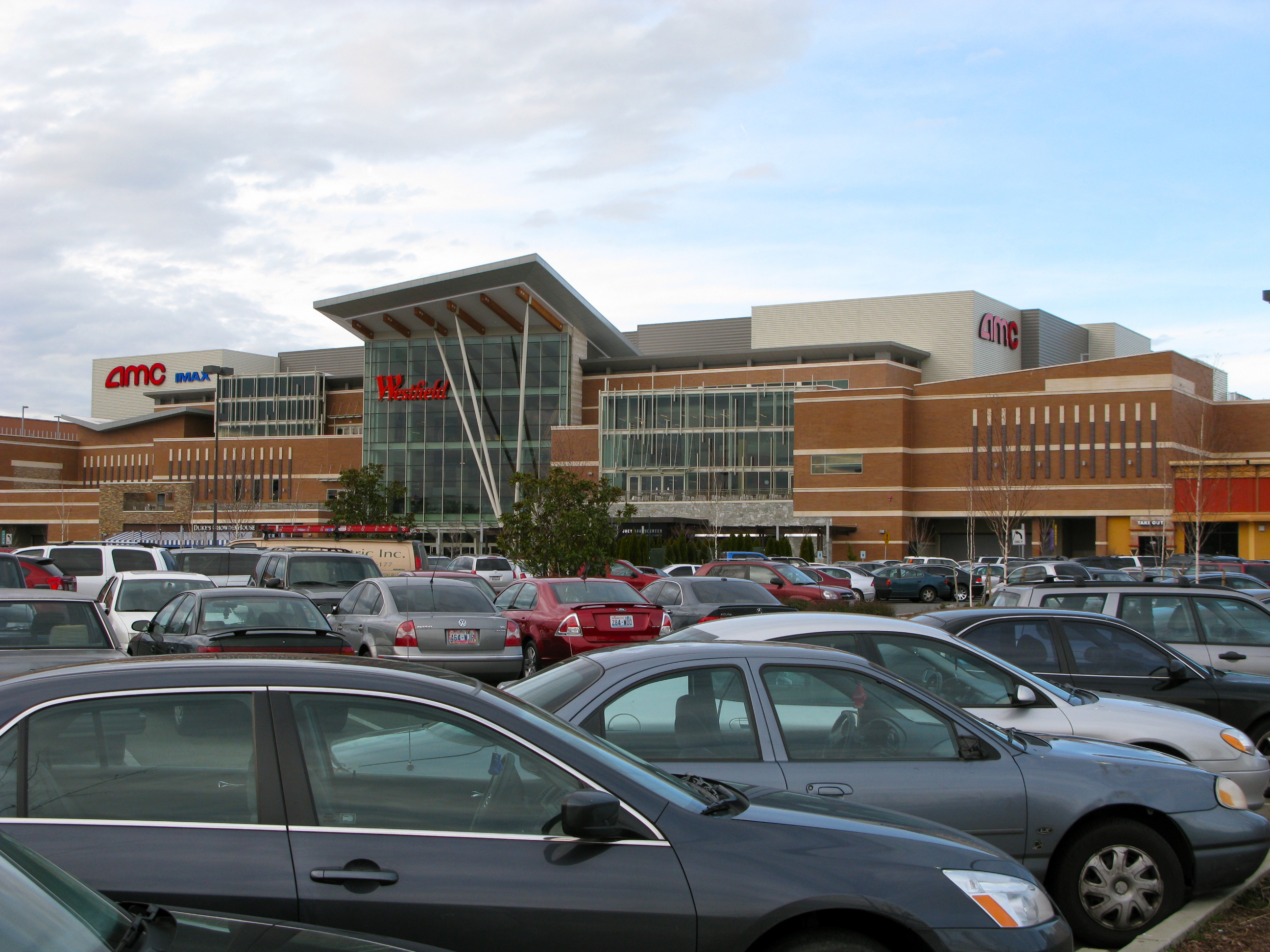
Westfield Southcenter mall, the largest mall in Washington.

- Alderwood Mall – Lynnwood (1979–present)
- Bellevue Square – Bellevue (1985–present)
- Bellis Fair Mall – Bellingham (1988–present)
- Blue Mountain Mall – Walla Walla (1989–2017)
- Capital Mall – Olympia (1977–present)
- Cascade Mall – Burlington (1989–2020)
- Columbia Center Mall – Kennewick (1969–present)
- The Commons at Federal Way – Federal Way (1975–present)
- Everett Mall – Everett (1974–2025)
- Kitsap Mall – Silverdale (1985–present)
- Lakewood Mall – Lakewood (1989–2001)
- Marketplace @ Factoria – Bellevue (1977–present)
- Northgate Mall – Seattle (1950–present)
- NorthTown Mall – Spokane (1983–present)
- The Outlet Collection Seattle – Auburn (1995–present)
- Pacific Place – Seattle (1998–present)
- River Park Square – Spokane (1974–present)
- South Hill Mall – Puyallup (1988–present)
- South Sound Center – Lacey (1966–2001)
- Spokane Valley Mall – Spokane Valley (1997–present)
- Tacoma Mall – Tacoma (1965–present)
- Totem Lake Mall – Kirkland (1973–2016)
- Three Rivers Mall – Kelso (1987–present)
- Valley Mall – Yakima (1972–present)
- Vancouver Mall – Vancouver (1977–present)
- Wenatchee Valley Mall – Wenatchee (1978–present)
- Westfield Southcenter – Tukwila (1968–present)
- Westlake Center – Seattle (1988–present)

== West Virginia ==
- Charleston Town Center – Charleston (1983–present)
- Foxcroft Towne Center at Martinsburg – Martinsburg (1992–2016)
- Grand Central Mall – Vienna (1972–present)
- Huntington Mall – Barboursville (1981–present)
- Meadowbrook Mall – Bridgeport (1982–present)
- Mercer Mall – Bluefield (1980–present)
- Morgantown Mall – Morgantown (1990–present)
- Mountaineer Mall – Morgantown (1975–present)

== Wisconsin ==
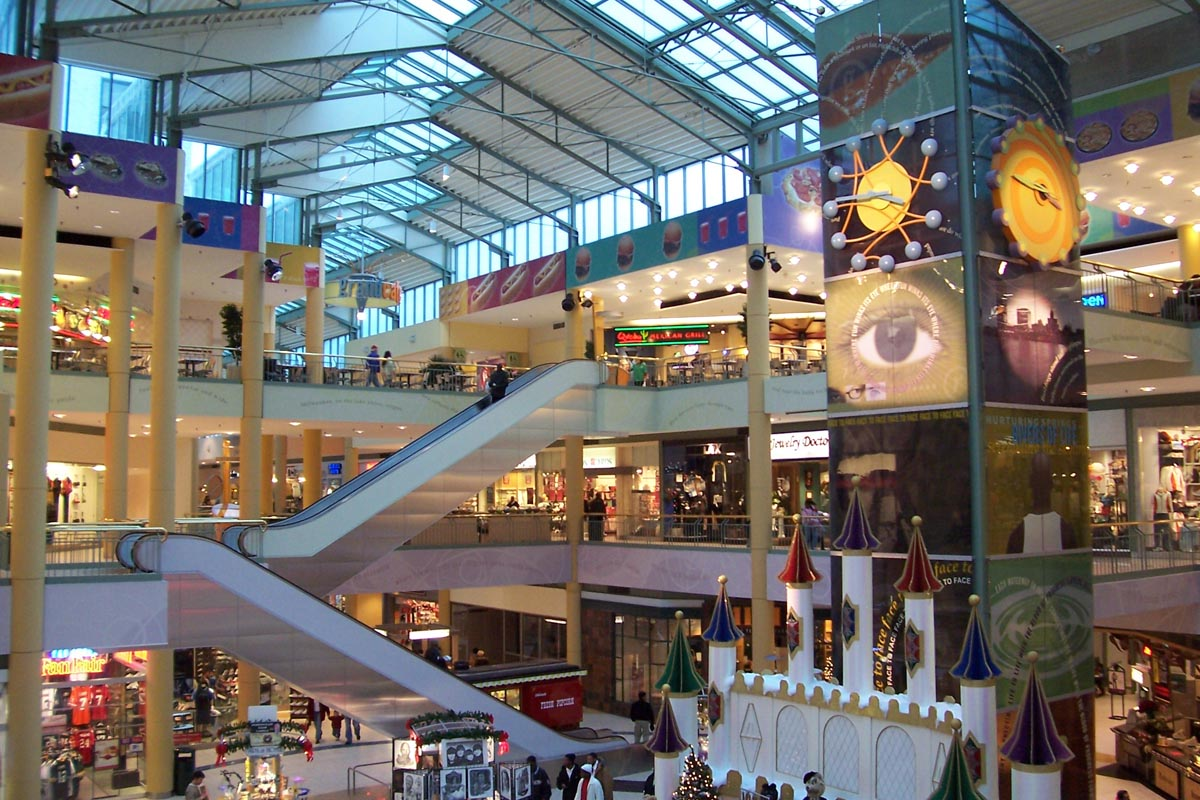
Main atrium of The Avenue, an urban shopping mall which spans three city blocks in the heart of downtown Milwaukee, Wisconsin.

- The Avenue – Milwaukee (1982–present)
- Bay Park Square – Green Bay (1980–present)
- Bayshore – Glendale (1954–present, outdoor)
- Beloit Mall – Beloit (1966–2000)
- Brookfield Square – Brookfield (1967–present)
- East Town Mall – Green Bay (1982–2021; indoor only)
- East Towne Mall – Madison (1971–present)
- Edgewater Plaza – Manitowoc (1979–2018)
- Forest Mall – Fond du Lac (1973–2020)
- Fox River Mall – Appleton (1984–present)
- Hilldale Shopping Center – Madison (1970–present)
- Mayfair Mall – Wauwatosa (1973–present)
- Memorial Mall – Sheboygan (1969–2017)
- Mid-Cities Mall – Manitowoc (1968–2000)
- Northland Mall – Appleton (1983–present)
- Northridge Mall – Milwaukee (1972–2003)
- Oakwood Mall – Eau Claire (1986–present)
- Original Outlet Mall – Kenosha (1982–2006)
- Port Plaza Mall – Green Bay (1977–2006)
- Regency Mall – Racine (1981–present)
- Southridge Mall – Greendale (1970–present)
- Uptown Janesville (formerly Janesville Mall) – Janesville (1973–present)
- Valley Fair Mall – Appleton (1955–2007)
- Valley View Mall – La Crosse (1980–present)
- Wausau Center – Wausau (1983–2021)
- Westgate Mall – Madison (1960–2021)
- West Towne Mall – Madison (1970–present)

== Wyoming ==
- Eastridge Mall – Casper (1982–present)
- Frontier Mall – Cheyenne (1981–present)
- White Mountain Mall – Rock Springs (1978–present)

== See also ==
- List of largest shopping malls in the United States
- List of shopping streets and districts by city
