= Beau Monde Mall =

Former shopping mall in Greenwood Village, Colorado

- Location: Greenwood Village, Colorado, United States
- Coordinates: 39°36′38.21″N 104°53′43.68″W
- Address: 8081 East Orchard Road
- Opened: 1985
- Closed: 1989
- Architect: Tatman Associates
- Floor area: 200,000 sq ft (19,000 m^{2})
- Floors: 2

Beau Monde Mall was a shopping mall in Greenwood Village, Colorado, United States. It was located at 8081 East Orchard Road, near Interstate 25, and opened in 1985. The building was designed by Tatman Associates and contained approximately 200,000 sq ft (19,000 m^{2}) of space.

The mall was not commercially successful and was never fully leased. In 1989, the property was sold to the ministry of Marilyn Hickey and converted for use as the Happy Church.

== History ==
Beau Monde Mall was built as a smaller upscale shopping center in the Denver metropolitan area. The Los Angeles Times described the project as a $34 million center planned for boutiques and restaurants in a wealthy suburban area. The mall had difficulty attracting tenants. In 1989, the property was sold after only a few years of retail use.

After the sale, parts of the former mall were converted for religious use.

In 1999, M. Gordon Brown published a study in the Journal of Real Estate Research comparing Beau Monde with nearby Tamarac Square.

== Architecture ==
Beau Monde's design drew inspiration from European villages. Shops were arranged along two levels of cobbled walkways, with balconies, fountains, flower boxes, and wrought-iron lamps adding to the setting. The storefronts featured terracotta, stucco, and marble, while a glass roof covered the connecting passages. Staircases housed in clock towers linked the two floors, with an elevator in one of the towers. Both levels could be reached directly from the parking areas.

== Conversion to church ==
After the mall failed as a retail center, it was purchased in 1989 by Pastor Wallace Hickey's Happy Church and converted for religious use. The Los Angeles Times reported that the ministry of televangelist Marilyn Hickey bought Beau Monde for $6.5 million after it went to auction, using the former mall as the new headquarters for the 3,000-member Happy Church.

The church was later known as Orchard Road Christian Center. In 2017, Alberta Development purchased the ten-acre property at 8081 East Orchard Road.

== Redevelopment ==
The City of Greenwood Village approved redevelopment of the former Marilyn Hickey property at 8081 East Orchard Road with a Whole Foods grocery store, two freestanding retail pads, and 54 brownstone homes. Demolition of the existing building could begin after final plat and subdivision approvals.

== See also ==
- Tamarac Square
- Cinderella City
- Crossroads Mall (Colorado)
- Westminster Mall (Colorado)
- Buckingham Square
- Villa Italia Mall
- Southglenn Mall
