= Tamarac Square =

Former shopping center in Denver, Colorado

- Location: Denver, Colorado, United States
- Coordinates: 39°39′17.38″N 104°54′00.28″W
- Opened: 1976
- Closed: 2011
- Num. of stores: 90
- Floor area: 175,000 sq ft (16,300 m^{2})
- Floors: 2

Tamarac Square was a shopping center in southeast Denver, Colorado, United States. It was located near East Hampden Avenue and Tamarac Drive. The center opened in 1976 with about 90 stores, restaurants, a food court, and a six-screen movie theater.

== History ==
Tamarac Square was built beginning in 1974 and opened in 1976. It was still partly leased when it opened. Hyde Park Jewelers opened its first store at the center the same year.

Tamarac Square was developed by Trammell Crow as a specialty shopping center intended to offer an alternative to larger regional malls. Its two-level interior included a skylit courtyard and an area known as Artisans' Way, where approximately 30 artists and craftspeople worked and sold their products. The retail portion of the development cost about $15 million. Around 60 percent of the available space was occupied at the time of opening, and the remaining phases of the development were completed by 1982.

The center was renovated in 1992. A fire in 1994 damaged several stores and caused about $1 million in water damage from the sprinkler system.

In a study published in 1999, researcher M. Gordon Brown compared the interior layouts of Tamarac Square and Beau Monde, another shopping center in the Denver area. Using floor plans and observations made in 1988 and 1989, Brown found that Tamarac Square had a more interconnected arrangement of walkways and entrances. In contrast, Beau Monde's circulation routes were less directly connected to its main shopping areas.

Developers Diversified Realty Corporation bought the property in 2001. By July 2010, only three tenants remained in the main building: Rodney's, the Mizel Arts and Culture Center, and Regency Cinemas. Westword reported in August 2010 that the mostly vacant center was expected to be demolished.

Rodney's closed in January 2011 after 19 years at Tamarac Square. After its closure, Regency Cinemas was the only business still open inside the center. Tamarac Square was vacated in early 2011 and demolished later that year.

== Redevelopment ==
Target Corporation bought the site in 2012. The Denver Urban Renewal Authority approved $5 million in tax increment financing reimbursement for the work. CBS Colorado said the money was for infrastructure work near Tamarac and Hampden.

A 135,000 sq ft (12,500 m^{2}) Target store opened on the property in July 2013.

== Current use ==
The site of the former Tamarac Square mall is now occupied by a 135,000-square-foot Target store, which opened in July 2013. Located at 7777 East Hampden Avenue, the store continues to operate under the name Target Denver SE. As of 2026, it also houses a CVS pharmacy and a Starbucks café.

Not all of the surrounding commercial buildings were demolished during the redevelopment. Plans announced in 2012 included renovations to a neighboring 33,000-square-foot retail center, where Ace Hardware was expected to remain. The existing Benihana restaurant, housed in a separate building near the former mall, was also retained.

The neighboring Tamarac Shopping Center continued to operate as a separate retail property. In January 2018, the Colorado Real Estate Journal reported its sale for $20 million. Located at 3333 South Tamarac Drive, the 68,534-square-foot property included a strip shopping center with 12 tenants, along with three freestanding commercial buildings. At the time of the sale, these buildings were occupied by Chick-fil-A, Benihana, and Bank of the West. The Target store served as a nearby retail anchor but was not part of the property sold.

== See also ==
- Beau Monde Mall
- Cinderella City
- Crossroads Mall (Colorado)
- Westminster Mall (Colorado)
- Buckingham Square
- Villa Italia Mall
- Southglenn Mall
