= Denis Podorojniy =

Christian pastor, religious leader, preacher, televangelist

- Born: December 11, 1971 (age 54); Tashkent, Soviet Union
- Occupations: pastor, preacher, religious scholar
- Spouse: Marina Podorozhnia
- Children: David, Daniel, Mishel
- Website: domnaskale.org

Denis Mikhailovich Podorojniy (born December 11, 1971, Tashkent, Soviet Union) is a Christian pastor, religious leader, preacher, televangelist, religious scholar, and Doctor of Theology. He is the founder and senior pastor of the Tashkent City Church of Christ, officially registered in 1999. Since the early 1990s, he has been actively involved in religious activities both in Uzbekistan and internationally. He has preached on Christian television networks such as TBN and CNL and has participated in interchurch events across Central Asia, Europe, and North America. In the 2010s, he was one of the organizers of the Religious Center Union of Christian Churches of Ukraine Religion Organization (UCCU).

== Early life ==
=== Origins and family ===
Denis Podorojniy was born on December 11, 1971, in the city of Tashkent into a family of intellectuals. His father, Mikhail Vasilyevich Podorojniy, was a lecturer in higher mathematics at National University of Uzbekistan, where he spent many years engaged in teaching and research. His mother, Natalia Vladimirovna, worked as an architect.

=== Education ===
Podorojniy initially studied at the Faculty of Applied Mathematics at the National University of Uzbekistan named after Mirzo Ulugbek but left during his third year.

In 1991, he completed a three-month Bible school course (from January 15 to April 15, 1991) at the "Word of Faith" Church in Vilnius, conducted in Russian.

In 2001, he underwent nine months of training at the international "Word of Life" school.

In 2006, he graduated from the Russian Christian Humanitarian Academy (RCHA) in Saint Petersburg with a degree in Religious Studies, earning the qualification of religious scholar.

In 2009, he was awarded an honorary Doctor of Theology degree by the Latin University of Theology (Inglewood, California, USA).

== Pastor activities ==
=== Beginning of ministry ===
In March 1989, Podorojniy joined a Pentecostal church in Tashkent, led by Pastor Sergey Nechitaylo. In April of the same year, he underwent baptism and subsequently began participating in church activities.

=== Church establishment ===
In September 1991, together with a group of adherents, Podorojniy founded the charismatic church "Word of Faith" in Tashkent. In December of the same year, he was elected pastor. The church organized a network of home groups, carried out evangelistic work, and launched its first Bible school.

Group photo of students and teachers of the first Bible School of the “Word of Faith” Church in Tashkent. Academic year: 1993–1994

The Bible school, established in 1993, reportedly enrolled about 230 students, of whom 165 completed the course. Group photographs of students and teachers from the 1993–1994 period have been preserved.

=== Persecution ===
In June 1994, the "Word of Faith" Church in Tashkent was closed by government authorities. Church services were suspended, the premises were sealed, and all activities were banned.

In 1996, Podorojniy was arrested and spent 12 days in detention. According to a report by the U.S. Helsinki Commission, he was repeatedly detained without access to legal counsel, and the church experienced pressure from law enforcement agencies.

These events took place in the broader context of increasing restrictions on religious freedom in Uzbekistan, following the adoption of new legislation regulating religious organizations.

=== Church in Tashkent ===
The Tashkent City Church of Christ was officially registered on August 19, 1999. The church is located at Salar Buyi, 1st Dead End, No. 13, in the Mirzo-Ulugbek district of Tashkent. Its registration was carried out in accordance with the legal requirements of the Republic of Uzbekistan.

Since its registration, the church has developed various areas of activity, including youth meetings, educational seminars, and Bible courses. It has also organized musical and social initiatives aimed at supporting families and vulnerable groups.

As of early 2010, the congregation was regarded as one of the largest evangelical churches in Uzbekistan, with more than 1,000 regular attendees. The church is a member of the Union of Evangelical and Protestant Churches of Uzbekistan and takes part in its activities.

=== International activities ===
Since the 1990s, Podorojniy has preached in Russia, Ukraine, Germany, South Korea, Kazakhstan, Armenia, Sweden, Israel, the United States, Turkey, India, Italy, South Africa, and other countries.

In 2015–2016, Denis Podorojniy participated in nationwide events, including speaking at MalinFest and conducting thematic seminars at the Ukrainian Evangelical Theological Seminary.

In 2019, he participated in the Eastern European Leadership Forum.

He was also involved in the PLP platform in Ukraine.

From 2015 to 2020, he served as the head of the Religious Center Union of Christian Churches of Ukraine Religion Organization (UCCU).

=== Ministry ===
Following its official registration, the church organized evangelistic gatherings, educational seminars, and prayer conferences.

Podorojniy was influenced by several international Christian leaders, including Ulf Ekman, Lester Sumrall, Edwin Louis Cole, and Marilyn Hickey. Their sermons, books, and participation in international conferences contributed to the development of his theological approach and ministry strategies.

=== Media ===
- His sermons were broadcast on the Christian television networks TBN and CNL. In the mid-2000s, Podorojniy actively collaborated with the CNL (Christian New Life) television network, serving as a speaker and contributing to the development and expansion of the channel among Russian-speaking audiences. This collaboration helped broaden CNL’s broadcasting reach across Europe, Central Asia, and the Middle East.
- He founded the YouTube channel for the ministry "Дом на скале" (House on the Rock).
- He hosted a video series titled "3 минуты Библии" (3 Minutes of the Bible), featuring short biblical reflections.
- He authored the newsletter "Напиши мне.инфо" (Write me.info), which is now archived.

== Political views ==
=== Position on the war in Ukraine ===
Before the full-scale Russian invasion of Ukraine on February 24, 2022, Podorojniy lived in Irpin, from where his family was evacuated.

In April 2022, he published an open letter to Sergey Ryakhovsky, the presiding bishop of the Russian United Union of Christians of the Evangelical Faith, in which he criticized Ryakhovsky’s position on the invasion. The Religious Center Union of Christian Churches of Ukraine Religion Organization (UCCU) issued an official statement condemning Russia’s military actions. On April 12, 2022, Podorozhniy wrote: "There is blood of murdered Ukrainians on your hands…"

== Personal life ==
=== Illness ===
In late 2020, Podorojniy was diagnosed with stage IV glioblastoma, an aggressive type of brain tumor. The first neurosurgical operation was performed on January 27, 2021, at the International Neuroscience Institute (INI) in Hanover, under the direction of Professor Majid Samii.

In March 2022, he underwent a second tumor removal surgery at the University Hospital of Düsseldorf (Department of Surgery). Following these surgeries, he received courses of radiation and chemotherapy. As a result of the medical treatments, he experienced temporary speech difficulties, including problems with articulation.

=== Family ===
On October 4, 1992, Podorojniy married Marina Podorozhnia. They have three children: David, Daniel, and Mishel.

During her husband’s illness and rehabilitation, Marina continued to oversee church activities and supervised the reconstruction of the church building. In 2022, construction and technical outfitting of a new hall were completed, which became the permanent venue for worship services, conferences, and gatherings.

Denis Podorojniy is preaching in the church’s tent building, 2002

Interior of the new church hall after reconstruction, 2022
