= Joslins =

Defunct American department store

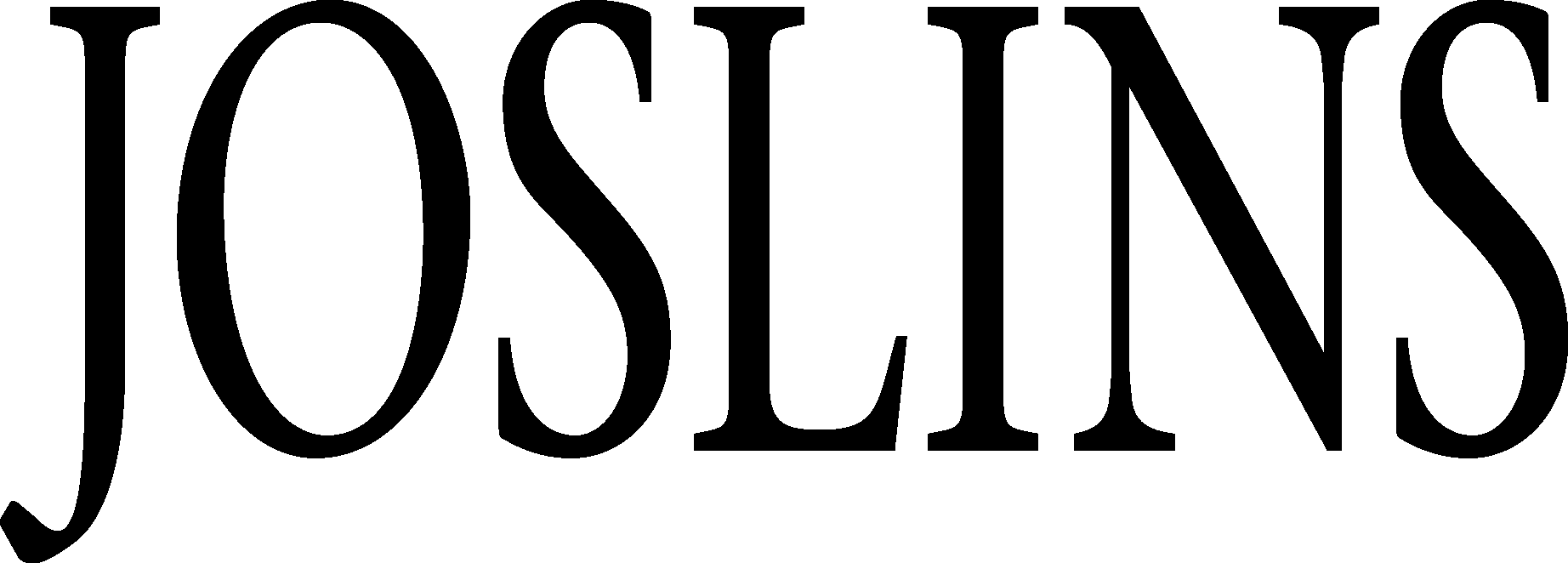
- Company type: Department store
- Industry: Retail
- Founded: 1873; 153 years ago in Denver, Colorado, United States
- Founder: John Jay Joslin
- Defunct: 1998
- Fate: Converted to Dillard's
- Headquarters: Denver, Colorado
- Products: Clothing, footwear, bedding, furniture, jewelry, beauty products, electronics and housewares

Joslins was a chain of department stores that was based in Denver, Colorado, United States.

== History ==
Joslins Department Store began as J. Joslins Dry Goods Store, founded by John Jay Joslin in 1873; it was a direct competitor to The Denver Dry Goods Company which commenced operations in 1888. The original Joslin Dry Goods Company Building is on the U.S. National Register of Historic Places, and is currently a Courtyard by Marriott property.

Around 1910, Joslin sold the business to H.B. Claflin & Company, which collapsed in 1914. Two store chains were created from the bankruptcy: Associated Dry Goods and Mercantile Stores Company, Inc. As a nameplate of Mercantile Stores, Joslins became the first Denver-based department store to build branch locations in the 1940s, later expanding the chain with larger anchor stores in malls in the 1960s and 1970s.

Logo from 1969 to 1994

In 1998, the Dillard's department store chain purchased Mercantile Stores, converting most of the then-existing Joslin's stores to Dillard's stores. One former Joslin's store in Colorado Springs and the recently opened flagship store at Park Meadows in Lone Tree were sold by Dillard's to The May Department Stores Company, which converted the Colorado Springs store to a Foley's and the Park Meadows store to the Denver area's second Lord & Taylor store.

== Locations ==
Location	Address	Opened	Closed	Disposition
Downtown Denver	934 16th Street, Denver	1873	1995	redeveloped into Courtyard by Marriott, 1996 building received National Historic Register designation, 1997
Greeley	825-827 Eighth St, Greeley	1944	1973	moved to 1015 9th Ave, 1963 replaced by Greeley Mall location, 1973
Englewood	3470 S Broadway, Englewood	1945	1954	Nielsen's Department Store acquired in 1945 replaced by 3315 South Broadway location
Lakewood	7308 W Colfax Ave, Lakewood	1946	1957	replaced by JCRS Shopping Center location
Aurora	9620 E Colfax Ave, Aurora	1949		
Merchants' Park Shopping Center	627 S Broadway, Denver	1952		
Englewood	3315 S Broadway, Englewood	1954		
Boulder	1919 14th St, Boulder	1956	1980	first three/four floors of Colorado Building remodeled into offices
Lakewood	JCRS Shopping Center, 6715 W Colfax Ave, Lakewood	1957	early 1970s	space redeveloped into Casa Bonita
Villa Italia	7200 W Alameda Ave, Lakewood	1966	2000	converted to a Dillard's store, 1998 redeveloped for Belmar
Pueblo	southeast corner of Main Street and W 4th Street, Pueblo	1970	1976	Crews-Beggs Dry Goods Co acquired in 1959, changed to Joslin's name in 1970 replaced by Pueblo Mall location, 1976
Cinderella City	Englewood	1968	1995	replaced by Southglenn Mall location, 1995
Buckingham Square Mall	1440 S Havana St, Aurora	1971	2005	converted to a Dillard's store, 1998 redeveloped for The Gardens on Havana
Greeley Mall	2050 Greeley Mall, Greeley	1973	2008	converted to a Dillard's store, 1998 closed, 2008
Pueblo Mall	3601 Dillon Dr, Pueblo	1976		converted to a Dillard's store, 1998
Westminster Mall	5433 W 88th Ave, Westminster	1977	2011	converted to a Dillard's store, 1998 closed, 2011
Southwest Plaza	8501 W Bowles Ave, Littleton	1983	2006	converted to a Dillard's store, 1998 converted to a Dick's Sporting Goods and Steve & Barry's, 2006
Frontier Mall	1400 Dell Range Blvd, Cheyenne, WY	1983	2021	converted to a Dillard's store, 1998 closed, 2021 location purchased by Appliance Factory & Mattress Kingdom, 2023
Chapel Hills Mall	1750 Briargate Blvd, Colorado Springs	1985	1998	location purchased by May and converted to Foley's, 1998 converted to a Macy's, 2006
Twin Peaks Mall	1250 S Hover St, Longmont	1985	c. 2008	converted to a Dillard's store, 1998 redeveloped for Village at the Peaks, 2014
Southglenn Mall	6911 S University Blvd, Centennial	1994	2006	converted to a Dillard's store, 1998 redeveloped for The Streets at SouthGlenn, 2006
Park Meadows	8425 Park Meadows Center Dr, Lone Tree	1997	1998	location purchased by May, 1998, and converted to Lord & Taylor, 1999
