= Westminster Mall =

Westminster Mall may refer to:

- Westminster Mall (California), in Westminster, California
- Westminster Mall (Colorado), in Westminster, Colorado
- The Mall, London, located in the City of Westminster
