= Frontier Mall =

Shopping mall in Cheyenne, Wyoming, U.S.

Coordinates: 41.162114°N 104.805579°W

- Location: Cheyenne, Wyoming, U.S.
- Address: 1400 Dell Range Blvd
- Opened: March 18, 1981
- Manager: CBL Properties
- Owner: CBL Properties
- Num. of stores: 67
- Num. of anchor tenants: 5
- Floor area: 519,471 sq ft (48,260.4 m^{2})
- Floors: 1
- Website: frontiermall.com

Frontier Mall is an enclosed shopping mall located along Dell Range Blvd in Cheyenne, Wyoming, United States. The single-level, 519,471-square-foot (48,260.4 m^{2}) mall opened March 18, 1981. Managed by CBL Properties of Chattanooga, Tennessee, it is Wyoming's second largest mall, boasting 67 shops, including five anchor stores: JCPenney, Dillard’s, Bomgaars, Planet Fitness, and Appliance Factory Mattress Kingdom.

== History ==
Frontier Mall was announced in October 1978 and would originally be 550,000 square feet (51,000 m^{2}) large. It was developed by CBL & Associates Properties of Chattanooga, Tennessee. Construction began the following year, and the Sears location was the first to open on October 8, 1980, months before completion of the rest of the mall. Other areas of the mall remained under construction until they were completed in March 1981. The mall's interior tenants included Chick-Fil-A, Denim Connection, Foxmoor, Kinney Shoes, Taco Etc., Thom McAn, Western Ranchman Outfitters, and Zales' Jewelers.

In 1983, an 80,000-square-foot (7,400 m^{2}) Joslins anchor store was built, which became Dillard's in 1998 after Joslins was purchased by the company. Chain store Jo-Ann Fabrics and Crafts opened a new store on September 15, 2011. The Frontier Mall's Jo-Ann store would replace several smaller tenants including Twills, Natural Lites, a former Asian Gifts storefront, and a former RadioShack storefront.

Sports Authority closed their store in 2016 in addition to closing the remaining stores still open after filing for Chapter 11 bankruptcy and converting it to Chapter 7. In November 2017, the Sears store was announced to close, liquidation starting before the end of the year and the store closing in January 2018. In the same month, Planet Fitness was in the process of opening in the former Sports Authority; the new gym would open in February 2018.

JAX Mercantile Company would begin working to open a new JAX Outdoor Gear, Farm and Ranch store in the former Sears space in 2019, opening in late November. The Frontier Mall's JAX store would be the eighth location of the normal, full-line JAX stores. In May 2023, an Appliance Factory & Mattress Kingdom location opened in the former Dillard’s Clearance Center, which closed in November 2021.

Bomgaars, a department store chain that sells a variety of American farming and ranch supplies, expressed interest in opening a store in the Jax Outdoor Gear location. The owners of Jax Outdoor Gear located agreed and the store was eventually rebranded as Bomgaars. The store opened in late 2024.

Tilt Arcade announced it would open an arcade at the mall near Bomgaars. The arcade opened in summer 2026.
