= Cinderella City =

Cinderella City Mall
- Early advertisement for Cinderella City Mall
- Location: Englewood, Colorado
- Coordinates: 39.65°N 105°W
- Opened: March 7, 1968; 58 years ago
- Closed: 1997; 29 years ago (demolished late 1998– 1999)
- Developer: Gerri von Frellick
- Owner: The Kravco Company
- Num. of stores: 200 at peak
- Num. of anchor tenants: 0 (4 at its peak)
- Floor area: 1,400,000 square feet (130,000 m^{2})
- Floors: 3

Cinderella City Mall was a large shopping center located in Englewood, Colorado, United States. The mall was officially opened for business on March 7, 1968, and demolished in 1999. It once was the largest covered shopping center west of the Mississippi River.

The mall was successful when it opened in 1968. However, in the late 1970s and the 1980s, new competition from other malls in the area harmed sales for Cinderella City, and the building itself was also plagued with structural problems. While a remodel in the 1980s temporarily improved sales, the mall continued to decline, and stores began to close in the early 1990s. The last store in the mall closed in 1997, and demolition began in late 1998. The land is now occupied by a transit-oriented development,

== Layout ==
The mall featured four sections: Rose Mall, Gold Mall, Shamrock Mall, and Cinder Alley. Cinder Alley, one of the two basement corridors in the mall, simulated a New York City street, complete with outdoor-esque facades and streetlamps. The ceiling tiles were painted black to simulate a "night on the town" effect.

The Shamrock Mall and Cinder Alley were not linked. To go from one mall to the other, one had to go up to the fountain area to cross over. This allowed for an automobile underpass, thus allowing Cinderella City patrons to search for parking spaces without having to drive around the mall's massive exterior.

The Center Court area was known as the Blue Mall. The names and large head and shoulder shadow profiles of those responsible for the building of Cinderella City were memorialized on the floor of the Blue Mall.

The original southwest anchor of the mall was Cinderella City Cinema. The cinema had no interior mall entrance, only its own exterior entrance. The entrance was marked by two-story arches that mimicked those in the center fountain area. The cinema also had a unique feature in that all the toilet stalls in the restrooms had their own sinks and vanity areas.

== History ==
=== Construction ===
In the early 1960s, developer Gerri Von Frellick proposed to build a new shopping center on what was then the KLZ (560 AM) radio tower property in Denver. Neighboring residents around the proposed property were asked for their opinion on the new shopping center, and fearing a disruption in their community, rejected the idea, and in turn the zoning board did the same.

After being rejected in Denver, Von Frellick approached Englewood in an attempt to buy a park spanning more than 60 acres (240,000 m^{2}) to build his mall. The park sat directly opposite the Englewood City Hall and the Englewood Public Library. The zoning board accepted his proposal.

The newly purchased area was rectangular in that it was longer east/west than it was north/south. Von Frellick would not let the area restrict the mall's size, so he designed it with an unorthodox shape. Viewed from above, the mall had the shape of the letter "M". Each leg of the "M" shape would have a code name. On the second floor, the western wing of the mall was named Rose Mall, and the eastern wing was named Gold Mall. On the bottom floor, the corridors were Shamrock Mall and Sunflower Mall, respectively. The original plans called for a structure with a one block cylindrical center court, four anchors, and surrounded in parking garages. As the plan was eventually refined, the "M" shape remained, although minor changes were made to other components. During the design process, Sunflower Mall became Cinder Alley.

Von Frellick's original name for the creation was "Cinderella City," which Englewood city officials did not support. After months of debating, the name, a combination of Von Frellick's original idea, and ideas from the community, was officially "New Englewood: The Cinderella City." The name was shortened to "Cinderella City" just months after its opening.

Construction of the 1,350,000-square-foot (125,000 m^{2}) structure was difficult due to the sheer size of the project but was also complicated by the fact that the land was a landfill prior to being a park. The landfill deteriorated the soil, and installing the massive concrete pillars was a daunting task because the soil was so far eroded, causing severe settlement.

On March 7, 1968, the mall officially opened. However, the east anchor, along with adjacent stores and corridors, was still under construction. Pedestrian and vehicular traffic was routed around these areas. Dedication and official opening of the mall was marked by Von Frellick's wife turning on the 35-foot (11 m) fountain in the center court. Over 20,000 people attended the first grand opening. A few weeks later, after the east end of the mall was finished, a second grand opening was held to officially dedicate the rest of the stores.

=== 1970s ===
Through the early 1970s, Cinderella City was very successful. Over 15,000 people visited the mall daily. Management received hundreds of applications from potential tenants, although all spaces were filled. For the first few years, the mall's 14,000 parking spaces were filled to capacity and some visitors had to park in blocks surrounding the mall.

Guy "Yug" London, a professional artist, painted surrealistic work in a public area in the mall. He initially sold these paintings in the center court, and later moved to Cinder Alley.

Originally designed as a single large screen theater, the cinema was unable to compete with the area's growing multi-plex cinemas. It closed for renovation and reopened as a two screen multi-plex. This however was not enough to stave off the competition of theaters with more screens. Eventually the cinema closed and was bulldozed, leaving Neusteter's as the southwest anchor.

During a routine structural inspection, workers found cracking on a pillar in the JCPenney store on the mall's north side. Fearing a structural failure, they checked other places for similar fractures, and found the massive parking deck was also becoming unsafe. The mall closed for over two months for structural repairs.

=== 1980s ===
Rose Mall following the 1981-1984 renovation.

As other shopping center competition popped up, Cinderella City management, now in the hands of KRAVCO, decided to embark on an enormous renovation project for the mall that would last three years, 1981 to 1984. The renovation plan changed almost everything except for the basic layout of the mall. The original concrete floors were replaced with parquetry. Skylights and square holes were added in some concourses, allowing shoppers on the first floor to view the basement shoppers, as well as allowing more light into the basement areas. However, the light did not reach Cinder Alley. One of the largest aspects of the renovation was removing the 35-foot (11 m) fountain along with its massive plumbing from the center court. A section of parking garage under the center court was replaced with a food court. Additionally, the floor of the center court was modified to integrate the new food court with the remainder of the mall, by way of large squares cut into the floor to allow light to pass through. A large tree was also installed, which grew from the food court level through to the center court above.

This modification of the original design also took away the automobile underpass that allowed drivers to avoid driving all the way around the mall to find a parking space.

In addition to interior changes, another change concerned the southwest anchor, Colorado-based store, Neusteter's. This building was demolished and became the top-scale Broadway Southwest store, which later became May D&F and subsequently Foley's.

In the mid 1980s, new shopping malls around Colorado began opening, posing threats to Cinderella City's financial status and reputation, including Southwest Plaza, which opened in 1983 (the May D&F anchor opened in time for Christmas 1982), and Cherry Creek Mall, which underwent a renovation and reopened in August 1990 with many upscale anchors and boutiques. Each brought new designs and new tenants, causing Cinderella City to appear dated.

Cinder Alley's collection of oddball stores and head shops were forced out during renovations, leaving it empty except for two arcades.

=== 1990s ===
One of the main entrances of the deserted Cinderella City Mall during its vacant days.

Although the newly renovated mall rejuvenated foot traffic and sales, continued competition, as well as more physical problems with the mall structure itself, caused tenants to begin leaving the mall in the early 1990s. Gated storefronts became more and more prevalent as time wore on, until, in the mid 1990s, entire anchors began to close. Foley's, at the west end of the mall, was the first to leave in early 1994. JCPenney closed their store a few months later. With their demise, the Gold Mall and Cinder Alley corridors were eventually closed to the public.

Following this trend, the remaining 100 or so tenants that occupied the facility also began to leave. Joslins, anchoring the east wing of the mall, closed in 1995 to relocate to nearby SouthGlenn Mall. The last remaining anchor, Montgomery Ward, remained in the semi-abandoned mall until December 1997, when it was forced to end its lease so the property could be redeveloped. This officially marked the operational end for Cinderella City.

== Redevelopment ==
During the following years, the City of Englewood would create, revise, and reject in excess of 30 plans to redevelop the Cinderella City site. Plans ranged from complete demolition and turning the land into a park, to keeping the structure and converting it to an art museum. During this planning process, Cinderella City sat empty and decaying for two years.

In 1998, a final plan was adopted to rehabilitate the area with transit-oriented development. Catalyzed by a future Regional Transportation District (RTD) light rail station, Englewood planned on remaking the former mall site as a "downtown", complete with luxury apartments, mixed-use retail and residential buildings, and "big box" stores such as Walmart, Office Depot, and The Sports Authority.

Beginning in late 1998, the demolition process began. Due to the presence of asbestos and lead-based paint in the mall, as well as oil and gas hazards at the JCPenney Auto Center, Englewood had to form a new committee for large-scale environmental cleanups.

During the long asbestos abatement process, immigrant workers were caught engaging in misconduct inside of the mall, reportedly throwing hazardous materials at each other. An inspector reported the incident and requested that the abatement process come to a halt. During the abatement, progress was slow due to lack of funds and labor but following the city's decision to terminate the asbestos abatement phase, the demolition was quickly carried out.

To demolish the structure, the team used large bulldozers and drove through the mall, demolishing everything except for the structural members themselves. When asbestos was a problem, a specialized demolition robot was used.

The east end, last to be completed in 1968 during the original construction, was the first to be demolished, with the exception of the JCPenney Auto Center. The demolition crew worked from east to west, and as one part of the structure was completely removed, construction on replacement structures began. The only original structure left in the redevelopment was the former Foley's building, which was renovated to house the new Englewood Public Library and City Hall.
