= Twenty Ninth Street (Boulder, Colorado) =

Retail center in Boulder, Colorado

Coordinates: 40.01822°N 105.25585°W

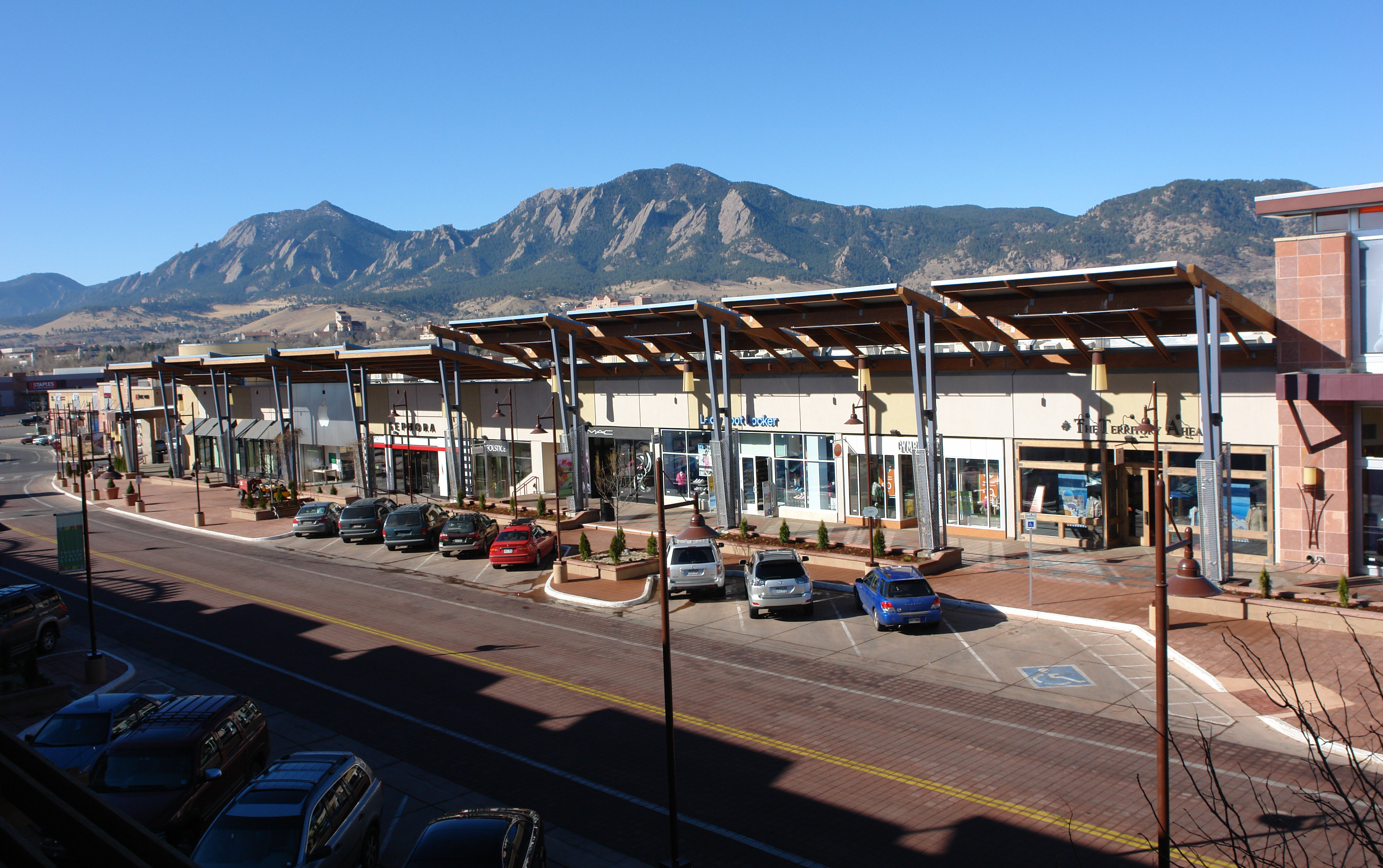
A strip mall section in the 29th Street retail center

Twenty Ninth Street is a retail center in Boulder, Colorado (managed by The Macerich Company) that opened on October 13, 2006 on the former site of Crossroads Mall.

The center is separated into three distinct neighborhoods connected by a series of streets, walkways, terraces, plazas and other outdoor community gathering spaces. The center is anchored by Home Depot, Century Theaters, Staples, and Life Time. The center also features several major retailers (Apple Store, Sephora, Trader Joe's, Anthropologie, and Carhartt) as well as several restaurants (Chipotle, Call Your Mother, Potbelly, Birdcall, Kura Sushi, Noodles & Company, and Panera).

== Description ==
The Twenty Ninth Street logo.

This district, unlike the mall that preceded it, consists of a collection of small strip malls and big-box stores, separated by streets that carry automobile traffic. It is not a mall as that term is ordinarily understood. The center is actually considered an open-air "lifestyle center" combining retail, office, entertainment and dining offerings.

The center is somewhat unique in that the sections of the three (otherwise city-owned) streets that intersect the property are actually owned by Twenty Ninth Street. These are Canyon Boulevard and Walnut Street (between 28th Street and 30th Street) and 29th Street (between Walnut Street and Arapahoe Avenue). The McDonald's and Burger King, which appear to be part of the center, are actually situated on unaffiliated property.

== History ==
- From 1979 to 2002, various Crossroads Mall reconstruction ideas were floated and then rejected. Fast-track construction of a Dillard's store was proposed, but vetoed by Foley's (later rebranded to Macy's).
- In June 2002, the owners of Flatiron Crossing Mall (Westcor) merged with the owners of Crossroads Mall (Macerich).
- On January 23, 2003, the Sears store at Crossroads Mall closed. Plans were submitted to the city to tear down the rest of Crossroads Mall and create a new retail district, dubbed Twenty Ninth Street. The plans were for about 50-60 shops and a movie theatre. The city agreed, and Macerich/Westcor sprang into action.
- On January 8, 2004, the closing of Crossroads Mall was announced. The mall closed in February 2004, except for Foley's, which remained in continuous operation.
- Crossroads Mall was demolished (except for the Mervyn's building, Foley's/Macy's and its adjacent parking structure), and on October 13, 2006, the new Twenty Ninth Street retail district opened.
- A science-based theme was used for official opening with Thomas Dolby performing.
- Macy's announced that it would close its store in January 2022. It is the last store from the original mall.

== Trivia ==
- The center's parking tends to be overrun on Memorial Day because the starting line for the Bolder Boulder 10k race is situated near the property's northeast corner (at 30th & Walnut Streets). The queue of waiting runners trails south down 30th (along the property's eastern edge) toward Arapahoe Ave.
