= Pueblo Mall =

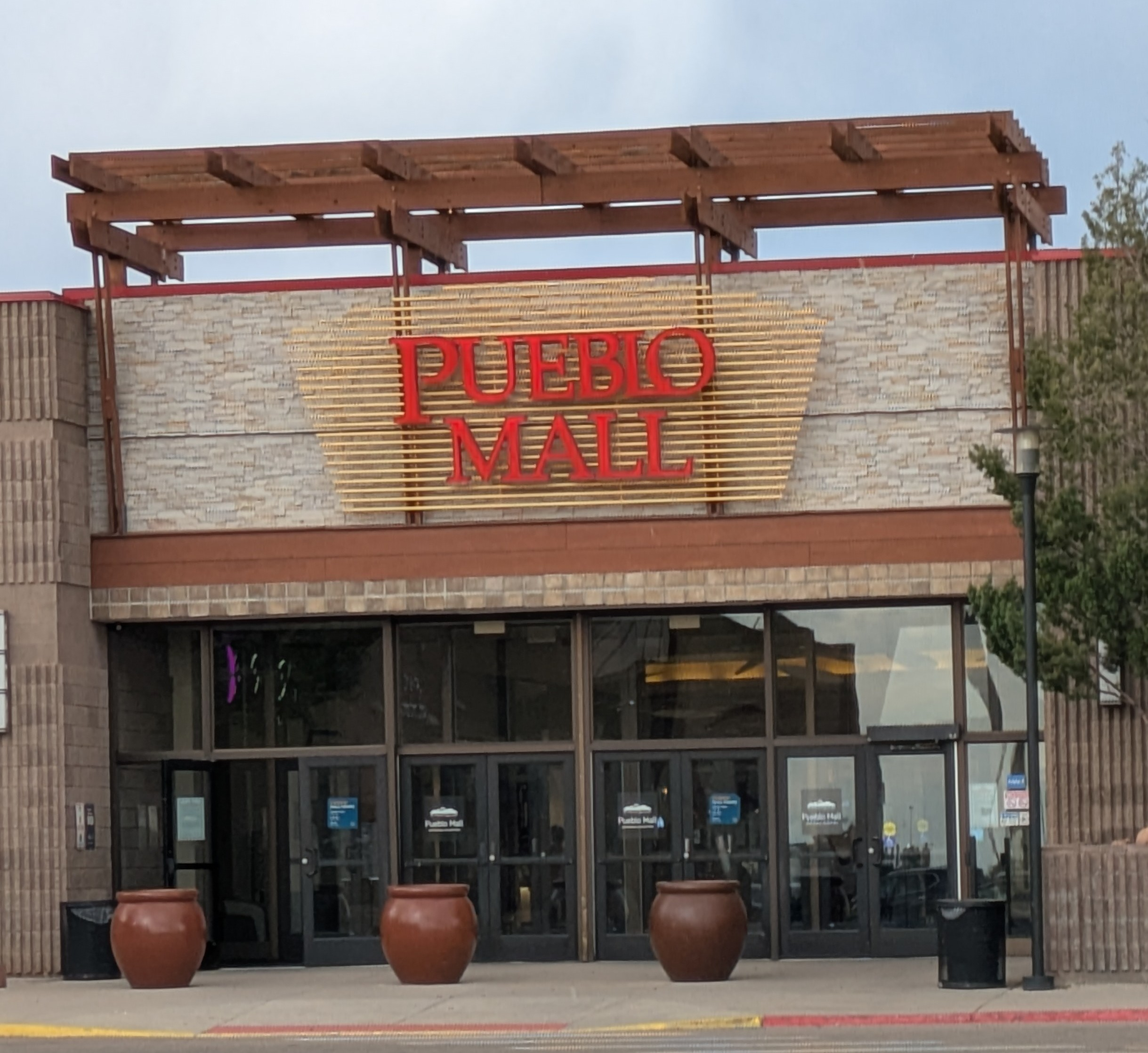
- One of the entrances to the mall
- Location: Pueblo, Colorado, U.S.
- Coordinates: 38°18′11″N 104°36′31″W
- Address: 3429 Dillon Drive
- Opened: 1976; 50 years ago
- Developer: The Hahn Company
- Owner: Centennial Real Estate
- Num. of stores: 80+
- Num. of anchor tenants: 4 (3 open, 1 vacant)
- Floor area: 575,000 square feet (53,400 m^{2})
- Floors: 1

Pueblo Mall is a shopping mall in Pueblo, Colorado, U.S. Opened in 1976, the mall features Dillard's and J. C. Penney as its anchor stores. Other major tenants of the mall include Planet Fitness and Altitude Trampoline Park. The mall is managed and owned by Centennial Real Estate.

== History ==
Pueblo Mall opened in 1976. Developed by The Hahn Company, it originally featured Montgomery Ward, The Denver Dry Goods Company, Joslins, and J. C. Penney as its anchor stores. Joslins replaced an existing store in downtown Pueblo. The Denver Dry Goods went out of business in 1987 and sold its store to Mervyn's. In 1998, the entire Joslins chain was sold to Dillard's. Montgomery Ward went out of business in 2001 and became Sears, which relocated from Midtown Shopping Center.

After Mervyn's closed all of its Colorado locations in 2005, a portion of its store became Sports Authority. As that chain did not use the entirety of the building, the back portion remained vacant until 2014, when Planet Fitness occupied the remaining space. Sports Authority went out of business in 2016 and was replaced in 2019 by a trampoline park called Altitude Trampoline Park. Sears closed in 2019 as well. In February 2025, Jo-ann Fabrics announced that it would be closing its location at the mall.

In 2017, an article in The Washington Post acknowledged Pueblo Mall as an example of a smaller shopping mall that has maintained success even in the wake of online shopping, noting the variety of stores, the significant size of the market area, and the high median income surrounding the city of Pueblo.
