= Southwest Plaza =

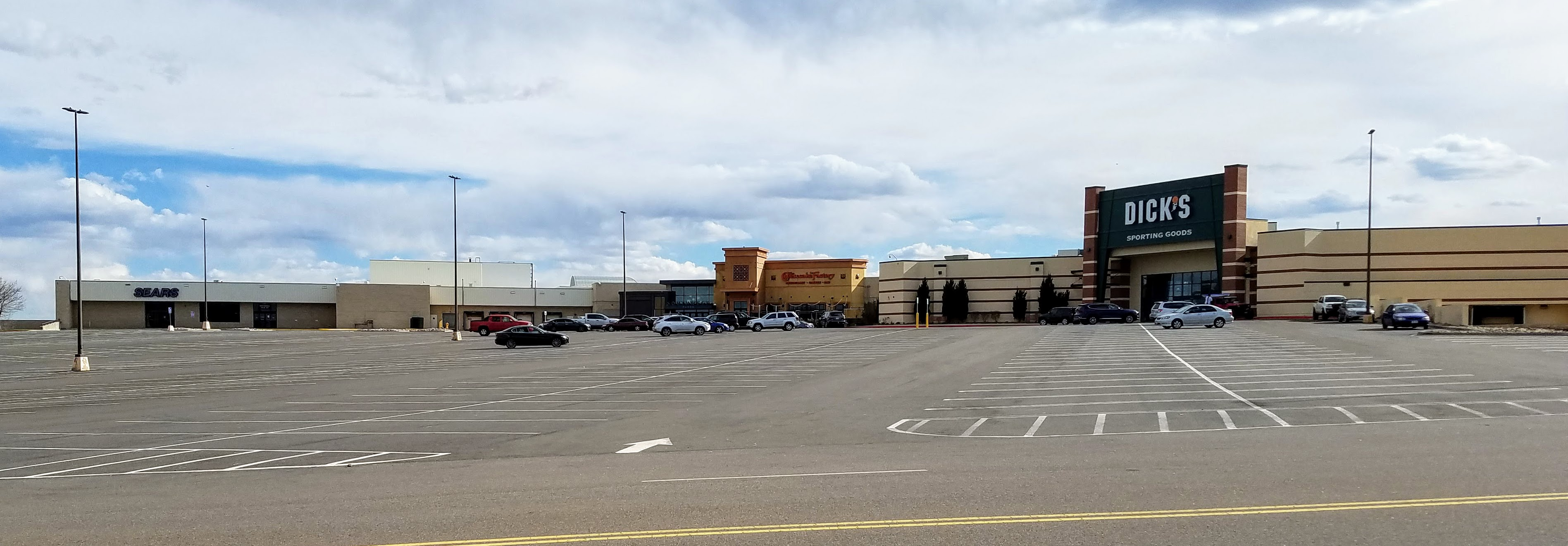
- Location: Jefferson County, Colorado
- Coordinates: 39°36′43″N 105°05′44″W
- Address: 8501 West Bowles Avenue; Littleton, Colorado 80123
- Opened: 1983; 43 years ago
- Developer: Southwest Properties Venture
- Manager: GGP
- Owner: GGP
- Num. of stores: 102
- Num. of anchor tenants: 6 (4 open, 1 vacant, 1 converted to fulfillment center)
- Floor area: 1,171,957 square feet (108,878.4 m^{2})
- Floors: 2
- Website: www.southwestplaza.com

Southwest Plaza is an enclosed shopping mall in unincorporated Jefferson County, Colorado, immediately south of Denver. Littleton, Colorado is commonly indicated in the mall's postal address because its ZIP code is primarily associated with that city, which lies some two miles east. The mall has two levels with over 150 stores and a food court.

The anchor stores are Dillard's, Dick's Sporting Goods, Round 1 Entertainment, and JCPenney. There are 2 additional anchor spaces, with one serving as a Macy's fulfillment center and a vacant anchor spot last occupied by Sears.

== History ==
In 1983, the mall opened with The Denver Dry Goods Company and anchor stores May-Daniels & Fisher (May D&F), Montgomery Ward, Sears, and Joslins.

In 1987, The May Department Stores Company, then owners of May D&F, acquired The Denver Dry Goods Company; since May Company already operated a May D&F store at the mall, the Denver Dry Goods store was sold to J. C. Penney.

In 1993, the May D&F store was converted to Houston-based Foley's.

In 1998, the mall was sold by Southwest Properties Venture, a partnership between Denver developers Jordon Perlmutter, Samuel Primack, and Michael Cooper to General Growth Properties for $64 million.

Joslins was converted to Dillard's in 1998.

Montgomery Ward closed in 2001 as the chain shuttered the last of its stores nationwide.

In 2006, the former Montgomery Ward store was demolished and re-built on a similar footprint as a Dillard's store and the former Dillard's being converted to a Dick's Sporting Goods and Steve & Barry's. In that same year, the Foley's store was converted to Macy's.

In 2009, Steve & Barry's closed as the entire chain was shut down.

In November 2015, an 18-month, $75 million renovation was completed. Also in November 2015, The Cheesecake Factory opened at the mall.

On August 6, 2019, it was announced that Sears will be closing this location as part of a plan to close 26 stores nationwide. The store closed in October 2019.

On October 15, 2020, Macy's parent company, Macy's, Inc., announced that they will convert the Dover Mall in Dover, Delaware and the Southwest Plaza Macy's stores into fulfillment centers, with in-store shopping discontinued at these two locations.

== Gallery ==
=== Southwest Plaza Parking Garage ===
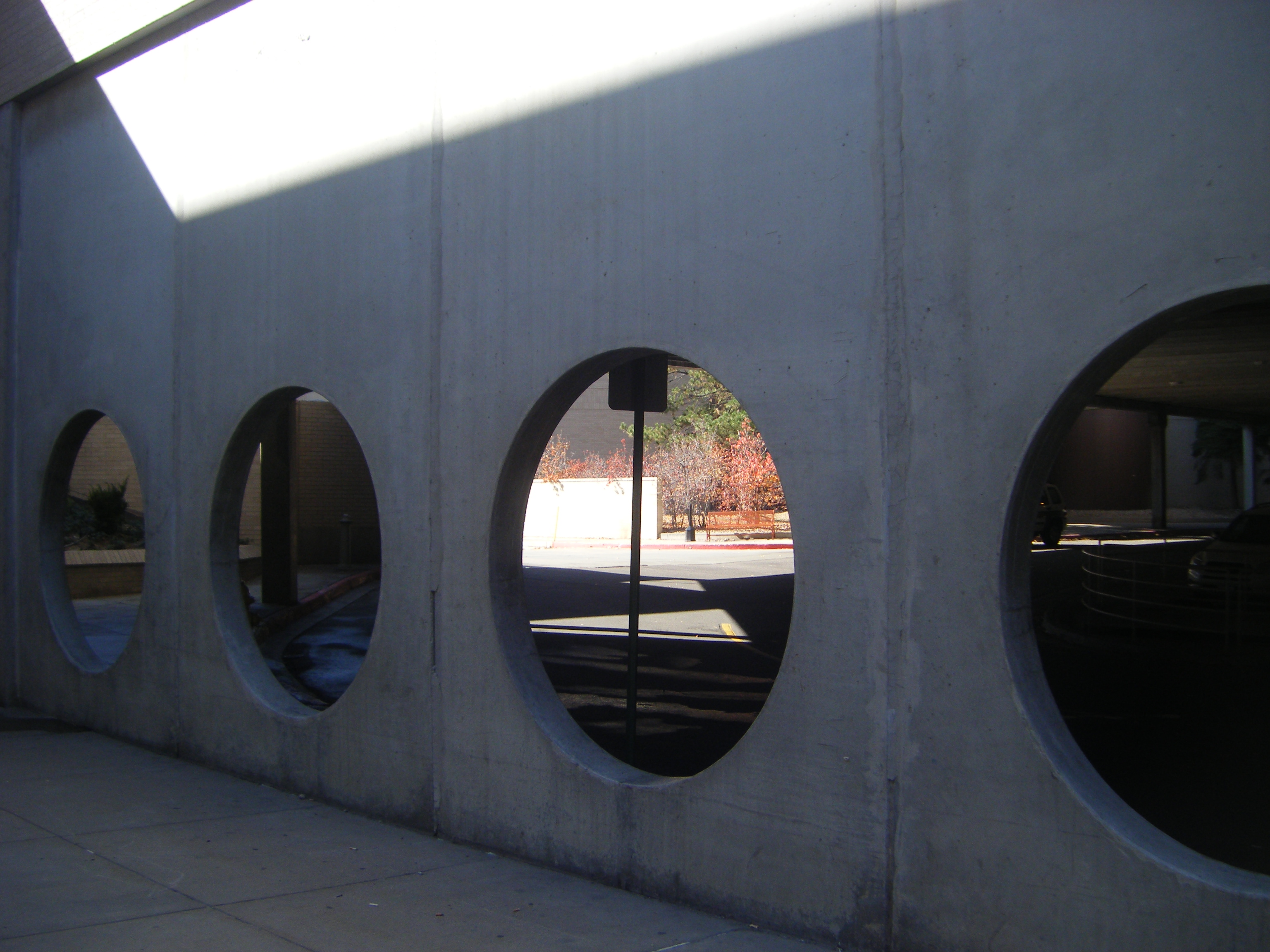
Vibe of the parking garage.

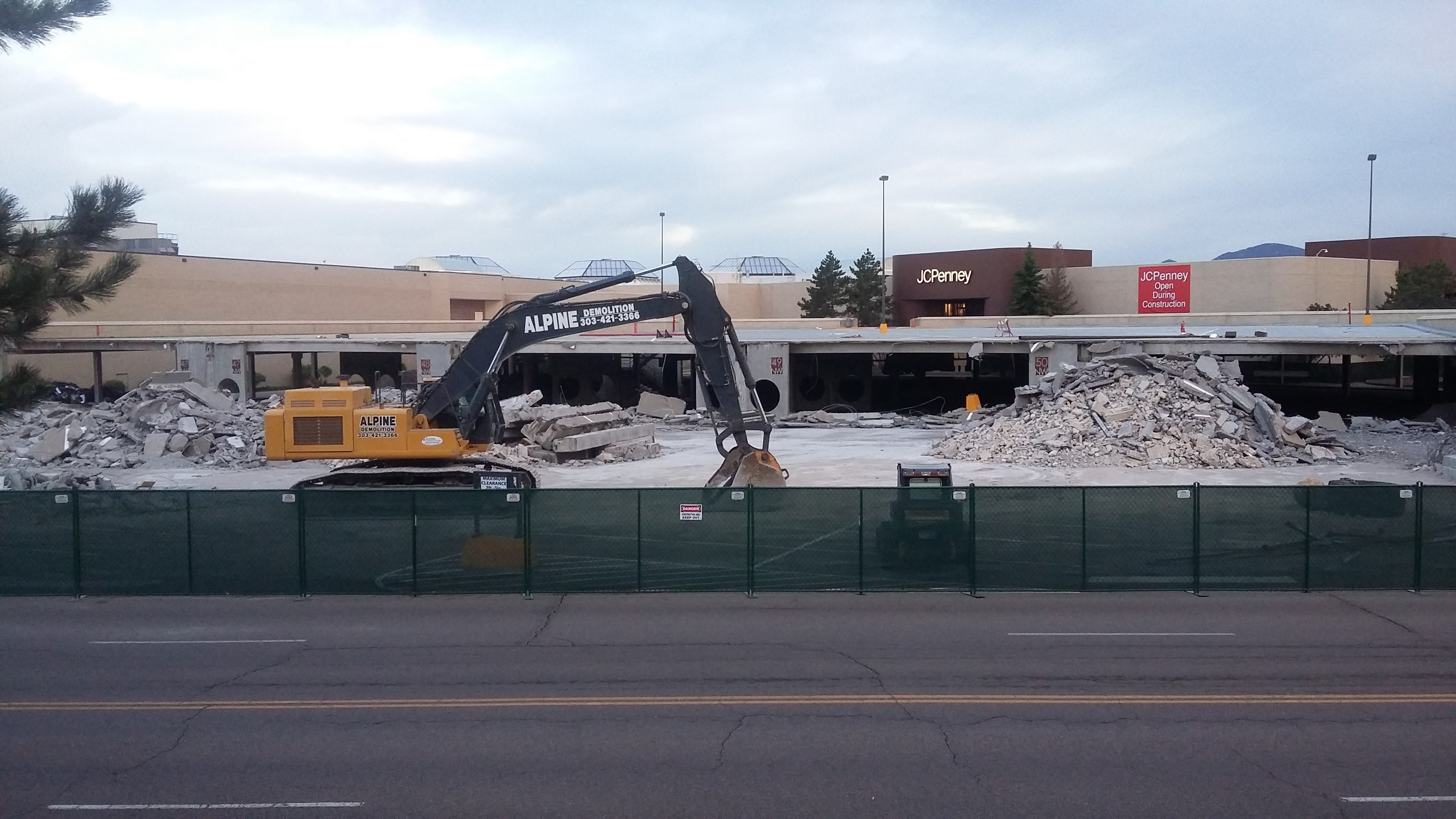
Parking Garage next to JCPenney and present-day Dick's Sporting Goods gets demolished

=== Steve & Barry's ===
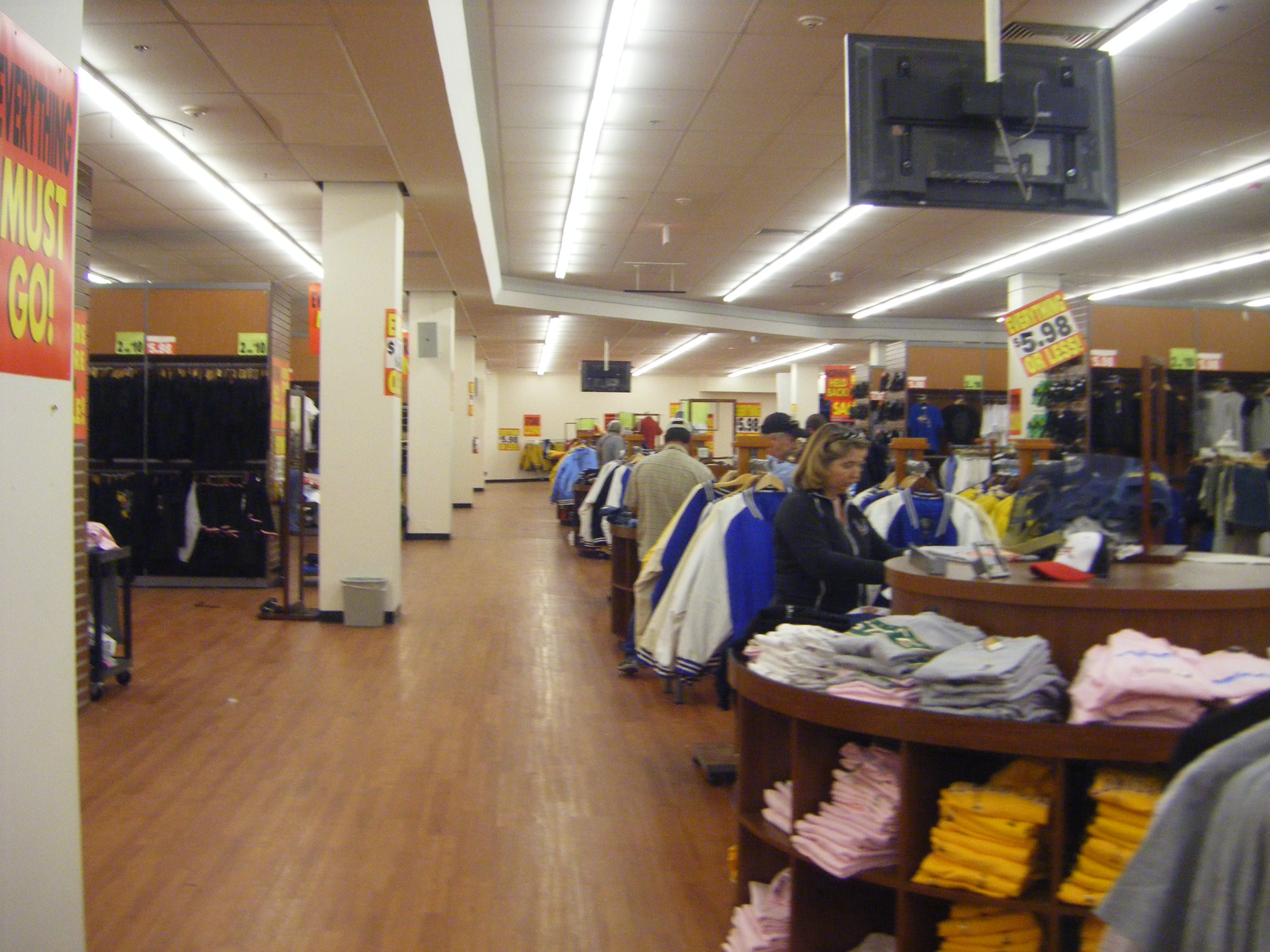
Steve and Barry's Closing Sale - Inside

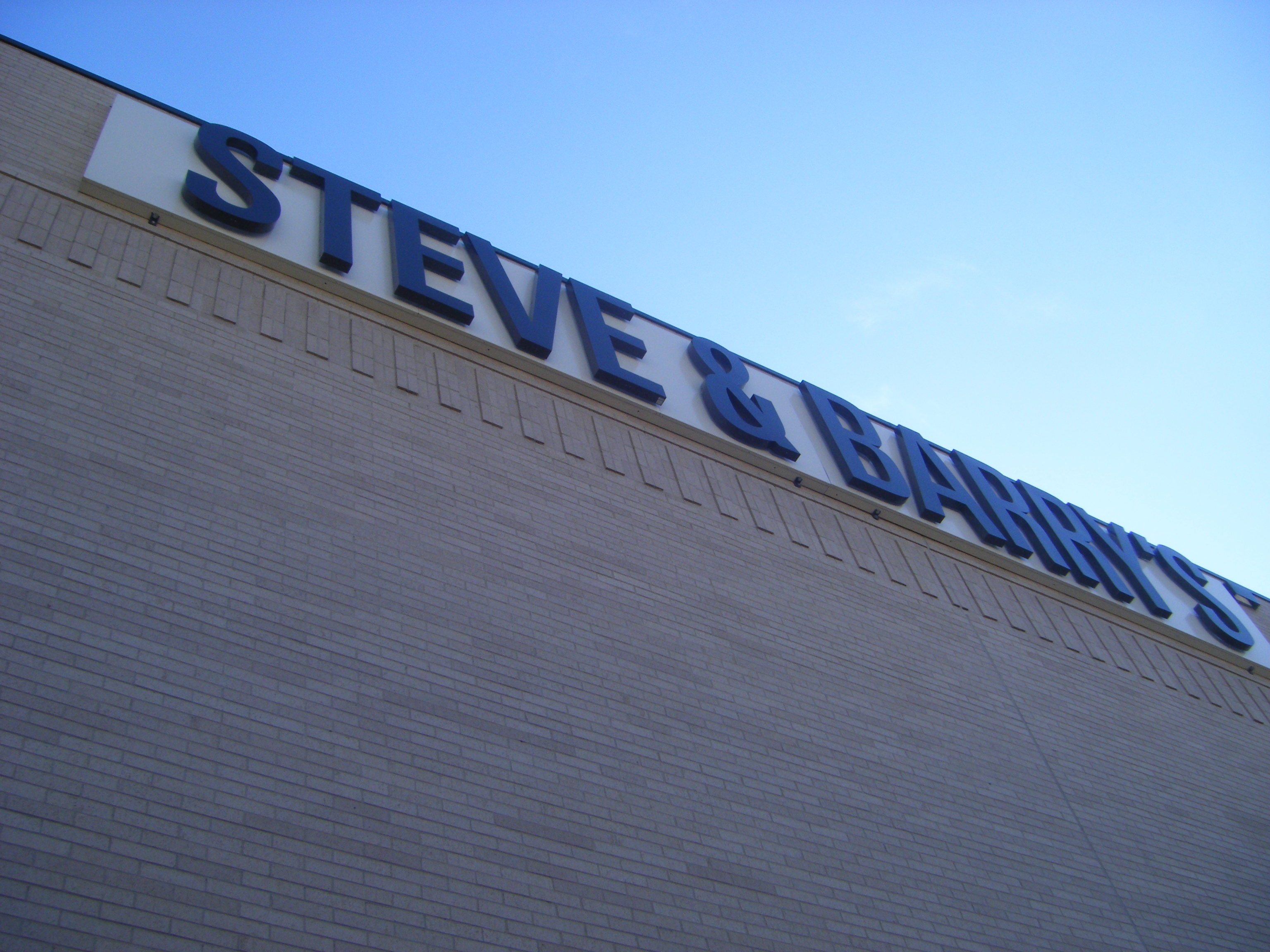
Steve and Barry's signage on outside of building

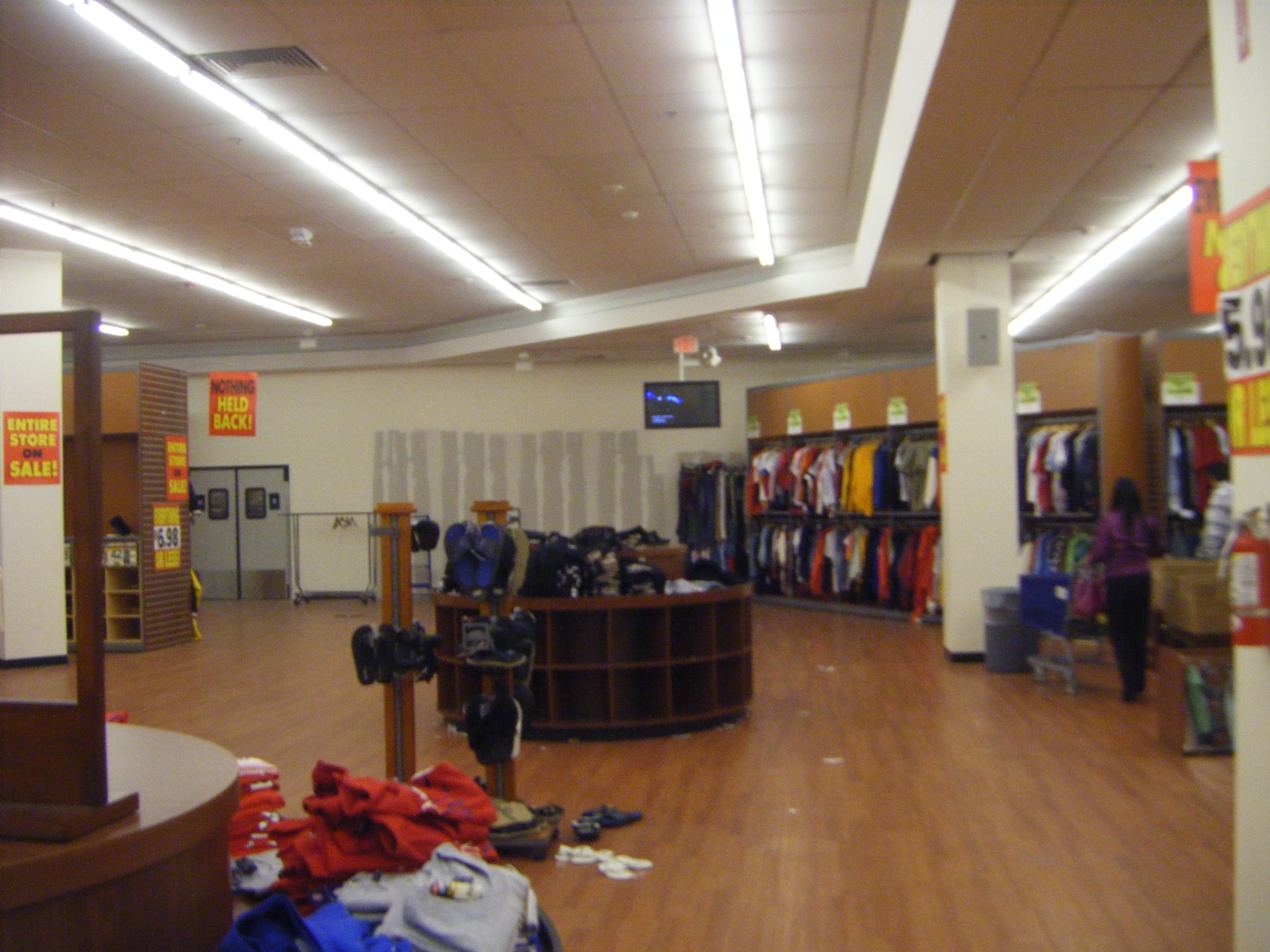
Steve and Barry's Closing Sale - Inside, Alternate Perspective

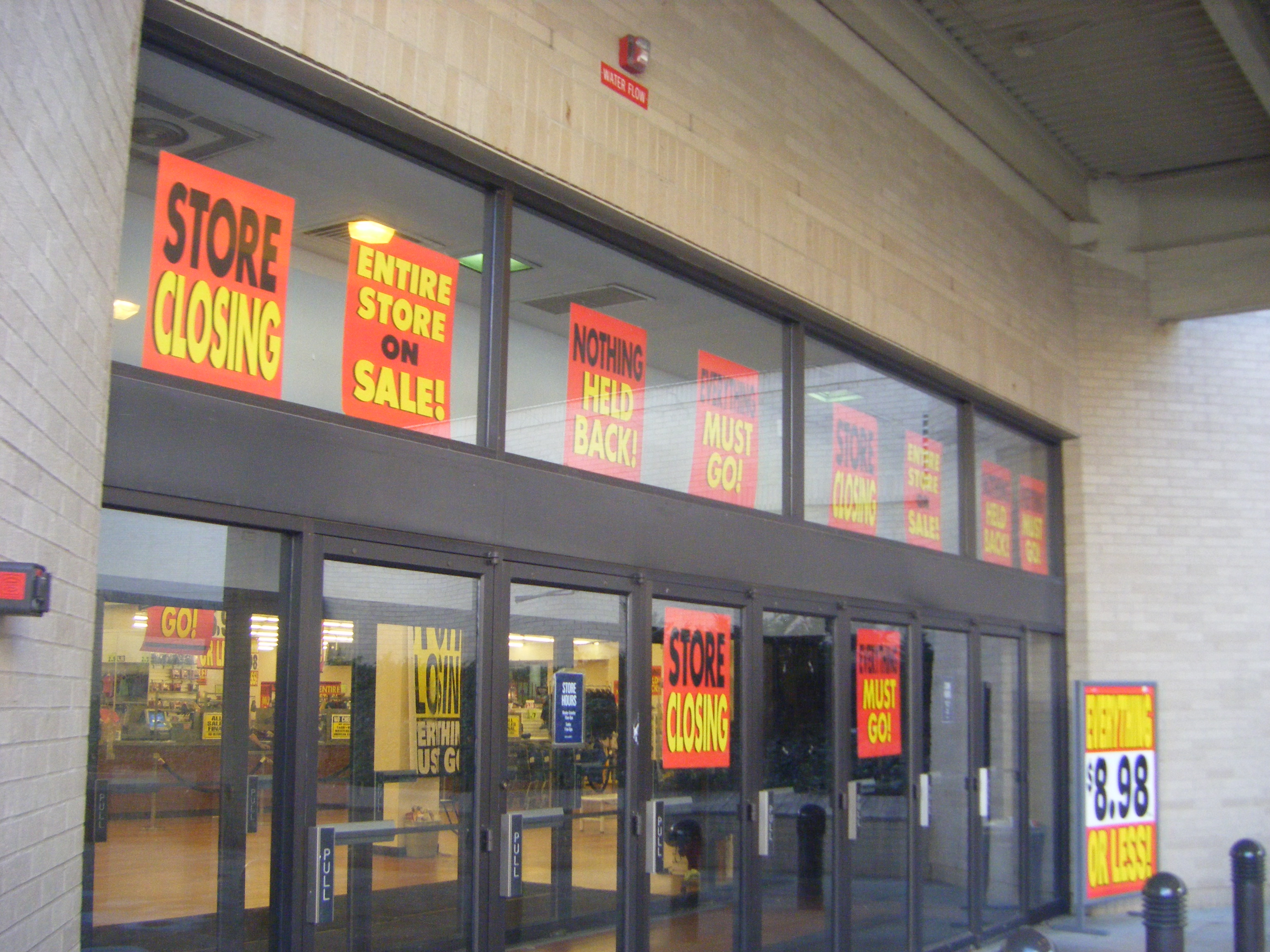
Store Closing Banners at one store entry

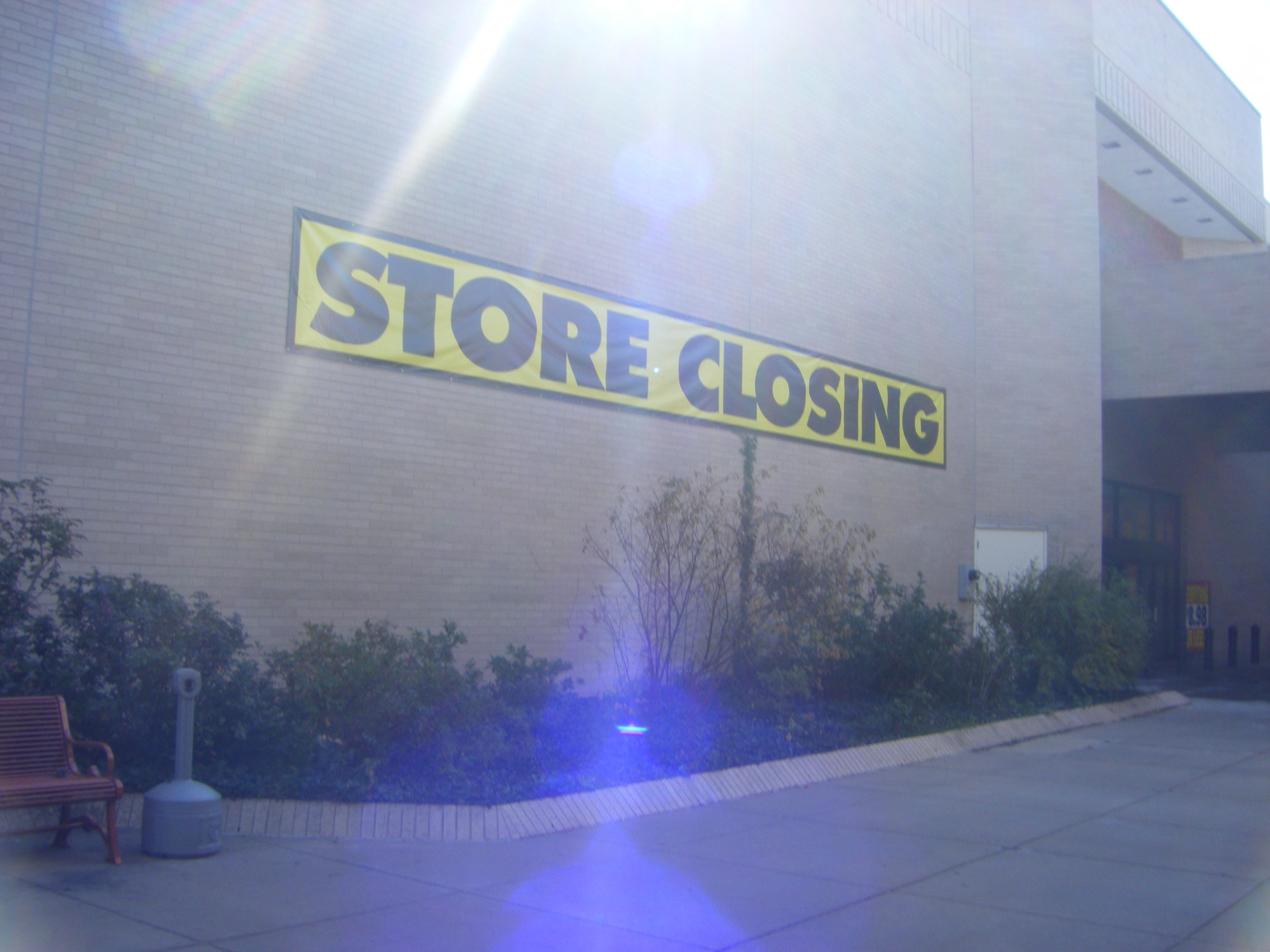
Huge "STORE CLOSING" banner near main entry
