= Freedom of religion in Uzbekistan =

The Constitution of Uzbekistan provides for freedom of religion and separation of church and state, although in practice this is not always the case. According to Human Rights Watch "authorities restrict religious freedom by preventing registration of religious communities, subjecting former religious prisoners to arbitrary controls, and prosecuting Muslims on broad and vaguely worded extremism-related charges." There is no restriction on mainstream religious practice by Muslims, Jews and Christians. Uzbek society is tolerant of Christian churches as long as they do not attempt to win converts among ethnic Uzbeks; the law prohibits or severely restricts proselytizing, importing and disseminating religious literature, and offering private religious instruction.

Using new criminal statutes enacted in 2006, criminal charges were brought against two pastors. One was sentenced to 4 years in a labor camp; the other received a suspended sentence and probation. The government has waged a campaign against Islamic groups suspected of extremism, sentencing members of these groups to lengthy jail terms. Many were suspected members of Hizb ut-Tahrir (HT), a banned extremist Islamic political movement, the banned Islamic group Akromiya (Akromiylar), or Wahhabi groups. A Pentecostal deacon was beaten after his church was featured in a documentary on state television against Christian evangelicals.

Since the election of Shavkat Mirziyoyev, Uzbekistan has enjoyed greater religious freedom and the country was removed from an American list of problematic countries for religious tolerance.

== Religious demography ==
The country has an area of 447,400 square kilometres (172,742 sq mi) and an estimated population of about 34 million. International experts believe the population has sustained a loss of 2 to 3 million in recent years due to the growing trend of labor migration from Uzbekistan to neighboring countries, Russia, South Korea, and the Middle East. Approximately 80 percent of the population is ethnic Uzbek; 5.5 percent Russian; 5 percent Tajik; 3 percent Kazakh; 2.5 percent Karakalpak; and 1.5 percent Tatar. There are no official statistics on membership in various religious groups; however, it is estimated that up to 90 percent of the population is nominally Sunni Muslim, of the Hanafi school. Shi'a Muslims, who are concentrated in the provinces of Bukhara and Samarkand, constitute an estimated 1 percent of the population. Approximately 5 percent of the population is Russian Orthodox, a percentage that declines as the number of ethnic Russians and other Slavs continue to emigrate. A growing number of Muslims and Russian Orthodox adherents actively practice their religion. Outside of Tashkent, practicing Muslims are now in the majority. During the period covered by this report, mosque attendance noticeably increased, particularly among younger men, who tend to constitute the majority of worshippers. The remaining 3 percent of the population includes small communities of Roman Catholics, Korean Christians, Baptists, Lutherans, Seventh-day Adventists, evangelical and Pentecostal Christians, Jehovah's Witnesses, Zoroastrians, Buddhists, Baháʼís, and Hare Krishnas, as well as atheists. In addition, an estimated 15,000 to 20,000 Ashkenazi and Bukharan Jews remain in the country, concentrated in the cities of Tashkent, Bukhara, and Samarkand. At least 80,000 others have emigrated to Israel and the United States over the past two decades.

== Status of religious freedom ==
=== Legal and policy framework ===
The Constitution provides for freedom of religion; however, the Government and laws restricted these rights in practice. The Constitution also establishes the principle of separation of church and state. The Government prohibits religious groups from forming political parties and social movements.

The Law on Freedom of Conscience and Religious Organizations (1998 Religion Law) provides for freedom of worship, freedom from religious persecution, separation of church and state, and the right to establish schools and train clergy; however, the law grants those rights only to registered groups. It also restricts religious rights that are judged to be in conflict with national security, prohibits proselytizing, bans religious subjects in public schools, prohibits the private teaching of religious principles, and requires religious groups to obtain a license to publish or distribute materials. The Committee on Religious Affairs (CRA), an agency accountable to the Cabinet of Ministers, must approve all religious literature.

The 1998 Religion Law requires all religious groups and congregations to register, and provides strict and burdensome criteria for their registration. Among its requirements, the law stipulates that each group must present a list of at least one hundred citizen members to the local branch of the Ministry of Justice (MOJ). This provision enables the Government to ban any group by finding technical grounds for denying its registration petition. The CRA oversees registered religious activity. New mosques continued to face difficulties gaining registration, as did those closed previously that reapplied.

The law prohibits religious groups from training religious personnel if they do not have a registered central administrative body. Registration of a central body requires registered religious groups in 8 of the country's 13 provinces, an impossible requirement for most religious groups. There are six such entities that may legally train religious personnel. The law limits religious instruction to officially sanctioned religious schools and state-approved instructors. The law permits no private instruction and provides for fines for violations. The law prohibits the teaching of religious subjects in public schools.

Article 14 of the Religion Law prohibits the wearing of "cult robes" (religious clothing) in public places by all except "those serving in religious organizations."

The Criminal and Civil Codes contain stiff penalties for violating the Religion Law and other statutes on religious activities. In addition to the prohibited activities that include organizing an illegal religious group, the law also proscribes persuading others to join such a group and drawing minors into a religious organization without the permission of their parents. Any religious service conducted by an unregistered religious organization is illegal.

The Criminal Code formally distinguishes between "illegal" groups, which are those that are not registered properly, and "prohibited" groups, such as the extremist Islamist political party Hizb ut-Tahrir (HT), Tabligh Jamoat, and other groups branded with the general term "Wahhabi" that are banned altogether. The code makes it a criminal offense, punishable by up to 5 years in prison, to organize an illegal religious group or to resume the activities of such a group after it has been denied registration or ordered to disband. In addition, the code punishes participation in such a group with up to 3 years in prison. The code also provides penalties of up to 20 years in prison (if the crime results in "grave consequences") for "organizing or participating" in the activities of religious extremist, fundamentalist, separatist, or other prohibited groups. In the past, courts often ignored the distinction between illegal and prohibited groups, and frequently convicted members of unapproved Muslim groups under both statutes. There were no reports of such practices during the reporting period.

The main laws under which authorities charge citizens for religious activity are article 159 (anti constitutional activity); article 216 (illegal establishment of public associations or religious organizations); article 216, section 2 (violation of legislation on religious organizations, including proselytism); article 244, section 1 (production and distribution of materials that create a threat to public security and public order); and article 244, section 2 (establishment, direction of, or participation in religious extremist, separatist, fundamentalist, or other banned organizations) of the Criminal Code. Citizens charged under these sections (particularly article 244, Section 2) are frequently charged with being members of HT.

December 2005 amendments to both the Criminal Code (article 217 Part 2) and Administrative Code (article 201) increased fines for repeated offenses of violations of the law on religious activity, raising them to 200 to 300 times the minimum monthly wage of $10 (12,420 soum) under the Criminal Code and 50 to 100 times the minimum wage under the Administrative Code.

June 2006 amendments to the Administrative Code punish "illegal production, storage, import or distribution of materials of religious content" with a fine of 20 to 100 times the minimum monthly wage for individuals, or 50 to 100 times the minimum monthly wage for officials of organizations, together with confiscation of the materials and the "corresponding means of producing and distributing them." Criminal Code article 244-3 addresses the same offense, punishing those already convicted under the corresponding article of the Administrative Code with a fine of 100 to 200 times the minimum monthly wage, or corrective labor of up to 3 years. Other changes introduced simultaneously to the Criminal and Administrative Codes punish the production and distribution of "literature promoting racial and religious hatred."

Although the law treats all registered religious denominations equally, the Government funds an Islamic university and the preservation of Islamic historic sites. In 2007, to mark Tashkent's designation as one of four Capitals of Islamic Culture by the Islamic Educational, Scientific and Cultural Organization (ISESCO), the Government funded a major expansion of the Muslim Board of Uzbekistan (Muftiate) offices and a large new mosque and library in the complex. The Government provided logistical support for 5,000 selected Muslims to participate in the Hajj, an increase from 4,200 the previous year, but the pilgrims paid their own expenses. The Government controls the Muftiate, which in turn controls the Islamic hierarchy, the content of imams' sermons, and the volume and substance of published Islamic materials. The Kurbon Hayit and Roza Hayit Islamic holy days are observed as national holidays.

The Government still did not implement any of the recommendations of a 2003 Organization for Security and Cooperation in Europe (OSCE) Office for Democratic Institutions and Human Rights (ODIHR) expert panel that reviewed the 1998 Religion Law and associated statutes and concluded that they were in violation of the international norms for religious freedom. The OSCE recommended lifting the bans on proselytizing and private religious instruction and decriminalizing activities of unregistered religious organizations.

=== Restrictions on religious freedom ===
There were significant governmental restrictions on religious freedom during the period covered by this report. The Government, by continuing to deny registration to some religious groups and by deregistering others, deprived them of their legal right to worship. The Government restricted many religious practices and activities, punishing some citizens because they engaged in religious practices in violation of the registration laws.

While somewhat supportive of moderate Muslims, the Government, citing national security concerns, bans Islamic organizations it deems extremist and criminalizes membership in them. Chief among the banned organizations are Hizb ut-Tahrir (HT), the Islamic Movement of Uzbekistan (IMU), Akromiya, Tabligh Jamoat, and various groups the Government broadly labeled Wahhabi. The Government states that it does not consider repression of persons or groups suspected of extremism to be a matter of religious freedom, but rather of preventing armed resistance to the Government.

HT is an extremist Islamist political organization that promotes hate and praises acts of terrorism, while maintaining that it is committed to nonviolence. The party's virulently anti-Semitic and anti-Western literature and websites call for the overthrow of secular governments, including those in Central Asia, to be replaced with a worldwide Islamic government referred to as the Caliphate. Because HT is primarily a political organization, albeit one motivated by religious ideology, and because it does not condemn terrorist acts by other groups, authorities' actions to restrict HT and prosecute its members are not a restriction on religious freedom per se. Nor are restrictions on the IMU, a group of Namangan origin on the U.S. list of international terrorist organizations and believed to be responsible for a series of fatal bombings in the country in 1999 and 2004. Religious freedom concerns arise when innocent persons are accused of membership in these groups based solely on their religious beliefs or practice and convicted without due process.

The Government has repressed and prosecuted members of Akromiya (Akromiylar) since 1997. Religious experts claim that Akromiya is an informal association that promotes business along Islamic religious principles, while the Government claims that the group is a branch of HT and that it attempted, together with the IMU, to overthrow the Government through armed rebellion in Andijon in May 2005.

Tabligh Jamoat is an Islamic missionary group with origins in South Asia whose worship, dress, and grooming practices are based on practices from the time of Muhammad; its members claim to be exclusively religious and apolitical.

Other banned groups include alleged "Wahhabists," a term used loosely in the country for any conservative Muslims. In particular the Government uses "Wahhabist" to describe Muslims who worship outside state-approved institutions, who were educated at madrasas abroad, or those followers of either Imam Abduvali Mirzaev of Andijon, who disappeared in 1995, or Imam Abidkhan Nazarov of Tashkent, who fled to Kazakhstan in 1998 to avoid arrest and was granted refugee status by the United Nations High Commissioner for Refugees on March 15, 2006.

In previous reporting periods, sources claimed that authorities required imams of registered mosques to submit lists of individuals in their congregations who may have extremist tendencies. There were no such reports in this reporting period, but there were reports that the Government instructed some mahalla (neighborhood) committees and imams to identify local residents who could potentially become involved in extremist activity or groups, including those who prayed daily or otherwise demonstrated active devotion. The Government controls the content of imams' sermons and the volume and substance of published Islamic materials.

The Government's harsh treatment of suspected religious extremists has discouraged many religious believers from showing outward expressions of religious piety. Following the May 2005 violence in Andijon, authorities arrested many Andijon-area residents on charges of religious extremism. In this reporting period, there were also credible accounts of mahalla committee chairmen actively discouraging residents from worshipping in mosques. Forum 18 News Service also reported in November 2006 that authorities distributed instructions to imams about the undesirability of children attending mosques and that police on occasion prevented children from attending Friday prayers.

Many sources reported that the atmosphere in the Muslim community has since improved, however, with many mosques overflowing into the streets for lack of space during Friday prayer. The Government has loosened its grip on observant Muslims, allowing individuals to practice their faith within a controlled environment. Nevertheless, there were accounts of law enforcement and national security officers actively monitoring and reporting on mosque activities and those of worshippers. There were also reports that local officials in Tashkent conducted a series of meetings with mahalla leaders to discourage Islamist tendencies. At these meetings officials allegedly called on families to discourage their sons from attending mosque and their daughters from wearing the hijab and also instructed neighborhood leaders to discourage the performance of traditional Islamic wedding ceremonies. The Government limited the number of Hajj pilgrims to 5,000, or approximately 20 percent of the country's total possible number of pilgrims (estimated at approximately 25,000 pilgrims or 1,000 pilgrims for every 1 million of population). Potential pilgrims were reportedly approved by local Mahalla committees, district administrations, the National Security Service, and the state-run Hajj Commission.

Many in the Government expressed suspicion of the Jehovah's Witnesses, viewing it as an extremist group. Internal police training documents continue to list the Jehovah's Witnesses, along with the IMU and HT, as security threats. Local officials and representatives of the religious establishment continued to express apprehension about the group's missionary activities. On November 30 and December 1, 2006, state television broadcast a documentary entitled "Hypocrisy" that linked Jehovah's Witnesses with the Japanese cult Aum Shinrikyo.

Some mosques continued to have difficulty registering. Forum 18 reported in 2003 that the Panjera Mosque in Namangan, where approximately 500 persons used to meet for prayer on feast days, was closed by authorities in 1998 and tried unsuccessfully for several years to register. Several mosques in the southern and eastern Ferghana Valley, which had reported similar registration problems in past years, remained unregistered despite having the required number of congregants to register. Worshipers of the locally funded Tuman Mosque in Akhunbabayev District of Ferghana continued to function after court-enforced registration in early 2004. A small number of unofficial, independent mosques are allowed to operate quietly under the watch of official imams.

The Jehovah's Witnesses applied for registration at local, regional, and national levels and either received a denial or no official answer during the period covered by this report. Other churches remained unregistered after unsuccessful efforts in past years to register. These included Bethany Baptist Church in the Mirzo-Ulugbek District of Tashkent, the Pentecostal Church in Chirchik, Greater Grace Christian Church in Samarkand, and Emmanuel Church of Nukus, Karakalpakstan. Despite a number of international appeals and formal legal appeals in past reporting periods, the Mir (Peace) Church of Nukus, the Hushkhabar Church in Guliston, the Pentecostal Church in Andijon, and the Baptist Church in Gazalkent also remained unregistered.

Approximately 20 Protestant churches previously operated in Karakalpakstan; however, it was unknown how many of these were still active. No Baptist church has successfully registered since 1999. Out of the 11 Jehovah's Witnesses groups in the country, only 1, in Chirchik, was registered at the end of the reporting period. On August 24, 2006, the Government canceled the registration status of the Jehovah's Witnesses' Ferghana congregation, citing several violations of the Religion Law, including proselytizing, inciting religious enmity, and holding meetings in a private home. The Jehovah's Witnesses appealed the decision, but remained unregistered at the end of the reporting period.

As of May 1, 2007, the Government had registered 2,227 religious congregations and organizations—an increase of 3 from 2,224 recorded in July 2006. Mosques, Muslim educational institutions, and Islamic centers comprised 2,046 of the total registered, an increase of 4. Among the Muslim groups were several Shi'a congregations. The number of registered Christian groups decreased by 1. The 181 registered minority religious groups included 58 Korean Christian, 36 Russian Orthodox, 23 Baptist, 21 Pentecostal ("Full Gospel"), 10 Seventh-day Adventist, 8 Jewish, 5 Roman Catholic, 6 Baháʼí, 3 Lutheran, 4 "New Apostolic," 2 Armenian Apostolic, 1 Jehovah's Witnesses, 1 Krishna Consciousness group, 1 Temple of Buddha, and 1 Christian "Voice of God" Church.

During the reporting period, some churches, particularly evangelical churches with ethnic Uzbek members, did not apply for registration because they did not expect local officials to register them. Other groups, including those with too few members, reported that they preferred not to bring themselves to the attention of authorities by submitting a registration application that obviously would not meet legal requirements. Some groups also did not want to give the authorities a list of their members, especially ethnic Uzbeks, as they were harassed during previous attempts to register. A few groups refused on principle to seek registration because they challenge the Government's right to require registration.

To register, groups also must report in their charter a valid legal address. In this reporting period, local officials denied approval of legal addresses or did not answer such requests, thus preventing religious groups from registering. The MOJ also cited this requirement in explaining local officials' decisions. On May 11, 2007, the Sergely district administration in Tashkent denied approval of a legal address for Tashkent's Jehovah's Witnesses congregation. Over the course of this reporting period, Jehovah's Witnesses in Samarkand, Kagan (Bukhara Province), Jizzak and Angren also requested approval of legal addresses but received no response. On August 24, 2006, the Ferghana provincial Justice Department deregistered the Jehovah's Witnesses congregation partly for failing to register a change in their legal address. The Ferghana congregation explained to the authorities that they had purchased a new house and were in the process of registering the new address when their registration was revoked. Members of the congregation were also accused of proselytizing. On June 12, 2007, the Ferghana congregation again requested approval of a legal address, but their request was denied. Some groups, such as the Tashkent International Church, were reluctant to purchase property without assurance that their registration would be approved. Others claimed that local officials arbitrarily withhold approval of the addresses because they oppose the existence of Christian churches with ethnic Uzbek members.

Other problems preventing registration in the past included claims of falsified congregation lists; problems certifying addresses; improper certification by fire inspectors, sanitation workers, and epidemiologists; grammatical errors in the Uzbek text of a group's charter; and other technicalities.

The International Church of Tashkent, a Protestant nondenominational church that ministers exclusively to Tashkent's international community, cannot qualify for registration, as it does not meet the legal requirement of 100 citizen members. It holds services regularly, without obstruction, in an officially registered Baptist church.

Local authorities continued to pressure Baptist churches associated with the International Council of Churches of Evangelical Christians/Baptists, a denomination that rejects registration on principle, with demands to register their congregations.

Due to the Government's policy against proselytizing, ethnic Russians, Jews, and non-Muslim foreigners enjoy greater religious freedom to choose and change their religion than Muslim ethnic groups, particularly ethnic Uzbeks. Most Christian churches can operate freely as long as they do not attempt to win converts among ethnic Uzbeks. Ethnic Uzbek Christians are often secretive about their faith and sometimes do not attempt to register their organizations due to fear of restrictive reprisals, such as observing to see if they are meeting without benefit of registration, which would lead to arrest under criminal charges. Christian congregations of mixed ethnic background often face difficulties, including rejection of registration or delays in response, or are reluctant to list their ethnic Uzbek members on registration lists for fear of incurring harassment by local officials.

The private teaching of religious principles and the teaching of religion to minors without parental consent is illegal. Only religious groups with a registered central office may legally provide religious instruction.

There are 11 madrasas (including 2 for women), which provide secondary education including a full range of secular subjects. In addition, the Islamic Institute and Islamic University in Tashkent provide higher educational instruction. The Cabinet of Ministers considers diplomas granted by madrasas equivalent to other diplomas, thus enabling graduates of those institutions to continue their education at the university level. The curriculum in the madrasas and Islamic Institute is oriented towards those planning to become imams or religious teachers. This is not the case with the government-funded and established Islamic University, where students pursue religious studies from a secular perspective. While study at the Islamic University does not qualify graduates to practice as imams, some graduates of the university have been appointed imams after pursuing a standard sequence of study at a madrasa.

Apart from full-time study in these institutions, there is no officially sanctioned religious instruction for individuals interested in learning about Islam. An increasing number of imams informally offer religious education; although this is technically illegal, local authorities rarely took legal action. Two madrasas in the populous and observantly Muslim Ferghana Valley remained closed after the Government converted them to medical facilities.

The Government restricts Shi'a Islamic education by not permitting the separate training of Shi'a imams inside the country and not recognizing such education received outside the country. However, Shi'a imams are educated in Sunni madrasas, which offer some courses in Shi'a jurisprudence. The Russian Orthodox Church operates two monasteries (one for women, one for men) and a seminary and offers Sunday school education through many of its churches. Other religious groups offer religious education through their religious centers. The Jewish community has no rabbinate because it does not have synagogues in eight different provinces and therefore cannot meet the requirements for a registered central office; however, the Jewish school in Tashkent's Yakkasaroy District provides instruction on Jewish culture.

The MOJ controls accreditation, a necessity for anyone attempting to work for a non-governmental organization (NGO) in the country, and has the ability to force out, without bringing formal charges, those it believes are proselytizing. The 1998 Religion Law forbids missionary work of any kind.

Several international faith-based organizations were forced to close in 2006 and 2007 as part of a wave of closures of international NGOs. On September 6, 2006, the Tashkent City Court liquidated the Uzbek branch of the U.S.-based NGO Partnership in Academics and Development (PAD) after accusing its expatriate staff of proselytizing. On August 23, 2006, the Tashkent City Court ordered the closure of the local branch of the U.S.-based charity Crosslink Development International after the Ministry of Justice accused its employees of conducting missionary activities among Muslims and Orthodox believers. The American-Jewish Joint Distribution Committee faced administrative difficulties in registering local partner organizations because of their connection with a faith-based entity. A 2003 decree of the Cabinet of Ministers outlining a change in registration requirements for NGOs restricted the activities of faith-based entities.

In June 2006 the Government forced the closure of the international NGOs Central Asia Free Exchange (CAFE) and Global Involvement Through Education, after employees of the organizations were accused of engaging in proselytism, and authorities accused both organizations of several other violations of law. Both organizations maintained that their activities were strictly of a humanitarian nature.

Government employees generally display less religious devotion than do citizens in the private sector. The state maintains a policy of secularism, and government employees are under greater scrutiny than others to maintain the separation between religion and state structures.

Unlike previous years, there were no credible reports of heads of mahalla committees threatening Christian converts that they would not be given a cemetery burial if they did not stop attending church.

State-controlled media in some cases encouraged societal prejudice against evangelical Christians. On November 30 and December 1, 2006, state television broadcast a documentary entitled "Hypocrisy" that warned citizens against associating with evangelical Christians, particularly Pentecostals. The television program was followed by a series of articles in the state-controlled press and Internet sites reinforcing this message.

Although the Government requires that the CRA approve all religious literature, in practice a number of other government entities, including the Ministry of Internal Affairs (MVD), National Security Service (NSS), Customs Service, and police may suppress or confiscate religious literature of which they do not approve. The CRA has restricted the right to publish, import, and distribute religious literature solely to registered central offices of religious organizations, of which seven now exist: an interdenominational Bible Society; the Muslim Board of Uzbekistan; two Islamic centers; and Russian Orthodox, Full Gospel, Baptist, and Roman Catholic offices.

In this reporting period, the Government restricted the quantity of Christian literature in the Uzbek language that registered central religious organizations could import into the country. Authorities also confiscated Christian literature in Uzbek that had been legally imported into the country. In previous reporting periods, government authorities told church leaders that all Christian literature in Uzbek is considered contraband, even if it was legally imported. For historical and cultural reasons, evangelical pastors generally preach in Russian while offering limited services in the Uzbek language—the official national language and the one linked most closely to the majority Muslim population. In this reporting period, the CRA allowed some materials, such as limited quantities of Uzbek translations of some books of the Bible. The Government requires the Bible Society to file regular reports on its printing, importing, and translating activities.

The Government may confiscate and in some cases destroy illegally imported religious literature. In July 2006 the Customs Service detained a shipment of 500 Russian-language Bibles and other literature that had been shipped to the Jehovah's Witnesses congregation in Chirchik, based on the CRA's finding that the literature was not necessary. The literature was impounded through the end of the reporting period and subject to storage charges payable by the Jehovah's Witnesses, despite a request from the organization to reroute the shipment to Kazakhstan. Authorities sometimes burn literature, including Bibles that have been confiscated from members of unregistered religious communities. Forum 18 News Agency reported that following a raid on a Baptist church in Karshi on August 27, 2006, a court ordered the burning of seized Christian literature, including a Bible, hymnbooks, and multiple copies of the Old Testament Book of Proverbs in Uzbek.

The International Post Office in Tashkent scrutinizes all incoming packages and sends examples of any religious material to the CRA for further examination and approval. In the event that the CRA bans the materials, it mails a letter to the intended recipient and the sender explaining the rejection by the committee. The CRA has denied entry into Uzbekistan of both Christian and Muslim titles.

The Government tightly controls access to Muslim publications and requires a statement in every domestic publication (books, pamphlets, CDs, and movies) indicating the source of its publication authority. Many books are published with the phrase "permission for this book was granted by the CRA" or "this book is recommended by the CRA," thus indicating official sanction. Generally, only books published under the Muslim Board's imprint "Movarounnahr" contain these phrases. Other works published under the imprint of the state-owned Sharq or Adolat Publishing Houses do not appear to require CRA approval, even when they deal with Islamic law. A few works in Arabic, imported from abroad, are sometimes available from book dealers. More controversial literature, if available, is not displayed, but available only upon request. Possession of literature by authors deemed to be extremists, or of any illegally imported or produced literature, may lead to arrest and prosecution. The Government categorically prohibits HT leaflets.

=== Abuses of religious freedom ===
The government continued to commit serious abuses of religious freedom. The government's campaign against extremist Muslim groups resulted in numerous serious human rights abuses during the period covered by this report. The campaign was largely directed at suspected IMU members or other terrorists, as well as suspected HT members. This ongoing campaign has resulted in the arrest of many observant, non-extremist Muslims, as well as allegations, dozens of them confirmed, that law enforcement officials have physically mistreated or tortured hundreds, perhaps thousands over the years.

Authorities often severely mistreat persons arrested on suspicion of extremism, using torture, beatings, and particularly harsh prison conditions, typically sentencing these individuals to 7- to 12-year terms. Some defendants, particularly those also accused of terrorist activity, received sentences of up to 20 years. Even slight involvement with HT, such as attending a Qu'ran study session or possessing an HT leaflet, can draw a sentence of several years' imprisonment.

There were no further developments in the September 2005 death of Islamic cleric Shavkat Madumarov, who died in custody three days after he was sentenced to 7 years' imprisonment for membership in a banned Islamic group. Although specific information was difficult to obtain, human rights and other observers maintained that prisoners frequently die of diseases such as tuberculosis, contracted during their confinement.

In 2004 the Supreme Court issued a decree definitively banning the use of evidence obtained by torture or other illegal means. The government has since taken limited administrative steps to eliminate torture in detention, but there were numerous reports that such treatment remained routine and systematic.

There were no developments in the April 19, 2006, conviction of eight men from the town of Yangiyul, Tashkent Province, on charges of membership in an unregistered religious organization, following a trial at which the defendants testified they had been beaten and tortured. There were also no new developments in the case of nine persons convicted in April 2005 and sentenced to prison terms of 6 to 13 years on religious extremism charges, amid allegations that law enforcement officials tortured them to provoke confessions.

There were no new developments in the following cases: the February 2005 conviction of 2 Sufi Muslims who claimed that authorities planted HT leaflets on them and tortured them, 23 alleged extremists whose October 2004 convictions were based on testimony police obtained through torture, or the October 2004 criminal conviction of the imam of a Karshi mosque (erroneously cited in the 2005 and 2006 reports as a Navoi mosque) and 16 members who admitted only to being adherents of Islam.

The Government's anti-extremism campaign targeted followers of former Tashkent Imam Abidkhan Nazarov, nine of whose followers were deported from Kazakhstan in late November 2005. Uzbekistan courts tried, convicted, and sentenced 7 of them to an average of 6 years' imprisonment on charges of Islamic extremism. Authorities committed the eighth, Shoirmat Shorakhmetov, to an institution for the criminally insane. The ninth, former Tashkent Imam Rukhitdin Fakhrutdinov, was sentenced on September 6, 2006, to 17 years in prison on charges of extremism and involvement in the 1999 Tashkent car bombings. Court guards barred trial monitors from the proceedings. There were no developments in the May 2004 disappearance of Imam Nazarov's eldest son, Husnuddin Nazarov.

In thousands of cases in previous reporting periods, authorities asserted HT membership based solely on outward expressions of devout belief or have made false assertions of HT membership as a pretext for prosecuting those of moderate religious belief. In this reporting period, authorities targeted individuals whose relatives were already in prison on charges of extremism or have served as witnesses in other trials. Estimates from credible sources in previous reporting periods suggested that as many as 4,500 of the estimated 5,000 to 5,500 political prisoners being held in detention were imprisoned based on alleged HT membership.

During the reporting period, at least 77 persons, and possibly many more, were convicted of membership in HT. In many of these cases there were allegations of torture and coercion or of targeting individuals whose family members were in jail or who had testified as defense witnesses at other HT trials. The circumstances of the other convictions were unclear, as observers were not able to attend many of the trials.

On April 18, 2007, the Tashkent City Criminal Court convicted Gulnora Valijonova of HT membership and sentenced her to 6 years' imprisonment. According to Human Rights Watch and an independent human rights activist, who monitored the trial, the Government failed to provide persuasive proof of her membership in HT and it appeared that she was targeted because several members of her family were in prison on extremist charges.

On October 25, 2006, the Samarkand Province Criminal Court convicted eight men of HT membership and sentenced three defendants to between 5 and 8 years' imprisonment; the remaining defendants were given suspended sentences. Several defendants alleged that their testimony had been coerced under torture, and the trial verdict noted the torture allegations. On September 22, 2006, in a trial closed to journalists and human rights activists, the Tashkent City Court convicted seven men of HT membership and sentenced them to between 10 and 13 years' imprisonment. Although the men confessed to the charges, their lawyers claimed that they confessed only after being threatened by the authorities. On August 3 and August 11, 2006, courts in Tashkent Province convicted a total of 29 men of HT membership in two separate trials and sentenced them to between 1 and 13 years in prison. Several defendants in the two trials testified that their confessions had been coerced through severe beatings. On August 10, 2006, the Tashkent City Criminal Court convicted 5 men of HT membership and sentenced them to between 12 and 15 years' imprisonment. The five defendants alleged in open court that they had been tortured, but the allegations were not investigated by the court. Relatives of the five men also told human rights activists that they were threatened by authorities and ordered not to talk about the case.

The 6 Andijon women who were arrested on April 20, 2006 and charged with possession and dissemination of HT materials were convicted on August 14, 2006 under the Criminal Code and sentenced each to between 5 and 6 years' imprisonment.

It was difficult to estimate precisely the number of persons arrested on false charges of extremism and difficult to know how many of those were under suspicion because of their religious observance. In previous reporting periods, there were accounts of authorities arbitrarily arresting a large percentage of those taken into custody on charges of extremism. Authorities appeared to suspect individuals belonging to Muslim organizations and Muslims who meet privately to pray or study Islam of extremism.

Persons accused of "Wahhabism" faced abuse ranging from job loss to physical abuse and long imprisonment. During the reporting period, at least 25 defendants were convicted on nonspecific charges of affiliation with "Wahhabi" groups in nine separate trials in Tashkent City and Tashkent Province alone. In April 2007, 6 men in Surkhandarya Province were convicted belonging to a Wahhabist sect and sentenced to between 3 and 6 years' imprisonment. According to a reliable source, the confessions of the defendants were extracted through torture. On February 14, 2007, the Tashkent City Criminal Court convicted two women on charges of "Wahhabism" and subjected them to fines. On December 19, 2006, the Tashkent City Criminal Court convicted Shoakmal Nosirov and Farkhod Muminov of belonging to a Wahhabist sect and sentenced them to between 6 and 9 years' imprisonment. The men were arrested after organizing a camp for 50 children that included Qur'an reading contests. Most of the children's fathers were in prison on religious extremist charges. In a separate trial on September 12, 2006, the Tashkent City Criminal Court convicted nine defendants and sentenced 8 of them to 6 years' imprisonment; the ninth defendant received a sentence of 8 years.

The Government continued to prosecute persons suspected of involvement in the Islamic group Akromiya. According to religious experts, Akromiya is a religious movement that promotes business, not extremism. On February 28, 2007, the Tashkent Province Criminal Court convicted Abdumalik Ibragimov of membership in Akromiya and sentenced him to 8 years' imprisonment. On July 21, 2006, the Tashkent City Criminal Court convicted at least eight, and possibly as many as 45 men, as a group on charges of Akromiya membership. Abdusamat Karimov was sentenced to 8 years' imprisonment. Ilkhomjon Yuldoshev was sentenced to 5 years' imprisonment. The sentences of the other defendants were not reported.

During the reporting period, authorities for the first time sentenced a Christian pastor on criminal charges for religious activities. On January 21, 2007, Andijon authorities arrested pastor Dmitry Shestakov, leader of a registered Full Gospel Pentecostal congregation. On March 9, 2007, the Andijon Province Criminal Court convicted Shestakov and sentenced him to 4 years in a labor colony on charges of organizing an illegal religious group, inciting religious hatred, and distributing religious extremist literature. After a new trial on May 25, 2007, Shestakov was transferred from an open work camp to a harsher labor camp in Navoi.

There were no developments in the case of alleged Akromiya members Akhad Ziyodkhojayev, Bokhodir Karimov, and Abdubosid Zakirov, convicted in Tashkent on July 25, 2005, of participation in a religious extremist group, along with other charges, and serving sentences of 15.5 to 16 years' imprisonment. There were also no new developments in the case of seven food vendors sentenced in March 2005 in Syrdarya to 8 to 9 years based on their alleged membership in Akromiya.

The Government branded the Islamic missionary group Tabligh Jamoat ("Outreach Society") as extremist. Eleven Tabligh Jamoat members sentenced in October 2004 in Andijon to 5-year terms remained incarcerated; most of the more recent cases resulted in fines, amnesties or light sentences.

In this reporting period, sources noted that some prisoners convicted of religious extremism were held separately from "ordinary" prisoners and were treated more harshly by prison guards. Shortly before their expected release, such prisoners also were retried for organizing extremist cells within prison and had their prison terms extended. In previous reporting periods, there were reports that prison authorities did not allow many prisoners suspected of Islamic extremism to practice their religion freely and, in some circumstances, did not allow them to possess a Qur'an. Prison authorities also often did not permit inmates to pray five times a day or to adjust work and meal schedules for the Ramadan fast. As authorities still did not allow visits by independent outside monitors to places of detention, there was no reliable way of knowing whether these conditions persisted or of verifying reports that religious prisoners were beaten or subjected to especially harsh treatment, such as being isolated or beaten for refusing to sign letters of repentance renouncing what the authorities deemed religious extremism.

Authorities often harass or arrest family members of persons wanted in connection with Islamic political activities or already jailed in connection with those activities. Although there are exceptions, in many cases the relative's only crime is association.

In previous reporting periods, there were several cases in which authorities detained women for participating in or organizing demonstrations demanding the release of male relatives jailed on suspicion of Islamic extremism. There were no such reports in this reporting period; however, authorities appeared to target women whose husbands were in prison. On April 27, 2007, the Tashkent City Criminal Court convicted seven of the eight women arrested for their alleged HT membership but released the seven with suspended sentences. Human Rights Watch stated that although the eight women were accused of forming a HT "cohort," it was clear from witness testimony that the women did not all know each other. The only facts linking the women together were that they all had husbands or close relatives in prison and that they all had testified as witnesses in previous trials. In contrast to previous years, there were no reports that police insulted or forced some women to remove their head coverings.

In previous reporting periods, there were reports that police planted narcotics, ammunition, and religious leaflets on citizens to justify their arrests, and that police arrested many of those with outward signs of religious observance, such as traditional clothing or beards. It was not possible to determine whether the absence of new reports reflected improvement or a decrease in information flow.

There were also reports that authorities tortured and beat evangelical Christians or failed to punish community members who did so. No arrests were made in connection with the December 18, 2006, attack by hired thugs on a Pentecostal Church deacon. There were no new developments in the June 2005 alleged torture of a Pentecostal Christian in Tashkent reported in numerous media outlets.

Any religious service conducted by an unregistered religious organization is illegal. Police occasionally broke up meetings of unregistered evangelical congregations and detained their members. With a few exceptions, authorities often charged those detained with administrative fines of 50 to 100 times the minimum wage.

As in previous years, there were numerous reports that Christian evangelicals were detained, often for a week or more. A reliable source reported that on April 7, 2007, police raided the service of the unregistered Baptist Church of Guliston and detained its pastor, Victor Klimov, who was charged under several articles of the Administrative Code. On February 8, 2007, Samarkand police arrested a Kazakh citizen pastor affiliated with the Greater Grace Church and held him in detention for 11 days.

Hudoer Pardaev and Igor Kim, members of God's Love Pentecostal Church from the Jizzak region, were sentenced on June 12, 2007, to 10 days in prison for "illegally" teaching religion by the Yangiabad District Court.

On January 15, 2007, police in Nukus reportedly raided a Presbyterian church service held in a private home and arrested 18 worshipers. Authorities charged several on violations of the Administrative Code and fined them. One detainee, Salavat Serikbayev, was tried on criminal charges of teaching religion illegally. On May 10, 2007, the Nukus Criminal Court convicted Serikbayev but released him with a 2-year suspended sentence, during which time he is on probation and prohibited from traveling abroad and required to pay 20 percent of his earnings to the state. On April 9, 2007, a second detainee, Pastor Grigory Ten, was fined $490 (621,000 soum) for several violations of the Administrative Code, a large sum for residents of Karakalpakstan.

On August 24, 2006, police raided a house in the village of Uch-kiliz (near Termez) and detained 17 members of the Union of Independent Churches, many of whom were subsequently beaten. Most of the detainees were freed within 24 hours, but five of them were held until September 4, 2006.

In this reporting period, there were several reported instances of the Government raiding services and imposing fines for worshipping, teaching, proselytizing, or other unauthorized religious activity. Although the authorities tolerated the existence of many Christian evangelical groups, they strictly enforced the law's ban on proselytizing, and often harassed, detained or fined those who openly tried to convert Muslims to Christianity. On April 12, 2007, Bukhara provincial authorities fined a local Pentecostal $56 (70,000 soum) on administrative charges of teaching religion without specialized training. On May 16, 2007, two members of Dmitry Shestakov's Full Gospel Church in Andijon were fined approximately $20 (25,200 soum) for obstruction of justice.

During the period of this report, the Government particularly targeted Full Gospel (Pentecostal) churches. This targeting continued a pattern from the previous reporting period. In December 2006 the pastor of the Resurrection Pentecostal Church in Andijon, which had long been denied registration, was fined $85 (109,500 soum) for holding "illegal" meetings. Under intense pressure from local authorities and mahalla leaders, the Resurrection Pentecostal Church decided to close its congregation in June 2007.

A reliable source reported that on December 27, 2006, the Nukus town court fined Makset Djabbarbergenov, the pastor of an unregistered Christian church, $440 (540,000 soum) for several violations of the Administrative Code. On October 25, 2006, six members of the Separated Baptists Church were fined between $85 (108,000 soum) and $430 (540,000 soum) by the Karshi town court for violating article 240 of the Administrative Code. A reliable source reported that on December 7, 2006, the Karshi town court dropped or reduced the fines against four of the members.

A reliable source reported that authorities dropped charges against three members of the Jesus Christ Charismatic Church in Tashkent who were detained for several days in April 2006 while engaged in humanitarian activities at a children's hospital.

Jehovah's Witnesses also came under particular scrutiny and occasionally faced arrest on charges of proselytizing. On June 6, 2007, Dilafruz Arziyeva, a member of the Jehovah's Witnesses Samarkand congregation, was convicted of illegally teaching religion and sentenced to 2 years of corrective labor. On May 14, 2007, another member of the Jehovah's Witnesses Samarkand congregation, Irfan Hamidov, was also convicted of the same charge and sentenced to 2 years' detention in a labor camp after a trial in which witnesses’ testimony favorable to his case was erased from the record.

On April 2, 2007, local police disrupted approximately five Jehovah's Witnesses congregations in three cities during annual worship services commemorating the death of Jesus. There were reports that one worshiper in Samarkand was injured when a police officer beat him on the head. These disruptions were far less severe than in 2006 and 2005, when hundreds of Jehovah's Witnesses were taken into custody, several were reportedly beaten, and many were subjected to large fines and brief administrative detention following raids on annual memorial services in several cities. On February 19, 2008, police officers and local officials of Samarkand raided the homes of Jehovah's Witnesses and took 18 congregation members to the police station. One of the victims was a 17-year-old girl who was reportedly stripped and fondled by an intoxicated police officer. Ozod Saidov, also 17 years old, had his hair pulled and was hit repeatedly on the head. Muhayyo Abdulhakova, a 14-year-old-girl, was interrogated alone and was threatened with being beaten. Akmaral Rahmonberdiyeva was arrested while she was visiting her friend Yana Karimova. The police searched Karimova's apartment and took them both in for questioning.

All the victims faced extreme pressure to incriminate fellow members and disclose private information. All were severely abused verbally and were threatened with physical assault. Some of the officers participating in these raids were said to be drunk, as were "eye-witnesses" called on to serve as search witnesses. In many cases, no warrants were provided to justify the raids, nor was legal protocol adhered to. Various personal belongings disappeared from the homes of the individuals searched, including identification papers and employment documents. An infirm 86-year-old woman lay helpless as the police searched her son's home and confiscated their belongings. When the police could not find any Bible literature in Yuriy Khasanov's apartment, they reportedly planted 11 magazines and a brochure in the Uzbek language, and then they arrested him on the pretense that these items belonged to him.

Most of these incidents occurred on February 19. The police and officials who participated have not been held accountable for this string of human rights violations, behavior that indicates a steady deterioration of human rights in Uzbekistan.

There were several cases during the reporting period in which authorities deported members of religious minority groups from the country, presumably based upon their religious affiliation. Forum 18 reported that in mid-June 2007, a Tajik Pentecostal who had lived in the country for more than ten years was deported to Tajikistan. The Pentecostal was arrested after meeting in a church member's house in Tashkent in late May and held in jail for 22 days before being deported. On August 11, 2006, Interior Ministry officers in Tashkent deported Ivan Bychkov, a member of the Bethany Baptist Church, to Russia, reportedly without explanation. Bychkov, a Russian citizen, had been resident in Tashkent for many years. On September 5, 2006, Tashkent authorities deported Viktoria Khrypunova, the Russian-citizen wife of Pastor Sergei Khrypunov of the Bethany Baptist Church. As in Bychkov's case, authorities reportedly gave no explanation for Khrypunova's deportation.

On April 25, 2008, the Samarkand Criminal Court sentenced Olim Turayev, a Jehovah's Witness, to four years in a labor colony for teaching his religious beliefs to others and for organizing illegal religious activity, acts that according to Articles 229-2 and 216 of the Uzbekistan Criminal Code are punishable crimes.

=== Forced religious conversion ===
There were no reports of forced religious conversion, including of minor U.S. citizens who had been abducted or illegally removed from the United States, or of the refusal to allow such citizens to be returned to the United States.

However, in July 2026 Savariya Basanth, a Hindu Indian medical student was murdered by Sadarul Anam, a fellow student at Bukhara State Medical Institute, Uzbekistan. The victim's family has alleged that she told them that she was being forced to convert to another religion.

=== Improvements and Positive Developments in Respect for Religious Freedom ===
Since 2003 the Government has allowed former Mufti Muhammad Sodiq Muhammad Yusuf to publish widely on a variety of religious topics in both print and electronic formats. His popular Islamic website remained unblocked by the Government and he continued to host a popular radio program on Islam and to teach at the Islamic University.

Authorities allowed a small number of unregistered mosques to reopen, both in cities and in the countryside. In addition, non state sanctioned imams continued to work, particularly in rural areas, under the close watch of religious officials. Reports noted that the atmosphere in the Muslim community has improved somewhat, as observant Muslims were allowed to practice their faith within these controlled environments.

The Government continued to respect the military pacifism of Jehovah's Witnesses. The draft board routinely gave exemptions. On April 2, Jehovah's Witnesses throughout Uzbekistan encountered far less harassment than in the past 2 years in the course of their annual memorial services commemorating Jesus' death.

During the period covered by this report, the Government continued to tolerate the use of head coverings by Muslim women. The hijab was seen frequently in Tashkent, the more religiously conservative parts of the Ferghana Valley, and in other regions. The CRA took the position that women should not be barred from educational institutions on the basis of their religious dress and actively assisted women who had been previously expelled to gain readmission to their universities. During the period covered by this report, it was more common to see women on the street wearing the hijab and, much less frequently, the veil.

There were reports of recent cases where authorities have dismissed charges against Protestants after their lawyer protested procedural matters or evidence. Forum 18 reported that in March 2007 prosecutors tried to bring a case against Vyacheslav Tskhe, a youth leader of the registered Grace Pentecostal Church in the Mirzo-Ulugbek District of Tashkent, for several violations of the Administrative Code. However, after Tskhe protested to several state agencies about the actions of a police officer involved in the case, the charges against Tskhe were dropped and the police officer was reprimanded. On February 10, 2007, police raided a house in the town of Gazli (near Bukhara) and detained six members of the Pentecostal Church. The charges against them were later dropped and the arresting police officers disciplined. On February 5, 2007, the Chilanzar District Court in Tashkent dropped charges against five members of the Pentecostal church who had been charged with violating several articles of the Administrative Code.

The US State Department published a regular report on religious freedom for 2019, which assessed the state of religious freedom in the world. The document is published annually and, on its basis, the US Secretary of State makes a decision on whether to classify a particular state as a "country of special concern". Presenting the report, Secretary of State Mike Pompeo stressed the priority importance of religious freedom issues in the US foreign policy agenda and assessed the situation in a number of countries. Mike Pompeo separately pointed out the progress of Uzbekistan in this area. According to him, Uzbekistan has taken serious steps to improve the situation with religious freedom. A separate address was made by Sam Brownback, Ambassador-at-large for religious freedoms. «due to recent improvements, both Sudan and Uzbekistan have been removed from the list of Countries of Particular Concern. Major accomplishments and major things happening», he said.

== Societal abuses and discrimination ==
Uzbek society is generally tolerant of religious diversity but not of proselytizing. The population maintained its long tradition of secularism and religious tolerance. In particular, Muslim, Russian Orthodox, Roman Catholic, and Jewish leaders reported high levels of acceptance in society. Evangelical or Pentecostal Christian churches and churches with ethnic Uzbek converts encountered difficulties stemming from discrimination. There were persistent reports that ethnic Uzbeks who converted to Christianity faced discrimination and harassment.

State-controlled media in some cases encouraged societal prejudice against evangelical Christians. After state television featured a two-part documentary directed against Christian evangelicals in November 2006, members of a leading Tashkent Pentecostal church reported severe harassment and escalating threats from their local community, culminating in a December 18, 2006, attack by hired thugs on a church deacon. Some of the articles in the state-controlled press included quotes from Russian Orthodox clerics criticizing evangelical activity.

There was no pattern of discrimination against Jews. Synagogues, Hebrew education, Jewish cultural events, and the publication of a community newspaper take place openly and undisturbed. Many Jews have emigrated to the United States and Israel, most likely because of bleak economic prospects and connections to families abroad, rather than anti-Jewish sentiment. There are Jewish kindergartens in Tashkent and Samarkand officially teaching Jewish culture. Investigations established that anti-Semitism was not a motive in the February 2006 death of a Tashkent Jewish community leader, Avraam Yagudayev, or the June 2006 killings of a twenty-year-old secretary to prominent Tashkent-based Rabbi David Gurevich, Karina Loifer, and her mother.

Unlike in previous years, there was only one report of individuals being charged with the distribution of HT leaflets, which often contain strong anti-Semitic rhetoric, during the period of this report. On August 10, 2006, the Uzbek Customs Committee stated on a government-run website that two Kazakh citizens were arrested for possessing HT books, magazines and leaflets.

== 2020s ==
In 2020, US State Department Secretary Mike Pompeo said Sudan and Uzbekistan have been removed from the Special Watch List based on significant, concrete progress undertaken by their respective governments over the past year. "Their courageous reforms of their laws and practices stand as models for other nations to follow," he said.

In 2023, the country was scored zero out of 4 for religious freedom; it was noted that the president has relaxed some laws since 2016. In the same year, it was ranked as the 21st worst country in the world to be a Christian.

== See also ==
- Human rights in Uzbekistan
- Religious abuse
- Religion in Uzbekistan
- Societal abuse
