= Marilyn Hickey =

American Christian minister and televangelist (1931–2026)

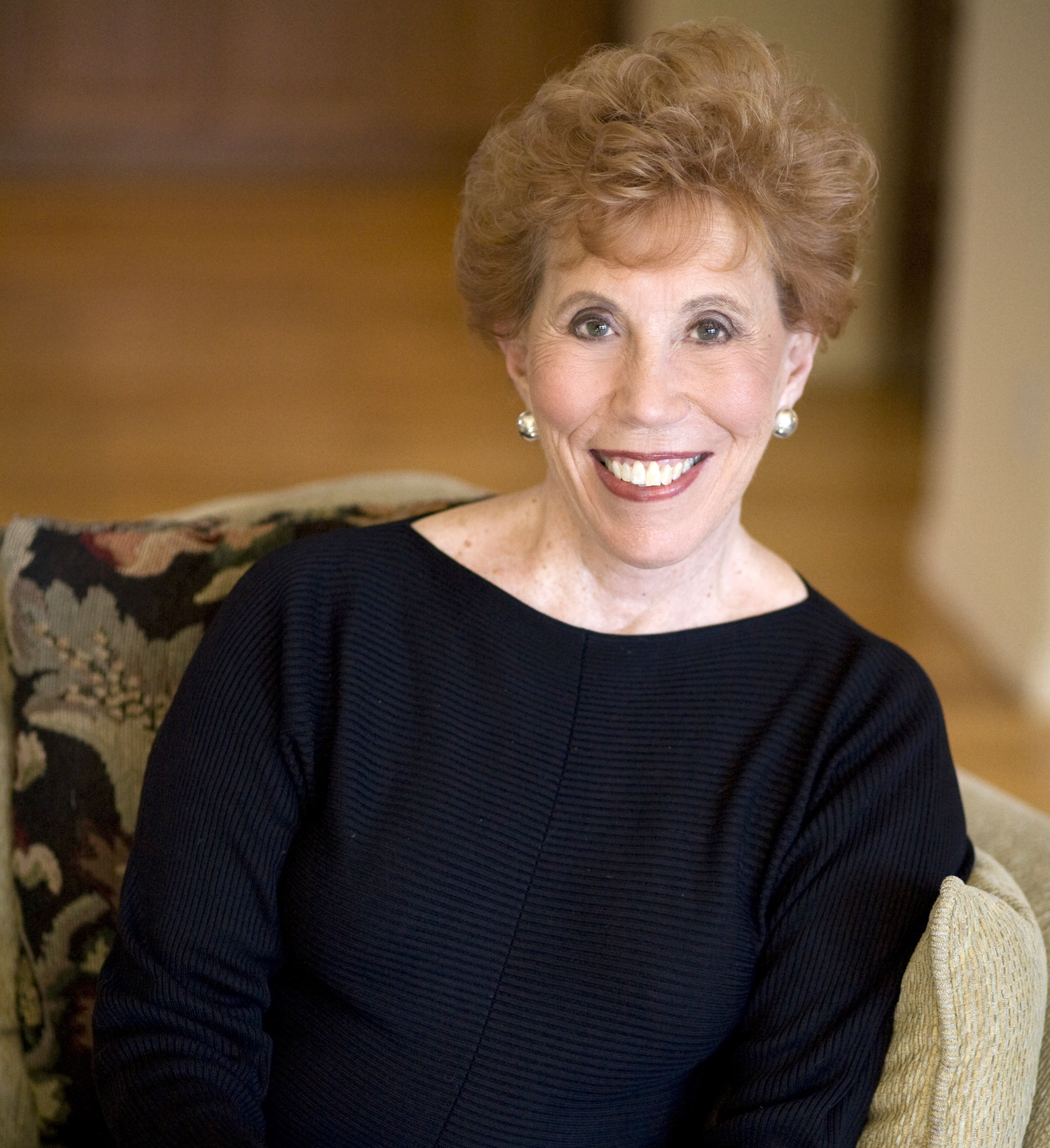
- Hickey in 2008
- Born: Marilyn Allene Hickey; July 1, 1931; Dalhart, Texas, U.S.
- Died: April 25, 2026 (aged 94); Denver, Colorado, U.S.
- Education: University of Northern Colorado
- Occupations: Televangelist; pastor; author; bible teacher; conference speaker
- Years active: 1960–2026
- Spouse: Wallace Hickey (m. 1954; died 2012)
- Children: 2

Ecclesiastical career
- Religion: Christianity
- Church: Pentecostal
- Congregations: Orchard Road Christian Center, Denver, Colorado co-pastor with husband Wallace
- Offices held: Member, Board Of Regents, Oral Roberts University
- Title: Founder, Marilyn Hickey Ministries Int'l co-host Marilyn & Sarah TV program (with daughter Sarah)

Marilyn Allene Hickey (July 1, 1931 – April 25, 2026) was an American Christian televangelist, pastor, bible teacher, motivational speaker and author, who taught Bible studies both nationally and internationally.

== Biography ==
Marilyn Allene Hickey was born on July 1, 1931, in Dalhart, Texas. When she was a young girl, Hickey's parents were professing Methodists and attended church only casually. Her family suffered from hereditary mental disorders according to one of her telecasts. Her father, her grandfather, and her great-grandfather had suffered. Before the "devil and his imps" got to Marilyn, at the age of 36, she was the only one in her family not to suffer a mental disorder.

She also said that her family had a history of heart diseases, especially Hickey herself. At age 11, she was told by her doctors she had an enlarged heart, and it progressively got worse until she had surgery. She became a born-again Christian as a teenager. In college, she studied Spanish, intending to become a public high school teacher.

After meeting Wallace Hickey at an Assemblies of God Church, where Wallace served as a pastor, the couple married on December 26, 1954. Around the same time, she and Wallace also met Dr. T.L. Osborn, a Pentecostal evangelist, who was 8 years Hickey's senior. Marilyn and Wallace traveled around in their car, conducting tent revival meetings in various towns. Together, Osborn and Hickey prayed for the sick, and she became a guest speaker at his conferences. Osborn was a lifelong friend of her family until his death just four months after Hickey lost her husband, Wallace.

Hickey held a Bachelor of Arts in Collective Foreign Languages from the University of Northern Colorado and an Honorary Doctorate of Divinity from Oral Roberts University.

She had two children and four grandchildren. Hickey's husband of 57 years, Wallace, died after a long battle with Alzheimer's disease, at a care center in Denver, Colorado, on October 19, 2012, at the age of 87. Marilyn Hickey died in Denver on April 25, 2026, at the age of 94.

=== Today with Marilyn and Sarah television program ===
Hickey aired a television program from 1973 and, from 1996, co-hosted it with her daughter, Sarah Bowling (born February 1, 1968). Today with Marilyn and Sarah can be seen on various Christian networks such as the DayStar Network, Channel C, TCT Network, Cornerstone Television Network, and independent stations in both the U.S. and internationally, as well as through her YouTube Channel. She has also been seen on the Trinity Broadcasting Network (TBN).

=== Missionary works ===
In 2012, Hickey held a three-day prayer and faith healing rally in Karachi, Pakistan, which was attended by over 400,000 people. On November 12, 2016, with her seventh trip to Pakistan, she aimed at reaching 1,000,000 people in a single meeting in Karachi.

Hickey served on the Board of Regents of Oral Roberts University.

== See also ==
- Apologetics
- Charismatics
- Faith healing
- Full Gospel
- Glossolalia
- Pentecostalism
