= The Gardens on Havana =

- Location: Aurora, Colorado, U.S.
- Address: 10551 East Garden Drive
- Opened: 1971
- Previous names: Buckingham Square
- Developer: Sherman Dreiseszun
- Manager: AmCap Incorporated
- Num. of stores: 100+ (Buckingham Square)
- Num. of anchor tenants: 4 (Buckingham Square); 9 (Gardens on Havana)
- Floor area: 828,346 square feet (76,955.9 m^{2}) (Buckingham Square); 496,647 square feet (46,140.0 m^{2}) (Gardens on Havana)
- Floors: 1

The Gardens on Havana is a shopping mall in Aurora, Colorado, United States. Built in 1971 as Buckingham Square, the mall underwent a decline in tenancy throughout the 1990s which resulted in the closure of most stores. Demolished between 2007 and 2008, it was redeveloped and reopened in 2009 as a lifestyle center. Major tenants include Target, Dick's Sporting Goods, and Kohl's.

== History ==
Buckingham Square Mall was built by Sherman Dreiseszun and opened for business on August 5, 1971.

Among the major tenants of the mall were Joslins and Montgomery Ward department stores, along with a Safeway supermarket, a Woolworth dime store, and two local chains: Fashion Bar department store and Dave Cook Sporting Goods. At its peak, the mall consisted of over 828,346 square feet (76,955.9 m^{2}) of retail space with over 110 stores. Despite its size, the mall suffered decreases in tenancy throughout the 1980s and into the 1990s as Safeway, Woolworth, Fashion Bar, and Dave Cook Sporting Goods all closed, followed by Montgomery Ward. Also, the Joslins chain was sold to Dillard's in 1998, and a Mervyns was added.

In 2004, Miller Weingarten Realty LLC bought the mall. One year later, the company announced plans to redevelop the mall into a lifestyle center, a type of outdoor mall featuring streetscapes and a mix of non-retail uses.

At the time of purchase, the Montgomery Ward store had been demolished for a Target store. Also, both Dillard's and Mervyns closed in 2006.

Demolition began on January 8, 2008, with a targeted opening date of 2009. The existing Target store was retained, while the rest of the property consisted entirely of new structures. Official reopening occurred in 2009. Major tenants of the mall include Kohl's, Dick's Sporting Goods, Petco, Ross, Sprouts Farmer's Market, Target, and Office Depot. Overall, The Gardens on Havana consists of over 496,647 square feet (46,140.0 m^{2}) of retail space, and is owned by AmCap Incorporated.
