= Crossroads Mall (Colorado) =

Former shopping mall in Boulder, Colorado, United States

Coordinates: 40°1′7.8″N 105°15′26″W

The Crossroads Mall was an indoor shopping mall from 1963 until 2004, in Boulder, Colorado.

== History ==
=== Development ===
Crossroads Mall opened on March 14, 1963, with 394,000 leasable square feet for retail stores, surrounded by open-air parking. Anchor stores included J. C. Penney and Montgomery Ward, as well as a Randall Shop, the small-format version of The Denver Dry Goods Company. In March 1976, Denver Dry Goods expanded the 10,000 square foot Randall Shop into a 60,000 square foot full-line "the Denver". In August 1979, Macerich acquired Crossroads Mall for $12 million. A 1983 remodeling and expansion doubled the size of the mall and included the addition of a food court and another anchor store, May D&F (later renamed Foley's and, still later, Macy's). In March 1986, Mervyn's was added as an additional anchor. In October 1987, "the Denver" closed and was replaced by Sears. In 1990, May D&F expanded, bringing the size of the mall to 820,000 square feet (76,000 m^{2}). A small parking ramp was also added adjacent to May D&F on the east side of the mall

=== Decline ===
The years just before and after 2000 saw increasing competition for Crossroads Mall from new retail developments in Superior, Broomfield, and Westminster. In September 1997, Montgomery Ward closed its store at Crossroads Mall; aside from a short stint as Gart Sports, this space would remain vacant until demolition. In October 1997, the vacancy rate at Crossroads was 19%. In January 1998, Mervyn's closed. Sears took advantage of the opportunity and moved into the larger anchor space.

From 1997 to 2002, various Crossroads reconstruction ideas were floated and then rejected. Fast-track construction of a Dillard's store was proposed, but vetoed by Foley's. In October 1999, Macerich began a 13-month renovation project by closing the southern half of the mall and tearing down some interior walls. In July 2000, Macerich put its renovation plans on hold, stopped the project, and announced that it was looking for a buyer for Crossroads. Flatiron Crossing Mall, in Broomfield, opened in August 2000. In April 2001, J. C. Penney closed its store at Crossroads Mall. In June 2002, the owner of Flatiron Crossing Mall (Westcor) was acquired by the owner of Crossroads Mall (Macerich).

=== Demolition ===
On January 23, 2003, the Sears store at Crossroads Mall closed. Plans were submitted to the city to tear down Crossroads Mall and create a new retail district, dubbed "Twenty Ninth Street". The plans were for about 50-60 shops and a movie theatre. The city agreed, and Macerich/Westcor sprung into action. On January 8, 2004, the closing of Crossroads Mall was announced. The mall closed in February 2004, with the exception of Foley's, the only store to survive from Crossroads to the new Twenty Ninth Street. Except for the Mervyn's building, Foley's/Macy's and its adjacent parking structure, Crossroads Mall was demolished, and on October 13, 2006, the Twenty Ninth Street retail district opened on the site of the defunct Crossroads.

== The New Twenty Ninth Street retail district ==
The new Twenty Ninth Street retail district opened on October 13, 2006. Unlike the indoor design of the Crossroads Mall, the new Twenty Ninth Street retail district is an outdoor shopping neighborhood.
