= Belmar (Lakewood) =

- Location: Lakewood, Colorado, United States
- Coordinates: 39.707332°N 105.077661°W
- Address: 7337 W Alaska Drive Lakewood, CO 80226
- Opened: March 10, 1966 (as villa italia mall) = 2004 (as Belmar)
- Closed: July 15, 2001 (as villa italia mall)
- Manager: Jones Lang LaSalle (JLL)
- Owner: Bridge33 Capital
- Num. of stores: 80+
- Website: belmarcolorado.com

Belmar is a shopping mall in Downtown Lakewood, Colorado that opened in 2004 as a redevelopment of the Villa Italia Mall. It is owned and managed by Bridge33 Capital.

There are over 80 stores including Best Buy, DSW, Target, Century Theatres and Sola Salons.
