= Westminster Mall (Colorado) =

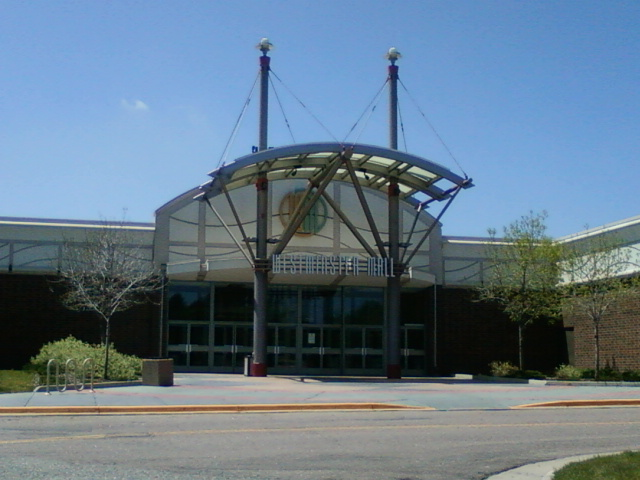
- Northeast entrance to Westminster Mall
- Location: Westminster, Colorado, United States
- Coordinates: 39.859°N 105.060°W
- Address: 5433 W. 88th Avenue
- Opened: 1977
- Closed: June 30, 2011
- Manager: MD Management, Inc.
- Num. of stores: 187
- Num. of anchor tenants: 6
- Floor area: 1,200,000 sq ft (110,000 m^{2})
- Floors: 1

Westminster Mall was an enclosed shopping mall in Westminster, Colorado, a suburb of Denver, Colorado, United States. Opened in 1977, the mall featured one anchor store (Joslins). Former anchors were Dillard's, Montgomery Ward, Mervyn's, Sears, and Macy's. The mall also included a food court and formerly included a movie theater. It was also a dead mall, having closed in June 2011.

== History ==
Westminster Mall opened in 1977 with Joslin's and thirty other stores. In 1980, they added the hallway that connected to the soon-to-be May D&F store, thus increasing the stores to 75. A 1986 expansion added May D&F, Mervyn's, and Broadway Southwest, and 112 more stores and a modern food court, followed by JCPenney in 1987 and Wards in 1996. The expansions brought the mall to 1,200,000 square feet (110,000 m^{2}) of gross leasable area (GLA), making it one of the largest in the Denver metropolitan area, as well as the only one with six department stores.

May D&F was converted to Foley's in 1993. Two years after a 1996 remodel of the store, Joslin's was converted to Dillard's, which also acquired land around the mall. Broadway Southwest was the last store in its chain to close, doing so in 1996 and soon being replaced by Sears, which relocated from Northglenn Mall. In September 2006, Foley's was re-branded as Macy's.

Between 1997 and 2009, the mall would lose three of its six department stores as well as major tenant Fashion Bar, which closed in 1997. Wards closed in 2001 with the demise of the chain, followed by Mervyn's closing in 2005. Mervyn's departed from the Colorado market in 2006. Macy's closed in early 2009. With the loss of these anchor stores, the mall has also become increasingly vacant, and is only half occupied as of 2009. In June 2009, the mall's owners purchased the vacant Mervyn's as part of a redevelopment plan.

As of May 2011, the City of Westminster is reported to have purchased the mall for redevelopment. Plans called for the 34-year-old mall to be demolished by the end of the year with hopes that the anchor stores would remain open. On May 13, 2011, Dillard's reported that it would close its location at the mall during its second quarter of business in 2011. Demolition of the mall began on June 23, 2011, starting off with the demolition of Macy's.

The mall's interior officially closed to public access on June 30, 2011, although Sears, JCPenney, Dillard's and several outlying businesses remained open.

On January 20, 2012, it was announced that Sears would also be closing in June 2012 as part of a plan to close 81 stores nationwide which left JCPenney as the only remaining anchor. On January 24, 2012, it was further confirmed that the City of Westminster would purchase the 7.9 acre parcel from Sears Holding Corp. for $4.2 million.

By the spring of 2012, three anchors, Macy's, Mervyn's, and Montgomery Ward, two restaurants, Trail Dust Steakhouse and Steak & Ale, the cinema and remaining mall corridor had been demolished. The demolition of Dillard's began that spring. The demolition of Sears started in August 2012.

Plans for the former Westminster Mall location were revealed August 27, 2013. Westminster's plans for a new downtown on the site of the former Westminster Mall took another step forward during an August 26 presentation outlining a development that includes multi-story office and residential buildings, unique public spaces and vibrant shopping areas.

The master plan will provide a framework and vision for the new downtown as development occurs over the next 20–30 years. Key components of the plan include allowed land uses, public parks and plazas, multi-modal circulation and access to transit, urban design, development flexibility, and taking advantage of the views the site has of the Front Range.
