= The Streets at SouthGlenn =

Shopping center in Colorado

Southglenn Mall
- Location: Centennial, Colorado, United States
- Coordinates: 39°35′31″N 104°57′47″W
- Address: Southwest corner of Arapahoe Road and South University Boulevard
- Opened: 1974
- Closed: 2006
- Demolished: 2006
- Developer: Jordon Perlmutter
- Num. of anchor tenants: 3
- Floor area: 700,000 sq ft (65,000 m^{2})

Southglenn Mall was a mid-size shopping center located on South University Boulevard in Centennial, Colorado, at the southwest corner of Arapahoe Road and University Boulevard. The center opened in 1974 and was closed from 2006 to August 2009 to make way for The Streets at SouthGlenn, a mixed-use redevelopment project.

== History ==
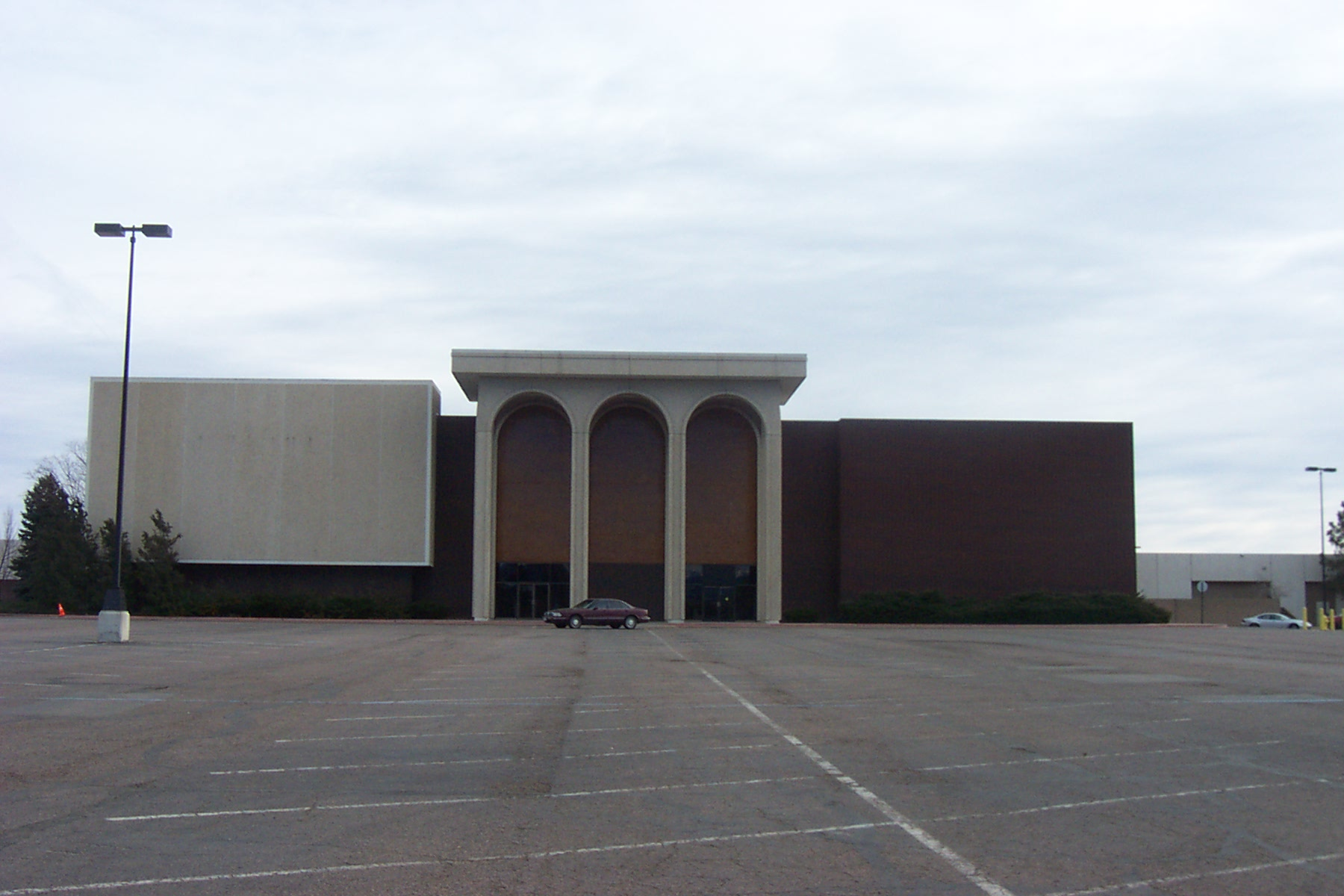
The abandoned The Denver/JCPenney/JCPenney Home Store on the west side of Southglenn Mall

In 1974 for $40 million, the Southglenn Mall opened with anchor stores Sears, The Denver (Denver Dry Goods) and May D&F. The mall was developed by Denver-based Jordan Perlmutter & Co., the same company that built Northglenn Mall and Southwest Plaza. In 1987, May Department Stores purchased Associated Dry Goods, operator of The Denver. May D&F remained at Southglenn while The Denver's building was sold to JCPenney. In 1988, the mall's first renovation took place. Asbestos abatement was undertaken at this time. In 1993, May D&F rebranded as Foley's, following the acquisition of Foley's from Federated in 1988 by parent May Department Stores. In 1994, Joslins Department Store constructed a $23 million, 160,000-square-foot (15,000 m^{2}) flagship store on the east side of the mall. In 1996, Southglenn sales slumped following the debut of Park Meadows, a Douglas County center with anchors Dillard's, Foley's, Nordstrom, and Joslins. In 1998, Joslins became Dillard's after Joslins parent Mercantile Stores was acquired by Dillard's. In early January 1999, Southglenn Mall was sold to Chicago-based Walton Street Capital. In 1999, JCPenney converted to JCPenney Home Store following the opening of a new JCPenney store at Park Meadows Mall. In 2001, Southglenn underwent a minor interior renovation. The ceilings in the main corridors were redesigned, and new tiles, lights, and bannisters were installed in an attempt to stave off the exodus of some small and mid-size tenants to newer malls around the area. In 2002, the JCPenney Home Store closed. In 2005, Alberta Development Partners and the City of Centennial announced their plan to redevelop the mall into Streets at Southglenn. In 2005, following a large snowstorm, Southglenn's west parking lots served as a drop off for tree limbs. In February 2006, Southglenn Mall and Dillard's closed their doors in preparation for redevelopment. Sears and Macy's remained open at this time. Though the Walgreens on the mall's exterior closed, pharmaceutical operations continued uninterrupted from a temporary building on the east side of the mall property until a new permanent structure could be erected. Demolition of the former mall structure commenced mid-June. On June 15, 2006, groundbreaking for redevelopment occurred at 11 AM local time. On July 17, 2008, Best Buy opened. On August 28, 2009, Streets at Southglenn opened. In March 2026, Lucky Charm Bridal opened its doors. Decorated with pink furniture and a disco ball, the boutique offers gowns from well-known design designers alongside its own label, Maison Bon Chance, which means “house of good luck.”

== Demolition and redevelopment ==
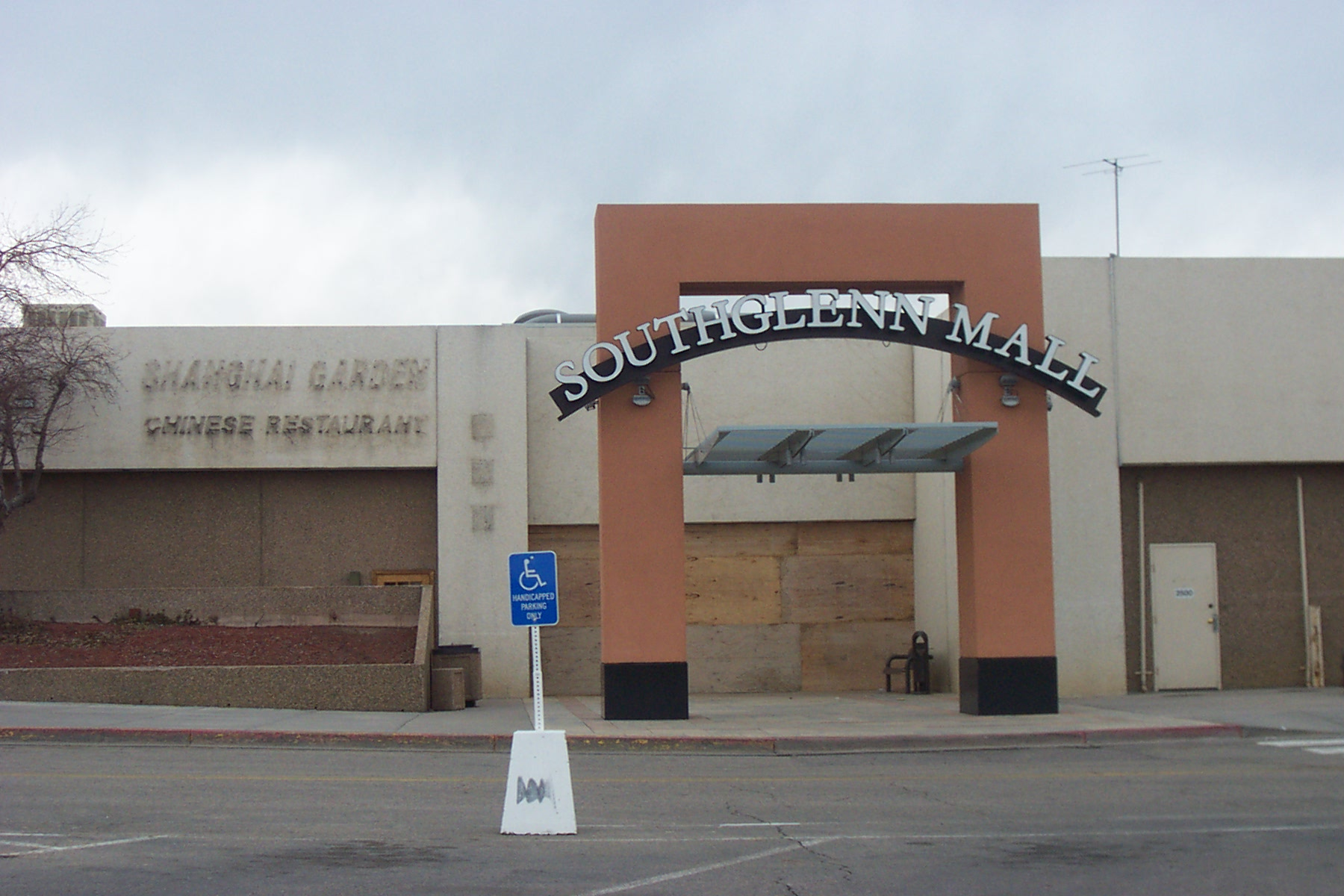
Southglenn Mall's east entrance, boarded up for demolition

The majority of the former mall structure between Macy's and Sears was removed. The mall's concrete building pad was removed, crushed, and piled for reuse. The redeveloped Streets at SouthGlenn sports a variety of entertainment and shopping, along with space for business and residential uses.

The new junior anchors as of 2012 are: Macy's Home Store, Staples, Dick's Sporting Goods, and Best Buy. Other anchors include Macy's, and a Hollywood Theaters (currently operated by Regal) location with 14 screens, and a Whole Foods Market. One of the largest spaces in the redevelopment was slated to be occupied by Barnes & Noble, but in 2012 an Old Navy store opened in this location. As of 2026, Macy's Home Store, Staples, Dick's Sporting Goods, and Best Buy have all been closed.

On October 15, 2018, it was announced that Sears would be closing as part of a plan to close 142 stores nationwide.

On January 5, 2022, it was announced that Macy's would be closing as part of a plan to close 7 stores nationwide. It is the last store from the original mall.
