= List of shopping malls in Arkansas =

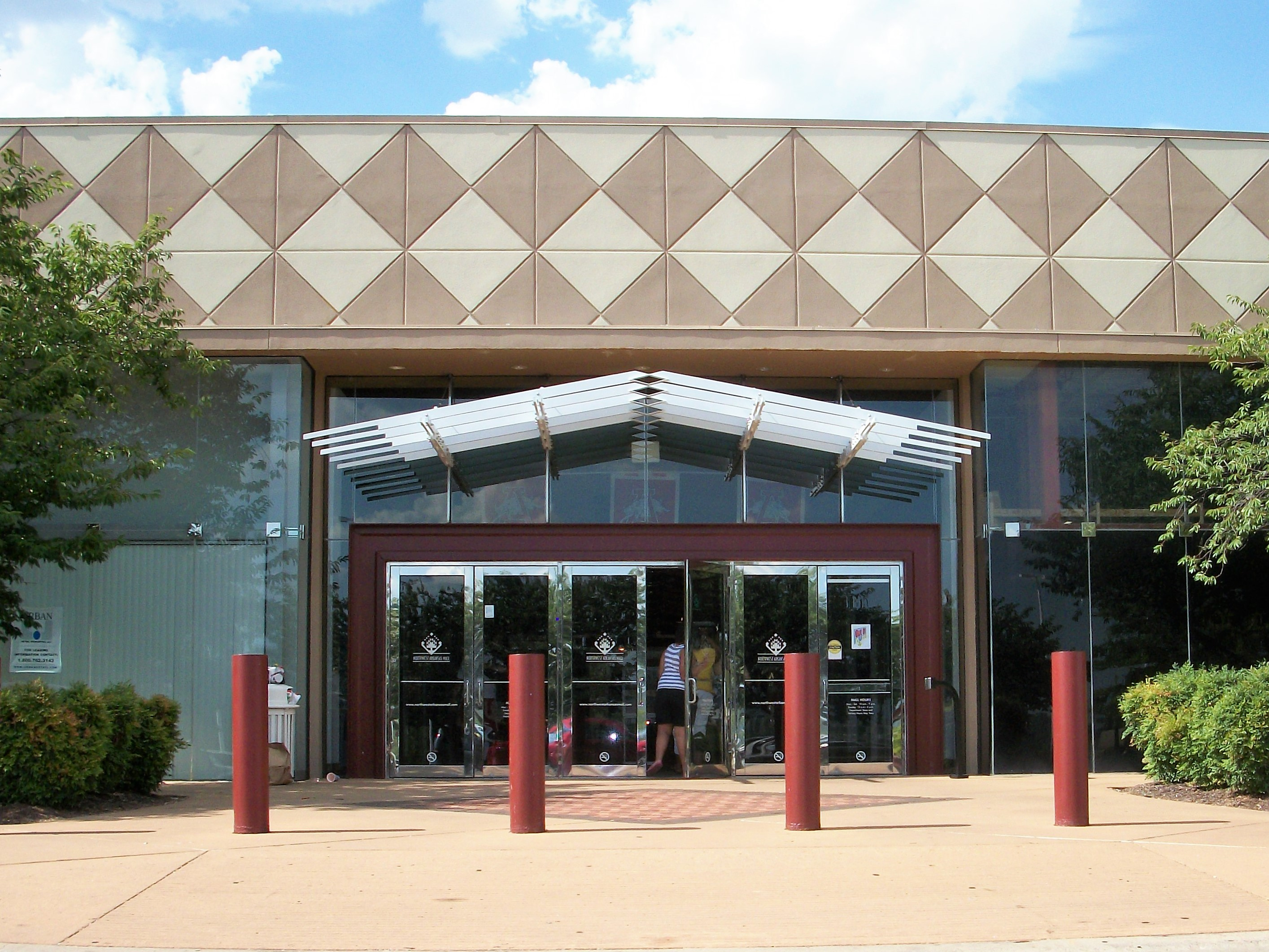
Northwest Arkansas Mall

The history of shopping malls in Arkansas began in 1970 with the opening of Phoenix Village Mall in Fort Smith. As of 2016, the state has 21 malls and lifestyle centers. Six malls, including Phoenix Village, have been demolished or converted to other uses.

The biggest mall is Central Mall in Fort Smith; it has 141 stores.

== Current ==
Name	Location	Gross leasable area sq ft / m²	Format	Owner
Mellor Park Mall	El Dorado	280,000 square feet (26,000 m^{2})	Enclosed	Surendra and Sajal Agarwal
Northwest Arkansas Mall	Fayetteville	820,581 square feet (76,000 m^{2})	Enclosed	Midwest Mall Properties
Central Mall	Fort Smith	860,156 square feet (80,000 m^{2})	Enclosed	Jones Lang LaSalle
Fashion Center	Harrison	139,000 square feet (13,000 m^{2})	Enclosed	Real Estate Southeast
Uptown Hot Springs	Hot Springs	482,652 square feet (45,000 m^{2})	Enclosed	Aronov Realty
The Mall at Turtle Creek	Jonesboro	731,637 square feet (68,000 m^{2})	Enclosed	Haag Brown Commercial Development & Real Estate
Park Plaza Mall	Little Rock	562,432 square feet (52,000 m^{2})	Enclosed	Deutsche Bank
The Promenade at Chenal	Little Rock	306,000 square feet (28,000 m^{2})	Lifestyle	RED Development
Outlets of Little Rock	Little Rock	325,000 square feet (30,000 m^{2})	Lifestyle	New England Development
Pleasant Ridge Town Center	Little Rock		Lifestyle	Lou Schickel
Shackleford Crossing	Little Rock		Lifestyle	Irwin Partners
McCain Mall	North Little Rock	790,000 square feet (73,000 m^{2})	Enclosed	Simon Property Group
Conway Commons	Conway	654,362 square feet (61,000 m^{2})	Lifestyle	Seayco Group
Lewis Crossing	Conway	441,871 square feet (41,000 m^{2})	Lifestyle	Collett
Conway Towne Centre	Conway	312,000 square feet (29,000 m^{2})	Lifestyle	Centro Properties
Frisco Station Mall	Rogers	242,535 square feet (23,000 m^{2})	Enclosed	J. Herzog & Sons
Pinnacle Hills Promenade	Rogers	1,136,400 square feet (110,000 m^{2})	Lifestyle	Brookfield Properties
City Mall	Russellville	129,956 square feet (12,000 m^{2})	Enclosed	

== Defunct ==
- Indian Mall, Jonesboro (May 1, 1968–February 2008)
- Main Street Mall, Little Rock
- The Mall at Turtle Creek, Jonesboro
- Metrocentre Mall, Little Rock
- Phoenix Village Mall, Fort Smith
- Pines Mall, Pine Bluff (1986-2020)
- Southwest Mall, Little Rock
- University Mall, Little Rock (1967–October 27, 2007)

== Canceled ==
- Otter Creek Mall, Little Rock
- The Shoppes at North Hills, North Little Rock
- Southern Hills Mall, Jonesboro
- Summit Mall, Little Rock
