= University Mall =

University Mall may refer to:

- University Mall (Alabama), in Tuscaloosa, Alabama
- University Mall (Arkansas), a defunct shopping mall in Little Rock, Arkansas
- University Mall (Florida), formerly University Square Mall, in Tampa, Florida
- University Mall (Illinois), in Carbondale, Illinois
- University Place (North Carolina), formerly University Mall, in Chapel Hill, North Carolina
- University Place (Utah), formerly University Mall, in Orem, Utah
- University Mall (Vermont), in Burlington, Vermont

== See also ==
- University Town Plaza, formerly University Mall, in Pensacola, Florida
- University Square
