= U Street =

U Street or "U" Street is the 22nd of a sequence of alphabetical streets in many cities (or the 21st if "I" or "J" is omitted).

It may refer to:

- U Street (Washington, D.C.), a street in Washington, D.C.
  - U Street (Washington, D.C.), commercial and residential district in northwest Washington, D.C.
  - U Street station, a Metro station in Washington, D.C. on the Green and Yellow Lines

== See also ==
- School of Hard Knocks or "University of the Streets"
- University/65th Street, a station in Sacramento, California
- Street University, a project of the Ted Noffs Foundation in New South Wales, Australia
- Avenue U (disambiguation)
- University Avenue (disambiguation)
- University Street (disambiguation)
