= University (disambiguation) =

A university is an institution of higher education.

University may also refer to:

== Places ==
- University, Hillsborough County, Florida, a census-designated place
- University, Orange County, Florida, a census-designated place
- University, Minneapolis, a community in Minneapolis, Minnesota, U.S.
  - University (neighborhood), Minneapolis, a neighborhood within the community
- University, Mississippi, a census-designated place adjacent to the city of Oxford and consisting of the main campus of the University of Mississippi
- University (constituency), Central and Western District Council, Hong Kong

== Entertainment ==
- University (album), a 1995 album by Throwing Muses
- "University" (The Sopranos)
- The Sims 2: University, first expansion pack of The Sims 2
- University (film), a 2002 Indian Tamil-language film by Praghadish

== See also ==
- University Avenue (disambiguation)
- University City (disambiguation)
- University College (disambiguation)
- University Peak (disambiguation)
- University Square (disambiguation)
- University Station (disambiguation)
- University Street (disambiguation)
- City University (disambiguation)
- College (disambiguation)
