= University Street (disambiguation) =

University Street is a portion of Robert-Bourassa Boulevard in Montreal, Quebec, Canada.

University Street may also refer to:

- University Street, Donetsk, Ukraine, a road

== See also ==
- University Street station, Seattle, Washington, United States, a transit station
- University (disambiguation)
- University Avenue (disambiguation)
- University Square (disambiguation)
