= Avenue U (disambiguation) =

Avenue U is a street in Brooklyn, New York City.

It may also refer to:

- Other streets named Avenue U in other cities
- Several subway stations of the New York City Subway in Brooklyn:
  - Avenue U (BMT Sea Beach Line), serving the N and W trains
  - Avenue U (IND Culver Line), serving the F and <F> trains
  - Avenue U (BMT Brighton Line), serving the Q train

== See also ==
- U Street (disambiguation)
- University Avenue (disambiguation)
