= Pavilion in the Park =

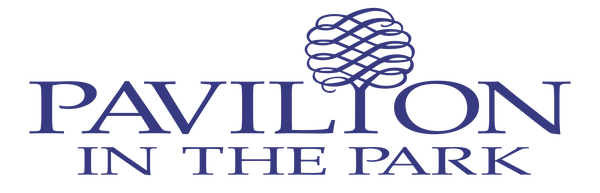
- Location: Little Rock, Arkansas, United States
- Coordinates: 34°46′35.04″N 92°21′58.32″W
- Address: 8201 Cantrell Road
- Opened: 1985
- Developer: C.D. Williams and David Jones
- Owner: Flake & Company
- Architect: Polk Stanley Yeary Architects
- Floor area: 67,300 square feet (6,250 m^{2})
- Floors: 3
- Website: pavilionintheparkar.com

Pavilion in the Park is a mixed-use enclosed mall with upscale shopping located in Little Rock, Arkansas. Tenants include B. Barnett, a local luxury women's boutique; Baumans Fine Men's Clothing, a local upscale men's store; and Trio's Restaurant, a local eatery offering Southern comfort cuisine.

== History ==
Pavilion in the Park was built in 1985 by Arkansan cardiologist C.D. Williams and David Jones at the cost of $7.8 million as an upscale shopping center. The structure was designed by Little Rock-based Polk Stanley Yeary Architects and constructed by Little Rock-based Kinco Constructors. The center found itself with just 64 percent occupancy in 1988 and dropped to 54 percent occupancy in 1989 after losing major national tenants, including Laura Ashley and Bombay Company, to the newly renovated Park Plaza Mall. Pavilion in the Park had a pretentious reputation that kept some customers away, according to the manager of the center in 1991, saying, "when I moved here, people told me I couldn't shop here, and they didn't even know what I made. It had that reputation." A foreclosure suit was filed in 1989 and was battled for nearly two years until it was dismissed in 1990. In the early 1990s, Pavilion in the Park started accepting business offices as tenants and signed new retail tenants, such as a luxury men's store and a furrier. Non-retail tenants added at Pavilion in the Park include Prince Plastic Surgery and Legacy Spine and Neurological Specialists. By 1991, Pavilion in the Park had 75 percent occupancy, and in 2022, the center was noted to be 100 percent occupied.

In the late 1980s, B. Barnett, a local luxury women's boutique founded in 1973, opened at Pavilion in the Park. Baumans Fine Men's Clothing, a local upscale men's store established in 1919, opened its second location at Pavilion in the Park in 1993. In the 1990s, Baumans closed its other location, located on Main Street, and expanded its footprint at Pavilion in the Park. Both Baumans and B. Barnett are still currently located at the Pavilion in the Park.

In 2022, Little Rock-based Flake and Company, who was involved in Pavilion in the Park in the 1980s, purchased the mall for $8.85 million. The new owners stated intent to revitalize the center's glass atrium and use it to host community events.

On March 31, 2023, Pavilion in the Park sustained major damage from a high end EF3 tornado.

== See also ==
- Park Plaza Mall, an enclosed shopping mall in Little Rock
- The Promenade at Chenal, an open-air lifestyle center in Little Rock
- Outlets of Little Rock, an open-air outlet mall in Little Rock
- McCain Mall, an enclosed shopping mall in North Little Rock, Arkansas
