= Park Plaza Mall =

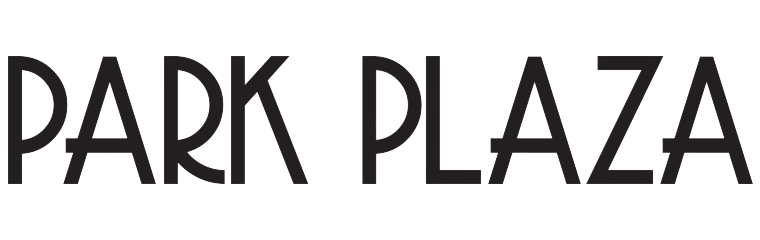

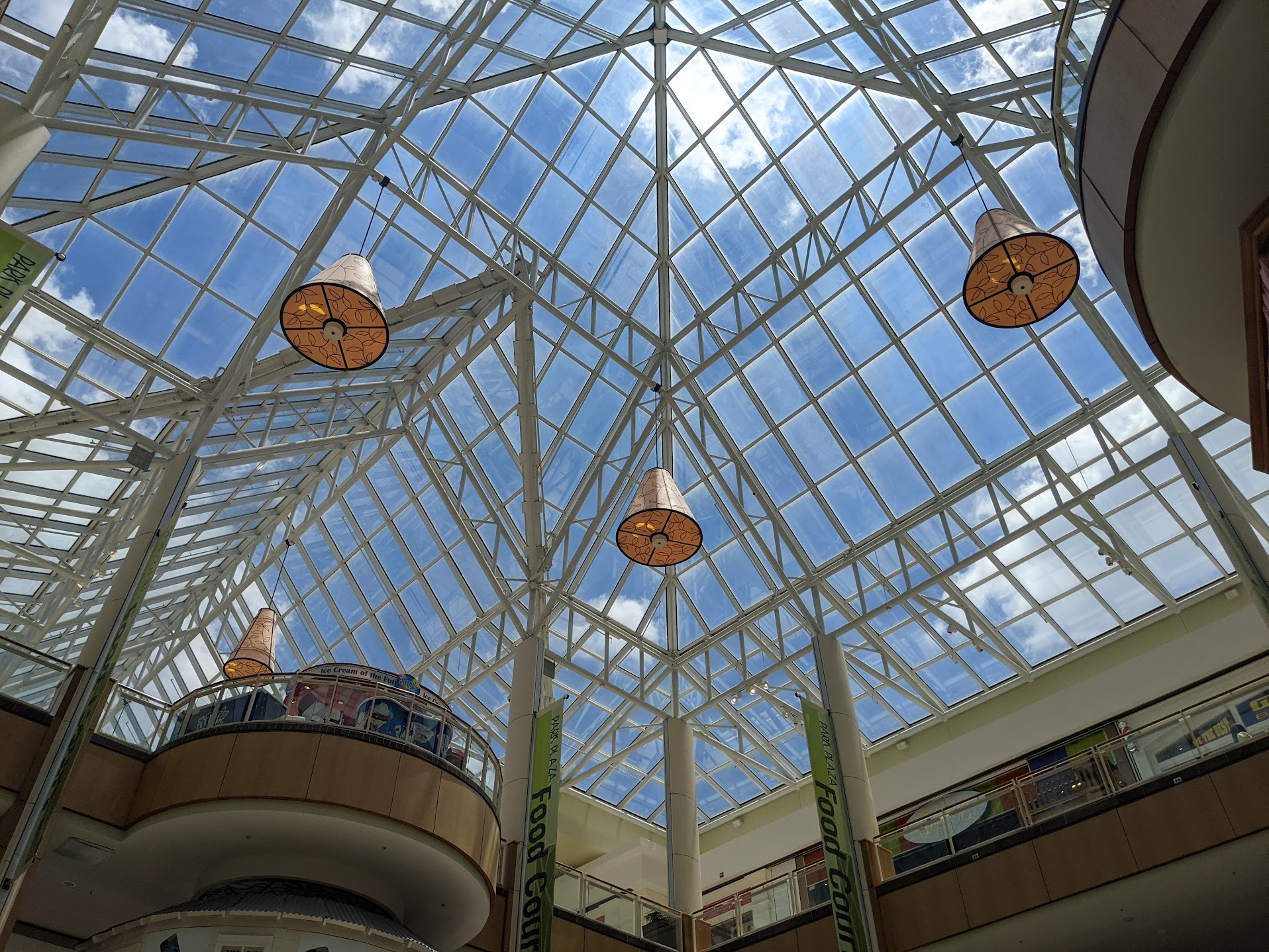
- View of Skylight from Main Court, June 2021
- Location: Little Rock, Arkansas, United States
- Coordinates: 34.7536°N 92.3432°W
- Address: 6000 W Markham St
- Opened: 1960
- Developer: Elbert Fausett
- Manager: JLL
- Owner: Second Horizon Capital
- Num. of stores: 65+
- Num. of anchor tenants: 2
- Floor area: 545,800 sq ft (50,706.5 m^{2})
- Floors: 3
- Public transit: Rock Region Metro Bus Route 5
- Website: parkplazamall.com

Park Plaza Mall is an enclosed shopping mall located in the Midtown neighborhood of Little Rock, Arkansas. Originally opened in 1960 as Park Plaza Shopping Center, an open-air shopping center, the shopping center is home to two Dillard's flagship stores and merchants including H&M, Talbots, and American Eagle, Buckle, Bath & Body Works, Pandora and more. The structure contains 545,800 square feet (50,710 m^{2}) of retail space, although Dillard's owns 284,165 square feet (26,399.8 m^{2}) of that area for its flagship stores.

== History ==
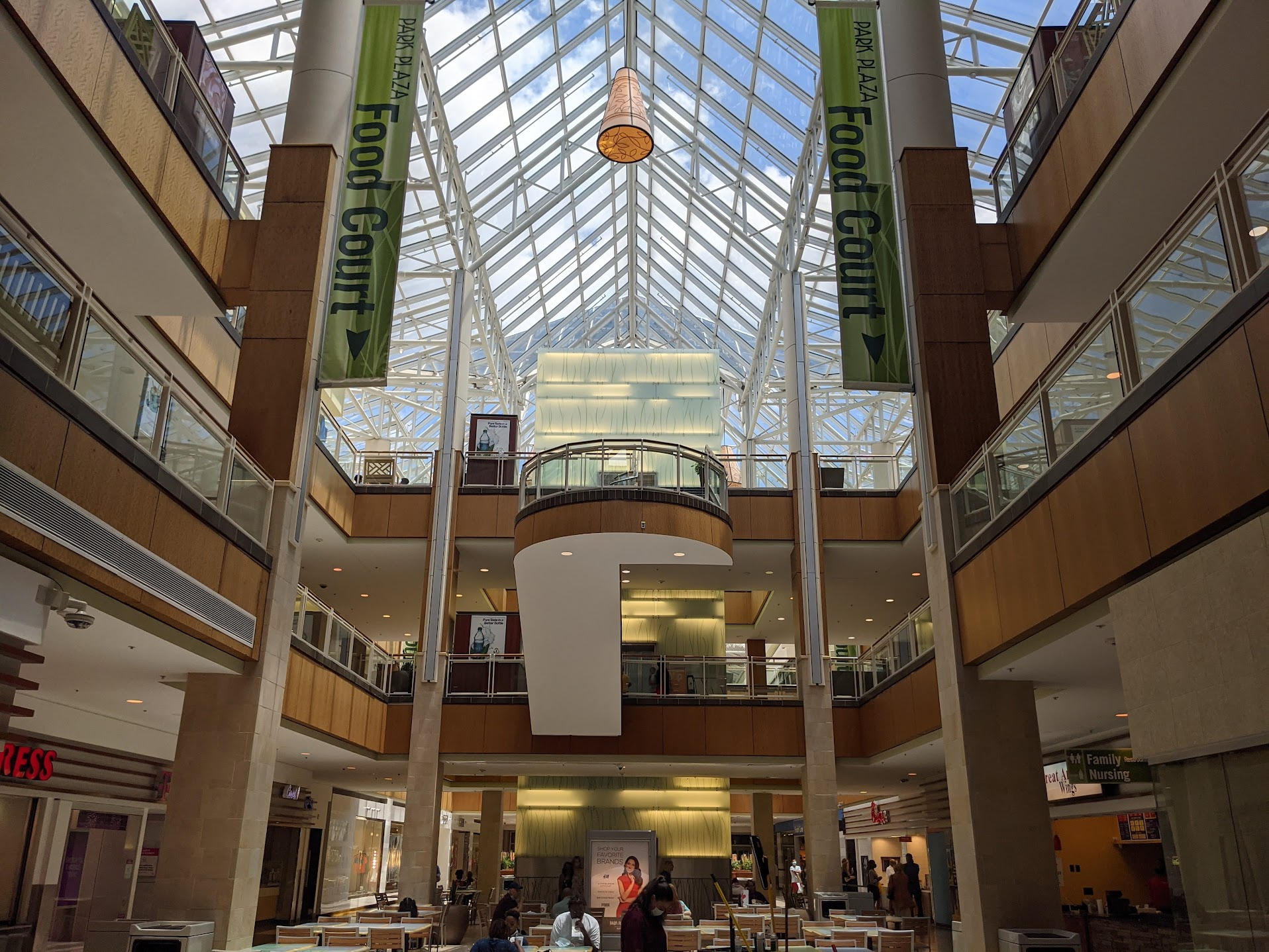
Food Court View of Atrium, June 2021

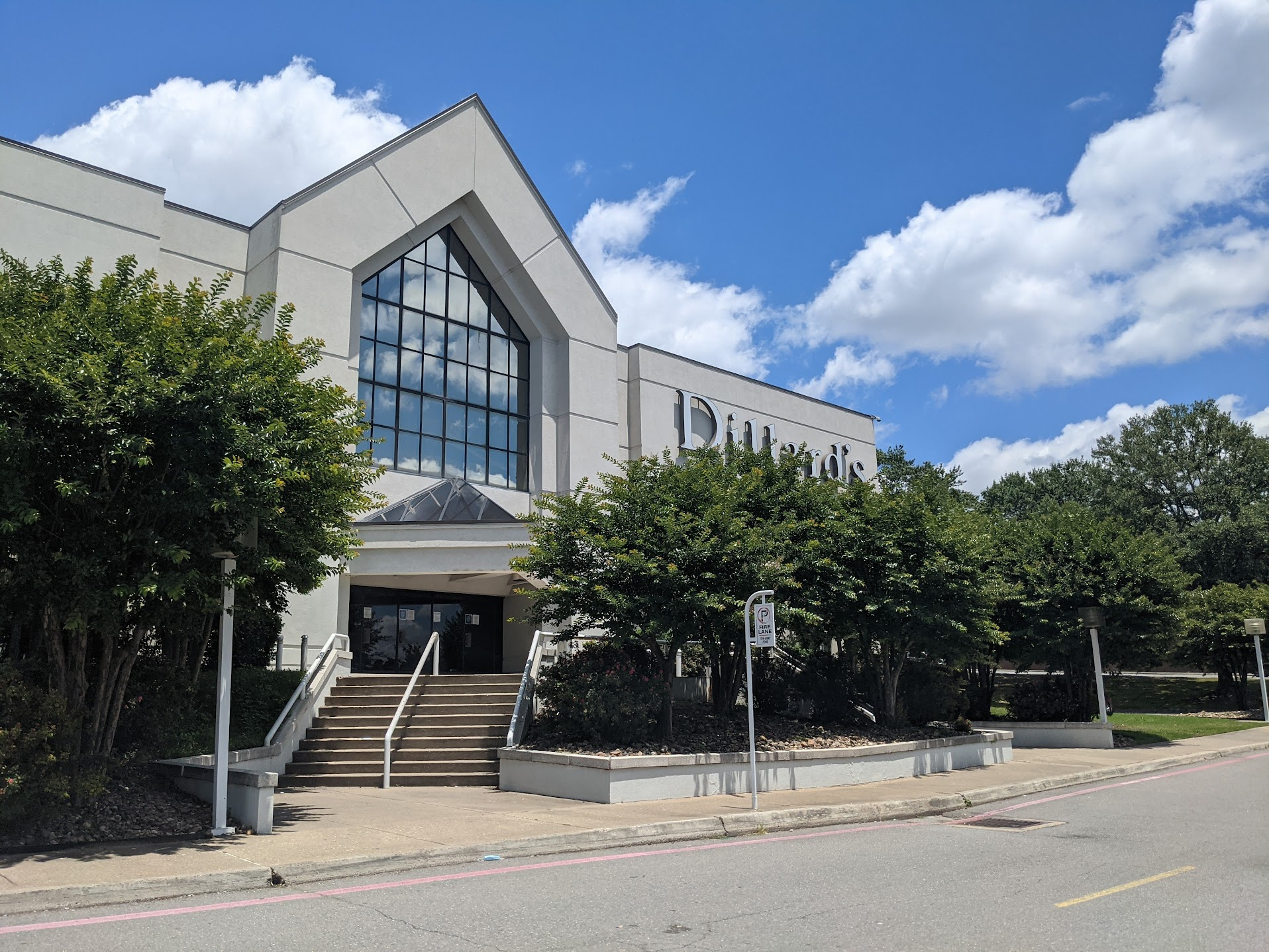
Dillard's East, June 2021

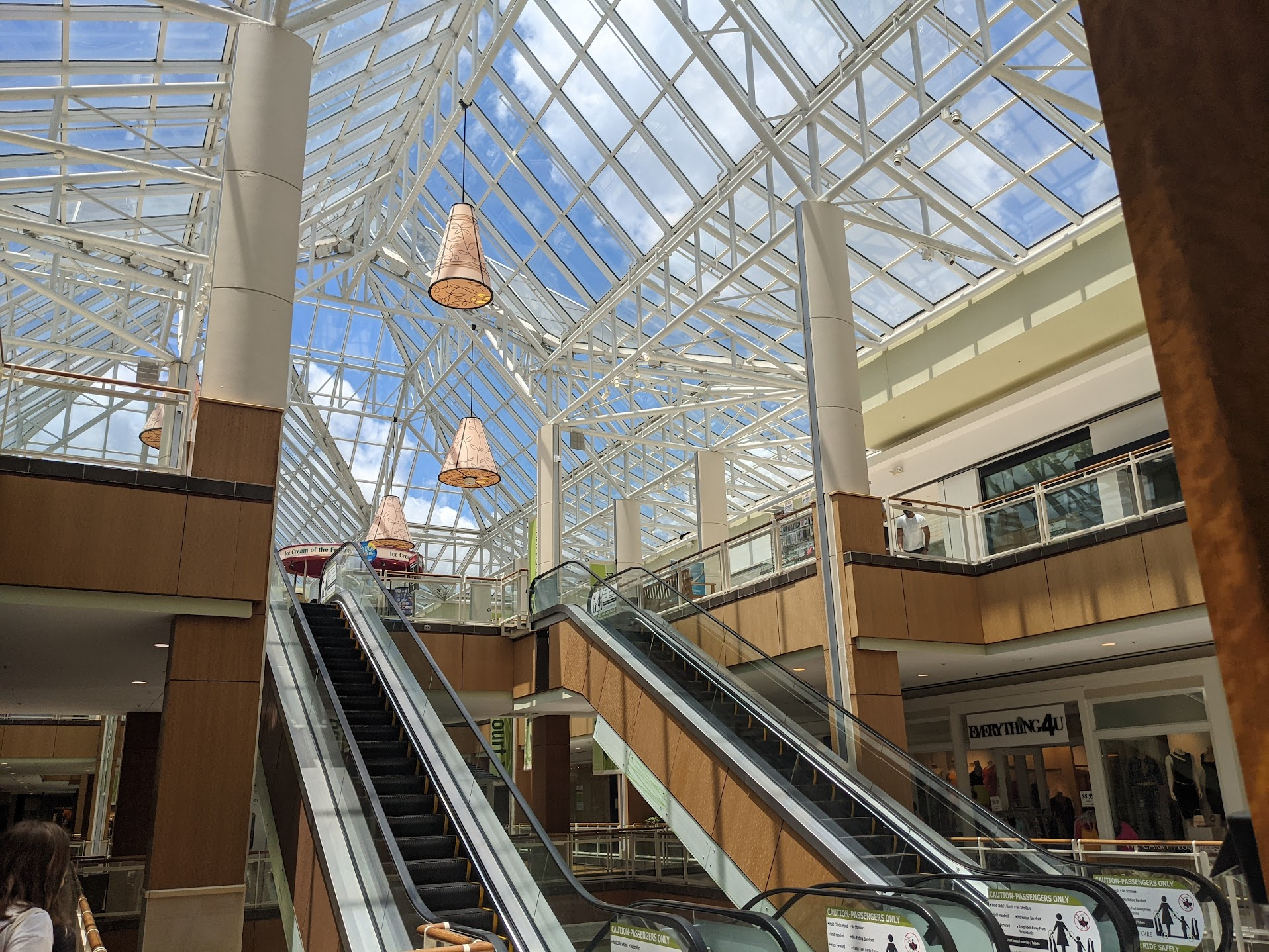
2nd Level, June 2021

Upon opening in 1960, Park Plaza was considered the first major shopping center in West Little Rock (now called Midtown, and today's West Little Rock is further west) and was eventually blamed for the exodus of retail stores from downtown Little Rock. Park Plaza Shopping Center, as it was originally named, consisted of retail stores, a grocery store, a bowling alley, and a cafeteria. In 1963, Gus Blass, a defunct downtown Little Rock department store founded in the 1860s, announced plans to build a store at Park Plaza. Its Park Plaza location opened in 1965, becoming the first large store from downtown Little Rock with a presence at Park Plaza. The site of the Gus Blass downtown location still stands today and is registered on the National Register of Historic Places. In 1964, Gus Blass was sold to Little Rock-based Dillard's; in 1967, the Park Plaza Gus Blass was rebranded as Pfeifer-Blass, and in 1974, it finally became Dillard's. Dillard's remains at Park Plaza today with two separate stores at the mall: Dillard's East and Dillard's West; the two locations serve as company flagship locations.

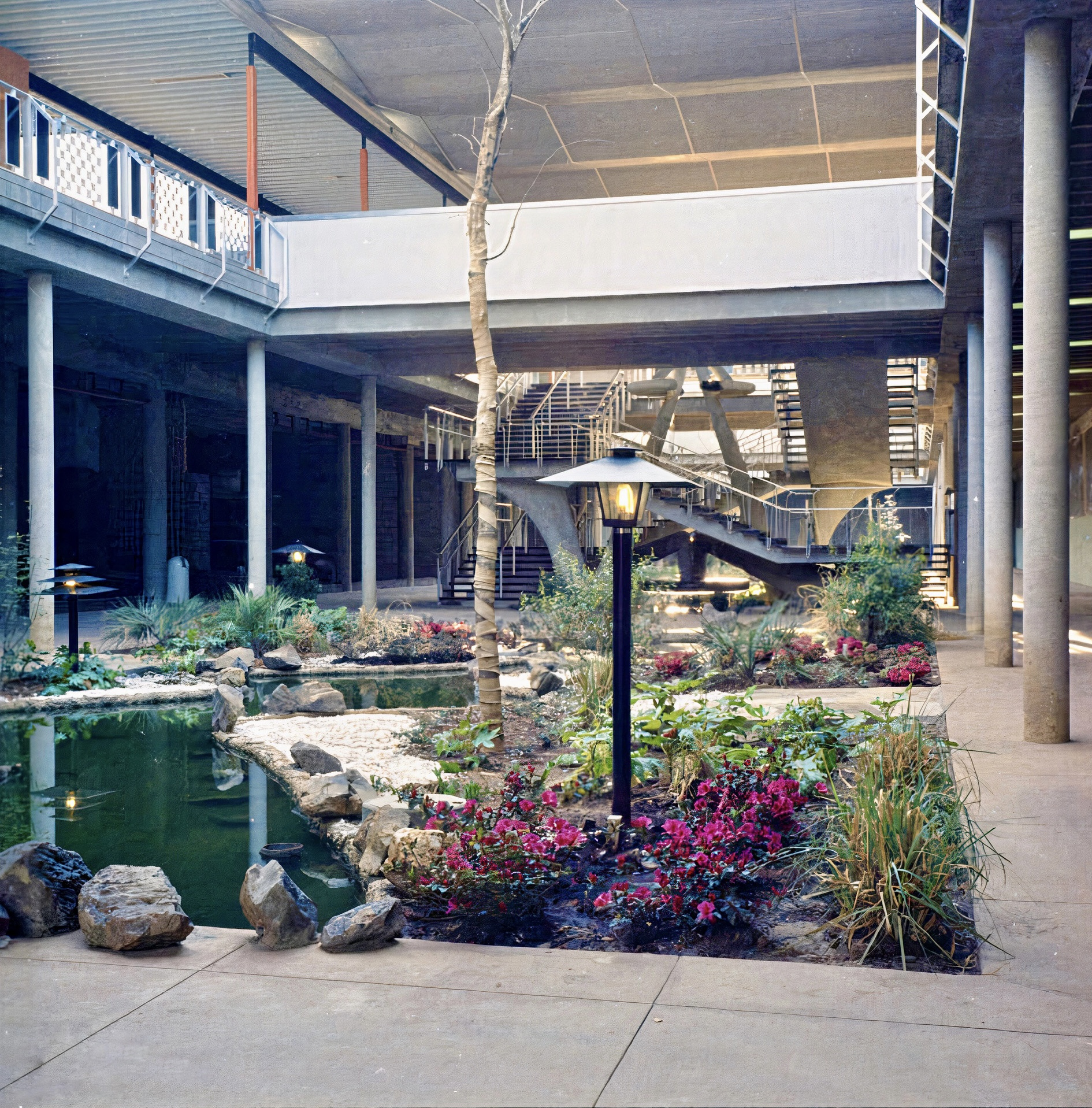
Park Plaza Shopping Center in April 1961 before its conversion to an enclosed shopping mall

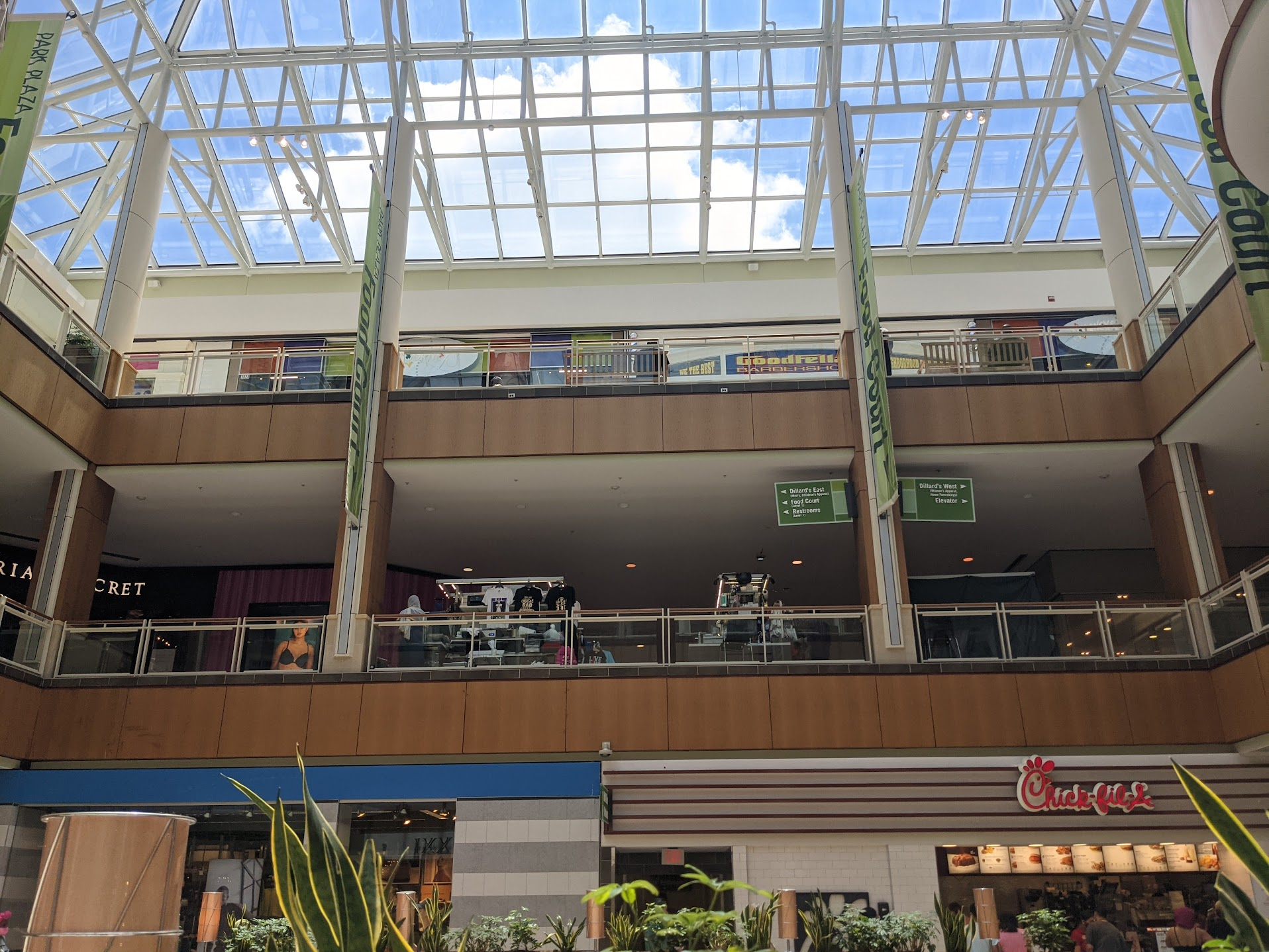
Center Court, June 2021

In 1967, the enclosed, "revolutionary" University Mall opened one block south of Park Plaza Shopping Center. Just as Park Plaza had caused retail stores to migrate from downtown Little Rock to its location, University Mall caused a migration from Park Plaza down the street to the new, enclosed, and air-conditioned University Mall. For about 20 years, Park Plaza struggled as University Mall established itself as the more desirable shopping location in Little Rock. The University Mall went through two renovations, including adding an additional story to the structure, reaching a size of 535,000 square feet (49,700 m^{2}). In response, Park Plaza Shopping Center temporarily closed in 1987 to undergo $20 million in renovations and reopened in 1988 as Park Plaza Mall, a three-story enclosed mall with 680,000 square feet (63,000 m^{2}) and a movie theater. University Mall was eventually demolished in 2007.

Park Plaza Mall's standing was threatened throughout the 1990s and early 2000s, with Simon Property Group, owner of the University Mall, planning to build Summit Mall: a 1,100,000-square-foot (100,000 m^{2}) mall with three adjacent six-story office buildings, two restaurants, and a 10-story, 250-room hotel. The proposed mall was to be located in West Little Rock and was the focus of controversy and litigation, as it was predicted cause economic decline to Midtown. Park Plaza Mall was expected to be in turmoil had Summit Mall been built, as Dillard's, Park Plaza's sole anchor, had committed to being an anchor tenant at Summit Mall. Plans for Summit Mall collapsed in 2004 amid a zoning battle and the prospect of a city referendum on the deal. With the fate of Park Plaza Mall secure, mall owners First Union Real Estate Equity and Mortgage Investments sold Park Plaza to CBL Properties of Chattanooga, Tennessee, for $77.5 million later that year.

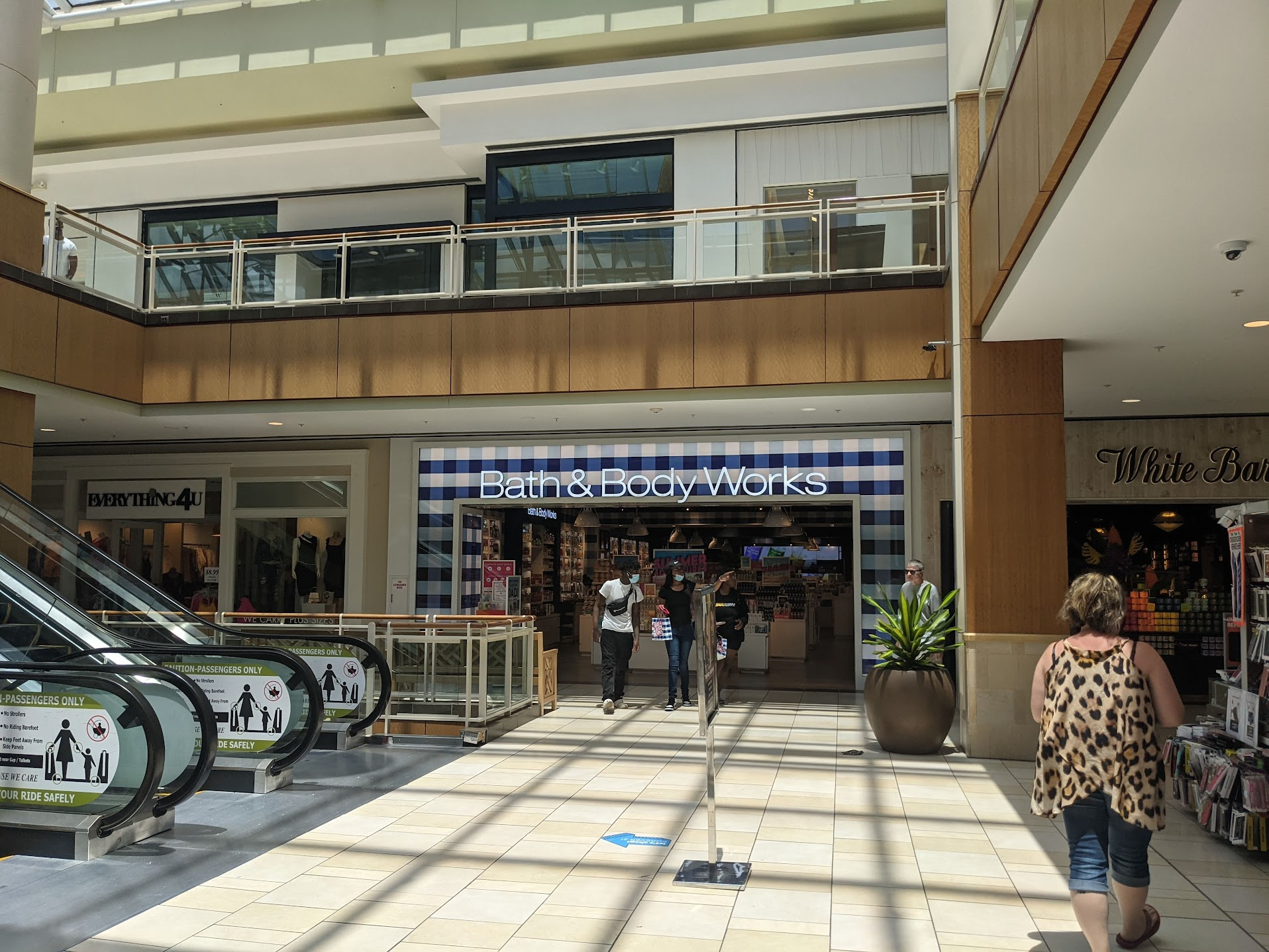
Bath & Body Works, June 2021

In 2021, the mall went into foreclosure due to a $99 million loan originating in 2011. The owners of the mall at the time, CBL Properties, claimed they did not earn enough income to afford the required payments. The trustee for the holders of the original loan against the mall, Deutsche Bank, took ownership of the mall after a Pulaski County circuit judge granted an $86.2 million judgment against CBL and granted immediate possession of the mall to Deutsche. Shortly after, Deutsche was the sole bidder of $100,000 at the mall's foreclosure auction. Deutsche operated the mall under the LLC The Woodmont Company and marketed Park Plaza as "the premier shopping center in Little Rock."

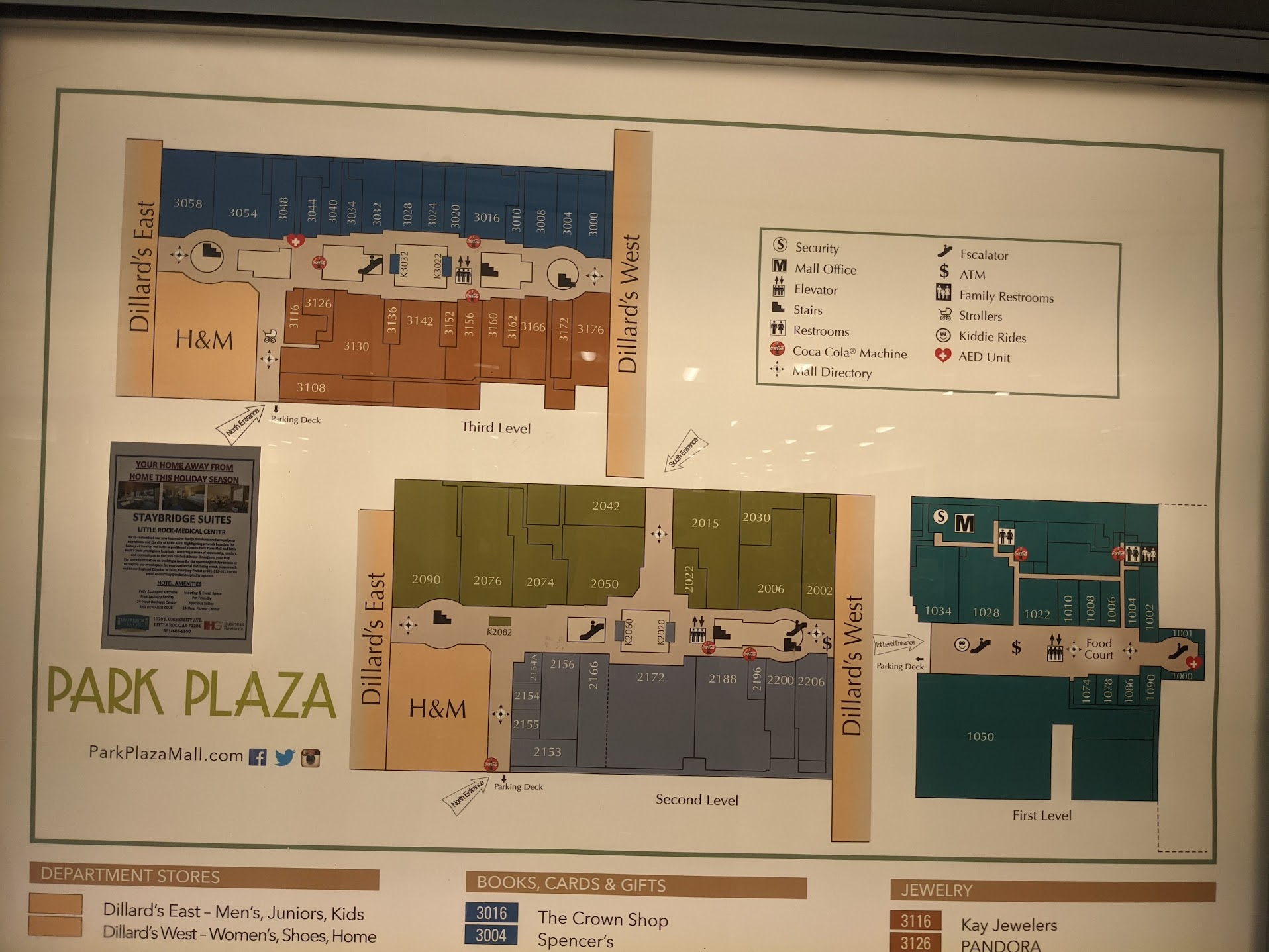
Mall Directory, June 2021

In March 2023, Florida-based investment company, Second Horizon Capital, announced it purchased the property with plans for a "significant investment" to revitalize the mall. The company chose JLL as the mall's new management.

The two Dillard's locations at Park Plaza has not been included in the mall's ownership changes throughout the years, as Dillard's owns its retail spaces, the lots they sit on, and its adjacent parking structure.

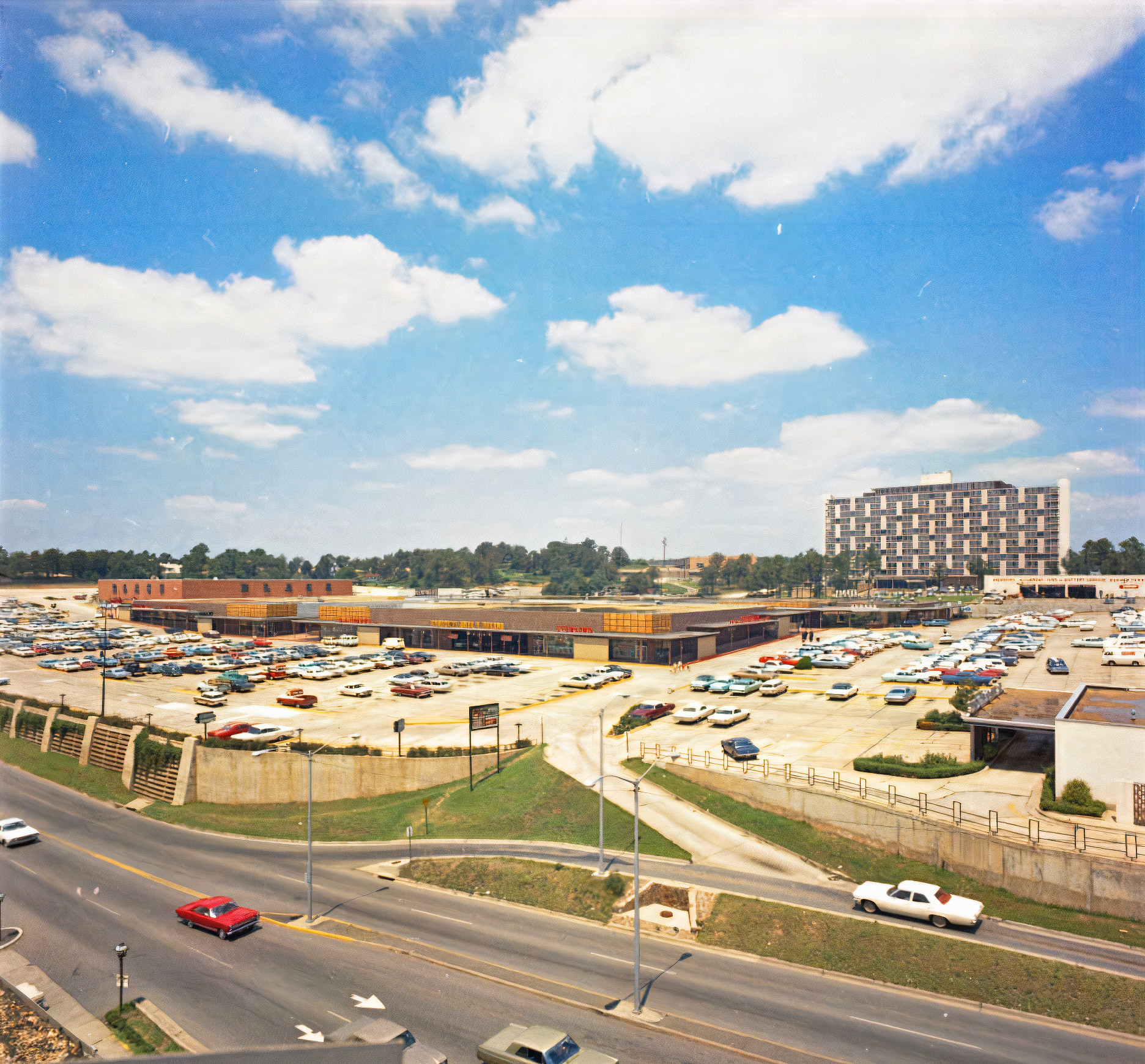
The exterior of Park Plaza Mall in 1966

== See also ==
- Pavilion in the Park, an enclosed mixed-space retail and office center in Little Rock
- The Promenade at Chenal, an open-air lifestyle center in Little Rock
- Outlets of Little Rock, an open-air outlet mall in Little Rock
- McCain Mall, an enclosed shopping mall in North Little Rock, Arkansas
