= The Promenade at Chenal =

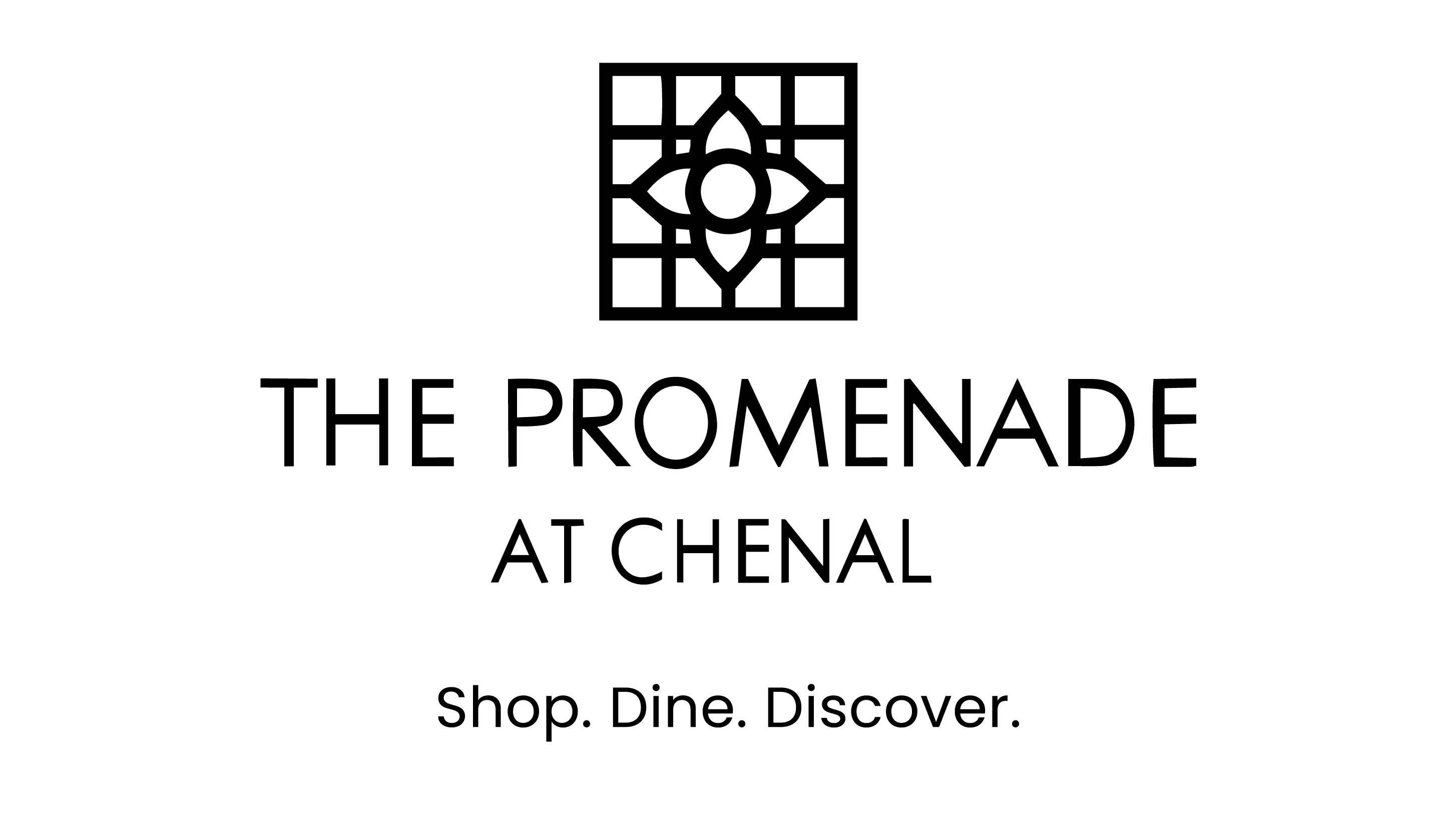
- Location: Little Rock, Arkansas, United States
- Coordinates: 34°46′0.48″N 92°27′32.04″W
- Address: 17711 Chenal Parkway
- Opened: May 2008
- Developer: RED Development, LLC
- Manager: Moses Tucker Partners
- Architect: The Preston Partnership
- Num. of stores: 44
- Floor area: 340,000 square feet (32,000 m^{2})
- Floors: 1
- Parking: 3,152
- Website: chenalshopping.com

The Promenade at Chenal (/ʃɪˈnɔːl/ shin-AWL) is an upscale, open-air lifestyle center located in Little Rock, Arkansas, at the corner of Chenal Parkway and Rahling Road in Chenal Valley. The Promenade displays French Gothic architecture and was designed to replicate a nostalgic Main Street shopping district. The center features an IMAX theater, Lululemon, Kendra Scott, Sephora, Anthropologie, the state's only Apple Store location, and local merchants among its tenants.

== History ==
In April 2004, RED Development, LLC announced intent to purchase 38 acres from Deltic Timber Corporation (now PotlatchDeltic) to develop the Promenade in west Little Rock's Chenal Valley. The sale between the two parties was closed in September 2006 and construction began in 2007. The Promenade at Chenal was completed in May 2008, with final construction costing $79 million.

The Promenade was originally planned to be a 485,000 square feet (45,100 m^{2}) center anchored by Dillard's, but due to construction delays, Dillard's did not become a tenant at the Promenade. Instead, the Promenade consists of 340,000 square feet (32,000 m^{2}) and Dillard's remains at its flagship location in Park Plaza Mall, further east in Midtown. Original tenants at the Promenade included the state's first IMAX theater and the state's first J. Crew.

In August 2011, Apple opened its first Apple Store location in the state at the Promenade. As of 2022, the Little Rock location is the only Apple Store location in Arkansas. In 2018, AMC Theatres took ownership of the Promenade's Chenal 9 IMAX theater and proceeded with $3 million of renovations to the venue. AMC upgraded the theater's seats and speakers, as well as expanded its concessions.

In December 2019, a non-disclosed private group based out of the Northeast United States announced they had purchased the Promenade and will retain the local group Moses Tucker Partners to manage the site. The next month, Arkasnsas Democrat-Gazette reported the Promenade exchanged owners for $10 cash and other unspecified considerations "in lieu of foreclosure."

Summer of 2021 saw Urban Outfitters open its first Arkansas location at the Promenade. Sullivans Steakhouse opened a Little Rock location at the Promenade in April 2022, with Executive Chef Michael Brown. Arkansas-based and family-run jeweler, Sissy's Log Cabin, chose the Promenade for its sixth location, which opened in July 2022.

== See also ==
- Park Plaza Mall, an enclosed shopping mall in Little Rock
- Pavilion in the Park, an enclosed mixed-space retail and office center in Little Rock
- Outlets of Little Rock, an open-air outlet mall in Little Rock
- McCain Mall, an enclosed shopping mall in North Little Rock, Arkansas
