= Outlets of Little Rock =

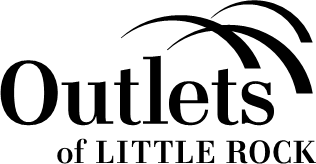

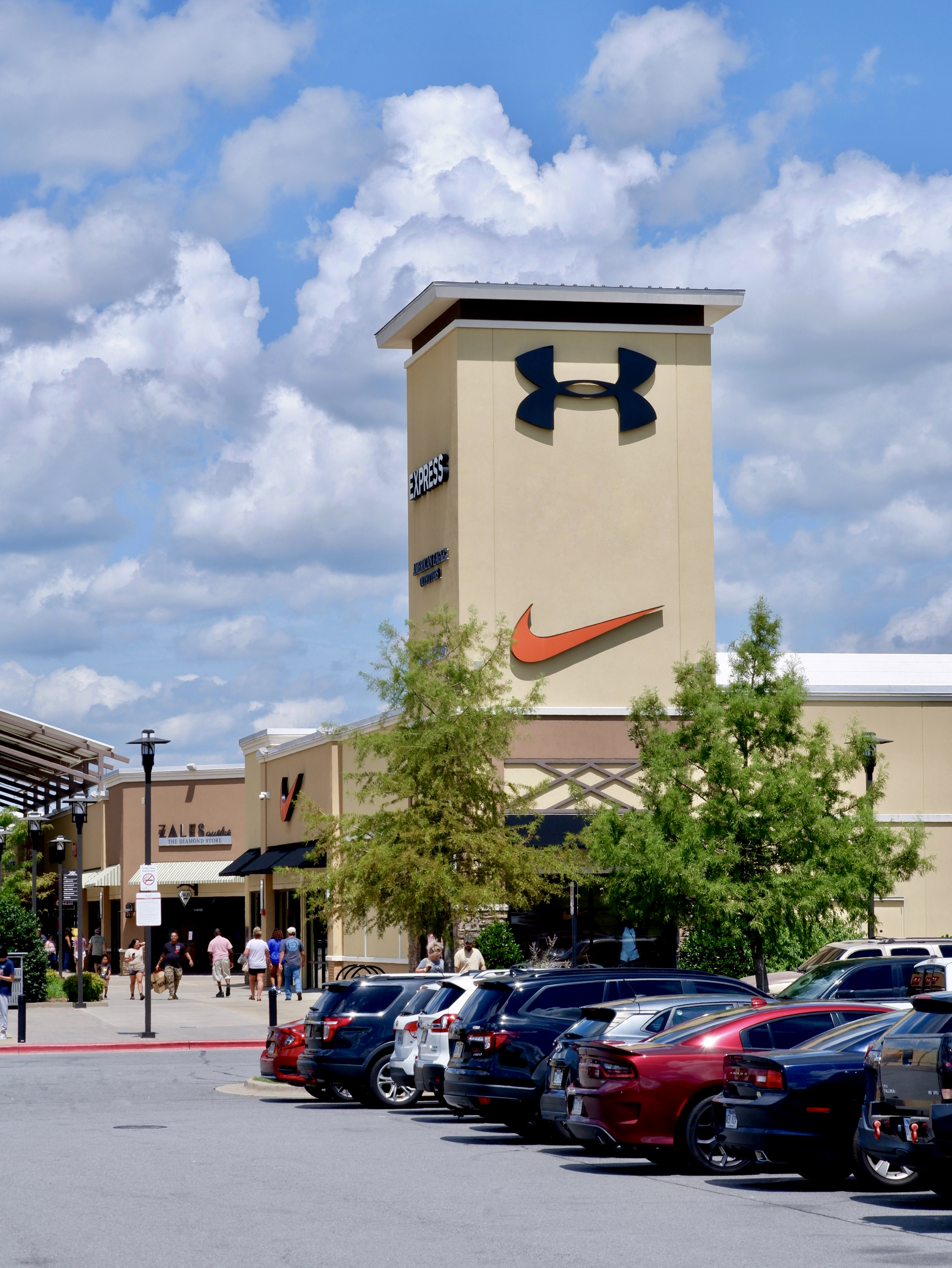
- Location: Little Rock, Arkansas, United States
- Coordinates: 34°39′37.08″N 92°24′25.2″W
- Address: 11201 Bass Pro Parkway
- Opened: October 16, 2015
- Developer: NEA Development
- Owner: 4th Dimension Properties
- Architect: Allevato Architects
- Num. of stores: 53
- Floor area: 365,104 sq ft (33,919.3 m^{2})
- Floors: 1
- Public transit: Rock Region Metro Bus Route 23
- Website: outletsoflittlerock.com

Outlets of Little Rock is a 365,000-square-foot (33,900 m^{2}) open-air shopping mall in Little Rock, Arkansas, at the intersection of Interstate 30 and Interstate 430. The shopping center opened in 2015 as the state's first outlet mall. Adjacent attractions include Dave & Buster's and Bass Pro Shops. Tenants include Banana Republic Factory Store, Cole Haan Outlet, Nike Factory Store, and Le Creuset Outlet Store.

== History ==
Plans to construct various shopping centers in the location where Outlets of Little Rock stands today date as far back as the early 1950s, but plans kept falling through. In the 1980s, a proposed shopping mall, Otter Creek Mall, was set to be constructed in the location, but due to legal and financial issues, construction never began. The 2012 announcement of Bass Pro Shops's first store in Arkansas, located adjacent to the future Outlets of Little Rock site, breathed new life into plans for a shopping center in the location.

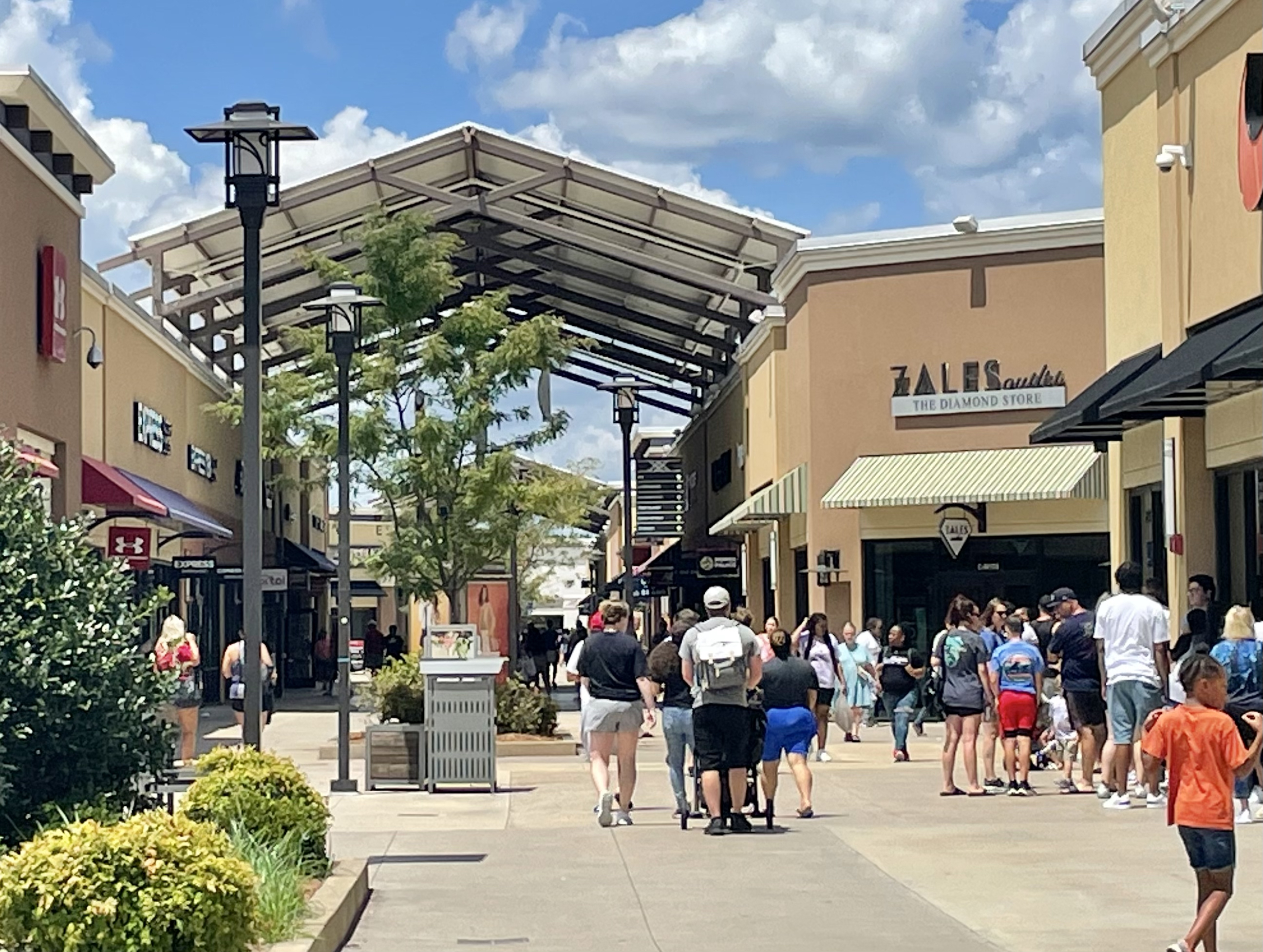
Shoppers at Outlets of Little Rock in April 2022

Outlets of Little Rock's construction began in 2015 and was designed in the "prairie style" seen throughout Little Rock, with architects using buildings in the River Market District as inspiration. The outlet mall was designed to evoke a park-like ambiance, complete with seating, gathering areas, and Arkansas-native landscaping.

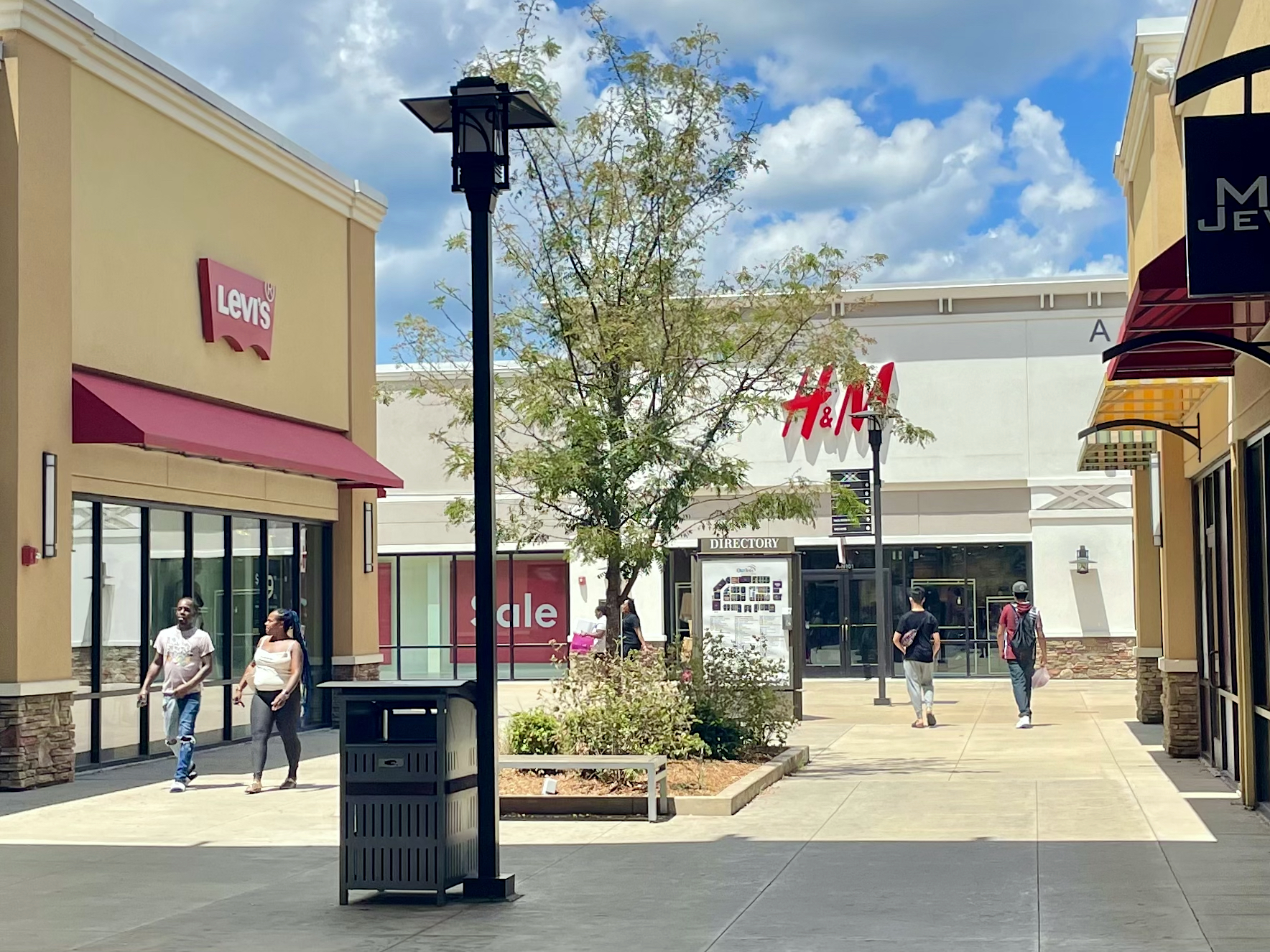
Levi's and H&M at Outlets of Little Rock

Outlets of Little Rock was sold by its original owner, NEA Development, in December 2019 in a $10 million transaction to Kohan Retail Investment Group. The property was assessed by the county for $61 million and carried a $68 million loan by NEA, which was released in consideration of payment for a portion of NEA's indebtedness.

In 2023, Michaels opened a new concept store design at the mall. The design is more sleek and simple compared to their other locations, with an emphasis on customers buying merchandise online to pick up in-store.

=== 2021 murder ===
In 2021, a 22-year-old man was fatally shot in the back of the head while waiting with his girlfriend, sister, and children to get on a carnival ride by Outlets of Little Rock. Five days after the shooting, a 16-year-old suspect was detained by U.S. Marshals. Detectives then obtained an arrest warrant for capital murder and served it to the suspect at Pulaski County Jail. Police collected video evidence from various sources, including a Snapchat video recorded atop a Ferris wheel at the carnival, showing a man wearing a black puffy jacket extending his arm behind the victim. Gunshots were heard on the video, followed by the man in the puffy jacket fleeing the scene. A jacket matching the description was found by police at the suspect's home. The suspect's bail was set at $1 million. As of April 2022, the now-17-year-old suspect is awaiting decision on if he will be tried as an adult.

== See also ==
- Park Plaza Mall, an enclosed shopping mall in Little Rock
- Pavilion in the Park, an enclosed mixed-space retail and office center in Little Rock
- The Promenade at Chenal, an open-air lifestyle center in Little Rock
- McCain Mall, an enclosed shopping mall in North Little Rock, Arkansas
