= University Peak =

University Peak may refer to:

- University Peak (Alaska) in Alaska, USA
- University Peak (California) in California, USA
- University Peak (Antarctica)
