= University Mall (Arkansas) =

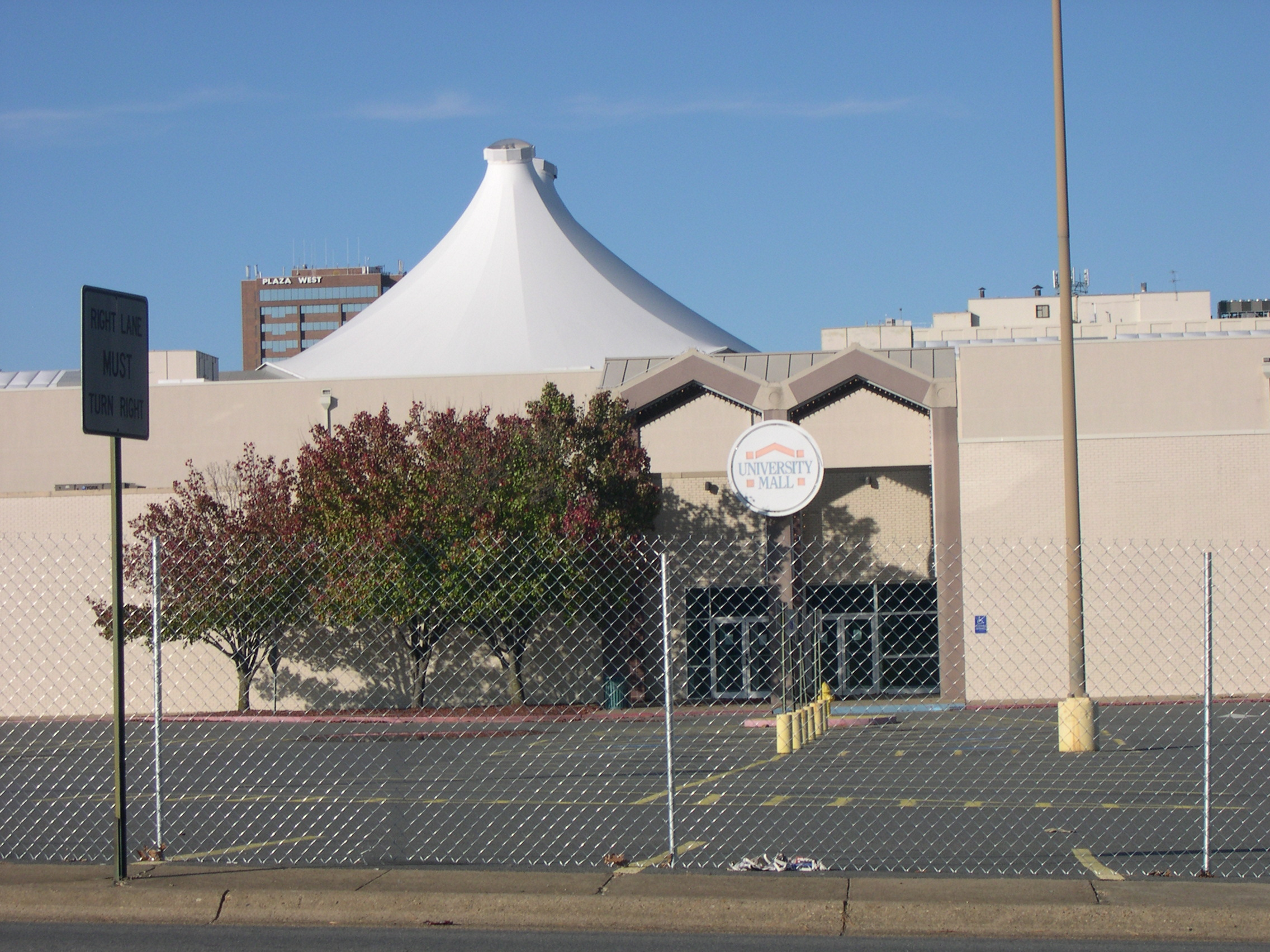
- South entrance shortly before demolition
- Location: Little Rock, Arkansas, United States
- Coordinates: 34°45′02″N 92°20′44″W
- Opened: 1967
- Closed: October 27, 2007
- Demolished: early 2008
- Developer: Melvin Simon & Associates
- Manager: Strode Property Company
- Owner: Jim Strode
- Num. of stores: 0 (70 at its peak)
- Num. of anchor tenants: 0 (3 at its peak)
- Floor area: 697,000 sq ft (64,800 m^{2}).
- Floors: 2
- Parking: 2,500

University Mall, originally The Mall, is a defunct shopping center in Little Rock, Arkansas, which operated for approximately 40 years, from 1967 until 2007. When it closed, University Mall was the oldest enclosed shopping center in the Little Rock metropolitan area. Located in the central part of Little Rock, the site is situated along South University Avenue, north of the University of Arkansas at Little Rock and Interstate 630. The mall was managed by Indianapolis-based Simon Property Group.

University Mall was initially a success, but its popularity declined as new retail outlets in Little Rock drew customers away. The departure of its anchor stores, beginning with the bankruptcy of Montgomery Ward in 2001, left more than half of the mall empty. Throughout the 1990s, the mall steadily declined as retailers and customers left. Due to the waning popularity and litigation involving the deterioration of the building, the mall was sold in 2007 to Strode Property Company, and the remaining few tenants were told to vacate. Demolition began for the primary structure in early 2018. Prior to this, associated buildings were razed beginning in December 2017, starting with the former Montgomery Ward auto center, as well as the former JCPenney auto center, which had been used several years as an automotive maintenance facility for the City of Little Rock.

== History ==
=== Development ===
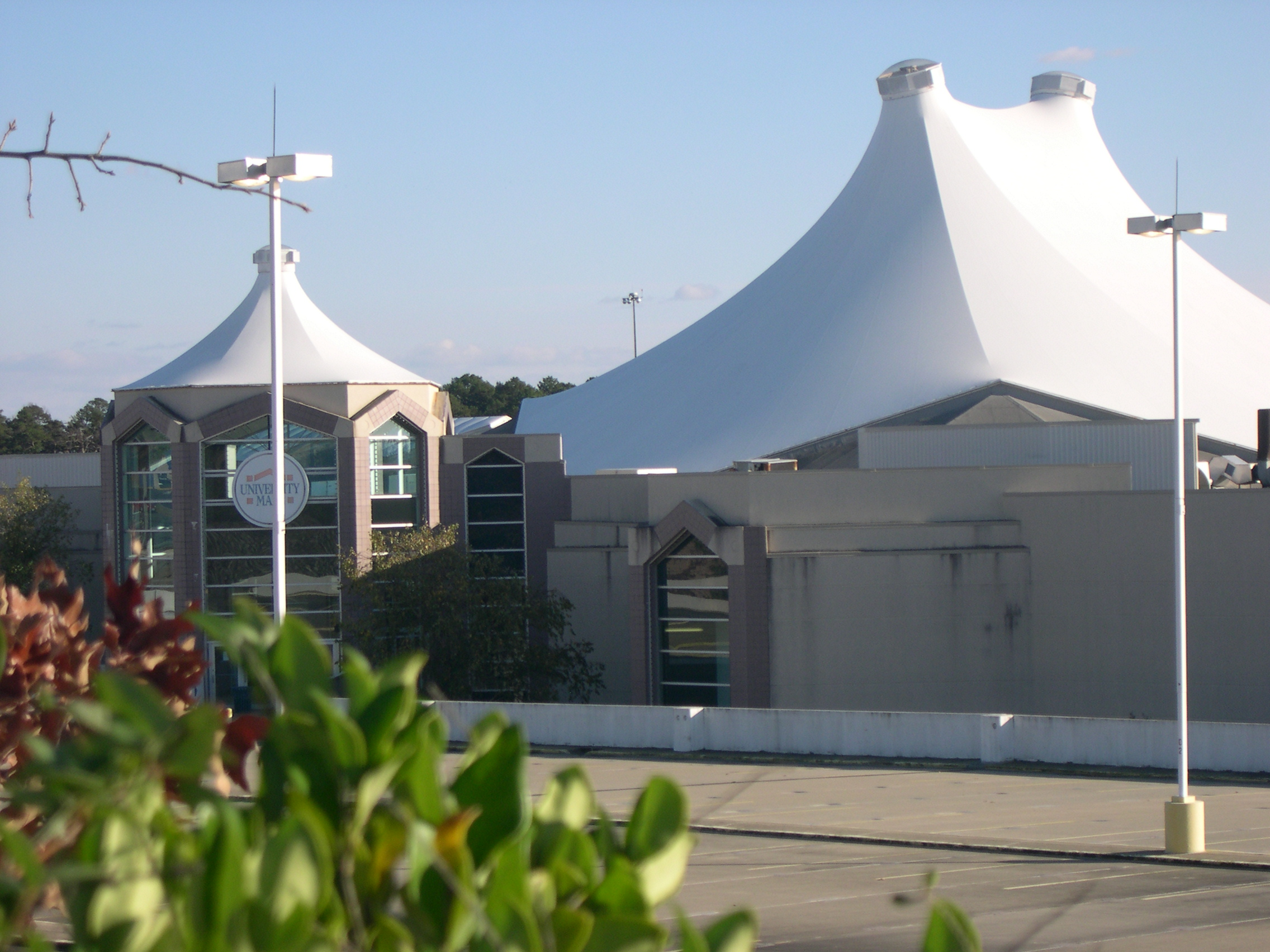
North entrance shortly before demolition

The developer was Melvin Simon & Associates, an Indianapolis-based real estate developer and management company, now known as Simon Property Group Inc. This was the company's first venture in Arkansas; however, they had already built around 40 other shopping centers in the United States. The landowners were stockholders in a corporation that was listed as Developers Inc. Developers Inc. included "Judge" William J. Smith, a prominent Little Rock Attorney and adviser to Gov. Orval E. Faubus. Smith's wife, daughter, and Son in Law Mr. and Mrs. William L. Patton, Jr. and John Cella of St. Louis who owned Oaklawn Jockey Club, the thoroughbred racetrack in Hot Springs, Arkansas. Developers Inc. dissolved a few months before the announcement of the mall. According to newspapers from the time stockholders of the former corporation became the owners of the mall property. George Cella and Bill Patton, children of the original corporation owners, were mentioned in the later litigation regarding the property that led to its closure and sale in 2007.

Smith told a reporter that he got the idea for the mall when he was driving down University Avenue in the 1950s, when it was known as Hayes Street. He felt that it was a good buy and called John Cella and told him it would be a good investment for them. During the next 15 years, the two managed to acquire the surrounding 28 acres (110,000 m^{2}) for the mall site. This included a cemetery that was moved during construction. The acreage was leased to the Simon Property Group until 2026.

Plans for the mall were announced in 1965. Simon is quoted as saying that the site offered "the best potential he had ever seen" for a city the size of Little Rock. The mall complex comprised 565,000-square-foot (52,500 m^{2}) leasable square feet, the rest for parking of 2,500 cars, and was a single level structure when it opened. MM Cohn was the first major department store to sign a lease at the new mall. At the time, it was one of the three big locally owned department stores in downtown Little Rock. A few weeks later, Montgomery Ward and JCPenney announced that they too would build their own stores on the property. Montgomery Ward built a 136,000-square-foot (12,600 m^{2}) square foot store at the southeast corner of the mall; it marked a return of the national store to full-scale operation in Little Rock, where it had operated only a catalog store downtown for 11 years. The addition and a 37,000-square-foot (3,400 m^{2}) warehouse took up about 40 percent of the mall's square footage. The JCPenney store, at the west end of the mall, contained 160,000 square feet (15,000 m^{2}) and a free-standing auto center, making it the largest department store in the state.

=== 1975 and 1987 renovations ===
In 1975, the mall underwent cosmetic renovations and was renamed from simply The Mall to University Mall to diversify it from the new McCain Mall Simon was planning for North Little Rock. The mall's reopening was held in March of that year. News accounts state that special emphasis was placed on the mall's security program. University Mall drew thousands of shoppers yearly and was known for its holiday displays and programs. It became a favorite place for many walkers, including retirees and heart patients from St. Vincent Infirmary Medical Center, located just across University Avenue.

In October 1987, Simon announced $15 million in expansion and renovations of the mall, handled by Vratsinas Construction Co. of Tulsa, Oklahoma; construction started in 1988, ending about a year later. The expansion added 70,000 square feet (6,500 m^{2}) to the existing 565,000 square feet (52,500 m^{2}) structure. Several existing tenants also said they would spend another $3 million on remodeling and expansion. MM Cohn updated its store and added a mall entrance to its second floor. JCPenney store also enlarged its store at the mall. This expansion gave the mall its most distinctive feature, an unusual nine-story Teflon-coated tent-like structure towered over the new concourse, referred to as "the skylight" because it let so much light in. The concourse was expanded to two levels, connected by escalators and an elevator and a carousel as its centerpiece. The new upper level had a cantilevered walkway overlooking the bottom level and a 9,000-square-foot (840 m^{2}) food court. A multi-level parking garage was also built on the north side of the mall.

A grand four-day reopening was held in November 1988, with special guest Corbin Bernsen of the television show L.A. Law. An oversized electrical switch turned on the lights, signifying the reopening of the renovated mall. The mall had about 55 stores and was expecting eventually to house 70. It had 697,000 square feet (64,800 m^{2}) of leasable space; however, there was other retail activity in the city that would eventually affect University Mall: Herring Marathon Group Inc. of Dallas unveiled plans to convert the then-open-air Park Plaza shopping center into an enclosed mall directly across Markham Street, just north of University Mall. The Park Plaza shopping center was almost 30 years old at the time, and a landmark of the rapidly expanding West Little Rock area. Herring Marathon said that it would completely rebuild and enclose the total area, increasing it to 676,569 square feet (62,855.3 m^{2}) — including 25,000 square feet (2,300 m^{2}) of new retail area, plus a new 86,000-square-foot (8,000 m^{2}) Dillard's store anchoring the west end of Park Plaza. Builders estimated that the work would cost about $20 million. Renaissance Properties Ltd. of Little Rock, which had created the Main Street Mall in downtown Little Rock, announced its 22 initial tenants. For the next decade, University Mall still had plenty of business, but when the Main Street Mall succumbed to the effects of Little Rock's dying downtown, Park Plaza Mall across the street and McCain Mall in North Little Rock established themselves as Little Rock's preferred destinations to shop.

=== Decline ===
The first indications of decline at University Mall started appearing in the 1980s when tenants voiced concerns about remodeling and marketing efforts. Osco Drug began closing its stores nationwide, three in Little Rock alone in 1997. In 2001, Montgomery Ward went bankrupt and closed all its stores, leaving a two-story 140,900-square-foot (13,090 m^{2}) vacant building on the University Mall site. Shopping traffic dropped dramatically afterward and a steady stream of tenants began leaving the property. In the beginning of 2001, Simon Property said the occupancy of University Mall was at 95 percent. In April 2001, after the departure of Montgomery Ward, a report by the Urban Land Institute of Washington, D.C., said 40 percent of the mall was vacant. In 2004 the William L. Patton Jr. Family Limited Partnership of Arkansas and southern Real Estate and Financial Co. sued Simon Property Group Inc seeking an injunction forcing Simon to "undertake any and all actions necessary" to restore the mall to good conditions. The land owners said the entire mall was in a state of disrepair and neglect. They claimed that Simon's neglect to maintain the building had been driving away tenants for decades. A team of inspectors hired by the landowners to document the condition of the mall testified in 2005 that the vacant Montgomery Ward space was full of puddles, moldy ceiling tiles, and dead pigeons.

In December 2006, Simon presented a proposal to raze the mall and build a 625,000 to 675,000-square-foot (62,700 m^{2}) mixed use facility with retail, office, medical, and residential space at a news conference at the Little Rock Regional Chamber of Commerce building in Little Rock. The project would potentially include half a dozen individual structures, including a big-box retailer on the west, two high-rise multifamily residential buildings on the north and a multistory medical office complex on University Avenue. Paschall Strategic Communications, who was assisting with Simon's public relations campaign on the project, said that the negotiations were "going very well"; however these plans did not come to pass.

In June 2007, US District Judge Bill Wilson, Jr. ruled that Simon must make more than $7 million in repairs to get the mall into "good and tenable condition". Pending the sale of the property, the lawsuit was dropped.

=== Demolition ===
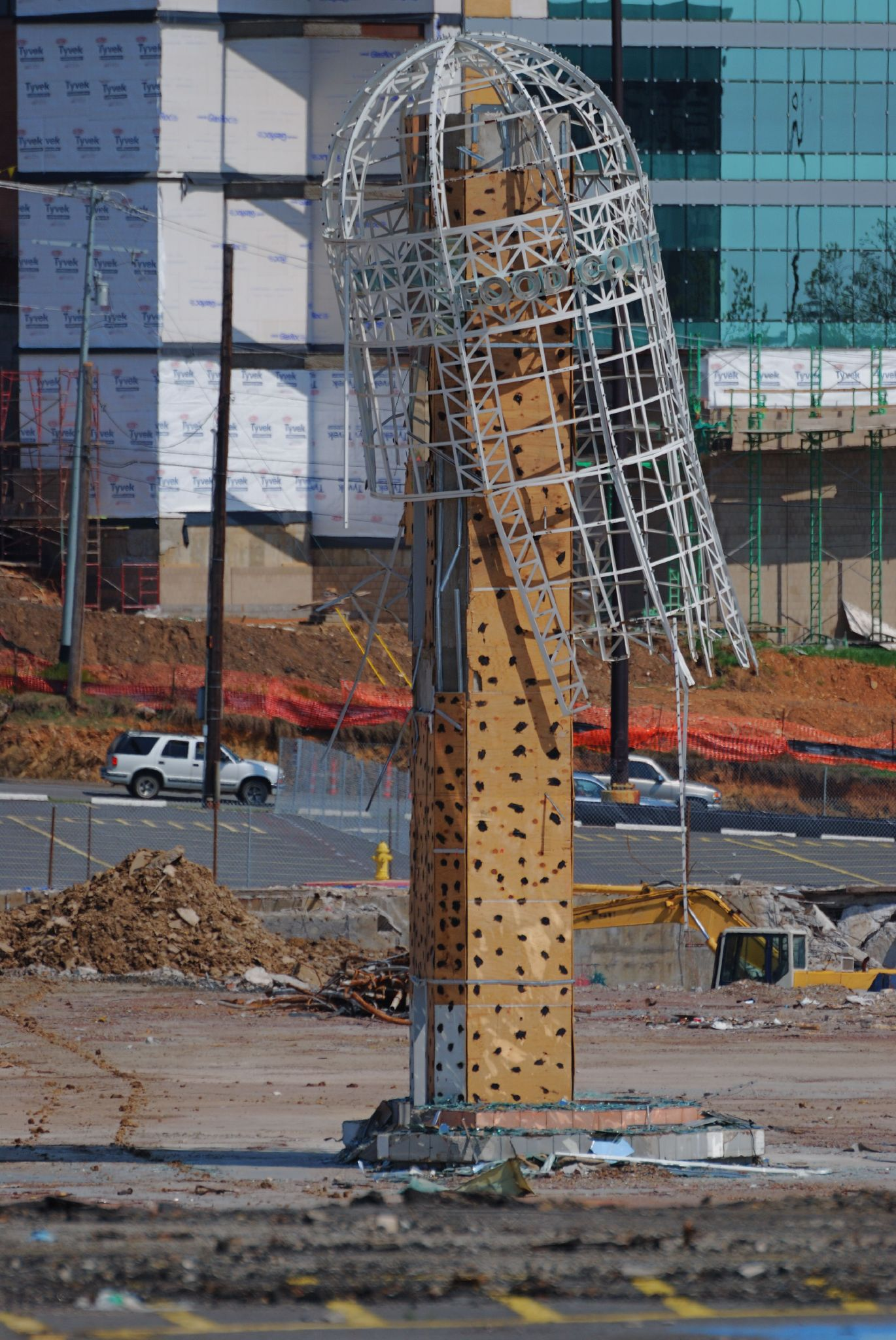
The elevator that was standing after demolition.

In October 2007, the William L. Patton, Jr. Family Limited Partnership and the Southern Real Estate & Financial Co. sold the 27 acres (110,000 m^{2}) beneath the mall and another acre with a convenience store on the corner of Markham and McKinley. Dallas-based Strode Property Company, led by Jim Strode, under the name of SPC Park Avenue Limited Partnership took out a loan for $27.65 million mortgage from Texas State Bank of Dallas and purchased the mall property for $21 million. The Simon management issued a deadline to the remaining tenants to vacate the mall by midnight on October 27. Strode reportedly planned to demolish the mall and build an open-air shopping center called "Park Avenue," similar to the Midtowne Shopping Center just to the northeast of the property. Strode said that after knocking down the old mall he planned to build a "lifestyle center" with a Main Street feel. The only parts of the old University Mall that would be integrated into Park Avenue were the parking deck, with a possible third level added, and the Montgomery Ward basement.

Saturday, October 27, 2007, was the last shopping day at the mall, although only two locally owned retailers remained open — Paul's Shoes and Nouri Dress Shop. (Both businesses relocated to Shackleford Crossings, on the property which had been slated as the long-disputed potential Summit Mall site.) The entire University Mall property was then surrounded by barricades following the exit of all tenants. Demolition of buildings in outer parcels began in December 2007, with demolition of the primary structure starting January 2008 and finishing up in March. Strode projected that its mixed-use Park Avenue development would open on the site in 2010.

Much of the mall's onetime footprint is now a parking area for the retailers within Park Avenue, while that development's Target and other business occupy areas that were previously used for University Mall parking along the perimeter of the property.
