= University Avenue =

University Avenue may refer to:

== Canada ==
- University Avenue (Edmonton), Alberta
- University Avenue (Toronto), Ontario
- University Avenue (Waterloo, Ontario), local name of Waterloo Regional Road 57
- University Avenue (Windsor, Ontario)

== Philippines ==
- University Avenue MRT station, Manila

== United States ==
- University Avenue (Berkeley), California
- University Avenue (Hammond, Louisiana), cosigned as Louisiana Highway 3234
- University Avenue (Lewisburg, Pennsylvania)
- University Avenue (Minneapolis–Saint Paul), Minnesota
- University Avenue (Provo, Utah), part of U.S. Route 189
- University Avenue Bridge, Philadelphia, Pennsylvania

== See also ==
- University Square (disambiguation)
- University Street (disambiguation)
- University (disambiguation)
