= University Street, Donetsk =

University street, Donetsk
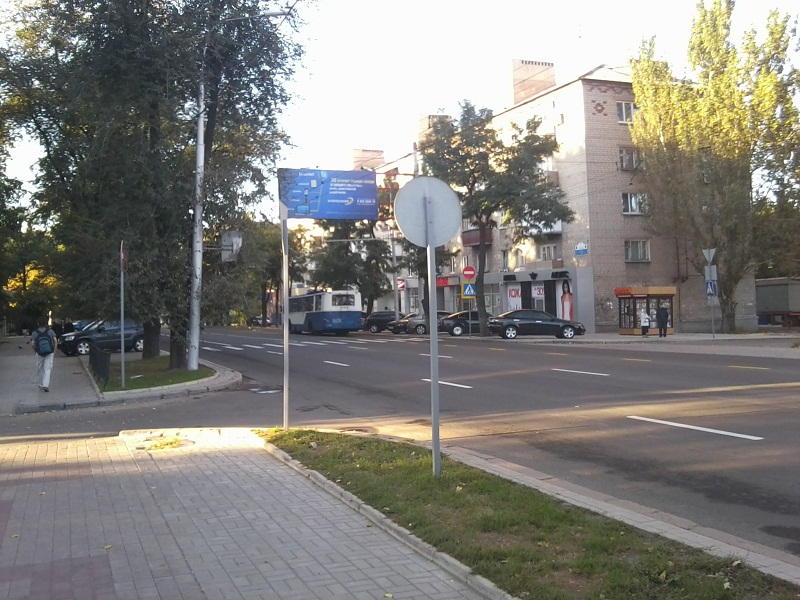
- Native name: улица Университетская (Russian)
- Former name(s): 6 liniya, Skotoprogonna
- Length: 5,500 m (18,000 ft)
- Location: Central Donetsk, Ukraine

University street (Ukrainian: Вулиця Університетська, Russian: улица Университетская) is a street in central Donetsk, Ukraine. It is located in the city's Kyivskyi Raion and Voroshylovskyi Raion.

== Gallery ==
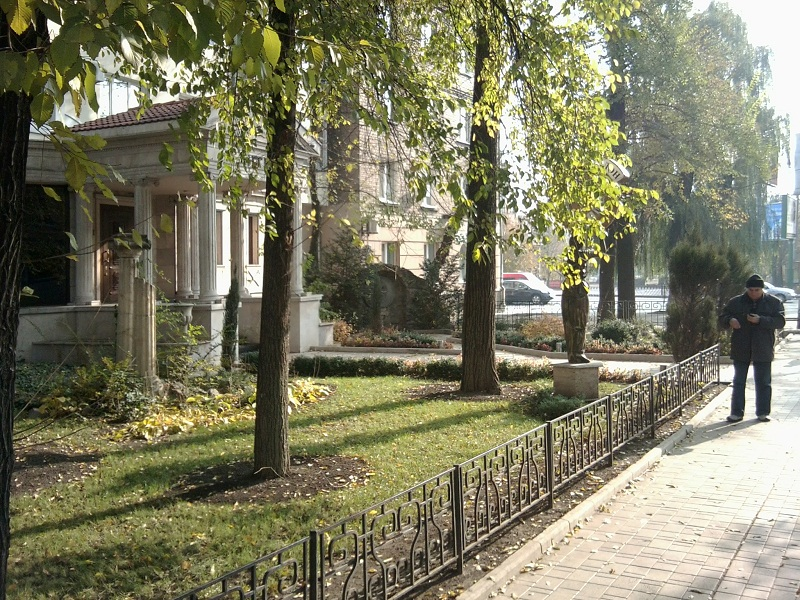
University street

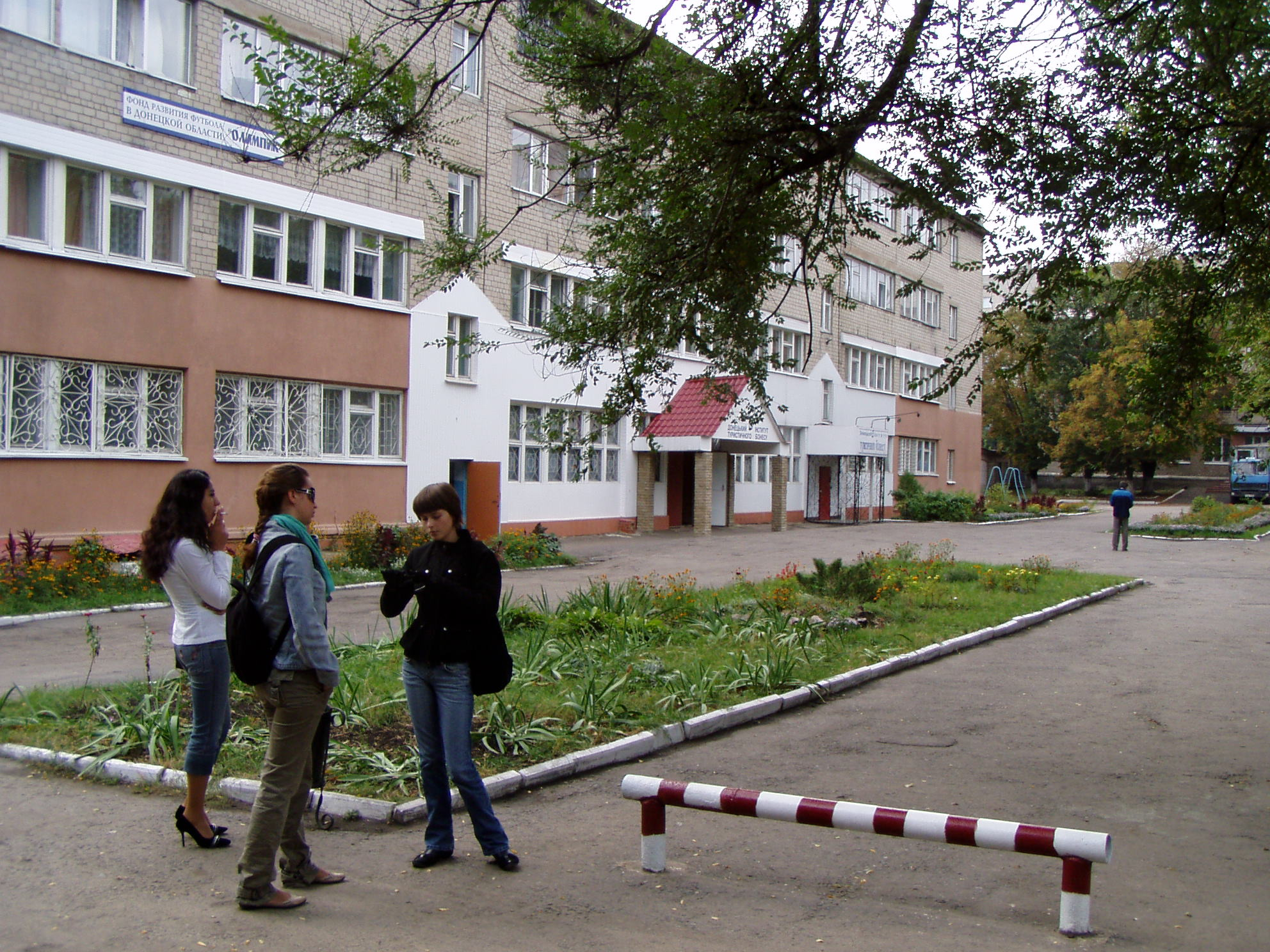
Donetsk Institute of Tourist Business (DITB)

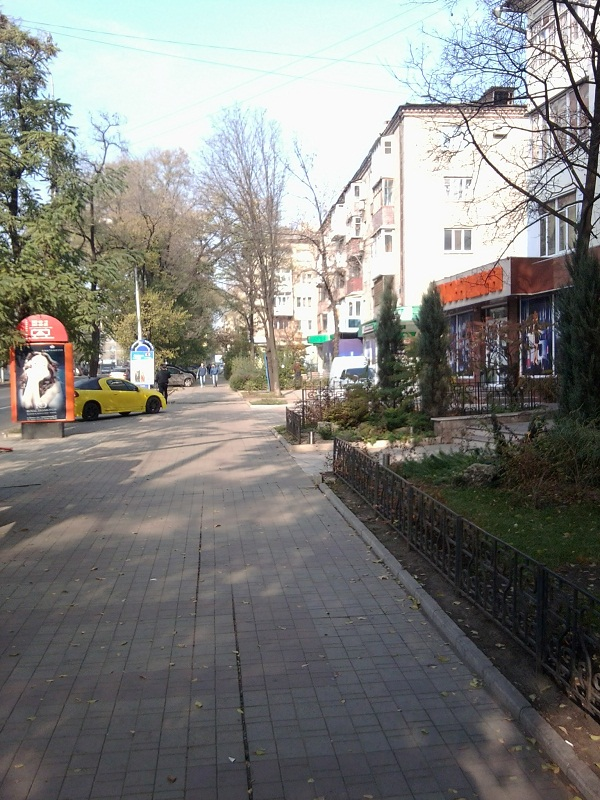
University street

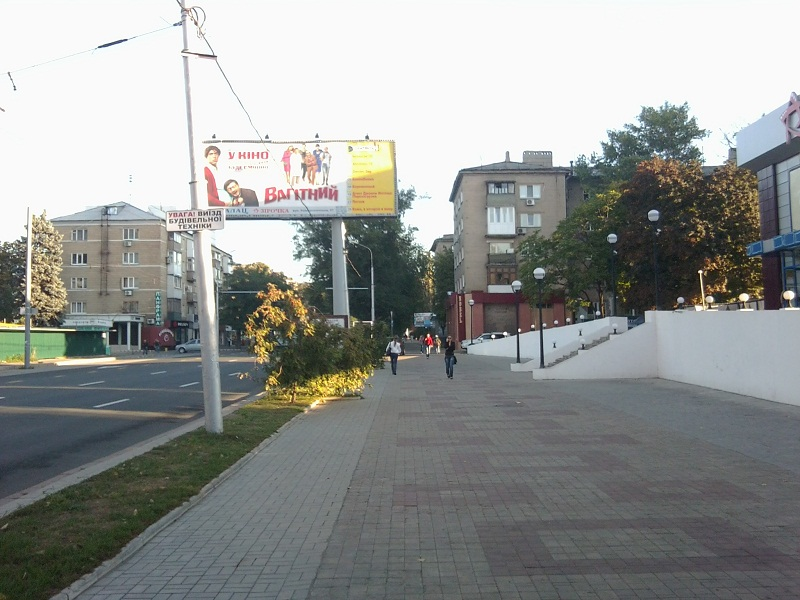
University street

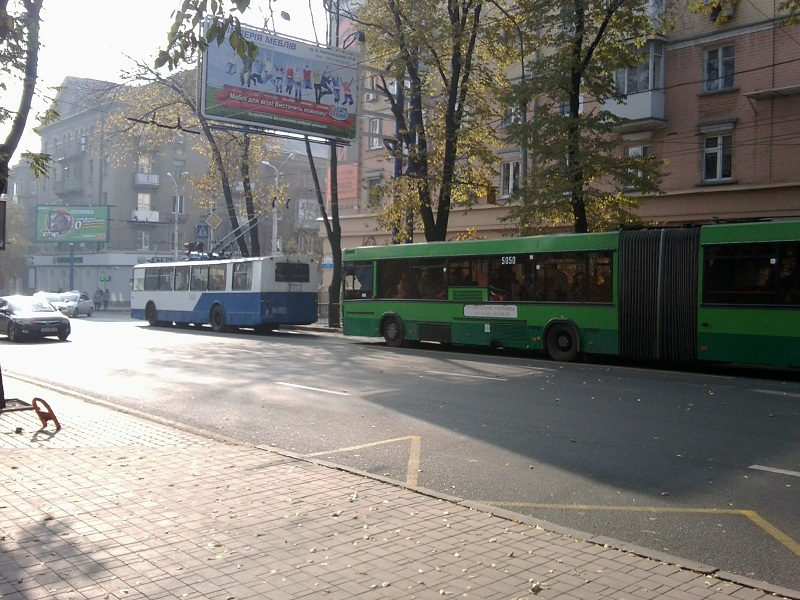
University street
