= University Square =

University Square may refer to:

- University Square, Bucharest, the site of 1990 protests demanding the exclusion of ex-Communists from Romanian politics
- University Square, in Sanaa, Yemen, more recently known as Change Square (At-Taghir), a focal point of the 2011 Yemeni protests
- University Square (Tampa), a neighborhood of Tampa, Florida
- University Square, San Diego, a neighborhood within the University City area of San Diego, California
- University Square (Madison), a development in Madison, Wisconsin
- Karabük University Square, an urban square in Karabük, Turkey.

== See also ==
- University (disambiguation)
