= McCain Mall =

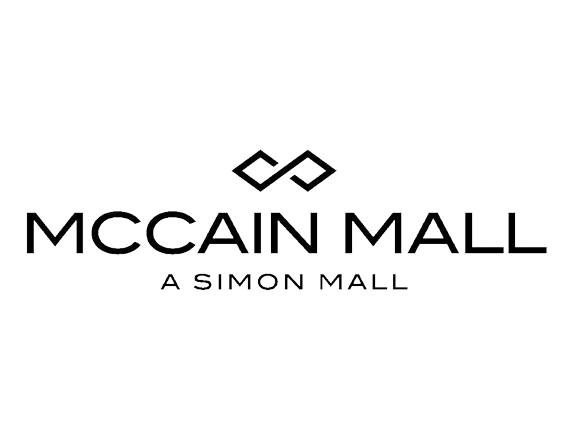

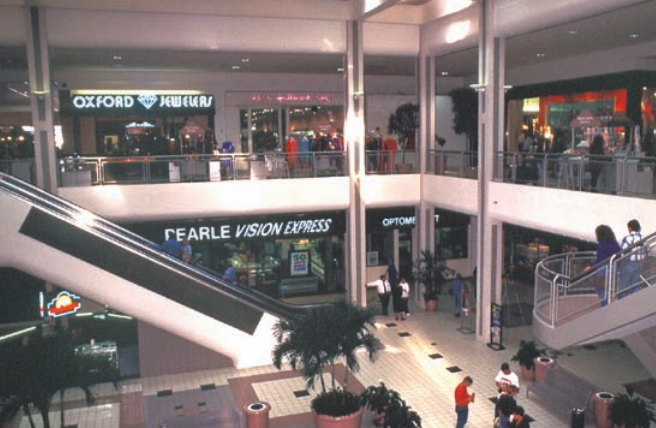
- Center Court, 1999
- Location: North Little Rock, Arkansas, United States
- Coordinates: 34°47′35″N 92°13′36″W
- Opened: April 1973
- Developer: Melvin Simon & Associates (Simon Property Group)
- Manager: Simon Property Group, Inc.
- Owner: Simon Property Group, Inc.
- Num. of stores: 96
- Num. of anchor tenants: 4
- Floor area: 793,630 square feet (73,730.6 m^{2})
- Floors: 2 (3 in Dillard's)
- Public transit: Rock Region Metro Bus Route 10
- Website: simon.com/mall/mccain-mall

McCain Mall is a shopping mall located in North Little Rock, Arkansas, and is the largest mall in the Little Rock Metro and third largest enclosed mall in Arkansas. The mall is anchored by Dillard's, JCPenney, Deep Discount Furniture & Mattress, and Regal Cinemas.

== History ==
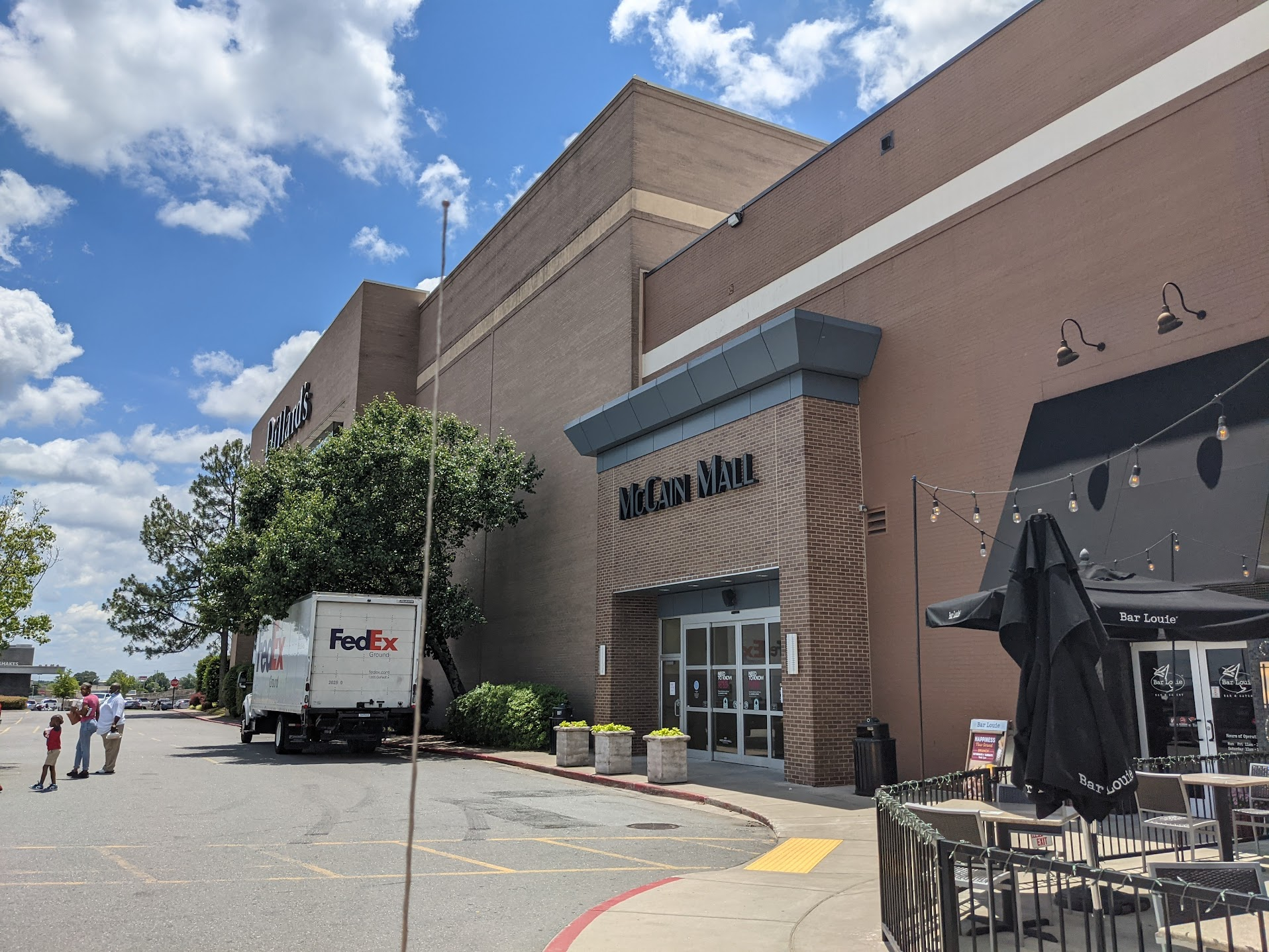
McCain Mall's North Entrance, June 2021

McCain Mall was developed as Arkansas's largest mall on a 53.3-acre site on McCain Boulevard near Interstate 40. The mall was officially dedicated in April 1973, although its primary anchor, Little Rock-based Pfeifer-Blass (now Dillard's), had opened for business in late 1972. Among its 96 stores and services were a J.G. McCrory 5 and 10 and McCain Mall Cinema I and II.

Over its 30+ year history, McCain Mall has never been expanded, although renovations were done in 1992 and again in 2011–2012. The former location of M. M. Cohn was demolished in 2012 for a Regal Entertainment Group movie theater.

In 2015, Sears Holdings spun off its 235 properties, including the Sears at McCain Mall, into Seritage Growth Properties. The auto center closed in 2017 and was demolished. A LongHorn Steakhouse opened on January 22, 2019 at the site of the auto center. On November 7, 2019, it was announced that Sears would be closing this location a part of a plan to close 96 stores nationwide. The store closed on February 2, 2020.

In the 2020s, Overstock Furniture & Mattress opened utilizing the former Sears anchor space. Overstock Furniture & Mattress was a discount furniture and mattress store. Sometime after Overstock Furniture & Mattress opened in the former Sears, the name was changed to Deep Discount Furniture & Mattress. The store continues to operate out of the former Sears anchor space.

== Gallery ==
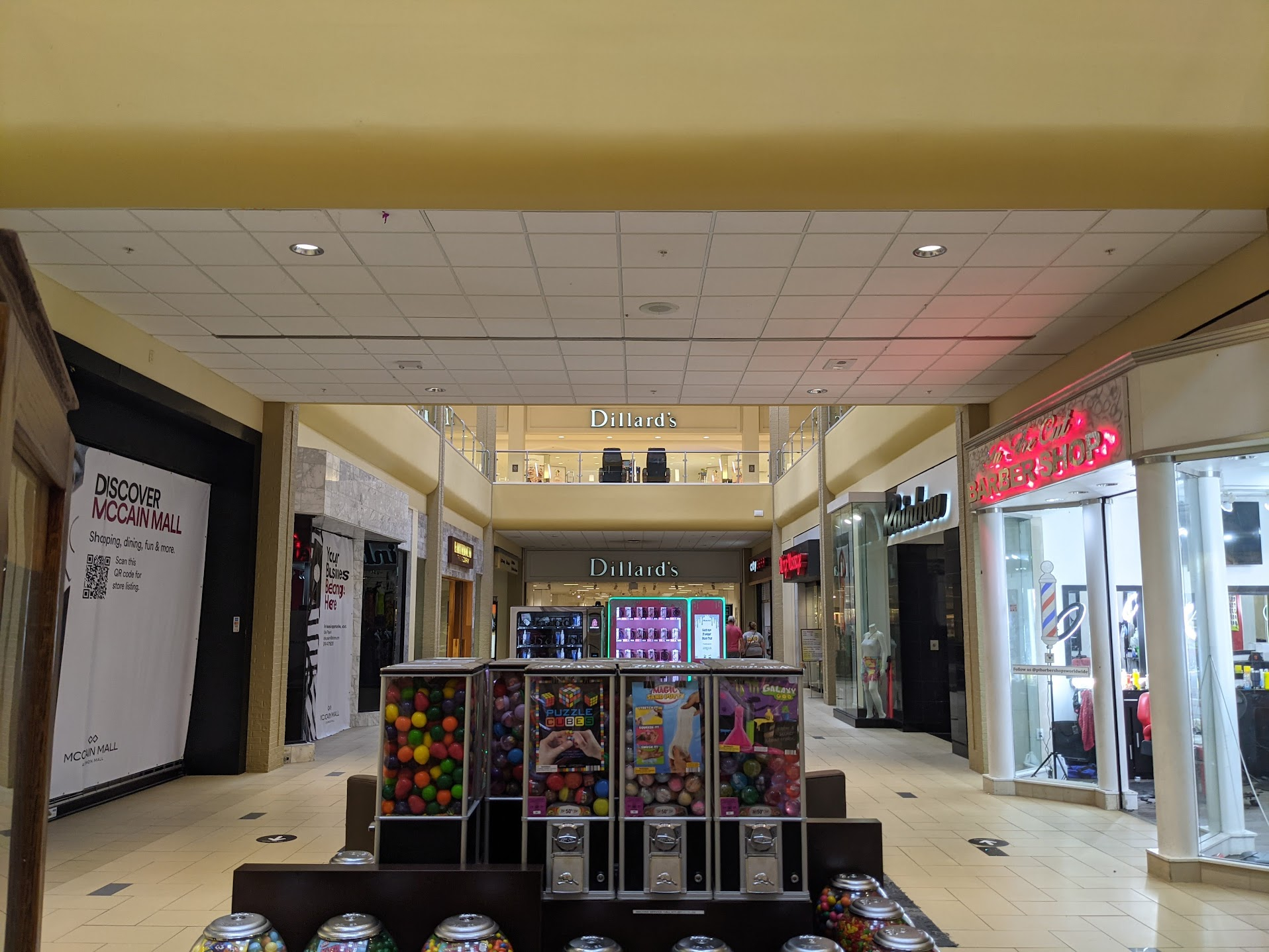
East Wing from 1st floor, June 2021

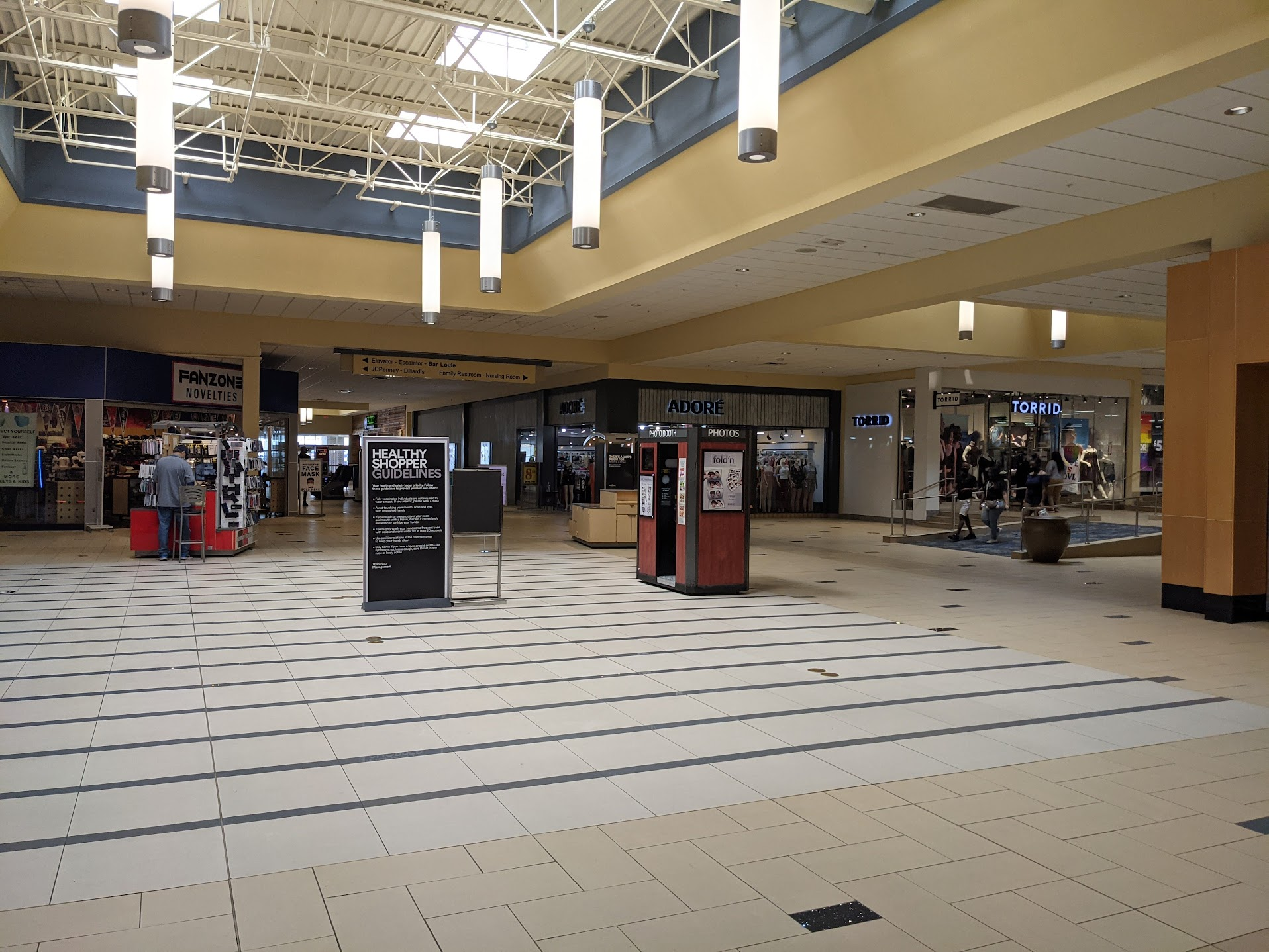
West Wing, June 2021

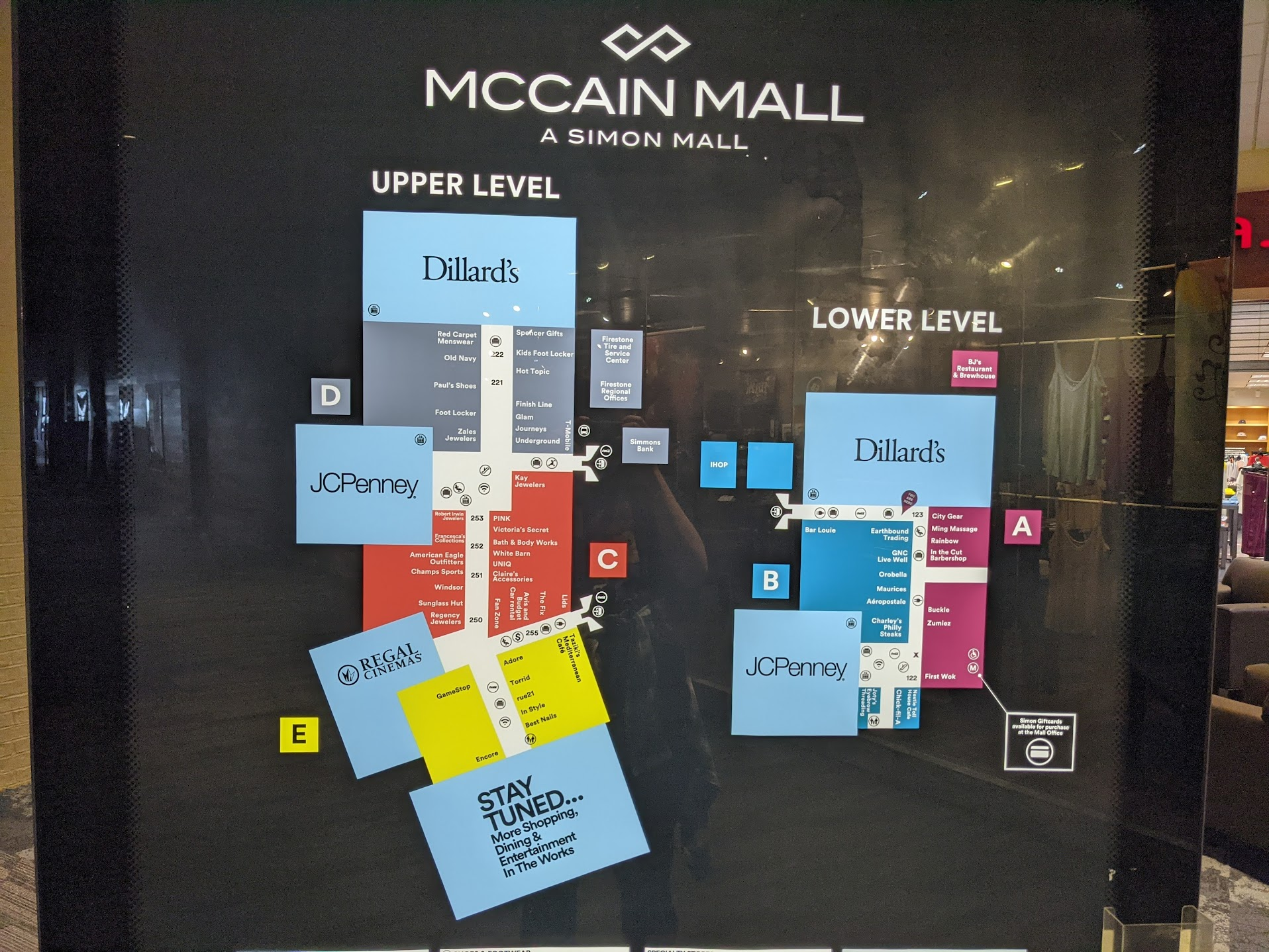
Mall Directory, June 2021

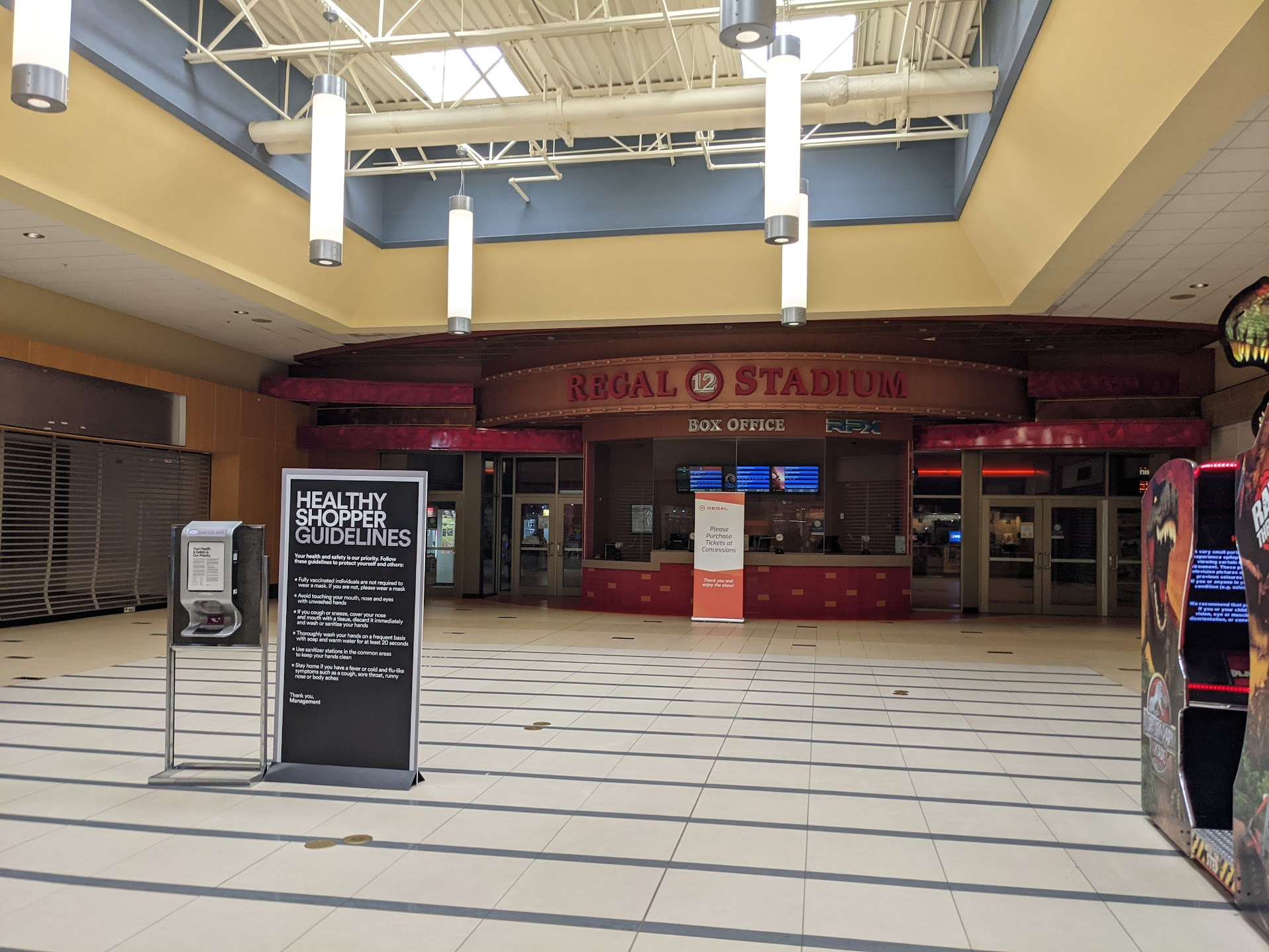
Regal Cinema, June 2021

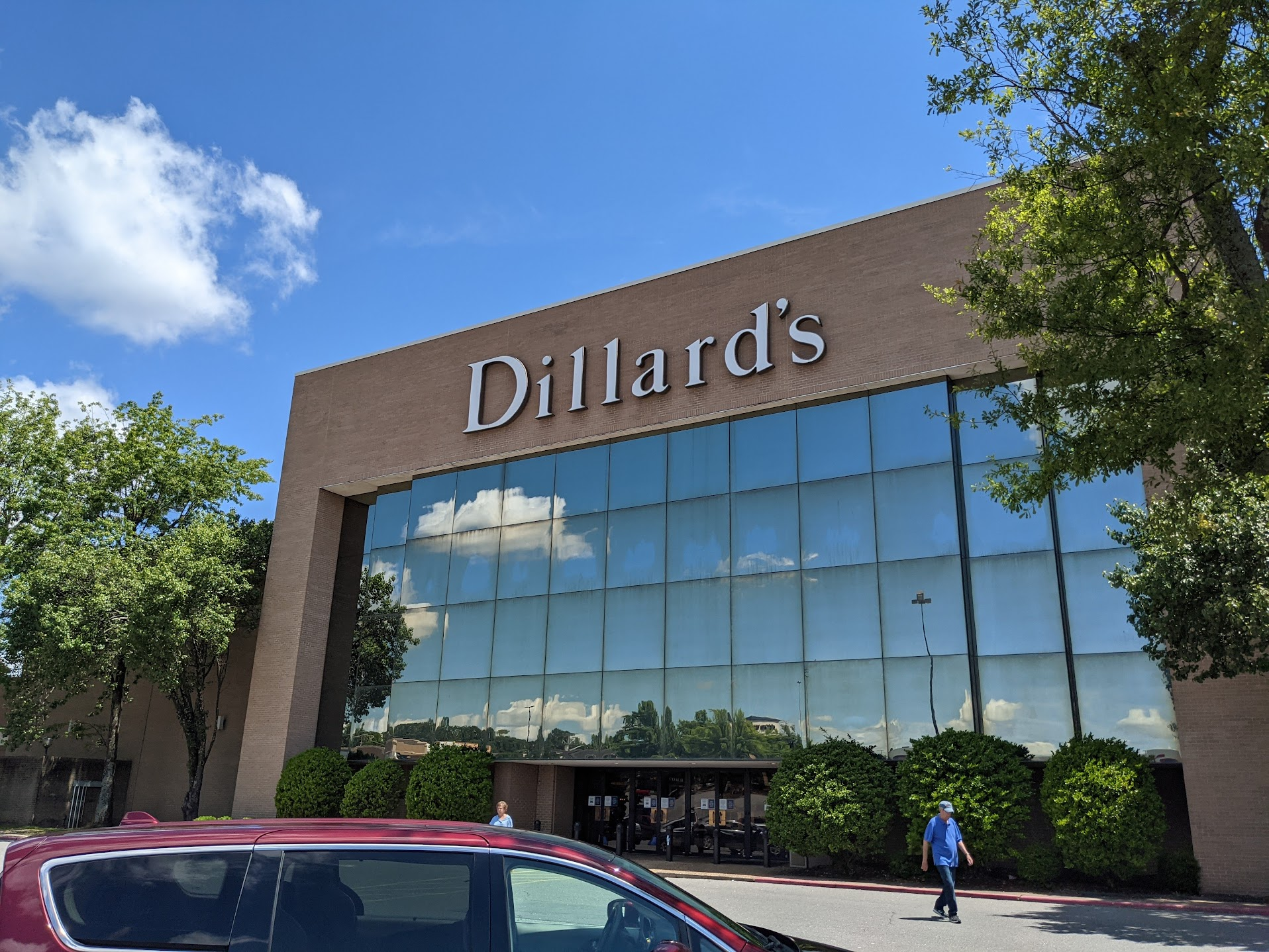
Dillard's, June 2021

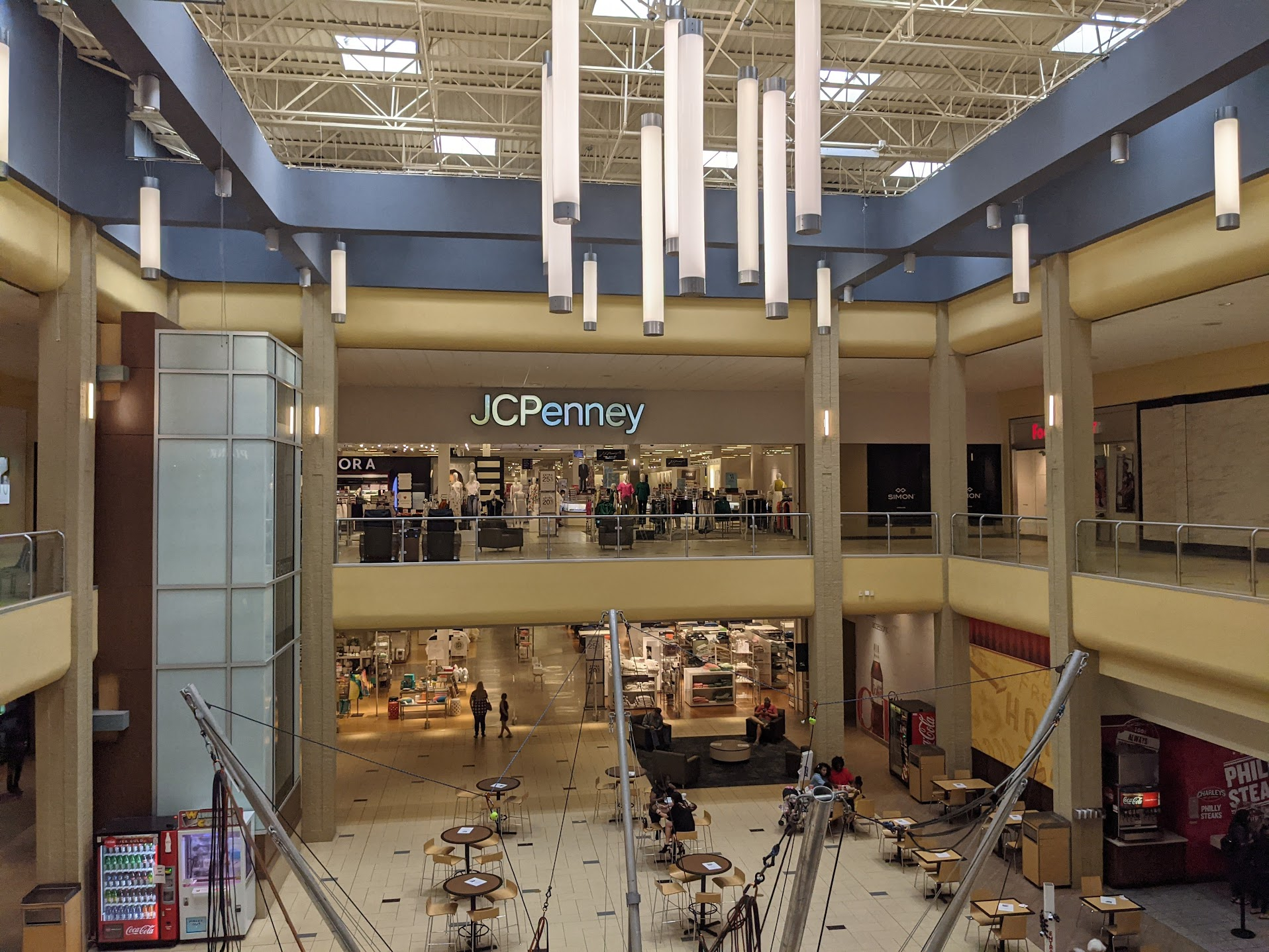
JCPenney Entrance and Court, June 2021

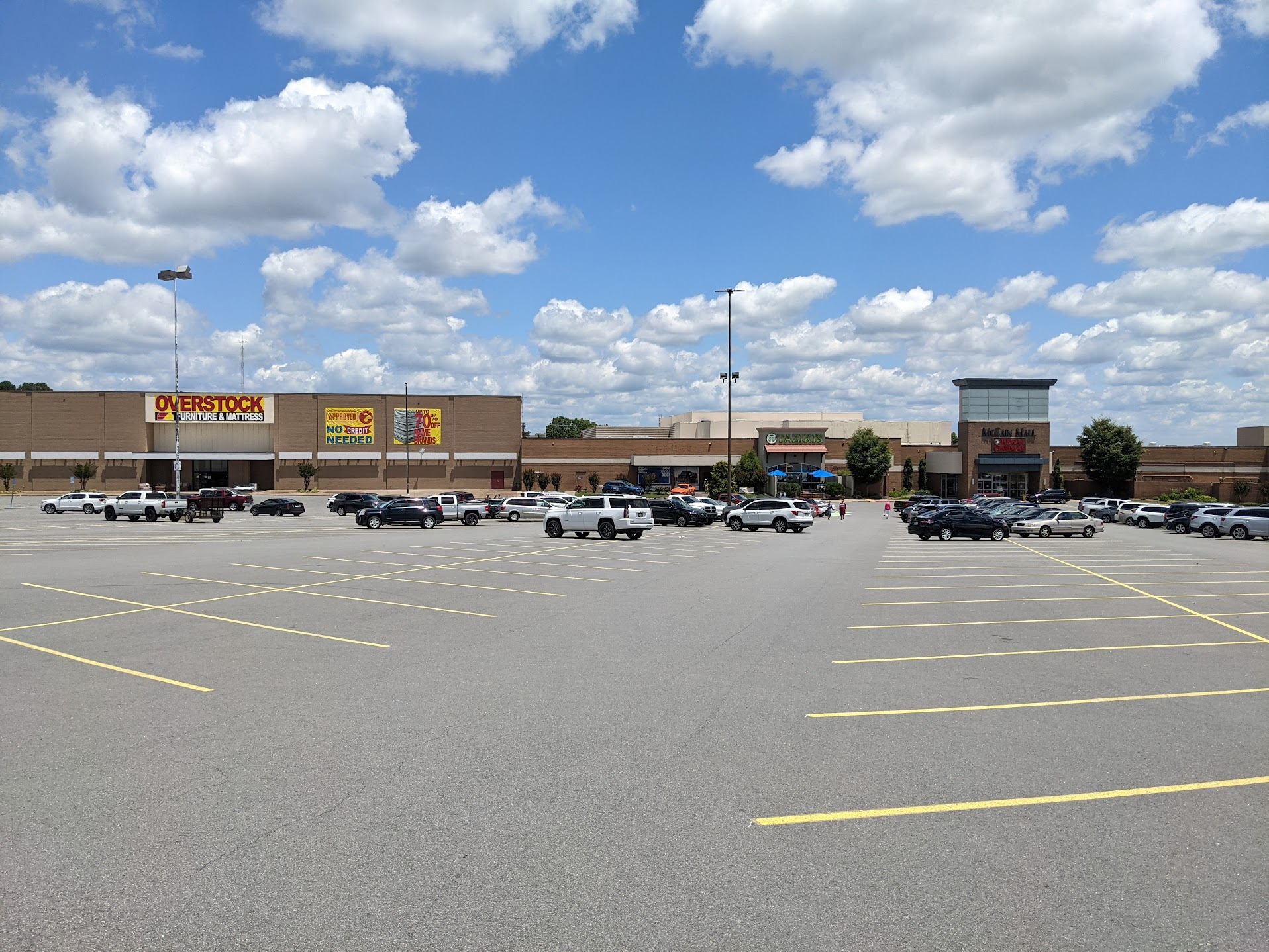
Sears and West Wing facade, June 2021

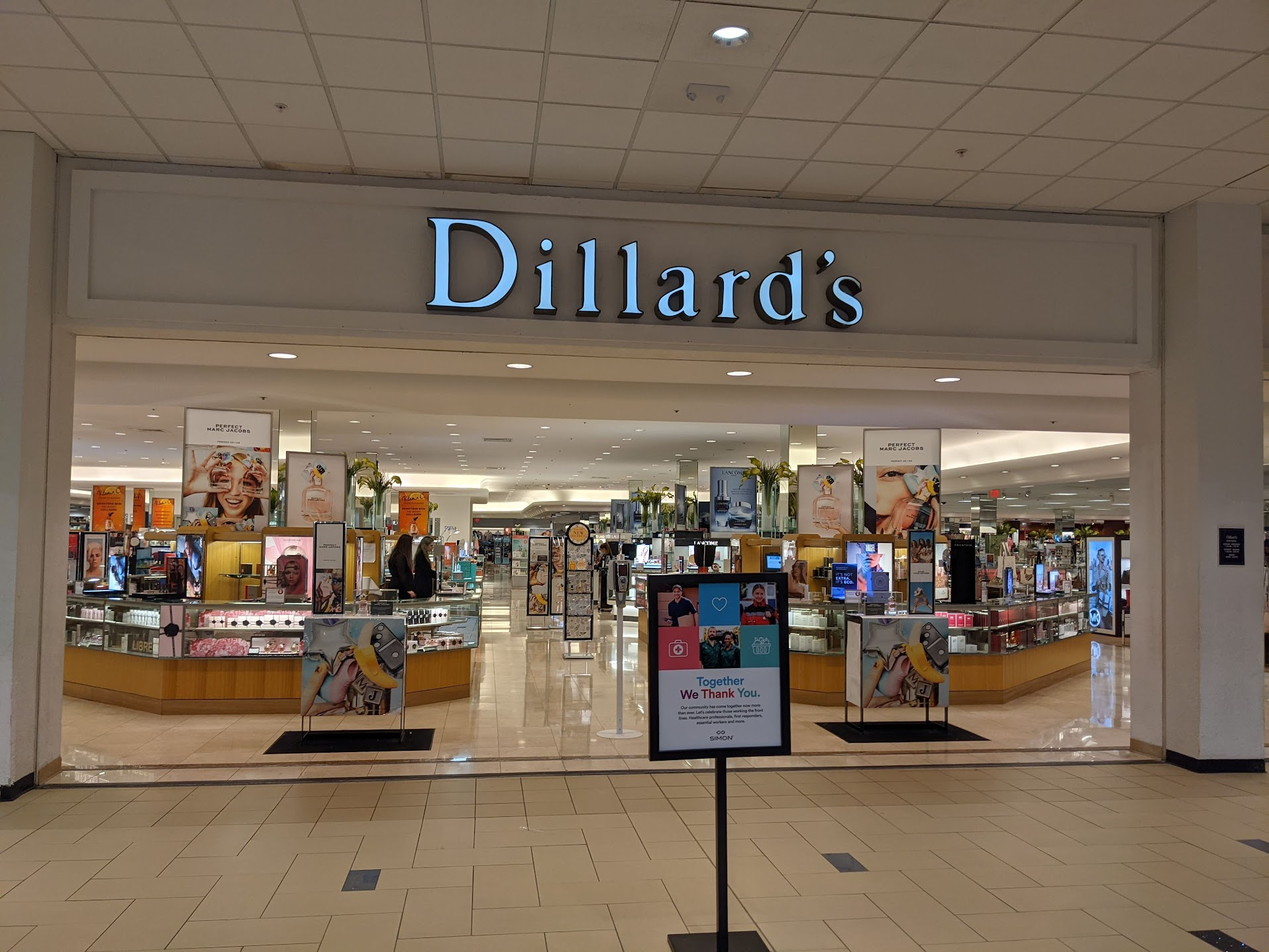
Dillard's Entrance, June 2021

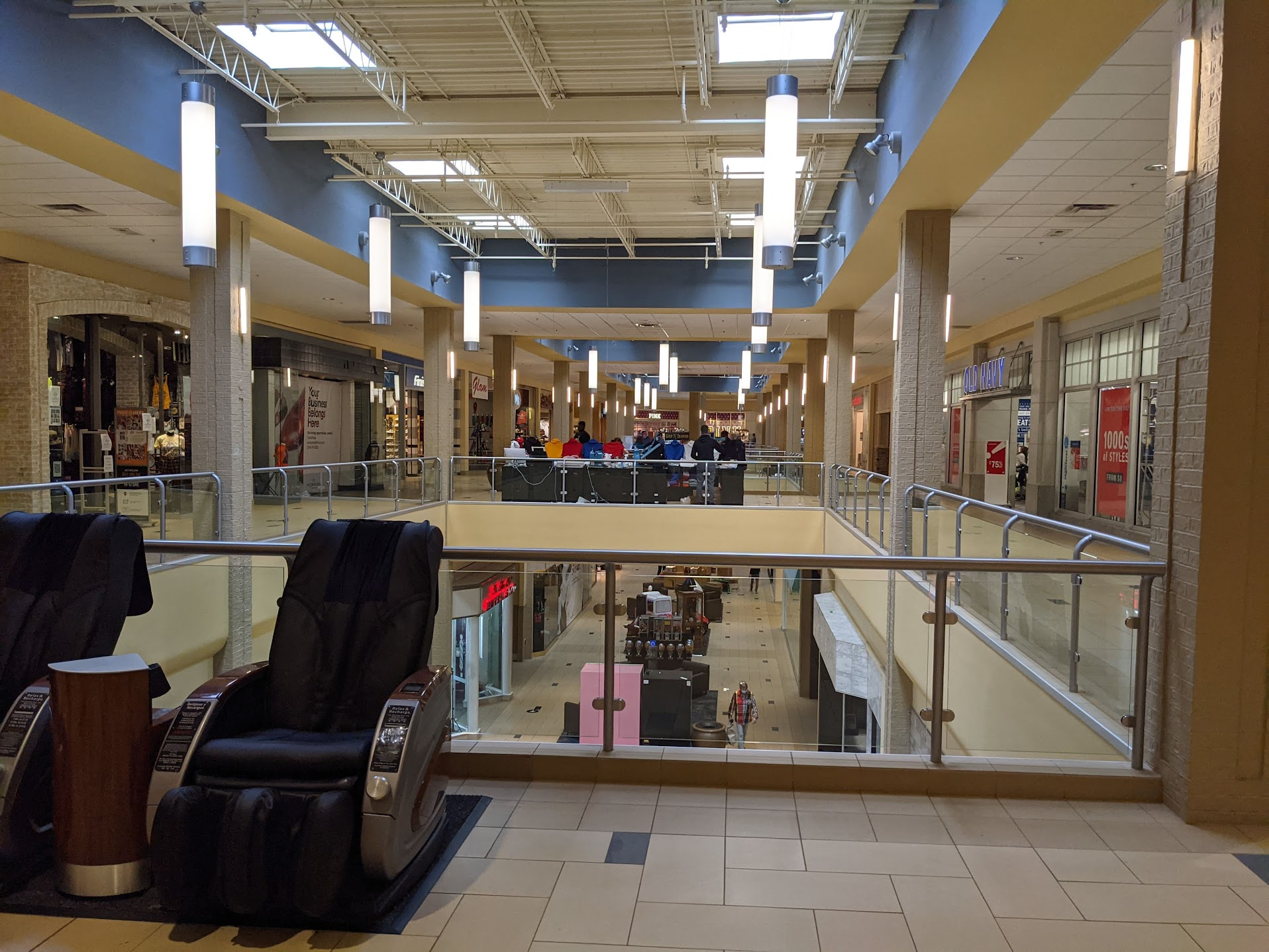
East Wing, June 2021

== Murders and Criminal Acts on the Premises ==
McCain Mall and attached parking areas have been the site of multiple crime scenes.

=== Rape and Murder of Laurie White (June 1997) ===
In June 1997, Laura "Laurie" White, a 26-year-old overnight guard, was murdered by Andrew Engram. After strangling Ms. White and inflicting blunt neck trauma, Engram left her body to be discovered hanging inside the outdoor Sears landscape merchandise tent she had been guarding. During the course of the murder, Engram also raped Ms. White. At the time of the attack, Laurie White was alone and did not have access to a telephone, a radio, or the nearby building.

White's parents filed a federal lawsuit against Simon Property Group, Inc. and Sears which was settled out of court in 2000 with details undisclosed.

Engram, who had been on parole for only 6 months at the time of White's rape and murder (after having been sentenced to 30 years of prison in 1983 for violent crimes), was convicted in 1999 and sentenced to death. The prosecution relied on overwhelming evidence including DNA profiling in securing the jury conviction. In 2013, Engram's lawyers successfully petitioned the Arkansas Supreme Court for a new hearing after an appeal in which they argued he received ineffective assistance of counsel from the court-appointed lawyers during his original trial. As evidence, they referred to the failure to meet deadlines for filing petitions, including those questioning whether Engram had an intellectual disability (or otherwise diminished responsibility).

In 2014, Engram was re-sentenced to life in prison without parole. As of October 2025, he is an inmate at the high-security Varner Unit of the Arkansas Department of Corrections.

=== Concourse Gunshot (August 2020) ===
In August of 2020, a man entered the mall and it is confirmed that he fired one shot within the concourse.

=== Christmas Eve Shooting near McCain Mall (December 2020) ===
One person was killed, and two juveniles were injured in a shooting near the mall.

=== Double Homicide near McCain Mall (November 2022) ===
Police investigated a shooting on McCain Boulevard, finding two victims inside a vehicle in the parking lot of the mall, who had been shot. Both victims were 17 years old, and one died at the scene.

=== American Eagle Gunshot (January 2023) ===
North Little Rock police responded to a report of a gunshot fired inside the mall, specifically at American Eagle. A woman shopping at Victoria's Secret reported feeling terrified and crawling on the floor for safety.
