= Lasalle & Koch =

Defunct department store in Ohio, United States

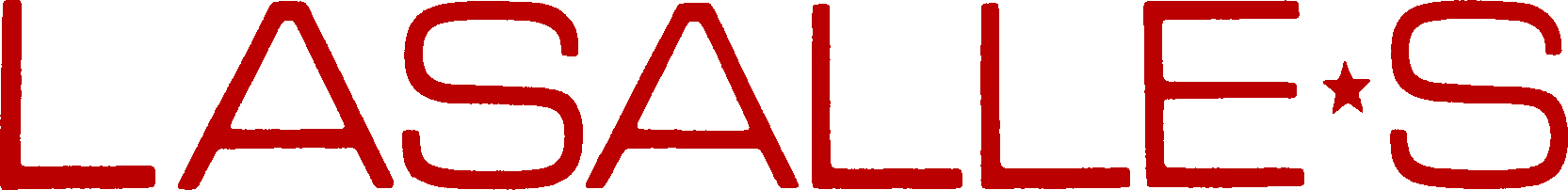
Lasalle's final logo

Lasalle & Koch Co. or Lasalle's was a department store in Toledo, Ohio, with branches in some nearby communities.

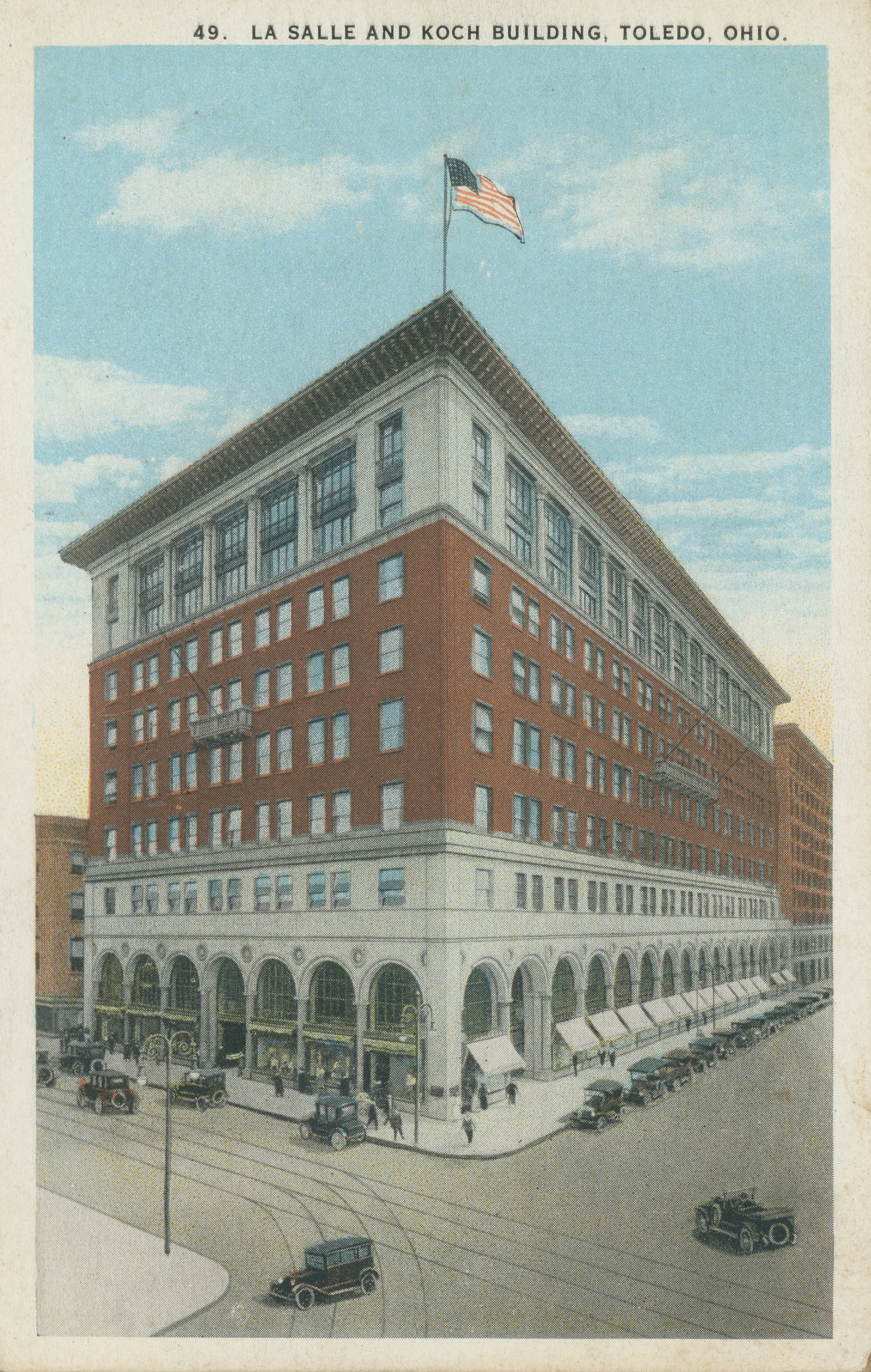
LaSalle and Koch Building, Toledo, Ohio

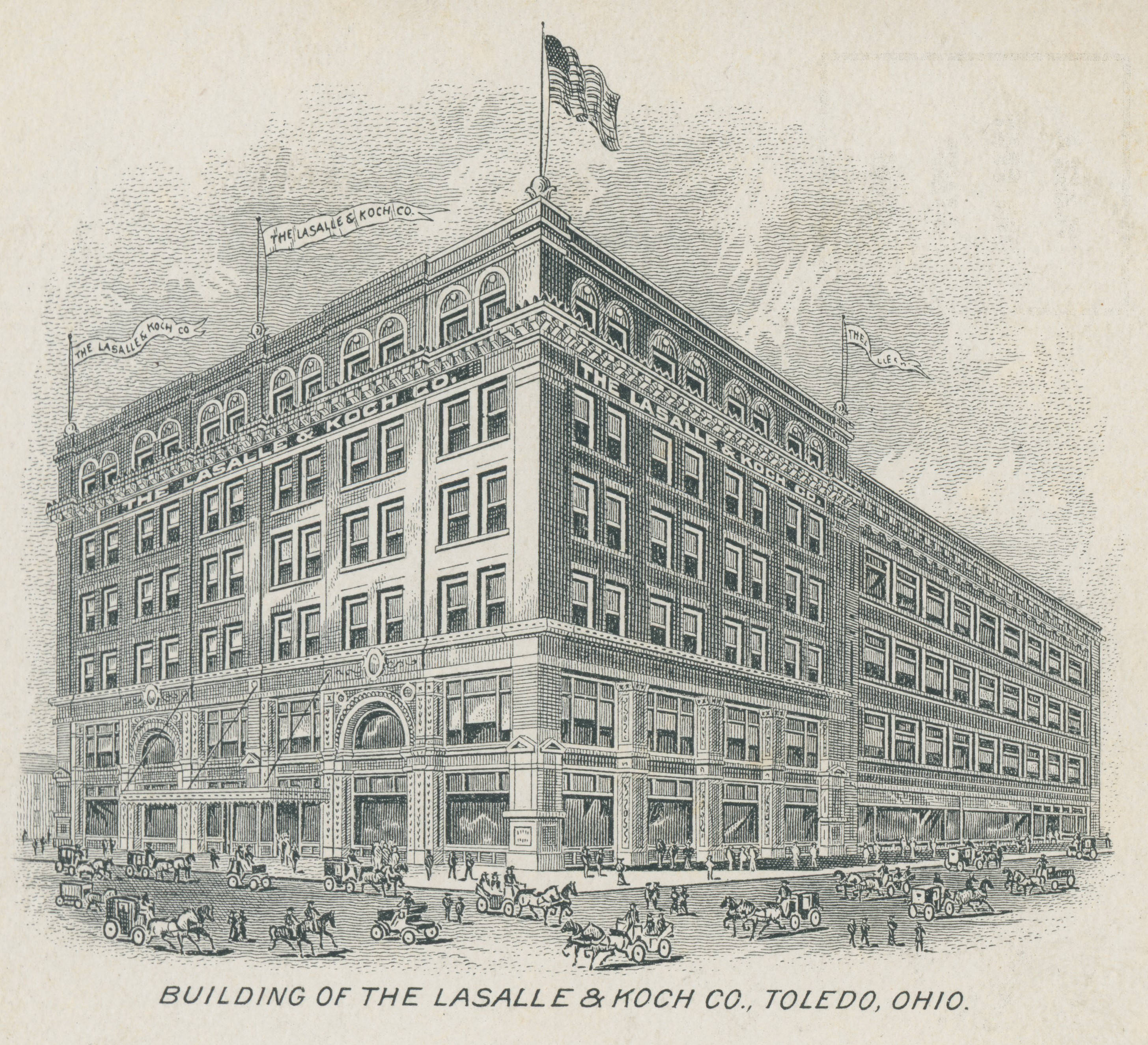
LaSalle and Koch Building, Toledo, Ohio

Lasalle & Koch Department Store Logo

== History ==
Lasalle's traces its beginnings to a store opened in 1865 by Jacob Lasalle and Joseph Epstein, at 51 Summit Street. In 1883, Joseph Koch joined the business, which relocated to a new store at the corner of Summit and Adams Streets. In 1900, the Lasalle & Koch Co. opened a new store at the corner of Jefferson Avenue and Superior Street. This store was enlarged several times, and in 1916, ground was broken for a new store at Adams and Huron Streets.

The Lasalle & Koch Co. opened its flagship downtown Toledo store at 513 Adams Street in 1917. R.H. Macy Co. purchased the company in 1923.

In November 1927, Lasalle & Koch Co. completed the addition of three upper floors, and to celebrate, commissioned mural artist Arthur Covey to create a series of paintings about Toledo-area industries which were exhibited in the store's display windows.

Lasalle and Koch retained a great deal of autonomy, with Alfred B. Koch, son of Joseph Koch, serving as president until his untimely death in 1937. He was succeeded by another Lasalle and Koch veteran, Louis Epstein.

During the postwar era, Lasalle's expanded by opening branches in the downtown shopping districts of smaller Northwest Ohio cities: Bowling Green (1945), Tiffin (1947), Sandusky (1949), and Findlay (1955).

In late 1957 and most of 1958, there was a 13-month-long strike against Lasalle's and two other Toledo department stores, Lamson's and The Lion Store, by the Retail Clerks International Association, which later became the United Food and Commercial Workers. The strike was settled by a "Statement of Understanding" under which the striking workers were reinstated to their jobs but the union was not recognized.

In 1962, Lasalle's opened its first suburban Toledo location, a free-standing store at Toledo's Westgate Center. Lasalle's third Toledo store, in the Woodville Mall, east of Toledo in suburban Northwood, opened in 1969. It was the first Lasalle's store in an enclosed shopping mall. Their fourth Toledo location, the 162,000 square feet (15,100 m^{2}). North Towne Square store, opened in 1980.

== Consolidation and sale ==
All Lasalle's stores were converted to the Macy's name in 1981. At the time of the name change, Lasalle's operated the flagship downtown Toledo store, and suburban branches at Westgate, North Towne Square, and Woodville Mall. Lasalle's also had stores in the downtown shopping districts of Bowling Green, Sandusky, Findlay, and Tiffin.

In 1981, Lasalle's and Macy's Missouri-Kansas were consolidated into a new division known as Macy's Midwest. Following the name change in 1981, Macy's Midwest closed Lasalle's executive offices, credit department, and buying department, and moved their functions to Kansas City. (This earlier incarnation of Macy's Midwest should not be confused with the one headquartered in St. Louis, which followed the Federated acquisition of Macy's.) After two years of gradually reducing the floor space of the downtown store by closing floors, Macy's Midwest closed the downtown flagship store. The stores in Bowling Green, Sandusky, and Tiffin closed between 1982 and 1985.

Macy's sold the remaining Toledo area and Findlay stores and their Toledo warehouse to Dayton retailer Elder-Beerman in 1985. Elder-Beerman operated a store at the Westgate Village Shopping Center at 3301 Secor Road in Toledo as well as in communities near Toledo including Woodland Mall in Bowling Green; Northtowne Mall in Defiance; Findlay Village Mall; Sandusky Mall; The Mall of Monroe and Adrian Mall. The Toledo North Towne Square and Woodville Mall stores have since closed, and Findlay store was relocated to the Findlay Village Mall by Elder-Beerman in the late 1980s. The only remaining former Lasalle's store was the Elder-Beerman at Westgate Village, which closed in 2018 when the chain ceased operations. The building was demolished in 2023.

The downtown Toledo building stood neglected and vacant for thirteen years. In 1996, developers converted the store to apartments and retail space. The building is part of the Madison Avenue Historic District. The downtown Sandusky store operated from October 1949 until June 1982. It was vacant until 1993 when Erie County purchased the structure and converted it to government offices which opened in 1996.

The Macy's store that operated in Toledo's Franklin Park Mall had no connection with the Lasalle's stores. It opened in 1971 as a branch of the J.L. Hudson Company of Detroit. Hudson's and Dayton's had merged in 1969, but each division kept its respective identity and divisional management. After Dayton-Hudson purchased Marshall Field's, all department stores adopted that nameplate in 2001, during which time corporate parent Dayton-Hudson had adopted the name of its former subsidiary, Target. The May Co. purchased Marshall Field's from Target Corp. in 2004, after some speculation that the department store business was dragging down Target's corporate profits. In 2005, The May Co. itself was bought by Federated. On September 9, 2006, the Franklin Park store became a Macy's, as did the rest of the Marshall Field stores. The Franklin Park store ceased operations in April 2025 as one of 66 stores stores nationwide the chain closed.

== Notable employees ==
- Betty Ford, former saleswoman

== Gallery of Historical Images of LaSalle and Koch Company and Store ==
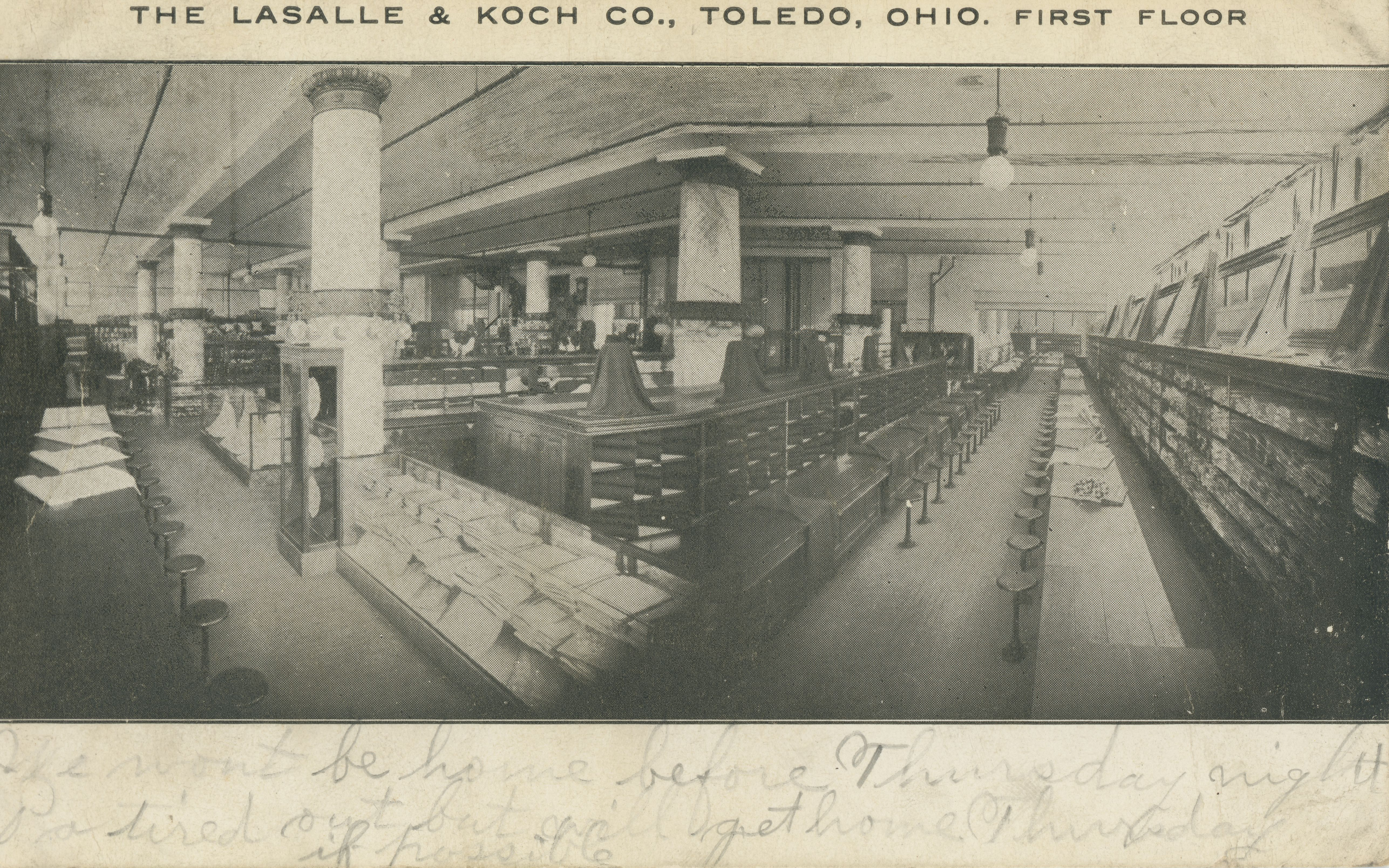
The Lasalle and Koch Company, First Floor, Toledo, Ohio

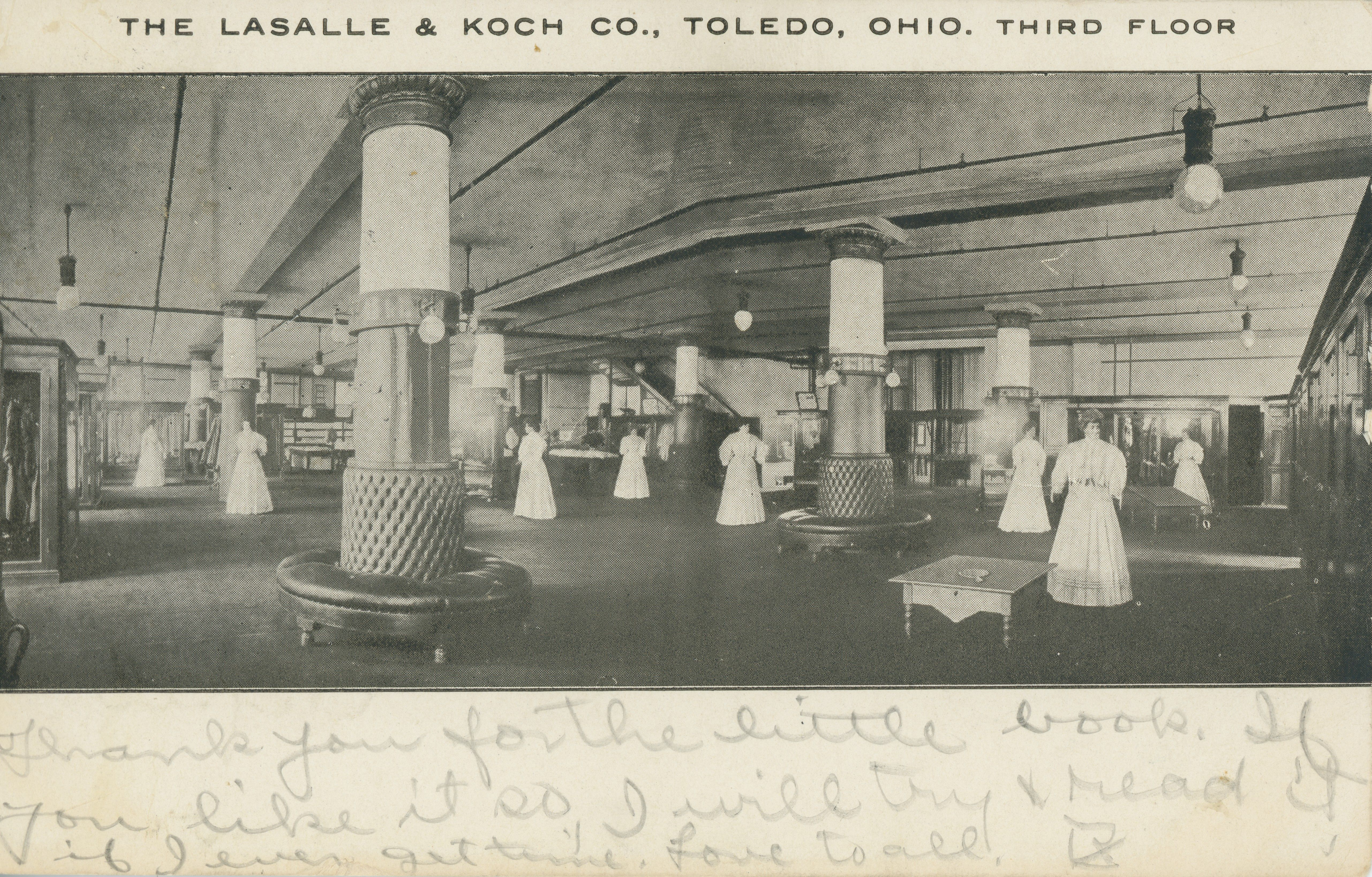
The Lasalle and Koch Company, Third Floor, Toledo, Ohio

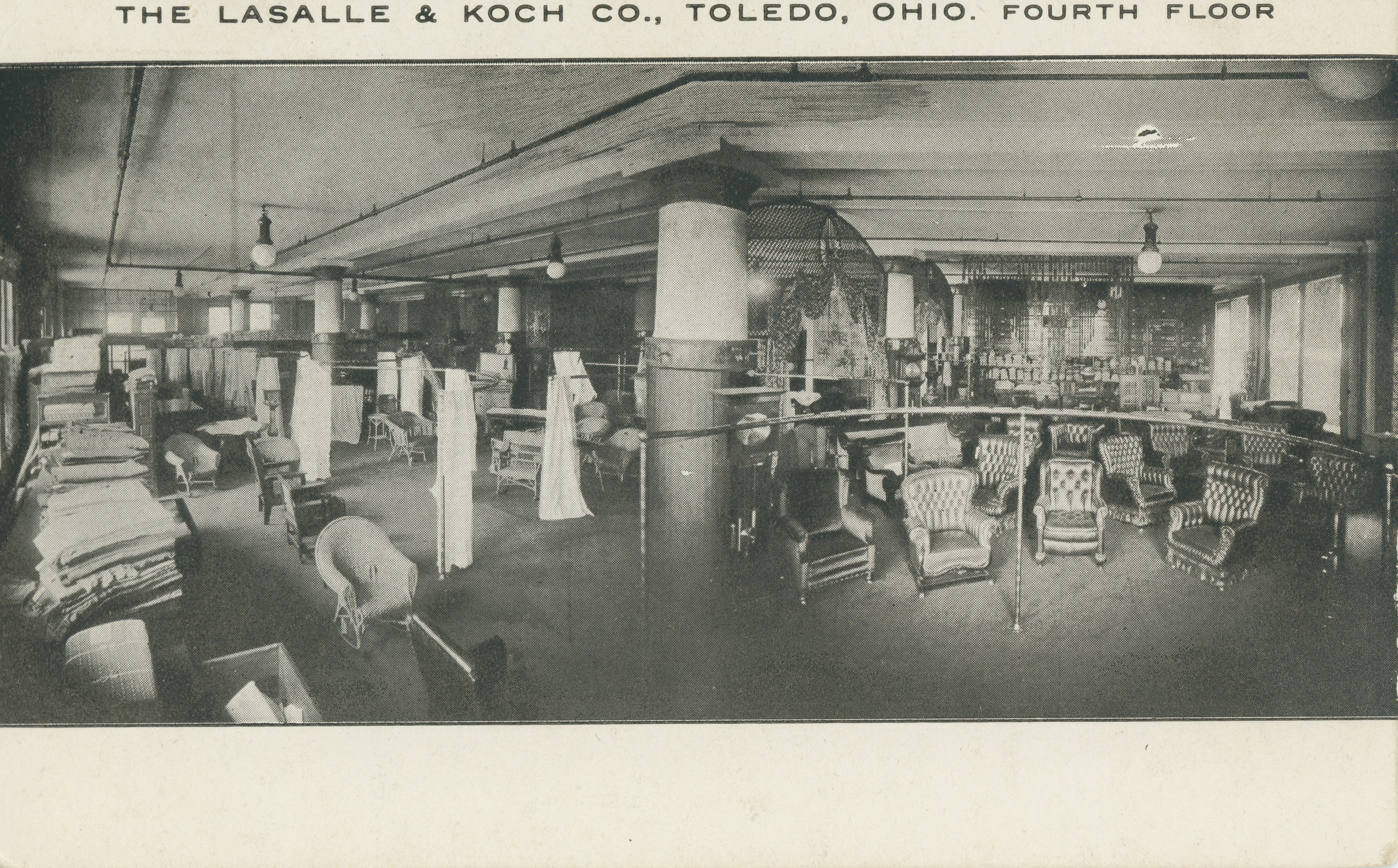
The Lasalle and Koch Company, Fourth Floor, Toledo, Ohio

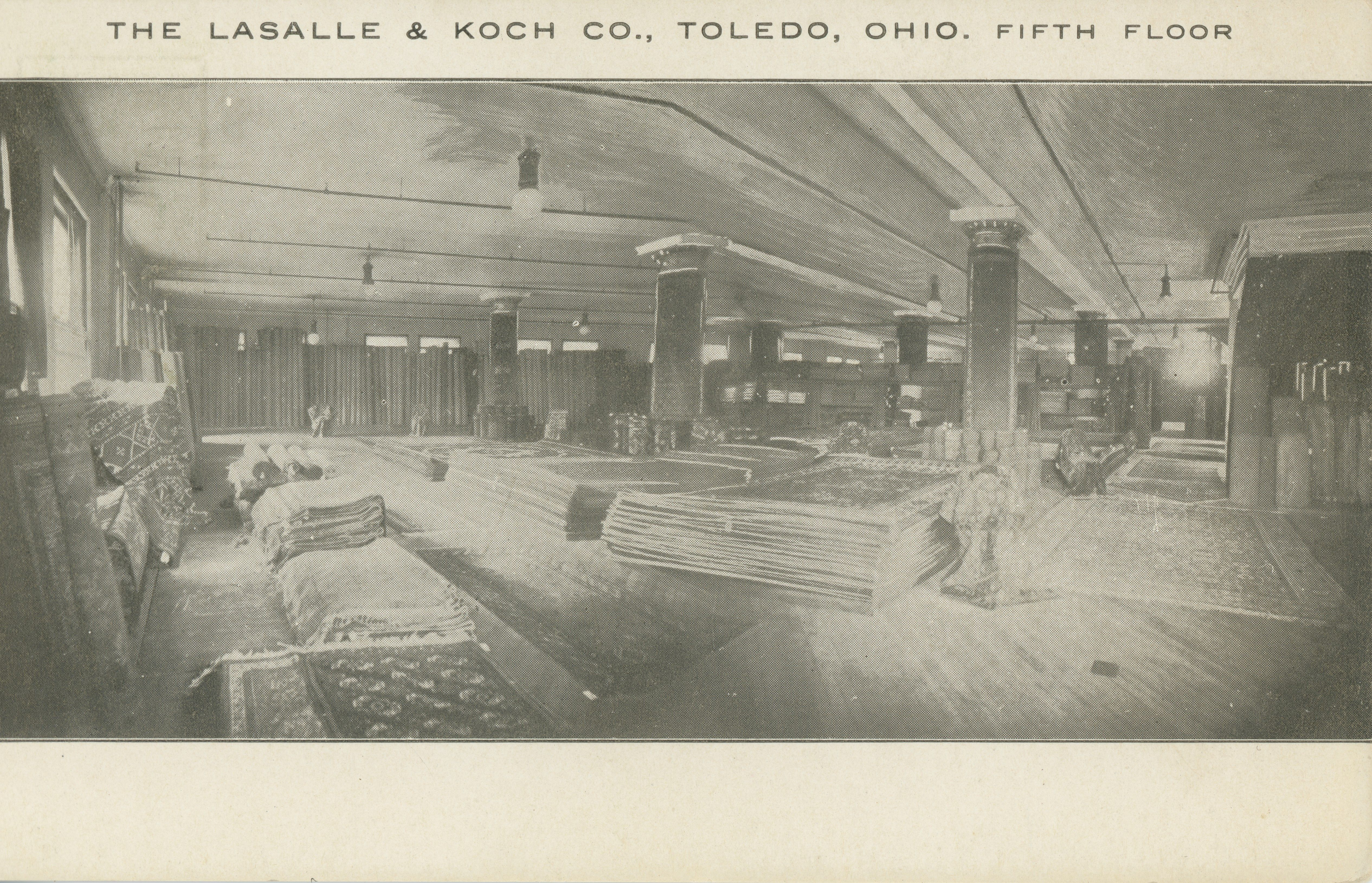
The Lasalle and Koch Company, Fifth Floor, Toledo, Ohio

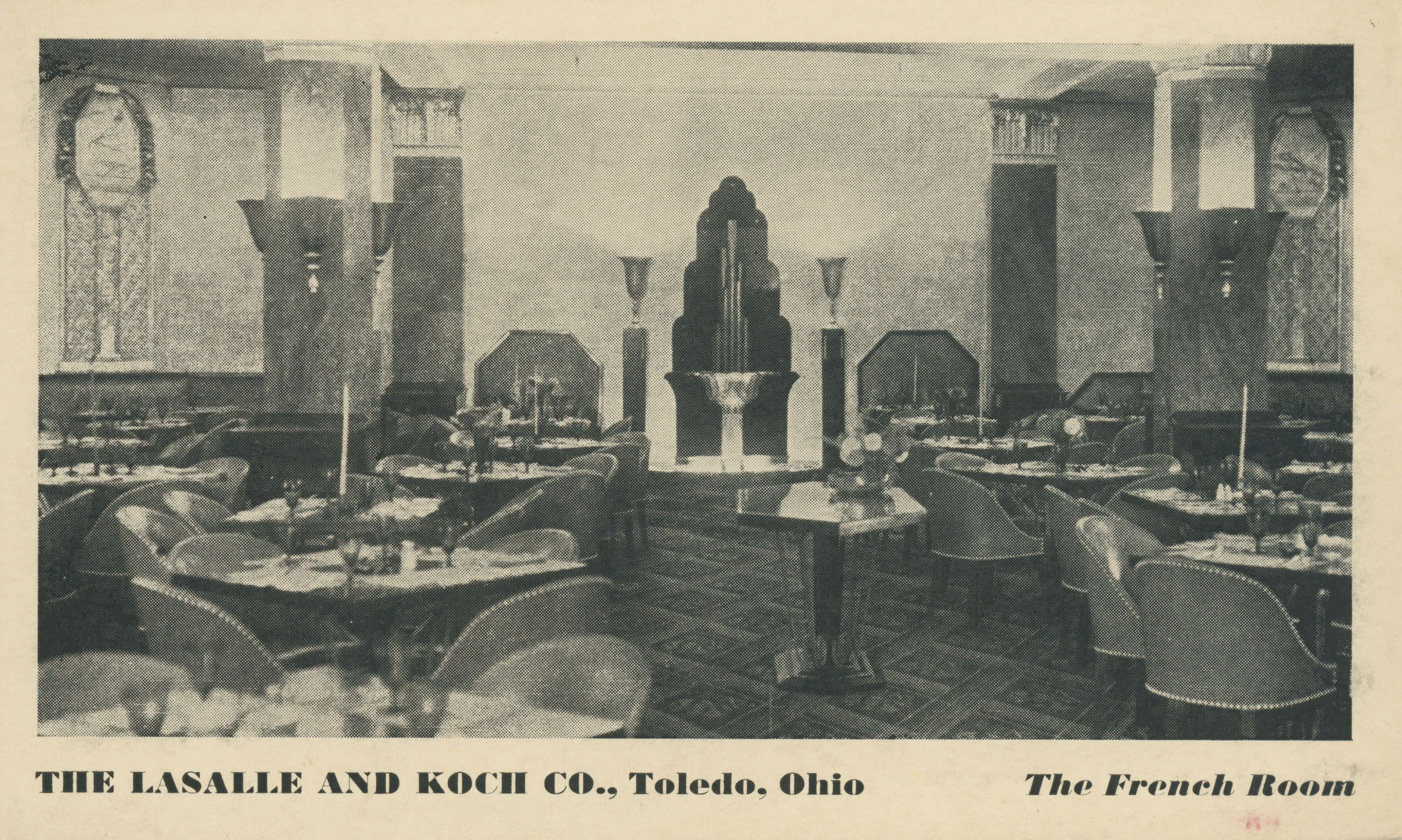
The French Room, Lasalle and Koch Company, Toledo, Ohio

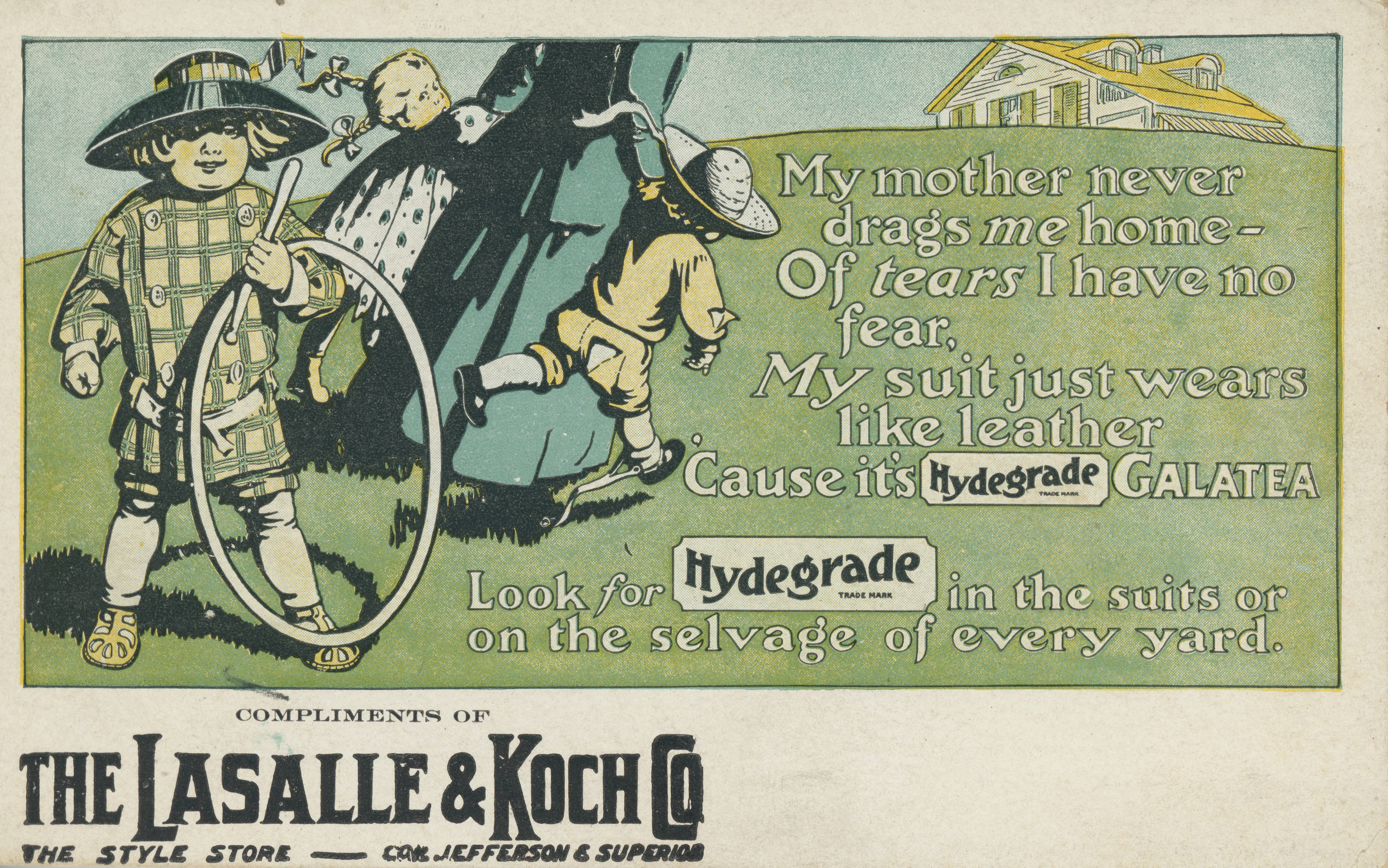
The Lasalle and Koch Company, advertisement, Toledo, Ohio

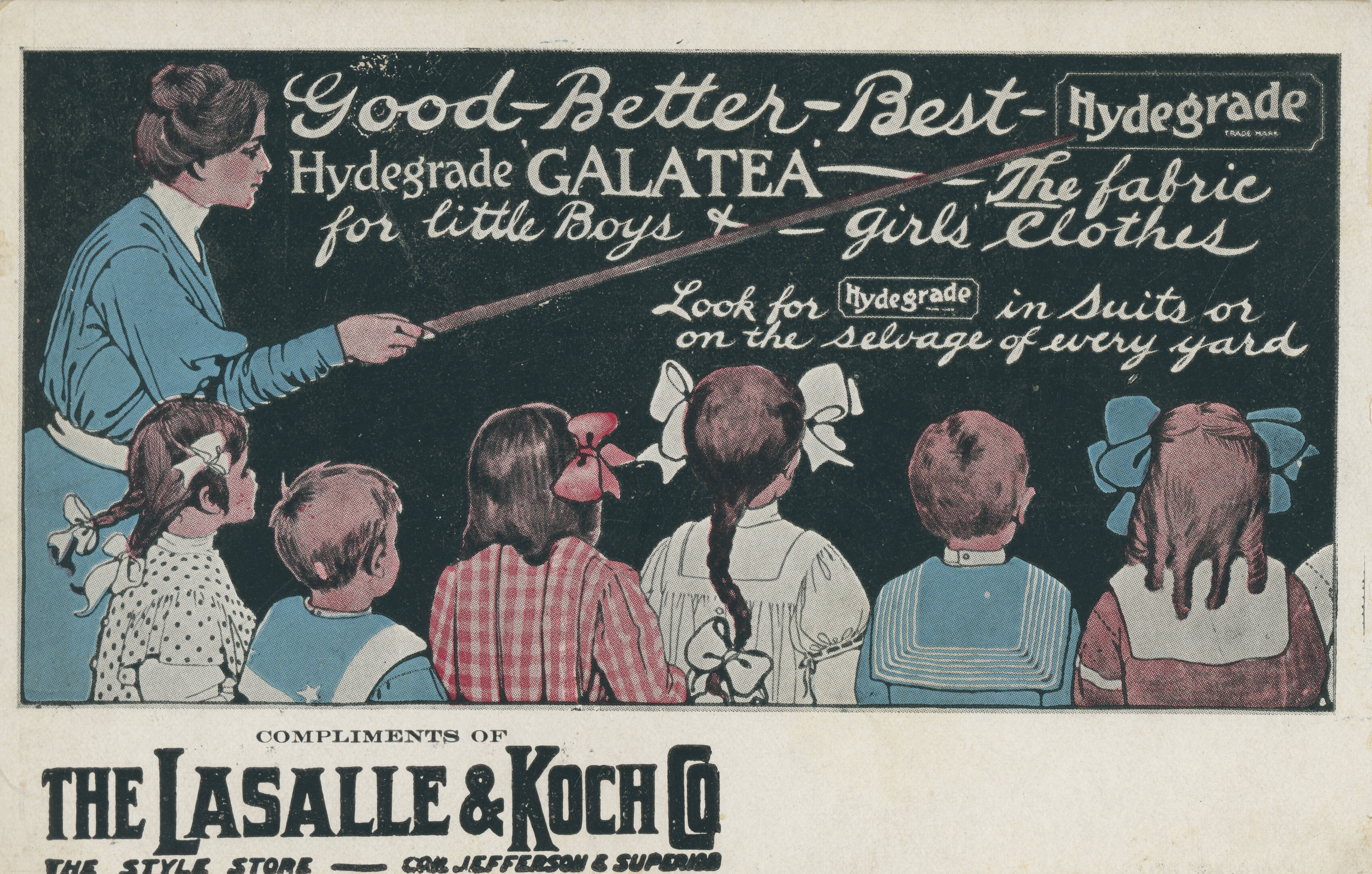
The Lasalle and Koch Company, advertisement, Toledo, Ohio

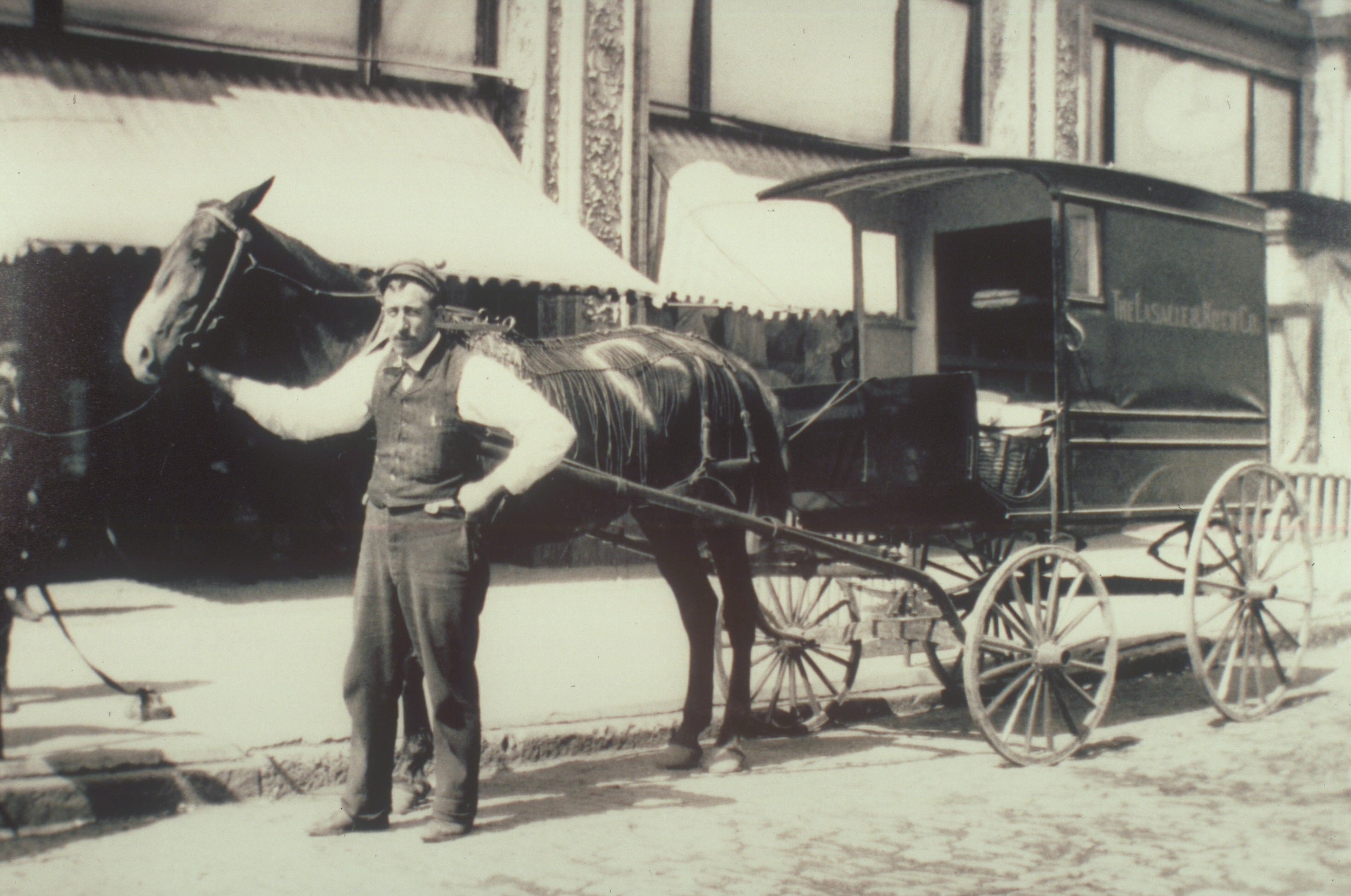
Horse drawn delivery wagon for LaSalle and Koch
