= Woodville Mall =

Former shopping center in Northwood, Ohio

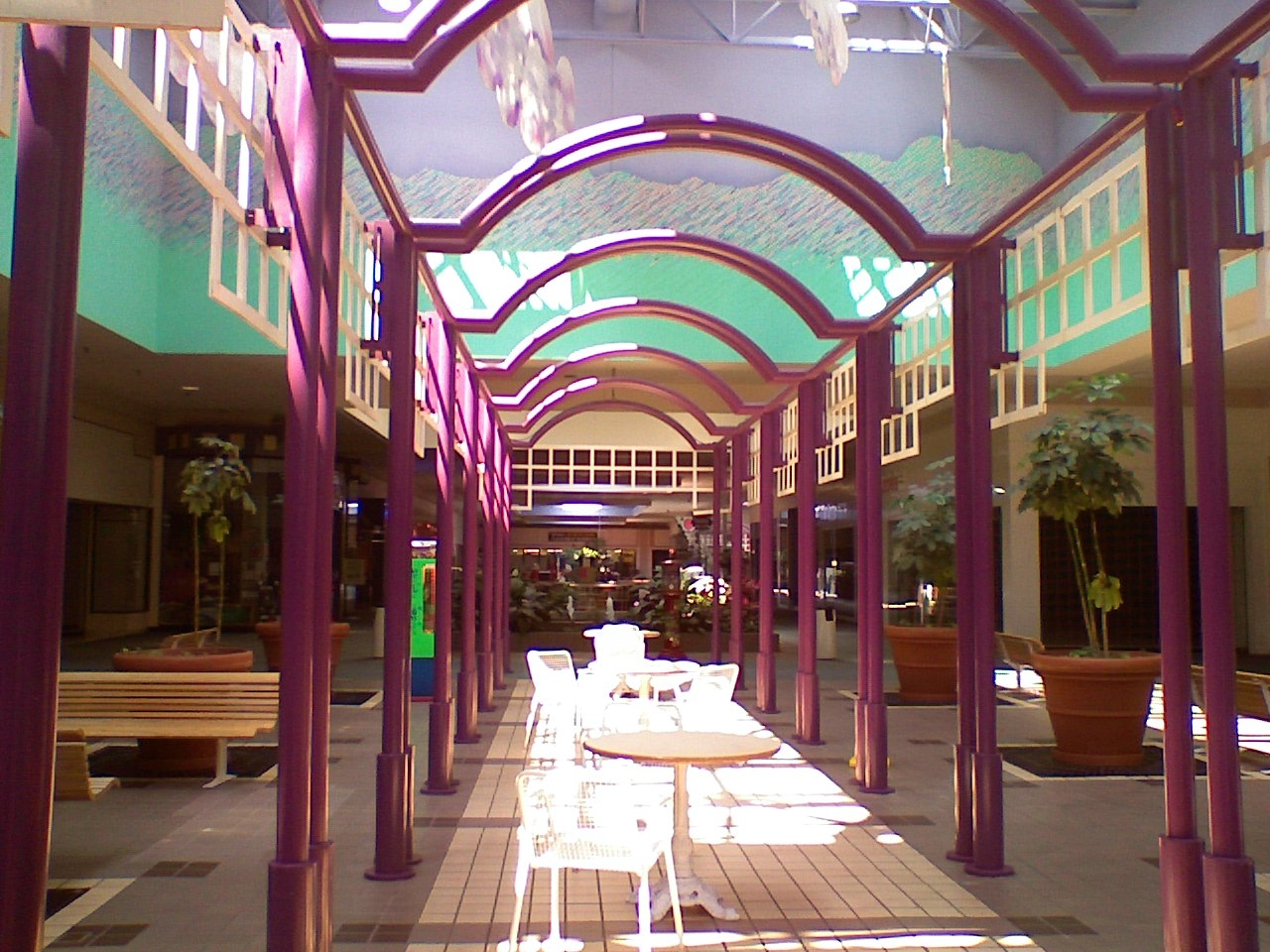
- Woodville Mall center court, looking toward The Andersons, in 2008
- Location: Northwood, Ohio, United States
- Coordinates: 41°36′12.9″N 83°27′39.6″W
- Address: 3725 Williston Rd.
- Opened: 1969
- Closed: December 16, 2011
- Demolished: March 2014
- Developer: Edward J. DeBartolo Corporation
- Owner: Mike Kohan
- Num. of stores: 100+ (at peak)
- Num. of anchor tenants: 4 (at peak)
- Floor area: 778,000 square feet (72,000 m^{2})
- Floors: 1 (2 in former Elder-Beerman)
- Parking: Uncovered, lit parking lot

Woodville Mall is a defunct enclosed regional shopping mall off of Woodville Road (State Route 51) in Northwood, Ohio, outside the city of Toledo. The mall opened in 1969 and, after facing a steep decline throughout the 2000's, closed in December 2011 and was demolished in March 2014.

== History ==
Edward J. DeBartolo Corporation built Woodville Mall in 1969. A portion opened in April of that year, and the rest of the mall opened by year's end. At the time of opening, it had three anchor stores: JCPenney, Sears and Lasalle's.

Macy's, which had owned Lasalle's since 1923, converted their local stores to the Macy's name in 1982, and sold the locations to Elder-Beerman two years later. The Woodville Mall underwent a renovation in 1986, removing the center fountain area; adding a new center court area with skylights, new carpeting, and a food court; and making the mall more "kid friendly". JCPenney closed its store in June 1987 due to declining sales. The store was replaced with a general-merchandise store called The Andersons, which opened on September 1, 1988. After The Andersons opened, many mall merchants reported higher sales, including Spencer Gifts, Kay-Bee Toys and Orange Julius.

F.W. Woolworth Company, also an original tenant of the mall, closed in February 1994 along with three other Woolworth stores in the Toledo area. After this store closed, JCPenney negotiated opening a new store in the space vacated by Woolworth. Woolworth also operated a restaurant adjacent to the store called the Harvest House Cafeteria from the time of the mall opening until 1994.

=== 1990s and 2000s decline ===
Simon Property Group, which merged with DeBartolo in 1996, put Woodville Mall and another mall in Toledo, North Towne Square, up for sale in 1999. Both properties were sold in 2004 to Sammy Kahen and Jack Kashani of California. Most of the mall's inline stores closed in the 2000s; by 2006, fewer than 30 of the mall's 100 spaces were operational. At this point, the mall's owners considered tearing down portions of the mall. Kahen and Kashani's plans for renovation never materialized, leading to the closure of the Elder-Beerman store and movie theater in late 2009. Mike Kohan, a New York real estate investor, bought the mall from Kahen in November 2009 and announced plans to add stores. New stores opened at the mall in 2011, including a sandwich stop, a furniture store and a radio station. Kohan also attempted to sell the mall to Royale Property Management, a New Jersey concern, but the deal failed because it was contingent on the replacement of the structure's roof.

In December 2011, a county judge ordered the mall closed due to structural issues. Among the issues were holes in the roof, water leaking into the mall, a partially failed alarm system, pervasive mold and mildew, and no heat (the mall had not paid the gas bill), forcing some mall tenants to use space heaters — a violation of state fire code. The county sought a permanent injunction to keep the mall closed, and the remaining tenants were told to leave by January 6, 2012. Kohan stated he did not have the money to make the necessary repairs. On June 7, 2012, the closure of the mall was made permanent by a judge, as Kohan had failed to appear at a hearing about the state of the mall. The Andersons and Sears would remain open, but the theater, which has no exterior entrance, was closed.

The mall was scheduled to be demolished at the end of 2012, but the owner had not done so; the City of Northwood was unable to obtain the property from the owner as well.

In November 2012, The Andersons announced the closure of its Woodville location effective February 2013, leaving Sears as the only anchor. According to The Andersons, the main reason for the closure of the 120,000-square-foot (11,000 m^{2}) store was the "serious deterioration of the [mall] structure". The mall was demolished in March 2014, except for the Sears, whose closure was announced the same month.
