= North Towne Square =

Defunct mall in Toledo, Ohio, U.S.

NorthTowne Square
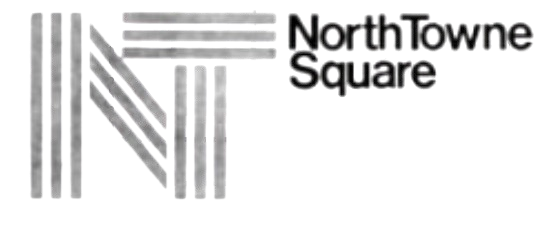

- Main entrance (1997)
- Location: Toledo, Ohio, United States
- Coordinates: 41°43′31″N 83°32′30″W
- Opened: August 7, 1980
- Closed: February 21, 2005
- Demolished: January 2013
- Previous names: Lakeside Centre
- Developer: Melvin Simon & Associates
- Num. of stores: 100+ (at peak)
- Num. of anchor tenants: 3
- Floor area: 758,000 square feet (70,420.5 m^{2})
- Floors: 1 (2 in all anchors)
- Parking: Uncovered parking lot with 4,200 spaces

NorthTowne Square, briefly known as Lakeside Centre, was a regional mall located in Toledo, Ohio that once encompassed over 800,000 square feet (74,000 m^{2}) of retail space. The center was developed by Simon Property Group. At its peak, the mall had over 100 in-line tenants with anchor stores Dillard's, Elder-Beerman, and Montgomery Ward. The mall closed in 2005, with local government acquiring the building in 2011; the mall was completely demolished with the exception of the Montgomery Ward building by 2013.

== History ==
=== Development and opening: 1980-1994 ===
With planning beginning in 1978 by Simon Property Group headquartered in Indianapolis, Indiana, plans called for approximately 1,000,000 square feet (93,000 m^{2}) of space total across the single floor of concourse. North Towne opened on August 7, 1980. The mall upon opening had over 100 in-line shops, and three anchor stores; Lasalle's, The Lion Store, and Montgomery Ward. Wards opened later than the mall, opening its doors on March 10, 1981. There was a fourth un-named anchor planned, and concurrent wing planned, although neither ever came to be.

On October 1, 1981, Lasalle's officially began operating under the Macy's name, following a consolidation of divisions. After only about four years of operations at North Towne, Macy's sold their Toledo area stores to Dayton, Ohio based Elder-Beerman in July 1985.

=== Anchor and ownership changes: 1995-2002 ===
View of interior Dillard's entrance (2000)

Elder-Beerman closed in October 1997, citing poor economic conditions within the mall. In May 1998, The Lion store chain was purchased by Dillard's. By April 1999, all Lion Store locations, including the one at North Towne were re-branded as Dillard's.

In February 2000, less than a year after the chain opened at the mall, Dillard's announced that their location would be closing within 60 days. The mall's movie theater, operated by National Amusements was closed by November 31, 2000. Montgomery Ward closed its store at North Towne in 2001 leaving the mall without any department stores. In August 2002, Simon Property Group held a leasing open house at both malls in which they owned in Toledo; North Towne along with the nearby Woodville Mall. Spaces were offered for as low as $3.00 a square foot, for a single year lease term. Following Wards' closure in 2002, the mall's largest tenant was MC Sports, with approximately 20 other in-line tenants operating inside the mall concourses.

=== Closure and redevelopment: 2003-2022 ===
The mall's pylon after a re-brand as Lakeside Centre

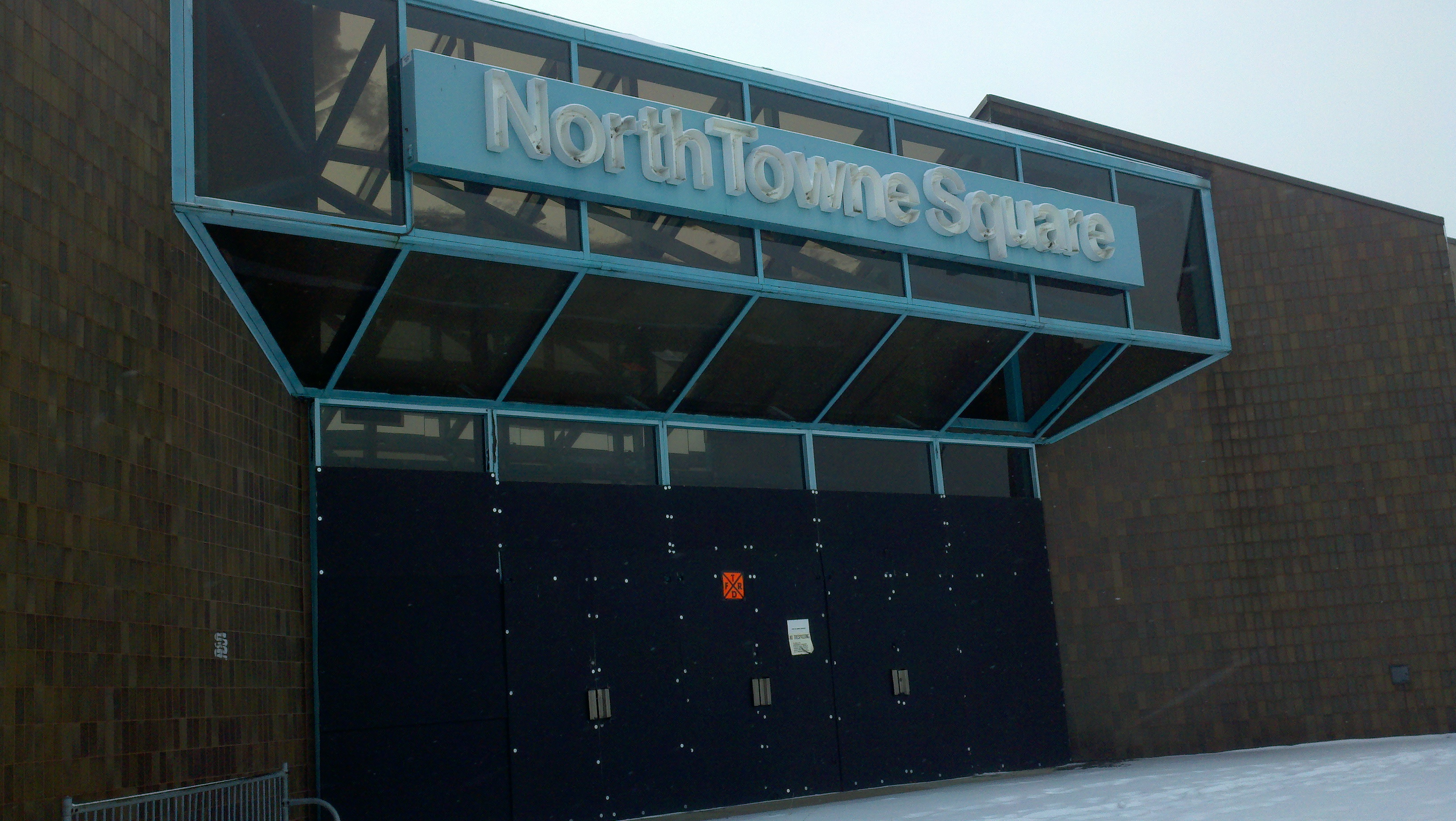
The mall exterior in January 2011

In 2003, the mall was renamed Lakeside Centre as part of a redevelopment plan. In September 2004, the mall was sold by Simon to two California businessmen for $2.5 million. By February of 2005, the entire complex was closed, as its owners decided that electrical costs were too high to keep the largely vacant complex open.

Walmart proposed building a store on the site of the vacant mall in 2007. These plans were opposed by David Ball, candidate for city council.

On February 24, 2010, Toledo issued a Notice of Condemnation by Mayor Mike Bell and David Golis, P.E. Chief of Building. A water main break had damaged adjacent businesses– primarily the Super Fitness Center, in addition to the mall's owners owing delinquent taxes of nearly $86,000. The city ordered the mall's owners, who were based in California, to repair all areas damaged by water as a result of the water line break. The clean-up would include removal of all evidence of mold inside the building.

In April 2012, it was announced that demolition of North Towne Square Mall would commence the following month at a cost of $600,000. Demolition began in January 2013, and was completed several months later. A new wall was added to Super Fitness, making it a stand-alone building. The original floors, parking lot, and lamp posts still remain.

In 2021, the City of Toledo announced the site would be sold to NorthPoint Development with intentions to build a $70 million industrial park with a spring 2022 ground breaking.
