= Lion Store =

Defunct American department store

The Lion Dry Goods Co.
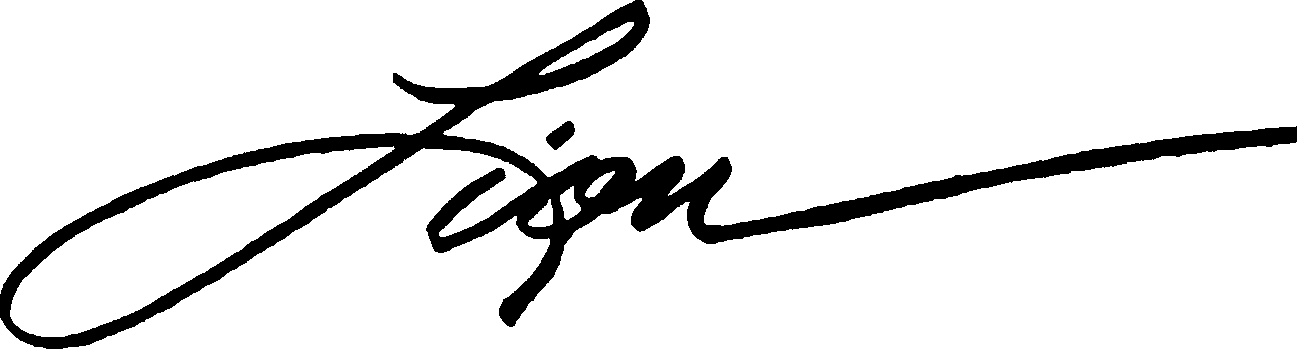
- Company type: Department store
- Industry: Retail
- Founded: 1857
- Defunct: 1999 (Ceased operation as a legal entity in 2006)
- Fate: Merged with Dillard's through Mercantile Stores
- Successor: Dillard's
- Headquarters: Toledo, Ohio
- Products: Clothing, footwear, furniture, jewelry, beauty products, and housewares.
- Parent: Mercantile Stores Company, Inc.
- Website: www.dillards.com

Lion Store (founded in 1857 as Frederick Eaton & Co. and incorporated in 1890 as The Lion Dry Goods Co.) was a Toledo, Ohio department store chain. Mercantile Stores operated the chain from 1914 until its 1998 acquisition by Dillard's, which retired the Lion nameplate in 1999.

Originally established as a downtown-based dry goods retailer, Lion evolved during the post-war period, establishing new stores during Toledo's suburbanization and closing the downtown store in 1980 amid urban decay. By 1998, the chain comprised three fashion apparel stores and two home furnishing stores in area shopping malls targeting middle to upper-middle income consumers.

Long a dominant Toledo retailer, Lion held an estimated thirty to forty percent market share in 1998. The store influenced the growth of Toledo's retail environment, with developers acknowledging that their projects hinged on whether Lion would become an anchor tenant. Lion's outsized influence on local consumers prompted one local retail executive to jokingly remark that "people born in Toledo are born with two things: a Social Security card and a Lion credit card."

== History ==
=== Early years ===
In the mid 19th century, New Englander Frederick Eaton opened up a dry goods store in Toledo. The store made $15,000 in its first year of business, prompting the store, then known as Frederick Eaton & Company to move to a larger location in downtown Toledo. Between 1859 and 1865, Eaton purchased two life-size cast-iron lions and placed them outside the doors of his store. The store's customers began referring to the store as "The Lion Store." The store made a move to its final downtown location in 1866, where the lions followed. The Lion Store became part of H.B. Claflin & Company upon the 1890 death of Eaton. Subsequently, the store was acquired by the Mercantile Stores group.

=== Post-war expansion ===
The company opened up a store in the Westgate Village Shopping Center in 1957, which would, by the 1990s, become a home store, and briefly a Dillard's Home Store before its closure. Another store was opened at Southwyck Shopping Center in 1972. A second Home Store also opened at Southwyck following the close of the Lamsons store there. Both the Southwyck stores closed in the early-to-mid first decade of the 21st century, after brief conversions to Dillard's stores. The downtown store closed in the early 1980s.

=== Later years and Dillard's acquisition ===
In the mid-1980s, Lion Store opened a location at North Towne Square in North Toledo, which was closed in the late 1990s after a brief period as a Dillard's store. In 1993, a store was opened at Franklin Park Mall, which serves under the Dillard's name as the only functioning descendant of the Lion Store today. It is at the Franklin Park Dillard's location where one can see the lion statues, who preside in the store's main atrium.

== Gallery ==
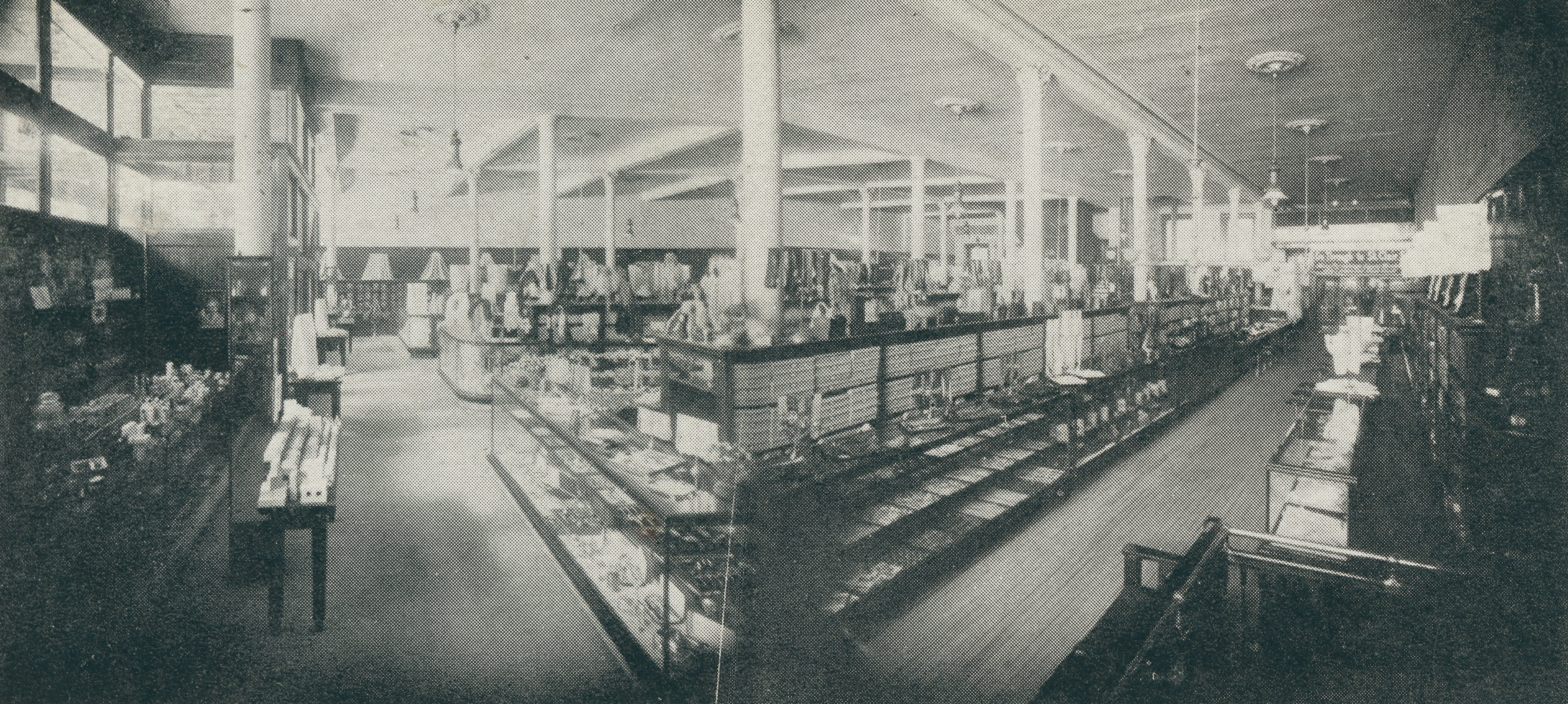
Main floor, Lion Store, Downtown Toledo, 1900s

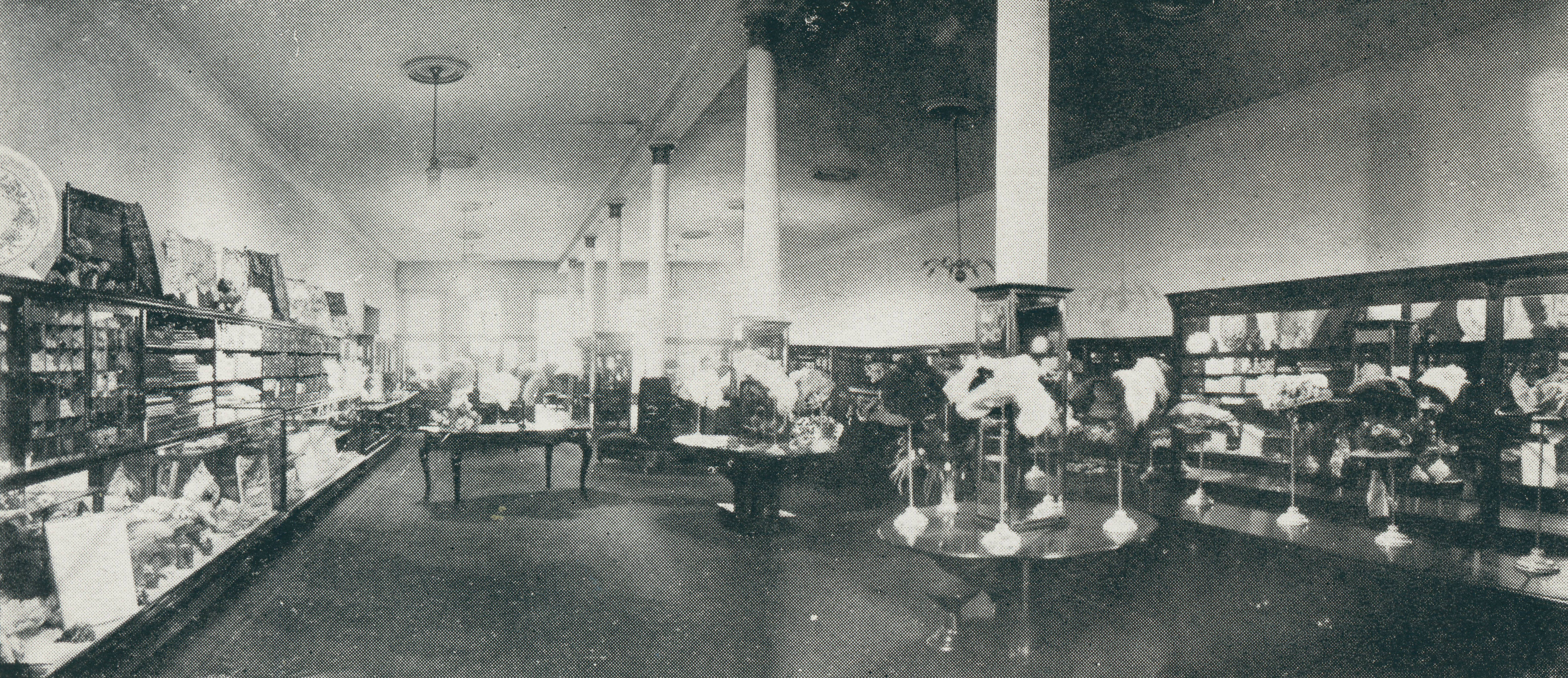
Second floor, millinery department, Lion Store, Downtown Toledo, 1900s

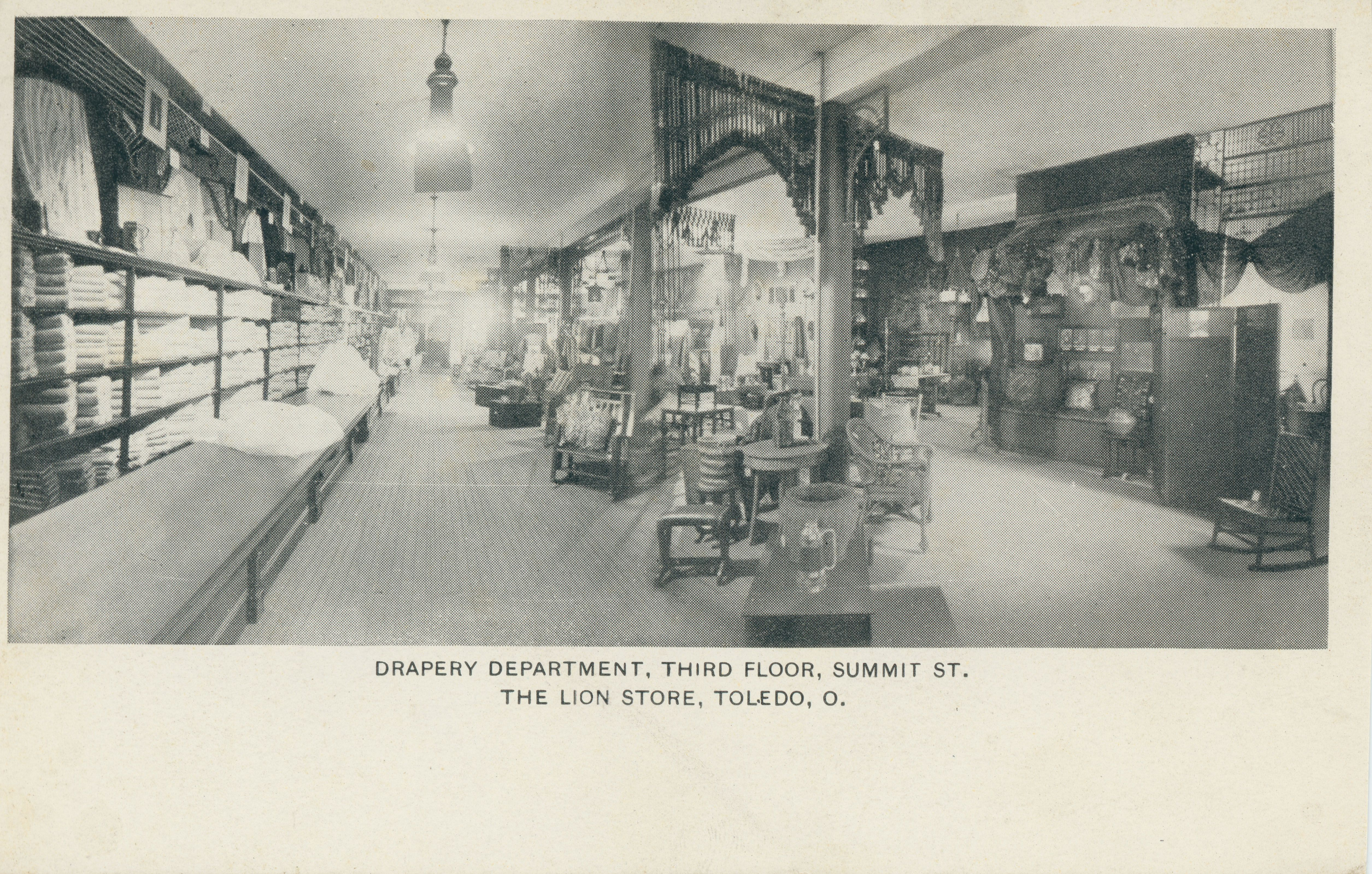
Third floor, drapery department, Lion Store, Downtown Toledo, 1900s

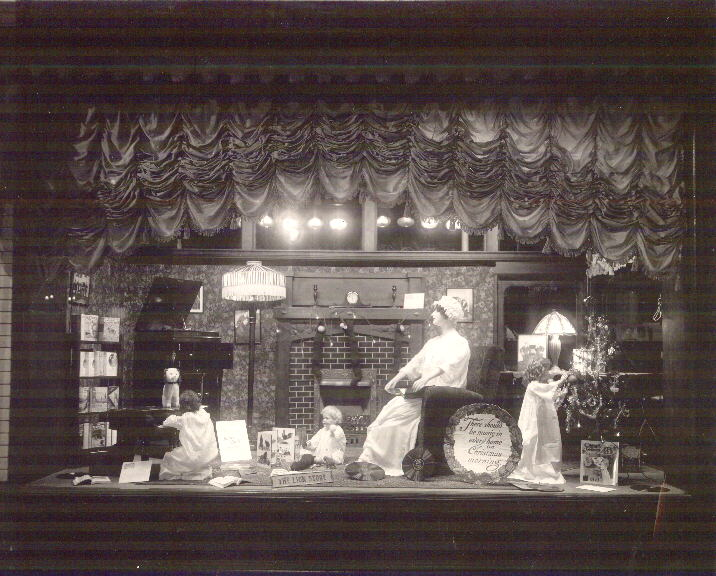
Window Display at the Lion Store, Downtown Toledo, approximately 1915

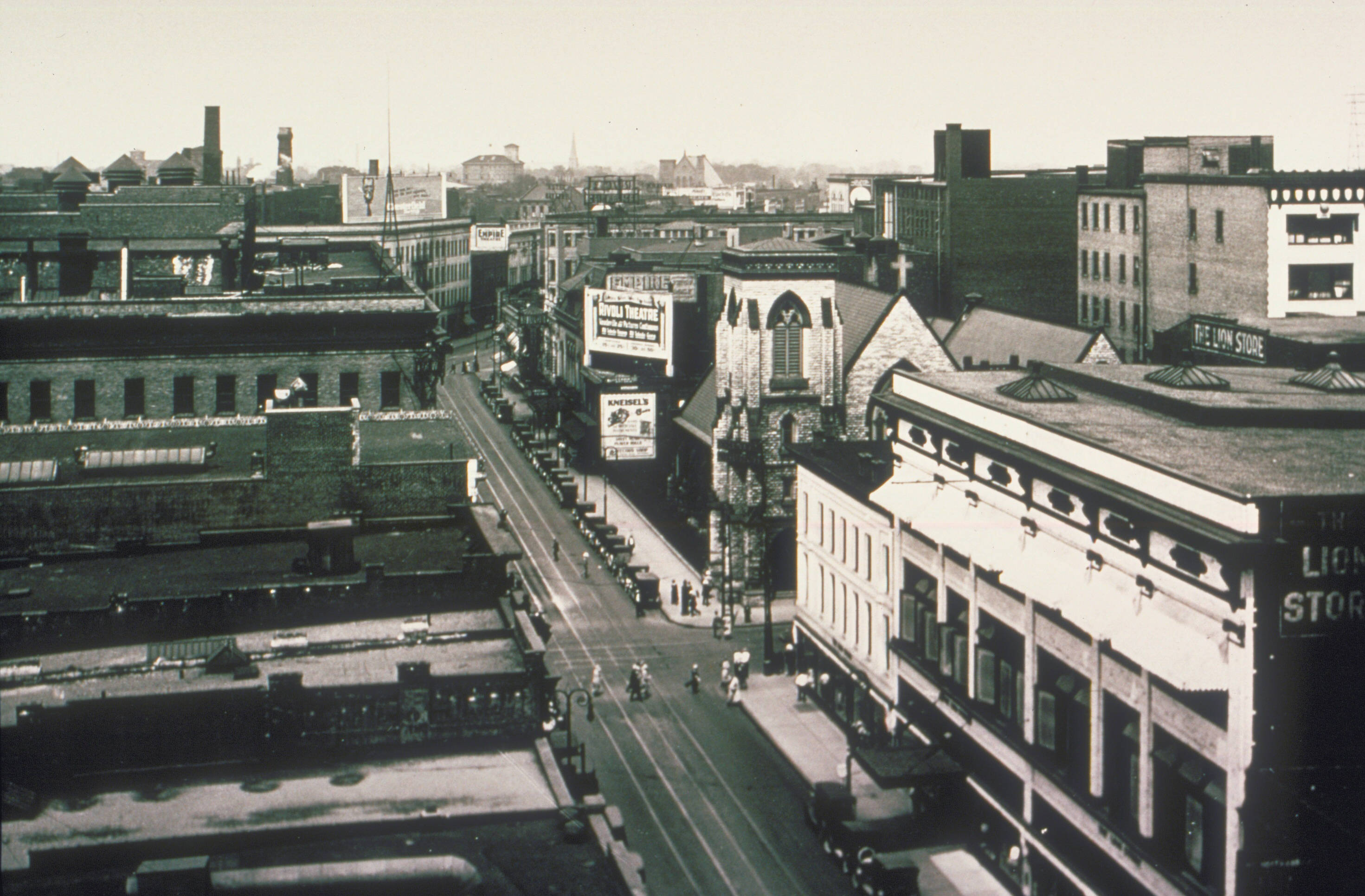
St. Clair and Adams streets with Lion Store at right, undated

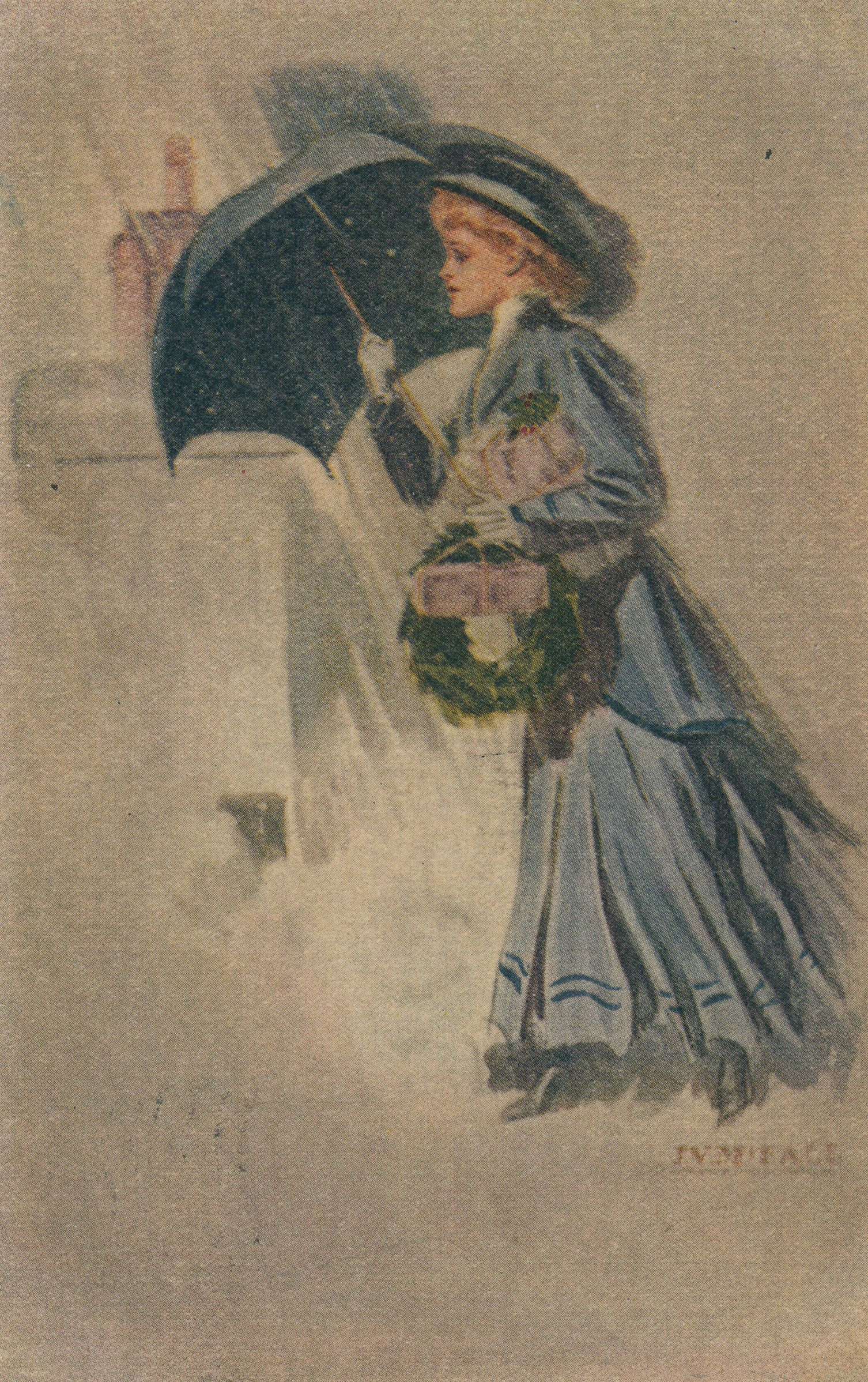
Lion Store postcard advertisement for umbrellas (front), 1908

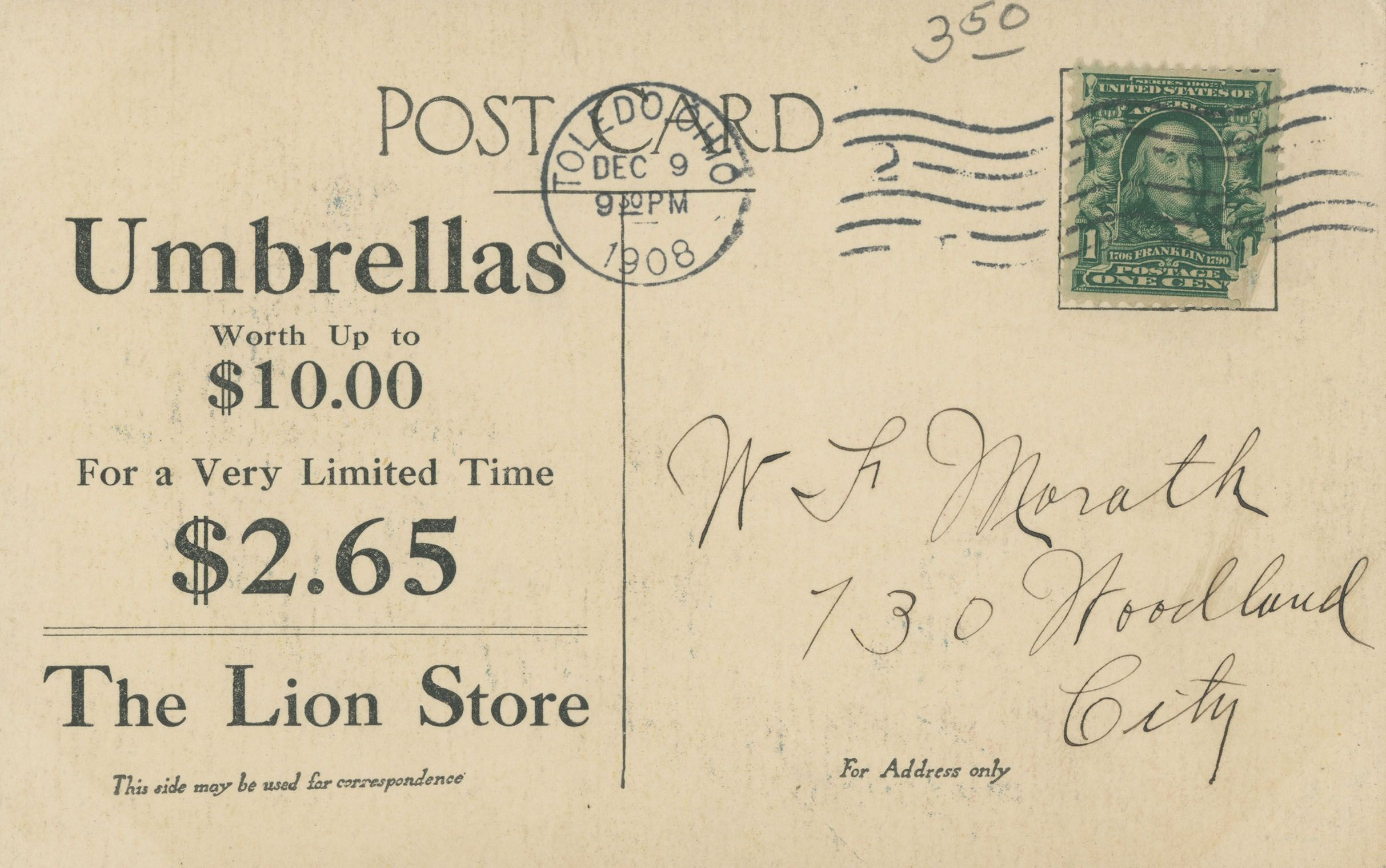
Lion Store postcard advertisement for umbrellas (reverse), 1908

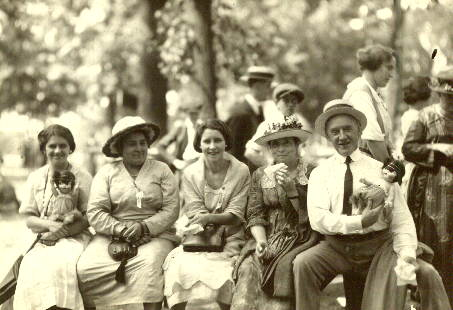
Lion Store employee picnic, approximately 1920

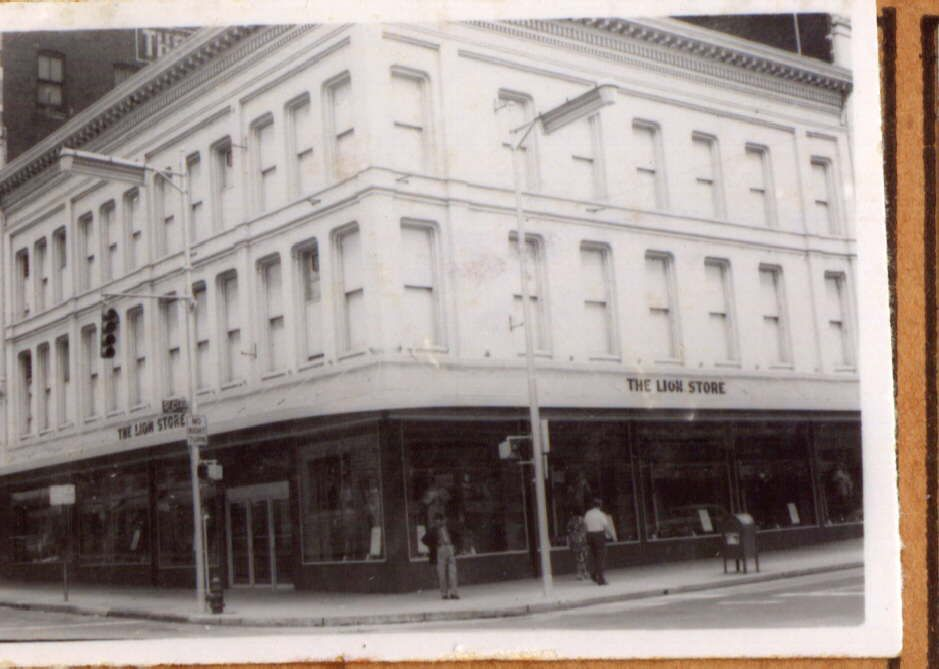
Lion Store in Downtown Toledo, 1935

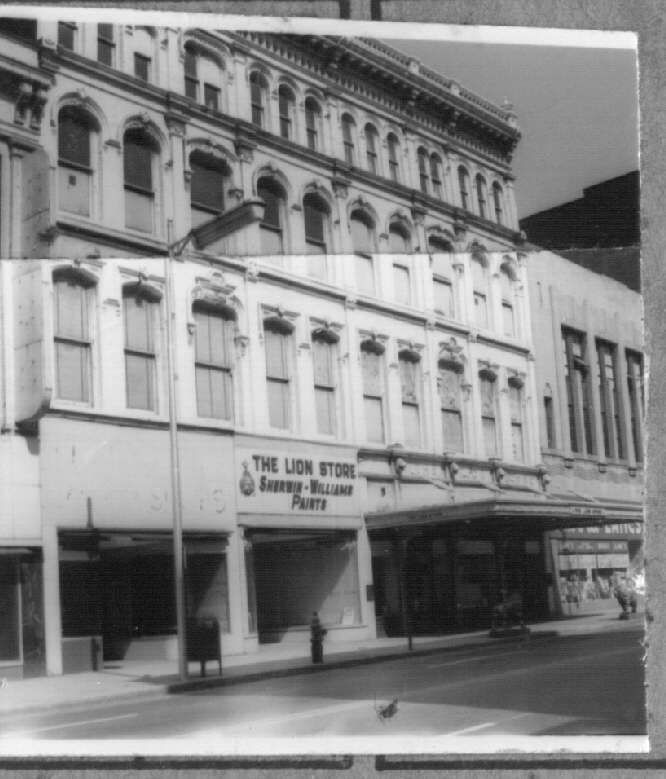
Lion Store entrance with statue lions at right, 1935

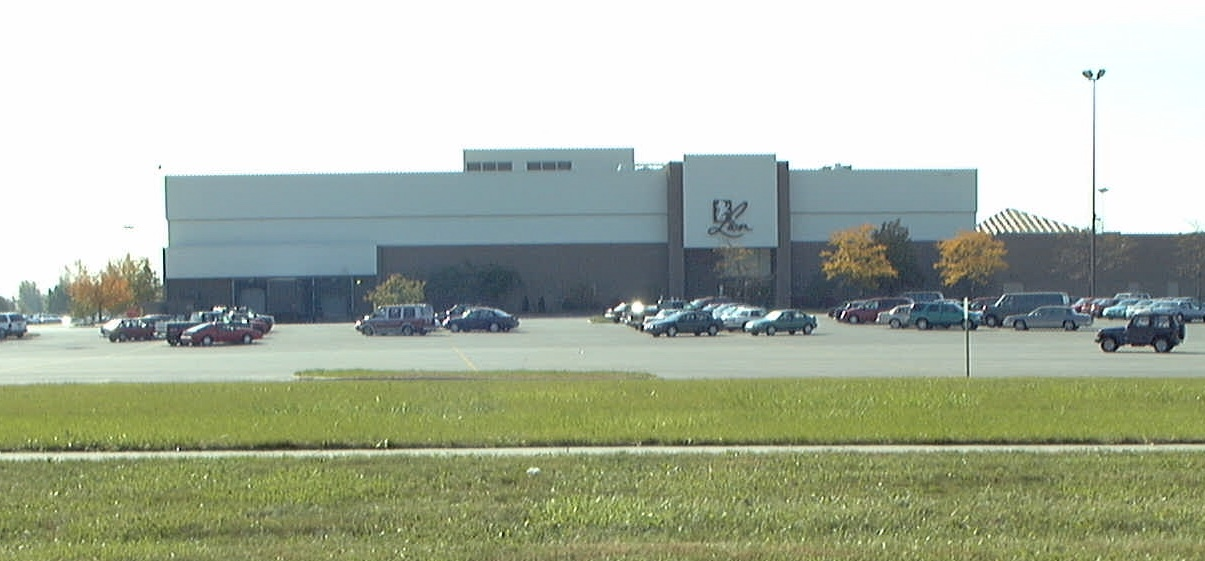
Lion Store at North Towne Square, 1998
