= Old Mill Shopping Center =

- Location: Mountain View, California, United States
- Coordinates: 37°24′20.25″N 122°06′24.94″W
- Opened: 1976
- Closed: 1989
- Demolished: 1994
- Num. of anchor tenants: 1 (AMC)
- Floors: 2

Old Mill Shopping Center (also known as Old Mill Specialty Center) was a shopping center in Mountain View, California. It opened in 1976 and was demolished in 1994.

== History ==
Old Mill Shopping Center opened in 1975. It included a multiplex AMC movie theater and an indoor atrium. The center was later converted into a market concept, which closed in 1989. The property was demolished in 1994.

The former shopping center property was subsequently redeveloped as The Crossings, a residential development consisting of single-family houses and townhouses.

A dispute involving former mall owners John and Patricia Reilly and Plymouth Mountain View resulted in litigation filed in 1994 concerning their financial interests in the redevelopment of the former mall property.
