= Tri-City Pavilions =

Former shopping mall in Mesa, Maricopa County, Arizona, US

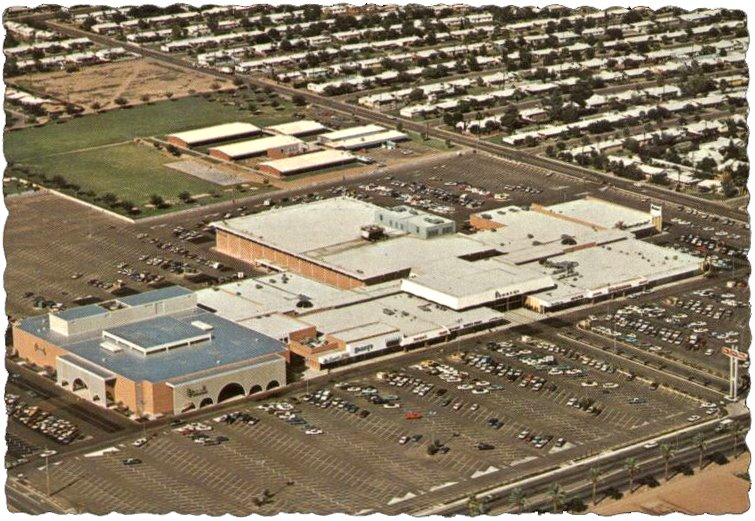
- An aerial photograph of the original Tri-City Mall after the Diamond's opening in 1969
- Location: Mesa, Arizona, U.S.
- Coordinates: 33°25′00″N 111°52′20″W
- Address: 1960 West Main Street
- Opened: August 14, 1968; 58 years ago
- Previous names: Tri-City Mall
- Developer: Malouf Construction and Development Co.
- Owner: Lamar Companies
- Architect: Glenn A. McCollum
- Num. of stores: 50+ (Mall)
- Num. of anchor tenants: 2 (Mall)
- Floor area: 550,000 square feet (51,000 m^{2}) (Mall); 96,656 square feet (8,979.6 m^{2}) (Pavilions)
- Floors: 1

Tri-City Pavilions, formerly Tri-City Mall, is a shopping mall in Mesa, Arizona, United States. It was developed in 1968 as an enclosed shopping mall featuring Diamond's and JCPenney as the anchor stores. The mall underwent a period of decline following the opening of Fiesta Mall in 1979, particularly after Diamond's consolidated with its store in that mall in 1984. Despite a mall-wide renovation completed in 1985 and the addition of new tenants such as ZCMI and Bealls, Tri-City Mall continued to diminish throughout the 1990s, with JCPenney closing in 1998. The mall was demolished in 1999 in favor of a strip mall anchored by Safeway Inc., although the former JCPenney building remained until 2006. Tri-City Pavilions is owned and managed by Lamar Companies.

== History ==
=== Development ===
Malouf Construction and Development Co., a construction company founded by Phoenix retail developer Grant Malouf, first proposed Tri-City Mall in 1963. He had tried to acquire land that the University of Arizona was using as an alfalfa farm, at the corner of West Main Street and Dobson Road, but instead chose a 40-acre (16 ha) plot across the street when it became available. Malouf chose the site because he felt that Mesa, being a tourist destination, was a suitable market for a shopping mall. After acquiring the land, he negotiated with two department store chains, JCPenney and Phoenix-based Diamond's, to become the mall's anchor stores. The center's building costs were estimated at over $10 million. Glenn A. MacCollum was the mall's architect. Alfred M. Tibshraeny Company was general contractor. The name "Tri-City Mall" referred to the three cities expected to draw the most business from the mall: Mesa, Tempe, and Chandler, although Malouf noted that the mall would be the first to service the eastern side of the Phoenix metropolitan area and would be convenient to shoppers from nearby cities such as Scottsdale.

Grand opening ceremonies were held on August 14, 1968, a year after construction started in July 1967. 34 of the 50 stores in the mall opened for business that day, including JCPenney; the Diamond's store was still under construction at the time, with a targeted opening date of late 1969. Malouf held the ribbon-cutting ceremonies that day, with other attendees including Arizona's then-governor Jack Williams and Mesa's then-mayor, Jack Taylor. Other major tenants of the mall included Piccadilly Restaurants, a Bashas' supermarket, a Walgreens drugstore, and an S. H. Kress variety store. One feature of the mall was a 36-foot (11 m)-tall fountain which propelled oil through nylon tubes to simulate the appearance of rain. Other features included 26 light fixtures made of redwood and suspended by chains, as well as dome-shaped skylights. Landscaping around the mall included olive, oleander, and cypress, while the inside of the mall featured palm trees in planters. It was also the only mall in Arizona at the time to feature carpeted flooring in its main entrance. The Diamond's store was designed by Copeland, Novak & Israel of New York. Construction undertaken by Kitchell Contractors, Inc. was completed in July 1969. The store featured large arches and precast decorative screens on its exterior.

=== 1980s–1990s: Decline ===
In 1979, Tri-City Mall began to face competition when Fiesta Mall opened closer to the Superstition Freeway (now part of US 60). During the 1979 Christmas season, many mall merchants such as B. Dalton had reported decreases in sales. Despite this, the mall had only one vacancy at the time, and no tenants had announced plans at the time to move to Fiesta Mall. However, by 1984, Diamond's chose to consolidate its operations into the store at Fiesta Mall, having already reduced operations to just the first level two years prior. In response, local developer Grossman Companies purchased the property from Malouf in late 1984 and announced a $2.5 million renovation plan. Renovations were finished by May 1985. Among the additions were the replacement of the flooring with tile, the addition of wrought iron light poles and park benches, and a new fountain. Following this renovation, only the former Diamond's and one other space in the mall were vacant. By 1987, portions of the former Diamond's building had been taken by local clothing store Winston's, as well as a Cigna health office, along with a food court and four-screen movie theater. The Bashas' also closed and was replaced by a Ben Franklin craft store in 1989.

Zion's Co-operative Mercantile Institution (ZCMI), a Salt Lake City, Utah-based department store chain founded by Brigham Young, chose to open in the former Winston's space in 1990. The Tri-City Mall store was not only the chain's first in Arizona but also among the first in a concept known as ZCMI II, which had debuted two years prior in Utah. This concept featured a smaller footprint than a traditional ZCMI store, selling solely men's and women's brand-name clothing and shoes while lacking other departments typically found in the chain's stores such as children's clothing, linens, housewares, and cosmetics. ZCMI II opened for business in February 1990. A further addition to the mall came in 1991 when Florida-based Bealls opened its first Arizona location there. Despite these additions, the mall continued to dwindle in tenancy throughout the 1990s; one 1993 article noted that Fiesta had "decimated" Tri-City Mall. By 1992, ZCMI had converted the Tri-City Mall store from the ZCMI II format to an outlet store.

In 1996, another Phoenix-based developer named Rubin Cos. bought the mall from Grossman and announced further renovation plans. Rubin representatives noted that Tri-City Mall had continued to decline in tenancy following the opening of Superstition Springs Center in 1990, and would likely continue to lose business after Arizona Mills' opening in 1997; another factor in the mall's decline was its distance from a major freeway or direction of residential growth. Despite reducing rent costs, Rubin Cos. was unable to secure new tenants for the mall for these reasons. JCPenney closed its store at the mall in 1998; the store was profitable, but the chain did not want to sign a new long-term lease agreement, and it had been actively pursuing moving its store to a proposed expansion of Fiesta Mall. By the time of JCPenney's closure, only six tenants remained: Bealls, Walgreens, Radio Shack, GNC, Furr's cafeteria, and a clothing store called Western Village. JCPenney had stalled redevelopment proposals being made by the Rubin Cos.; after it departed, Rubin announced that the entire structure would be demolished, except for the JCPenney building, in favor of a new strip mall called Tri-City Pavilions.

=== Late 1990s–present: Redevelopment into Tri-City Pavilions ===
Reconstruction of the mall into Tri-City Pavilions ensued in 1999, with a Safeway supermarket confirmed that year as a new anchor store. Demolition of the old center featured a harrowing moment when a man's foot became pinned in an upside-down Bobcat loader. Tri-City Pavilions officially reopened for business in 2000, and was sold to J.G. Management in 2006. The last standing Tri-City Mall store, the former JCPenney building, was demolished in April 2006 to make way for the Sycamore/Main Street Valley Metro Rail transit station, which was the original eastern terminus of the rail line; the station features a park and ride parking lot north of Main Street and east of the new mall for light rail commuters to park their cars.

In 2021, Mesa issued a $2.3 million tax subsidy to a company, Dobson Properties Sub-Fund, who will build 245 market-rate apartments on part of the parking lot. A second project in another portion of the lot, "Sycamore Station", was approved in 2016 with approval reaffirmed in 2021.
