= Metrocenter (Phoenix, Arizona) =

Former mall in NE Phoenix, AZ

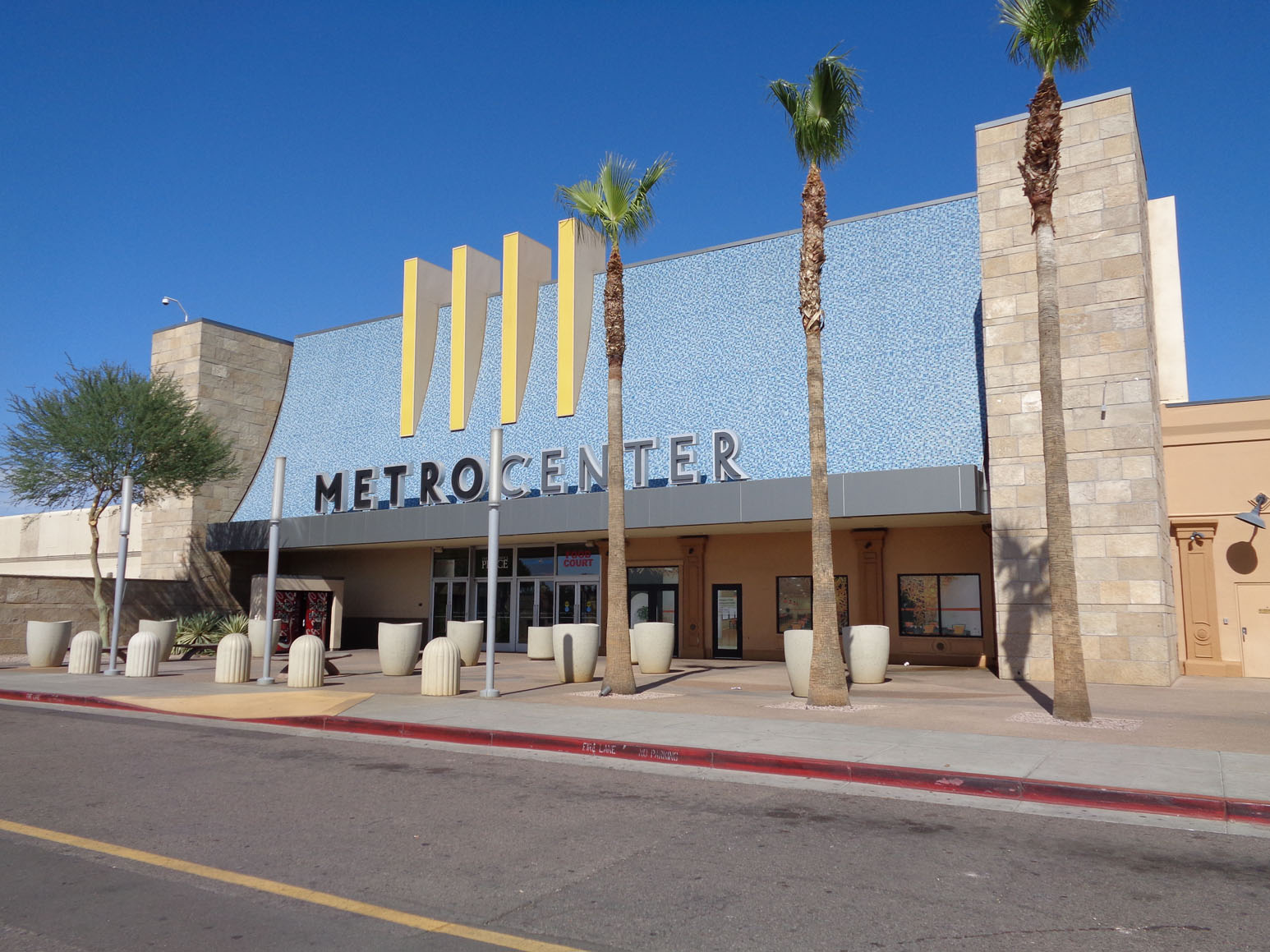
- The west side entrance to Metrocenter on August 16, 2017.
- Location: Phoenix, Arizona, United States
- Coordinates: 33.5750°N 112.1215°W
- Address: 9617 North Metro Parkway West
- Opened: October 1973
- Closed: June 30, 2020
- Developer: Westcor and Homart Development Company
- Owner: Carlyle Development Group
- Architect: Flatow, Moore, Bryan & Fairburn
- Num. of stores: 175 at peak
- Num. of anchor tenants: 6 at peak
- Floor area: 1,400,000 square feet (130,000 m^{2}) (GLA)
- Floors: 2
- Website: metrocentermall.com

Metrocenter was a regional enclosed shopping mall in northwest Phoenix, Arizona. It was bounded by Interstate 17, 31st, Dunlap and Peoria avenues. Before its closure, the three most recently open anchor stores were Harkins Theatres, Walmart Supercenter, and Dillard's Clearance Center; three additional vacant anchor stores included former Sears, JCPenney, and Macy's locations. The mall featured 100 stores, a 12 screen movie theater, and a food court. Since January 2021, the mall had been owned by the Carlyle Development Group based in New York City. The mall officially closed on June 30, 2020.

Parts of the film Bill and Ted's Excellent Adventure were filmed in the mall.

== History ==
=== Development ===
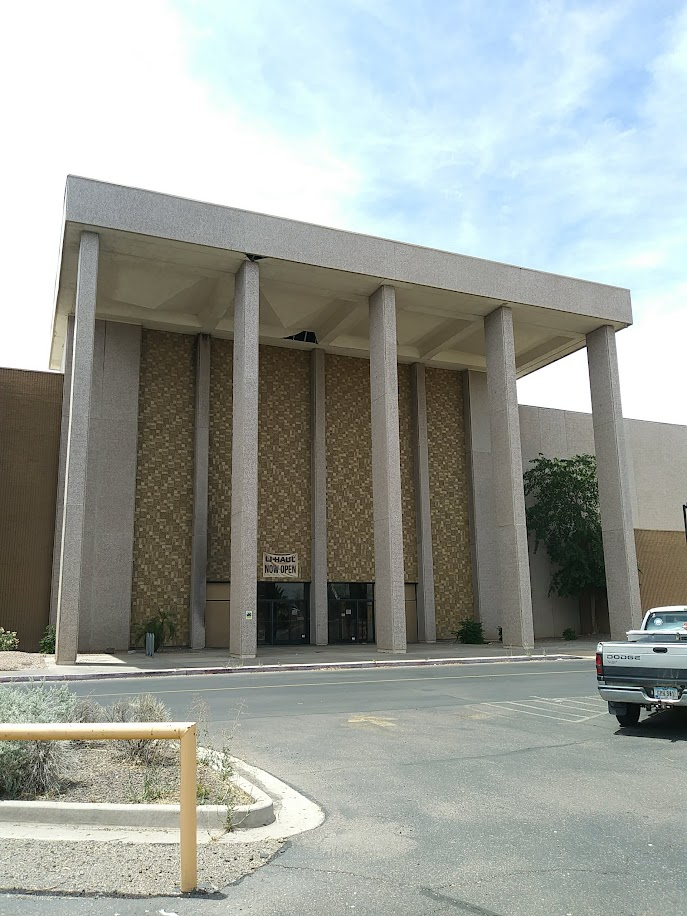
Former Macy's (originally Goldwater's) June 2021

Metrocenter was a joint venture of Westcor, a regional shopping center development firm headed by a group of real estate investors and developers led by Russ "Rusty" Lyon Jr., and Homart Development Company, the real estate division of Sears, Roebuck and Company. The project was announced in November 1970, the first site plans and artist renderings announced in the spring of 1972, and construction beginning in June 1972. The mall would be anchored by five department stores, Sears, Rhodes Brothers, Diamond's, Goldwater's, and The Broadway.

The mall was designed by Flatow, Moore Bryan & Fairburn, Robert Fairburn who headed the Phoenix offices of the firm was project architect. Ernest W. Hahn was general contractor selected to build the mall. The Goldwater's building was designed by Chaix & Johnson Associates of Los Angeles. Goldwater's featured unique ceramic tiles on its exterior that were manufactured by Franciscan Interpace Ceramics. The Diamond's store was designed by Robert Young & Associates of Dallas as a dynamic modern structure with a southwestern influence. Kitchell Contractors, Inc. of Phoenix handled construction of Goldwater's as well as Diamond's. Rhodes Brothers was designed by the Los Angeles firm of Victor Gruen Associates. It featured desert sand colored walls and a glass enclosed elevator. The Broadway building was designed by Los Angeles architect Charles Luckman, and was constructed by the Del E. Webb Corporation.

The 1,400,000-square-foot (130,000 m^{2}) mall was built on 312 acres (1.26 km^{2}) in an area of Phoenix that was a sparsely populated residential district at what was then considered the northern edge of town (the area was actually an unincorporated part of Maricopa County which was annexed by the city of Phoenix because of the project). Lyon's firm correctly noted that population growth would favor northwest Phoenix. After the site was chosen, "...from then on, it was a matter of appealing to the marketing acumen of the major department stores. They didn't take much convincing."

There was some initial opposition to the project from neighborhood residents who feared heavy traffic generated from major retailers as well as buildings which exceeded height limits. As a result, there were some delays in the rezoning of the land by the city of Phoenix, but residents' fears were eventually addressed to their satisfaction. A lawsuit filed by the "Deer Valley Residents Association" was dropped by late September 1972.

In June 1972, the First National Bank of Arizona (now the Arizona operations of Wells Fargo Bank) made a $21 million loan to the developers, which was the largest commercial real estate loan ever made in Arizona up to that time. The total cost of Metrocenter was estimated at $100 million.

The mall was opened for business on October 1, 1973, and when it opened as the first two-level, five-anchor mall in the U.S., it was the largest shopping center in Arizona and was considered one of the largest shopping centers in the United States. Shoppers initially came from as far away as Flagstaff and Tucson to see and to shop at the large mall.

Metrocenter became the model for later Westcor master-planned developments around Phoenix, such as Paradise Valley Mall.

=== Decline and renovations ===
The mall started to decline economically after the 1980s; as the Phoenix area expanded, many of the immediate residential neighborhoods bordering Metrocenter became less middle-class/upscale and more working-class in demographics. Newer malls, such as Paradise Valley Mall and Fiesta Mall seized market share from Metrocenter in the Phoenix Metropolitan Area. In addition to increased competition, crime in the mall's neighborhood and parking lot increased. Local car enthusiasts started cruising the mall in the early ‘80s, driving their cars around the property and socializing. Later Phoenix Police began blocking traffic for the "cruisers", which also inconvenienced mall goers and led to a decline in weekend patronage.

In 1992–93 Metrocenter underwent a renovation designed by San Diego–based Callison Architecture. The work was completed by The Weitz Company General Contractors.

In January 2004, Metrocenter was sold by DVM Co., a joint venture of Simon Property Group and Rusty Lyon Jr., to a joint venture of The Macerich Company and AEW Capital Management. The new ownership brought back the founding developer, Westcor, by now an Arizona retail giant and subsidiary of The Macerich Co., to manage the property.

In 2005, several of the mall's retail stores that appeared in Bill and Ted's Excellent Adventure, such as Oshman's Sporting Goods and Casual Corner, closed in accordance with the chains' foldings, and were replaced by newer stores. Facing large vacancies, in 2005–2006, the exterior of the mall was improved. The parking lot was repaved and 35 percent more lighting was added. New "Metrocenter" signs were placed above the mall's entrances. More than 300 trees were removed (most of them eucalyptus) and desert-friendly landscaping was planted.

Metrocenter's interior was revamped in 2007. Diaper-changing stations and attendants were added to the restrooms. A nursing room, Wi-Fi access, and a community room with seating for up to 100 were added to the mall. The food court and play center were remodeled. In November 2007, a closed-circuit camera television system was installed that is sophisticated enough to read the license plate number of any car in the mall's parking lot. Public view monitors were installed at the entrances to the mall showing that entrance to people as they entered the mall.

On April 6, 2010 Jones Lang LaSalle took over management and 15% ownership of Metrocenter Mall from Westcor.

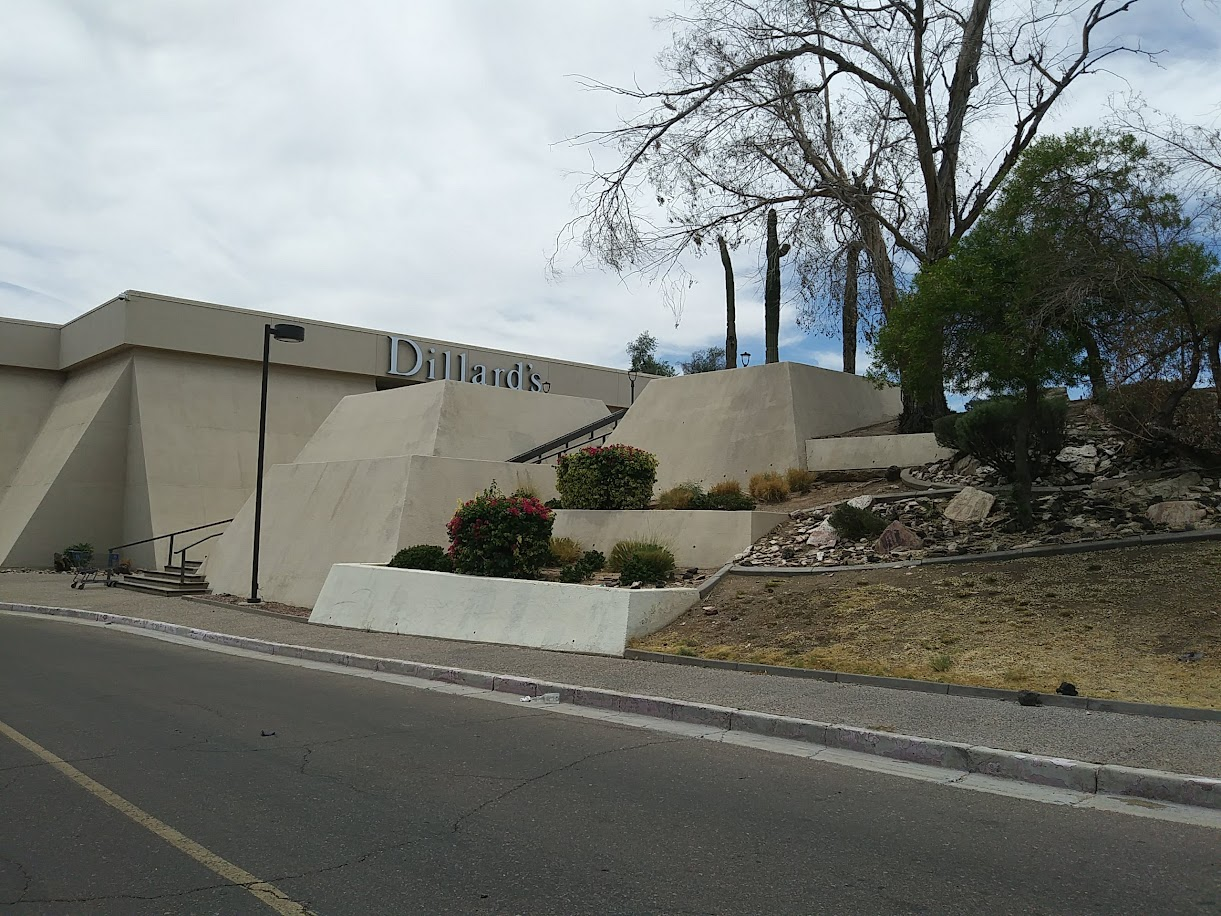
Former Dillard's (originally Diamond's) June 2021

=== Redevelopment and closure ===
Later in 2010, the mall was put up for sale and in January 2012, the sale to the Carlyle Development Group for $12.2 million was finalized. The company had publicly stated that over a period of five to six years, it hoped to turn the property into a mixed-use development site, with retail, residential, medical and possibly college campus tenants.

In June 2016, a massive redevelopment of Metrocenter was approved by the Phoenix City Council. Metrocenter will undergo a massive revitalization that will bring more retail and restaurants as well as office buildings, apartments, senior housing, and health-care facilities to the mall. The City of Phoenix rezoned the mall to allow office, medical and residential space; it had been zoned for solely retail use. Metro Parkway station on the B Line of the Valley Metro Rail & Streetcar system opened on the former mall property on January 27, 2024.

In a letter from general manager Kim Ramirez on June 19, 2020, Metrocenter Mall announced that they would be closing at the end of that month citing "the drop in our occupancy levels due to the COVID-19 pandemic. After 47 years of service, Metrocenter Mall was closed on June 30, 2020, due to low store occupancy levels following the COVID-19 pandemic, and failed rejuvenation projects to boost foot traffic. Remains of the mall were auctioned off on December 3, 2020. A farewell celebration for Metrocenter—featuring a screening of Bill & Ted's Excellent Adventure—was held on May 21, 2023.

Demolition began on November 18, 2024, and was completed by September 2025 (excluding the former Sears, which remains separately owned by the Sears company and will be demolished at a later date). An $850 million redevelopment project, known as The Metropolitan, will replace the mall with other retail space, office space, apartments, townhouses, restaurants, an amphitheater, a park plaza, a splash pad, and a weekly farmers market on the 64 acres (26 ha) site. Construction of The Metropolitan is set to begin in April 2026.

== Anchors ==
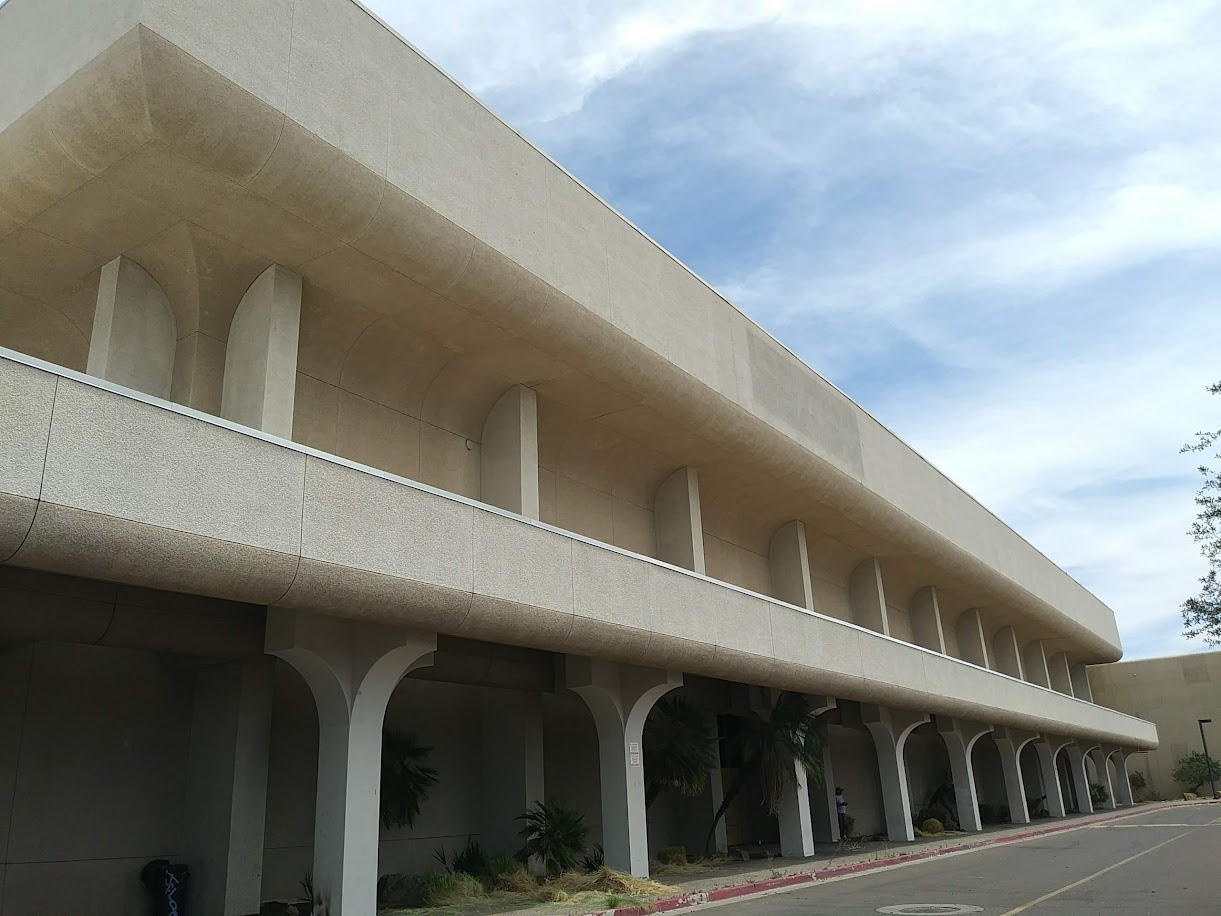
Former Sears, June 2021

The original anchor stores were Sears, Rhodes Brothers, Diamond's, Goldwater's, and The Broadway. All of the anchors opened in 1973, with the exception of Sears which opened in 1974. The mall had an ice skating rink on the ground level overlooked by the mall's food court, which was designed to resemble the fuselage of an airliner.

The ice rink closed in 1990, the large space where it once sat was filled, and the balcony that overlooked it was filled to house more seating in the food court. The food court was also redesigned and now no longer resembles an airliner fuselage. In 1974, the mall opened a triple-screen movie theater by General Cinema Corporation. The theater was acquired by Harkins Theatres in March 1999, the original theater was located next to the current Phoenix public library behind the mall the new theater was put under the food court where the ice ring was.

Over time, the mall's anchors have changed as a result of acquisitions and consolidation amongst department stores. Diamond's was converted to Dillard's in 1984. Rhodes Brothers was converted to Liberty House in 1974, then to Joske's in 1984. After Joske's was acquired by Dillard's in early 1987, the location became a second Dillard's, and then a JCPenney. JCPenney moved to Christown Spectrum Mall in 2007 and left the former location of JCPenney vacant until Metrocenter's ultimate closure, when it became a Life Storage.

The Broadway was acquired by Federated Department Stores in 1996, and converted to a Macy's. Goldwater's was converted to J.W. Robinson's in 1989, which became Robinsons-May in 1993. In 2005, Macy's closed its store at the former Broadway site, which returned to the mall a year later, at the Robinsons-May building after the May Department Stores were acquired by Macy's in 2006. In January 2015, Macy's announced it was closing its Metrocenter location for the second time in ten years by early spring, citing a nationwide reorganization. The store closed in June.

Dillard's was converted to a clearance center in 2009, closing the first level of its store.

In June 2014, it was announced that a Walmart Supercenter would open, taking over the space occupied by the vacant Broadway building. The Broadway building was demolished and construction for the Supercenter began on July 20, 2016. The new Supercenter opened in October 2017, though it is not accessible from the mall.

On May 31, 2018, it was announced that Sears would be closing in September 2018 as part of a plan to close 72 stores nationwide, which left the mall without any original anchors. Only Dillard's Clearance Center and Walmart (which has no mall entrance) were the remaining anchors until Dillard's closed in 2023.

On February 22, 2023, it was announced that Dillard's Clearance Center would be closing as part of a plan to close 3 stores nationwide. Dillard's Clearance Center closed on April 15, 2023.

On May 29, 2023, Harkins Theatres closed their Metrocenter location permanently, leaving Walmart and CubeSmart Self Storage, the latter located inside the former JCPenny, as the last remaining businesses on the property. The CubeSmart is not set for demolition and is the only original portion of the mall still standing.
