= Diamond's =

Former Arizona based department store

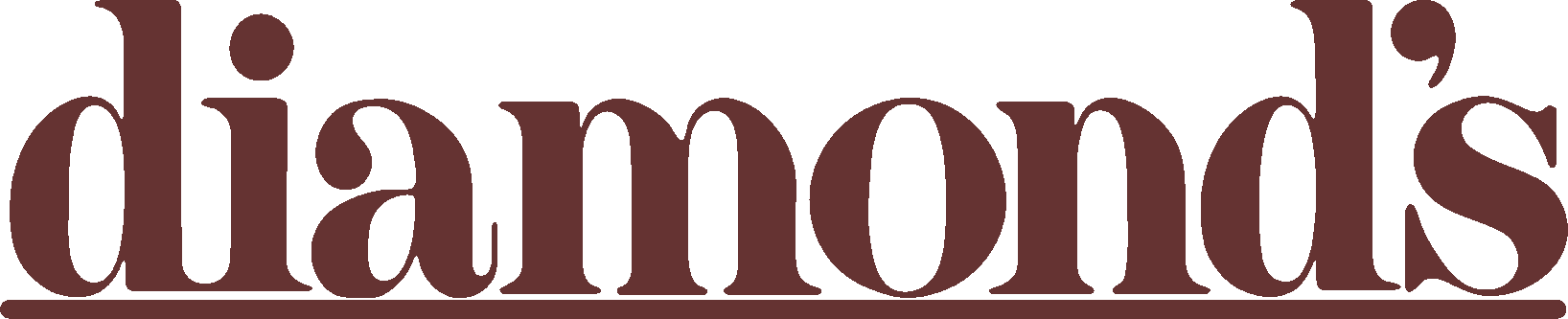
- Formerly: The Boston Store (1897–1947)
- Company type: Public
- Industry: Retail
- Founded: 1897
- Founders: Nathan and Isaac Diamond
- Defunct: 1984
- Fate: Acquired by Dillard's
- Headquarters: Phoenix, Arizona
- Number of locations: 12 (1984)
- Area served: Southwestern US
- Key people: Nathan and Isaac Diamond
- Products: Clothing, footwear, bedding, furniture, jewelry, beauty products
- Parent: Roberts Brothers (1957–1968), Dayton-Hudson Corporation (1968–1984)

Diamond's was a department store chain headquartered in Phoenix, Arizona, that operated from 1897 to 1984. Originally named The Boston Store, it was founded by brothers Nathan and Isaac Diamond.

== History ==
Logo timeline

The Boston Store was founded in 1897 by brothers Nathan and Isaac Diamond, Jewish immigrants who had in 1891 begun a dry-goods mercantile in El Paso called The New York Store. Hearing of great potential in Arizona, the brothers moved to Phoenix. They set up a store on Washington Street in Downtown Phoenix. By 1941, the Diamond brothers had enlisted the help of family to run the store. Nathan's sons, Harold and Bert, and Isaac's son, Herbert, were all involved with management of the store. The Boston Store was renamed Diamond's in 1947 to mark the store's 50th anniversary. Harold and Ralph Diamond eventually took over the ownership. Roberts Brothers of Portland, Oregon purchased Diamond's in 1957. That same year, the store opened its first branch location at Park Central Mall. The building on Washington Street was subsequently closed. In 1962, the firm considered expanding into the Tucson market but would hold off on doing so until 1974. In 1968, Diamond's was sold to Dayton Corporation of Minneapolis. In 1970, Diamond's acquired Las Vegas based Ronzone's and converted its store at The Boulevard Mall to a Diamond's. On January 14, 1984, Diamond's consolidated its operations in Mesa by closing its Tri-City Mall location due to its close proximity to the newer Fiesta Mall location. Diamond's had expanded to twelve stores throughout the Southwest when in September 1984 then owner, Dayton-Hudson Corporation, sold the chain to Dillard's.

== Locations ==
The locations of the former Diamond's department stores. The Original Flagship Store on Washington Street operated from 1897 to 1957.

Mall	Location	Opened	Subsequent use
Park Central Mall	Phoenix, AZ	August 25, 1957	Converted to Dillard's, now medical offices
Thomas Mall	Phoenix, AZ	September 23, 1963	Converted to Dillard's, later demolished
Tri-City Mall	Mesa, AZ	August 7, 1969	Closed January 14, 1984, later demolished
The Boulevard Mall	Las Vegas, NV	1968 as Ronzone's, 1970 as Diamond's	Converted to Dillard's
Metrocenter Mall	Phoenix, AZ	October 1, 1973	Converted to Dillard's then Dillard's Clearance, now vacant
Scottsdale Fashion Square	Scottsdale, AZ	Spring 1974	Converted to Dillard's then Sears, now Macy's
Park Place Mall	Tucson, AZ	August 5, 1974	Converted to Dillard's later demolished and replaced with new Dillard's
Meadows Mall	Las Vegas, NV	1978	Converted to Dillard's, now Dillard's Clearance on upper level and Curacao on lower level.
Paradise Valley Mall	Phoenix, AZ	February 1, 1979	Converted to Dillard's then Sears, later demolished
Fiesta Mall	Mesa, AZ	July 4, 1980	Converted to Dillard's then Dillard's Clearance, later demolished
Fashion Show Mall	Las Vegas, NV	February 14, 1981	Converted to Dillard's, now Forever 21
Tucson Mall	Tucson, AZ	July 30, 1981	Now Dillard's
Desert Sky Mall	Phoenix, AZ	December 1981	Converted to Dillard's, now Dillard's Clearance
