= Ronzone's =

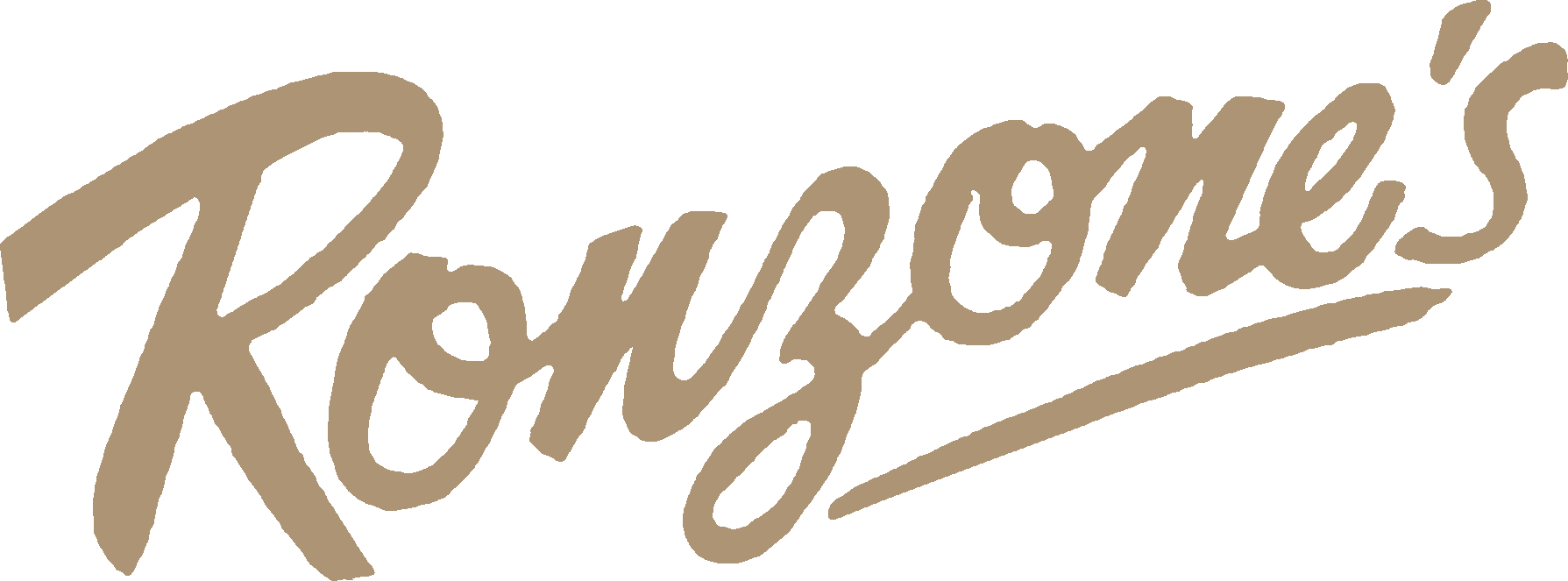
Ronzone's logo

Ronzone's was a local department store in Las Vegas and Tonopah, Nevada. In 1904, in the mining settlement of Manhattan, Nevada, "Mom" Ronzone first started selling socks to miners. In 1917 she opened a store in Manhattan, but due to the decline in that town's economy, moved to Tonopah and opened a store there in 1920. She and her family opened branches in Silver Peak, Nevada and Beatty, Nevada in the 1920s.

In 1929, Ronzone's opened a branch at First and Carson in Las Vegas, selling women's and children's clothing. In Las Vegas they moved to ever-larger quarters and in 1938 expanded the format to that of a full department store, the largest in Southern Nevada. They settled into their final location at 416 Fremont Street in 1946. In 1938 Ronzone's husband died and her daughter Amy and husband Al Adams moved from Tonopah to help "Mom" run the Las Vegas business and in 1939 the Ronzones sold the Tonopah store.

In March 1968 Ronzone's opened a 40,000-square-foot (3,700 m^{2}) store in Las Vegas' first mall, The Boulevard Mall, double the size of their downtown store. In 1970, Ronzone's was bought by Dayton Hudson Corporation, and ran as a Phoenix-based Diamond's, which later was acquired by Dillard's in 1984.

== Related businesses ==
The family bought the Gray-Reid department store in Reno, Nevada in 1943. Daughter Esther opened a department store in Yerington, Nevada, The Emporium.
