= The Boulevard Mall =

Shopping Mall in Las Vegas Valley

Coordinates: 36°07′26″N 115°08′09″W

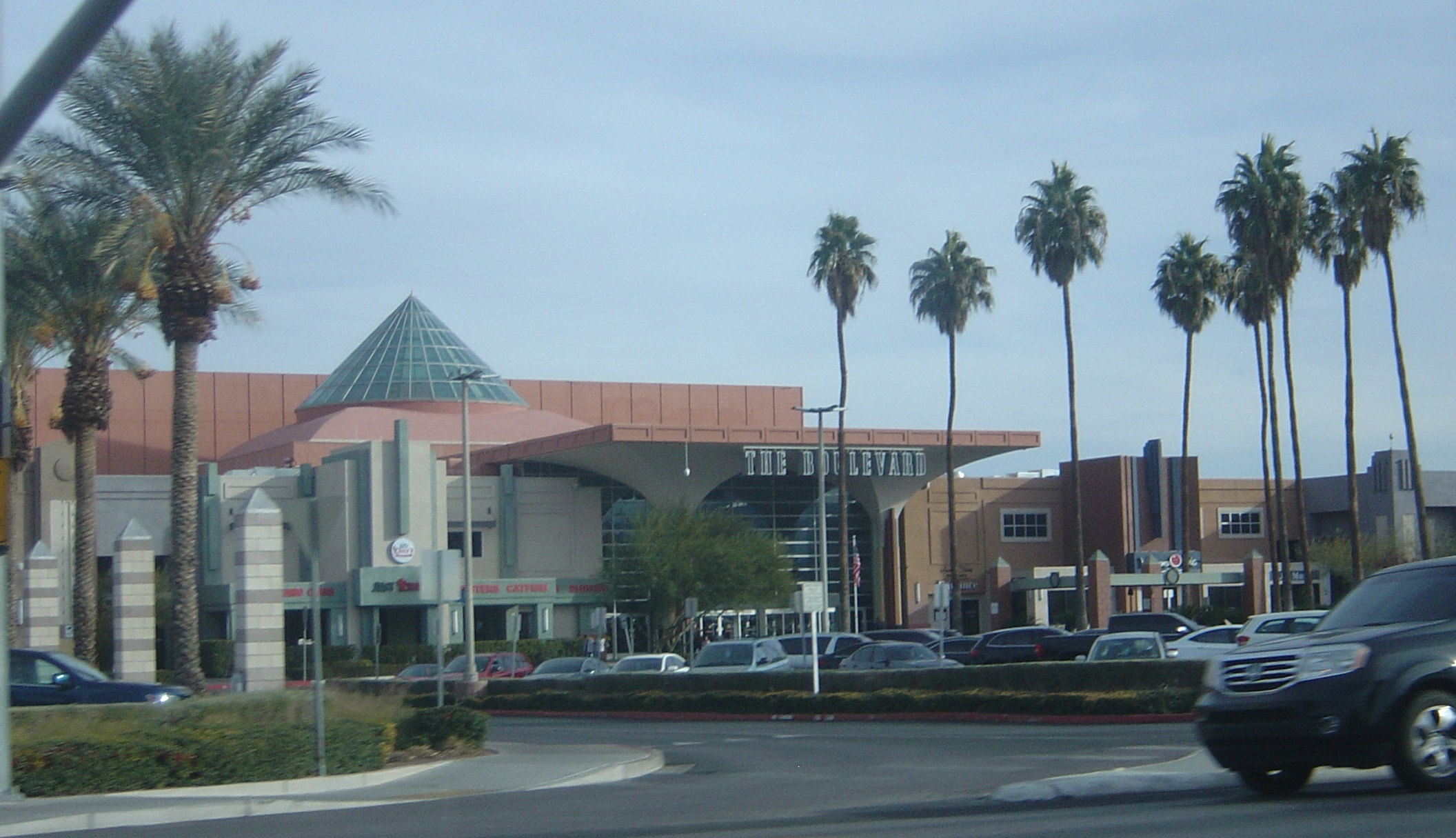
- The Boulevard Mall in 2019
- Location: Paradise, Nevada
- Address: 3528 South Maryland Parkway; Las Vegas, Nevada
- Opened: March 6, 1968; 58 years ago
- Developer: Haas and Haynie Investment Corporation
- Owner: Boulevard Ventures LLC; 2495 Riviera LP
- Architect: Robert R. Weber and Associates
- Num. of stores: 124 (as of 1997) ≈80 (as of 2024)
- Num. of anchor tenants: 4
- Floor area: 1,180,000 sq ft (110,000 m^{2})
- Floors: 1
- Parking: ~6,000
- Website: boulevardmall.com

The Boulevard Mall is a single-story super-regional shopping mall in Paradise, Nevada, (Note: An unincorporated town in the Las Vegas Valley with a Las Vegas address.) United States. Located on 75 acres (30 ha), the mall has 1,180,000 sq ft (110,000 m^{2}) of leasable retail space, with approximately 80 tenants as of 2024. Anchor tenants include Goodwill, John's Incredible Pizza Company, Marshalls, and One World Interactive Aquarium (formerly part of the SeaQuest chain). The mall also includes the El Mercado marketplace and a Galaxy Theatres movie theater. It is the oldest shopping mall in the Las Vegas Valley.

Initially announced as the Parkway Mall in September 1963, it opened as The Boulevard Mall on March 6, 1968. It contained 26 stores and four department stores upon opening. It became one of the top shopping spots in the Las Vegas Valley, and was popular among tourists because of its close proximity to the Las Vegas Strip. Customer attendance decreased after the opening of the nearby Fashion Show Mall in 1981. The Boulevard Mall was renovated in 1984. An expansion and further renovations began in 1990 and were completed in 1992, at a cost of $60 million. It was the largest mall in Las Vegas until 2002.

Beginning in 2008, the mall was affected by a decrease in customer attendance due to the Great Recession. By early 2012, it experienced increased customer visitations after introducing several Hispanic community organizations as tenants, in response to the growing nearby Hispanic community. Sansone Companies purchased the mall in November 2013, at a cost of $54.5 million, and then launched a $25 million overhaul which included several unique tenants not usually associated with malls. Macy's and JCPenney closed in 2017, followed by Sears in 2019. Several new tenants have since occupied the vacant anchor spaces, for uses such as call centers and schools.

== History ==
Announced in September 1963, the mall would be built on 62 acres (25 ha) at the southeast corner of Maryland Parkway and Desert Inn Road. The project, originally known as the Parkway Mall, was proposed by the Las Vegas-based Parkway Investment Company, a subsidiary of Paradise Homes. Individuals involved in the project included partners Harry Lahr, Irwin Molasky, and Merv Adelson. In January 1965, Haas and Haynie Corporation took over as owner and developer of the mall project.

The mall, resembling a European village, was designed by Texas-based Robert R. Weber and Associates. Its signature entrance was done by John Graham Jr., who had also designed the Space Needle tower in Seattle, Washington. There would be several department stores, including Sears at the mall's north end, and The Broadway at its south end. The Broadway's three-story building was designed by the Los Angeles-based Charles Luckman and Associates. Both stores began operations ahead of the mall's opening.

Groundbreaking for the Sears store took place on June 30, 1964. Construction of the overall mall and the Broadway began the following year. Work on a JCPenney department store began in June 1966, after a year and a half of design work. The overall mall cost $12.5 million to construct.

On April 29, 1966, a time capsule was buried at the entrance of the then-upcoming Broadway store, with plans to open it 100 years later. Nevada governor Grant Sawyer and lieutenant governor Paul Laxalt attended the time capsule ceremony along with city and county officials. KLAS-TV, a local news channel, was also present to film the event. Items placed in the capsule included the Nevada state flag, copies of the Las Vegas Sun and Las Vegas Review-Journal, and KLAS' film coverage of the ceremony.

=== Opening and owner changes (1968–2013) ===
Sears opened on November 17, 1965, with the mall project known by that point as the Boulevard Shopping Center. The Broadway store opened on October 17, 1966.

The Boulevard Mall itself opened at 10:00 a.m. on March 6, 1968, with a ribbon-cutting ceremony attended by Nevada governor Paul Laxalt and Nevada state senator Floyd Lamb. It measured 750,000 sq ft (70,000 m^{2}), and was the second indoor mall in Las Vegas; the smaller Charleston Plaza, with approximately 300,000 sq ft (28,000 m^{2}), had opened several years earlier and operated until 1988.

The Boulevard Mall was popular among tourists because of its close proximity to the Las Vegas Strip, located approximately a mile and a half west. It became one of the top shopping spots in the Las Vegas Valley, resulting in Maryland Parkway becoming a popular retail corridor. The mall was financially successful during the 1970s, but experienced a loss in customers after the 1981 opening of the nearby Fashion Show Mall on the Las Vegas Strip. The mall would further be affected by other retail centers on the Strip, as well as the Galleria at Sunset mall in nearby Henderson, Nevada.

In its early years, the Boulevard Mall changed ownership several times. In December 1969, it was sold to Chrysler Realty Corporation, based in Detroit. Balcor Realty Investors, based in Chicago, purchased it in 1974, for $21 million. The mall was sold again in 1978, for $31.5 million. The new owners were MEPC American Properties Inc. (a subsidiary of the British MEPC) and Schroder Real Estate. MEPC later became the sole owner.

The Boulevard Mall was remodeled in 1984. A major expansion and renovation began in October 1990, and was completed in August 1992, at a cost of $60 million. The expansion added approximately 150,000 sq ft (14,000 m^{2}) of retail space, as well as a 24,000 sq ft (2,200 m^{2}) food court, and three multi-tiered parking decks. A 140-camera surveillance system was also installed throughout the mall, while horseback and bicycle patrols were added in the parking lot.

By April 1998, the mall encompassed 1,250,000 sq ft (116,000 m^{2}). General Growth Properties (GGP) purchased it from MEPC that month. It was the largest mall in Las Vegas until a 2002 expansion of the Fashion Show Mall. In May 2004, renovation plans were announced for the mall. Among the planned changes was the addition of a pedestrian shopping and restaurant streetscape. Interior changes would include a children's play area, new landscaping, new seating, new tile flooring, a remodeled food court, refurbished bathrooms, and the addition of a family bathroom. Two new entrances were also planned: one on the mall's west side, near a parking garage, and another on the mall's east side, near Dillard's. The mall was scheduled to remain open during the renovations, with construction expected to begin in summer 2004 for completion in fall 2005.

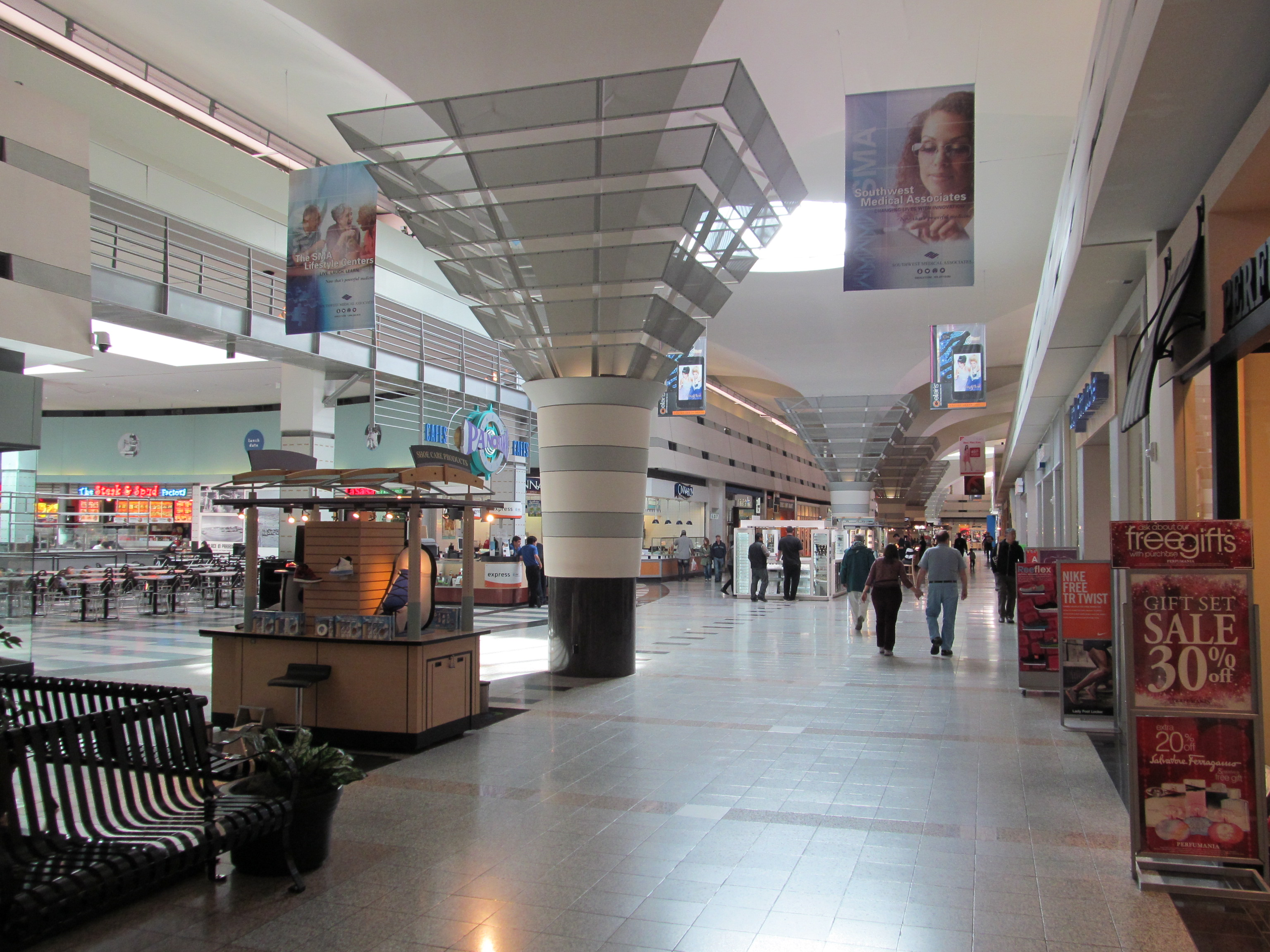
Interior of the mall in 2012

The mall suffered from the effects of the Great Recession, with various store closings beginning in 2008. By 2011, the five-mile radius surrounding the mall had a Hispanic population of 45 percent, as well as a sizeable Filipino population; both groups became the mall's target clientele. Rouse Properties, a corporate spin-off of GGP formed in August 2011, took over ownership and operations of the mall in January 2012. Rouse Properties continued the strategy of appealing to the Hispanic and Filipino population.

As of late 2012, the mall was 89-percent leased out, although only 73 percent of the mall was occupied by tenants, as several had closed due to poor economic conditions. The Boulevard Mall had the second lowest occupancy rate of Rouse Properties' 32 malls, located across 20 states. The mall also had $168 million in debt from a loan, prompting Rouse Properties to surrender the mall to foreclosure in June 2013. The mall was acquired by Midland Loan Services, related to PNC Bank. The mall was valued at $61.2 million, and contained 1,180,000 sq ft (110,000 m^{2}). In July 2013, the lenders put the mall up for sale, with "best offer" as the listed price.

=== Sansone ownership (2013–present) ===
On November 21, 2013, the mall was sold for $54.5 million to Sansone Companies, a long-time Las Vegas real estate firm owned by local developer Roland Sansone. The sale was announced 11 days later. Sansone purchased 56 of the mall's 75 acres; the remainder was owned by the Macy's and Sears stores. The newly formed Sansone Companies/Boulevard Ventures LLC planned to keep current tenants and add new ones. Boulevard Ventures LLC owns 56.15 percent of the mall, while 2495 Riviera LP has 43.85 percent ownership.

The Boulevard Mall is the oldest shopping mall in the Las Vegas Valley, and was considered to be dated and run down at the time of purchase. Sansone planned a renovation which included building repairs and the addition of drought-tolerant landscaping. The mall's gray colors would also be replaced with new paint, and Wi-Fi would be added in the food court. The mall remained open during the renovations, which began in December 2014, with a planned cost of $25 million. Extensive work to the exterior was underway in April 2015, resulting in an Art Deco façade. Security was also improved, leading to a decrease in crime.

Sansone's target clientele was middle-class Hispanics. Speaking of the mall's evolution, general manager Timo Kuusela said in 2015, "Ten years ago, it was basically just packed with people all the time, and we had a lot more national tenants. It made money with no effort. Today, we really have to work to meet the needs of the demographic we serve." As part of his revitalization efforts, Sansone planned to add unique tenants not typically associated with malls. Within three years of his purchase, tenant occupancy increased from 75 to 95 percent.

In May 2018, a masked man entered the mall with a rifle, prompting an evacuation of the property. The man was apprehended by police, who believed the gun to be fake.

== Tenants ==
The Boulevard Mall opened with 26 stores. It featured four department stores: The Broadway, JCPenney, Sears, and Ronzone's. At the time, Ronzone's was the largest family-owned merchandise retailer in Nevada, with more than 40,000 sq ft (3,700 m^{2}). Ronzone's was later acquired by Diamond's, and the store was rebranded under this name in 1974. Dillard's eventually acquired the Diamond's chain, and rebranded the Boulevard Mall store under its own name in 1986. Five years later, Dillard's opened a new store at the mall, containing 208,000 sq ft (19,300 m^{2}) across two floors. It made up the mall's new south end. The Broadway became a Macy's in 1996.

Marshalls was added as an anchor tenant in 1983. It occupies a separate building, south of the mall, that previously operated as a supermarket. In 1989, the Boulevard Mall had 85 tenants, including anchor stores. F. W. Woolworth, a major tenant since the mall's opening, would close its remaining stores in 1997. The Boulevard Mall location contained 51,170 sq ft (4,754 m^{2}) and a restaurant.

By the end of 1997, the mall included a 13-vendor food court and three restaurants, as well as 124 stores and five anchor stores: Dillard's, JCPenney, Macy's, Marshalls, and Sears. Clown 'N Around, an attraction consisting of carnival games and small rides, opened at the Boulevard Mall in the mid-2000s and operated for nearly 10 years.

Dillard's store closed in October 2008, due to the effects of the Great Recession. The closure had a negative impact on several nearby tenants, which eventually closed themselves due to decreased foot traffic in that portion of the mall. GGP purchased the Dillard's store in 2011, for $5 million.

=== Hispanic and Filipino appeal ===
By 2011, the mall had seen a resurgence among Hispanic people who lived nearby. The Mexican Patriotic Committee, offering afterschool and parental programs as well as seminars, began operating at the mall in October 2011, in a space that had been vacant for five years. The Hispanic Museum of Nevada opened at the mall in early 2012. The Mexico Vivo Dance Studio and Cultural Arts Center also opened in the mall around the same time, in a 6,380 sq ft (593 m^{2}) space. Stores at the mall were also now offering Mexican-style candy, piñatas, and quinceañera dresses. According to Ric Jimenez, the mall's general manager at the time:

There has been a demographic shift that is very typical of a lot of Southwestern cities. It was once a cosmopolitan, upper-middle-class area in the '60s and '70s when the mall was built. Because of urban sprawl, people started leaving the core of the city for bedroom communities like Green Valley and Summerlin. There was an ethnic shift, and socioeconomically, we are a lot different now.

The addition of Hispanic organizations resulted in an increase of customer attendance at the mall. As of 2012, several Hispanic community organizations were in discussions to start operating inside the mall, whose management planned to lessen its focus on department stores and improve customer attendance by adding community organizations in the mall's vacant store space. Discussions were also underway for non-Hispanic community organizations to open at the mall. Up to that time, the mall had become a popular site for Hispanic events, which included hosting Fiestas Patrias, and a Cinco de Mayo festival, as well as the 2011 season of the reality television series La Academia. The mall became a common gathering place as a community center for the nearby Hispanic and Filipino population.

In 2013, the mall was the location of two large Filipino-related events, celebrating Pinoy pride and the Filipino Independence Day. That year, KMCC, an affiliate television channel of the Spanish MundoFox network, relocated to a 4,722 sq ft (438.7 m^{2}) space inside the mall's east court that included administrative offices and a control room. The channel was broadcast to mall shoppers through large television monitors.

In 2016, up to 80 percent of the mall's clientele was Hispanic. El Mercado, a Hispanic-themed marketplace and food court, was completed in October 2021. Located inside the mall, El Mercado includes nearly 190 tenants of its own. A Spanish radio station, 98.1, began operating from a new studio at El Mercado in 2022.

=== Changes under Sansone ===
Sansone sought to add unique tenants not typically found at malls. As of 2024, the Boulevard Mall has approximately 80 tenants, excluding those at El Mercado.

==== Anchor spaces ====
Sansone's revitalization efforts focused heavily on the anchor spaces. An Asian grocery store chain, 99 Ranch Market, opened at the mall in 2015. It operated for 10 years, occupying a 33,000 sq ft (3,100 m^{2}) space formerly used as a Circuit City.

At a cost of more than $2 million, the old Dillard's store was gutted and prepared for several possible tenants before they were decided. A 28,000 sq ft (2,600 m^{2}) Goodwill thrift store opened in October 2015, occupying part of the ground floor. It was the first Goodwill store to open inside an enclosed shopping mall, and served as a new anchor for the Boulevard Mall. Another new anchor, a 60,000 sq ft (5,600 m^{2}) John's Incredible Pizza Company restaurant opened two months later, taking up the remainder of the ground floor. The restaurant immediately became the chain's most profitable location. A 50,000 sq ft (4,600 m^{2}) TeleTech call center took over part of the second floor in 2017.

In 2017, Sears sold its store to a Sansone-affiliated investor group, which leased the space back to Sears to keep the store operational. The sale allowed for plans to develop the large parking lot surrounding the store, with various possibilities having been discussed, including a hotel. Sears closed its store in March 2019, as part of a plan to close numerous stores nationwide. Plans were soon announced to redevelop the building and parking lot as a new retail project, The Boulevard Plaza, although construction never began. Instead, the Sears building opened as a UEI College campus in 2020. Public Storage also opened in a section of the former Sears.

Macy's closed its store in 2017, and the 178,000 sq ft (16,500 m^{2}) building was sold for approximately $3.5 million to a company associated with the Troesh family, who partnered with Roland Sansone on his purchase of the mall. In 2018, Anthem Blue Cross Blue Shield opened an office in the building. Barton Associates, a Massachusetts staffing firm, also became a tenant. A charter school, the Western Youth Leadership, Engagement, and Empowerment Middle School (WYLEES), opened in 2025, in the remaining available space of the Macy's building. The school sought a starting capacity of 160 students, with space for more.

JCPenney closed in 2017. A Canadian-based call center, 24-7 Intouch, took over part of the building in 2018. Another portion was leased to Headz Up, a 41,000 sq ft (3,800 m^{2}) entertainment complex, also opened in 2018. It included a room of three-dimensional murals, a virtual reality attraction, escape rooms, and indoor archery tag played with rubber arrows. In 2019, Headz Up added the Nevada Boxing Hall of Fame to its space, including boxing memorabilia and a boxing ring. El Mercado has since taken over the former JCPenney space.

==== Other additions ====
In March 2016, Sansone Companies announced plans to add a 31,000 sq ft (2,900 m^{2}) SeaQuest Interactive Aquarium inside the mall. SeaQuest opened on December 11, 2016, serving as a new anchor tenant. It occupies space previously held by nine individual stores. The SeaQuest chain went bankrupt in 2024 and its Boulevard Mall location was purchased the following year by Boulevard Ventures, which renamed it One World Interactive Aquarium.

A dinosaur-themed amusement center, named Rex Center, opened with 40,000 sq ft (3,700 m^{2}) of space on October 27, 2017. The 30,000 sq ft (2,800 m^{2}) complex includes miniature golf, go-karts, and laser tag. It was part of Sansone's continued strategy to add non-traditional tenants in response to retailers' struggle against online shopping alternatives, such as Amazon. A shooting occurred at Rex Center in 2018, during an early-morning party, while the rest of the mall had been closed for the night. Four people were injured.

In March 2017, plans were announced for Galaxy Theatres to open a movie theater at the Boulevard Mall under a 35-year lease. The theater would be built in tenant space located across from SeaQuest, which would require relocating some stores. It was intended to be opened around December 2017, in time for the theatrical release of Star Wars: The Last Jedi. The theater, known as Galaxy Theatres Luxury Boulevard, eventually opened in April 2019. It is the third Galaxy Theatres location in the Las Vegas Valley, and features the first Sony Digital Cinema, a large-format theatrical system by Sony.
