= Fashion Show Las Vegas =

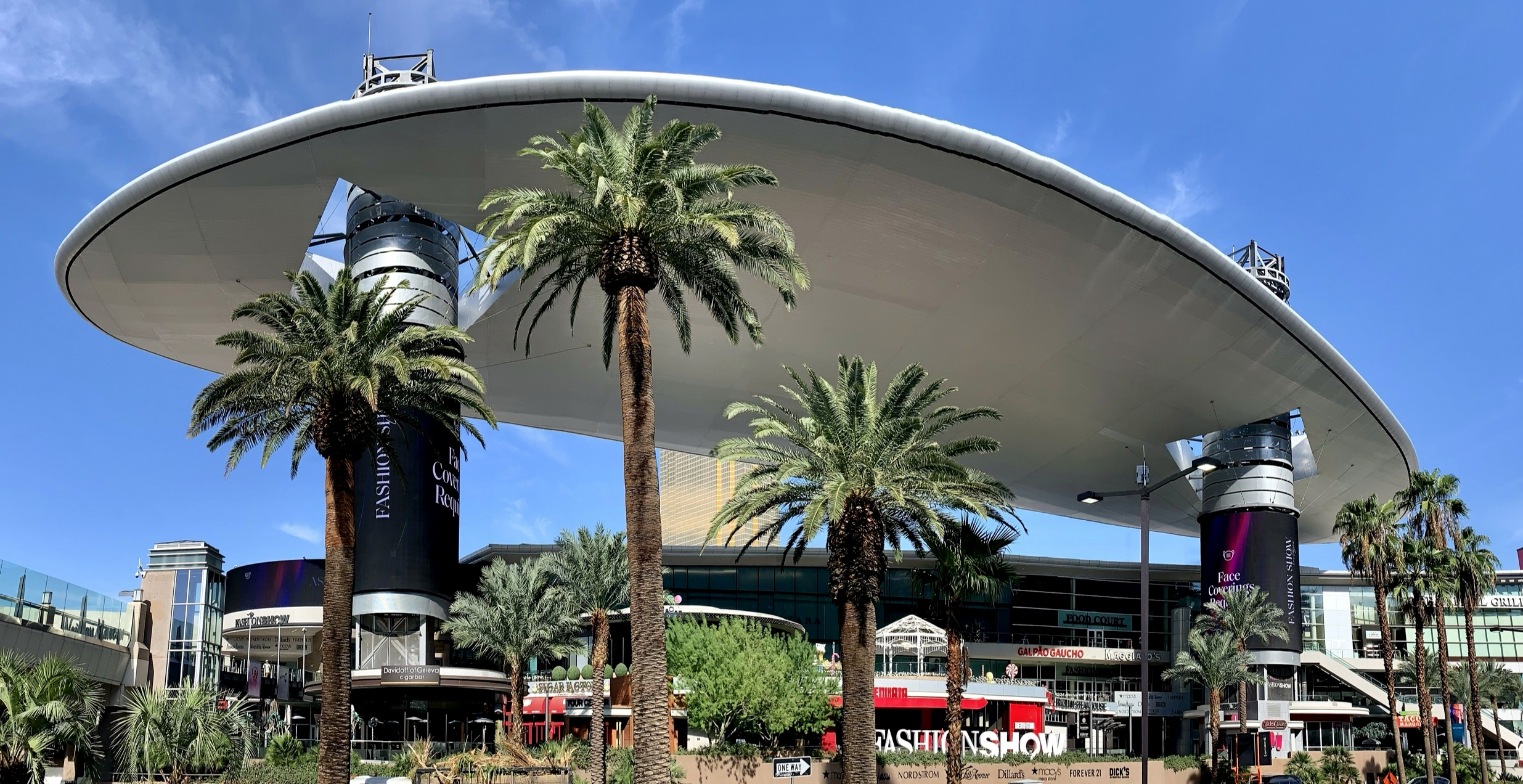
- Fashion Show Las Vegas and the Cloud, seen from the Strip in October 2021
- Location: Paradise, Nevada, U.S.
- Coordinates: 36°7′38″N 115°10′19″W
- Address: 3200 South Las Vegas Boulevard
- Opened: February 14, 1981; 45 years ago (original); 2003; 23 years ago (2000s renovation)
- Renovated: 2000–2003
- Previous names: Fashion Show Mall (1981–2003)
- Developer: Summa Corporation; The Hahn Company
- Manager: GGP
- Owner: GGP
- Num. of stores: 249
- Num. of anchor tenants: 8
- Floor area: 1,878,186 sq ft (174,489.2 m^{2})
- Floors: 2 with partial third floor (3 in Nordstrom)
- Website: www.fslv.com
- Building details
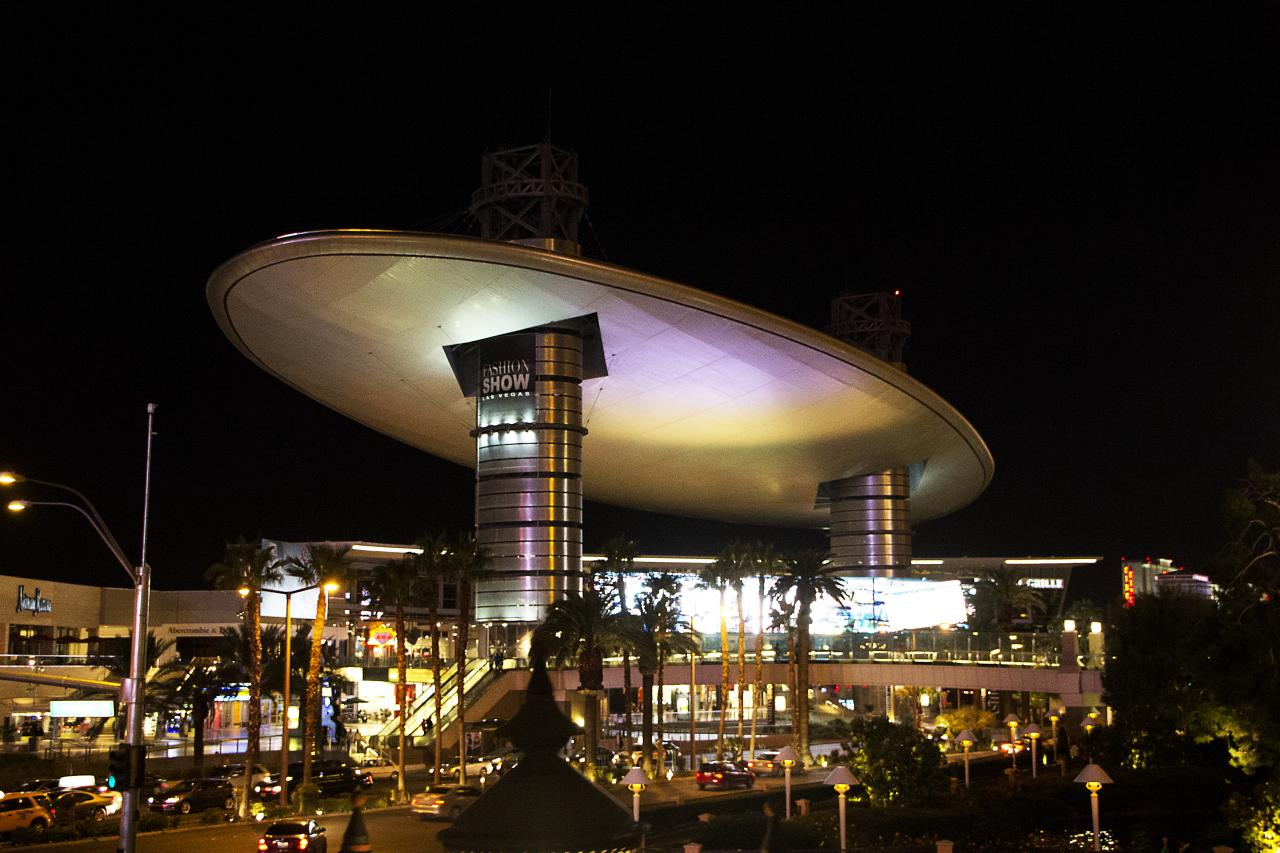
- The Cloud at night

Design and construction
- Main contractor: The Hahn Company

Renovating team
- Renovating firm: The Rouse Company

Fashion Show Las Vegas, formerly the Fashion Show Mall, is a shopping mall located on the Las Vegas Strip in Paradise, Nevada. It was developed by Summa Corporation and Ernest W. Hahn, the latter also serving as general contractor.

Construction began on March 15, 1979, and the project was built at a cost of $74 million. Fashion Show Mall opened on February 14, 1981, becoming the first major shopping center on the Strip. It was also the third mall to open in the Las Vegas Valley. Its success prompted the construction of other retail centers on the Strip, including the Forum Shops.

The Rouse Company took over ownership in the 1990s and later conducted a $1 billion renovation and expansion, which lasted from 2000 to 2003. The project included new stores and restaurants, as well as a retractable runway for fashion shows. A plaza along the Strip was also added and includes the Cloud, a steel structure providing shade to pedestrians, while doubling as a nighttime projection surface for advertising. General Growth Properties acquired Rouse in 2004. General Growth Properties became a subsidiary of Brookfield Properties in 2018, and the company was rebranded back to the GGP name in January 2026.

== History ==
Summa Corporation announced Fashion Show Mall in July 1978, to be built on 34 acres (14 ha) on the Las Vegas Strip, south of Summa's Frontier hotel-casino. It would be co-developed with Ernest W. Hahn, which would also serve as general contractor. It was designed by ArchiSystems, based in Van Nuys, California. The project had been planned for years. The Frontier's Little Church of the West occupied a portion of the future mall site, and was relocated elsewhere on the Strip. Groundbreaking took place on March 15, 1979.

Built at a cost of $74 million, Fashion Show Mall opened on February 14, 1981. It was the first major shopping center to open on the Strip, and the third to open in the Las Vegas Valley. Tourists were the primary demographic. The mall was 75-percent owned by Summa, while Hahn held the remaining ownership. The mall was successful, prompting the addition of other retail centers on the Strip, including the Forum Shops. A $10 million renovation was completed in 1993, after three years of planning and construction.

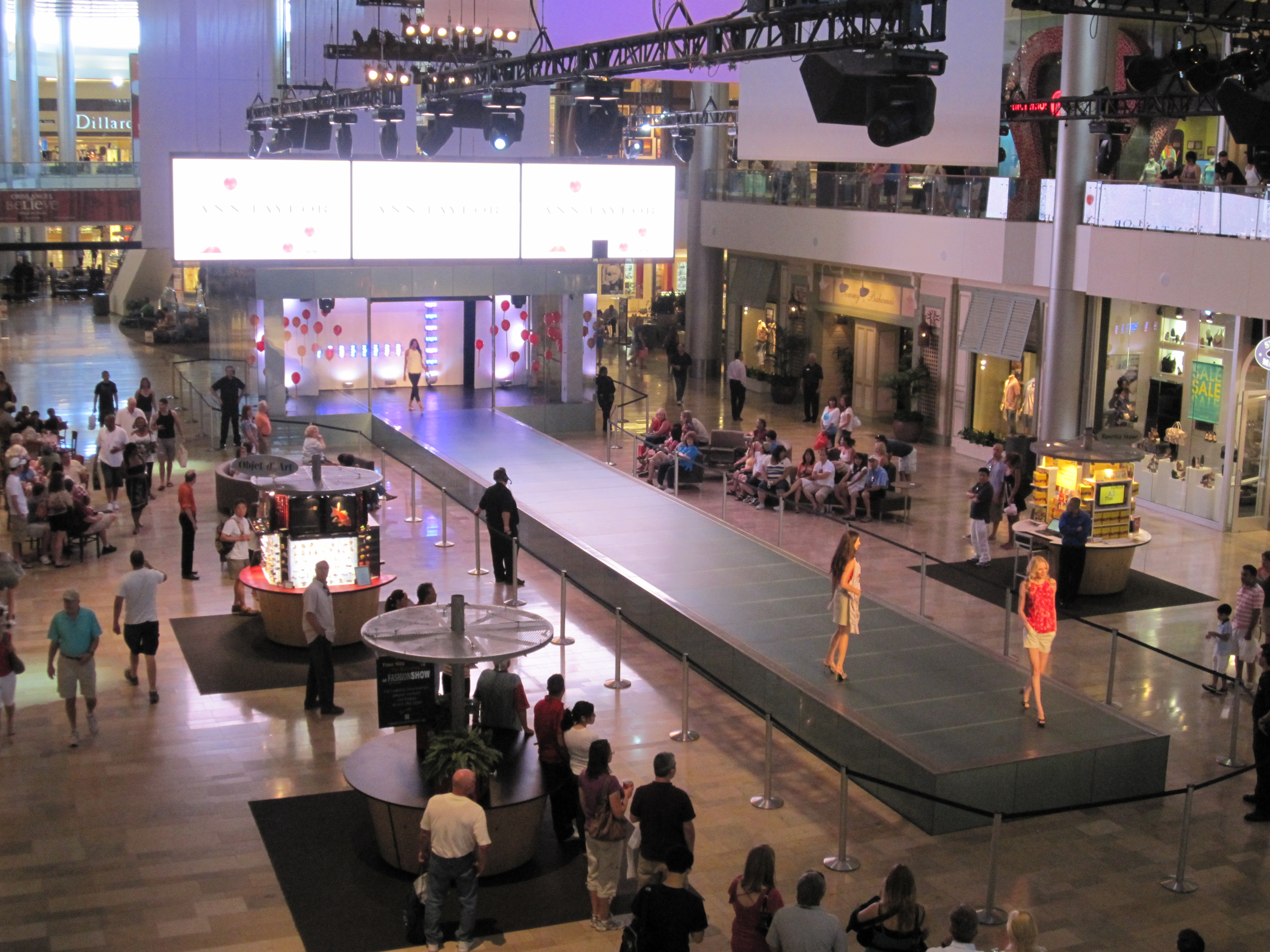
A runway fashion show in 2010

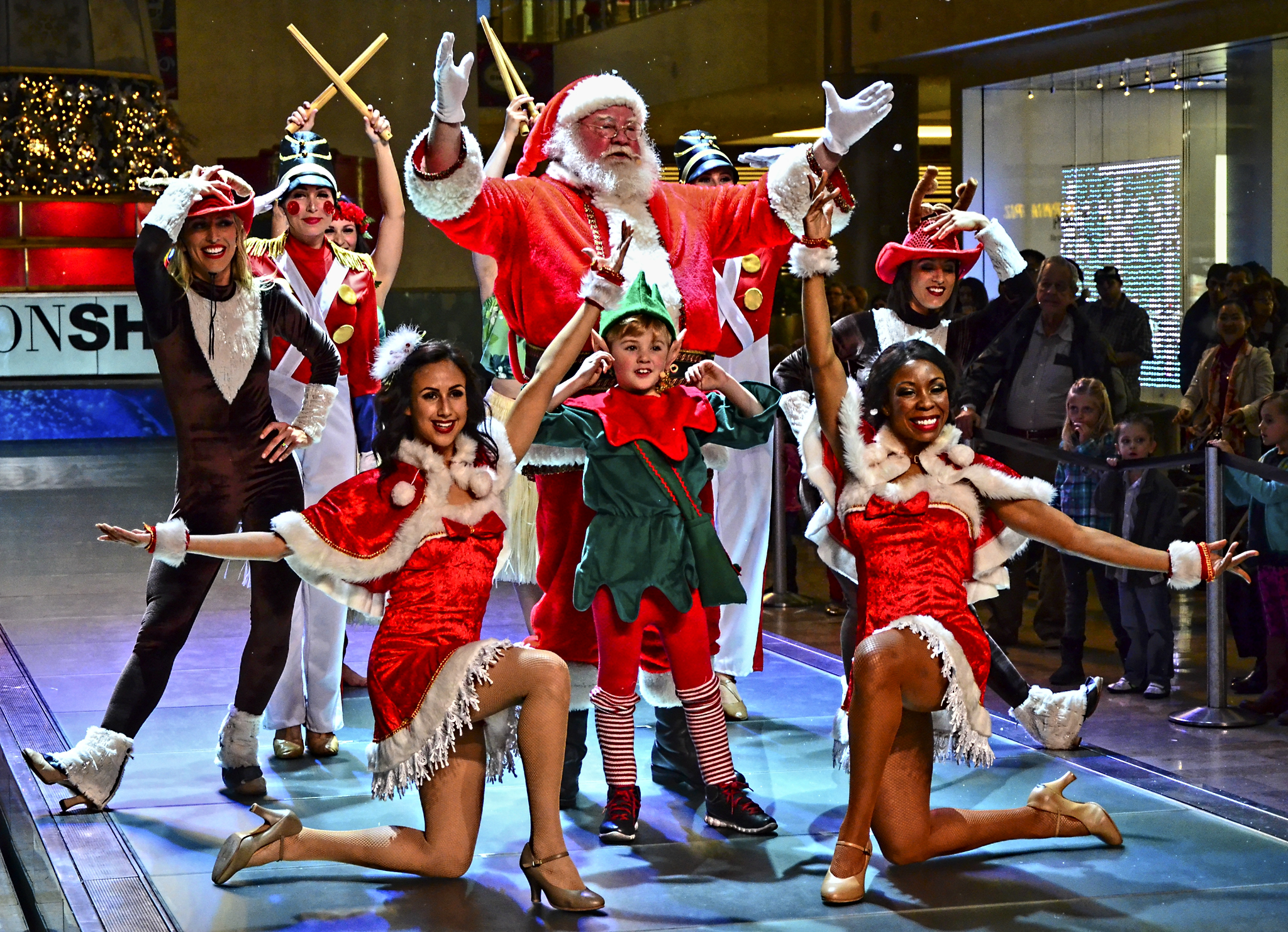
Christmas runway show, 2013

Summa later became the Howard Hughes Corporation, and was sold to The Rouse Company in 1996. A year later, Rouse announced plans to expand Fashion Show Mall, while new management began hosting events there to attract additional patrons. In 1998, Rouse purchased 15 acres of property just west of the mall, previously used by Mirage Resorts as an employee parking lot. Rouse bought out Hahn's ownership stake a month later.

In May 2000, work began on an expansion and remodel, a project that tenants felt was overdue. A new west wing, the first phase of the $1 billion expansion project, opened on November 1, 2002. It introduced a retractable runway and stage used for fashion shows. The space has also been used to put on Christmas shows.

The existing east wing debuted on October 1, 2003, following renovations. The expansion and renovation helped the mall compete against newer retail centers on the Strip, such as the Forum Shops and the Grand Canal Shoppes, both of which were also in the process of expansion. General Growth Properties (now Brookfield Properties) acquired the mall in 2004, when it purchased Rouse.

Various incidents have occurred at the mall, including an unsuccessful bomb threat in 1983, and a jewelry store heist in 1999. Several shootings have occurred, including one at the food court in 2014. Another shooting in 2019 prompted the evacuation of the mall. In 2022, a woman was shot and killed in the mall's parking garage during an attempted robbery.

In 2014, the mall was used to film the interior shots of the fictitious West Orange Pavilion Mall for the opening sequence of Paul Blart: Mall Cop 2.

On March 6, 2026, Saks Global announced the closure of 12 Saks Fifth Avenue and 3 Neiman Marcus locations nationwide in an effort to further cut costs and focus on more profitable locations, including the Saks store at Fashion Show Las Vegas.

== Features ==
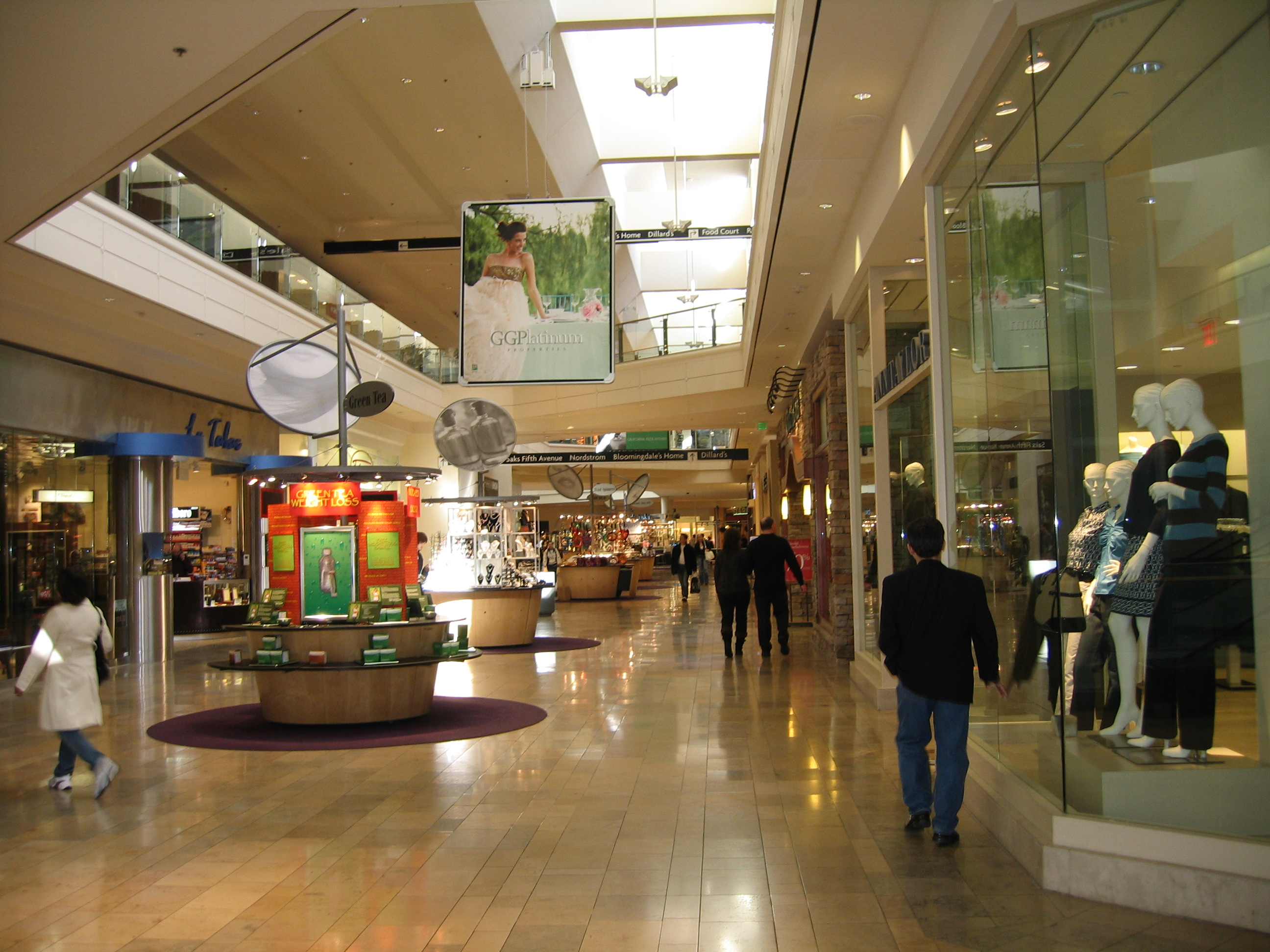
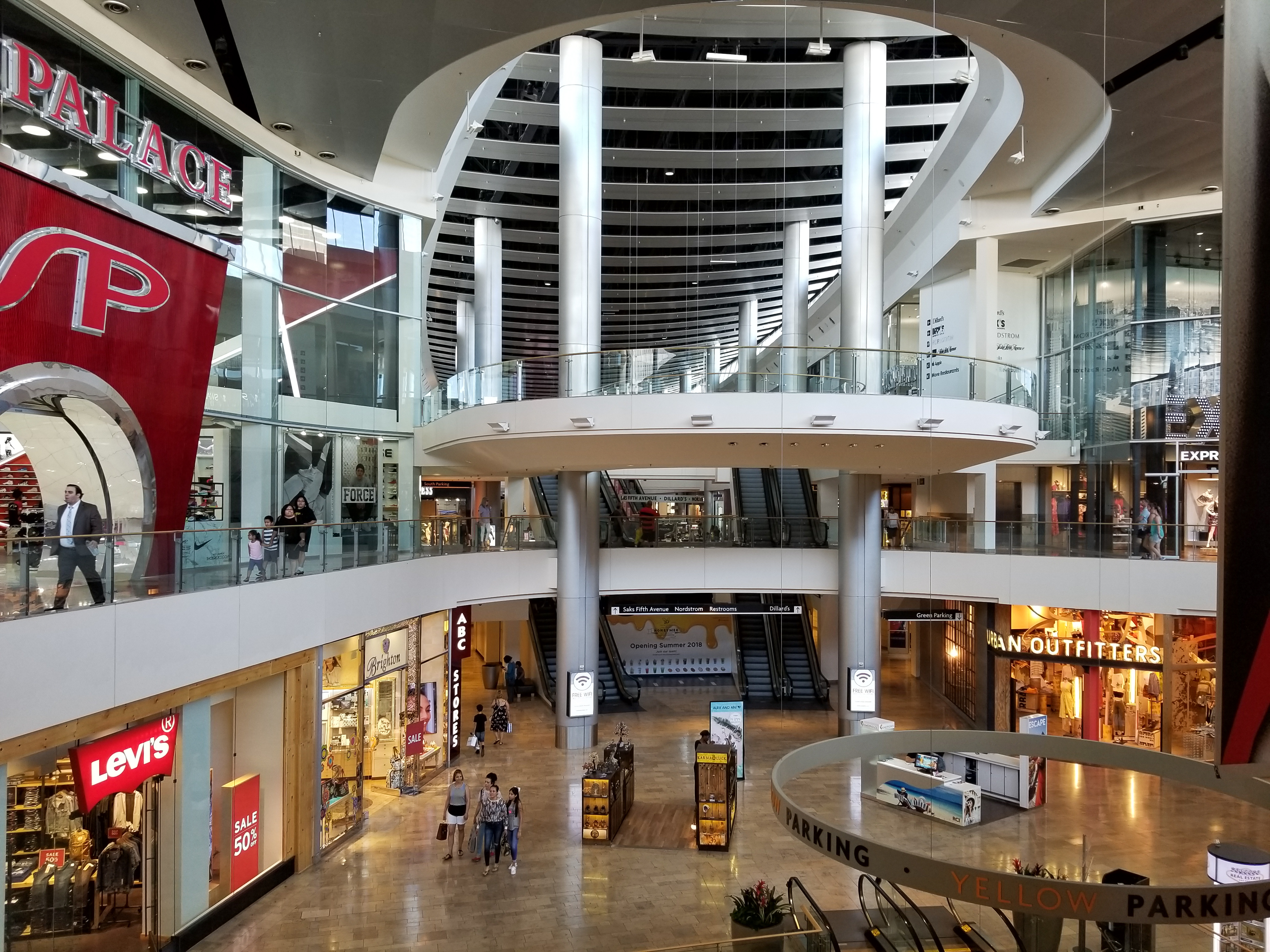
Different areas of the mall interior in 2008 (top) and 2018

=== Stores ===
Fashion Show Mall opened with 822,700 sq ft (76,430 m^{2}). Anchor tenants occupied 500,000 sq ft (46,000 m^{2}), and included Bullock's, Diamond's, Goldwater's, Neiman-Marcus, and Saks Fifth Avenue. The latter two introduced luxury designer brands to Las Vegas. Aside from anchors, the mall had 130 tenant spaces, and opened with 87 stores. Diamond's was converted to a Dillard's store in 1984. The first Bullock's Woman store opened at Fashion Show Mall in 1987. Goldwater's became a May Company store in 1989 and then a Robinsons-May in 1993, while Bullock's was converted to a Macy's in 1996.

The expansion in the early 2000s doubled the mall's size to approximately 1,900,000 sq ft (180,000 m^{2}). This made it one of the largest malls in the U.S., while surpassing The Boulevard Mall as the largest in Las Vegas. Notable new tenants in the expansion included Abercrombie & Fitch, Ann Taylor Loft, Claire's, Guess, Louis Vuitton, and the first Apple Store in Las Vegas. Other tenants added since then have included Banana Republic, Henri Bendel, Disney Store, and Pop Mart.

Mall profits had been held back by the limited size of its anchor stores, which were enlarged during the expansion. Dillard's relocated to a 200,000 sq ft (19,000 m^{2}) space in the new west wing. Saks Fifth Avenue occupied a new 170,000 sq ft (16,000 m^{2}) addition, marking its largest location outside of New York. The expansion project also added two new anchor tenants for a total of seven, more than any other mall in the U.S., surpassing the five-anchor Mall of America. The new anchors included Nordstrom, making its Las Vegas debut; and the first Bloomingdale's Home location. An eighth anchor, Lord & Taylor, was scheduled to take the former Dillard's space. However, parent company May Department Stores dropped these plans, citing poor economic conditions. The vacant space was eventually taken over by Forever 21, which opened in 2010. Robinsons-May eventually closed, and was replaced in 2013 by a Macy's Men store. Bloomingdale's store closed that year, and was replaced two years later by Dick's Sporting Goods.

As of 2014, the mall had 250 stores. In 2025, all Forever 21 stores, including the Fashion Show Mall location, closed due to liquidation.

=== Plaza and Cloud ===
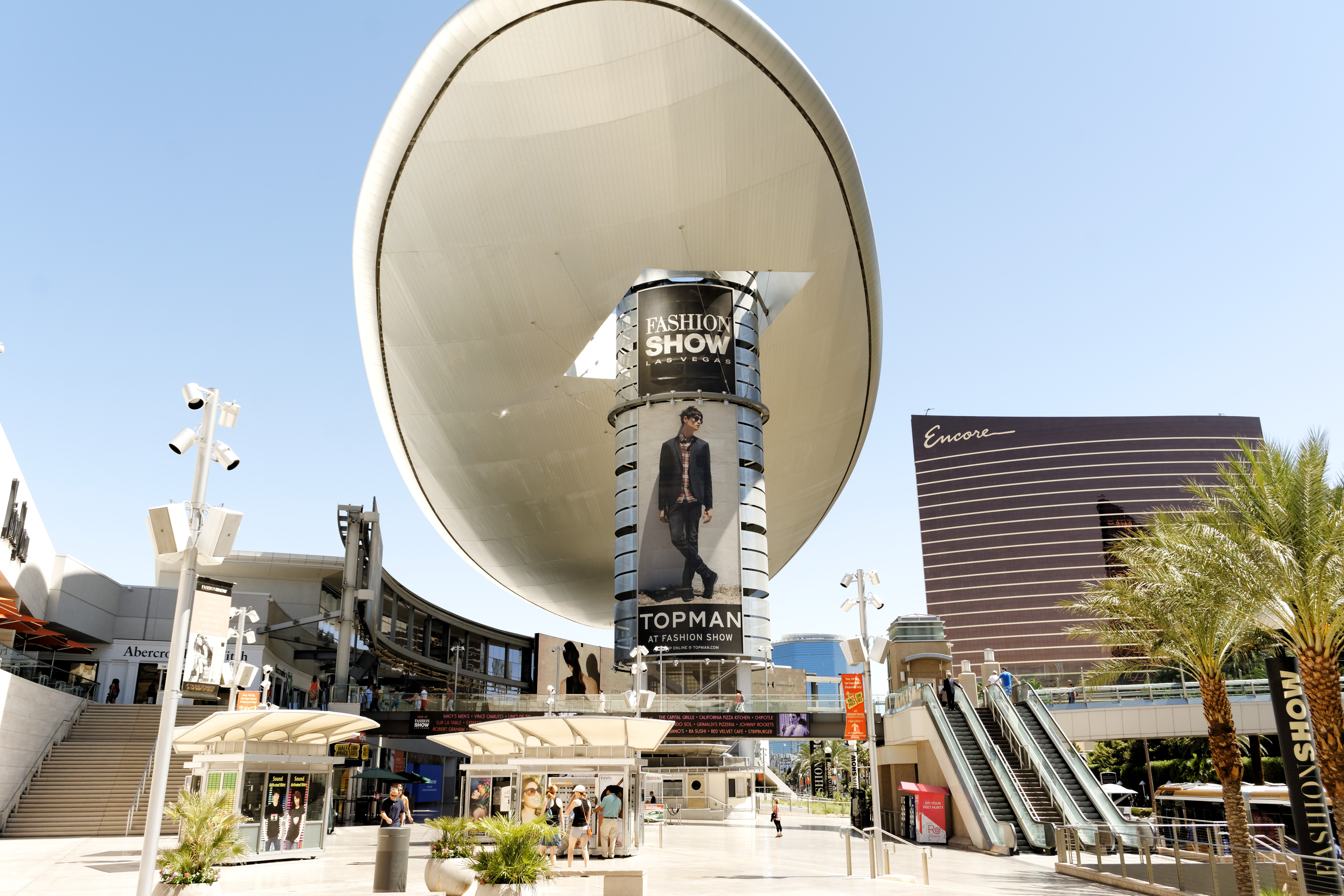
Cloud and plaza area, 2014

A plaza, measuring 72,000 sq ft (6,700 m^{2}), opened at the east entrance in 2003, as part of the expansion. The project also added the Cloud, an oval-shaped structure located above the plaza. It provides shade during the day, while its underside serves as a nighttime projection screen for paid advertisers.

Construction of the Cloud took more than a year. The structure weighs 1.1 million pounds, and is 479 feet long and 160 feet wide. Situated at an angle, its lowest and highest point above the ground is 96 and 128 feet respectively. The Cloud is stationed in place with the use of cables, preventing strong winds from blowing it away. The structure is mostly made of steel, which was prefabricated and assembled on-site before being lifted into place. Construction took place along Las Vegas Boulevard, and the safety of nearby traffic posed the biggest construction challenge. The plaza was revamped in 2015 to include new LED screens.

=== Restaurants ===
Approximately 46,000 sq ft (4,300 m^{2}) of restaurant space was added in the early 1990s. Dive!, a sea-themed restaurant, opened in 1996. It was a joint venture between film director Steven Spielberg and businessmen Steve Wynn and Jeffrey Katzenberg. Dive! was demolished in 2001, making way for the plaza area.

California Pizza Kitchen was among several new restaurants opened in 2002, during the first phase of expansion. Additional restaurants opened in 2004, including The Capital Grille, Maggiano's Little Italy, and RA Sushi. The original food court was removed, and a new one opened in the renovated east wing, measuring 11,288 sq ft (1,048.7 m^{2}). It occupies a third floor overlooking the Strip. As of 2014, the mall had 15 dining establishments. Plans were announced that year to add five more restaurants to the plaza area. In 2018, chef Tom Douglas opened an Italian restaurant Jeannie's, noted as "fresh and full of vegetables" and "a welcome respite from the congested Strip" in the SFGate in 2024. A Hello Kitty-themed cafe opened in 2022. Former football player Emmitt Smith opened a steakhouse, Emmitt's Vegas, in 2024.

== Gallery ==
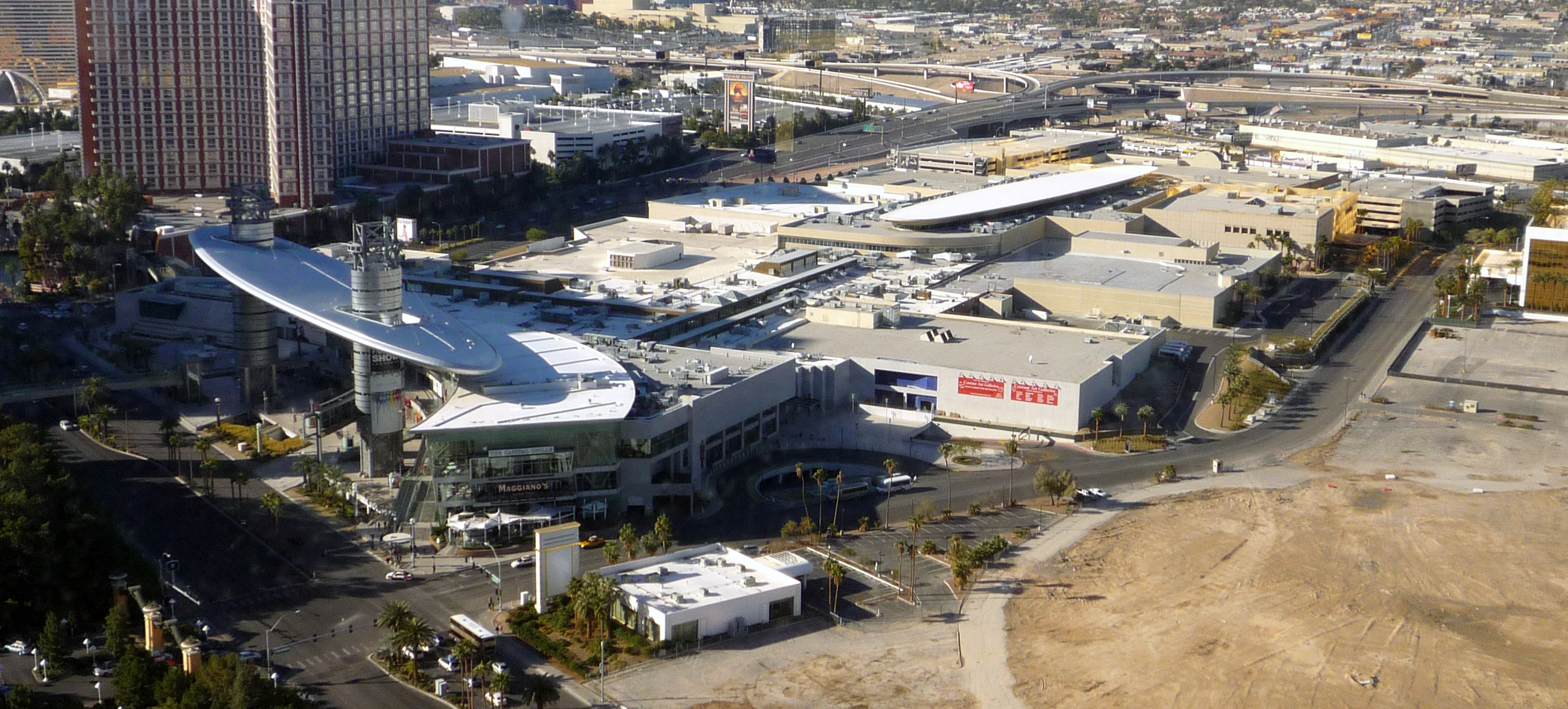
Looking southwest over the mall in 2008

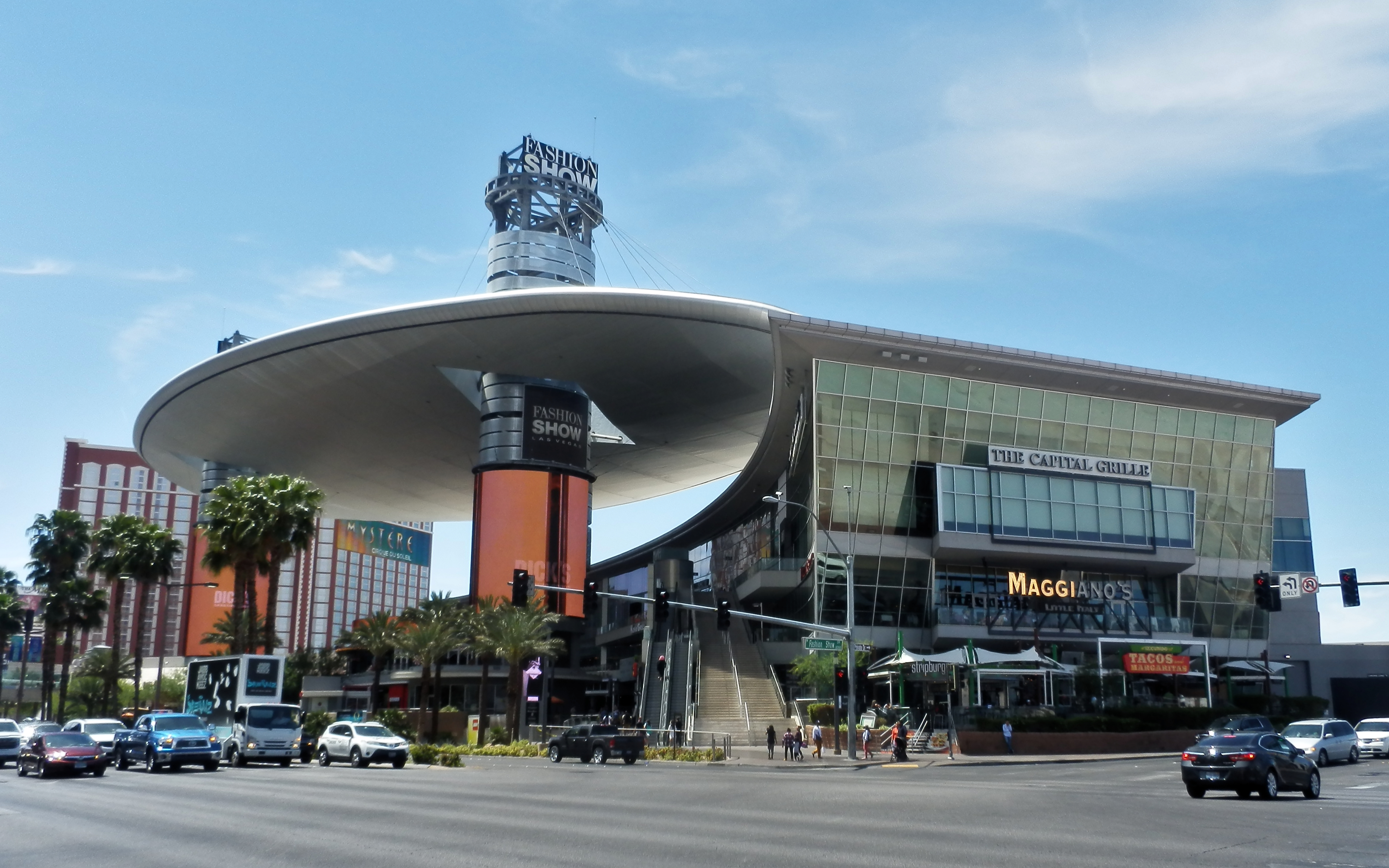
Restaurants at the mall's northeast corner

Christmas decor, 2006
