= Paradise Valley Mall =

Former shopping mall in Phoenix, Arizona

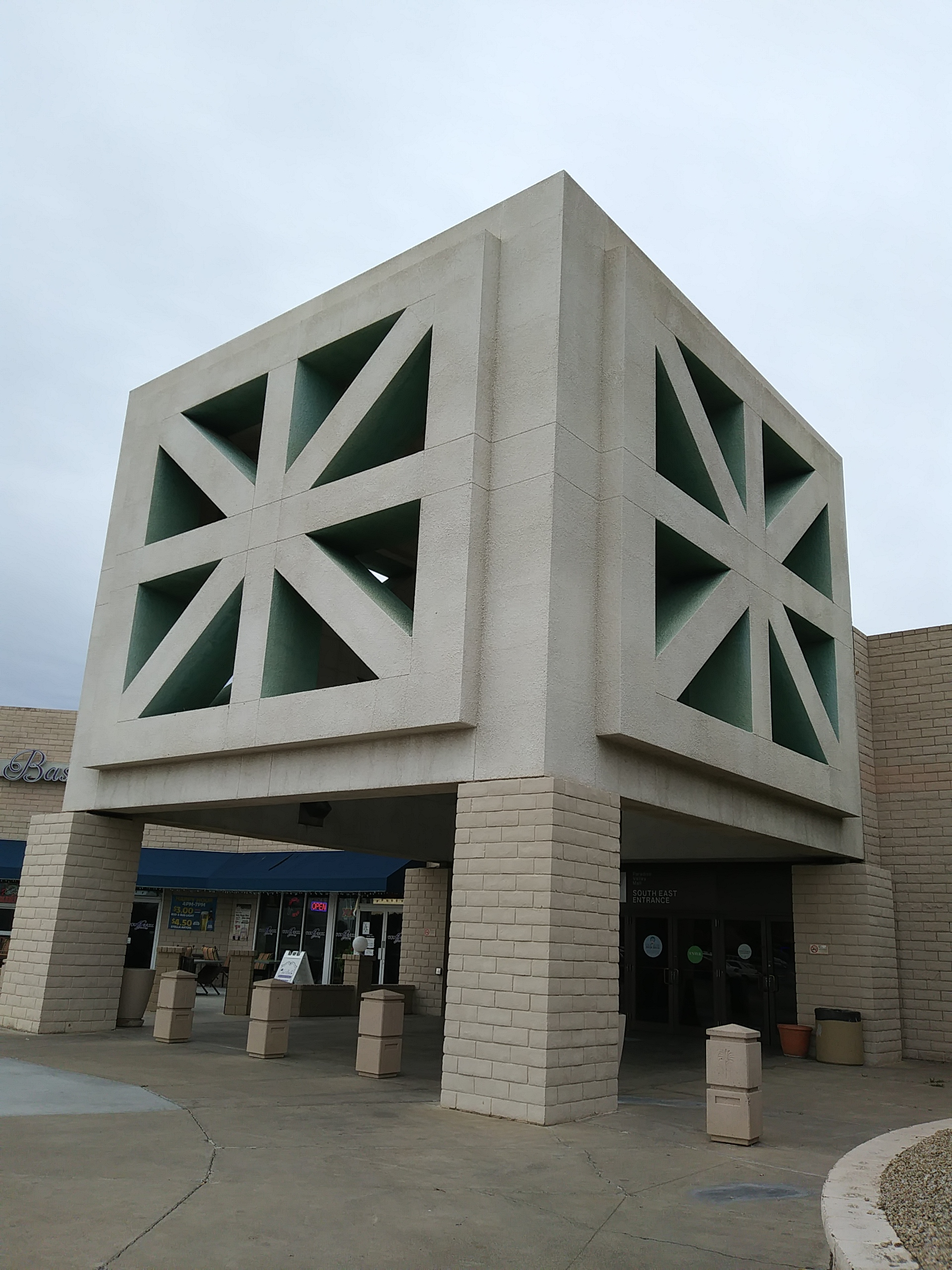
- South East Entrance, February 2021
- Location: Phoenix, AZ
- Coordinates: 33.6004317°N 111.983386°W
- Address: 4568 E Cactus Rd.
- Opened: 1978, grand opening ceremony held February 28, 1979
- Closed: March 31, 2021
- Developer: Westcor and the Dayton-Hudson Corporation
- Manager: RED Development
- Owner: RED Development
- Architect: Rafique Islam of Architectonics Inc.
- Num. of stores: 2
- Num. of anchor tenants: 5 at peak (2 open)
- Floor area: 1,152,333 sq ft (107,055.2 m^{2})
- Floors: 1 (2 in JCPenney, former Dillard's, former Macy's, and former Sears, 3 in the former Broadway.)
- Website: theparadisevalleymall.com

Paradise Valley Mall was a shopping mall located in Phoenix, Arizona, United States. The last remaining anchor stores were JCPenney and Costco. There were 3 vacant anchor stores that were once Sears, Dillard's, and Macy's.

The former owner, Macerich, has rezoned the land for mixed use. Demolition of the indoor mall portion started in July 2021 and ended in February 2022. On April 8, 2021, Macerich sold the mall to Phoenix-based RED Development. The original mall structure was not completely demolished, as a portion of it connected to JCPenney remains and is slated for future retail development with a smaller courtyard-style layout. The Costco is a freestanding building that replaced an existing portion of the mall.

The mall, developed by Westcor, is surrounded by a circular street named Paradise Village Parkway. This street design was inspired by the Metrocenter Parkway circular street around Metrocenter Mall, which was also developed by Westcor in the years prior (1970–1973).

The mall closed on March 31, 2021, Demolition began on July 7, 2021.

== History ==
=== Opening ===
The mall was proposed in May 1977. It opened in 1978; however, the opening ceremony was held on February 28, 1979. The mall opened with three anchor tenants: JCPenney occupying the West anchor space, Goldwater's (later Robinsons-May and then Macy's, then vacant) occupying the center space and Diamond's (later Dillard's, and later Sears, now demolished) occupying the Eastern space. The mall was designed by local architect Rafique Islam of the firm Architectonics Inc. A.V. Schwann & Associates was the structural engineer. The Law Company Inc. of Wichita, Kansas was general contractor. The mall was constructed of Slump Block and white stucco, and featured skylights, landscaped courtyards. The floors of the mall were Parquet and Terrazzo tile in Indian patterns. When built the mall featured several energy efficient features including a heavily insulated roof deck and a central chiller plant with remote air handlers for the climate control system. The Diamond's building was designed by Phoenix architect Bennie Gonzales and featured a Navajo White exterior with simulated skylights and tile floors on the interior. Diamond's was the first anchor to open, opening in early February 1979. JCPenney opened with the grand opening ceremony on February 28, 1979. Goldwater's was the last of the three anchors to open opening on August 11, 1980. General Cinema Theater opened June 15, 1979. It later became a Harkins Theatres then was vacant for almost a decade until Picture Show moved in in 2010.

The mall is the hub of a master planned community called Paradise Valley Village. The entire project was developed by Westcor, the leading shopping center developer in Arizona, which is now a unit of The Macerich Company. Dayton Hudson Corporation, now Target Corporation, was an early investor in the project and owned the Diamond's department store chain, which was one of the original anchor tenants.

=== Expansion ===
The mall was expanded in the late 1980s with two additional anchor stores built to the north of the original structure. The expansion consisted of two new wings, with the northeast wing housing a new anchor store for Dillard's. Also in this wing a restaurant space was built which last housed Chompie's. The northwest wing housed additional stores as well as a new Broadway store which would later become Macy's. The new wings featured the same parquet flooring and an updated tile pattern. Between the two new wings a three-story parking garage was constructed at the same time, directly north of the original food court. The original part of the mall would undergo a modest renovation at this time that would add more skylights and updated tile in place of the Terrazzo. The construction of the new wings was completed by The Weitz Company Inc., with Kitchell Contractors Inc. building the Broadway store.

A carousel was installed off the food court in 1998. In the early 2000s the mall was once again renovated, with many of the indoor planters removed and new flooring installed throughout the mall. The food court was also renovated at this time. The northwest wing would be demolished in 2008 to make way for a new Costco.

Originally owned by Westcor, in 2002 Paradise Valley Mall became part of The Macerich Company's portfolio.

=== Development and decline ===
Paradise Valley Mall is just west of Scottsdale. Much of the area's original development was spurred by that community, although the demographics of Paradise Valley Village have changed over the years to be less upscale and more middle-class. During the 1980s and 1990s, new extensions were constructed, and shopping centers also opened on the ring roads. Paradise Valley Mall has a large park-and-ride stop for Valley Metro buses. An elevated rail station, as part of the 1989 ValTrans proposal, had been slated for construction here, but the referendum was voted down.

The owners also added improvements in 2001 intended to attract teenagers and young families, a move made necessary by it being the oldest mall in the area. Paradise Valley Mall remains several times its original size, with a gross leasable area of 1,222,353 square feet (113,560.3 m^{2}).

Since the early 2000s, higher-income shoppers became more inclined to shop at newer facilities such as Kierland Commons and the Scottsdale Road/Frank Lloyd Wright Boulevard corridor, which features power centers that cater to upscale shoppers. This caused Paradise Valley Mall retailers such as Macy's to carry fewer high-end name-brand goods and sell items more in line with a middle-income customer base.

In the early 2010s, the retail climate started changing, causing several chain stores to close in the mall. Over time the mall contained more small businesses and fewer chain stores.

On November 8, 2018, it was announced that Sears would be closing this location as part of a plan to close 40 stores nationwide. The store closed in February 2019.

On November 18, 2020, it was announced that Dillard's would also be closing their store at Paradise Valley Mall on May 10, 2021.

In December 2020, the Picture Show Movie Theater permanently closed.

On January 6, 2021, it was announced that Macy's would be closing in April 2021 as part of a plan to close 46 stores nationwide. As of late March 2021, the Macy's anchor store has been permanently closed. Costco and JCPenney are now the only anchor stores left.

When the mall permanently closed on March 31, 2021; JCPenney, Costco, Bath & Body Works and Chompie's were the only open businesses left in/near the mall. Bath & Body Works closed at the end of April and Chompie's closed on May 31, while JCPenney and Costco will not close for now.

On April 1, 2021 Macerich announced that it sold a majority stake of Paradise Valley Mall to Phoenix based developer RED Development Company for $100 Million.

Demolition lasted from July 2021 to February 2022, when plans were announced for the future development. A small section of the mall connected to JCPenney stood until April 2024.

== Surrounding area ==
The mall is surrounded by a circular street named Paradise Village Parkway. Tatum Boulevard and Cactus Road intersect within the circle, thus creating four quadrants.

The Northwest quadrant consists of the original mall and its parking lot. The parking lot is accessed by a circular access road called the Paradise Valley Mall Loop. Between the parking lot and Tatum Boulevard are several restaurant buildings constructed in the 1980s. Several restaurant buildings of the same era are also along Cactus Road. The Phoenix Public Library Mesquite Branch is located north of the mall on Paradise Village Parkway; it opened circa 1980 and was designed by local architect Will Bruder.

The Northeast quadrant consists of the Village Plaza and Village Fair shopping centers, as well as The Paradise Plaza shopping and medical center. There is also an In-N-Out Burger located in the parking lot of the Village Plaza, and a Red Lobster and Olive Garden located on Cactus Road south of Paradise Plaza.

The Southeast quadrant (also called Paradise Village Crossroads) was the last of the quadrants to be developed. It consists of the Village Crossroads Shopping Center and the Paradise Valley Corporate Center. There are also restaurant buildings located in the parking lot of the shopping center including Outback Steakhouse and Chick-fil-A.

The Southwest quadrant consists of the Village Square I and II shopping centers, Jackson's Car Wash, and several apartment buildings. There is also an APS substation south of Village Square II.

The only other retail center is the Village Center, which is located outside the loop to the West of Paradise Village Parkway.

The first shopping center constructed was the Village Plaza, which predates the mall by several months. It was completed in the fall of 1978. The anchors consist of a CVS Pharmacy (originally a Skagg's Drug Store, then an Osco Drug) and a Sprouts Farmers Market (originally Alpha Beta, later renamed ABCO). The rest of the plaza contains small shops. The exterior of Village Plaza was renovated in the late 2000s. Natural stone was added to the building's facade, new sidewalks and plantings were installed, and the buildings were given an updated color scheme.

After the completion of the mall, Village Square I was constructed in 1979. It is anchored by TJ Maxx, Aldi (formerly a Mor Furniture and Stein Mart) and HomeGoods (formerly a Borders).

Village Square II was constructed in 1980, anchored by a Big 5 Sporting Goods and a Mervyn's department store. The Mervyn's store closed in 2008 and the space was split in half, containing Hobby Lobby and Tuesday Morning until 2024 and 2023 respectively. The building became an IKEA in 2026. The rest of the center consists of smaller businesses. The exterior of Village Square II was renovated in 2012, with the original slump block stuccoed smooth, and colorful awnings installed over the storefronts.

Paradise Plaza was constructed in 1982, and consists mostly of furniture stores and medical offices.

Village Center was constructed in the mid-1980s, and is anchored by Target, Dollar Tree and REI.

Village Fair North was constructed in the late 1980s, and is anchored by EoS Fitness (formerly Sports Authority), Office Max, Ulta Beauty, a 99 Cent Only store that became Dollar Tree in 2024, and a Toys "R" Us that closed in 2018. The shopping center was expanded in 1993, with a new building housing Best Buy.

Development of Paradise Village Crossroads began with Village Crossroads constructed in 1993, anchored by a Montgomery Ward. The space containing Montgomery Ward is now occupied by a Walmart Supercenter. The Paradise Valley Corporate Center was constructed in 2001, and was built upon the last piece of open land within the parkway.

The immediate area surrounding the parkway consists of apartments to the north, south and west, the Stone Creek Golf Club, Embassy Suites Hotel and the Paradise Village Office Park to the south and single-family homes to the east.

== In popular culture ==
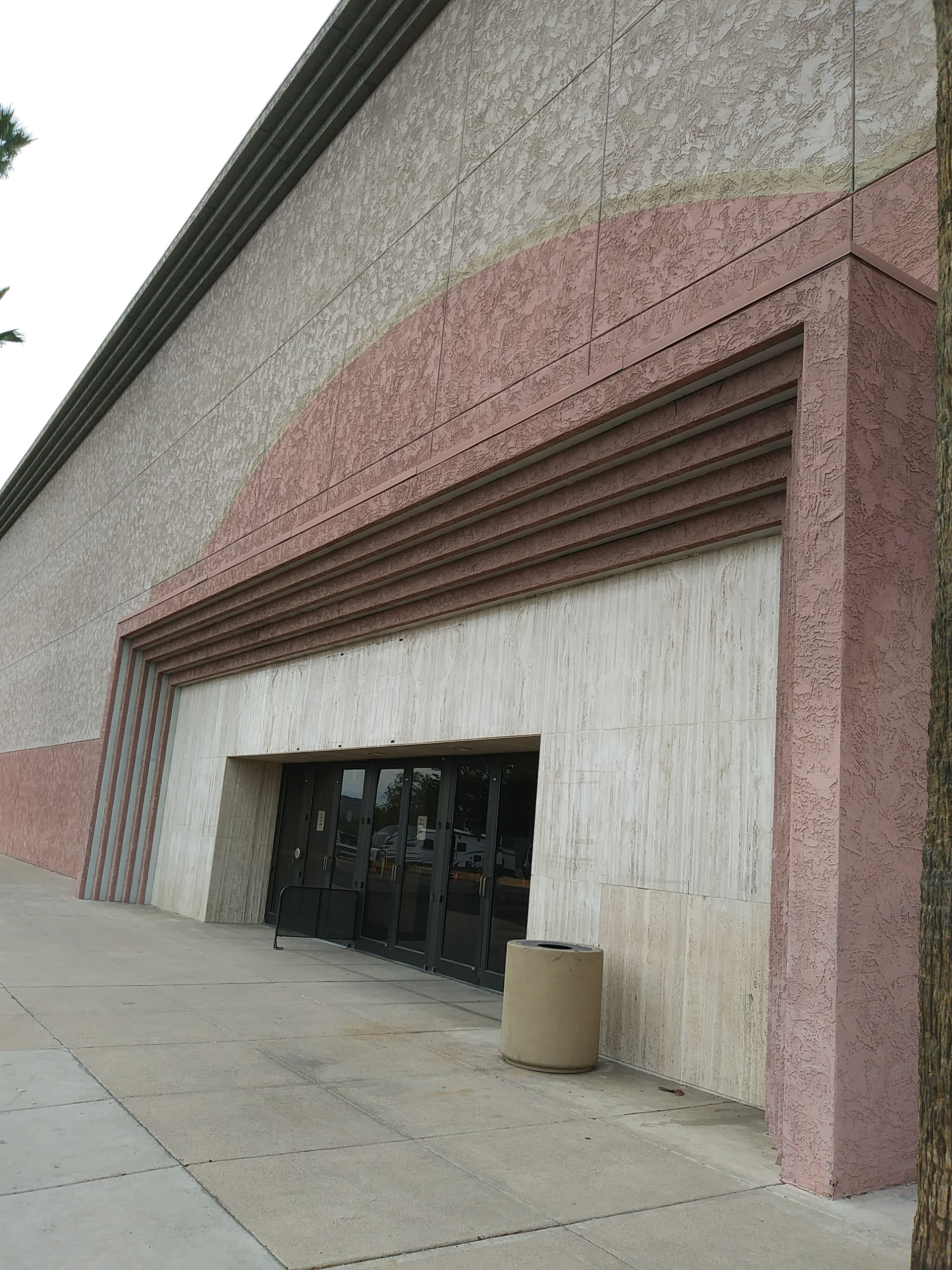
Former Sears building, now demolished

In 1987, the mall was used in the filming of Bill & Ted's Excellent Adventure as the exterior of the fictional San Dimas Mall. This footage was later cut, and does not appear in the final film. Interior mall scenes were filmed at the nearby Metrocenter Mall.

== Plans ==
=== Transportation ===
Currently, most visitors arrive by car, but there are plans to extend the Valley Metro Rail to serve Paradise Valley Mall and other parts of the northeastern area. Such improvements are not part of the current development phase and are not expected until the 2020s. Long-term plans include the construction of Valley Metro Rail powered by Overhead lines further north along Tatum Boulevard, as well as frequent "supergrid" bus service.

=== Redevelopment ===
Paradise Valley Mall has long been called a redevelopment property by its owner Macerich. In December 2020, Macerich filed a request with the City of Phoenix to re-zone Paradise Valley Mall as a mixed use development. Macerich, along with Red Development Company, will turn the mall into a lifestyle center with a self storage center and multi-family residential units. The development will resemble the developments of Desert Ridge Marketplace and Kierland Commons. It was approved by the city, and the first phase of the project will include replacing the vacant Sears with multi-family residential units. Future phases of the redevelopment have yet to be announced.

Official demolition of the mall began in July 2021, starting with the vacant Sears.

Demolition ended in February 2022, leaving the west wing attached to JCPenney. On February 24 plans for the future development were announced, including renaming the project to PV. Phase one of PV plans opened in late 2024 and includes a Whole Foods Market, a park with a pavilion and apartment buildings. It was originally planned to have a Harkins dine-in luxury theater.
