= Fiesta Mall =

Defunct mall in Mesa, Arizona, U.S.

- Location: Mesa, Arizona, United States
- Coordinates: 33.3930°N 111.8626°W
- Address: 1445 West Southern Avenue
- Opened: October 8, 1979
- Closed: January 2018
- Demolished: July 2023 – 2024
- Developer: Homart Development Company
- Owner: Verde Investments
- Architect: Architectonics, Inc.
- Num. of stores: 150 at peak
- Num. of anchor tenants: 5 at peak
- Floor area: 1,200,000 square feet (110,000 m^{2}) (GLA)
- Floors: 2
- Website: Archived 2016-10-27 at the Wayback Machine

The Fiesta Mall was a shopping mall in Mesa, Arizona, United States. Opened in 1979 after nine years of development, it was constructed by Homart Development Company, the former shopping mall development division of the department store Sears. Sears was the first anchor store to open in the mall, doing so in 1977. Also present as anchor stores were The Broadway and Goldwater's, with Diamond's following in 1980. The mall began experiencing declines in traffic following the opening of Arizona Mills in 1997, and saw numerous anchor store and inline tenancy changes. After a long period of decline, it was shuttered in January 2018. It would be demolished between July 2023 and 2024.

== History ==
=== Early years ===
The development that would become Fiesta Mall was announced on October 8, 1970, by officials from the city and Sears, Roebuck and Company. Sears officials said the company would develop the mall, which would include one of their stores, through its subsidiary Homart Development Company. The mall was projected to cost $35 million to $55 million and encompass 1.2 million to 1.4 million square-feet of retail space on 120 acres. Its projected opening was 1973. By 1973, the opening date for what was at the time called the "Sierra Vista Mall" was listed as 1975. Development shifted to Mesa after Homart could not secure land in south Tempe.

The first component of the mall to open was the Sears, on April 13, 1977. The store replaced the retailer's location in downtown Mesa.

Fiesta Mall officially opened October 3, 1979, with Sears, The Broadway and Goldwater's as its first three anchor stores; the fourth anchor, Diamond's, opened July 4, 1980. Architectonics, Inc. of Chicago was architect, the mall was developed by Homart, which at the time of the opening of Fiesta Mall was developing several shopping centers nationwide anchored by Sears retail locations.

Fiesta Mall and other large developments in the area such as Desert Samaritan Hospital (now known as Banner Desert Medical Center) were facilitated to a great extent by population growth in the southeast Valley and the construction of the Superstition Freeway.

In June 1982, Sears, Roebuck and Co. sold a 50 percent stake in the mall to Grosvenor International. The selling price was not disclosed. Under the deal, Homart remained as the mall's management firm.

Homart announced plans in 1985 to grow the mall by nearly 40 percent from 921,046 to about 1.3 million square feet. Part of the company's $50 million expansion plans included a fifth department store and an expansion to the Sears; in addition, the existing Diamond's would have been converted into mall space and a new Diamond's store built in a three-story addition. Homart withdrew plans the following year after several delays due to concerns about traffic and parking from the city and other developers with nearby properties.

Fiesta's owners renovated the mall in 1989, doing away with the orange and brown color scheme of the 1970s and installing skylights.

By the early-1990s, Fiesta Mall was at the zenith of its success. It was the commercial hub of the East Valley and ranked within the top 15 percentile of regional malls in the nation in sales. A survey conducted by The Arizona Republic and The Phoenix Gazette in 1992 identified the mall as the preferred shopping center for most Valley residents, and in 1993, as many as a dozen companies were vying to purchase Fiesta. L&B Real Estate Counsel of Dallas, a commercial real-estate investment firm, bought the mall for $124.3 million in December 1993. Citing continuing robust population growth in the southeast Valley, the owners announced new plans for a major expansion that again included a fifth anchor store.

General Growth Properties Inc. acquired Homart and all of its malls in December 1995. Fiesta's management announced in July 2001 that they were searching for a buyer, but said it had nothing to do with increasing competition from newer malls in the area.

On April 13, 2004, pop music star Avril Lavigne hosted a free concert at Fiesta Mall, drawing about 3,000 people. The concert was seen as a coup for Fiesta, which was responding to changing times by updating its entrances and adding a children's play area.

=== Decline and closure ===
Fiesta Mall started showing early signs of trouble in terms of shrinking customer traffic in the late 1990s. When Arizona Mills opened in the neighboring city of Tempe in 1997, mall officials saw an initial decline in shoppers. Fiesta management said the change was short-lived after initial interest in the new mall peaked. When Chandler Fashion Center opened on October 17, 2001, about eight miles away from Fiesta, the mall suffered its first sustained revenue drop due to a competing mall.

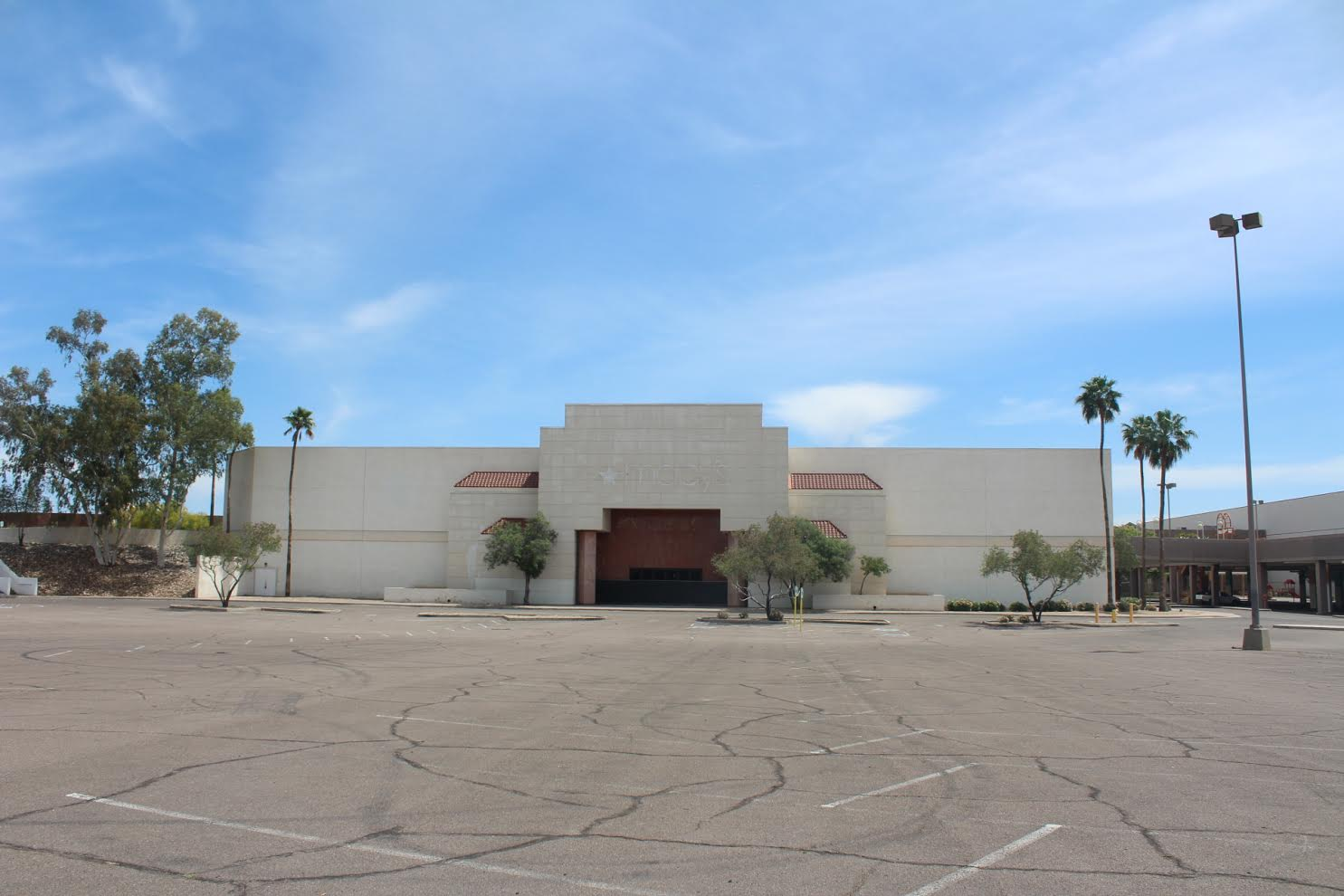
The west-facing side of the former Macy's store at Fiesta Mall. Macy's closed in 2014.

In March 2004, a study commissioned by the city and conducted by the International Economic Development Council and the International Council of Shopping Centers said the mall faced significant obstacles as a future competitor in the local retail market. The study reported decreasing sales and difficulty attracting "top-tier stores" due to increasing competition from newer shopping centers and changing demographics. The study also noted recent increases in crime and gang activity in the immediate area surrounding the mall. Despite the mall's challenges, the study's authors reported that sales per square foot remained "well above the threshold for 'vulnerable malls' of $275 or less, according to the Urban Land Institute." The authors also noted that there were "almost no vacant spaces in the mall."

Fiesta Mall was acquired by Westcor for $135 million in 2004, a time when the center appeared to be showing significant signs of decline.

The period between 2006 and 2008 proved to be pivotal in Fiesta Mall's overall decline. In 2006, the mall lost one of its four anchors following the merger between Macy's and Robinsons-May; the vacated anchor was split into Best Buy and Dick's Sporting Goods. The mall's sales continued to dwindle following the economic recession and the opening of Mesa Riverview and Tempe Marketplace in 2007.

During this time, reported crime at and around the mall continued to increase. In 2007, Mesa police reported a jump in gang activity at Fiesta, although mall officials denied there was a rise. Police officials said calls for service increased about 71 percent from 2005 to 2007.

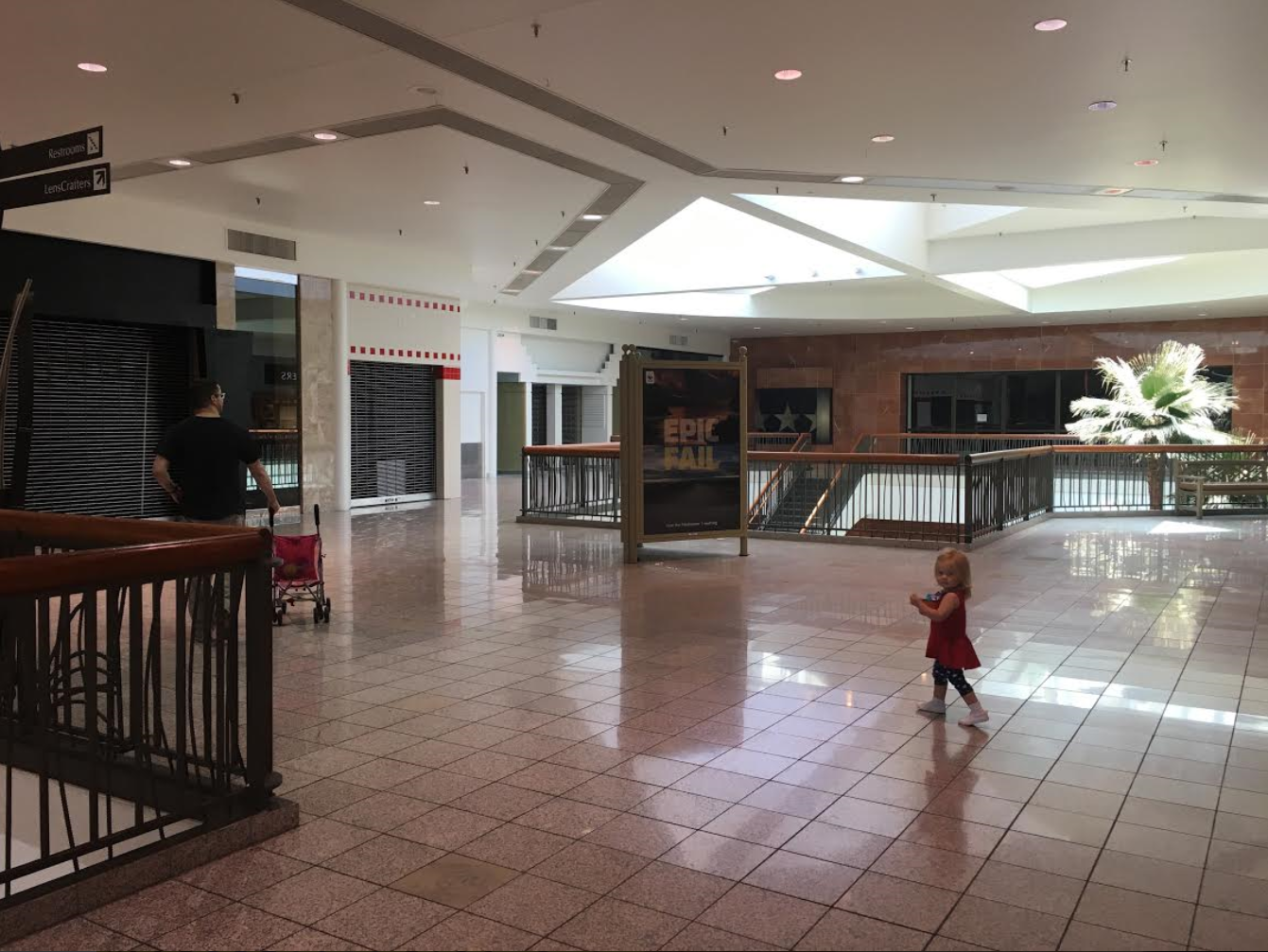
Visitors mill inside the mall's wing that Macy's department store once anchored. Vacancy rates hit unprecedented highs in the years following the 2008 recession.

On March 31, 2008, a man stabbed two mall patrons, including one fatally. Authorities said the suspect had links to gangs and had a history of mental health issues. Police reported a spike in property crimes including car thefts from 2007 to 2008.

In January 2012, police arrested a documented gang member in the beating and attempted robbery of another man near Fiesta Mall. On October 1, 2012, a woman was robbed at gunpoint at the mall.

In March 2013, the mall was appraised at $39.5 million — a 72 percent decline from its worth in 2004. In September 2013, Westcor turned over Fiesta Mall to its lenders due to “imminent default relating to potential tenancy issues".

Macy's closed in early 2014, sparking fears over the mall's possible demise. As of October 2016, only 35 businesses were still operating at the mall, which had more than 100 tenant spaces.

On January 27, 2018, the mall closed permanently, except for Dillard's Clearance Center.

On September 28, 2019, it was announced that Dillard's would close their doors. This left the mall with no remaining tenants.

In March 2023, it was announced that the mall would be demolished.

On July 17, 2023, demolition finally started. The demolition started on the former Macy's and continued throughout the mall. Demolition was completed in 2024.

=== Attempted redevelopment ===
LNR Properties sold the mall to Dimension Financial & Realty Investments in 2017. Dimension said it planned to spend $30 million to convert the property into a campus focusing on education and healthcare for community colleges and for-profit schools. (Mesa Community College and Banner Desert Medical Center are just west of the mall.) The deal does not include the mall's four anchor properties, which are owned by other companies. In October 2017, Cashen Real Estate Advisors, which markets the property for Dimension, proposed the mall for Amazon's HQ2; it did not make the finalist tier.

On May 18, 2023, it was announced that the Arizona Coyotes have considered the mall site for a new arena for the team, after the Tempe Arena proposal was rejected by Tempe voters a couple days earlier. The Coyotes continued playing at the Mullett Arena for the 2023–24 NHL season, while plans to play at the Mall were ultimately rejected for unknown reasons.

== Anchors and majors ==
Fiesta Mall opened with three anchor department stores—Goldwaters, The Broadway and Sears. Diamond's opened later as the mall's fourth anchor.

Goldwaters first became J.W. Robinson's in 1989. Four years later, it became Robinsons-May. The Broadway became Macy's in 1996. Macy's then moved into the Robinsons-May building after the two companies merged in 2006. Macy's closed in the spring of 2014.

The space previously occupied by The Broadway and the mall's first Macy's store hosted a Dick's Sporting Goods and a Best Buy in 2007. Both of those stores closed in 2016.

Diamond's became Dillard's in 1986, and later converted to a Clearance Center in 2009. This store closed in January 2020.

On November 2, 2017, it was announced that Sears would be closing as part of a plan to close 63 stores nationwide. The store closed on January 28, 2018.

== See also ==
- Dead mall
