= The Broadway =

Department store chain

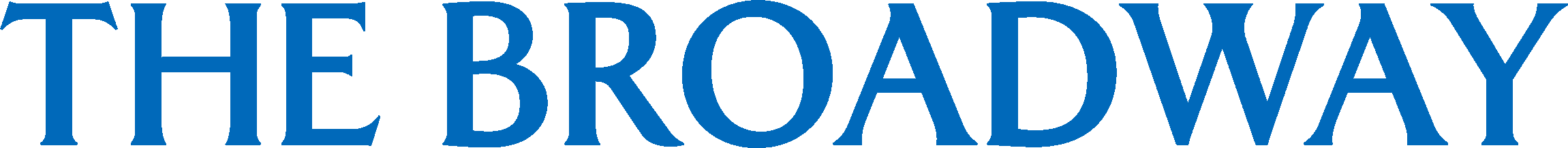
- Type: Subsidiary
- Industry: Retail
- Genre: Department Store
- Founded: February 24, 1896; 130 years ago
- Founder: Arthur Letts Sr.
- Defunct: 1996; 30 years ago
- Fate: Converted to Macy's
- Successor: Macy’s
- Headquarters: Los Angeles, California
- Products: Clothing, footwear, bedding, furniture, jewelry, beauty products, and housewares.
- Parent: Broadway Stores (1950-1995); Federated Department Stores (1995-1996)
- Website: None

The Broadway was a mid-level department store chain headquartered in Los Angeles, California. Founded in 1896 by English-born Arthur Letts Sr., and named after what was once the city's main shopping street, the Broadway became a dominant retailer in Southern California and the Southwest. Its fortunes eventually declined, and Federated Department Stores (now Macy's, Inc.) bought the chain in 1995. In 1996, Broadway stores were either closed or converted into Macy's and Bloomingdales, some of which were sold and converted to Sears, including the Stonewood Center and Whittwood Town Center locations.

== History ==
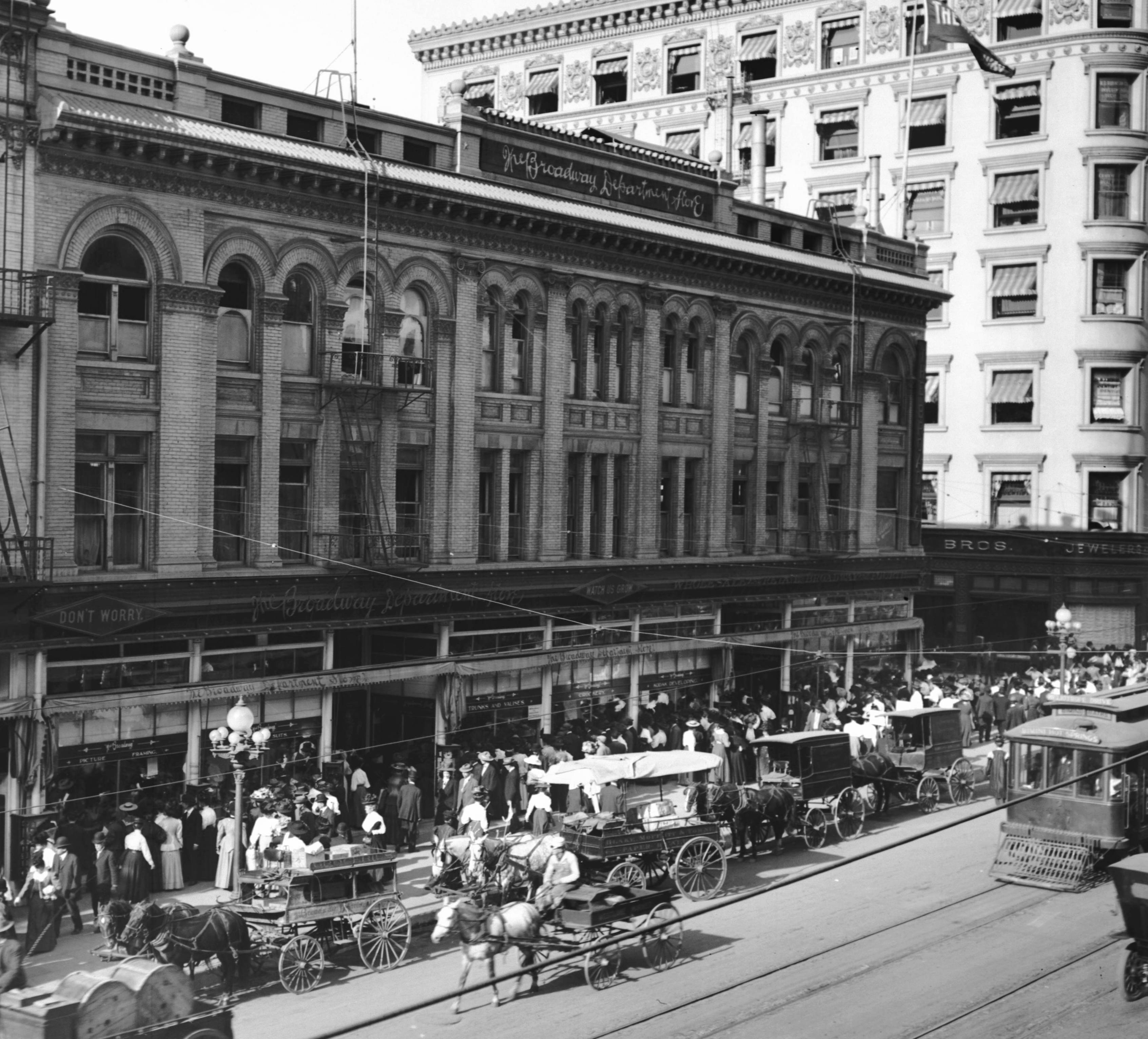
Original Broadway store as seen around 1908–1910

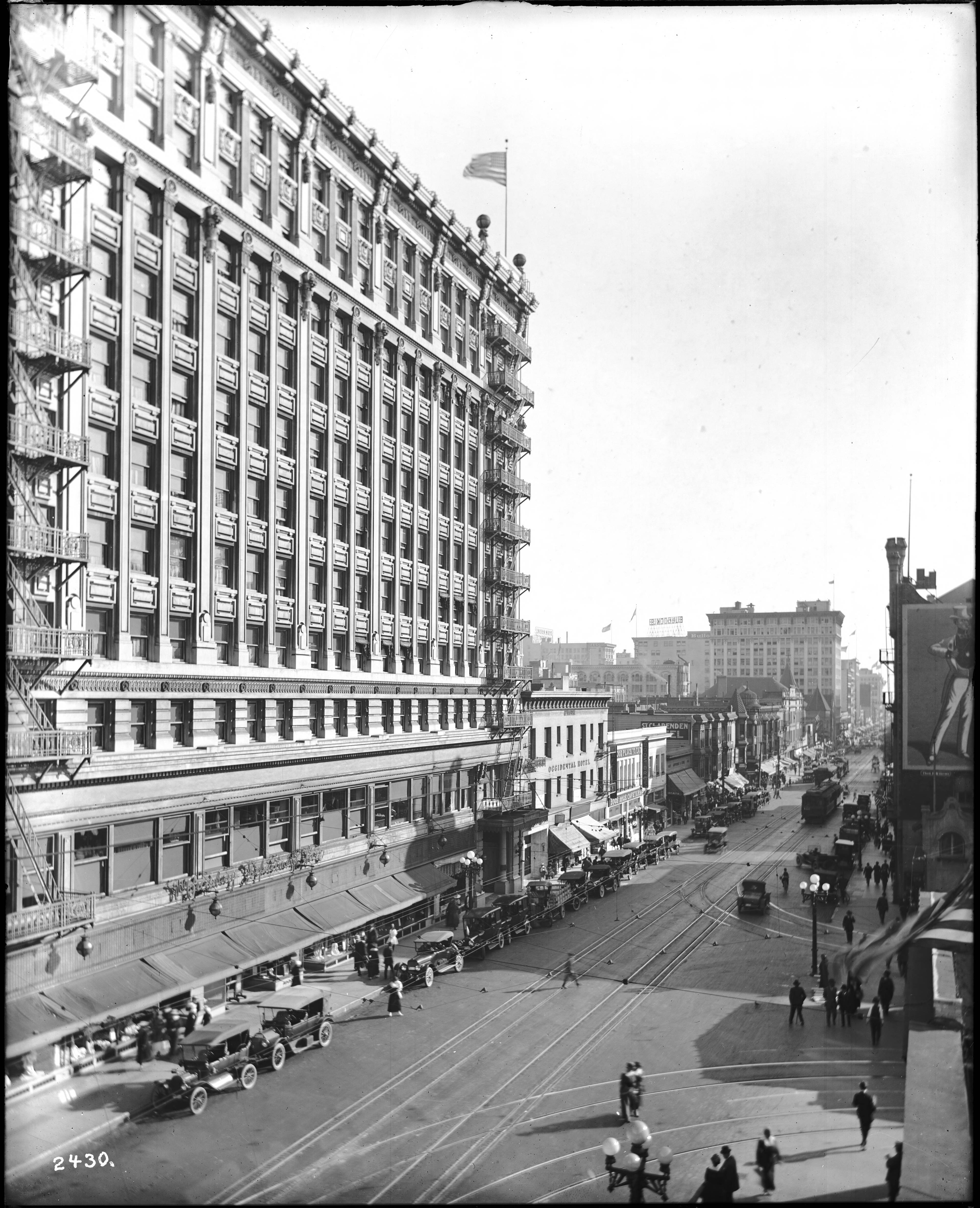
Back entrance, east side of Hill between 4th and 5th.

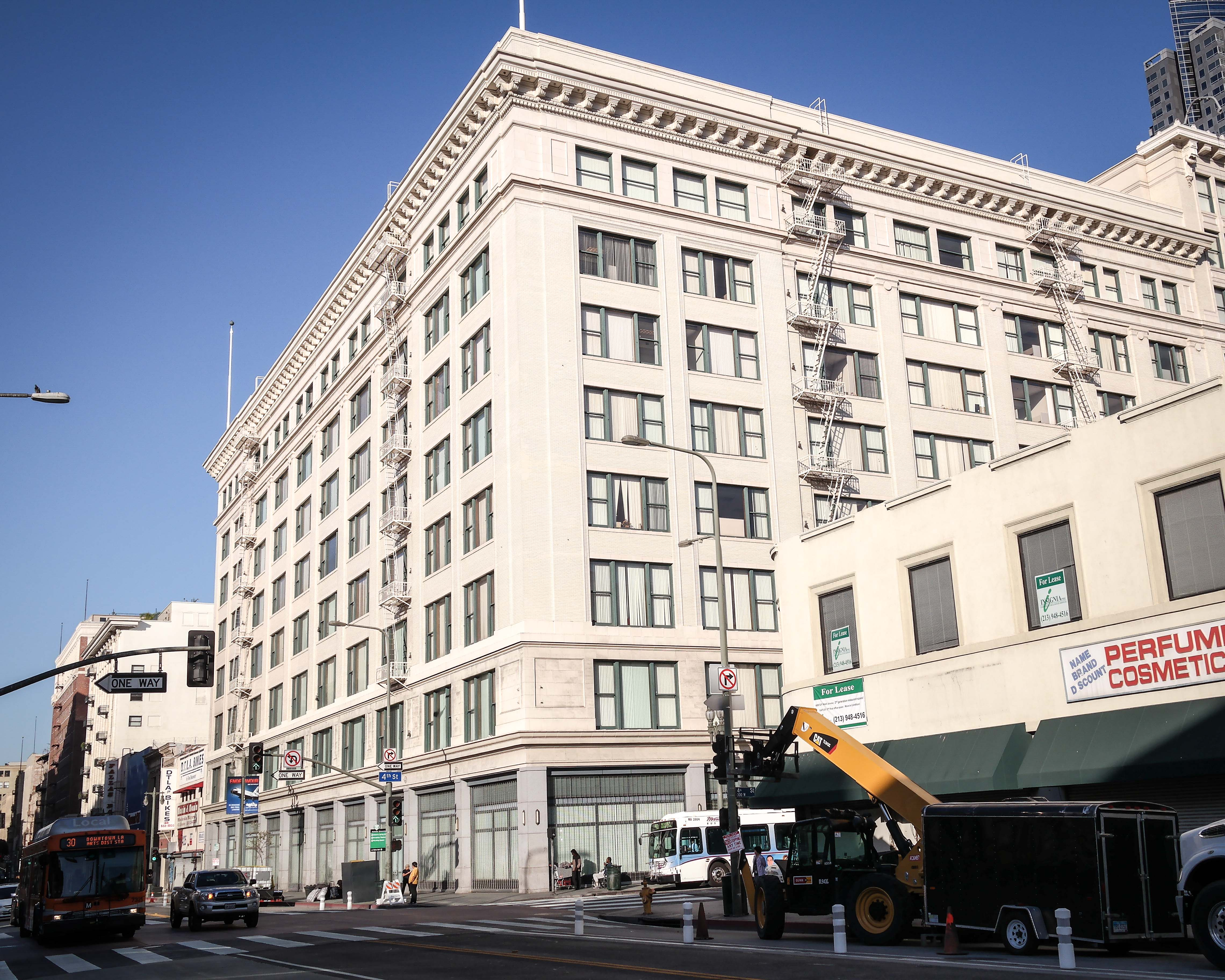
The 1913–1973 Downtown Los Angeles flagship store

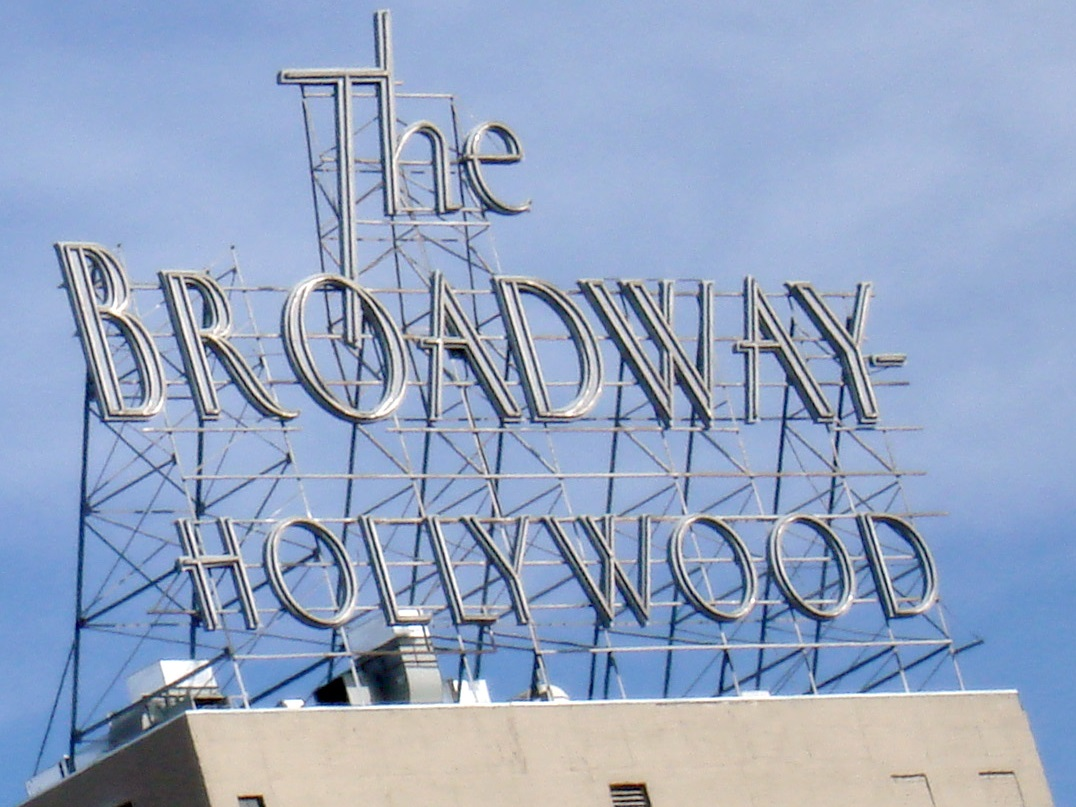
Sign atop the former Broadway-Hollywood branch, still present today long after the store's closure

=== Origins ===
In 1895, J. A. Williams formed J. A. Williams & Co., built and opened his J. A. Williams & Co. Dry Goods Store on August 29, 1895 in the new Hallett & Pirtle Building designed by Frederick Rice Dorn, who would later design the Marsh-Strong building and The Broadway Hollywood. Williams had a 30-foot storefront along Broadway, occupying only part of the building's ground floor. Other tenants included Pearson Draperies, the La Veta restaurant, medical offices, apartments, and later on the Hotel Savoy.

In February, 1896, Williams went bankrupt and his store was liquidated. Arthur Letts bought the (by then "The Broadway Department Store") name, assets, fixtures, and lease for $8,377. On February 24th of that year, The Broadway started operating under Letts. The previous owners had a good location in a recently constructed building at the southwest corner of Broadway and Fourth Streets, but had all of its assets seized by their creditors for failure to pay its bills after just four short months of operations. In contrast, Letts was able to pay off all of his creditors in a short period of time after acquiring the assets for the failed store by the quick sale of the same assets and by watching his expenses.

In a short period of time, the business was doing so well, that it had to expand into adjacent store fronts.

=== The New and Greater Broadway (1914–15) ===
Between 1900 and 1910, the population of Los Angeles more than tripled. Bullock's, in 1907, and Hamburger's (later May Co.), in 1908, had both opened stores occupying entire city blocks. It was clear to Letts that The Broadway needed a new, much larger building.

In 1912 The Broadway announced plans for a new nine-story building with nearly 11 acres of floor space to be built at the same location (320 W. Fourth St., southwest corner of Broadway, now the Junipero Serra state office building). The building was completed in 1915.

The new "New and Greater Broadway store", as it was advertised, had 242 feet (74 m) of storefront along Broadway and 166 feet (51 m) along Fourth Street. It was 9 stories high and covered 11 acres (4.5 ha), stretching from Broadway all the way west to Hill Street, which also had an entrance.

On November 10, 1924, The Broadway added another building, 80 feet (24 m) wide and 123 feet (37 m) deep, immediately west of the main building along Fourth Street, thus adding 119,790 square feet (11,129 m^{2}) of floor space over ten above-ground and three below-ground floors. It added six passenger and three freight elevators.

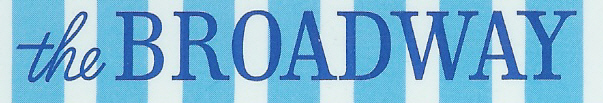
Classic logo

In summary, the Downtown flagship store evolved in size as follows:

| Date | Total floor space | | Remarks |
| Date | Sq ft | Sq m | Remarks |
|---|---|---|---|
| 1898 | 12,000 | 1,100 | 30-foot storefront along Broadway, occupying only part of the ground floor of the 1895 Hallett & Pirtle Building, taking over the bankrupt J. A. Williams & Co. dry goods store. |
| 1900 | 19,520 | 1,813 | |
| 1902 | 28,520 | 2,650 | By 1901, had grown to a 200-foot storefront along Broadway |
| 1904 | 48,040 | 4,463 | |
| 1905 | c. 89,700 | c. 8,332 | Acquired use of 2nd and 3rd floors above the original 1896 store, which had been the Hotel Savoy. This added 41,650 sq ft (3,869 m^{2}). |
| June 25, 1915 | 457,210 | 42,476 | New building opens. |
| November 10, 1924 | 577,000 | 53,600 | New 119,790 sq ft (11,129 m^{2}) building on 4th Street added to the west. |

=== Suburban expansion ===
In 1931, The Broadway bought the B. H. Dyas Hollywood store which became the Broadway-Hollywood.

In 1940, The Broadway built a landmark three-story store in Pasadena, at the corner of Colorado and Los Robles on the site of the old famous Maryland Hotel. The striking Streamline Moderne building had a 117-foot tower with a marquee facing both streets, and parking for 400 cars. It would be abandoned in 1980 for a newly built store across the street in the new Plaza Pasadena mall.

In 1950, the company merged with Sacramento-based Hale Brothers to form Broadway-Hale Stores. In the same year it purchased the year-old Westchester branch of Milliron's and converted it to a Broadway. The store, designed by legendary retail architect Victor Gruen, was a considered a model of ultra-modern retail architecture at the time, with rooftop parking and striking, angular design designed to attract passing motorists.

The Broadway bought out competitors in Los Angeles (B.H. Dyas, Milliron's, and Coulter's), and expanded into new markets through acquisitions of small local chains: Marston's in San Diego and Korricks in Phoenix. In later years the Broadway opened stores in Nevada (Las Vegas), New Mexico, and Colorado. In 1979, it was split into two divisions: The Broadway Southern California, based in Los Angeles; and Broadway Southwest, headquartered in Phoenix, for the stores outside California.

=== Dissolution ===
The Broadway's parent Carter Hawley Hale Stores ran into financial difficulties which resulted from poor management decisions and hostile takeover attempts. In 1996 the chain was acquired by Federated Department Stores and the majority of locations were converted to the Macy's nameplate. Several stores in affluent areas where Macy's already had locations, South Coast Plaza, Sherman Oaks Fashion Square, Century City Shopping Center, Beverly Center, and Fashion Island Newport Beach, were closed, refurbished and reopened as Bloomingdale's. Federated sold many of the remaining stores to Sears.

== Store list ==
This is a list of the Broadway store numbers with their locations and opening dates:

| Store no. | Store name | Mall or address | (District &) City (state=CA unless stated) | Opening date | Architect | Sq. ft. at opening | Closing date | Current building use |
|---|---|---|---|---|---|---|---|---|
| 01 | Downtown | 320 West Fourth Street (southwest corner of Broadway and Fourth Street); Original 1896 building | Historic Core, Downtown L.A. | February 24, 1896 | | | August 8, 1914 | demolished in phases 1913-5 |
| 01 | Downtown | Broadway Mart Center, 320 West Fourth Street (southwest corner of Broadway and Fourth Street through to Hill Street) ("New and Greater Broadway" 1913-5 bldgs.) | Downtown L.A. | March 11, 1913 (W.), October 8, 1914 (S.), June 25, 1915 (N.) | John Joseph (J. J.) Frauenfelder of Parkinson & Bergstrom. | Claimed nearly 11 acres (480,000 sq ft) | November 15, 1973 | Junipero Serra State Office Bldg. |
| 01 | Plaza | Broadway Plaza (now The Bloc), 700 South Flower Street | Downtown L.A. | November 16, 1973 | Charles Luckman & Assoc. | | 2025 | vacant |
| 02 | Hollywood | Broadway Hollywood Building, 6300 West Hollywood Boulevard & 1645 North Vine Street | Hollywood, L.A. | September 3, 1931 as B. H. Dyas | Frederick Rice Dorn | 172,000 | February 13, 1982 | |
| 03 | Pasadena | 401 East Colorado Boulevard | Pasadena | November 15, 1940 | | | August 15, 1980 | demolished 1980 |
| 04 | Crenshaw (renamed Baldwin Hills in 1988) | Broadway-Crenshaw Center, later renamed Baldwin Hills Crenshaw Plaza | Crenshaw, L.A. | November 21, 1947 | Albert B. Gardner | 200,000 (5 stories) | November 1996 | vacant |
was Macy's until 1999/Walmart until 2016
| 05 | Westchester | 8739 Sepulveda Boulevard | Westchester, L.A. | August 18, 1950 | Victor Gruen | 90,000 | October 14, 1990 | vacant |
March 17, 1949 as Milliron's Westchester, purchased by Broadway June 29, 1950/first became Mervyn's until 2009
| 06 | Valley (renamed Panorama City) | Panorama City Shopping Center, now Panorama Mall | Panorama City, S.F.V., L.A. | October 10, 1955 | Welton Becket & Assoc. | 226,000 | 1996 | Walmart |
initially was going to be a Macy's
| 07 | Anaheim | Anaheim Plaza | Anaheim | October 14, 1955 | Welton Becket & Assoc. | 208,000 | January 31, 1993 | demolished, now site of power center |
| 08 | Long Beach | Los Altos Market Place | Los Altos, Long Beach | November 14, 1955 as Walker's | Welton Becket & Assoc. (1955), Charles Luckman & Assoc. (1963 expansion) | 100,000 | 1996 | Sports Basement |
originally a Walker's, became Broadway in 1957, then became Sears until 2021
| 09 | Del Amo | Broadway/Del Amo Shopping Center | Torrance | February 16, 1959 | | | | Dick's Sporting Goods & Jo-Ann Fabrics |
Was planned to be Bloomingdales. Was Macy's home until 2014 (now Dick's Sporting Goods)
| 10 | Wilshire | 5600 Wilshire Boulevard | Miracle Mile, L.A. | August 3, 1960 | | | closed 1980 | demolished |
originally a Coulter's
| 11 | Whittier | Whittwood Center | Whittier | February 13, 1961 | | | 1996 | vacant |
originally planned to be Macy's, was Sears until 2025
| 61 | Downtown Phoenix | 1 North First Street | Phoenix, Arizona | acquired 1962 | Henry C. Trost, Trost & Trost | | 1966 | |
opened as Korricks' in 1914
| 62 | Chris-Town | Chris-Town Mall, now Christown Spectrum Mall | Phoenix, Arizona | August 21, 1961 | Welton Becket & Assoc. | | August 31, 1992 | demolished |
now Walmart
| 36 | Grossmont | Grossmont Center | La Mesa, San Diego County | June 11, 1961 as Marston's | Welton Becket & Assoc. | 156,000 | | Macy's |
originally Marston's, rebranded Broadway in 1969
| 12 | West Covina | West Covina Fashion Center, became part of what is now Plaza West Covina | West Covina | June 8, 1962 | | | 1996 | vacant |
was Sears until 2020
| 37 | Chula Vista | Chula Vista Center | Chula Vista | December 11, 1962 | Charles Luckman & Assoc. | | | Macy's |
originally Marston's, rebranded Broadway in 1969
| 13 | Ventura | Buenaventura Plaza, now Pacific View Mall | Ventura | September 30, 1963 | | | | Macy's |
| 14 | Topanga Plaza | Topanga Plaza | Canoga Park, S.F.V., L.A. | August 24, 1964 | | | 1996 | demolished |
was Sears until 2015
| 15 | Century City | Century City Shopping Center | Century City, Westside, L.A. | December 10, 1964 | Welton Becket & Assoc. | | 1996 | Bloomingdale's |
| 16 | Downey | Stonewood Center | Downey | October 18, 1965 | | 143,400 | 1996 | vacant |
was Sears until 2021
| 17 | Huntington Beach | Huntington Center, now Bella Terra, I-405 at Edinger Avenue | Huntington Beach | November 15, 1965 | Charles Luckman & Assoc. | 150,000 | 1996 | Kohl's |
still continued to operate under Broadway name after Macy's renaming in other locations until closure in August 1996.
| 18 | San Bernardino | Inland Center | San Bernardino | August 29, 1966 | Charles Luckman & Assoc. | 158,000 | | Urban Planet |
was Macy's until 2006 (moved to Robinsons-May store), later Forever 21 until 2025
| 19 | Boulevard Mall | The Boulevard Mall | Paradise, Las Vegas Valley, NV | October 17, 1966 | Charles Luckman & Assoc. | | | Anthem Blue Cross Blue Shield offices |
was Macy's until 2017
| 20 | Bakersfield | Valley Plaza Mall | Bakersfield | February 27, 1967 | | | | Macy's |
| 21 | Fashion Island | Fashion Island | Newport Beach | November 9, 1967 | William Pereira, Welton Becket & Assoc. | | 1996 | Bloomingdale's |
| 22 | Montclair | Montclair Plaza | Montclair | May 8, 1968 | Charles Luckman & Assoc. | 142,000 | | Demolished 2018 |
was Macy's until 2006 (moved to Robinsons-May store). Now the site of a new AMC Theatres and Main Event Entertainment
| 63 | Biltmore Fashion Park | Biltmore Fashion Park | Phoenix, AZ | October 28, 1968 | Charles Luckman & Assoc. | | | Macy's |
| 38 | Fashion Valley | Fashion Valley | Mission Valley, San Diego | August 9, 1969 | Charles Luckman & Assoc. | | | Macy's |
| 64 | Scottsdale | Los Arcos Mall | Scottsdale, AZ | October 18, 1969 | Burke, Kober, Nicolais & Archuleta | 156,000 | 1996 | demolished |
| 23 | Riverside | Tyler Mall | Riverside | December 10, 1970 | Charles Luckman & Assoc. | 156,000 | | vacant |
was Macy's until 2006 (moved to Robinsons-May store), later Forever 21 until 2025
| 24 | Orange | Mall of Orange, now The Village at Orange | Orange | August 16, 1971 | Ainsworth and McClellan | 167,500 | 1996 | demolished |
Rebuilt into a Walmart
| 25 | Cerritos | Los Cerritos Center | Cerritos | September 13, 1971 | | 178,000 | | Macy's |
| 26 | Northridge | Northridge Fashion Center | Northridge, S.F.V., L.A. | October 18, 1971 | | | 1996 | Partially demolished |
was planned to become a Bloomingdale's. Still continued to operate under Broadway name after Macy's renaming in other locations until closure in August 1996. It has since been redeveloped into several other stores
| 27 | Carson | Carson Mall, renamed SouthBay Pavilion | Carson | October 9, 1973 | Charles Luckman & Assoc. | | 9/1991 | IKEA |
| 65 | Metrocenter | Metrocenter | Northwest Phoenix, AZ | October 22, 1973 | Charles Luckman & Assoc. | | | demolished |
was Macy's until 2005, now demolished for Walmart Supercenter
| 28 | Puente Hills | Puente Hills Mall | City of Industry | February 18, 1974 | Charles Luckman & Assoc. | 160,000 | 1996 | demolished |
now the site of AMC Theatres
| 29 | Murray, Utah | Fashion Place | Murray, UT | May 8, 1974 | Charles Luckman & Assoc. | | 1993 | demolished |
rebranded as Weinstock's 1/30/78 before being sold to Dillard's in 1993. After Dillard's relocated to the former Sears space in 2015, the building was demolished in 2016 and replaced by a Macy's.
| 66 | Park Mall | Park Mall | Tucson, AZ | August 26, 1974 | Charles Luckman & Assoc. | | | vacant |
was Macy's until 2020
| 30 | Santa Anita | Santa Anita Fashion Park | Arcadia | November 11, 1974 | | | | Macy's |
| 31 | Laguna Hills | Laguna Hills Mall | Laguna Hills | April 8, 1975 | Edward Killingsworth | | | demolished |
was Macy's until 2018, later Open Market OC (Furniture Store) until 2023
| 32 | Fox Hills | Fox Hills Mall | Culver City | June 10, 1975 | William Pereira | 192,470 | | Macy's |
| 67 | Albuquerque | Coronado Center | Albuquerque, NM | December 2, 1976 | Chaix, Pujdak, Bielski, Takeuchi, Daggett Associated Architects & Planers | 159,378 | | Round 1 & Dick's Sporting Goods |
was Macy's until 2006 (moved to Foley's store)/part of store became Gordmans until 2017 (now Round 1)
| 33 | Glendale | Glendale Galleria | Glendale | August 8, 1976 | Jon Jerde | | | Macy's |
| 34 | Hawthorne | Hawthorne Plaza | Hawthorne | December 2, 1977 | Charles Kober & Assoc. | | | abandoned |
| 39 | UTC | University Towne Centre | San Diego | October 15, 1977 | | 155,000 | | Macy's |
| 35 | Sherman Oaks | Sherman Oaks Fashion Square | Sherman Oaks, S.F.V., L.A. | May 11, 1977 | | 183,000 | 1996 | Bloomingdale's |
| 40 | Thousand Oaks | The Oaks | Thousand Oaks | February 18, 1978 | | | | demolished |
was Macy's (Women's & Children's) until 2006 (moved to Robinsons-May store), now the site of Nordstrom
| 42 | Meadows Mall | Meadows Mall | Las Vegas, NV | July 31, 1978 | Charles Kober & Assoc. | | | Macy's |
| 41 | Brea | Brea Mall | Brea | October 21, 1978 | | | | Macy's (Women's) |
was full-line Macy's, now women's store (moved men's, children's, and home departments to former Robinsons-May store)
| 68 | Fiesta Mall | Fiesta Mall | Mesa, Arizona | March 10, 1979 | | | | demolished |
was Macy's until 2006 (moved to Robinsons-May store) building was demolished and replaced by Best Buy and Dick's Sporting Goods, now closed since 2016
| 43 | Carlsbad | Plaza Camino Real, now The Shoppes at Carlsbad | Carlsbad | October 20, 1979 | | | | Macy's (Women's and Children's) |
| 29 | Pasadena | Plaza Pasadena, now Paseo Colorado | Pasadena | August 16, 1980 | Charles Kober & Assoc. | 153,000 | | demolished |
originally planned to become a Sears store. Number recycled from Utah location/was Macy's until 2013. The site was demolished in 2015 and has been rebuilt as a Hyatt Place hotel.
| 44 | Santa Monica Place | Santa Monica Place | Santa Monica | October 16, 1980 | Frank Gehry | | | vacant |
Was Macy's until 2009, Bloomingdale's until 2021
| 45 | Beverly Center | Beverly Center | Beverly Grove, w.L.A. | March 25, 1982 | Lou Nardorf of Welton Becket & Assoc. | | 1996 | Bloomingdale's |
| 47 | Horton Plaza | Horton Plaza | Downtown San Diego | April 10, 1985 | Jon Jerde | | | vacant |
was Macy's until 2020
| 48 | North County Fair | North County Fair | Escondido | February 13, 1986 | | | | Macy's |
| 46 | South Coast Plaza | South Coast Plaza (Crystal Court) | Costa Mesa | October 31, 1986 | | | | Macy's Home |
was initially planned to become a Bloomingdale's.
| 50 | Santa Barbara | Ortega Building, Paseo Nuevo | Santa Barbara | August 17, 1990 | John Field | 140,000 | | vacant |
was Macy's until 2017
opened specifically as Broadway Southwest locations:
| 69 | Tucson Mall | Tucson Mall | Tucson, Arizona | July 16, 1982 | | | | demolished |
was Macy's until 2006 (moved to Robinsons-May store), now REI and Cheesecake Factory
| 70 | Lakewood, CO | Villa Italia Mall, now Belmar | Lakewood, CO | May 11, 1985 | | | 1987 | Dick's Sporting Goods |
later became May D&F, then Foley's until 2001
| 71 | Englewood, CO | Cinderella City | Englewood, CO | May 11, 1985 | | | 1987 | Englewood Public Library and City Hall |
later became May D&F, then Foley's until 1994
| 72 | Westminster, CO | Westminster Mall | Westminster, CO | October 30, 1986 | | | 1996 | demolished |
became Sears until 2012
| 73 | Paradise Valley, AZ | Paradise Valley Mall | Paradise Valley, AZ | February 17, 1991 | | | | demolished |
was Macy's until 2006 (moved to Robinsons-May store), now Costco

The last Broadway Southwest store was originally planned to be built at Superstition Springs Center mall in Mesa, Arizona. But due to the attempted hostile takeover by The Limited, construction was halted. And as a result, it started doing business as Robinsons-May instead in 1994 (now Macy's since 2006).

== Gallery ==
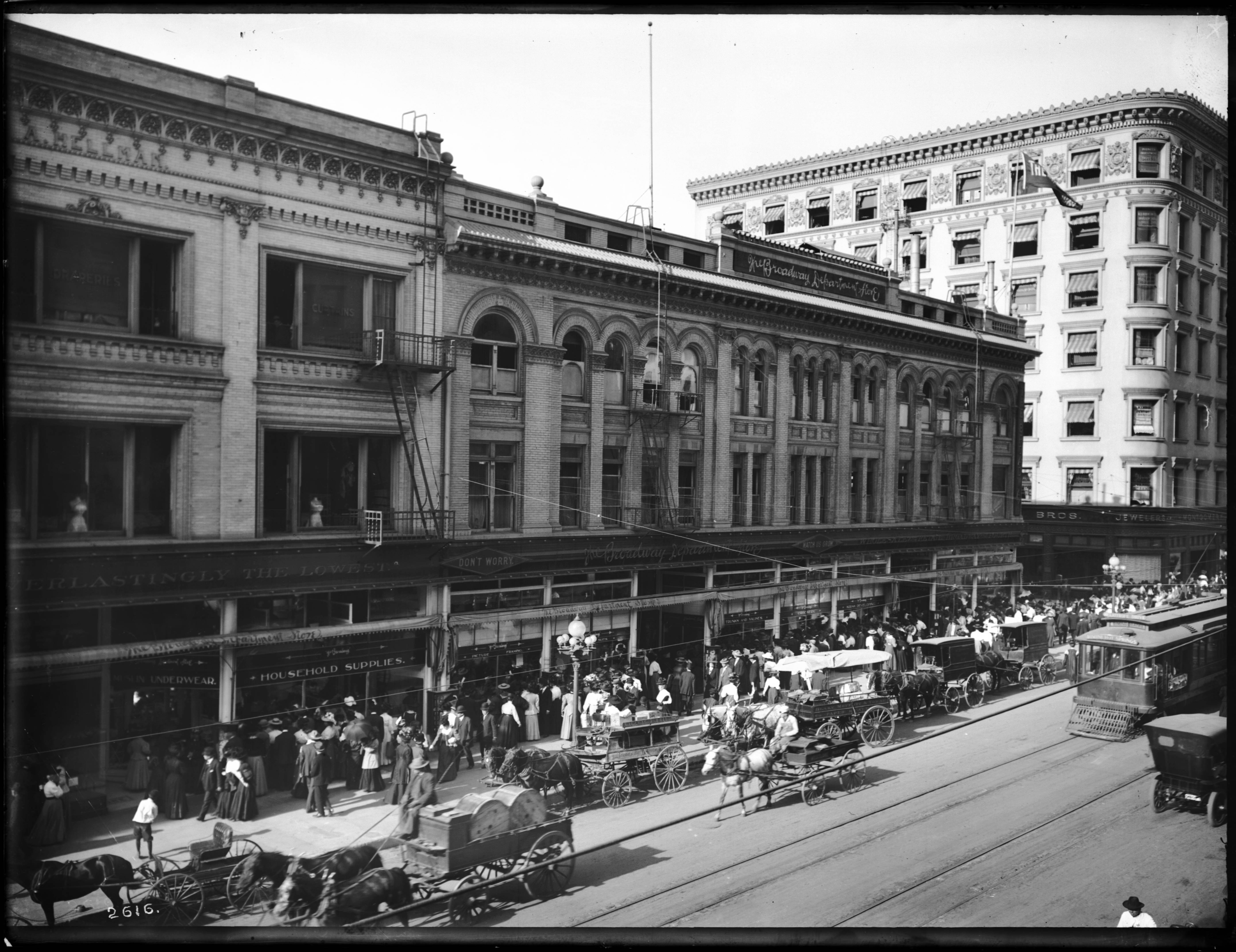
The first location, opened in 1896, 4th and Broadway

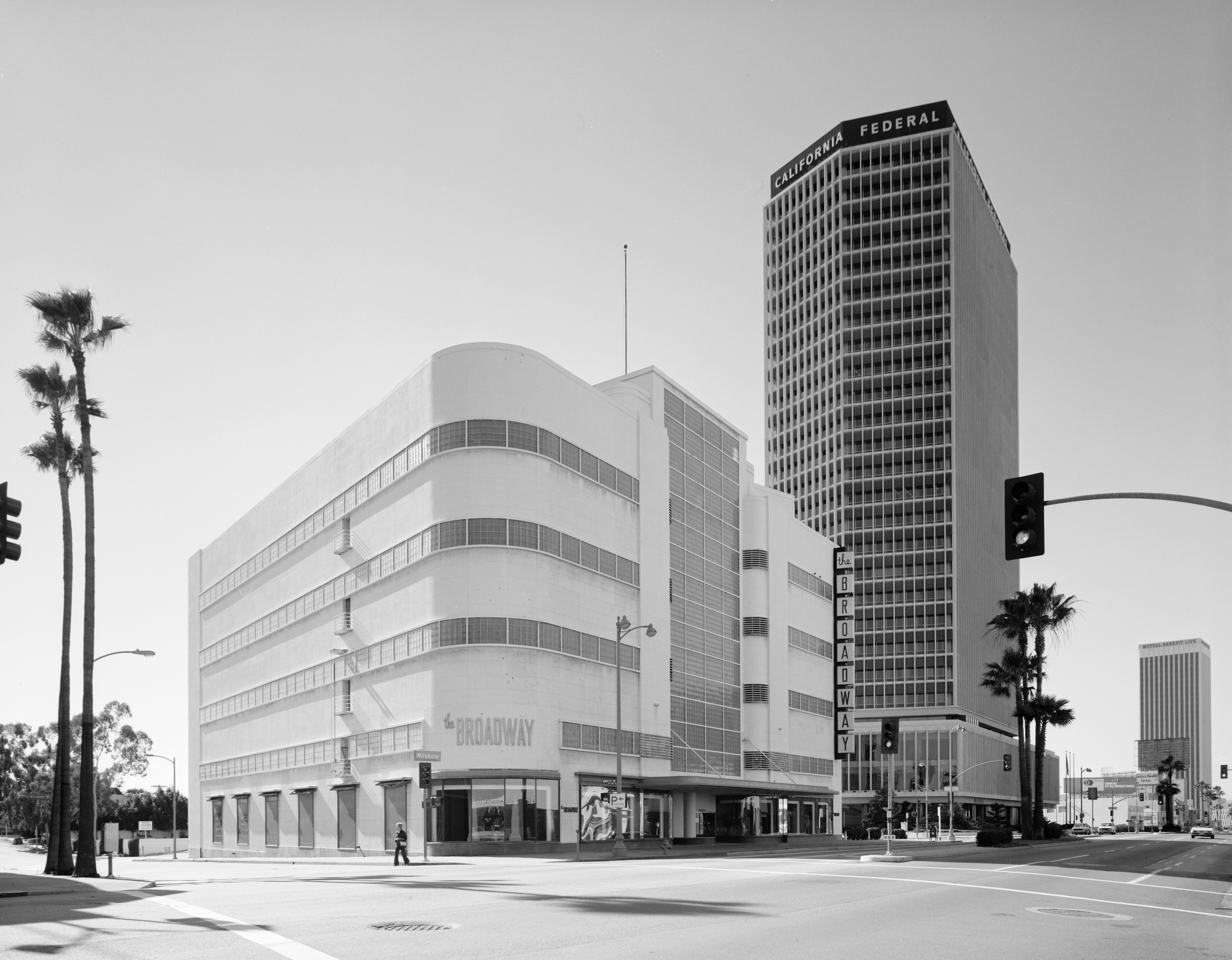
The Broadway Wilshire on Miracle Mile in 1973. The branch was originally a Coulter's department store.

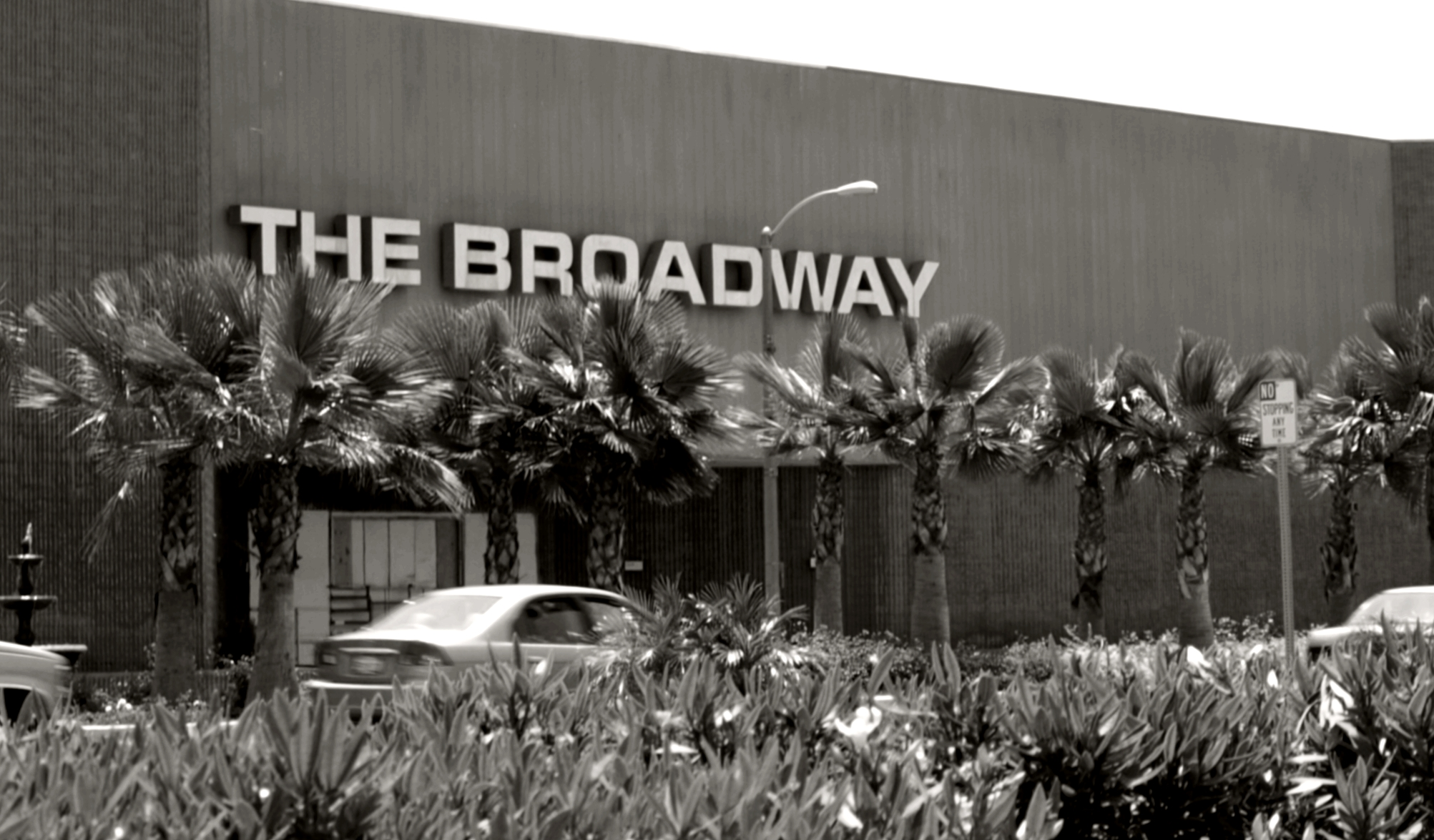
A former Broadway branch at Hawthorne Plaza

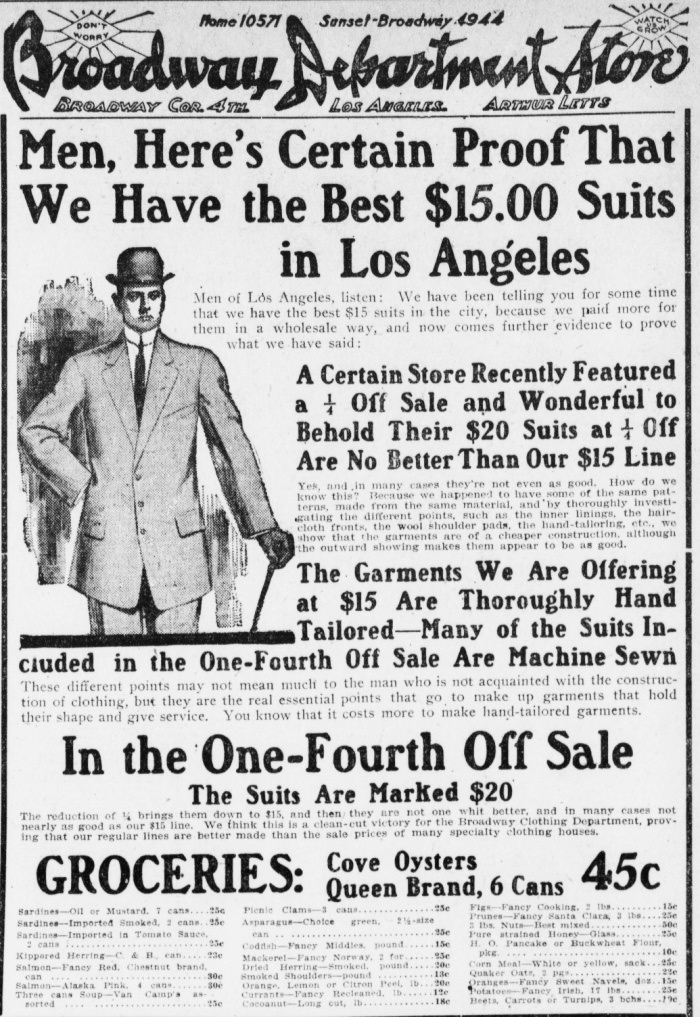
Broadway advertisement in December 1909

== See also ==
- List of department stores converted to Macy's
- List of defunct department stores of the United States
