= Marti's =

Former department store in Long Beach, California

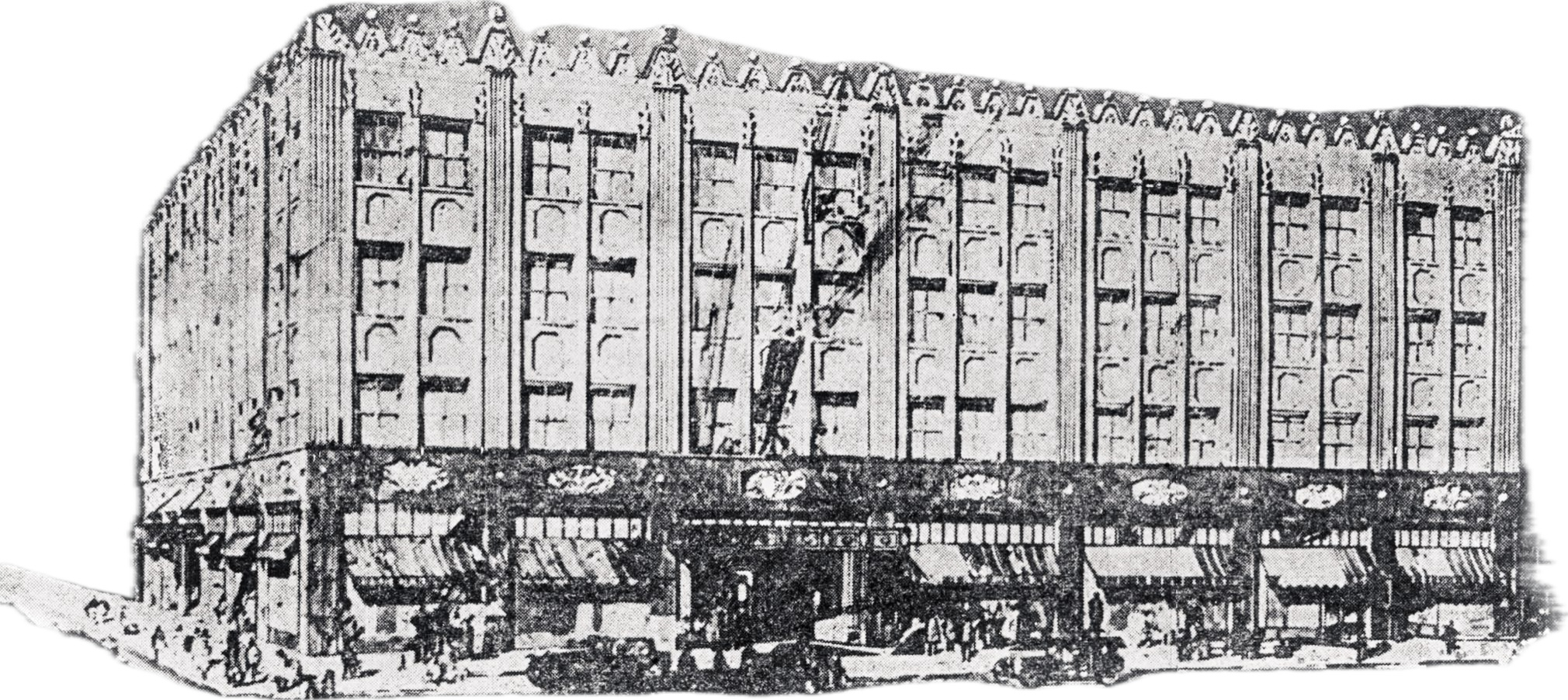
New Marti's store, 1929

Marti's, also known as the Hugh A. Marti Co., was a department store in Long Beach, California, US, opened in February 1923 at 411 Pine Avenue, taking over the Boadway Bros. Long Beach store.

Hugh Albert Marti was the President and General Manager. Marti had worked for Buffums and opened his own department store in 1923. The store expanded over the next five years, one by one taking over leases of adjacent spaces, until by 1928 it had acquired the entire space to build a large new consolidated store.

The new store cost approximately $1,000,000 including the land, covering 22,500 sq ft (2,090 m^{2}) plot, at the northwest corner of Pine and Fourth streets, 4 stories plus a basement. It opened partially in February 1929 and fully on July 25, 1929, with the mayor of Long Beach speaking at the inauguration. It featured a 70-foot-long "fountain" (i.e. soda fountain a long counter with seats serving refreshments and light meals) in the basement. architects Meyer & Holler.

In December 1932, Marti's merged with Long Beach department store The Emporium (not related to The Emporium of San Francisco), as from December 30 operating at the former Emporium store at Broadway and Locust, now branded Marti's, and closing the old location at 4th and Pine. The store held a grand re-opening on January 12, 1933. Marti's in its advertising thanked its customers for their support despite the Great Depression, and in an advertisement profiled its new location: "Marti's New Store will be a Good Store Designed for the Masses without Frills and Fancies…but a Good Store"

Still, due to the effects of the Depression and the 1932 Long Beach earthquake, Martí lost control of the store.

Marti dissolved the Marti Co. in 1934. The building became Walker's Long Beach store. Two years later, he joined the Harris Department Stores in the San Bernardino area, where he had lived previously in Redlands, in the roles of controller, treasurer and member of the board of directors. He retired from Harris in August 1966 but continued to do consulting work for them.

== Hugh A. Marti ==
Hugh Albert Marti was born on 5 February 1889 in Windsor, Missouri. He married Wilfred Rose Foote in 1914 in Redlands, California, and she died in 1940. He remarried in 1943 to Betty Virginia Iaine. Hugh Marti died on 15 November 1967 in Redlands, where he is buried. He was survived by 6 children.
