= Milliron's Westchester =

Defunct California department store

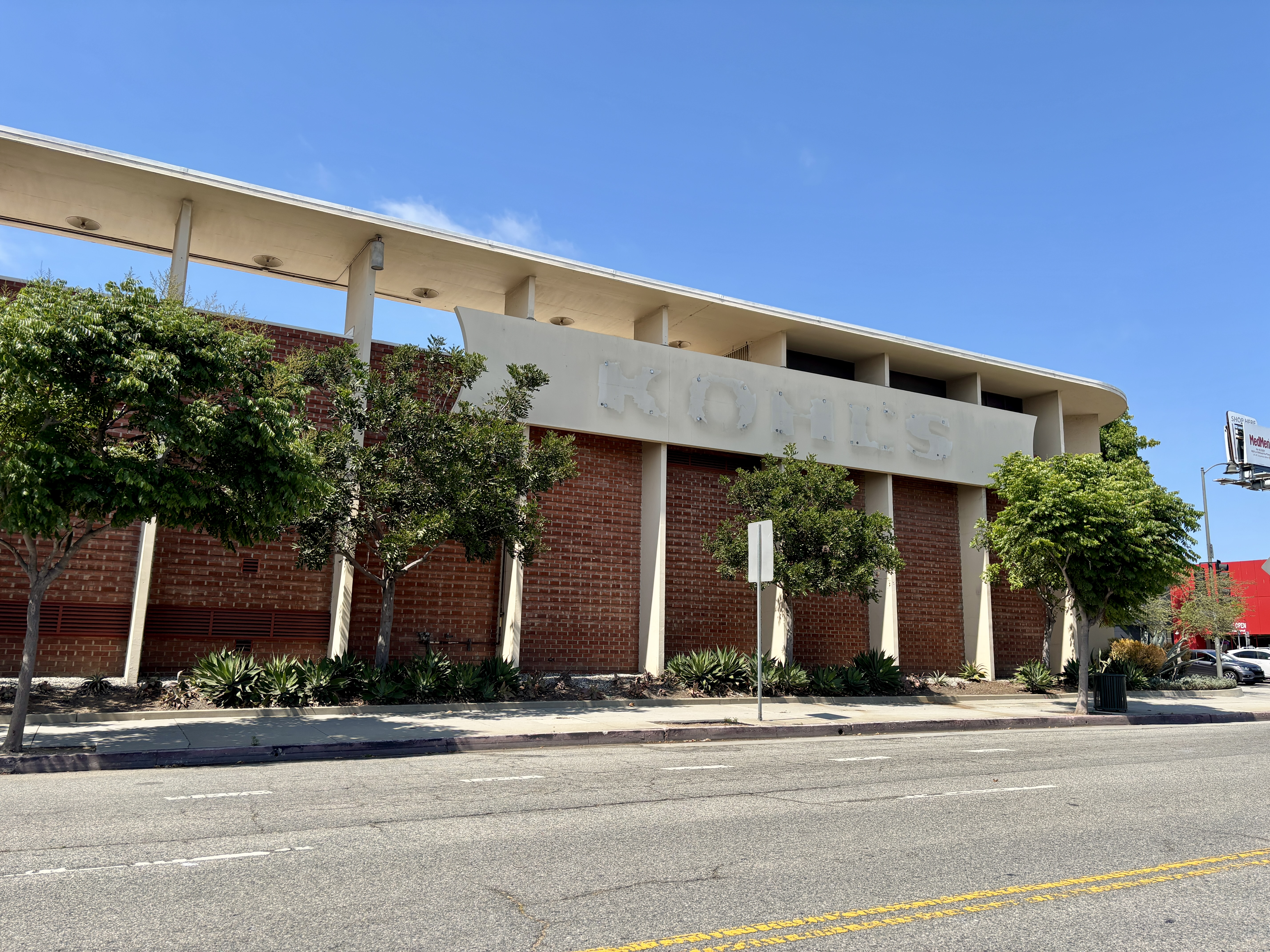

General information
- Architectural style: Late Moderne
- Location: 8739 S. Sepulveda Blvd, Westchester, Los Angeles, California, United States
- Coordinates: 33.95801°N 118.39703°W
- Groundbreaking: May 1948
- Opened: March 17, 1949

Technical details
- Size: 90,000 square feet (8,400 m^{2})
- Floor count: 1

Design and construction
- Architect: Victor Gruen

Other information
- Parking: 300 (rooftop)

Milliron's Westchester, later The Broadway-Westchester, was a department store at 8739 S. Sepulveda Blvd., in Westchester, Los Angeles, designed by architect Victor Gruen. Its original design was considered a landmark in exterior architecture of retail stores, although much of the original design is no longer present. The building was most recently occupied by a Kohl's.

== Background ==
Originally, in 1942, Frank Ayres & Son, developers were commissioned to create a healthy business district along Sepulveda in the new Westchester community. They tried to lure J. C. Penney as an anchor, but Penney's felt the area was too close to Downtown Inglewood. They succeeded in attracting Milliron's, the first branch of Milliron's department store (long known as the Fifth Street Store), which had its flagship store on Broadway in Downtown Los Angeles, then still the city's main retail district lined with large department stores and cinemas. However Milliron's did not have the drawing power of a Bullock's, Broadway or J. W. Robinson's.

== Significance ==
Victor Gruen, an Austrian-born architect, who would later design the country's first enclosed mall, Southdale Center, and greatly influence the design of the American shopping mall, emigrated to the U.S. in 1938 and made a name for himself designing retail stores in New York City, such as Ciro's on Fifth Avenue and Barton's Bonbonniere on Broadway. In 1941 he began extensive work in Los Angeles designing branches of Grayson’s Ladies Ready to Wear on Hollywood Boulevard, Crenshaw Boulevard and Third Street. In 1949 he designed Milliron's Westchester, Westchester was a fast-growing suburban district on the city's Westside.

The grand opening on March 17, 1949 was a "huge event that showcased the elegance and efficiency of postwar Modernism", according to the Los Angeles Conservancy.

Millron's Westchester was considered strikingly innovative when it opened in 1949, in terms of both it attractive Late Moderne design and in being a suburban (but freestanding) department store, which was still relatively new. In the following years, department stores did expand to the Los Angeles suburbs. But only a few years after opening, by the mid-1950s it would be regarded as behind the times:

- the scale as small and relatively ordinary, compared to the larger, complete shopping malls then starting to open, such as Broadway-Crenshaw Center in 1947
- facing the street and attempting to be visually appealing to automobile traffic, when new shopping centers were creating insular environments
- freestanding department stores were already seen as the exception rather than the rule – Architectural Forum declared in 1950 that the "isolated branch store in the suburbs is headed for serious trouble".

Nonetheless, Milliron's was an important reference for Gruen's future career. Because it was a department store and not just a smaller specialty store, his work was exposed at a national level, and Gruen would go on to become the most renowned architect of the American enclosed mall.

== Architectural details ==
Although the building is not listed, the National Register of Historic Places registration form for Bullock's Pasadena references it and describes it as Late Moderne style, "a one-story department store, it also integrated parking lots into the plan, and added roof-top parking accessible via two criss-crossed ramps at the rear of the building. Faced with unpainted brick, its facade displays regular bays marked by structural fins creating a flat-canopied loggia above the roofline. This system circumscribes the building, sweeping down to form a modernistic arch over the rear entries to the rooftop parking ramps. Though it was windowless, Milliron's provided four freestanding display kiosks for window displays along the sidewalk side."

=== Height ===
Milliron's design aimed to house "five stories' worth of department store within one story", despite the store being only 90,000 square feet (8,400 m^{2}) in size. The restaurant, beauty parlor and auditorium were located on the roof and elevated the main façade to a height of 30 feet. An elevation wrapped around the secondary façade and screened a rooftop parking deck and stair towers from view at ground level and vertical concrete fins accentuated the apparent height, which from all main angles appeared to be that of a two-story building.

=== Parking ===
An unusual feature was a rooftop parking lot for 300 cars. Dramatic ramps that were designed with straight lines but with some slightly diagonal lines, and with curves at the angles, led cars up to the roof. Escalators led down into the store from the roof.

== Epilogue ==
The shopping district around Milliron's area remained sparse for the first few years. The store was sold in June 1950 to The Broadway was then known as The Broadway-Westchester. Westchester never did take off as a regional shopping nexus, especially after the construction of the nearby Fox Hills Mall.

Broadway closed its Westchester branch in late 1990. The building later housed a branch of Mervyn's and a branch of Kohl's. As of January 2026, the building is unoccupied.
