= Korricks =

Former department store in Phoenix, Arizona

Korricks (in its earlier advertisements, Korricks' with final apostrophe (plural possessive) or "Chas. Korrick & Bro.") was a department store in Downtown Phoenix at 1 N. 1st St. at Washington, which later would be a branch of Los Angeles-based The Broadway.

The brothers Samuel, Charles and Abraham Korrick were all born in Grodno in the Russian Empire, now in Belarus. Samuel Korrick (b. 1870) arrived in Phoenix in 1895 and opened a 25 foot side dry goods store which he called the New York Store. Over time it expanded to the upper floor of the building and took over neighboring storefronts. In 1900 brother Charles Korrick (b. 1888) arrived in Phoenix to work together on the store. In 1903 Samuel Korrick died; Charles was only 17. In 1905 brother Abraham Korrick (b. 1882) arrived in Phoenix to help.

In 1914 they opened a much larger store, designed by Trost & Trost in 1912–13, and opened in 1914. It later opened a branch at Chris-Town Mall. In 1962 it was acquired by The Broadway and the two stores were renamed The Broadway.
