= Hawthorne Plaza =

Defunct mall in Hawthorne, California

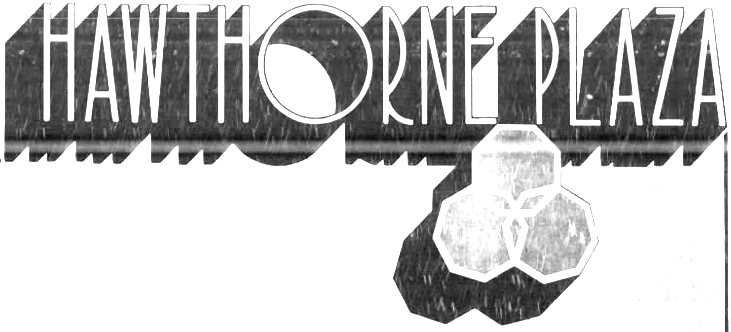

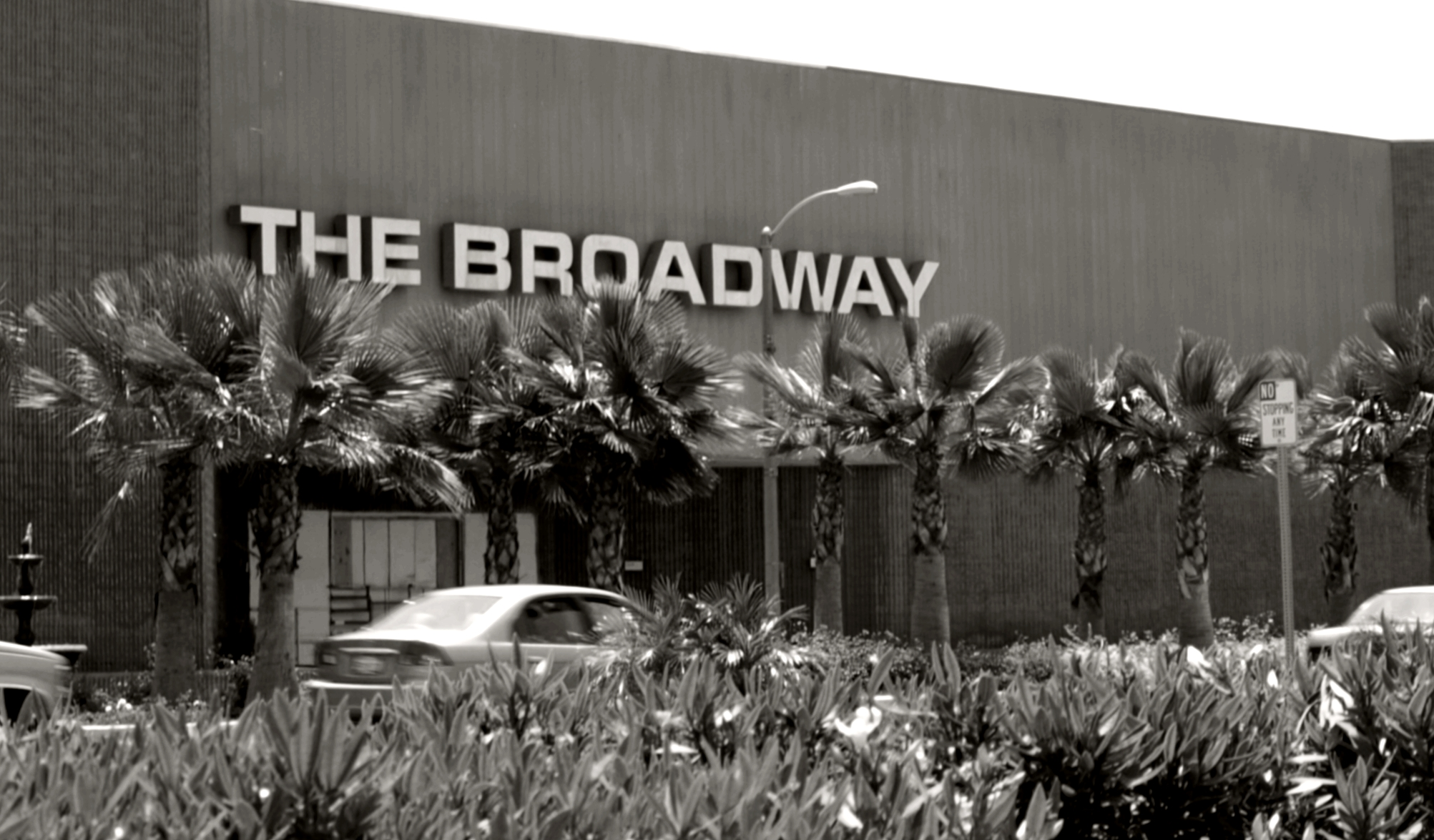
- The mall's former The Broadway department store as seen from Hawthorne Boulevard (c. mid-2000s)
- Location: Hawthorne, California, U.S.
- Coordinates: 33.92128°N 118.35144°W
- Address: 12000 Hawthorne Boulevard (formerly 12124 Hawthorne Plaza)
- Opened: February 21, 1977; 49 years ago
- Closed: March 1, 1999; 27 years ago
- Developer: Ernest W. Hahn Inc., Carter Hawley Hale Properties Inc., Urban Projects Inc.
- Owner: Cushman & Wakefield
- Architect: Charles Kober Associates
- Num. of stores: 134 (1977)
- Num. of anchor tenants: 3 (all vacant)
- Floor area: 801,000 ft^{2} (74,400 m^{2}); The Broadway 159,100 ft^{2} (14,780 m^{2}); Montgomery Ward 158,500 ft^{2} (14,730 m^{2}); J. C. Penney 168,000 ft^{2} (15,600 m^{2})
- Floors: 2
- Parking: 3,599

Hawthorne Plaza was an enclosed shopping mall along Hawthorne Boulevard between 120th Street and El Segundo Boulevard in Hawthorne, California. Since closing in 1999, the structure was frequently used to film scenes for television, music video, and film productions.

== History ==
=== Opening ===
Hawthorne Plaza was part of the Hawthorne Plaza Redevelopment Project, approved in 1969, which called for the redevelopment of a 35-acre (14 ha) plot of land. Ground was broken for the mall in January 1974 and most of the mall's 134 stores opened in February 1977. It included an indoor mall with three anchor stores — Montgomery Ward, The Broadway, and J.C. Penney and freestanding stores at the property's south end. The mall largely catered to the middle-class residents living in and around Hawthorne, and featured cheaper stores than other nearby malls such as South Bay Galleria, Manhattan Village and the Del Amo Fashion Center.

=== Decline ===
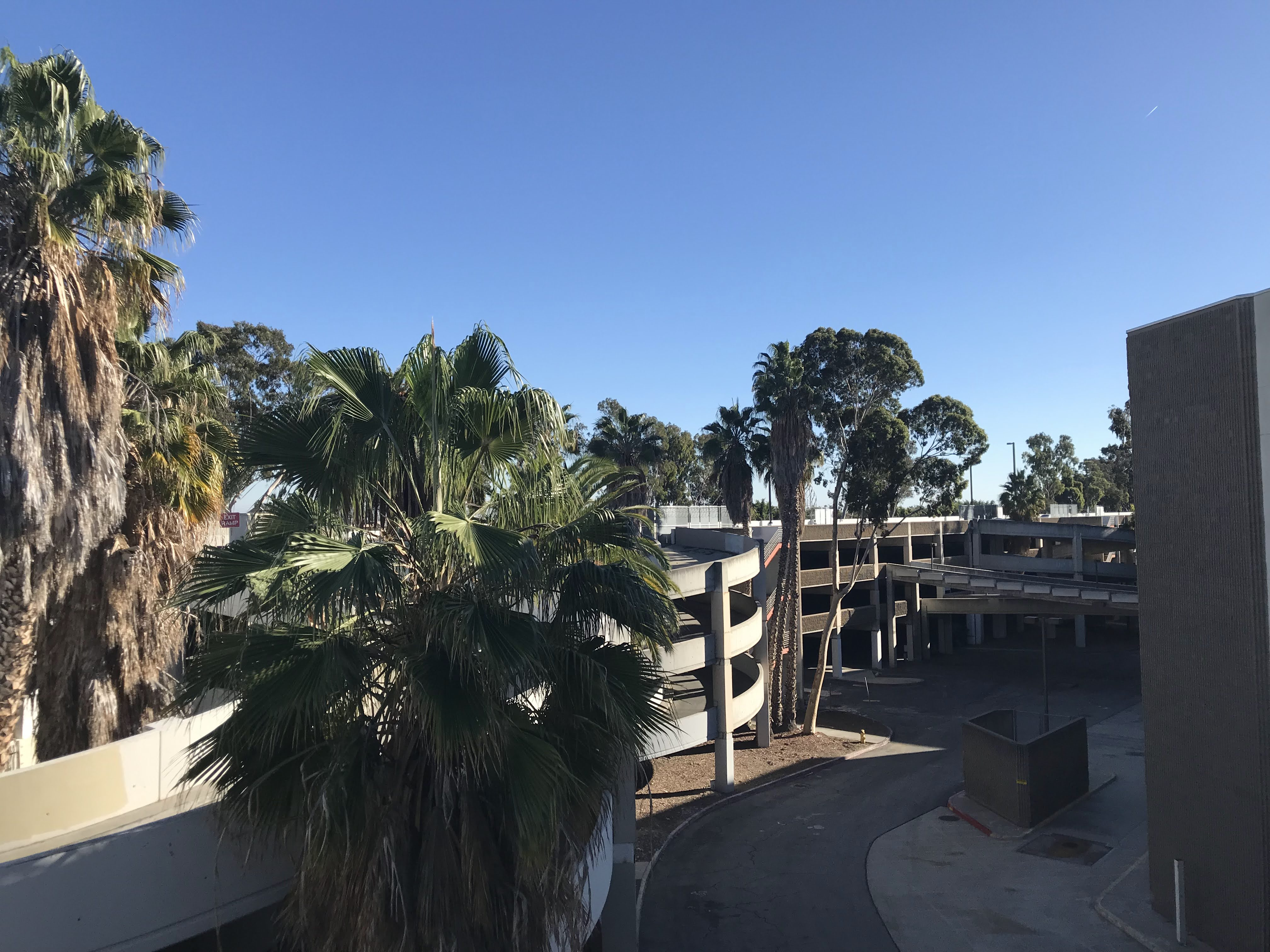
parking structure and former Broadway entrance c.2022

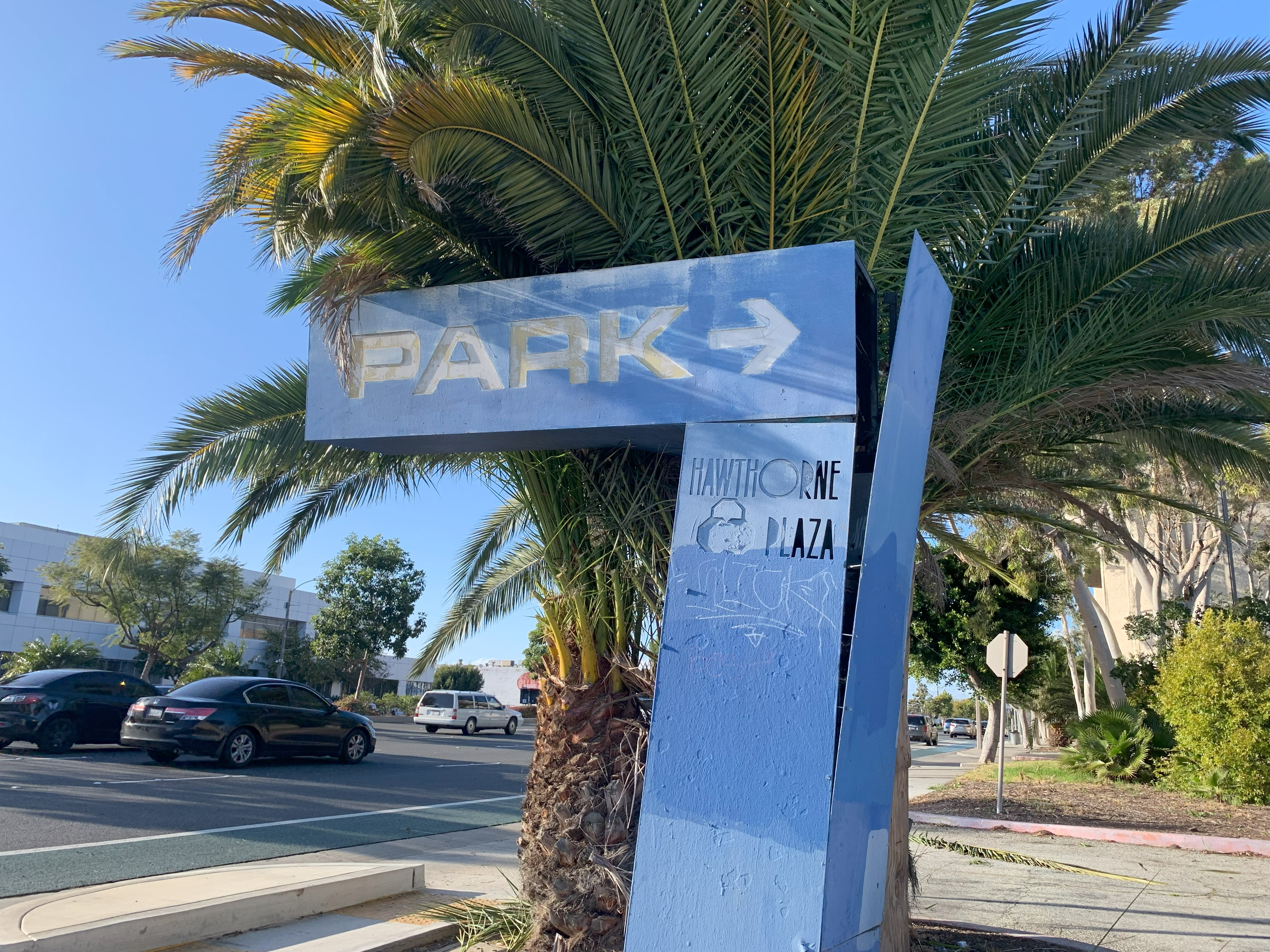
The former sign at the parking structure entrance c.2024

Despite initial popularity, the mall's early years were marred by two shootings in 1979. The mall went further into decline in the 1980s and 1990s, due in part to the economic decline of the area after the cutbacks in aerospace jobs, white flight, and to competition from other shopping centers.

A pedestrian bridge connected to the mall's parking structure was heavily damaged in the 1987 Whittier Narrows earthquake; it was not repaired and closed permanently to customer traffic in 1988. The bridge later collapsed completely during the 1994 Northridge earthquake.

In 1992, the mall was heavily looted and damaged during the 1992 Los Angeles riots, but sales stayed consistent following the unrest briefly until the end of the decade.

The mall's number of occupied stores declined from 130 in the late 1980s to 87 in 1994 and around 70 in 1998. After the Macy's Clearance Center (which replaced The Broadway upon the latter's purchase by Federated Department Stores) closed in December 1997, plans were announced to put in an AMC Theatre on the site and convert the mall into an open-air shopping center, but the renovations failed to materialize. The mall's final anchor, JCPenney, closed in 1998 and the mall itself closed in 1999.

The southern section of the mall across from the parking structure was demolished in 1998 and rebuilt as a strip mall. It currently includes a supermarket, a pharmacy, and some small restaurants.

=== Potential redevelopment plans ===
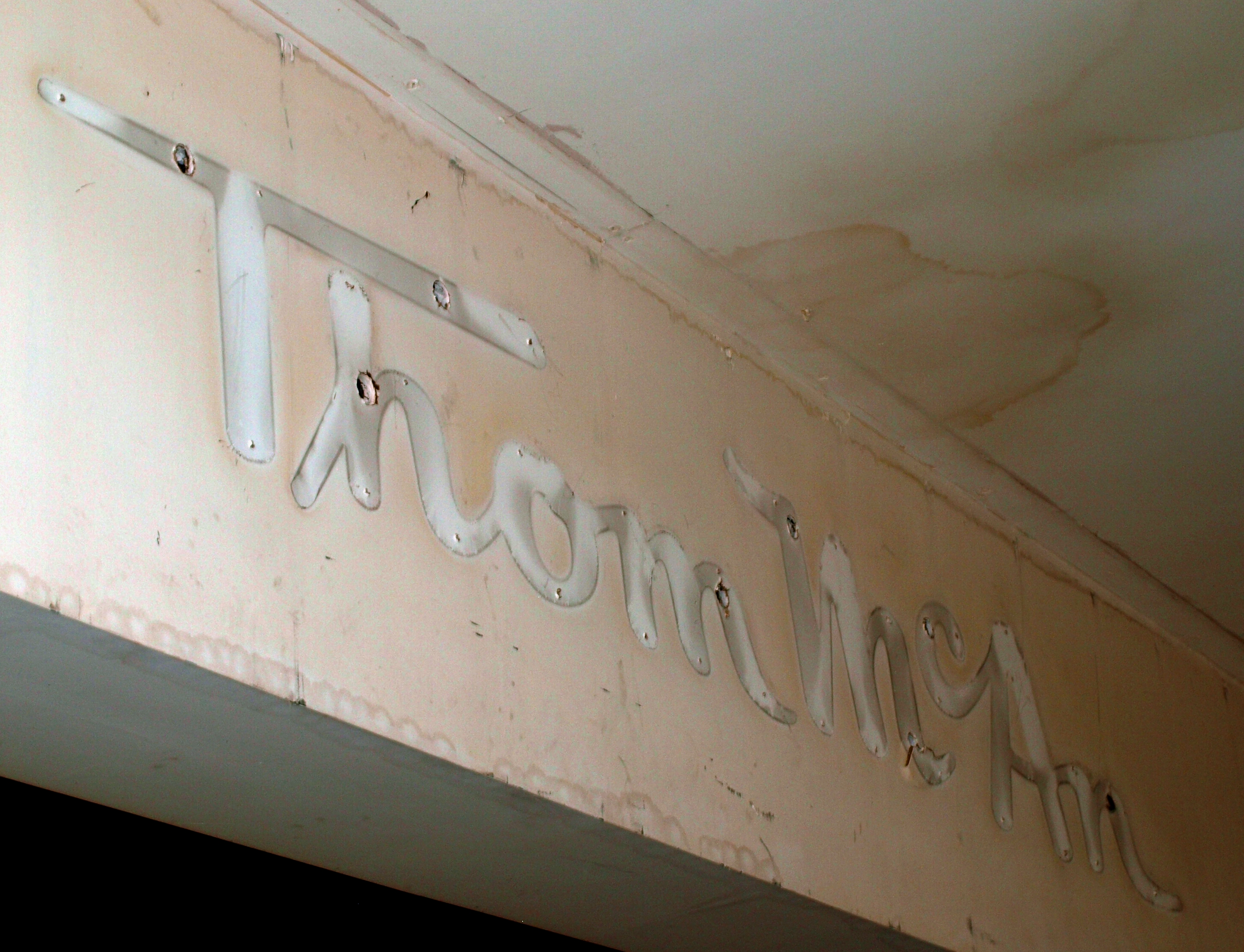
Vestiges of the mall's past—the scar of a former Thom McAn shop

Numerous redevelopment plans for the abandoned mall have been proposed, plans to redevelop the mall started since 1998, however, none of the proposals have come to fruition.

On November 21, 2014, ABC News announced that Hawthorne Plaza would be revitalized as an outlet mall.

In February 2016, it was announced that Hawthorne Plaza would be revitalized as a large "power center", which could include an outdoor mini-mall, an office complex and walkable outdoor retail strips with upper-level homes.

A month later, on March 10, 2016, the Hawthorne Specific Plan, which included the revitalization of the ailing mall, was approved by the city council. The plan also called for 500 high-end housing units, innovative office units, commercial outlets open to Hawthorne Blvd, and outdoor dining sites. Property owner Charles Co. never began construction.

On November 29, 2016, the Hawthorne City Hall commission announced plans to demolish Hawthorne Plaza and build something similar to the Farmers Market in Los Angeles. As of 2021 the future developments have been put on an indefinite hold.

On December 15, 2022, mall owner Arman Gabaee was sentenced to four years in prison for bribing a Los Angeles County official in a scheme to sign a lucrative tenancy agreement for the abandoned mall.

In October of 2023, Cushman & Wakefield acquired the mall property and placed it for sale for redevelopment opportunities. The initial plan during the acquisition was to turn the mall into residential apartments.

=== Further uses ===
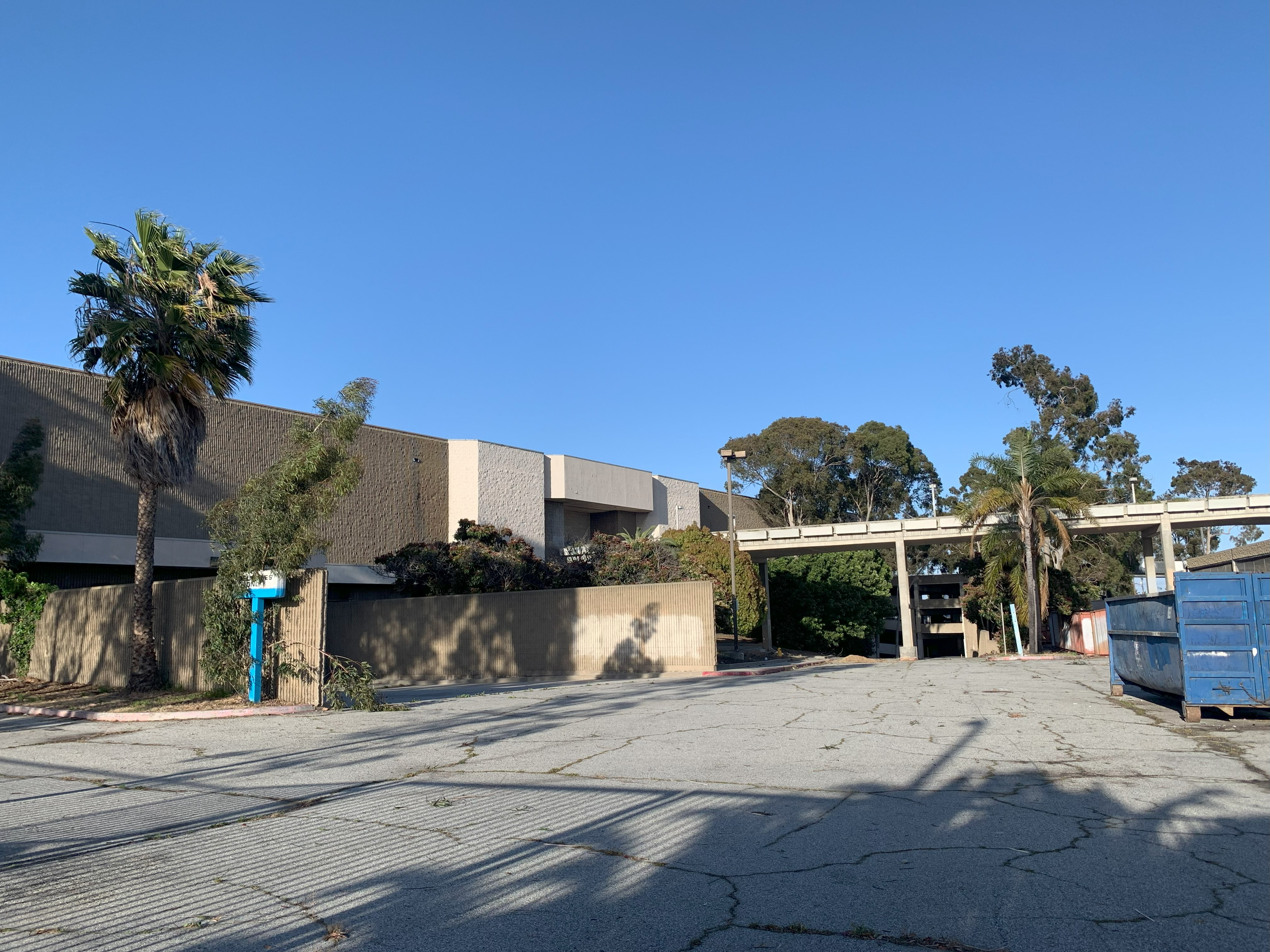
The Southern loading dock of the mall as of March 2024

The mall building and most of its multistory parking lots are now abandoned except for a police training center that was built in the portion formerly occupied by Montgomery Ward. Most of the interior was gutted between 2010 and 2011.

On the northern side is an annex administrative office for the Hawthorne School District. The southern parking structure and adjacent parking lot connected to the mall are being used to store Tesla vehicles.

On January 26, 2022, the mall was heavily damaged by arson in connection to a makeshift homeless encampment. The entrance to the former Broadway building and the central entrance were both severely damaged following the fire.

In 2025, the city of Hawthorne obtained a court injunction requiring the owner to either redevelop or demolish the mall by August 2026. Demolition began in August 2026. The demolition will be done in phases, going from south to north. Demolition is expected to be complete by August 31, 2026.

== As a filming location ==
The abandoned mall has also been used to film numerous movies, TV shows, and music videos such as Evolution (2001), Minority Report (2002), The Green Hornet (2006), The Fast and the Furious: Tokyo Drift (2006), Teen Wolf (2011), Agents of S.H.I.E.L.D. (2013), Beyoncé's "Superpower" (2013), Gone Girl (2014), Lindsey Stirling's "Heist" (2014), David Guetta's "Bang My Head" (2014), Rush Hour (2016), Colony (2016), Westworld (2016), Taylor Swift's "...Ready for It?" (2017), Chris Brown's "Party" (2017), Travis Scott's Astroworld trailer (2018), Drake's "Nice For What" (2018), and Tenet (2020).

== See also ==
- Robert F. Kennedy Medical Center
- Westside Pavilion
- Carousel Mall
