= Christown Spectrum Mall =

Christown Spectrum
- Location: Phoenix, Arizona
- Coordinates: 33.522149°N 112.095351°W
- Address: 1703 West Bethany Home Road
- Opened: August 24, 1961
- Previous names: Chris-Town Mall (1961–2001); Phoenix Spectrum Mall (2001–2006)
- Developer: Del E Webb Corporation
- Manager: Vestar Development Co.
- Architect: Welton Becket & Associates, Friedman & Jobusch
- Num. of stores: 50+
- Num. of anchor tenants: 11 (including outparcels and junior anchors)
- Floors: 1 + mezzanine
- Website: christownspectrum.com

Christown Spectrum is a shopping mall in Phoenix, Arizona, United States, located at 1703 W. Bethany Home Road. It is the city's oldest operating mall and was the third shopping mall built in the city. Its name is derived from Chris-Town Mall and Phoenix Spectrum Mall, previous names. The mall opened in 1961 as an enclosed shopping mall, but the enclosed portion of the mall was greatly reduced when redevelopment changed the configuration closer to a power center.

Christown Spectrum's anchor stores are SuperTarget, Walmart Supercenter, and American Furniture Warehouse. Christown Spectrum also features Big 5 Sporting Goods, Burlington, Dollar Tree, Hobby Lobby, PetSmart, Ross Dress for Less, Walgreens and a Harkins Theatres with 14 screens serving as junior anchors.

== History ==
=== Chris-Town Mall ===
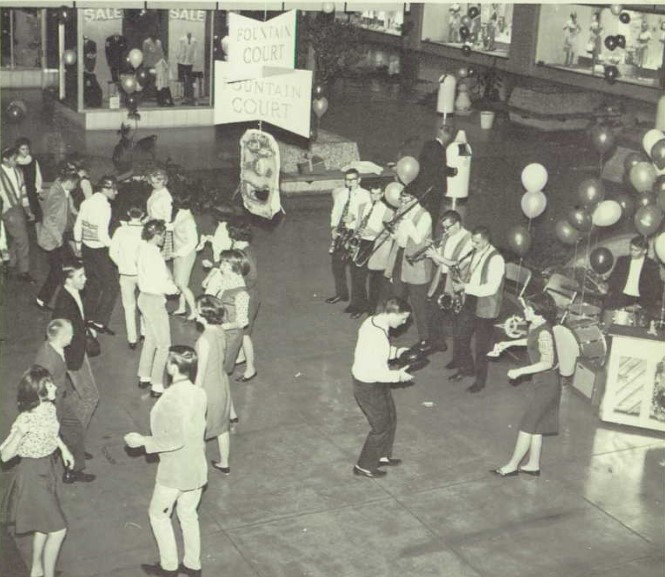
School dance in Christown Mall Fountain Court 1964

Chris-Town Mall was originally named after the farmer, Chris Harri, who sold a large portion of his farmland to the mall's developer, Del Webb, in the late 1950s.

The mall was designed by Los Angeles architect Welton Becket & Associates and Tucson architects Friedman & Jobusch. Del Webb's construction company was contractor. Construction was completed in mid-1961 and Chris-Town Mall opened on August 24. It was the first indoor mall in Arizona, with an air-conditioned interior. The mall's original anchors included Montgomery Ward, JCPenney, and the first branch of the Downtown Phoenix department store Korricks. Other major tenants included S. S. Kresge, & Woolworth. Themed Courtyards served as focal points in front of each of the three major department stores. The main courtyard at the center entrance that buffered JCPenney was named the Court of Fountains; the Court of Flowers ended the east wing near Korrick's, and the Montgomery Ward opened to the Court of Birds, in the west wing.

In 1966, Korricks was bought by and renamed The Broadway. Also that year the mall's first of two movie theatres broke ground on the southwest side of the main parking lot. And a new subterranean tavern, called The Janitor's Closet, opened in the mall in front of The Broadway, down a winding set of stairs in the basement at the northeast end of the mall.

In 1973 construction began on a new wing on the southwestern side of the mall opened to a United Artists Cinemas 6 on the upper level, making it Chris-Town's second movie theatre. The new southeastern wing was designed by Friedman & Jobusch and built by Homes & Son Construction Company. Woolworth's was later demolished to make way for the new southwestern wing anchored by a Bullock's department store. Ladd Kelsey & Woodard of Los Angeles were architects and C. L. Peck was contractor. Interiors of the Bullock's were designed by Walker/Grad, Inc. of New York. The new store opened in November 1977.

In the mid-1980s, Diamond's, which quickly became Dillard's, moved into the southwestern anchor spot vacated by Bullock's short stay at the mall.

The next decade saw the rapid closure of many anchor stores beginning with The Broadway in 1994; JCPenney, store #1821, in 1997; the bankrupt Montgomery Ward in 2001; and smaller anchors Butler Shoe Store and Woolworths. The final anchor, Dillard's, closed in 2004. The mall also closed the life sized sand sculptures exhibit that adorned the mall for many years.

=== Phoenix Spectrum Mall ===
In November 2001, the mall was renamed Phoenix Spectrum Mall, and Grossman Company Properties began a $10 million renovation project. The mall changed its focus to discount stores, starting with the demolition of The Broadway and replacement by Walmart (originally built as a discount store, later expanded into a Supercenter) in 1994. The mall also opened the first Costco to be located in an enclosed mall which replaced the old JCPenney building. This was followed by the division of the Wards department store into a PetSmart and Ross Dress for Less. Walgreens, a longtime resident inside the mall, relocated outside the mall, with Big 5 Sporting Goods replacing that location in the mall.

=== Christown Spectrum ===
Following the sale of the mall to Developers Diversified Realty in 2006, Phoenix Spectrum Mall took on a hybrid of its previous names to become known as Christown Spectrum Mall.

Around this time, the southwestern wing was demolished and replaced by Target and space for smaller shops not directly connected to the mall. The former United Artists Cinemas and food court were demolished and replaced by a Harkins Theatre with stadium seating which resulted in the Chris-Town Cinemas located in the parking lot to also be demolished. Most of the enclosed section between the old Court of Fountains and the new PetSmart and Costco was demolished for the return of JCPenney, which relocated from nearby Metrocenter. This demolition cut off mall access to the PetSmart and Ross, thus leaving only the center and eastern side as traditional enclosed mall.

In December 2015, Kimco Realty acquired the mall for $115.3 million or $136 per square foot. At that time, the property was 94% occupied.

Today the only remaining original structures are the center entrance, east wing and the Montgomery Ward building, although the second floor remains non-leasable space. The rest of the buildings that housed the original anchors have been razed, along with the movie theater and the entire western wing. Although the mall's central complex remains, the fountains were removed shortly after new flooring was added.

On February 11, 2020, it was announced that Costco would be closing. Despite an online petition to keep the store from closing, which received over six thousand signatures, the store officially closed on September 20, 2020. American Furniture Warehouse opened in the former Costco space on August 1, 2022.

On June 4, 2020, it was announced that JCPenney would also be closing as part of a plan to close 154 stores nationwide. The store closed October 18, 2020. Burlington and Hobby Lobby opened in the former JCPenney space in 2024.

=== Anchor history ===
- Montgomery Ward opened August 24, 1961, closed in 2001 with the space split to house PetSmart and Ross Dress for Less.
- JCPenney opened August 24, 1961, closed in 1997 demolished and replaced with Costco in 2001 which closed September 20, 2020. American Furniture Warehouse opened in the former Costco building on August 1, 2022
- Korrick's opened August 24, 1961, became The Broadway in 1966, closed and demolished in 1993. Walmart opened on the site in 1994.
- United Artists Cinema 6 opened in 1974 as an expansion to the mall. Demolished and replaced with a Harkins Theatre in 2007.
- Bullock's opened in November 1977 as an expansion to the mall. Became Diamond's which was quickly converted to Dillard's in the mid 1980s. Dillard's closed in 2004 and was demolished and replaced with a Super Target in 2007.
- JCPenney returned to the mall around 2006 building a new store in the former west wing of the mall. Closed October 8, 2020. Now occupied by Burlington and Hobby Lobby.

== Light rail ==
Christown Spectrum Mall is served by Montebello/19th Avenue station on the B Line of the Valley Metro Rail & Streetcar system.

== See also ==
- Arrowhead Towne Center
- Park Central Mall
- Maryvale Mall
- Desert Sky Mall
- Encanto, Phoenix City of Phoenix, Arizona Urban Villages Map
- Mesa Riverview
- Tempe Marketplace
- Superstition Springs Center
- Fiesta Mall
- Tri City Mall
- Los Arcos Mall
- Metrocenter (Phoenix, Arizona)
- Paradise Valley Mall
