= Fifth Street Store =

Former department store in Los Angeles, United States

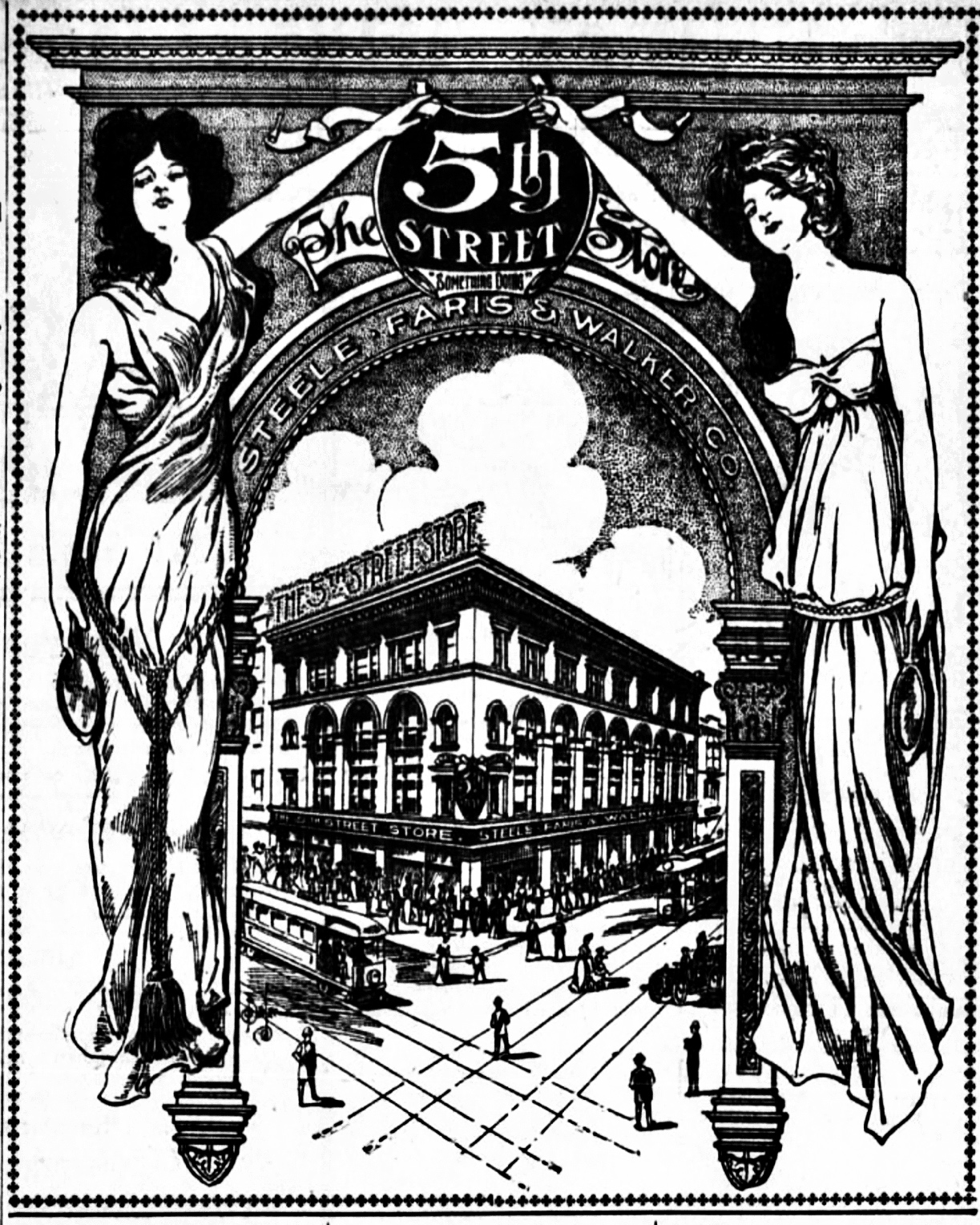
- Illustration from 1905 article in the Los Angeles Herald announcing the opening of the "Fifth Street Store"
- Company type: Privately-held company
- Industry: Clothing
- Founded: 1905; 120 years ago in Los Angeles, USA
- Defunct: 1978
- Fate: Locations merged into Ohrbach's, Milliron's Westchester, or Walker Scott
- Area served: California, USA

The Fifth Street Store was a major department store in Los Angeles opened in 1905.

== Name ==
The official name of the company and store changed many times:

- 1905–1909: Steele, Faris, & Walker Co. - the official company name and name under which the store was promoted.
- 1909–1925: Muse, Faris, Walker Co. / The Fifth Street Store: the former being the official company name but it promoted itself simply as the "Fifth Street Store", with the official name in smaller text.
- 1926–1946: Walker's: In 1925, the company name changed to Walkers, Inc and from mid-1926 the store started advertising as Walker's, Broadway at 5th.
- 1946–1953 Milliron's, after C. J. Milliron, the president and controlling stockholder at that time. Milliron joined the stores as an attorney in 1917, and became president in September 1943. He purchased the store from William A. Faris. Continued as Milliron's even after purchased by The Broadway in 1950.
- 1953–1959: the store was a branch of Ohrbach's, opened November 30, 1953, promoted as Ohrbach's-Downtown

== Locations ==
=== Broadway, Los Angeles ===
This store was located at the southwest corner of Fifth and Broadway. The company replaced a previous building with a new eleven-story store completed in 1924. From 1925 the store began to advertise as Walkers — co-founder Ralf (R. M.) Walker would later found what would be San Diego's largest department store chain, Walker Scott. In 1946 it changed its name to Milliron's. The Broadway Department Store purchased the store in 1950 and closed it in 1956, when Ohrbach's bought it in August 1953. The store underwent a $1,000,000 remodel by Welton Becket, architect, and reopened in November 1953 as Ohrbach's-Downtown. Ohrbach's closed its branch and sold the building in 1959.

=== Westchester ===
Milliron's Westchester opened on March 17, 1949, designed by prominent retail architect Victor Gruen and cost $3,000,000 to build. The grand opening was a large event and the architecture - with its straight lines combined with large curves at the angles; its triangular window displays jutting out from the store; and the deck to its rooftop parking deck – was considered a landmark in retail architecture. The store was sold shortly afterwards, in June 1950, to The Broadway.

=== Walker's Long Beach ===
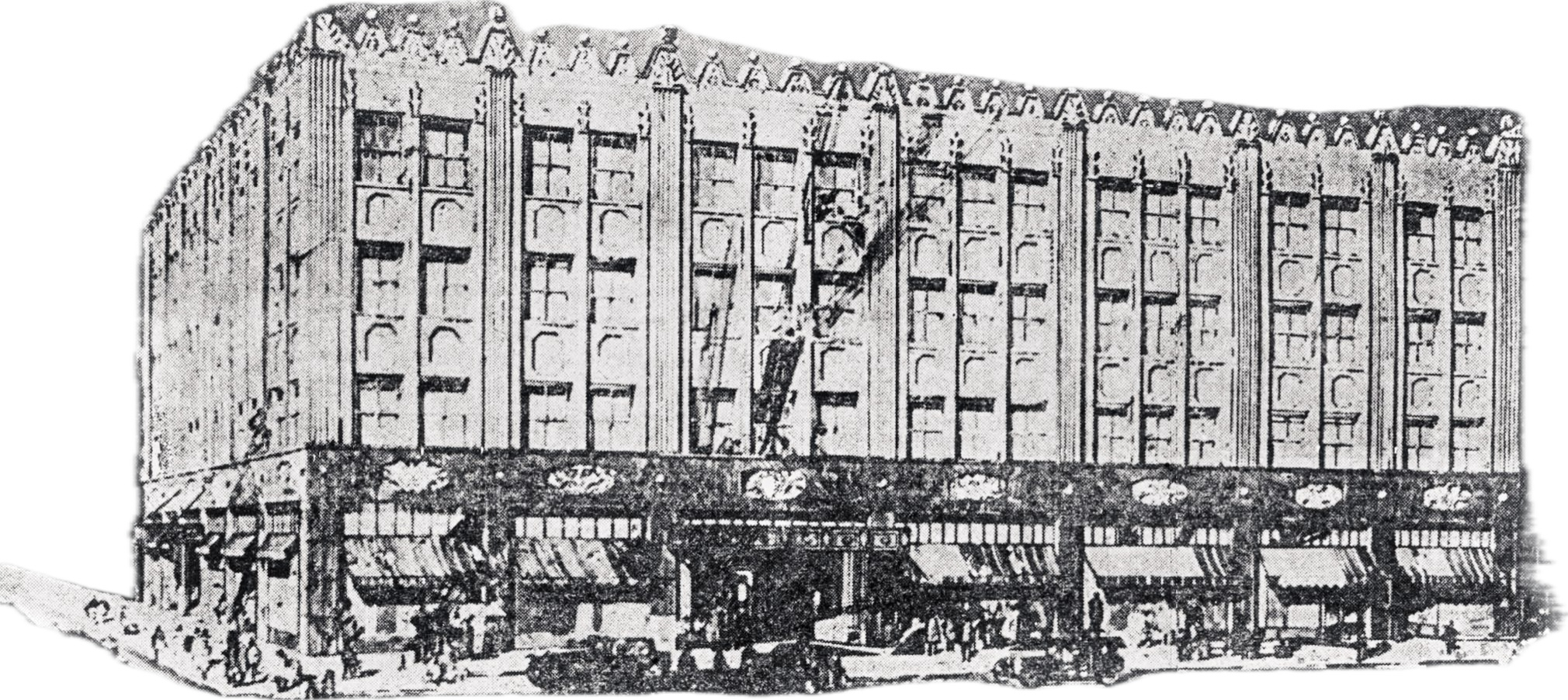
Hugh A. Marti Co. before acquisition by the Fifth Street Store

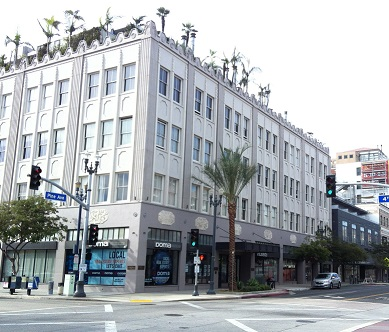
Former Walker's Downtown Long Beach store

Walker's opened their first branch store in Downtown Long Beach at 4th and Pine - Pine being the main shopping artery - in 1933. The building had been opened in 1928, designed by Meyer and Holler in art deco style for the Hugh A. Marti Co., which had gone out of business. In 1952, they spent $300,000 to expand to 132,000 sq ft (12,300 m^{2}), adding 5 escalators, more than the total number of escalators in Long Beach at the time. Walker's Long Beach opened a second Long Beach store at Los Altos Center in 1954 which it sold to The Broadway shortly thereafter in 1956. Walker's sold its Downtown Long Beach store in 1960, but it continued to operate as Walker's until 1978.

=== Walker-Scott San Diego ===
Walker's opened a branch store in downtown San Diego in 1935, which separated in the early 1950s and became Walker Scott.
