= The Emporium (Long Beach) =

Defunct department store in Long Beach, California

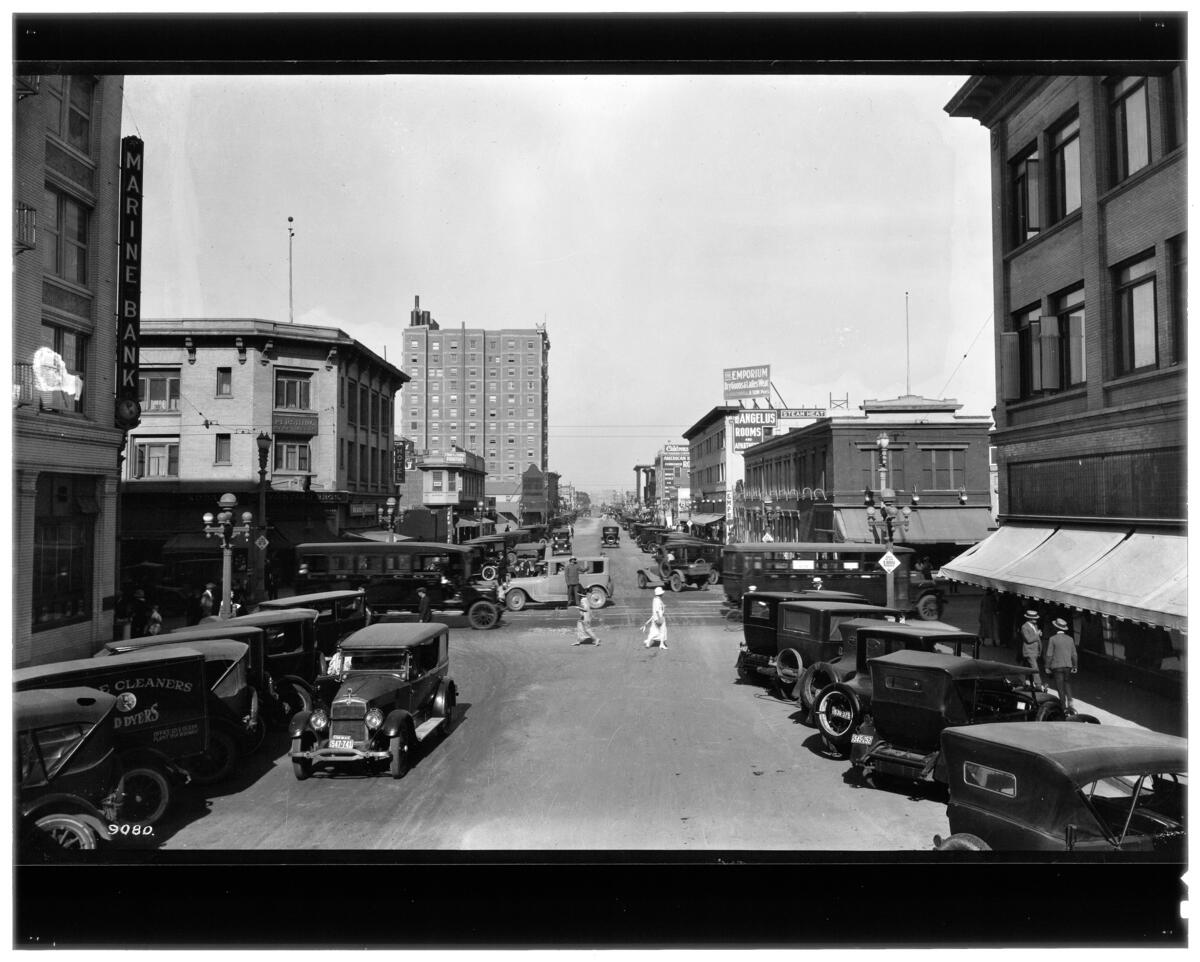
View of Pine Street at Broadway in Long Beach, ca. 1925. The Emporium is visible slightly to the right of the center of the photo, with a billboard on its roof.

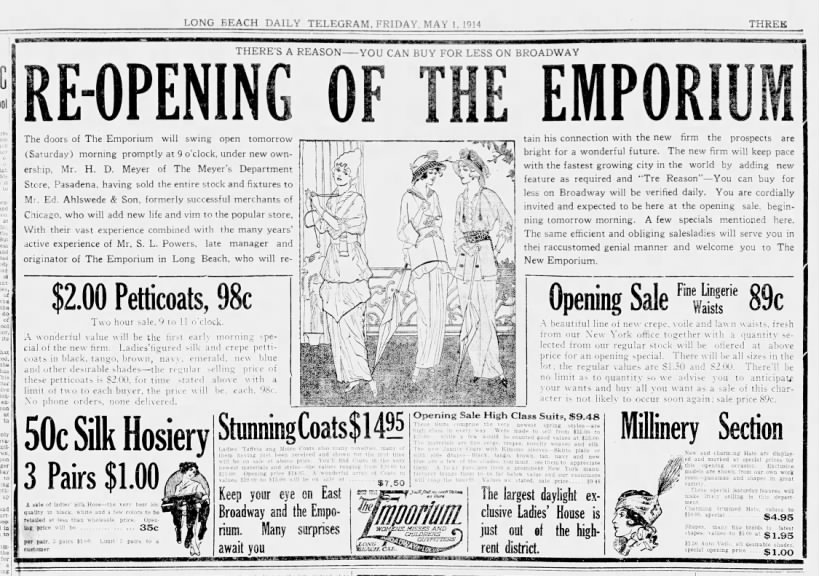
Ad for the reopening of The Emporium under Ahlswede ownership on May 2, 1914

The Emporium was a department store in Downtown Long Beach, California.

== Great Cash Bargain Store 1904–1905 at 332 Pine ==
The Emporium's origins go back to Harry Brown and Stephen L. Powers, whose company S. L. Powers & Co. opened The Great Cash Bargain Store on July 28, 1904, at 32 Pine Street (later 332 Pine) in the then-new W. H. Martin Building.

== 1st Emporium 1904–1907, 332 Pine ==
On March 30, 1905, Powers changed the store name to The Emporium. In January 1907, this first "Emporium" closed.

Meanwhile, Henry D. Meyer of Pasadena who owned Meyer's Department Stores (also written Meyer or Meyers) in Pasadena, Holtville, and Hemet, opened a Long Beach branch at 151 Pine around 1905. In March 1908 T. Sundbye of Huntington Beach partnered with Meyer and the store was known as Meyer & Sundbye's.

== 2nd Emporium 1909–1932 ==
=== 151 Pine ===
Under Meyer's ownership, The Emporium would reopen again on July 31, 1909, this time at 151 Pine, which Meyer had operated as "Meyers Department Store".

=== Broadway and Locust ===
On March 29, 1912, The Emporium moved to a new building at the northwest corner of Broadway and Locust.

=== Meyer sells to Ahlswede ===
On May 1, 1914, Henry D. Meyer of Pasadena sold the store to Ed. Ahlswede who had operated a large dry goods store in Chicago, and his son Herbert F. Ahlswede (b. July 5, 1878, Chicago).

== Merger with Marti's ==
In December 1932, The Emporium merged with Marti's department store, which as from December 30 operated at the former Emporium store at Broadway and Locust, now branded Marti's, and closed its old location at 4th and Pine. Marti's held a grand re-opening on January 12, 1933. Marti's in its advertising thanked its customers for their support despite the Great Depression, and in an advertisement profiled its new location: "Marti's New Store will be a Good Store Designed for the Masses without Frills and Fancies…but a Good Store" Nonetheless, Marti's closed for good shortly thereafter.
