= Chula Vista Center =

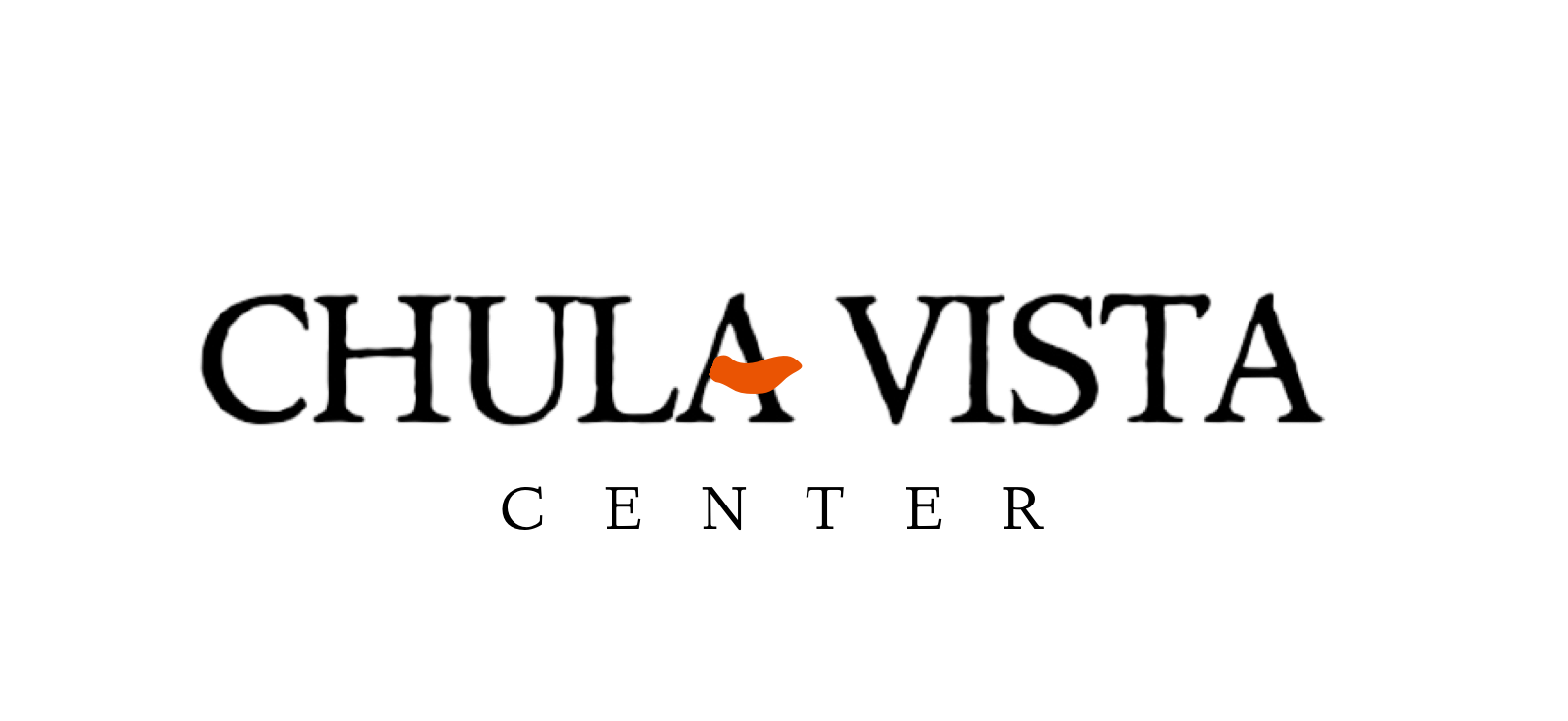

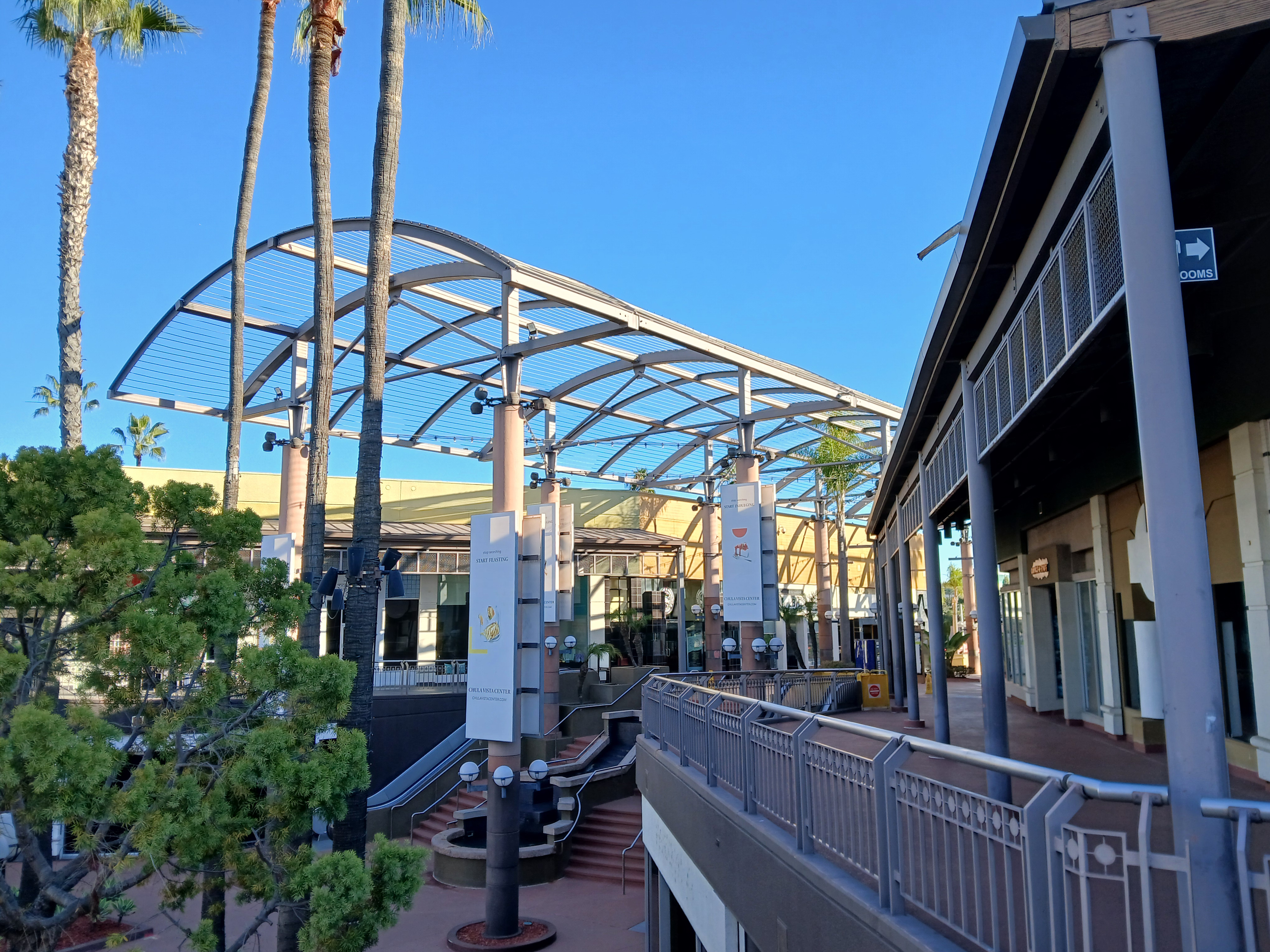
- Chula Vista Center in 2025
- Location: Chula Vista, California
- Coordinates: 32.6301°N 117.0861°W
- Address: 555 Broadway
- Opened: 1962
- Developer: The Broadway
- Manager: Primestor Development
- Owner: Primestor Development
- Architect: Charles Luckman & Associates
- Num. of stores: 67
- Num. of anchor tenants: 4 (3 open, 1 vacant)
- Floor area: 860,961 sq ft (79,985.9 m^{2})
- Floors: 2

Chula Vista Center is an outdoor shopping mall in Chula Vista, California. Opened in 1962, it features Burlington, JCPenney, and Macy's, with one vacant anchor last occupied by Sears. It is owned and managed by Primestor Development.

== History ==
Construction started in 1961 on the new shopping center designed by Charles Luckman & Associates and built by Del E. Webb Corporation. Chula Vista Center opened in 1962 as "one of the country's earliest regional malls". One of its original anchor stores was Marston's, which was later bought out by The Broadway, who also developed the mall. The mall was expanded in 1987 to include The Broadway (now Macy's), JCPenney, Sears, and Mervyn's. Homart Development Co. redeveloped the center which included the closing of a street for expanding the square footage. Chula Vista Center was the first outdoor center in their portfolio of shopping centers. Mervyn's closed in 2008 and became Burlington Coat Factory in 2012.

In 2015, Sears Holdings spun off 235 of its properties, including the Sears at Chula Vista Center, into Seritage Growth Properties.

On November 7, 2019, it was announced that Sears would be closing this location a part of a plan to close 96 stores nationwide. The store closed in February 2020.

On February 10th, 2025, Primestor Development announced its acquisition of Chula Vista Center from Brookfield Properties for $86.1 million.

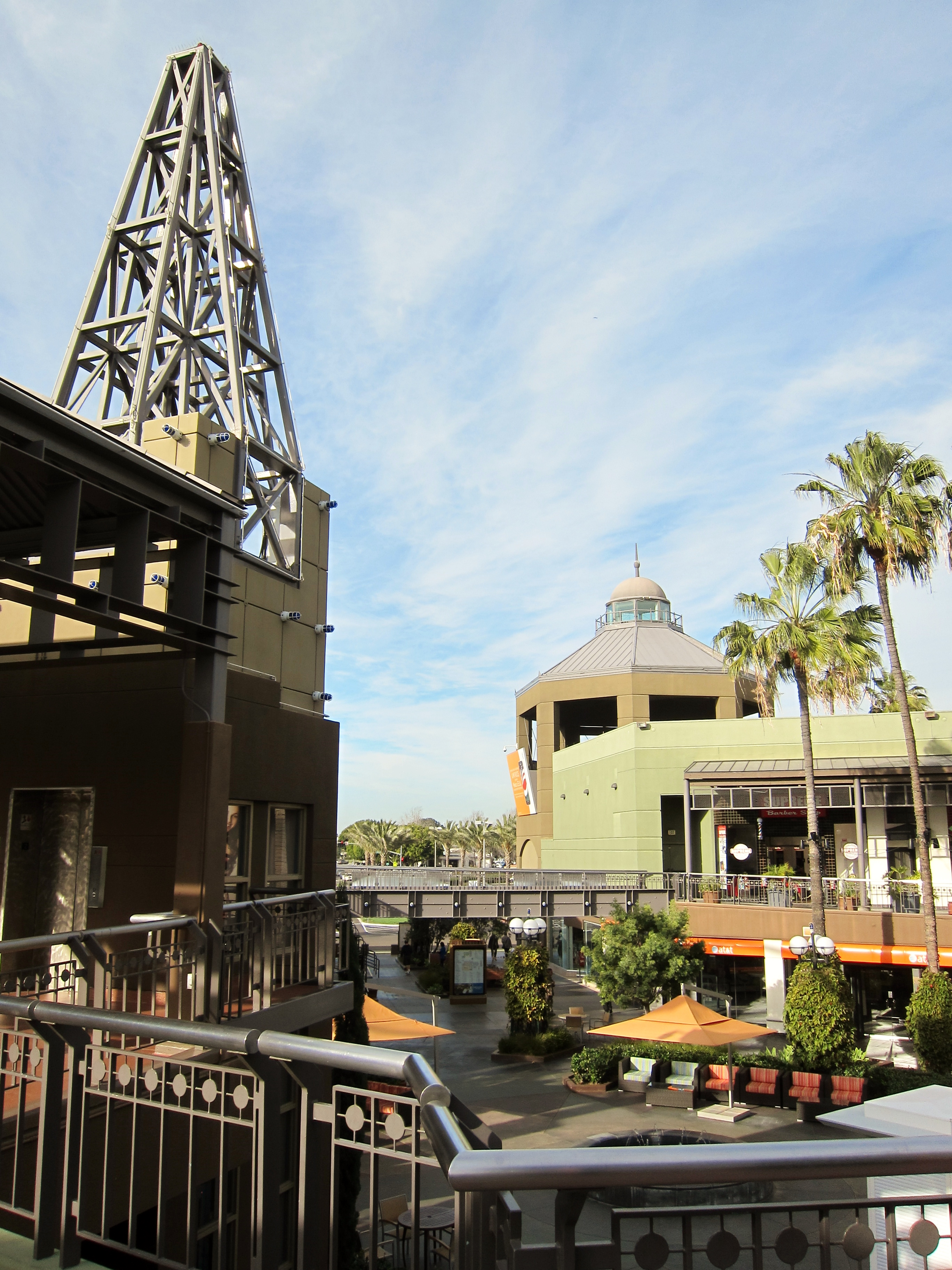
Chula Vista Center in 2016

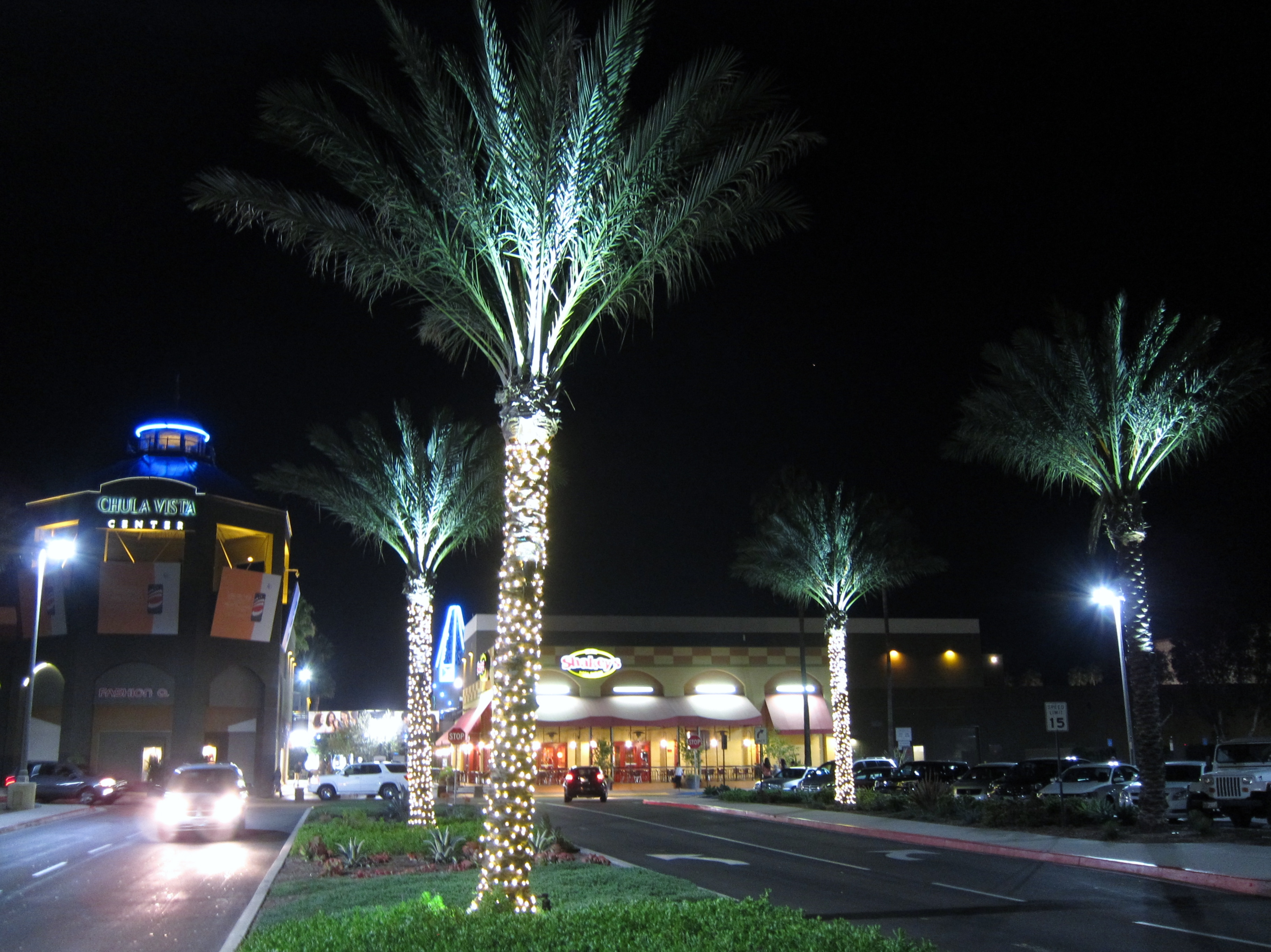
Chula Vista Center in 2015
