= Marston's (department store) =

Defunct department store

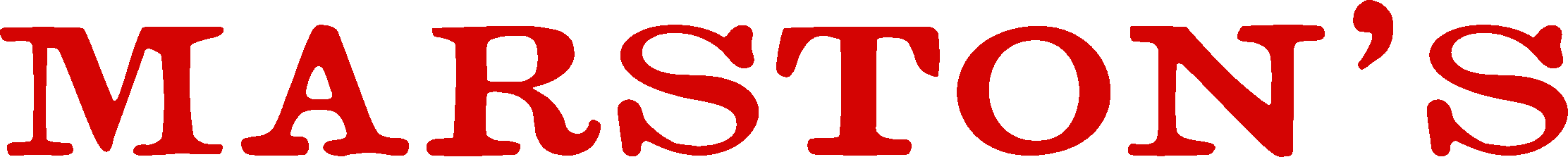
Marston's logo

Marston's was a department store based in San Diego, California, and founded by city leader George Marston. It had a downtown main store on Sixth Street and opened two suburban branches before being sold to The Broadway in 1961.

== Accolades ==
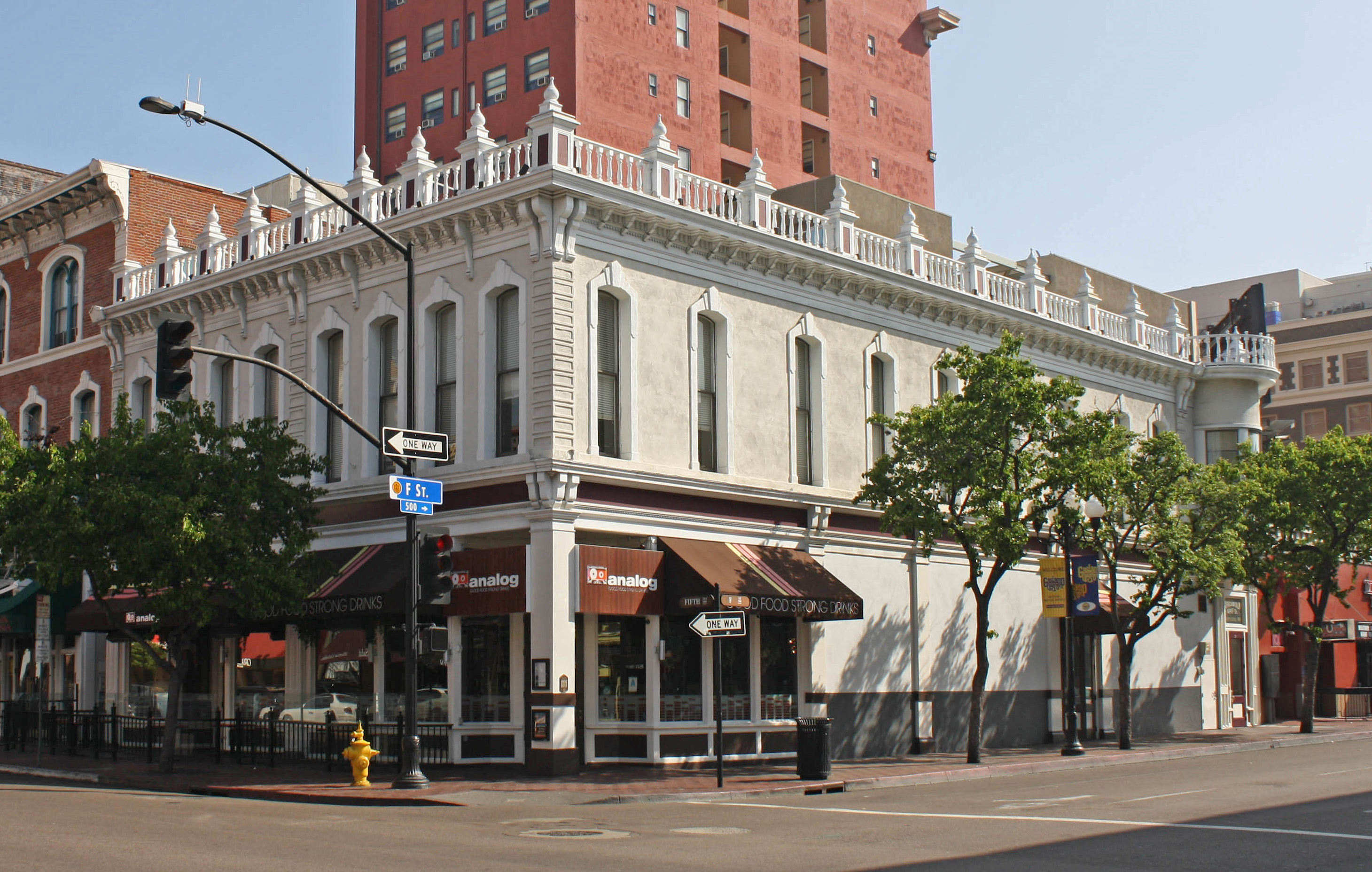
Marston's department store (1881-1896) at 509 Fifth Avenue

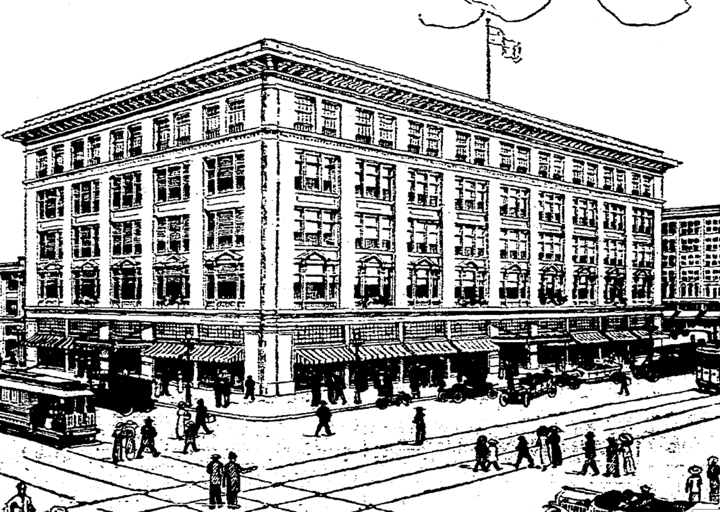
Marston's 1912 building, now demolished, from an ad

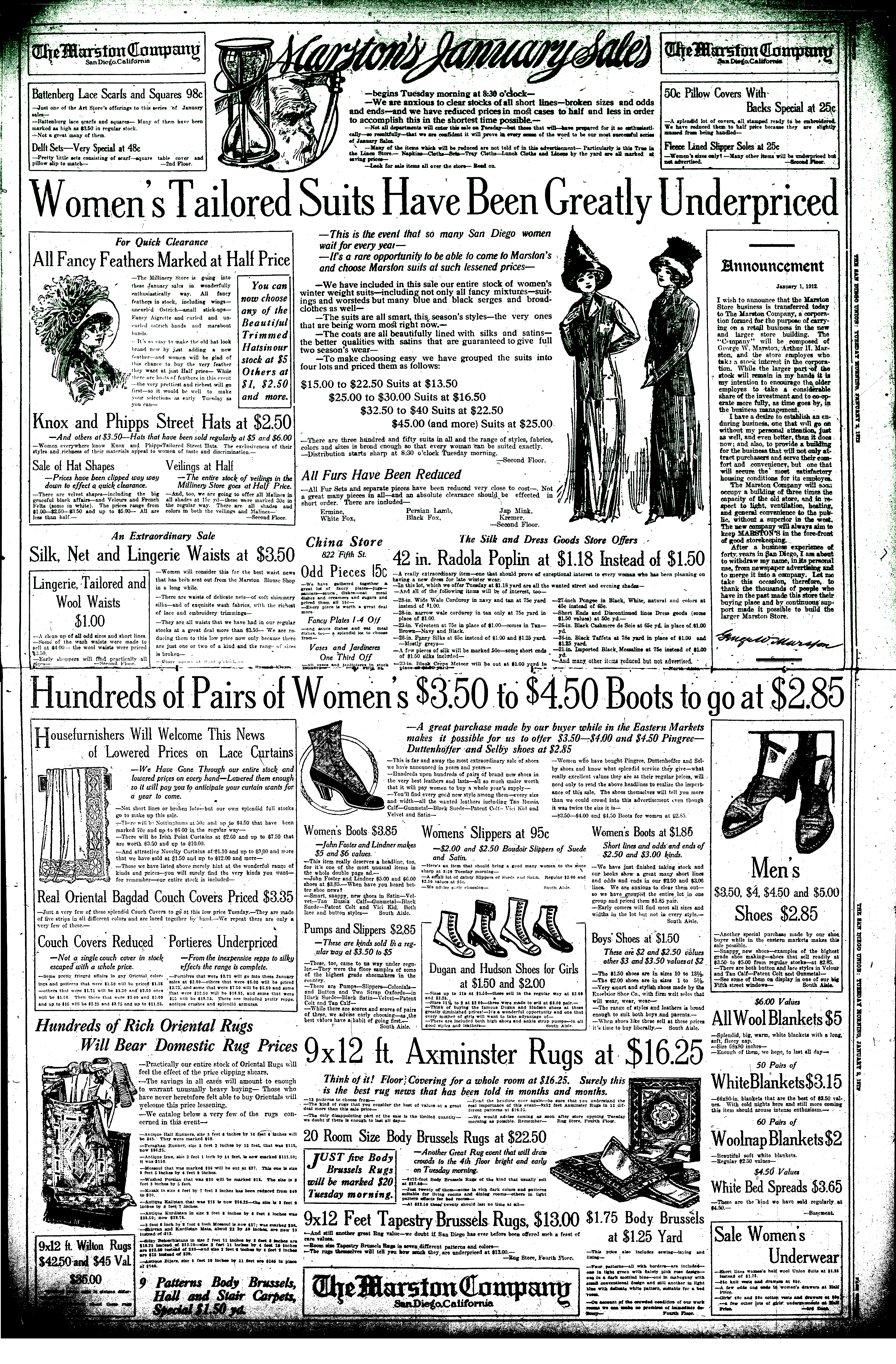
Marston's ad in the San Diego Union and Daily Bee, January 2, 1912

The San Diego Downtown News characterized the store as San Diego's "finest" department store and as "elegant". The Golden Era magazine carried an ad that proclaimed Marston's as the "leading dry goods house of San Diego."

== History ==
Marston started his merchandising career in 1870 at age 20 as an assistant bookkeeper in Aaron Pauly's store and wharf office. He worked there for two years. He then clerked for one year for Mr. Joseph Nash, who advertised his grocery, dry goods and clothing storestore as "the cheapest ... in the city". In 1873, Marston and his best friend and fellow clerk at Pauly's, Charles Hamilton, bought Nash's business and operated it together.

In 1878, Marston went at it alone and opened his own clothing and dry goods store along Fifth Avenue between G and H (now Market) streets. In 1881, the store expanded to 509 Fifth Avenue in a new two-story building.

In 1896, Marston's moved to 427 C Street (southwest corner of Fifth and C), with the construction of a large neo-Renaissance building costing $60,000 (~$1.94 million in 2024), built for him by his uncle, Stephen W. Marston. This four-story building featured wide aisles, an open court from the ground floor to the roof, and a novelty–an elevator. The property is now an office building still known as the Marston Building.

In 1907, Marston's made $15,000 (~$367,617 in 2024) in improvements to its store, turning the third floor stockroom into 5,000 square feet (460 m^{2}) of additional selling space, which was used for ladies' underwear and hosiery, and for dressing rooms. Money was also spent on new fixtures and interior decoration.

In 1912, Marston's moved to its final location across Fifth Avenue. In 1954, Marston's expanded into a new, six-story addition on Fifth Avenue, thus occupying the entire block on the north side of C Street between Fifth and Sixth avenues (demolished in the 1960s). In 1960, Marston's added a home furnishings annex in the former Parmelee-Dohrmann building (Seventh and C).

=== Tearoom ===
The 190-seat tearoom, the first sit-down serviced food offering at Marston's, opened April 27, 1955. It was designed by San Diego architect Sam Hamill. It had several 200- to 400-year-old Japanese screens. Pigskin covered the columns, and there was gray-green wall-to-wall carpet on the dining room floor and in the foyer. The menu included coconut cream pie, peanut butter and jelly sandwiches cut in wedges sans crust, a Pacific Paragon salad sandwich, tomatoes stuffed with cottage cheese, and a frozen fruit salad with whipped cream dressing served with minced turkey finger sandwiches. Sandwiches cost from 0.95 to 1.50 dollars, included open-faced Swiss cheese and turkey with thousand island dressing, corned beef on pumpernickel, and a club sandwich served with fruit aspic. At daily fashion shows, models walked among the tables presenting the latest fashion.

=== Legacy ===
Marston's sold its stores to The Broadway in 1961.

In 1962, the 200,680 square feet (18,644 m^{2}) Chula Vista Center branch was opened, still under the Marston's name. This branch was particularly noted for its murals, in the Orange Tree Restaurant murals depicting missions, orange groves, and mountains; in the women's "Fashion Circle" area, buildings in the South Bay and Coronado areas, including Hotel del Coronado; in the men's area the Spanish heritage of the area and early 19th century shipping activity, and rancheros on the way to a fiesta, and the old harbor; in the boy's area the Montgomery glider flight of 1833 and the Spirit of St. Louis.

The downtown flagship store was demolished in 1969 when Broadway opened a large new store at the new Fashion Valley Mall; and a Ross Dress for Less occupies the location.

The Grossmont Center and Chula Vista Center branches became Broadway stores, and are now Macy's stores.

Save Our Heritage Organisation (SOHO) maintains a collection of Marston's memorabilia at the Marston House, which is managed as a museum.
