= Grossmont Center =

- Location: La Mesa, California, United States
- Coordinates: 32.77804°N 117.01127°W
- Address: 5500 Grossmont Center Drive
- Opened: 1961
- Developer: Del E. Webb Construction Company
- Owner: FR Grossmont, LLC
- Architect: Welton Becket & Associates
- Num. of stores: 100
- Num. of anchor tenants: 7
- Floor area: 939,000 square feet (87,000 m^{2})
- Floors: 1
- Public transit: Grossmont Transit Center
- Website: grossmontcenter.com

Grossmont Center is an outdoor shopping mall in La Mesa, California, a suburb in East County, San Diego. The mall opened in 1961 and is managed by Federal Realty Investment Trust. The anchor stores are Target, Macy's, RH Outlet, Walmart, Barnes & Noble, and Reading Cinemas.

== History ==
The mall was built in 1961 by Del E. Webb Construction Company, with Welton Becket and associates as architect. It occupied 110 acres (45 ha) of land and cost over $20 million to build. At the time, it was the largest development in La Mesa's history.

Montgomery Ward and Marston's were the original two anchor stores. Marston's had a location in downtown San Diego, and began searching for a site for their first branch location in 1956. The store design featured 3,200 feet (980 m) of moldings, gold leaf lettering, murals painted by five artists, and a Gothic-style canopy over its entry. Marston's was sold to Broadway-Hale Stores in 1961, prior to the store's opening, and retained the Marston's name until 1964, when the store was renamed The Broadway. By 1965, a 1,000 seat movie theater was added to the mall.

Actress and Playboy model, June Wilkinson cut the ribbon at Harris & Frank Shoe store to celebrate their 105th anniversary. Other major tenants included Longs Drugs, Buddy's Barbershop, Dryer's Furniture, a Gallen Kamp, Holiday Shoes, Weatherby-Kayser, and Leed's Shoe stores, Grossmont Center Florist, House of Fabrics, Koven's Jeweler,S. H. Kress & Co. and F. W. Woolworth Company. See's Candies is an original store at Grossmont Center and stands in the same location since .

On October 5, 1961, 50,000 people attended the mall's opening ceremonies; 20,000 more than the population of La Mesa.

In 1979, Buffum's was added as a third anchor store in a newly constructed wing. In 1983, Bullock's joined as a fourth anchor and a new parking deck was constructed. In 1990, Buffum's closed and was replaced by Oshman's SuperSports USA in 1991. Oshman's was bought out by Sports Authority) in 2001.

In 1992, the mall's movie theater complex closed, and reopened following an expansion on May 26, 1995. Barnes & Noble Booksellers replaced the vacant Woolworths in November, 1997. In 1993, Bullock's and Woolworth closed while a Cost Plus World Market and a food court were added.. In 1995, Target opened in the vacant Bullock's store.

On August 2, 1993, a Chuck E. Cheese pizza restaurant opened at Grossmont Center as a relocation of a Pizza Time Theatre that was located in El Cajon. Chuck E. Cheese closed on December 29, 2024, due to their lease expiring. A new updated Chuck E. Cheese opened 15 minutes from Grossmont Center in Santee on September 18, 2023.

In 1996, The Broadway chain was bought out and rebranded to Macy's. Montgomery Ward closed as part of the chain's bankruptcy in 2000 and was replaced by a Walmart in 2004.

In 2016, Sports Authority closed after the chain filed for bankruptcy and was replaced by a Restoration Hardware Outlet in September, 2016.

In 2021 Federal Realty, a publicly traded real estate investment trust, purchased a majority interest in the center, which had been owned and operated for decades by one family. Reportedly, 99 percent of the retail space was occupied at the time of the sale. In 2025, Federal Realty announced they were considering options for major redevelopment, when they will have full control of the space, as most of the mall leases were coming due.

On January 8, 2026, Macy's announced that it would be closing as part of a plan to close 14 stores by the end of Q1 2026. The mall would be undergoing a $10 million multi-phase redevelopment funded by Federal Realty Investment Trust, who purchased the property about 4 years earlier. A new theater operator would be announced in the spring.
