= Arrowhead Towne Center =

Shopping mall in Glendale, Arizona, U.S.

Coordinates: 33°38′30″N 112°13′30″W

- Location: Glendale, Arizona, United Stares
- Address: 7700 W Arrowhead Towne Center
- Opened: October 1993; 33 years ago
- Developer: Westcor
- Manager: Macerich
- Owner: Macerich (60%); GIC (40%)
- Architect: Omniplan Architects
- Num. of stores: 180
- Num. of anchor tenants: 4
- Floor area: 1,197,000 sq ft (111,200 m^{2})
- Floors: 2
- Website: arrowheadtownecenter.com

Arrowhead Towne Center, often referred to by locals as Arrowhead Mall, is a super-regional shopping mall located in Glendale, Arizona (west suburban Phoenix). The mall is owned by Macerich and GIC Private Limited. The mall features Macy's, Dillard's, JCPenney, and Dick's Sporting Goods in addition to a 14-screen AMC Theatres, and Round 1. Arrowhead also serves as a transit center for Valley Metro Bus.

== History ==
The mall opened in October 1993 on land formerly occupied by an orange grove, located at Bell Road and 75th Avenue, and was jointly developed and owned by Westcor and General Growth Properties (the former which owned a two-thirds share and managed the mall, and the latter which owned a one-third share). Omniplan Architects of Dallas designed the mall, The Weitz Company, Inc. was general contractor who built the mall. When opened the mall was anchored by Robinsons-May, Montgomery Ward, Mervyn's, J. C. Penney, Dillard's, and an empty anchor pad that was not yet leased.

When Montgomery Ward declared bankruptcy in December 2000, they shut down all of their remaining locations, including Arrowhead. Shortly after, Sears and Roebuck announced they will be acquiring 18 of the former Wards space, including the location at Arrowhead. Sears opened in spring of 2002, a year after Wards closed.

In 2002, Westcor was acquired by Macerich, who continues to manage the mall today. In 2011, GGP sold its 1/3 ownership in the mall (along with its 1/3 ownership of Superstition Springs Center in Mesa), with Macerich assuming full ownership.

In 2006, Macy's acquired Robinsons-May and converted the Arrowhead store into a Macy's store.

Since about 2007, Arrowhead Towne Center has been undergoing a transition to serve a more affluent and upscale shopper, in relation to its traditional middle-income customer base. The mall is already home to the West Valley's first Sephora location (opened in 2007), as well as Swarovski, Coach, and the West Valley's first Apple Store (which opened in the summer of 2008). In the past, West Valley shoppers have had to travel to Biltmore Fashion Park and Scottsdale Fashion Square, on the east side of the metropolitan area, to patronize retailers of this caliber. All of these tenants are new to Glendale.

In 2008, Mervyn's went out of business and closed. Forever 21 reopened in the former Mervyn's space on March 27, 2009.

Also in 2008, sporting goods retailer, Dick's Sporting Goods held their grand opening.

In 2016, Macerich sold 40% of the mall to GIC Private Limited.

In 2019, the Sears anchor store closed.

In May 2024, Macerich bought back their previous 40% remaining in the mall.
