= Skysong =

Skysong may refer to:

- Skysong, a character in The Immortals series by Tamora Pierce
- SkySong, a real estate development in Scottsdale, Arizona
- Skysong Innovations, the technology transfer arm of Arizona State University
