= Pine Ridge Marketplace =

- Location: Prescott, Arizona, U.S.
- Coordinates: 34°32′52″N 112°24′33″W
- Address: 3250 Gateway Blvd
- Opened: March 8, 2002
- Developer: Westcor
- Owner: ZL Prescott, LLC
- Num. of stores: 63
- Num. of anchor tenants: 2
- Floor area: 589,854 square feet (54,799.2 m^{2})
- Floors: 1
- Website: pineridgemarketplace.com

Pine Ridge Marketplace (formerly Prescott Gateway Mall) is a single-level enclosed shopping mall in Prescott, Arizona, United States. Opened on March 8, 2002, it includes JCPenney and Dillard's among its anchor stores. Espire Sports, a sports complex, opened in the anchor space formerly occupied by Sears.

== History ==
Westcor first announced plans to build a mall east of Prescott on Arizona State Route 69 in 1998. The decision was met with local opposition from members of the community, and petitioned for a referendum after city council approved a change in zoning. Under Westcor's original plans, the proposed mall would have JCPenney, Sears and Dillard's as anchor stores. The former two stores were already anchors at an existing mall, Ponderosa Plaza, but the managers of both stores considered their existing locations too small.

Following the referendum, a lawsuit was filed over the agreement made between the city and mall developers. The lawsuit was later dropped.

Construction began on the mall in 2001. Besides the three anchor stores, other confirmed tenants at the mall included Barnes & Noble and Linens 'n Things, the latter of which was located in an outdoor village section in front of the mall. Although Westcor officials said that the diversity of the Prescott market made it difficult to choose tenants, they expected the mall to be over 96 percent leased by 2002.

Prescott Gateway Mall opened to the public on March 8, 2002, with a "Party of the Year" the day before. Among the stores that were new to the Prescott market included Buckle, KB Toys and Casual Corner. It was 80 percent leased at opening, and increased to 86 percent a year later, adding 24 stores. After Linens 'n Things closed in 2008, it became a Bed Bath & Beyond in late 2009.

Barnes & Noble, an original tenant, closed in 2011. Trader Joe's, announced in 2011, opened a store at the Shops at Prescott Gateway outparcel in 2012. The mall was first sold to the Tabani Group in 2013, and was then later sold to Kohan Retail Investment Group in 2018, who purchased the mall for $8.8 million. In 2015, Sears Holdings spun off 235 of its properties, including the Sears at Prescott Gateway Mall, into Seritage Growth Properties. On November 7, 2019, it was announced that Sears would be closing as part of a plan to close 96 stores nationwide. The store closed on February 2, 2020.

After Sears closed, the space was subdivided and Espire Sports, a sporting company, opened a 100,000 square foot (9290.3 m²) sports complex. The Espire Sports complex offers a wide variety of sporting activities including pickleball, a gym, a putting green, basketball, martial arts, and a golf simulator. A restaurant called Augie’s also opened in part of the former Sears space.

On January 1, 2024, Prescott Gateway Mall was renamed to its current moniker, Pine Ridge Marketplace, after ZL Prescott, LLC, the new and current owner of the mall, completed a $2.5 million renovation of the shopping center.
