= La Encantada (shopping center) =

Shopping mall in Tucson, Arizona

- Location: Catalina Foothills, Arizona
- Coordinates: 32.324733°N 110.930135°W
- Address: 2905 East Skyline Drive
- Opened: November 7th, 2003
- Developer: Westcor
- Manager: Westcor
- Owner: Town West
- Num. of stores: 50+
- Num. of anchor tenants: 0
- Floor area: 258,000 sq ft (24,000 m^{2})
- Floors: 2
- Parking: Outdoor and garage
- Website: laencantadashoppingcenter.com

La Encantada is an upscale outdoor shopping mall located in Catalina Foothills, an unincorporated suburb of Tucson, Arizona, United States. It is owned by Town West, and was owned by Macerich until September 2021. It opened in 2003 as the only luxury shopping center in the Tucson region.

== History ==
La Encantada began in planning stages in early 1998. With the successful Kierland Commons in Phoenix as an example, Westcor hoped to recreate the same success in Tucson.

The center was designed with a Spanish hacienda style and construction began in 2002. By 2003, more than 80% of the center was leased.

The first phase opened with AJ's Fine Foods, Ann Taylor, Anthropologie, Apple Store, Coach, Cole Haan, Crate & Barrel, Lucky Brand Jeans, and Pottery Barn.

Phase II established the center as the premier shopping destination in the Tucson area, landing a score of first luxury stores for the region, including BCBG Max Azria, Brooks Brothers, Brooks Brothers Country Club, Louis Vuitton, Sigrid Olsen, St. John, and Tiffany & Co. Tucsonans previously had to travel to the Phoenix/Scottsdale area, or out-of-state, to patronize this caliber of retail.
