= Northern Crossing (shopping mall) =

Former shopping mall in Glendale, Arizona, United States

- Location: Glendale, Arizona, United States
- Coordinates: 33°33′09″N 112°10′57″W
- Opened: August 30, 1973
- Closed: 2000 (after 26–27 years)
- Developer: Ericson Development Co., Watson Construction Co.
- Num. of stores: 50
- Num. of anchor tenants: 4
- Floor area: 600,000 sq ft (56,000 m^{2})
- Floors: 1

Northern Crossing, formerly Valley West Mall from 1973 to 1996 and Manistee Town Center from 1996 to 2000, is a shopping mall south of Northern Avenue between 55th and 59th Avenues in Glendale, Arizona, United States. Built in 1973 as an enclosed shopping mall, it was turned into a power center in 2000 after years of decline. Northern Crossing is a power center whose anchor stores are Walmart and Lowe's.

== History ==
Valley West Mall opened August 30, 1973, as the first major shopping center in the city of Glendale; the Montgomery Ward anchor store, the fourth in the Valley, had already opened for business on July 11. The mall was originally owned by Valley West Shopping Center, Inc.; the design by Edward M. Cohon and Associates featured Spanish architectural elements. Developed by two companies from Minneapolis, the mall was headlined by Montgomery Ward, the Boston Store, Bostrom's, and McMahan's Furniture, with 50 other stores. One of those companies, Ericson Development, went on to start construction on a similar shopping center to be built in Tempe and also anchored by Ward and the Boston Store; they stopped work on the mall due to cost overruns. Bostrom's, a housewares retailer, went bankrupt in 1975. In 1976, Boston Store built a newer and larger store in the mall; their previous location was sold to J. C. Penney, which relocated from a smaller store in downtown Glendale.

The mall continued to hold its own for 20 years, even as new shopping options including Metrocenter and Westridge Mall opened on the west side. IRT Property Co. of Atlanta invested $3 million in interior and exterior improvements in the early 1990s, and the mall was 92 percent leased in early 1993. However, Valley West suffered the loss of two critical anchor tenants when Arrowhead Towne Center opened as the premier mall in the West Valley later that year. JCPenney and Montgomery Ward—occupying 55,000 sq ft (5,100 m^{2}) and 130,000 sq ft (12,000 m^{2}), respectively—defected to the new shopping center. After intense pressure from community groups to maintain a presence at the mall, Montgomery Ward opened an "Outlet World" store, the third of its kind for the chain, as a replacement at Valley West. The Outlet World store joined the Boston Store and Bealls Outlet as the remaining anchors. The center lost out in its attempts to attract anchors that left Maryvale Mall, another dying center, when those retailers opted to locate at the larger Westridge. The next year, McMahan's was acquired by the national Heilig-Meyers furniture chain.

The Arrowhead opening and loss of anchors sent Valley West into a tailspin. The mall only had 43 stores of a capacity of 75 by January 1995 and just 17 by October. Retail experts told the city of Glendale that the mall was "functionally obsolete" and that a "pinpointed earthquake" might be useful at the mall site. That September, the Boston Store, a charter tenant and anchor, closed after 22 years.

=== Manistee Town Center ===
IRT sold the ailing mall to Louis Darwish, owner of shopping centers in Glendale and Mesa, in 1996. Just four stores remained: Outlet World, Heilig-Meyers, and two inline tenants. Darwish announced plans to renovate the exterior and mall entrances and rename the center Manistee Town Center, to connect with the redevelopment of the former Manistee Ranch, adjacent to the mall site, into housing. For several years under Darwish, the health of the mall improved, attracting several new tenants and reopening the mall's movie theater. In 1997, General Factory opened in the former Boston Store anchor, but the Outlet World closed, along with the Wards auto center, which had remained in operation after the banner conversion.

After an effort by Darwish to relocate county justice courts to the mall property was turned down in 1998, the relationship between Darwish and the city of Glendale soured. This culminated in a lawsuit filed on December 31, 1998, claiming the city interfered in his efforts to attract tenants and retain a charter school, Maya High School, that was leasing space in the mall; Maya held classes in a former arcade and used a former auto parts store as office space. Several larger tenants, including General Factory and World Market Place, closed in 1999. The final anchor, Heilig-Meyers, closed its doors in 2000 as part of its Chapter 11 bankruptcy filing and shuttering of 302 locations. The mall was left with two churches, the high school, and a Maricopa County job center.

The mall made one last notable appearance when shooting of the movie Arac Attack—released in 2002 as Eight Legged Freaks—used the deserted shopping center in February 2001, with the former Montgomery Ward converted into a sound stage. Renamed the Prosperity Mall, the site was convenient for the film, which had also shot scenes in Superior.

=== Northern Crossing ===
After filming was completed, studies were undertaken on potential future uses for the Manistee Town Center site. The city of Glendale acquired the mall for $11 million in May 2001. This helped facilitate part of a redevelopment agreement with The Ellman Companies, a condition of the same deal that brought the Phoenix Coyotes to Glendale. The mall was then mostly demolished in 2002, except for the portion used by Maya High School; after it moved out in May, police and federal agents used the building for training exercises before the remaining section was torn down, allowing the Ellman Northern Crossing power center to be built. The anchor stores of Northern Crossing, first announced in 2003, are Lowe's and Walmart. The rest of the center opened in 2005 and is managed by Colliers International.
