= SouthPark Mall (Illinois) =

Shopping mall in Moline, Illinois, United States

- Location: Moline, Illinois, United States
- Coordinates: 41.467335°N 90.502753°W
- Address: 4500 16th Street
- Opened: February 27, 1974; 52 years ago
- Developer: General Growth Properties
- Manager: Kohan Retail Investment Group
- Owner: Kohan Retail Investment Group
- Num. of stores: 60
- Num. of anchor tenants: 5
- Floor area: 825,000 sq ft (76,600 m^{2})
- Floors: 1 (2 in JCPenney and Von Maur)
- Public transit: Quad Cities MetroLINK
- Website: shopsouthparkmall-il.com

SouthPark Mall is a shopping mall located in Moline, Illinois. As Moline is part of the Quad Cities of Illinois and Iowa, the mall serves the population of these cities. The mall is located southwest of the intersection of Interstate 74 and Illinois Route 5 (John Deere Road) at 4500 16th Street. SouthPark Mall is one of two regional malls in the Quad Cities area, the other being NorthPark Mall in Davenport, Iowa.

The current owner and operator is Kohan. The mall had been operated by the Simon Property Group, Inc., from 1998 to 2011, and by Macerich from 2012 to 2025. Before 1998, General Growth Properties managed and owned the property. The mall's anchor stores are Dillard's, Dick's Sporting Goods, JCPenney, Von Maur, and Ashley HomeStore. The one-level mall has over 60 stores and a gross leasable area of 825,000 square feet.

== History ==
SouthPark Mall was built by General Growth Properties at a cost of $12 million on 47 acres (19 ha) of land that General Growth purchased in 1966. Montgomery Ward, Petersen Harned Von Maur, and Younkers were the mall's three original anchors when it opened on February 27, 1974. SouthPark has been expanded twice: JCPenney was added in 1978, while Sears and a food court were added in 1990. Montgomery Ward closed in early 2001 when the chain went out of business, and the anchor space remained vacant for three years. Dillard's eventually leased and they rebuilt the space, which they then opened in 2004. A Walgreens pharmacy operated in the mall until 2003, when a new free-standing store was built off-site; Old Navy opened a store in Walgreens' place in 2006, but in May 2013 Old Navy closed their location due to poor sales at both Quad Cities metro locations, the other in Davenport, IA. The mall has struggled to keep tenants since the turn of the century, the mall used to be full of national retailers, but now nearly half of the store fronts are filled with local or regional retailers. Most of the national retailers that left went to NorthPark Mall in Davenport, Iowa.

The Sears store closed in October 2013 as part of the national retailer's plan to reduce expenses. Coming not long after the closing of an Old Navy store, Sears' departure left SouthPark with four anchors. In September 2013, the city of Moline approved a TIF for the mall area, with Macerich and the city working on a plan of redevelopment. A two-phase redevelopment plan, which will eventually involve substantial updates to the appearance and shopping convenience, were slated to begin in April 2014, at which time demolition of the 1990 addition – containing the former Sears and food court areas – were slated to begin. Additional renovation is slated to begin in 2015.

Renovation of the main concourse of the mall was completed in November 2014. The mall demolished the former Sears store and the food court, a Dick's Sporting Goods was built where Sears once stood. In 2015 Macerich worked on landscaping around the mall property, as well as repaving parking lots and bridges entering the mall.

On April 18, 2018, it was announced that Younkers would be closing as the parent, Bon-Ton Stores, was going out of business. The store closed on August 29, 2018. In August 2018, Ashley HomeStore opened a store in the space near the former Younkers store.
