= Superstition Springs Center =

Shopping mall in Mesa, Arizona, U.S.

- Location: Mesa, Arizona, U.S.
- Coordinates: 33.3904°N 111.6901°W
- Address: 6555 E Southern Ave, Mesa, AZ 85206
- Opened: November 2, 1990; 36 years ago
- Developer: Westcor and General Growth Properties
- Manager: Macerich
- Owner: Macerich
- Architect: Rafique Islam
- Num. of stores: 170
- Num. of anchor tenants: 5 (3 open, 3 vacant)
- Floor area: 1,204,759 sq ft (111,925.8 m^{2})
- Floors: 2 (3 in former Macy's)
- Parking: 6,842 spaces
- Website: superstitionsprings.com

Superstition Springs Center is a shopping mall located in Mesa, Arizona. It is owned by Macerich, and was developed by Westcor. The mall features the traditional retailers Dillard's, JCPenney, and two vacant anchors that were once Macy's and Sears in addition to an 8-screen Picture Show. The mall features prominent specialty retailer such as Buckle, Tillys, Hollister, Charlotte Russe, BoxLunch, and See's Candies. The mall features an outdoor amphitheatre and a fountain that converts into a stage featuring free concerts from May to August on Saturday evenings. The mall also serves as a transit center for Valley Metro Bus.

== History ==
Superstition Springs Center was built and completed in 1990, and was jointly developed and owned by Westcor and General Growth Properties. The original architect was Rafique Islam. The Weitz Company, Inc. was the general contractor. When it first opened, most of the area surrounding the mall was open fields. At the time, it rested at the end of a freeway (U.S. Route 60), and was considered too far away from developed areas to be successful. However, since its opening, the area around Superstition Springs Center has seen significant growth; as of 2009, it held an estimated population of 337,000 in its primary trade area.

In February 2002, the mall underwent remodeling to include exterior paint and lighting, interior paint, flooring, and lighting to create a new refined atmosphere with color, texture, and regional imagery.

Originally majority-owned and managed by Westcor (two-thirds share, with General Growth Properties owning the other third), in 2002 Superstition Springs Center became part of Macerich's portfolio, with Westcor kept as management. In June 2011, GGP sold its 1/3 ownership in the mall (along with its 1/3 ownership of Arrowhead Towne Center in Glendale), with Westcor assuming full ownership.

In the 2020s, the mall struggled to retain national chains causing the mall to rely more on local businesses to backfill the empty space. As of 2021, less than 50% of the mall's tenant mix is occupied by national retailers. The surrounding area has also experienced a decline in retailers including the Mesa Pavilions which is now mostly vacant and slated to be demolished for multifamily housing. Some attempts have been made to bring life back into the mall, including the relocation of Ross Dress For less & Ulta Beauty into the former Sports Authority.

== Anchors ==
The Macy's location was built to be Broadway Southwest (the last store built by then owner Carter Hawley Hale). This location was halted during a hostile take over attempt by the Limited and sold off to Robinsons-May in 1994.

In 2010, the former Mervyn's became a furniture store called Home Sleep Home, which went out of business. It was then divided up into two junior anchors. The lower level was replaced with a miniature golf course called Lunar Mini Golf and later Phoenix Sofa Factory. Phoenix Sofa Factory closed in October 2017, leaving the lower level vacant. The upper level became Sports Authority, which went out of business in 2016, and became Book Vault a year later. Book Vault closed on October 28, 2018, with Ross filling the space in 2019.

On October 16, 2018, it was announced that the Sears anchor store would close.

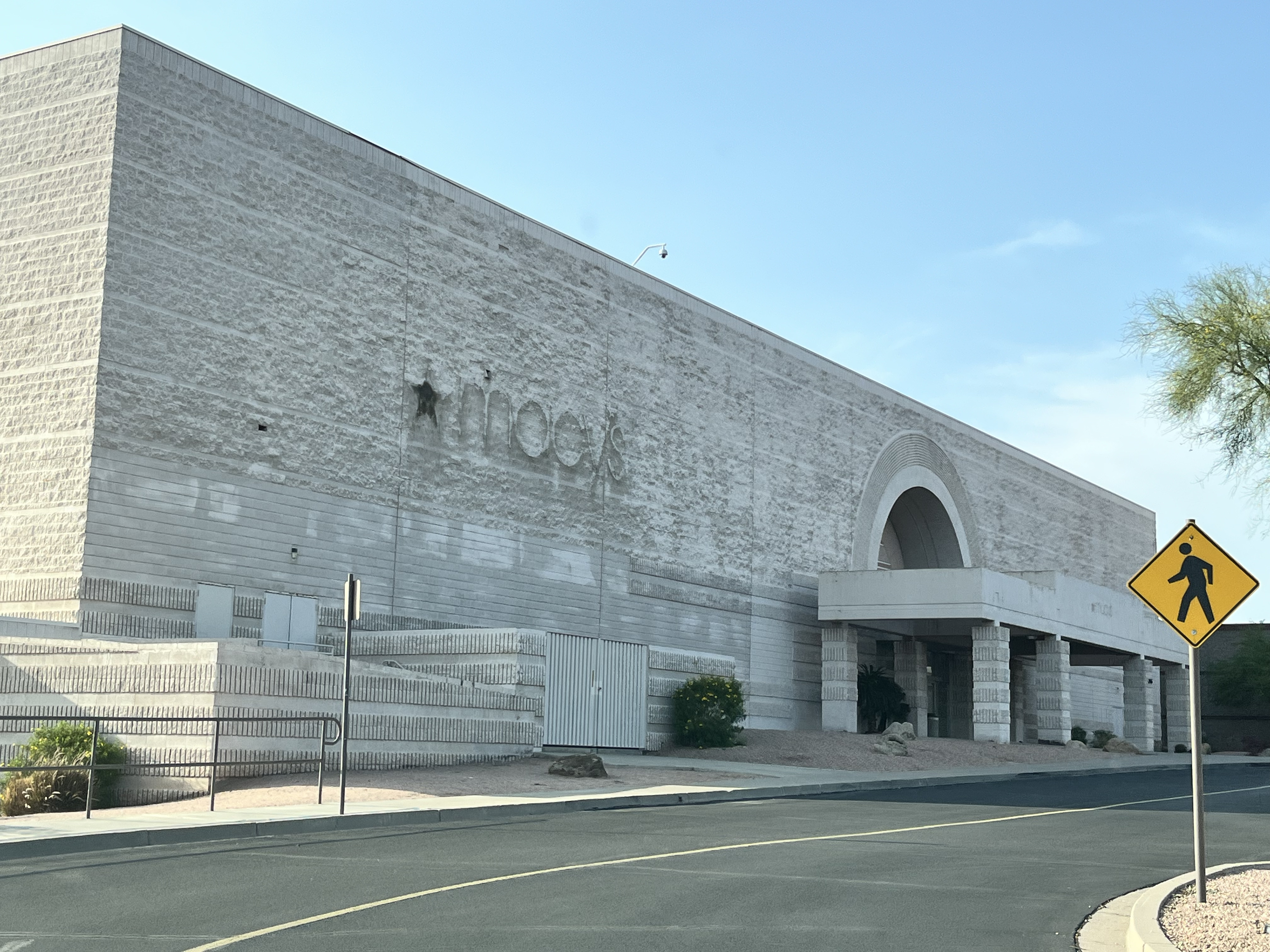
Macy's 6 days after closure. Signage removed leaving a 'Label Scar.' This store was on the list of 2025 closures. It was the only one from Arizona on the list.

On January 9, 2025, it was announced that the Macy's anchor store would close, as part of a plan to close 66 other locations nationwide. Macy's closed on March 23, 2025, leaving JCPenney and Dillard's as the only anchors.
