= Los Arcos Mall =

Shopping mall in Scottsdale, Arizona

Coordinates: 33°27′50″N 111°55′27″W

- Los Arcos Mall in 1993, as seen from the southwest
- Location: Scottsdale, Arizona, U.S.
- Address: 7505 East McDowell Road
- Opened: October 20, 1969 (anchor stores); November 21, 1969
- Closed: 1999
- Developer: Westcor
- Owner: The Ellman Companies (1996–1999)
- Architect: Burke, Kober, Nicolais and Archuleta
- Num. of stores: 75
- Num. of anchor tenants: 2
- Floor area: 607,350 square feet (56,425 m^{2})
- Floors: 1

Los Arcos Mall was an enclosed shopping mall on the southeast corner of Scottsdale and McDowell roads in Scottsdale, Arizona. The mall, which operated from 1969 to 1999, featured a Spanish architectural motif and took its name from "The Arches" in Spanish. In the 1990s, the mall lost shoppers and both of its anchors, particularly to the Scottsdale Fashion Square center, which was closer to population growth in the city. The last anchor, Sears, left Los Arcos for Fashion Square in February 1999.

The property then became the subject of years of highly controversial development proposals, including a proposed arena for the Phoenix Coyotes hockey team that ended amid infighting between the developer and the city, and a proposed retail redevelopment that crumbled in the face of heavy neighborhood opposition. After both of these plans failed, the site was sold to the Arizona State University (ASU) Foundation and redeveloped as SkySong, a technology and innovation–focused complex with office, retail, and residential components.

== Mall history ==
=== Opening ===
After construction began in October 1968, Los Arcos Mall opened formally on November 21, 1969, though two of its anchor stores—Sears and Broadway-Hale Stores—opened on October 20. When the mall formally opened, just 30 of the 70 inline tenants were open for business. The mall featured a Spanish interior design by the Los Angeles architectural firm of Burke, Kober, Nicolais and Archuleta, with murals of Native Americans painted by Mexican artist José María Servín and a gazebo made in Mexico City as major design features. The Broadway store was designed by Charles Luckman.

Los Arcos was the first enclosed mall developed by Phoenix-based Westcor Partners, led by Russ Lyon Jr. and John L. Holmes; the two had previously worked together to build Tower Plaza, an open-air center. It cost $6 million to build (not counting the cost of the department stores), and was built on 41.9 acres (17.0 ha) of land. The cross-shaped, air-conditioned, enclosed mall was anchored by a 156,000-square-foot (14,500 m^{2}), $2.2 million, three-story Broadway Southwest on the east end. A 253,318-square-foot (23,534.0 m^{2}), $6.1 million Sears anchored the south end, consisting of two floors and a full basement, as well as a 25,178-square-foot (2,339.1 m^{2}) Sears auto center in an outbuilding. Both department stores were the third metro Phoenix locations in their respective chains. Among the inline tenants was a movie theater on the lower level; three outparcel buildings would be built for the two anchors' automotive centers and a First Federal Savings and Loan office.

=== Decline ===
The first signs of decline came in 1979 when the 1,000,000-square-foot (93,000 m^{2})-plus Fiesta Mall opened in Mesa with four major department stores, including both of the anchor tenants of Los Arcos; sales dropped 5 percent at the mall that year as some customers began shopping at Fiesta. During the 1980s and 1990s, Scottsdale Fashion Square, three miles to the north of the Los Arcos site, went through several expansions and renovations and began to serve as Scottsdale's regional mall. While several retailers, such as Sam Goody and Express, had locations at both malls, retailers increasingly began to open their stores at Scottsdale Fashion Square. Additionally, growth in Scottsdale had spread northward, with several newer and closer shopping options to that area; in comparison, Papago Park, the Salt River and Salt River Pima-Maricopa Indian Community hemmed in growth prospects for the trading area around Los Arcos.

Lyon and Holmes sold the mall to Equity Properties and Development Company of Chicago, controlled by Sam Zell, in 1988; the new owners immediately planned the mall's first major renovation. The next year, construction began to turn Los Arcos into "a mall of the '90s": the project included an extensive interior renovation, adding tile floors, skylights, and new interior decorations; the second phase added a 280-seat enclosed food court. The work also added fire sprinklers and removed asbestos.

By 1995, however, the mall was ailing, suffering from losing business to Scottsdale Fashion Square. That year, Federated Department Stores purchased The Broadway; most stores were converted to Macy's, but doubt was immediately cast on the future of the Los Arcos location. Equity Properties asked the city of Scottsdale to consider loaning it money to buy the store building from the chain in the event that it closed. The store's closure was announced that November.

After the closure of The Broadway, the city of Scottsdale declared the mall a redevelopment zone; Equity said that it had lost $25 million attempting to save the development, which included an attempt to convert it to a power center featuring a Home Depot store.

== Hockey arena proposal ==
Equity had put the mall up for sale in 1995, but it was not until the end of 1996 that a potential buyer emerged: the Phoenix-based Ellman Companies, owned by Steve Ellman, which paid $14 million for the mall and former Broadway. The sale did not include the Sears, which continued operating. In August 1997, Ellman announced its plans for the mall property, which included a new movie theater anchoring a mixed-use complex. That same month, Sears announced its intention to move to Scottsdale Fashion Square. The Ellman Companies later stated that the anchors' refusal to consider the site changed its renovation plans into redevelopment plans.

A year later, Ellman presented three revised plans. One of them was headlined by a $140 million hockey arena to house the Phoenix Coyotes of the National Hockey League, along with smaller proposals for a power center and an updated version of the 1997 concept. The plan including the arena and power center survived and was unveiled to the public on September 28, with a cost of $600 million. The hockey team cited obstructed view seats at America West Arena, a venue built primarily for basketball, as a reason to pursue a new arena.

The plans became the subject of heated debate. At the first public meeting, an overflow crowd of opponents and supporters gathered. Opponents feared impacts on the surrounding community and opposed a proposal to use state sales tax revenues to pay for part of the project. The two sides started dueling petition drives. Meanwhile, Sears closed on February 13, and many remaining stores used co-tenancy clauses in their leases to exit the mall at the same time.

The first major hurdle was a May 18, 1999, vote to allow Scottsdale to form a stadium district with at least one other Maricopa County municipality to pay for the project. The measure passed by a margin of 63 percent to 37 percent with near-record turnout, and, with Avondale joining as a stadium district partner, the path was clear to set up the district and send the sales tax proposal to voters in November. While backers of the measure celebrated, the physical condition of the Los Arcos property began to deteriorate, with visible neglect in landscaping.

Approaching the November 1999 state sales tax vote, Ellman announced a proposal to recapture all city tax funds generated by the Los Arcos property for 30 years, prompting concerns of an overly large public subsidy. That measure passed as well, giving the developers 23 months to get the arena ready in time for its planned opening for the 2001–02 NHL season. However, the project hit a major snag when Coyotes owner Richard Burke and Steve Ellman disagreed over financing and a construction timeline that would not see the team move in until the 2002–03 season; as a result, Burke put the team up for sale. In a move that seemingly put the Los Arcos project back on track, Steve Ellman bought the team for $87 million in a deal approved by NHL commissioner Gary Bettman in April 2000. The contract contained a clause allowing Steve Ellman to sell or move the team after the 2001 season if the arena project did not materialize.

After a salvage auction was held in February, demolition began in May 2000, though the Red Robin restaurant on the outside planned to remain as long as it could, along with two bank outparcels. The Red Robin had sued the Ellman Companies for breaking promises that they would be included in the redevelopment; the business continued to operate while SWAT teams practiced on the partially demolished structure. Ellman remained confident that the project would open in 2002. However city leaders saw documentation from Steve Ellman that showed he planned to sell the Los Arcos complex a decade after it was completed for a $225 million profit; Scottsdale officials argued that money should also go to taxpayers.

By October, Steve Ellman had told Scottsdale city manager Jan Dolan that he was beginning to scout other sites. As this was happening, the sale of the NHL franchise to Steve Ellman and minority owner Wayne Gretzky was continually delayed. Early in 2001, Steve Ellman suggested scaling back the overall project. Former state attorney general Grant Woods was enlisted to keep the project alive and lobby for needed time extensions as Ellman launched a media blitz. The Scottsdale city council voted 4–3 on March 6, 2001, to extend the life of the stadium district, allowing the Los Arcos arena project to continue. Demolition of the mall, which had come to a halt, resumed later that month, this time including the Red Robin.

However, the constant delays and conflicts with Scottsdale had pushed Ellman elsewhere. On April 11, 2001, Steve Ellman announced that he had reached a deal with Glendale to buy land just off the Loop 101 freeway for a new arena and retail development, which became Gila River Arena and the Westgate Entertainment District. The deal would also include the redevelopment of another failed mall—Manistee Town Center—as a power center.

== Los Arcos Town Center proposal ==
The collapse of the Los Arcos arena plan put the city of Scottsdale back at the drawing board on plans to reuse the property. Part of the parking lot was used as storage for a Chevrolet dealership in 2002. That January, the Ellman Companies, which still owned the property, proposed a shopping center to be anchored by Walmart, Sam's Club, and Lowe's. However, the proposal met with a cool reception at Scottsdale city council due to continuing political hostilities with Steve Ellman. The project was still mired in opposition a year later, when councilmembers considered condemning the property to take control of the parcel from the Ellman Companies.

Neighborhood opposition also coalesced to the retail proposal. The city council, however, approved the deal on a 4–3 vote in July 2003. Opponents quickly mobilized, forming a group known as "STOP 'EM" to send a referendum on the potential $200 million subsidy over 40 years to voters, which would take place on March 9, 2004. Meanwhile, the Ellman Companies struggled to nail down agreements with the major retailers expected to anchor the Los Arcos Town Center project. After the city had initially ruled that the deal was an "administrative" act that could not be challenged by a ballot initiative, a judge found otherwise in October, and the city voted not to appeal the ruling on the same margin by which it had approved the deal.

As 2004 began, the future of the Los Arcos site—which one Arizona Republic article declared "the most divisive piece of property in Scottsdale history"—hung on the fate of the March 9 vote. However, just weeks before election day, Steve Ellman scrapped the Los Arcos Town Center project.

== SkySong ==
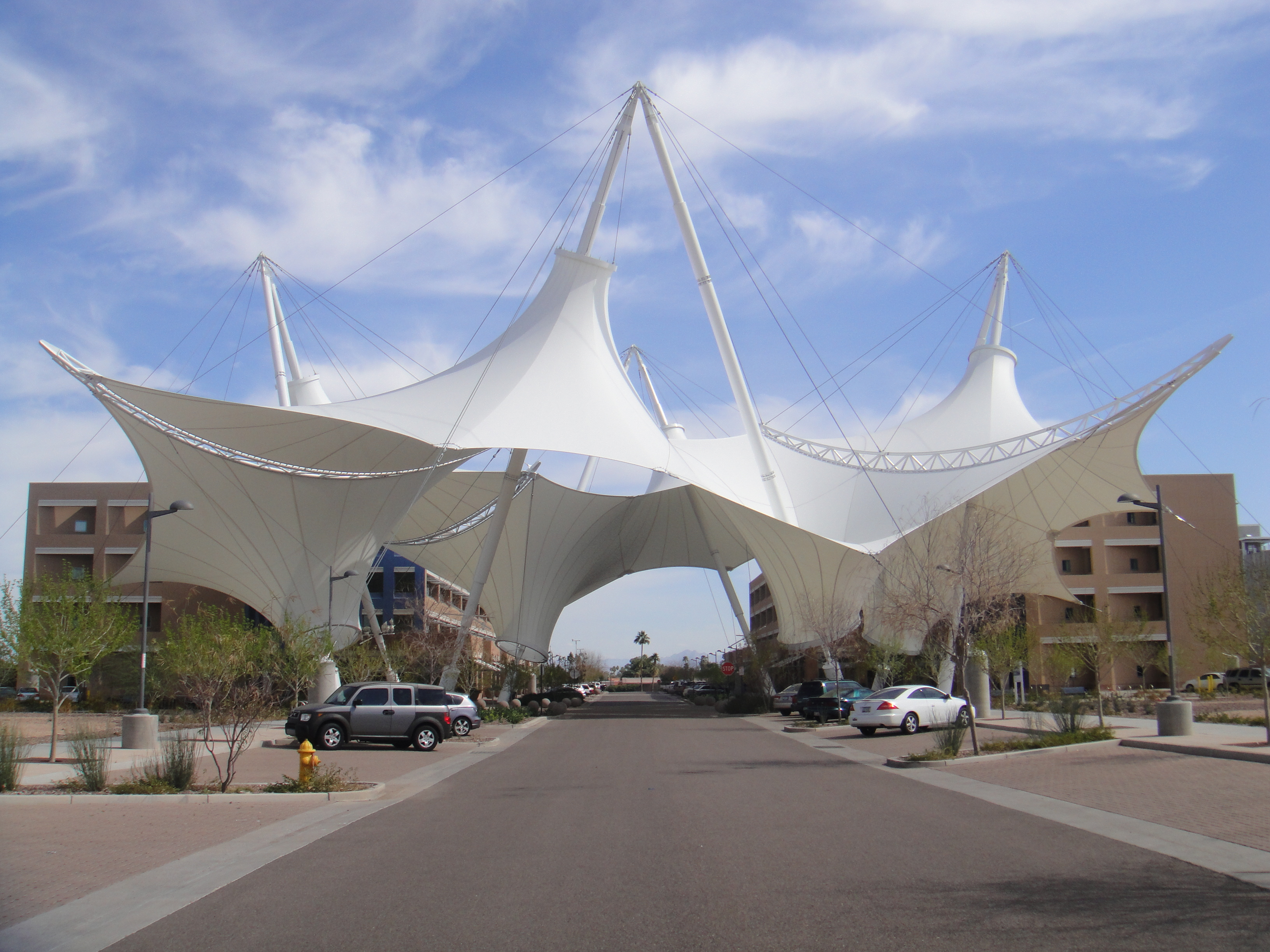
SkySong as it appeared in 2010, with the first two buildings complete

In 2004, the Ellman Companies, the city of Scottsdale and the ASU Foundation, the philanthropic arm of Arizona State University, reached a deal: Ellman would sell the land for $41.5 million to the foundation, which would convey the land to the city and then build a technology and innovation center on the property. ASU had been interested in locating a facility on the property since 2003. It was to be known as the ASU Scottsdale Center for New Technology and Innovation and was forecast to generate 4,000 jobs. According to the deal, the city would retain 1.5 acres (0.61 ha) of the 42-acre (17 ha) parcel for its own future use.

Three concepts for the development were presented in early 2005. The winning proposal featured a large set of shade sails, dubbed SkySong, and a design inspired by La Rambla in Barcelona. The site was rezoned to permit taller buildings by a unanimous city council vote in June. Opposition by residents to the design of the shade sculpture led to the developers revising the design to cover a smaller area. The center formally adopted the SkySong name in 2006, and the first two office buildings on the property opened in 2008.

Construction of additional office buildings accelerated in the 2010s. SkySong 3 was completed in 2015, and increased demand led to the construction of SkySong 4 shortly thereafter. SkySong 5 was completed in 2019. SkySong 6, a six-story 340,000-square-foot (32,000 m^{2}) office building fronting Scottsdale Road, is planned and set to bring the total square footage of the complex to over 1,000,000 square feet (93,000 m^{2}); after COVID-19-induced delays, as of 2022, construction was dependent on leases being signed for a portion of the space.

Notable tenants of the complex include Oracle Corporation, Groupon, Limelight Networks, and the Banner Innovation Group subsidiary of Banner Health. The university maintains offices and a business incubator in the center. In addition to offices, a hotel, a 325-unit apartment complex, and restaurants are also part of the development.
