= Foothills (Fort Collins, Colorado) =

The Shops at Foothills
- Location: Fort Collins, Colorado, U.S.
- Coordinates: 40°32′36″N 105°4′25″W
- Address: 215 East Foothills Parkway
- Opened: November 1, 1973; 53 years ago
- Developer: EverWest (Everitt Enterprises and Westcor)
- Manager: Alberta Development Partners, LLC
- Floor area: 620,000 square feet (58,000 m^{2})

The Shops at Foothills, formerly Foothills Fashion Mall and Foothills Mall, is a shopping mall in Fort Collins, Colorado, United States. Opened in 1972, the mall was developed by EverWest, a joint venture of Everitt Enterprises and Westcor. Original tenants of the mall included Sears, May-Daniels & Fisher, and The Denver Dry Goods Company.

After years of decline, it was redeveloped extensively in 2015 to include elements of an outdoor shopping mall. The mall's anchor stores are H&M, and Dick's Sporting Goods. Other major tenants include Nordstrom Rack, Ross Dress for Less, and a Cinemark movie theater. There is one former anchor store that was once a Macy's. The mall is owned and managed by Alberta Development Partners, LLC.

== History ==
Leslie G. Everett, owner of Fort Collins, Colorado real estate company Everitt Enterprises, purchased the land that would become Foothills Fashion Mall in 1968 with the intention of developing it for commercial and residential use. At the time, the city of Fort Collins was undergoing significant population growth, which led to an increased demand for retail. Sears, which at the time had only a catalog merchant store downtown, was looking to build a full-scale department store along College Avenue (U.S. Highway 287). The Denver Dry Goods Company (The Denver), a department store based in Denver, Colorado, had also expressed interest in opening a store along College Avenue. At the time of purchase, Everitt Enterprises was not considering development of a shopping mall, but agreed to the concept after a meeting with representatives of The Denver. Due to difficulty in obtaining sufficient resources with the mall, Everitt Enterprises formed a joint venture with Phoenix, Arizona-based shopping mall developer Westcor, to begin construction in 1972.

EverWest announced in September 1972 that Foothills Fashion Mall would be completed in 1973. The mall would be at the southeastern corner of College Avenue and Swallow Road, and would contain over 50 stores. Sears and The Denver would serve as the anchor stores along with May-Daniels & Fisher (May D&F), also based out of Denver. Outparcels of the mall would be occupied by a movie theater, grocery store, drugstore, and bank. The three stores had representatives present at the groundbreaking, which began on September 22, 1972.

Sears and The Denver were the first two stores to open for business, respectively opening on August 9 and 10, 1973. Stores opened incrementally between October 1973 and February 1974, the last being the May D&F department store. By the mall's one-year anniversary in late 1974, all but seven of the fifty-three retail spots within the mall were occupied, and the overall mall had more than 450 employees. In response to mall traffic, the city of Fort Collins widened College Avenue and installed a traffic signal at the mall's entrance. Gary Haxtun, then-vice president of Everitt Enterprises, noted that at the time, nearly 25 percent of mall customers were from Wyoming.

A fourth anchor, J. C. Penney, was added to the mall in 1980. An expansion begun in 1987 and completed in 1989 expanded the mall from 450,000 square feet (42,000 m^{2}) to 600,000 square feet (56,000 m^{2}); in addition, The Denver closed in 1987 and was sold to Mervyn's which opened in 1989. May D&F was then sold to Foley's in 1993. By 2001, the mall consisted of over 600,000 square feet (56,000 m^{2}) of retail space and was the biggest in northern Colorado. Mervyn's closed in 2005 and J. C. Penney moved to a larger store in 2006, while Foley's was sold to Macy's. The vacancies of two anchors, combined with deferred maintenance of the building, led to a severe increase in vacancy throughout. General Growth Properties had bought the mall in 2003 and had announced renovation plans following the closure of J. C. Penney and Mervyn's, but these plans were complicated by a difficulty in finding suitable tenants, along with General Growth's bankruptcy filing in 2010. Alberta Development Partners bought the mall from General Growth in 2012 and planned to redevelop it as well. Renovation had begun in late 2014 following the closure of Sears. Renovation included demolition of portions of the mall, along with the addition of Cinemark movie theater, Nordstrom Rack, and Ross Dress for Less. New stores continued to open throughout 2016, including multiple restaurants and H&M. By this point, the mall was officially renamed The Shops at Foothills. Also included in the renovation were apartments. Despite the renovation, the revived mall felt short of sales expectations and was only 77 percent leased by 2018, but mall developers noted that stores were still being opened at the time. One year later, the mall remained only three-quarters occupied, with developers noting that one factor was the existence of tenants that do not generate significant tax revenues, such as yoga studios and nail salons.

In December 2020, ownership failed to make their loan payment and the mall was set for foreclosure in April 2021. Retail Developer McWhinney, who had been involved in numerous retail developments in the Northern Colorado area, agreed to purchase the mall in February 2021, with plans to redevelop the mall.

On December 12, 2022, it was announced that Macy's would be closing in March 2023.
