= FlatIron Crossing =

Shopping mall in Broomfield, Colorado, US

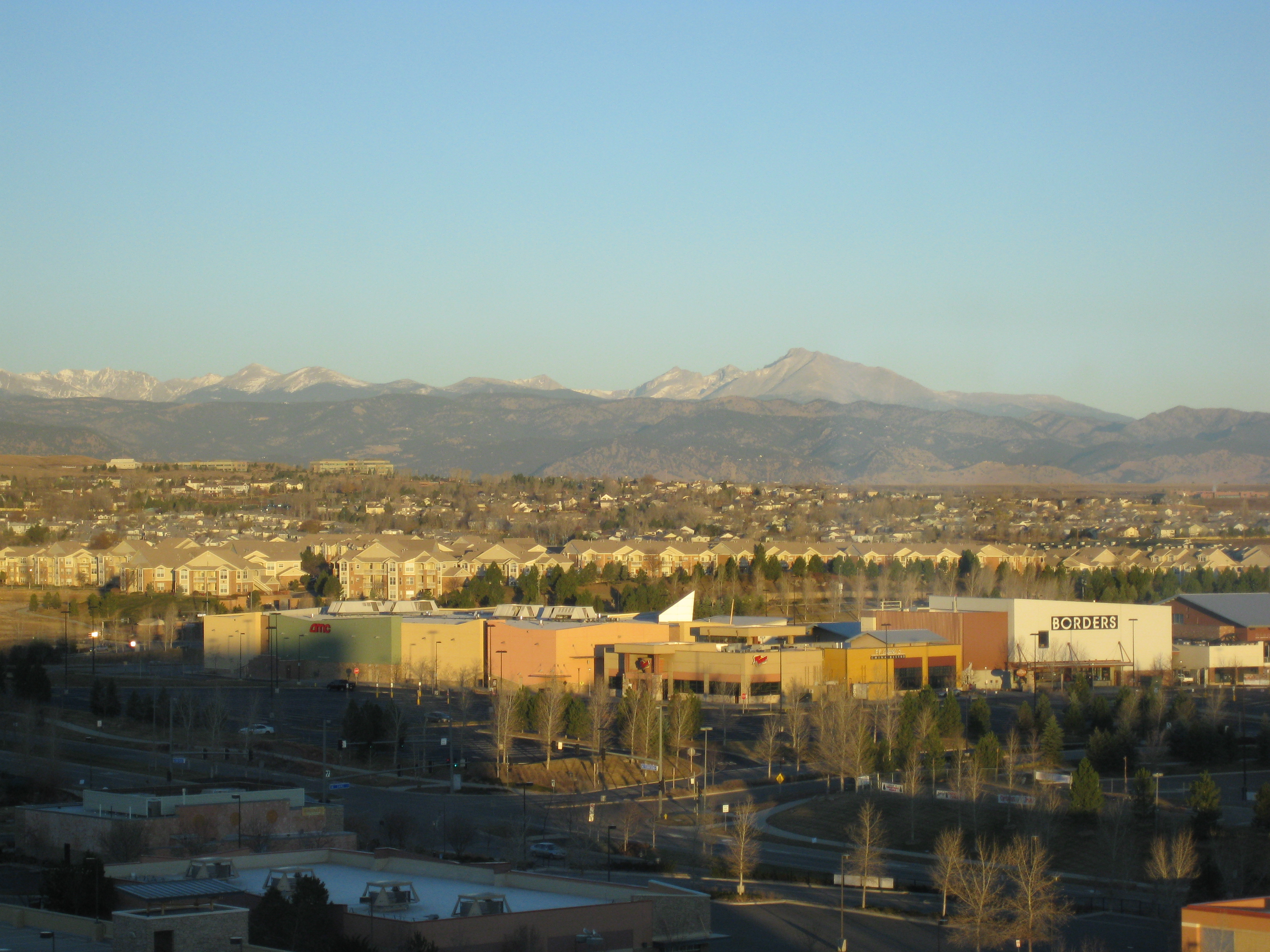
- The Village at FlatIron Crossing Mall as seen in 2008
- Location: Broomfield, Colorado, United States
- Coordinates: 39.933°N 105.133°W
- Address: One West FlatIron Crossing Drive, Suite 1083
- Opened: August 11, 2000; 26 years ago
- Developer: Westcor
- Manager: Macerich
- Owner: Macerich
- Num. of stores: 198
- Num. of anchor tenants: 7
- Floor area: 1,467,566 sq ft (136,341.3 m^{2})
- Floors: 2 (3rd floor offices in Dick's Sporting Goods)
- Website: flatironcrossing.com

FlatIron Crossing is an enclosed shopping mall in Broomfield, Colorado anchored by Macy's, Dillard's, and Dick's Sporting Goods. An outdoor lifestyle center, named FlatIron Village; extends out of the mall's southern side and is anchored by a 14-screen AMC Theatres cinema and several restaurants. Other stores at the mall include Crate & Barrel, White House Black Market, Cotton On, Williams Sonoma, Apple, Pottery Barn, and MAC Cosmetics.

== History ==
FlatIron Crossing opened on August 11, 2000 after two years of construction, anchored by Lord & Taylor, Galyan's, Foley's, Dillard's, and Nordstrom. The mall's hybrid layout, with an outdoor extension attached to an indoor mall, was unique at opening and was one of the first of its kind in the United States.

In 2001, a propane-powered shuttle bus began circulating passengers free of charge between FlatIron Crossing and its adjacent shopping centers, Flatiron Marketplace and MainStreet at Flatiron. Funded by the Flatiron Improvement District sales tax surcharge, it stopped at 14 points along a 2.6 miles (4.2 km) route used only by pedestrians, bicycles, and the shuttle itself. It ceased operation in 2008, and in 2015 portions of the shuttle route were repurposed for the bikeway constructed as part of the U.S. Route 36 express lanes project.

Although the mall was recorded as having among the highest sales per square foot in the country as of March 31, 2017, the mall had for many years after opening encountered several setbacks, particularly with the outdoor village area. The outdoor village area was originally populated by independent boutiques, a number of which were poached from nearby Boulder's Pearl Street Mall, alongside a Borders bookstore and several restaurants. An AMC cinema meant to anchor the Village opened more than a year late, leaving the outdoor area without a major draw and causing a third of those independent retailers to leave. Structural issues caused by shifting soil beneath the Village required additional tenants to leave soon after, rendering the outdoor mall partially vacant. Many of those vacant buildings were demolished not soon after, while the bankruptcy of Borders left the outdoor mall with only the cinema and a handful of restaurants. A planned redevelopment of the village was floated in 2008, including a 140-room hotel, but was canceled in favor of a more modest overhaul completed in 2013. In September 2022, demolition of a section of the Village began as part of a $400 million redevelopment plan that will transform the mall's parking lots into mixed-use retail, restaurants, office, residential, a hotel, and parks, while complimenting the rest of the shopping center.

Galyan's was acquired by Dick's Sporting Goods in 2004, leading Dick's to rebrand the FlatIron Crossing store to their own nameplate. Foley's was converted to Macy's in 2006, as a result of the merger between Foley's parent company May Department Stores and Macy's parent Federated Department Stores. In 2005, Lord & Taylor was shuttered as part of a chain-wide market repositioning. By 2009, the former Lord & Taylor structure was redeveloped into three separate stores, Forever 21 on the upper level, and Ultimate Electronics and The Container Store splitting the lower level. Ultimate Electronics shuttered along with the chain in 2011.

On May 7, 2020, Nordstrom, which also maintains additional outposts in both nearby Cherry Creek and Lone Tree, announced plans to shutter along with several additional locations as a direct result of pulling back due to the COVID-19 pandemic. The space which originally had been Nordstrom is set to be renovated into commercial office space as part of a $400 million project that will feature additional retail, restaurants, offices, multi-family developments, a hotel, parks, and a parking structure, while keeping the indoor mall and the southern portion of the Village intact.

By 2023, since the COVID-19 lockdowns, Flatiron Crossing has also announced several newest additions, among them are Windsor, Lovisa, JD Sports, Cotton On, and Tempur-Pedic

== Anchor stores ==
- Macy's
- Dillard's
- Dick's Sporting Goods
- The Container Store
- AMC Theatres
- Crate & Barrel

== Former anchor stores ==
- Lord & Taylor - closed 2005
- Ultimate Electronics - closed 2011
- Borders - closed 2011
- Nordstrom - closed 2020
- Forever 21 - closed 2025
