= NorthPark Mall (Iowa) =

Shopping mall in Davenport, Iowa, United States

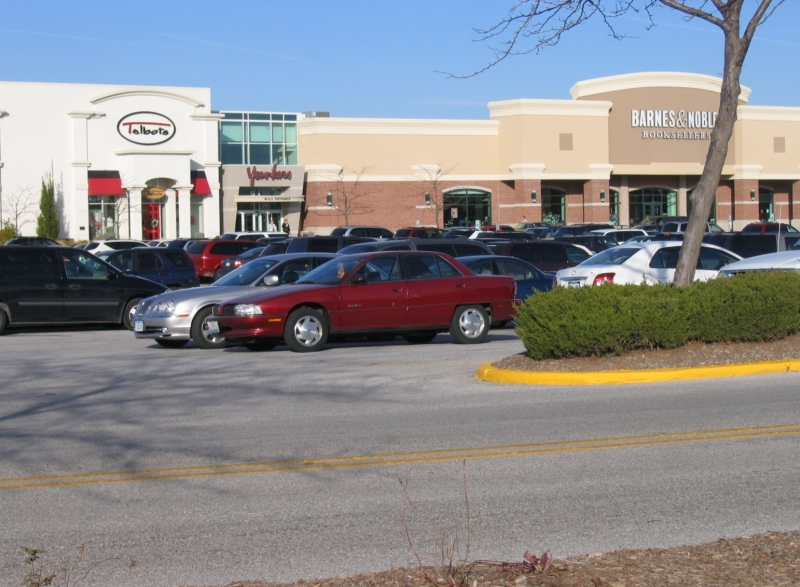
- The front of NorthPark
- Location: Davenport, Iowa, United States
- Coordinates: 41.563130°N 90.574937°W
- Address: 320 West Kimberly Road
- Opened: July 11, 1973; 53 years ago
- Developer: General Growth Properties
- Manager: Macerich
- Owner: Macerich
- Num. of stores: 160
- Num. of anchor tenants: 5 (3 open, 2 vacant)
- Floor area: 1,074,000 sq ft (99,800 m^{2})
- Floors: 1 (2 in JCPenney)
- Public transit: Davenport CitiBus
- Website: north-park-mall-ia.com

NorthPark Mall is a shopping mall located in Davenport, Iowa. As Davenport is part of the Quad Cities (Davenport and Bettendorf in Iowa; East Moline, Moline, and Rock Island in Illinois) the mall serves the population of these cities. The mall is located northwest of the intersection of U.S. Highways 61 (Welcome Way) and 6 (Kimberly Road) at 320 West Kimberly Road. NorthPark Mall is one of two shopping malls operating in the Quad Cities area, the other being SouthPark Mall in Moline, Illinois. Both malls were once managed by Macerich; while NorthPark Mall is still managed by Macerich, in 2025 Kohan took over SouthPark Mall. The mall's anchor stores are Dillard's, JCPenney and Von Maur. There are 2 vacant anchor stores that were once Sears and Younkers. It is the third largest shopping mall in the state of Iowa. NorthPark Mall offers educational activities and games for children, a live piano music weekend in April, and other regular events.

== History ==
NorthPark Mall opened on July 11, 1973. The original anchors were JCPenney, Younkers, and Montgomery Ward, which closed when the chain went out of business in 2001 and was replaced by Dillard's two years later. A multimillion-dollar expansion in 1981 brought Sears and Petersen Harned Von Maur to the mall. Today, the mall can house up to 160 shops and five anchor stores, but the hall leading to Von Maur and the former Sears anchor has become sparsely populated. NorthPark has been remodeled and renovated several times through the years.

On April 18, 2018, it was announced that Younkers would be closing as parent company The Bon-Ton was going out of business. The store closed on August 29, 2018.

On May 31, 2018, Sears announced that its store would also be closing as part of a plan to close 78 stores nationwide. The store closed on September 2, 2018.
