= Omniplan (architects) =

American architecture company

Omniplan, Inc.
- Formerly: Harrell and Hamilton
- Industry: Architecture
- Founded: 1956
- Founder: George Harrell and E. G. Hamilton
- Website: www.omniplan.com

OMNIPLAN, founded by George Harrell and Earle Grady ("EG") Hamilton, and formerly known as Harrell & Hamilton, was established in 1956 to provide service and design in architecture, interior architecture, and planning. The majority of their work has been focused on large-scale retail, corporate and commercial office buildings, mixed-use projects and university facilities. With a staff of more than 50 people in offices in Dallas and Phoenix, OMNIPLAN provides design services to clients nationwide.

== Projects ==
=== NorthPark Center ===
NorthPark Center is a 2,000,000 sq ft (190,000 m^{2}) shopping mall, which has been expanded several times since opening in 1965. NorthPark was the first shopping center to be constructed using one major building material and to initiate a policy of controlled signage. The complex was the prototype for enclosed malls and received the Dallas Chapter AIA Award of the Decade for its design and impact on the city of Dallas. NorthPark also received the DAIA’s Design Award in 1966 and the TSA Citation Design Award in 1967. In 1992, the project was honored with the DAIA 25-Year Award for Design Excellence.

=== Rayzor Ranch ===
Rayzor Ranch, located in Denton, Texas, is a mixed-use development totaling more than 1,000,000 square feet (93,000 m^{2}) of retail and office space. The Town Center is one component of a site master plan, which includes single- and multi-family residential buildings, a multi-screen cinema, hotel, outdoor amphitheater, community buildings, and multiple acres of dedicated greenspace. Its name derives from the family of J. Newton Rayzor, a Texas philanthropist.

=== SanTan Village ===
Located in Gilbert, Arizona, SanTan Village is a multi-purpose center containing retail, office, entertainment, and other commercial uses. With more than a dozen traditional indoor malls sprinkled around metropolitan Phoenix, SanTan Village houses an all outdoor regional retail center highlighted by department stores and indoor food court.

=== Fujitsu America ===
Fujitsu's 100-acre site in Richardson, Texas, accommodates a phaseable campus of office, research, manufacturing and assembly buildings. The construction of the initial phase consisted of 90,000 sq ft (8,400 m^{2}) of office and 280,000 sq ft of manufacturing, assembly and support functions. The complex, designed for Taivan Corporation, also has a cafeteria, a large data center and fitness facilities and includes robotic and linear assembly systems. In 1991, the facility received a Design Award from the Dallas Chapter of the American Institute of Architects.

=== Andrew Corporation ===
Major functions of the Andrew Corporation's 100,000 sq ft (9,300 m^{2}) facility in Richardson, Texas, include office space, electronic test and assembly, training and support areas.

=== University of Texas Southwestern Medical Center ===
==== Building K Renovation ====
This 30,000 sq ft (2,800 m^{2}) renovation of Building K involved the demolition of existing labs and offices to provide new labs, offices, conference centers, a break room and restrooms for the Biochemistry Department at the UT Southwestern Medical School.

==== Phases 2, 4, and 5 ====
Omniplan is responsible for the following three phases:

===== Phase 2: Hamon Biomedical Research Center =====
This seven-story, 488,000 sq ft (45,300 m^{2}) biomedical research building is part of a four-phase integrated research complex of the University of Texas Southwestern Medical Center at Dallas. Omniplan Architects collaborated with Edward Larrabee Barnes Architects in New York City and Earl Walls of San Diego on laboratory design. Included in this project is a 31,000 sq ft (2,900 m^{2}) thermal energy plant and 134,000 sq ft (12,400 m^{2}) of parking.

===== Phase 4: Pickens Biomedical Research Center =====
As the fourth installation in a six-part master plan for the north campus of The University of Texas Southwestern Medical Center at Dallas, a new biomedical research center had been planned for some time. However, certain variables made it difficult to identify which users would be occupying the space. Rather than designing and building out the space based largely on client speculation, which would likely have resulted in numerous change orders and cost overruns, Omniplan developed a plan to design and bid the project in two stages. First, Omniplan designed an enclosed structural shell for the 16-story structure, which could easily be finished out at a later date. Then, once the school had identified its users, Omniplan was able to work directly with them to design an optimal interior, complete with a conference center and faculty and staff dining. In addition to the research facility, this project also encompasses underground and above-ground parking structures, a landscaped plaza, and expansion of the thermal energy plant.

===== Phase 5: NL Biomedical Research Center =====
The North Campus at the University of Texas Southwestern Medical Center at Dallas is master-planned as an 11-phase, integrated, urban, biomedical research complex. The campus is divided by a landscaped channel running from east to west through the middle of the site. Phases 1–4, including two designed by Omniplan, are situated on the south side of the canal. Omniplan is designing the fifth phase of the complex, the first building on the north side of the waterway. Phase 5 will set the organizational pattern and architectural language of the remaining six phases of the master plan.

The lab floors as well as the vertical circulation that connects them are organized to promote spontaneous collaboration and interaction between scientists. Each typical lab floor can accommodate up to eight principal researchers and their staff. And while some floors may initially house administrative and classroom areas, the modular design of the building and systems allow for easy conversion of the entire facility into research laboratories. The project is being designed to achieve LEED Silver Certification.

=== Dallas Holocaust and Human Rights Museum ===
The Dallas Holocaust and Human Rights Museum, in the West End district of downtown Dallas, was designed by Omniplan. The interior routes visitors through the museum's exhibition spaces in sequence, and the attached parking structure shares the dark brick exterior of the main building. The project received a 2022 AIA Dallas Built Design Honor Award.

== Awards ==
Omniplan has received numerous design awards over the course of its history, including:

- 2000: The firm received the Architecture Firm Award from the Texas Society of Architects, the highest honor the Society can bestow on a firm.
- 2003: Omniplan was presented with the Pinnacle Award and named Firm of the Year by the International Interior Design Association.
- 2022: The Dallas Holocaust and Human Rights Museum received an AIA Dallas Built Design Honor Award.
