= Eastland Mall (Evansville, Indiana) =

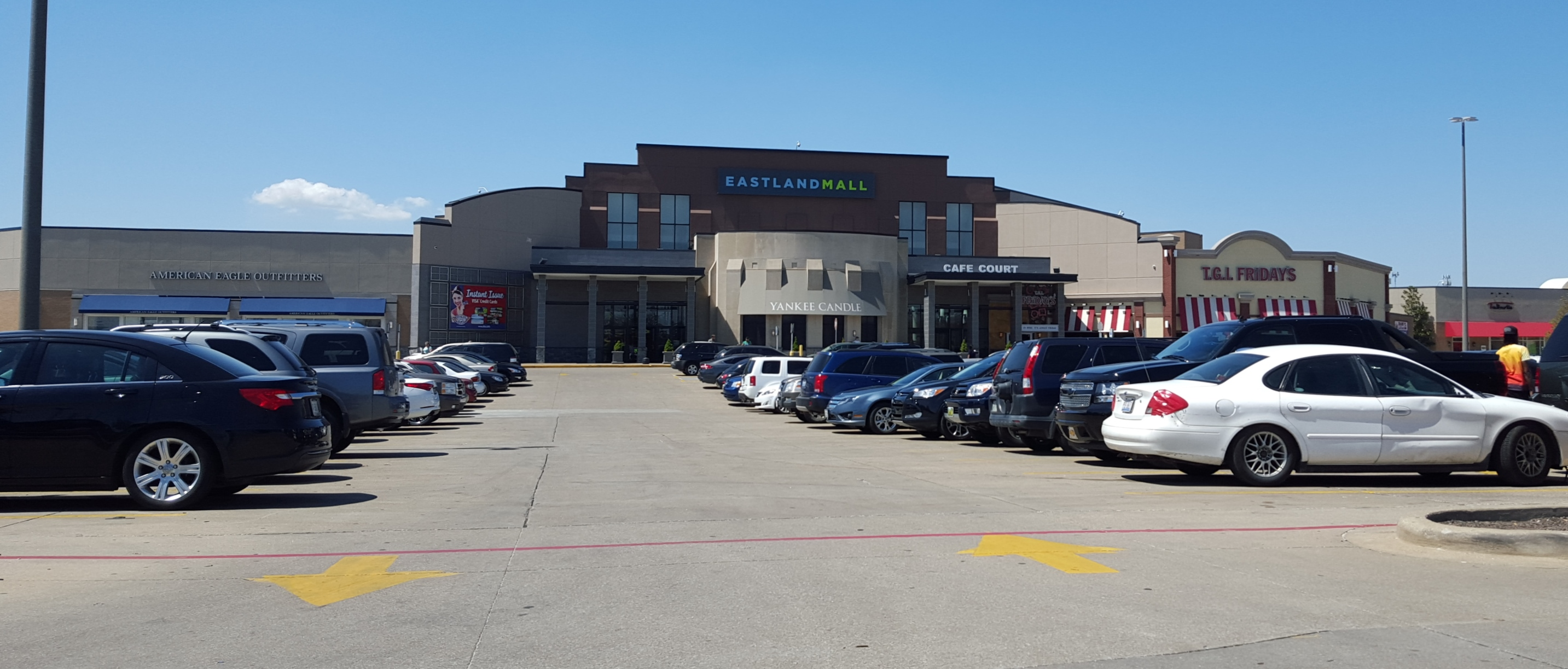
- Exterior view of Eastland Mall, January 2012
- Location: Evansville, Indiana, United States
- Coordinates: 37.98438°N 87.49564°W
- Opened: August 1981
- Developer: General Growth Properties
- Manager: Macerich
- Owner: Macerich
- Num. of stores: 95
- Num. of anchor tenants: 3
- Floor area: 1,001,000 sq ft (93,000 m^{2}).
- Floors: 2
- Public transit: METS
- Website: shopeastlandmall.com

Eastland Mall is a regional shopping mall located on North Green River Road in Evansville, Indiana. It is operated by the Macerich, a group which owns and develops malls around the United States. The mall has 130 specialty stores, three department stores, and a food court with a variety of fast food eateries and a TGI Fridays restaurant. The anchor stores are Macy's, Dillard's, and JCPenney.

Sales per square foot in 2016 were $367, a decline from $402 in 2012. As the regional hub of the Illinois-Indiana-Kentucky Tri-State Area, retail sales per capita are 60% higher for Evansville than the state average and are the highest in the state. Total square footage for Eastland Mall is one million.

== History ==
The mall was originally developed by General Growth Properties, opening in August 1981. The original anchors were JCPenney, Ben Snyder's, and deJong's. Lazarus was added in August 1982. General Growth sold the mall as part of a larger portfolio of 19 centers to a passive institutional investor, Equitable Life Assurance Society in 1984. General Growth retained the management agreement for over the next decade.

Snyder's was acquired by Hess's in 1987 and assumed the Hess's nameplate in 1988. Hess's ran into financial difficulties a few years later, shuttering this store in 1993. The Famous-Barr division of May Company bought the closed anchor, demolished it and opened a new store on the same site in 1996. After the mall was acquired by a partnership of Simon Property Group and Macerich, it was expanded to provide a larger food court area and a carousel was installed. Simon assumed management at this time. In 2005, the vacant deJong's location was converted into various specialty stores.

On May 2, 2000, a TGI Fridays restaurant would officially open to the public at the mall.

Lazarus briefly adopted the Lazarus-Macy's moniker in 2003 before dropping the legacy Lazarus name in early 2005, becoming simply Macy's. After the Federated and May Company department store merger in 2005, the Famous-Barr site was closed in 2006 and sold to Dillard's. The latest center mall anchor renovated and opened in 2007. In late 2011 Simon and Macerich terminated their decade plus long multi-state partnership and distributed the remaining 11 properties, with Macerich receiving Eastland Mall and assuming management rights in January 2012.

In January 2017, The Limited announced they would be closing all of their 250 stores, including the one at Eastland Mall. In July 2017, Gymboree announced they will close 350 outlet locations, including the one at Eastland Mall.

== See also ==
- List of shopping malls in the United States
