= Flagstaff Mall =

Shopping area in Arizona

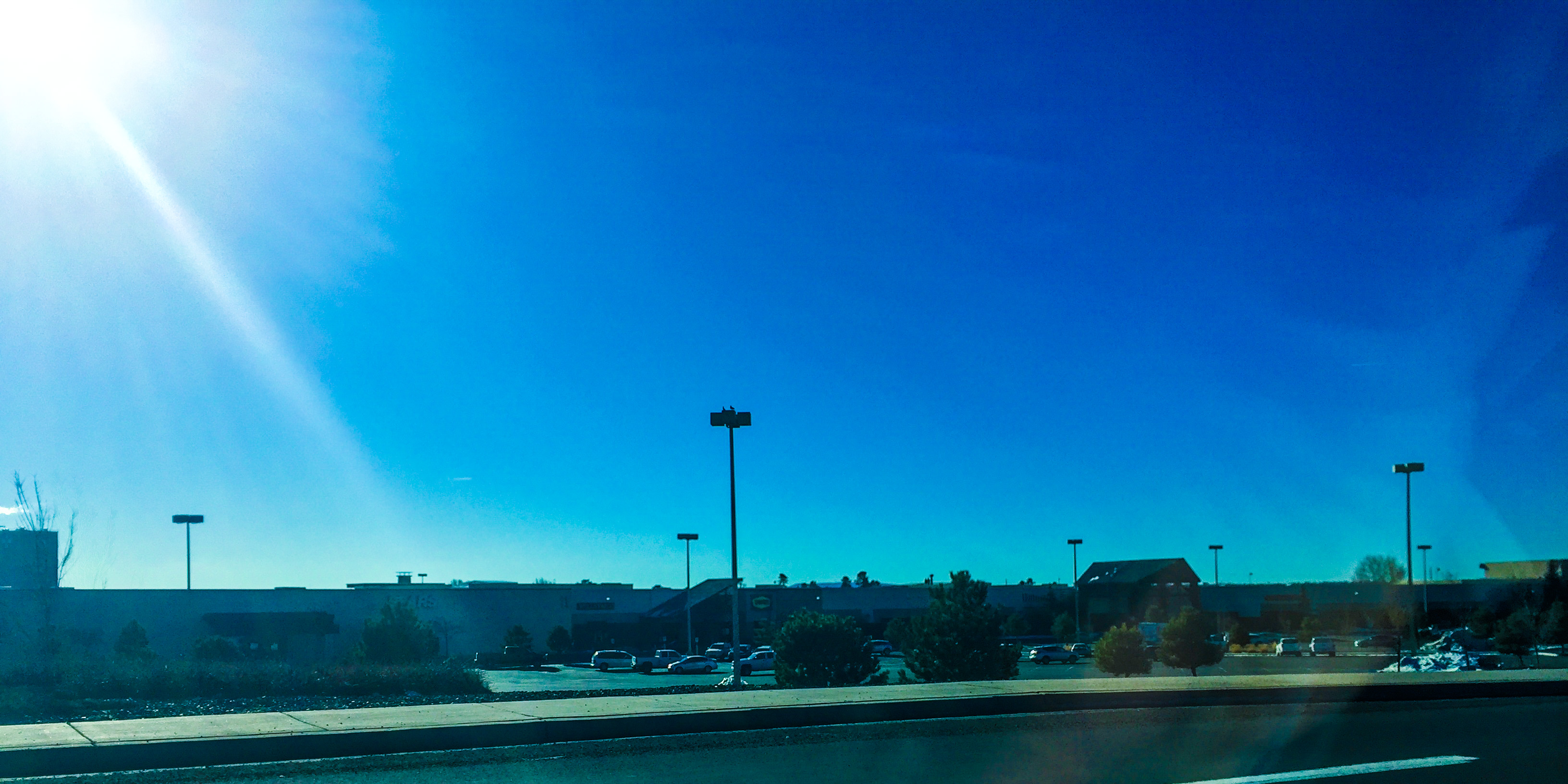
- Flagstaff Mall in January 2018
- Location: Flagstaff, Arizona, United States
- Coordinates: 35°13′23″N 111°34′53″W
- Opened: 1979
- Developer: Westcor
- Manager: Cypress Equities
- Owner: Cypress Equities
- Architect: Architectonics Inc.
- Num. of stores: 62
- Num. of anchor tenants: 3 (All Open)
- Floor area: 347,000 sq ft (32,200 m^{2})
- Floors: 1
- Website: flagstaffmall.com

Flagstaff Mall is a regional shopping mall located in Flagstaff, Arizona, is operated by Cypress Equities. The mall opened in 1979, and is anchored by Dillard's, JCPenney, and Hobby Lobby.

== History ==
Flagstaff Mall opened in 1979, developed by Phoenix-based real estate company Westcor. Architectonics Inc. was the architect, The Law Company Inc. was general contractor. JCPenney left its downtown location to join the mall, while Sears moved from the smaller Flagstaff Plaza Mall. Dillard's joined the shopping center in 1986.

In 2015, Sears Holdings spun off 235 of its properties, including the Sears at Flagstaff Mall, into Seritage Growth Properties.

On August 22, 2018, it was announced that Sears would be closing as part of a plan to close 46 stores nationwide. The store closed in November 2018.

In 2020, the shopping center opened a Hobby Lobby, Starbucks and an entertainment wing for indoor and outdoor use.
