= Westcor =

Shopping mall developer

- Company type: Subsidiary (2002-2012)
- Industry: Shopping mall developer
- Founded: 1964; 62 years ago
- Defunct: 2012; 14 years ago
- Headquarters: Phoenix, Arizona, United States
- Area served: Southwestern United States
- Parent: Macerich (2002-2012)
- Website: Defunct

Westcor was a Phoenix-based developer of shopping malls and later a subsidiary of The Macerich Company. It was founded in 1964 by entrepreneurs Rusty Lyon & Bob Teske. In 2002, the company was acquired by Macerich for $1.5 billion, after which it continued to operate as a separate, wholly owned division until its dissolution in 2012. Despite these changes, Macerich continues to operate many of Westcor's former properties including Scottsdale Fashion Square, Arrowhead Towne Center, and Kierland Commons.

== Properties developed ==
Mall	Location	Year built
Arrowhead Towne Center	Glendale, Arizona	1993
Chandler Fashion Center	Chandler, Arizona	2001
Foothills Mall	Fort Collins, Colorado	1972
Flagstaff Mall	Flagstaff, Arizona	1979
Flatiron Crossing	Broomfield, Colorado	2000
Kierland Commons	Phoenix, Arizona	2000
La Encantada	Catalina Foothills, Arizona	2003
Los Arcos Mall	Scottsdale, Arizona	1969
Market at Estrella Falls	Goodyear, Arizona	2008
Metrocenter Mall	Phoenix, Arizona	1973
Orchards Mall	Benton Harbor, Michigan	1979
Paradise Valley Mall	Phoenix, Arizona	1978
Prescott Gateway Mall	Prescott, Arizona	2002
Promenade at Casa Grande	Casa Grande, Arizona	2007
SanTan Village	Gilbert, Arizona	2007
Scottsdale 101	Scottsdale, Arizona	2003
Scottsdale Fashion Square (Enclosed)	Scottsdale, Arizona	1991
Superstition Springs Center	Mesa, Arizona	1990
The Crossroads	Portage, Michigan	1980
The Marketplace At Flagstaff	Flagstaff, Arizona	2007
Westridge Mall	Phoenix, Arizona	1981
