= Chandler Fashion Center =

Shopping center in Arizona

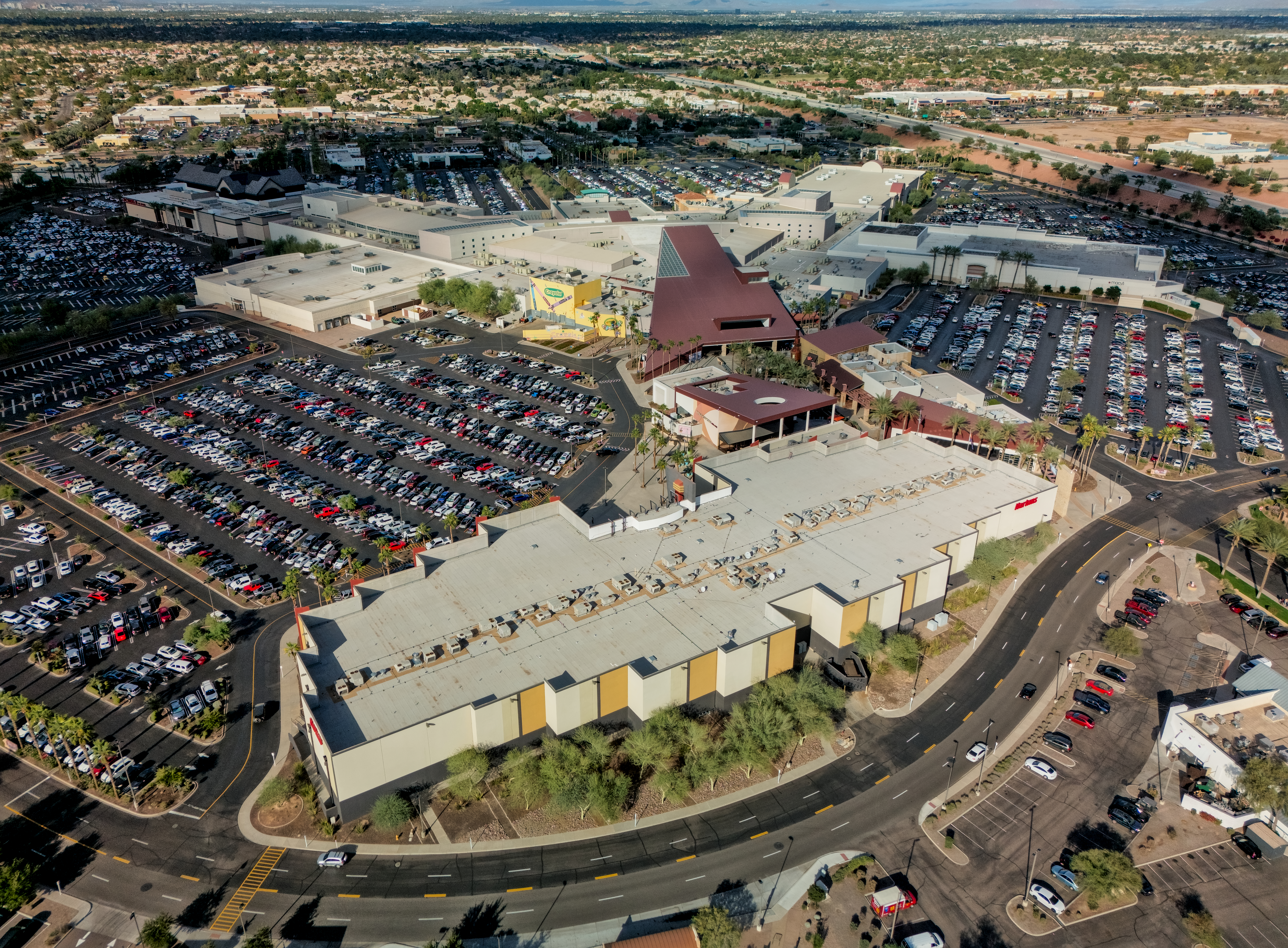
- Chandler Fashion Center in 2023
- Location: Chandler, Arizona, US
- Coordinates: 33°18′05″N 111°53′55″W
- Opened: October 19, 2001; 25 years ago
- Developer: Westcor
- Manager: Macerich
- Owner: Macerich
- Num. of stores: 220+
- Floor area: 1,300,000 sq ft (120,000 m^{2})
- Floors: 2
- Parking: 6,200 spaces
- Website: Official Website

Chandler Fashion Center is a regional shopping center located in the city of Chandler, Arizona, and is the second largest mall in the Phoenix metropolitan area. The mall is owned by Macerich and was developed by Westcor a former subsidiary of Macerich. The mall is located on the northwest corner of the AZ Loop 101 (Price) and AZ Loop 202 (SanTan) but can also be accessed from Chandler Boulevard. Chandler Fashion Center serves as a transit center for Valley Metro Bus.

Sales at Chandler Fashion Center are more than $600 per square foot, which is well above the national average of $392 per square foot.

== Layout ==
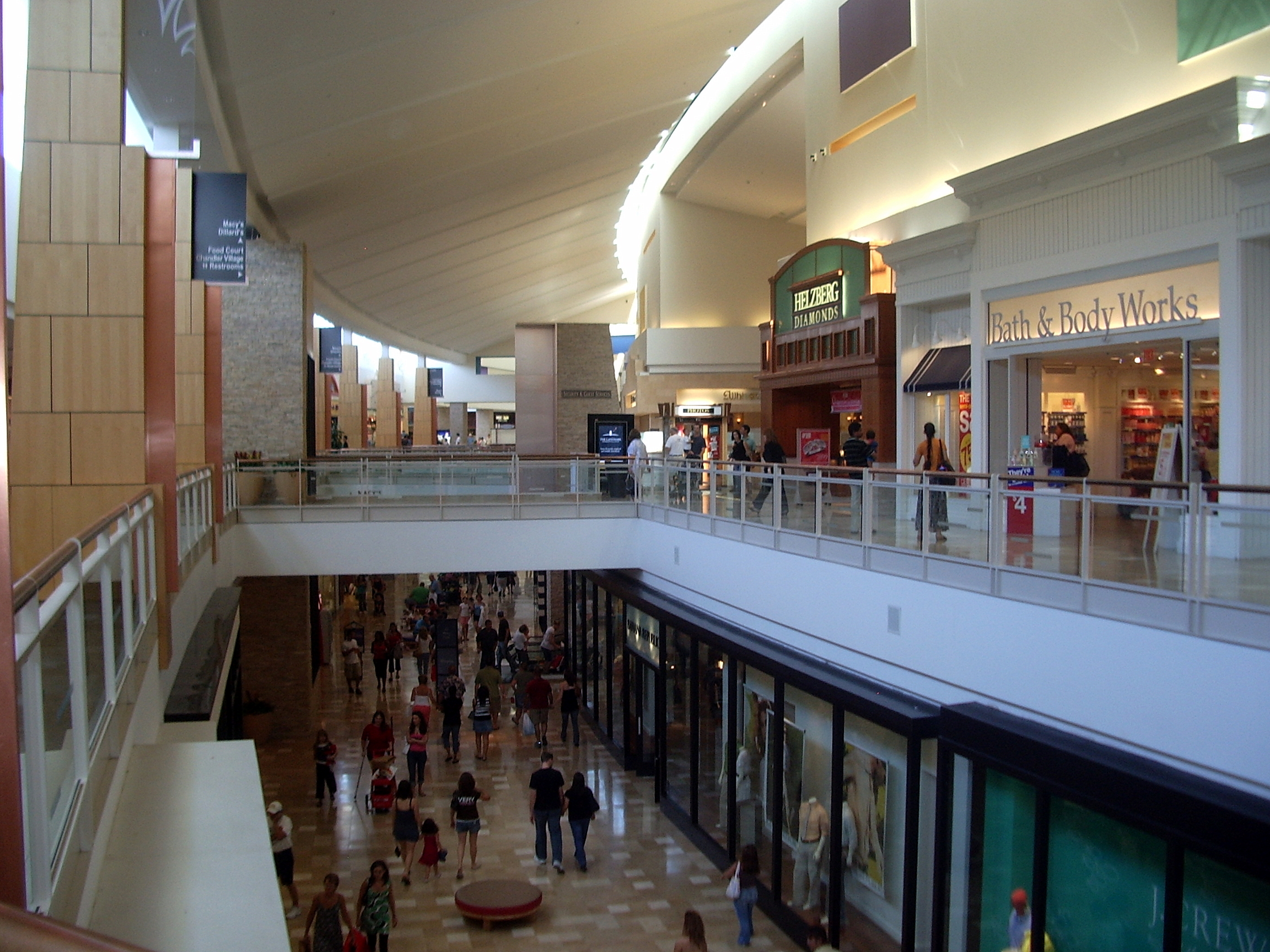
Chandler Fashion Center interior

Chandler Fashion Center is designed like the letter "A" with the food court as the top point. All of the indoor mall shops radiate out into three wings from the food court. The mall features stone columns, marble floors and large skylights all incorporated in a modern contemporary design. The mall is also a showcase of Arizona scenery courtesy of Arizona Highways. Large photographic murals of the Grand Canyon, Sedona and Arizona's Sonoran Desert are displayed on walls at the ends of each wing as well as certain outdoor entrances to the mall.

Adjacent to the food court entrance of the mall is an outdoor entertainment and dining plaza called The Village. The entertainment and dining options at The Village include the Harkins Theatres, Escape the Room, and Buffalo Wild Wings. A popular attraction of the outdoor plaza used to be the Dancing Waters fountain featuring a display of water, lights and music. The fountains were later demolished in the Summer of 2014 and renovated into a picnic area that featured patio seating, lawn areas, and a children's splash pad. Over the years, restaurants in The Village started to close such as Kona Grill, California Pizza Kitchen, Starbucks, Sir Vesa's, BJ's Restaurant & Brewhouse, and most recently The Old Spaghetti Factory. These closures left The Village at a 33% occupancy. Surrounding the mall there are many large retail centers including Chandler Festival, Chandler Gateway, Chandler Village Center and the Boulevard Shops at Chandler Fashion Center, all of which Westcor used to own.

== History ==
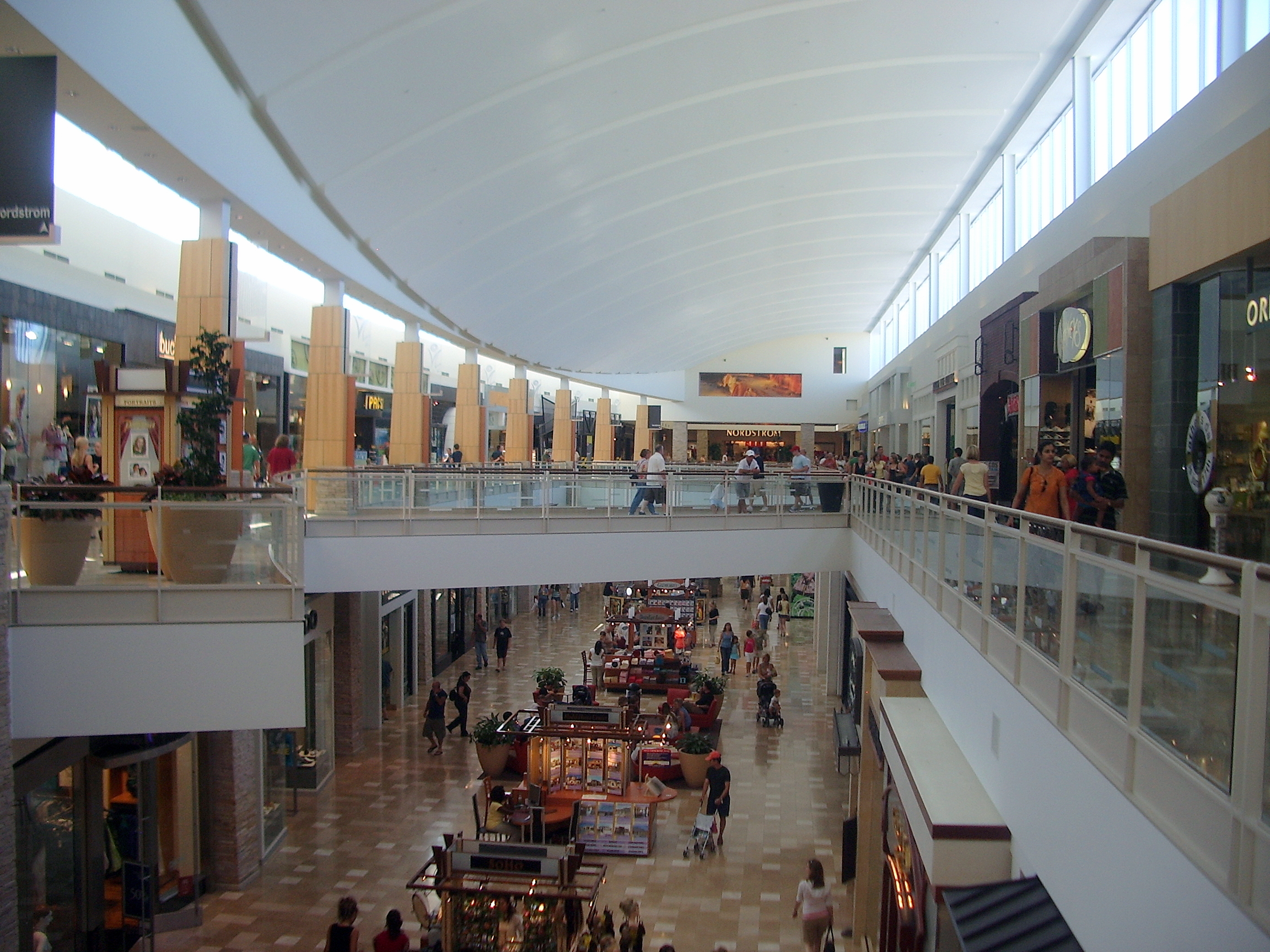
Scheels Corridor (original tenant Nordstrom pictured above)

The mall opened on October 19, 2001 with 229 stores and five anchors (Arizona's second Nordstrom, Sears, Dillard's, Robinsons-May and Harkins Theatres). Originally owned by Westcor, Chandler Fashion Center became part of The Macerich Company's portfolio in 2002. Arizona's first Apple Store opened in Chandler Fashion Center a few days after the mall's opening. This location moved elsewhere in the mall in 2016. A freestanding Best Buy was later built on the property. In 2006, Robinsons-May transitioned into a Macy's store. On January 5, 2011, a shootout occurred at the mall with the suspect and two officers, causing a lockdown immediately. The standoff lasted shortly, and police arrested the suspect after his surrender, no deaths or injuries were recorded. Sears announced in October 2018 that it would shutter as part of an ongoing decision to eliminate its traditional brick-and-mortar format. Several potential replacement tenants were reportedly in the midst of early on discussions. In 2019, the Crayola Experience opened near the food court. In May 2020, Nordstrom, which also retains an additional outpost in nearby Scottsdale, announced plans to shutter along with several additional locations as a direct result of pulling back due to the COVID-19 pandemic. In May 2021, it was announced that specialty sporting goods retailer Scheels would be reconstructing the original Nordstrom space. It also includes a 65-foot Ferris wheel, a 16,000-gallon saltwater aquarium featuring more than 600 fish, an arcade, sports simulators, a wildlife mountain, a restaurant, and a specialty candy shop. It opened as the first Scheels store in the state of Arizona on September 30, 2023.

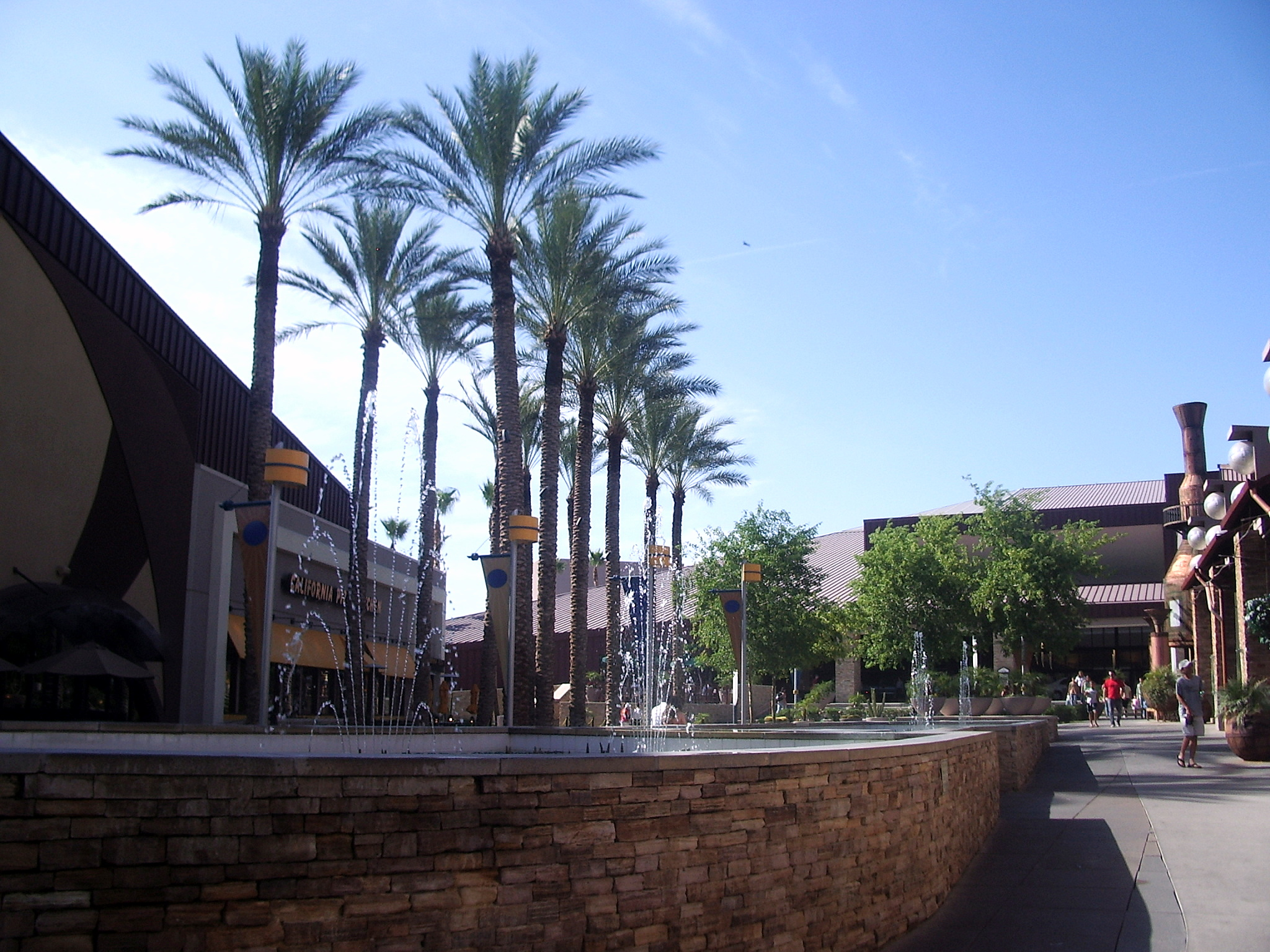
Chandler Village outdoor plaza, water feature has since been removed.

On February 8, 2025, Round1 Bowling & Arcade opened occupying the former Sears on the first floor. It was later announced that California based Seafood City's first location in Arizona would be occupying the second floor of the Sears. This Seafood City location is to include a 10,947 square foot (1017 m²) food hall with seating for 300 people. The 66,000 square foot (6131.6 m²) supermarket opened to the public on July 30, 2026 as the largest Seafood City in North America.
