= The Orchards Mall =

- Location: Benton Township, Michigan
- Coordinates: 42.0853°N 86.424°W
- Address: 1800 Pipestone Road
- Opened: October 24, 1979; 47 years ago
- Closed: 2024
- Developer: Westcor
- Owner: Durga LLC and Bedi & Associates LLC
- Num. of stores: See "Decline" section
- Floor area: 624,972 square feet
- Floors: 1
- Public transit: TCATA

The Orchards Mall was an enclosed mall in Benton Charter Township, Michigan, U.S., just outside Benton Harbor. Opened in 1979, the mall originally featured Sears and JCPenney as its anchor stores, with Elder-Beerman being added in the 1990s.

== History ==
Meyer C. Weiner Company first proposed a mall called Pipestone Mall in Benton Harbor in 1974. By March 1976, Hudson's had been rumored as a potential anchor store. Westcor acquired the land in August of the same year. The mall was part of a development along Pipestone Road near Interstate 94 which also comprised a strip mall anchored by a Kmart. By 1977, Sears and J. C. Penney had been confirmed as anchors, with negotiations underway for Carson Pirie Scott as the third anchor.

Orchards Mall was built in 1979 by Westcor. Opening for business in 1979, it featured J. C. Penney and Sears. Major tenants included Walgreens and York Steak House. Elder-Beerman was added in 1992 as the mall's third anchor store. Walgreens moved out of the Orchards Mall in the mid-1990s, with its store space remaining vacant until Jo-Ann Fabrics replaced it in the late-mid 2000s.

General Growth Properties became the mall's management in 1999. A year later, several new stores were added, including Bath & Body Works, while the Casual Corner and Finish Line, Inc. stores were remodeled. Benton Township approved a $111,000 tax cut to help attract new businesses. General Growth sold the mall to Sequoia Investments in 2002, at which point four more businesses opened, including a Subway and a Chinese eatery in the food court. KB Toys, an original tenant, closed in 2004. In 2004, Doctor ZZZZ'Z Mattress Center opened next to the food court. The space previously occupied by Ponderosa, which closed in 1997, became an Italian eatery in 2007. The same year, the former Subway became a local restaurant.

== Decline ==
Sears closed its store at the Orchards Mall on September 18, 2009, and remained vacant since. Overflow Church purchased the building in 2012 and intended to move into it. Elder-Beerman was converted to a Carson's in 2011. Sears returned to the mall in 2012 with its Sears Hometown format, a smaller-scale Sears store which sells major appliances and household hardware, in a spot vacated by an FYE music store. At the same time, the former Sears Auto Center on a mall outparcel was reopened as a local auto repair shop.

In 2014, the mall was put up for sale; Kohan Retail Investment Group purchased it on December 9. A 2016 news article lists 26 tenants.

Sears Hometown closed in July 2017. On January 31, 2018, The Bon-Ton announced that Carson's would be part of a plan to close 42 stores nationwide. The store was closed in April 2018. In June 2018, the water supply to the mall was cut off. The owner, Kohan Retail Investment Group had outstanding water bills. The mall was closed for a day because the occupancy to the mall had been revoked, although JCPenney remained open. The mall reopened the following day. It was sold to Durga LLC, on November 30, 2018, and management was taken over by Bedi & Associates LLC in June 2020.

On March 4, 2019, it was announced that JCPenney would also be closing as part of its planned closure of 27 stores nationwide. The JCPenney closed on July 5, 2019. In this same period, Rainbow Shops, one of the last three national tenants in the mall, closed. In August 2020, Bath & Body Works relocated to the Fairplain Plaza. In November 2021, Jo-Ann Fabrics announced it would be closing and relocating to the space next to the nearby Ollie's Bargain Outlet. The store opened in late July 2022.

As of December 2022, the three businesses remaining at the mall, two of which were the last remaining stores, were Doctor ZZZZ'Z; a discount furniture store, Open Box Outlet, which occupied the former Jo-Ann Fabrics space; and a US Postal Service (USPS) branch. Many storefronts in the mall had been vacant for 10+ years in December 2022. Doctor ZZZZ'Z announced its closure in January 2024, partially influenced by a December 2022 water main burst. In March 2025, a press release stated that the USPS branch, which closed temporarily in 2023, was approved to relocate to a separate building within the Orchards Mall/Fairplain Plaza retail complex. In August 2026, the USPS opted to close the branch rather than to relocate it.

As tenants vacated the mall, gulls became a nuisance; a bird deterrent was installed in summer 2023. As of 2024 tests were being run on the gulls that have died to determine cause of death.

In spite of the mall's deterioration, as of 2023 there were no plans to demolish the building; an April 2023 meeting between the owner and local officials indicated redevelopment plans. It was for sale again in 2026.
