= Scottsdale Fashion Square =

Shopping mall in Scottsdale, Arizona

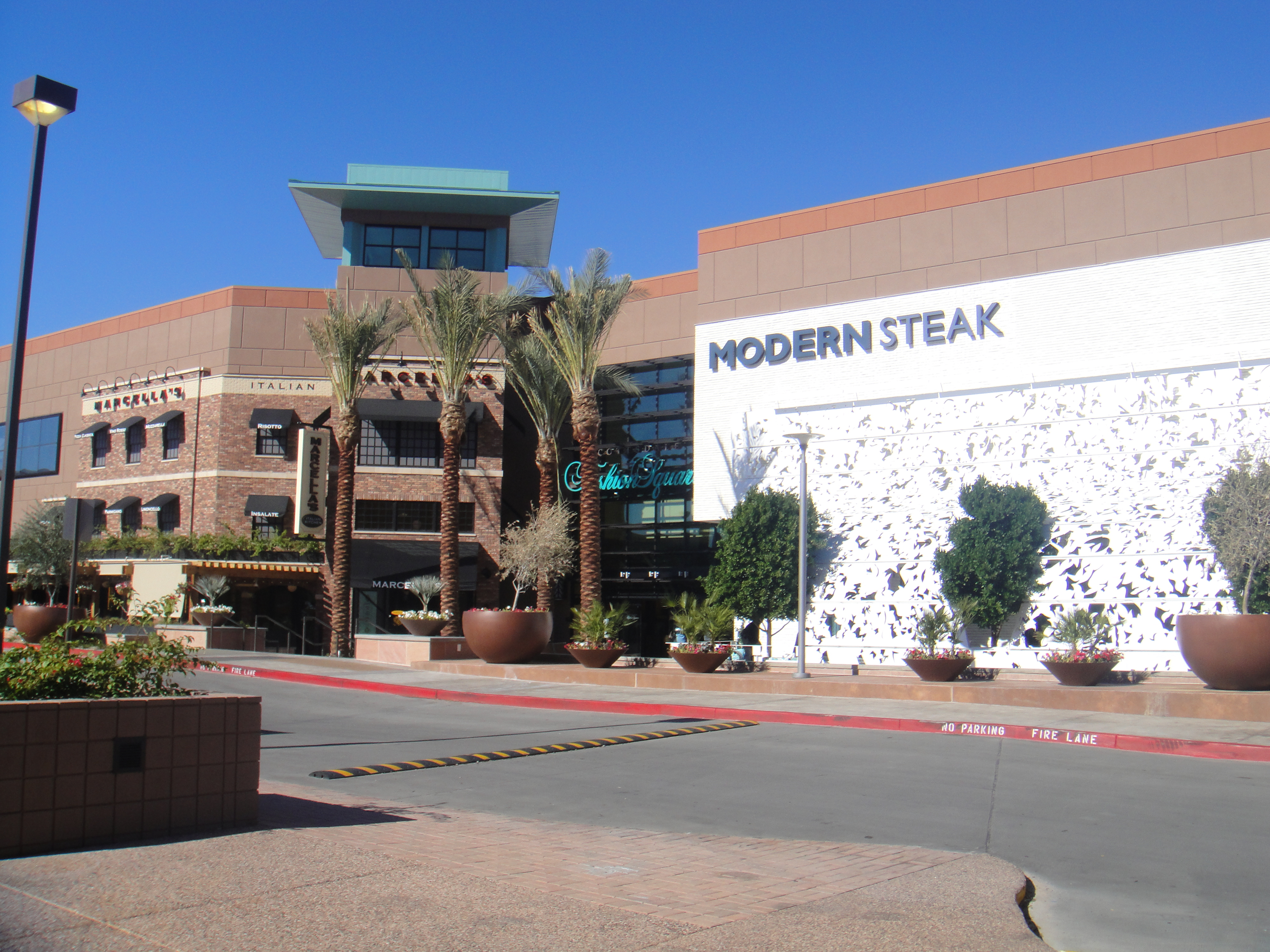
- "Story. Style. Spirit."
- Location: Northwest corner of Camelback & Scottsdale Roads
- Coordinates: 33°30′14″N 111°55′43″W
- Address: 7014 East Camelback Road; Scottsdale, Arizona 85251; United States
- Opened: 1961
- Developer: Westcor
- Manager: Macerich
- Owner: Macerich
- Architect: Edward L. Varney 1961, Belli & Belli 1977, Callison Architects Inc. 1998-present, GH+A 2018
- Num. of stores: 203
- Num. of anchor tenants: 7
- Floor area: 2,120,000 square feet (197,000 m^{2})
- Floors: 3
- Parking: Underground Garage, Above-grade garage and parking lot
- Website: www.fashionsquare.com

Scottsdale Fashion Square is an upscale luxury shopping mall located in the downtown area of Scottsdale, Arizona, United States. It is the largest shopping mall in the state, with approximately 2 million square feet (190,000 m^{2}) of retail space, and is among the top 30 largest malls in the country. The mall features Macy's, Dick's Sporting Goods, Dillard's, Nordstrom and Neiman Marcus, in addition to a 14-screen Harkins Theatres.

It has consistently been one of the most profitable malls in the United States, being ranked in 2016 as the second highest sales per square foot mall in the country, and as of 2016, it was ranked in the top 25 most visited malls in the country by Travel + Leisure magazine. The mall is located on the northwest corner of Scottsdale Road and Camelback Road in Scottsdale, Arizona, and has been owned by Westcor, a subsidiary of Macerich, since 2002. As of 2025, Scottsdale Fashion Square has been ranked No. 6 in the United States in the “Best Mall” category by USA Today’s 10Best Readers’ Choice Awards.

== History ==
During the 1930s and 1940s, the land which would become the Scottsdale Fashion Square was too far from the established Scottsdale and Phoenix business areas to be considered valuable. A Ryan-Evans drug store was the only retail establishment on the site. During the 1940s the 40-acre site was purchased by Harry Lenart. In the 1950s the land was used for a rodeo stadium before he began to plan for a small shopping center. In 1959, the center opened consisting of four stores in addition to the existing drug store: a grocery store, barber shop, liquor store, and camera store. In 1960 a steakhouse, built by Joe Hunt Sr. was added.

Scottsdale Fashion Square was originally built as a three-story open-air structure in 1961. The structure was designed by Edward L. Varney Associates, and built by Kitchell Contractors. It was anchored by two local Phoenix stores, department store Goldwater's and supermarket AJ Bayless. At the time, the primary competitor was the Los Arcos Mall, a fully enclosed mall built in 1969, also located in Scottsdale. Its early financial success led to an expansion of the west-side of the mall in 1974, which nearly doubled the square-footage of the mall. This expansion also added an additional department store, Diamond's, to the northern section of the mall.

In 1977, a competing mall, the fully enclosed Camelview Plaza, was built just west of Scottsdale Fashion Square, on the other side of North 70th Street. The competing mall was developed by Chicago business-man John F. Cuneo. Belli & Belli also of Chicago were the architects of the new mall. Camelview Plaza boasted Los Angeles department store Bullock's and Sakowitz. The shopping center also included a Harkins Camelview Theatre on an outparcel.

For several years, the two malls competed for shoppers and tenants. In 1982 after Westcor's purchase of the mall, the owners agreed to connect the malls by building a two-story retail bridge across North 70th Street, replacing the shuttle service that ran between the two malls. In the process, the street separating the two malls was sunk below grade-level, widened to four lanes, and renamed North Goldwater Boulevard. The two malls were largely gutted and completely renovated. Dillard's took over the former AJ Bayless and Diamond's spaces to create a new department store, while Goldwater's was expanded to 235,000 square feet (21,800 m^{2}). A ground-level food court, anchored by a 7-screen Harkins Theatres cinema, was also added. The redevelopment was completed in 1991, closely followed by the addition of Neiman Marcus (in the former Sakowitz) in 1992.

Waterfall Staircase in Palm Court, since replaced by elevator. Image from 2009.

Goldwater's became J. W. Robinson's in 1989, only to be converted into Robinsons-May in 1993. Bullock's closed its doors at Camelview Plaza in 1996, and remained vacant for several years. That same year, Westcor purchased Camelview Plaza and renamed the entire 1,800,000-square-foot (170,000 m^{2}) shopping plaza, Scottsdale Fashion Square. The new ownership brought major changes to the mall, the largest being the addition of a new wing anchored by Arizona's first Nordstrom store and featuring many upscale retailers. At that time, Dillard's took over the former Bullock's store and expanded it to 365,000 square feet (33,900 m^{2}), making the Scottsdale store the largest in the company's fleet. This expansion increased the mall's square footage to 2,000,000 sq ft (190,000 m^{2}) and made it the 13th largest enclosed shopping mall in the country. The expansion was completed in 1998 and was designed by Callison Architects Inc. of Seattle, while the addition was built by the original contractor Kitchell.

Additions like Neiman Marcus and Nordstrom were facilitated with aid from the city. For instance, the city gave the mall a $4 million tax rebate to attract Neiman Marcus and a 90 percent rebate on city sales tax generated at the waterfront for 25 years to bring in Nordstrom in the late 1990s.

Sears briefly occupied the former Dillard's store, only to be replaced by Macy's in 2002.

Scottsdale Fashion Square Palm Court in 2007

The merger between Federated Department Stores and May Department Stores brought the closure Robinsons-May in June 2006, leading the mall to demolish the former department store and build another new wing anchored by Barneys New York. The new wing, which also featured an H&M store, opened in 2009. That same year, the first Microsoft Store opened elsewhere in the mall.

Another expansion was added in 2015: a two-level building with Dick's Sporting Goods on the lower level and a new 14-screen Harkins Theatres cinema on the top level. In early 2016, Barneys New York announced it would shutter its Scottsdale Fashion Square store. In late 2016 the mall's owner, Macerich, announced plans of a new renovation, in excess of $100 million, which will include high-end residential units, a hotel, a new luxury entrance, hospitality areas and office space. Construction began in 2017, with the renovation completed in the fall of 2018. Apple relocated their store from Biltmore Fashion Park to build a new store at the Scottsdale Fashion Square location on September 29, 2018.

In 2019, Scottsdale Fashion Square transformed the former Barneys New York location into a co-working space operated by Industrious, a Manhattan-based company. The co-working space spans two stories and approximately 33,000 square feet at the mall's east corner near Scottsdale and Camelback roads.

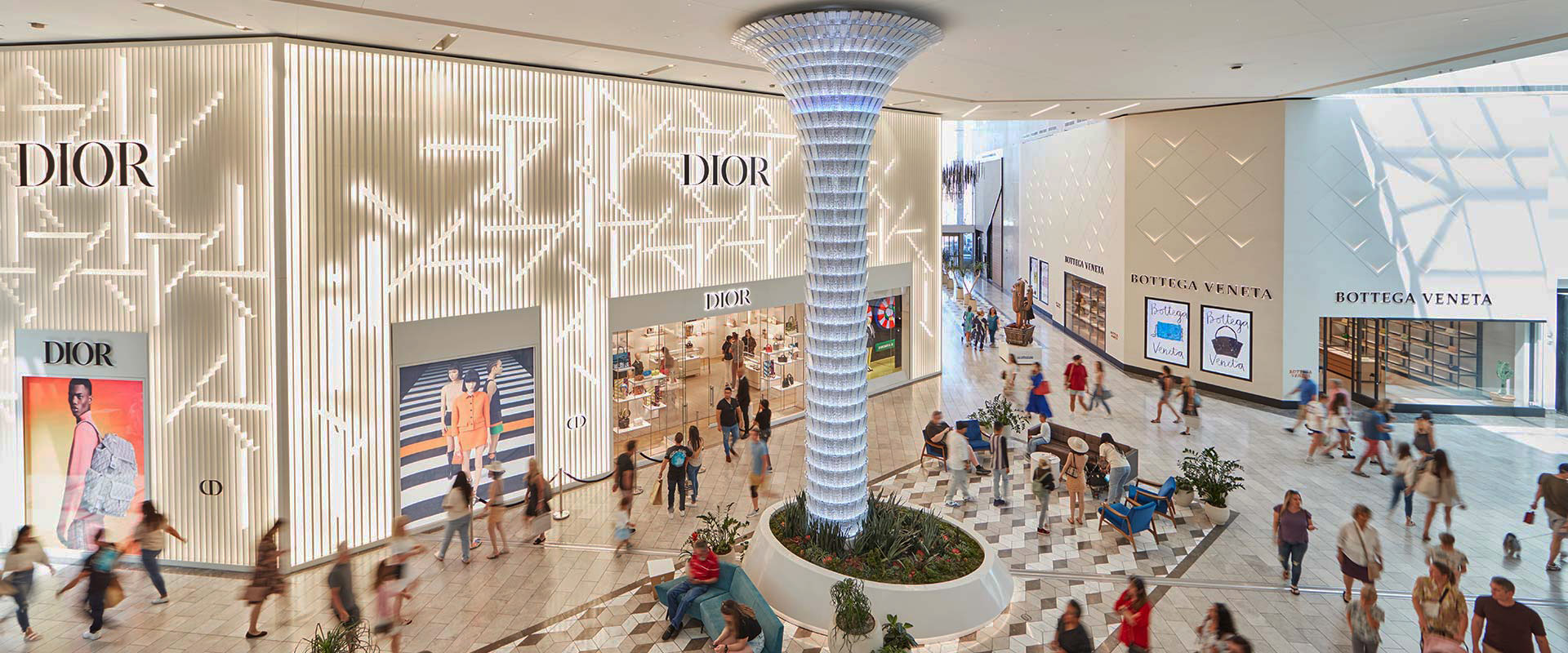
Crystal Court outside of Neiman Marcus and Dillard's

Later in 2021 a luxury fitness center, Life Time Fitness, announced they would be opening outside of the northwest luxury entrance. The 40,000-square-foot, three-level fitness center would be outside the mall's so-called "luxury wing," where Nobu, Tocaya Modern Mexican, Zinque, and other restaurants are located.

In early October 2022, Macerich reported they were going to be continuing the luxury renovations from 2018 throughout the exterior and interior of the southern Nordstrom wing. It would include "two-story storefronts and exterior-facing retail buildings at the south entrance, and a porte cochere that will incorporate up to five destination restaurants", and a luxury valet service. Macerich also stated, "Everything will come together to deliver a more cohesive and holistic luxury experience for guests and retailers throughout the property." This renovation started in late January 2023.

By 2023, since the government lockdown, Scottsdale Fashion Square had announced several new additions, including Hermès, Gucci Men's Store, Versace, Warby Parker, Fabletics, Levi's, Golden Goose, Casper, Capital One Café, Buck Mason, Psycho Bunny, and Lucid Studio.

In May 2023, Scottsdale Fashion Square announced the addition of Élephante, an upscale, experiential restaurant from the Wish You Were Here Group. This new location, spanning 12,000 square feet, marks the first expansion of Élephante outside Los Angeles. The restaurant will feature an indoor-outdoor space, a cocktail lounge, and a menu that includes wood-fired pizzas, fresh pastas, premium meats, and a wine selection of over 1,200 labels.

It was later announced that Macerich planned an opening of a boutique hotel for March 2024 under the name Caesar's Republic Scottsdale. In addition new restaurants were announced to open soon including Catch Seafood for the main mall as well as Luna and Pronto, followed by Seven for the Caesars Republic Scottsdale hotel.

On February 29, 2024, Scottsdale Fashion Square held its grand opening ceremony to celebrate the launch of its new hotel the Caesar's Republic Scottsdale. The 11-story, 265 room hotel is located on the north side where it officially opened to the public on March 6 of that same year.

=== Performance and economic impact ===
As of September 30, 2018 Scottsdale Fashion Square reported the sixth-highest sales per square foot among Macerich's 54 properties, achieving $1,032 per square foot, according to SEC filings. The mall maintains a high occupancy rate of 92.6 percent and boasts annual sales exceeding $650 million.

In 2016, it contributed $13.1 million in sales tax revenue to the City of Scottsdale, accounting for approximately 7 percent of the city's total sales tax revenue of $187.2 million for that year. Mayor Jim Lane highlighted the mutual benefits, stating, “We’ve always felt that Fashion Square’s success is the city’s success, and we also do believe that the city’s success also lends itself to Fashion Square’s success.”

=== Covid-19 ===
The COVID-19 pandemic significantly impacted shopping malls across the country, including Scottsdale Fashion Square. According to Macerichecutives, the overall occupancy rate for the company's malls dropped to 91 percent, and traffic was at about 80 percent of the previous year's levels. Sales were trending at 90 percent compared to the previous year. Macerich's revenues for the third quarter of 2020 were $185.8 million, down 19.6 percent from a year earlier. Despite these challenges, there were signs of improvement. By October 7, 2020, all of Macerich's malls had reopened, and the company reported improvements in rent collections, reaching about 80 percent in the third quarter, up from 64 percent in the second quarter. Macerich also managed to secure agreements with most tenants to defer back rent payments to 2021. Those tenants that weren't able to secure agreements filed lawsuits including The Disney Store, Gap, Banana Republic, and more.

In response, Scottsdale Fashion Square issued new hygiene and safety protocols to combat the virus, for which they later received the Bureau Veritas’ SafeGuard™ Hygiene Excellence and Safety Certification. “The health and safety of our shoppers and employees is our first priority,” said Sutton, the center's representative.

== Events and attractions ==
=== Caesar's Republic Hotel ===
In March 2024, the new Caesars Republic Hotel opened adjacent to Scottsdale Fashion Square. This marks Caesars Entertainment's first non-gaming property in the United States. The 11-story hotel features 265 guestrooms, 20,000 square feet of event space, two pools, and three restaurants.

=== Lunar New Year ===
Scottsdale Fashion Square frequently hosts a variety of cultural and community events. One notable event is the annual Lunar New Year celebration, organized in partnership with Phoenix Chinese Week. On January 27, 2024, Scottsdale Fashion Square and partners from Phoenix Chinese Week gathered to celebrate the Lunar New Year. The celebration, marking the Year of the Dragon, featured an enormous dragon dancing throughout the shopping center, symbolizing good luck and prosperity for the new year.

== Security and safety ==
=== George Floyd protests ===
In 2020, the mall was vandalized and looted after protesters violated curfew during the George Floyd protests. The police made twelve arrests including YouTube star and boxer Jake Paul, who claimed that he did not take part in the looting and was only recording it. Paul was charged with criminal trespass and unlawful assembly on June 4 for entering the mall illegally with the rioters. The first court date began on July 8. On August 5, 2020, the charges were dismissed without prejudice, with the Scottsdale Police Department saying it was "in the best interest of the community" and that a federal criminal investigation would be completed instead.

=== Incident involving off-duty police officer ===
On February 19, 2018, an off-duty police officer working security at Scottsdale Fashion Square shot and killed a man in the Brown Parking Garage. The incident occurred after the officer responded to reports of the man's "erratic behavior," which led employees to suspect him of shoplifting. According to the Scottsdale Police Department, the man raised a handgun when the officer identified himself and commanded the man to stop. The officer fired his service weapon, stopping the man. Despite attempts by police and fire crews to save his life, the man died at the scene. The suspect, who had a warrant for his arrest on drug violations, was found with several shoplifted items and a loaded semi-automatic handgun. The off-duty officer involved in the shooting, a 12-year veteran of the Scottsdale Police Department, was placed on paid administrative leave following the incident.

== Controversies ==
=== Municipal bond controversy ===
A parking garage adjacent to the Scottsdale Fashion Square Mall (aka the "Nordstrom Garage") was constructed by Scottsdale Fashion Square Partners and leased to the City of Scottsdale in 1998 for 50 years for $31,375,000. In 2012 Scottsdale Mayor Jim Lane and the city council approved a prepayment of the lease, financed by issuance of municipal bonds. However, in 2015 the IRS notified the city that the issuance was being challenged for non-compliance with the federal tax code. One possible basis for such challenges is failure of the "public purpose test".

=== Zoning changes ===
Macerich CEO Ken Greenberg acknowledged that the mall's current dense downtown location would not have been chosen today for its development, preferring a location adjacent to a freeway with space to expand horizontally. This unconventional location led to the pursuit of zoning changes to build vertically instead. The most recent changes in 2017 faced resistance from local residents due to the mall's request for increased building heights to develop hotel, office, and residential spaces. Macerich addressed some community concerns by increasing setback requirements, adding open spaces, and limiting building heights to 90 feet in certain areas.

=== Stores closing ===
Scottsdale Fashion Square has undergone significant transformations, including the introduction of new high-end stores and extensive construction projects. As of 2023, several long-time tenants, including Williams Sonoma, Crate & Barrel, and Ann Taylor, have closed their stores due to the mall's shift towards becoming a luxury center. ASU professor Hitendra Chaturvedu commented that this was a smart decision to take advantage of the growing affluence in the area. As a result of these strategic moves, the mall has faced criticism for not renewing leases of long-time tenants and prioritizing luxury retailers.
