= SanTan Village =

Shopping mall in Maricopa County, Arizona, US

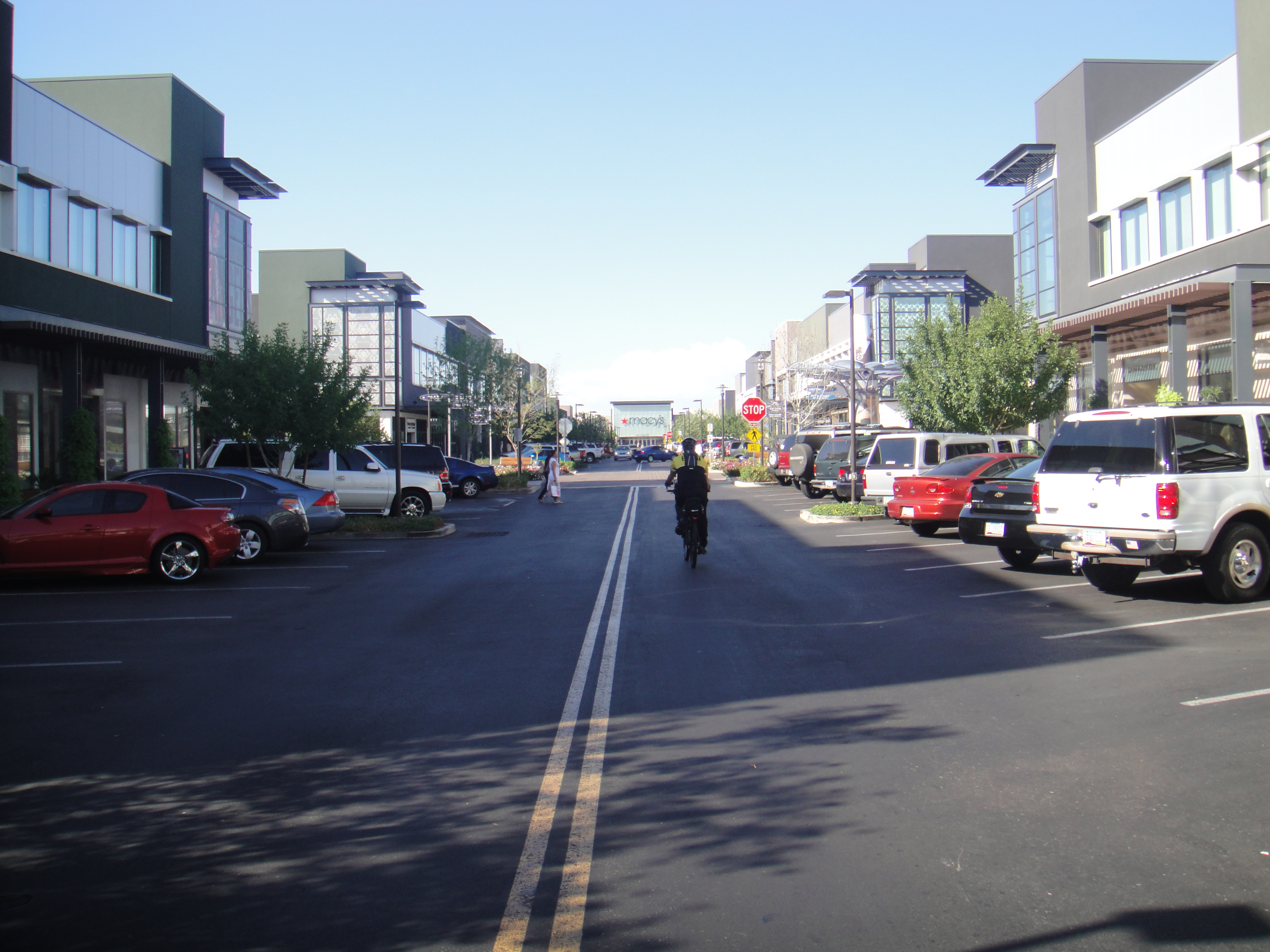
- SanTan Village looking north towards the Macy's department store
- Location: Gilbert, Arizona, United States
- Coordinates: 33°18′35″N 111°44′35″W
- Address: 2218 E. Williams Field Road & Loop 202 (SanTan Freeway)
- Opened: October 26, 2007; 19 years ago
- Developer: Westcor
- Owner: Macerich
- Architect: CommArts and Omniplan
- Num. of stores: 100+
- Num. of anchor tenants: 3
- Floor area: 927,692 square feet (86,185.4 m^{2})
- Floors: Ground Floor Retail, Limited Second Floor Office (several stores, including Dillard's, Dick's, Macy's and Barnes and Noble have two floors internally)
- Parking: Outdoor
- Website: shopsantanvillage.com
- Open-air, lifestyle super regional shopping center

SanTan Village is an open-air, super regional lifestyle center located in Gilbert, Arizona that spans 1,200,000 square feet (110,000 m^{2}) of gross leasable area. It sits at the core of a 500-acre (2.0 km^{2}) project that, upon planned full build out, will encompass 3,000,000 square feet (280,000 m^{2}) of retail, restaurants, entertainment, office space, residential and hotel uses. It was the last mall to be developed by Westcor and is still owned by Macerich.

The mall features the traditional retailers Macy's, Dillard's, Dick's Sporting Goods, Best Buy, Barnes & Noble in addition to a 16-screen Harkins Theatres.

The SanTan Village Marketplace, located south of the mall, is an urban village mixed with many other retail and restaurant areas designed for urban shopping.
