= Desert Sky Mall =

- Location: Phoenix, Arizona, United States
- Coordinates: 33°28′37″N 112°13′30″W
- Address: 7611 W Thomas Road
- Opened: March 1981
- Developer: Westcor
- Manager: Macerich
- Owner: Macerich
- Architect: Rafique Islam of Architectonics Inc.
- Num. of stores: 132
- Num. of anchor tenants: 3 (3 open, 1 vacant, 1 under construction)
- Floor area: 888,018 square feet (82,499.6 m^{2})
- Floors: 1 (2 in Curacao, Dillard's, and former Sears)
- Website: desertskymall.com

Desert Sky Mall is a regional shopping mall in west Phoenix, Arizona. It is located at 75th Avenue and Thomas Road. The mall was developed by Westcor and is managed by Macerich. The anchor stores are Curacao, Mercado de los Cielos, and Dillard's Clearance Center. There is one anchor tenant under construction that is set to become an entertainment center called Club Capri. Desert Sky Mall serves as a transit center for Valley Metro Bus.

== History ==
Desert Sky Mall (originally Westridge Mall) began construction in late 1979 and opened in March 1981. It was developed by Westcor who had recently finished up development of Paradise Valley Mall in northeast Phoenix. Rafique Islam of Architectonics Inc. was the designer. The mall was built with three anchor stores, Sears occupying the east space Diamond's occupying the center space and JCPenney occupying the west space. Sears and JCPenney opened in January 1981. Diamond's began construction of its store at that time and opened a year later.

Desert Sky underwent an expansion in 1993 which added two new anchor stores, Mervyn's and Montgomery Ward. The new stores added 175,000 square feet (16,300 m^{2}) to the mall. Also at this time the original mall underwent a renovation which added a parking lot sculpture, new flooring and windows in the food court. The expansion and renovation work was completed in October 1993.

It is currently the only regional mall in the southwest valley (and as such serving major nearby suburban areas such as Avondale, Goodyear, and Tolleson). In the years since the center's opening, the demographics of the bordering neighborhood have reflected the expansion of the Latino population in the Phoenix area.

In 2000, JCPenney closed its doors (now La Curacao since 2007) while Montgomery Ward closed its doors in 2001 (later replaced by Burlington Coat Factory in 2002). Originally owned by Westcor, in 2002 Desert Sky Mall became part of The Macerich Company's portfolio. In 2009, Mervyn's went out of business and closed its store, which is now El Mercado De Los Cielos.

In 2015, Sears Holdings spun off 235 of its properties, including the Sears at Desert Sky Mall, into Seritage Growth Properties. On October 15, 2018, it was announced that Sears would be closing as part of a plan to close 142 stores nationwide; it closed in January 2019.

On November 19, 2025, due to a storm with strong winds and hail, the ceiling of the mall partially collapsed and severed a line of the fire suppression system, which resulted in flooding and the mall was closed temporarily.

In 2026, the Sears was purchased by Club Capri Real Estate who intends to repurpose and renovate the former Sears into a multi-level entertainment destination that can be used for a wide variety of events. As of 2026, the development is currently ongoing.
