= Biltmore Fashion Park =

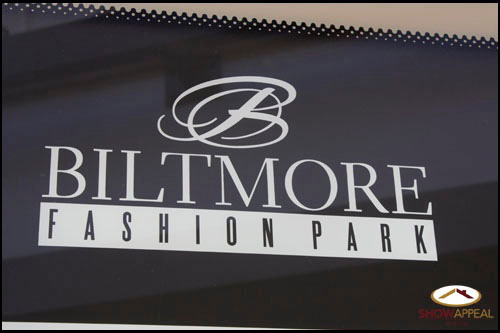
- Location: Phoenix, Arizona
- Coordinates: 33°30′38″N 112°01′42″W
- Address: 24th Street & Camelback Rd
- Opened: 1963
- Manager: RED Development
- Owner: RED Development
- Architect: Welton Becket, Charles Luckman
- Num. of stores: 55+
- Num. of anchor tenants: 2
- Floor area: 611,000 sq ft (56,800 m^{2})
- Floors: 1 (2 in Saks Fifth Avenue, Forever XXI, and Arhaus, 4 in Macy's and Parking Garage)
- Parking: Outdoor & Garage
- Website: shopbiltmore.com

The Biltmore Fashion Park is an outdoor retail and dining mall located in the Biltmore District of Phoenix, Arizona, along East Camelback Rd. The Biltmore Fashion Park, as well as the surrounding business and residential district, is named after the historic Arizona Biltmore Hotel nearby.

The shopping center first opened in 1963 and underwent a major renovations in 2002, which included the addition of new stores and restaurants, as well as a redesign of the outdoor spaces. Macy's and Life Time Luxury Health Club currently anchor the mall.

== History ==
Biltmore Fashion Park opened on 31 acres (130,000 m^{2}) of land in what was once considered the outskirts of Phoenix in 1963. The anchor stores at the mall's opening were the upscale San Francisco-based I. Magnin and Saks Fifth Avenue, joined in 1968 by Los Angeles-based The Broadway. It was the city's original luxury shopping and dining destination. The mall was designed by Welton Becket and Associates and built by the Chanen Construction Company. The original Saks Fifth Avenue (now Life Time gym) featured stone walls native to the region and concrete Native American hieroglyphics. The Broadway building, which was the first expansion of the mall, was designed by Charles Luckman and built by the Del E. Webb Corporation in 1968.

During the 1960s and 1970s, The Gittings Portrait Studio at the Biltmore photographed the likes of John Wayne, Bob Hope, Princess Grace of Monaco, Barry Goldwater, Red Skelton, Sophia Loren, and many other celebrities and well-known figures who frequented the Biltmore.

In the mid-1990s, the center was purchased by Taubman Centers for $115 million. During this period, the Biltmore underwent a transformation.

Federated Department Stores (now Macy's, Inc.) retired the I. Magnin brand in 1994; at Biltmore, Saks Fifth Avenue took over the Magnin space, which at 90,000 square feet (8,400 m^{2}), was larger than its old one (60,000 square feet (5,600 m^{2})). Saks moved, and opened its new store on March 23, 1995.

Federated also retired The Broadway as a brand, and converted the Biltmore store, like many others, to Macy's. The center also introduced a number of new luxury retailers. The Biltmore was also chosen as one of three sites nationwide for The Galleries of Neiman Marcus; however, Neiman Marcus folded the concept two years later.

By the early 2000s, Westcor bought the shopping center, triggering a relocation project whereby the more global brands moved to Fashion Square to allow more room for "home-grown" and "fashion-forward" stores at Biltmore. The mall was renovated in 2005 at a cost of $30 million, with one-third of its retail space changing tenants as a result. At that time the mall stated that it had 610,000 sq ft (57,000 m^{2}) of retail space.

In late July 2024, the mall was sold to RED Development, a local real estate company. On November 11, 2024, the mall's new owner announced it would be redeveloped. One of the plans is a ten-story tower, which might include a mix of retail and restaurants, office, hotel, and residential space.

On February 10, 2026, it was announced that Saks Fifth Avenue would be closing as part of a plan to close 8 stores nationwide.
