= Buckle (clothing retailer) =

American fashion retailer

The Buckle, Inc.

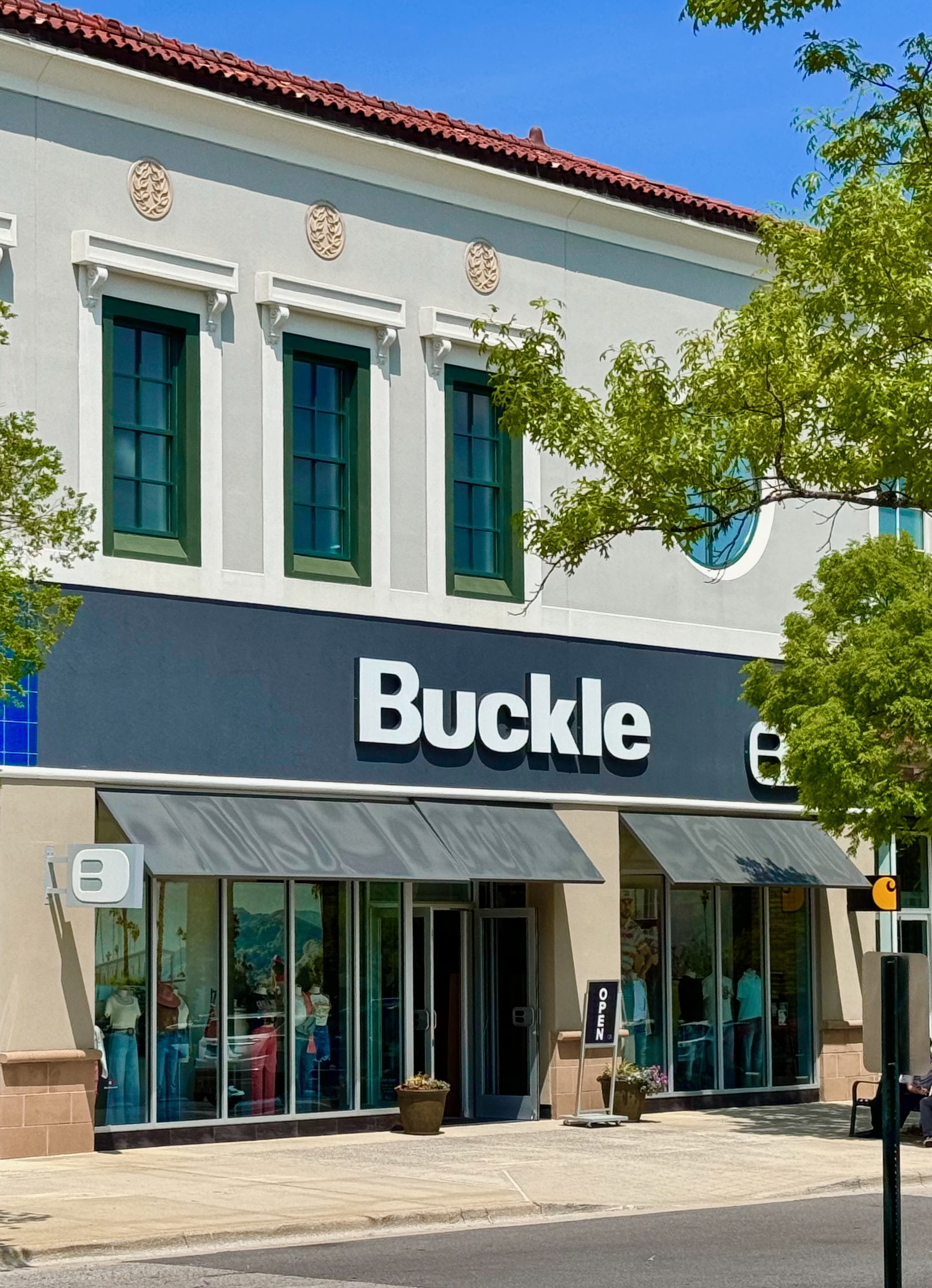
- Buckle located at The Summit (Alabama)
- Company type: Public
- Traded as: NYSE: BKE; S&P 600 component
- Industry: Retail
- Founded: 1948; 78 years ago
- Founder: David Hirschfeld
- Headquarters: Kearney, Nebraska, U.S.
- Number of locations: 451
- Area served: United States
- Key people: Daniel Hirschfeld (Chairman); Dennis Nelson (CEO)
- Products: Clothing, footwear, and accessories
- Services: Clothing retail
- Revenue: ▼US$913.38 million (2017)
- Operating income: ▼US$134.08 million (2017)
- Net income: ▼US$89.7 million (2017)
- Total assets: ▼US$538.12 million (2017)
- Total equity: ▼US$391.24 million (2017)
- Number of employees: 9,000 (2017)
- Website: www.buckle.com

The Buckle, Inc., is an American fashion retailer selling clothing, footwear, and accessories for men, women, and children. The company operates 451 stores in 42 states throughout the United States of America, under the names Buckle and The Buckle. Buckle markets brand name and private label apparel, including denim, other casual bottoms, tops and shirts, dresses and rompers, sportswear and athleisure, outerwear, footwear, swimwear, fragrances, sunglasses, bags and purses, wallets, and other accessories.

== History ==
Buckle began as a men's clothing store established in 1948 in Kearney, Nebraska. The first store was founded by David Hirschfeld and operated under the name Mills Clothing. His son, Dan Hirschfeld, took over the business in 1965. In 1967, a second store was purchased and operated under the name Brass Buckle. The company began selling more casual men's clothing and by the early 1970s, Brass Buckle had developed into a denim-based store offering a wide selection of denim and shirts.

In 1977, the company introduced women's clothing and the first mall-based location was opened. In 1991, Brass Buckle changed its name to The Buckle, Inc. and began development of private clothing label 'bkle', known today as BKE. The following year, the company went public on the NASDAQ, where it was traded as BKLE. The company reached operations of 100 stores in 18 states.

- 1997 – The Buckle moved to the New York Stock Exchange, where it now trades under the symbol, BKE. In 1998, The Buckle reached operations of 200 stores in 29 states.
- 1999 – The first eCommerce website was launched.
- 2009 – The Buckle reached operation of 400 stores in 41 states.
- 2010 – The company completed construction of a new 240,000 square feet, state-of-the-art distribution center.
- 2011 – The company reached a milestone of selling five million pairs of jeans in one year.
- 2017 – The Buckle operated over 450 stores in 44 states.

== Merchandise ==
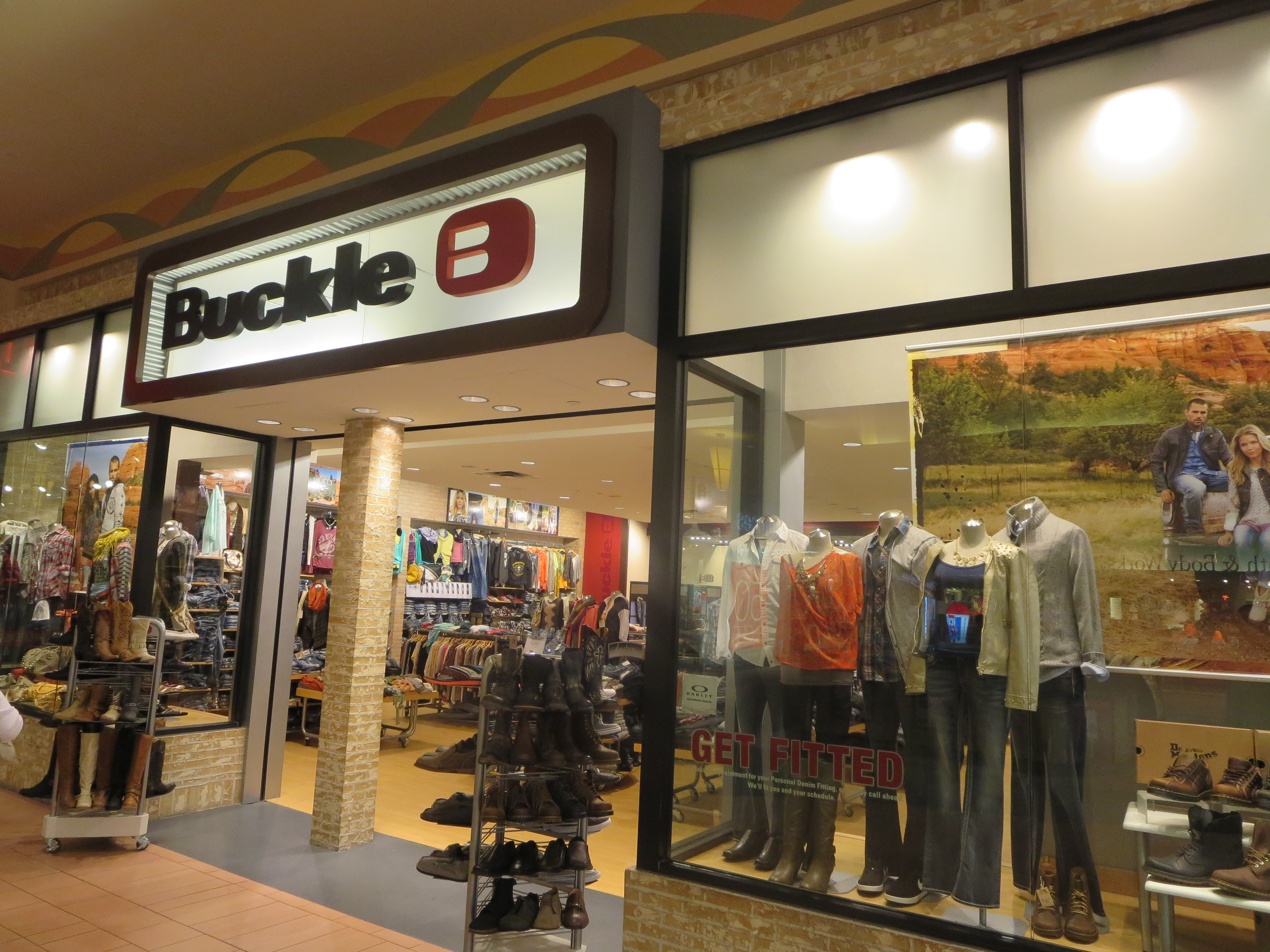
Former Buckle store inside Southern Park Mall

Buckle markets denim jeans, casual bottoms, fashion tops and shirts, dresses and rompers, active wear, outerwear, footwear, swimwear, fragrances, sunglasses, bags and purses, wallets, and other accessories. Buckle's own private label brands make up 35% of sales.
