= Macerich =

American real estate company

The Macerich Company
- Type: Public
- Traded as: NYSE: MAC; S&P 600 component
- Industry: Real estate investment trust
- Founded: 1964; 62 years ago
- Founder: Mace Siegel; Richard Cohen
- Headquarters: Santa Monica, California, U.S.
- Key people: Steven Hash (chairman of the Board); Jackson Hsieh (CEO); Daniel Swanstrom (CFO); Ann C. Menard (CLO)
- Revenue: ▲$918 million (2024)
- Net income: ▲ -$194 million (2024)
- Total assets: ▲$8.567 billion (2024)
- Total equity: ▲$2.756 billion (2024)
- Number of employees: 616 (2024)
- Website: www.macerich.com

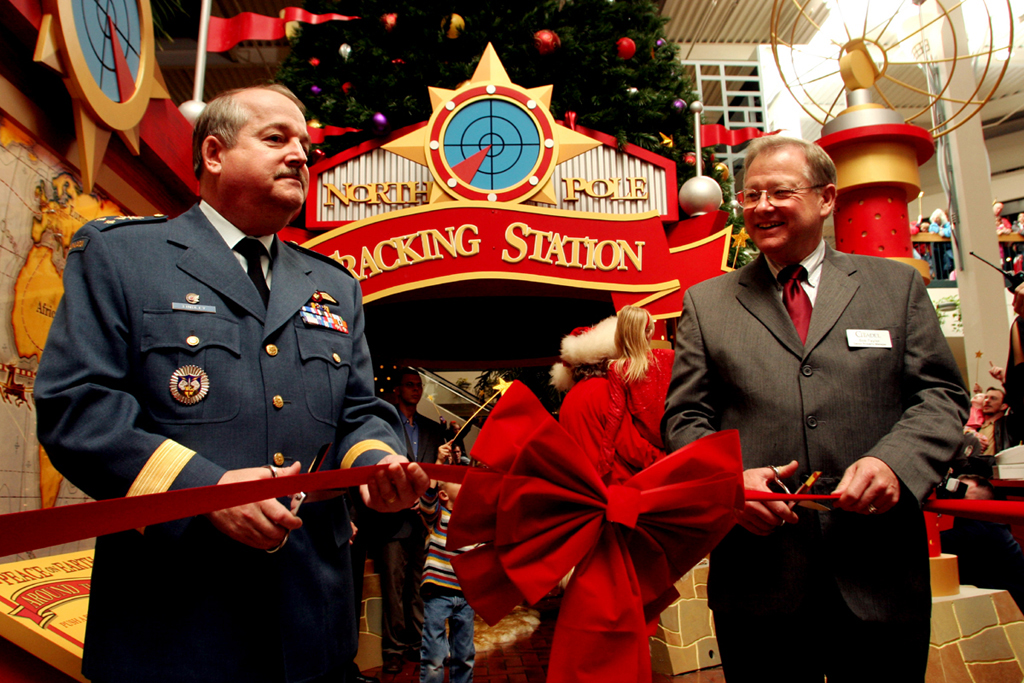
Lt.-Gen. Rick Findley, deputy commander of the North American Aerospace Defense Command, and Robert Taylor, senior property manager at Citadel Mall, perform the ceremonial ribbon cutting during the November 18, 2005 launch of the Citadel Mall's Santa Tracking Station.

The Macerich Company (/ˈmeɪsrɪtʃ/ MAYSS-ritch) is an American real estate investment trust that invests in shopping centers. The company is headquartered in Santa Monica, California, and was founded in 1964.

It is the third-largest owner and operator of shopping centers in the United States. As of December 31, 2024, the company owned interests in 43 properties comprising 43 million square feet of leasable area. The company name is a portmanteau of its founders, Mace Siegel and Richard Cohen.

== History ==
The Macerich Company was founded in New York in 1964 by Mace Siegel and Richard Cohen.

In 1994, the company went public with an initial public offering.

In 2002, Macerich acquired Phoenix, Arizona–based Westcor for $1.475 billion. The purchase added 9 properties to Macerich's portfolio making them the largest mall owner in the Phoenix Metropolitan Area.

In 2005, the company acquired most of Rochester, New York-based Wilmorite Properties' portfolio for $2.333 billion, adding 11 shopping centers to Macerich's portfolio, including Tysons Corner Center in Tysons, Virginia.

In 2006, the company rebranded as "Macerich."

On April 1, 2015, the company rejected a $16.8 billion takeover offer from Simon Property Group.

In 2024, Jackson Hsieh took over as CEO of Macerich, succeeding former CEO, Thomas O'Hern. In the same year, the company announced that Daniel Swanstrom would succeed Scott Kingsmore as CFO.

== Notable investments ==
| Mall | Location | Notes |
|---|---|---|
| Annapolis Mall | Annapolis, Maryland | Acquired May 6, 2026 for a combined $272 million |
| Arrowhead Towne Center | Glendale, Arizona | Acquired in May 2024 for $36.5 million |
| Broadway Plaza | Walnut Creek, California | |
| Chandler Fashion Center | Chandler, Arizona | Acquired in 2002 |
| Crabtree | Raleigh, North Carolina | Acquired in 2025 for $290 million |
| Danbury Fair Mall | Danbury, Connecticut | Acquired in 2005 |
| Deptford Mall | Deptford Township, New Jersey | Acquired in 2006 for $241 million |
| Desert Sky Mall | Phoenix, Arizona | |
| Eastland Mall | Evansville, Indiana | Took majority ownership in 2012 after previously co-owning with Simon Property Group |
| Fashion District Philadelphia | Philadelphia, Pennsylvania | Took majority ownership in 2020 and full ownership in 2023 |
| Fashion Fair Mall | Fresno, California | |
| Fashion Outlets of Chicago | Rosemont, Illinois | Took full ownership in 2014 |
| Fashion Outlets of Niagara Falls | Niagara Falls, New York | Acquired in 2011 for $200 million |
| Flatiron Crossing Mall | Broomfield, Colorado | Acquired full ownership in 2012 |
| Freehold Raceway Mall | Freehold Township, New Jersey | |
| Green Acres Mall | Valley Stream, New York | Acquired in 2013 for $500 million |
| Inland Center | San Bernardino, California | Acquired in 2004 with Walton Inland Investors IV |
| Kierland Commons | Phoenix, Arizona | |
| Kings Plaza | Brooklyn, New York | |
| La Cumbre Plaza | Santa Barbara, California | long-term lease through 2077 |
| Los Cerritos Center | Cerritos, California | |
| The Mall of Victor Valley | Victorville, California | |
| NorthPark Mall | Davenport, Iowa | |
| Oakridge Mall | San Jose, California | Acquired November 16, 2026 for $250 million |
| Pacific View Mall | Ventura, California | |
| Queens Center | Queens, New York | |
| SanTan Village | Gilbert, Arizona | |
| Scottsdale Fashion Square | Scottsdale, Arizona | |
| South Plains Mall | Lubbock, Texas | Purchased in 1998 for $115.7 million |
| Stonewood Center | Downey, California | |
| Superstition Springs Center | Mesa, Arizona | |
| Twenty Ninth Street | Boulder, Colorado | Developed and managed the open-air retail center |
| Tysons Corner Center | Tysons Corner, Virginia | |
| Valley River Center | Eugene, Oregon | |
| The Village at Corte Madera | Corte Madera, California | |
| Vintage Faire Mall | Modesto, California | |
| Washington Square | Tigard, Oregon | |

== See also ==
- Shopping property management firms
