= Little Red Schoolhouse =

Little Red Schoolhouse may refer to:

== Schools ==
- Little Red Schoolhouse (Beyerville, Arizona), a historic one-room school built in 1921
- Little Red Schoolhouse (Kingman, Arizona), listed on the National Register of Historic Places (NRHP)
- Little Red Schoolhouse (Scottsdale, Arizona), now used as the Scottsdale Historical Museum, NRHP-listed
- Garcia School, Wickenburg, Arizona, also known as the "Little Red Schoolhouse"
- Little Red Schoolhouse (Cedar Falls, Iowa), part of the Cedar Falls Historical Society
- Little Red Schoolhouse (West Farmington, Maine), NRHP-listed
- Little Red Schoolhouse (Amherst, Massachusetts), preschool designed by McKim, Mead and White
- Eureka Masonic College, Richland, Mississippi, also known as the "Little Red Schoolhouse", birthplace of the Order of the Eastern Star
- Little Red Schoolhouse (Milton Mills, New Hampshire), listed on the New Hampshire State Register of Historic Places
- Little Red School House (Newport, New Hampshire), NRHP-listed
- Little Red Schoolhouse (Florham Park, New Jersey), NRHP-listed
- Little Red Schoolhouse (Lyndhurst, New Jersey), NRHP-listed
- Little Red Schoolhouse (Middletown, New Jersey), NRHP-listed
- Little Red Schoolhouse (South Branch, New Jersey), NRHP-listed
- Little Red Schoolhouse (Washington Valley, New Jersey), NRHP-listed
- Little Red Schoolhouse (Brunswick, New York), NRHP-listed
- Clymer District School No. 5, also known as the "Little Red Schoolhouse", Clymer, New York
- Little Red School House, New York City, a progressive school
- Old District 10 Schoolhouse, Middleburg Heights, Ohio, also known as the "Little Red Schoolhouse", NRHP-listed
- Little Red Schoolhouse (Shaw Island, Washington), NRHP-listed, in San Juan County

== Films ==
- The Little Red Schoolhouse (1923 film), an American silent film
- The Little Red Schoolhouse, a 1936 American drama film

== See also ==
- One-room school
