= Mesa Ranch School =

Former boys school in Arizona

Coordinates: 33°23′37″N 111°48′28″W

- Mesa, Arizona; United States

Information
- School type: Ranch School
- Established: 1902
- Founder: H. David Evans
- Closed: 1943
- Gender: Boys
- Age: 15 to 18
- Enrollment: c.20

The Mesa Ranch School was a ranch school in Mesa, Arizona, that was established in 1902 by H. David Evans, a Briton with a Cambridge education who arrived in Arizona in 1899. It was designed to offer students from the eastern seaboard a western ranch lifestyle in a "dry and equable climate". Modeled as western equivalent of Phillips Academy, the Evans School was a college preparatory academy for 20 boys ages 15–18. Life at the school was described as "simple, even rough, the boys living each in his own cabin, keeping horses and making camping trips." In the mountains near Flagstaff the school maintained a summer tutoring camp.

The Mesa Campus was located 2 1/2 miles SE of downtown Mesa on El Rancho Bonito near the modern intersection of Stapley Dr and Southern Ave. In 1922 the school was renamed the Mesa Ranch School, a name it retained until it was destroyed by fire in 1943.

== Notable alumni ==
- Grenville Goodwin, anthropologist
- Jonathan Latimer, writer
- John Davis Lodge, Congressman, Governor of Connecticut, and United States Ambassador to Spain
- Archie & Quentin Roosevelt, the youngest sons of President Theodore Roosevelt
- Leverett A. Saltonstall, U.S. Senator from Massachusetts
- William H. Vanderbilt III, Governor of Rhode Island

== See also ==
- Ranch school
