= Jokake School for Girls =

Defunct ranch school in Arizona, United States

Information
- Established: 1933
- Closed: 1945
- Gender: Girls
- Enrollment: c.40

The Jokake School for Girls was a ranch school in Scottsdale, Arizona. It operated from 1933 to 1945. It housed 40 students each year it was in existence. It was connected to the Jokake Inn, a guest ranch and winter hotel built by architect Robert Evans and backing out onto Camelback Mountain. The inn opened in 1927.

== See also ==
- The Little Outfit Schoolhouse
