= Cine Capri =

Former movie theater in Phoenix, Arizona, United States

- Interactive map of the Cine Capri area

General information
- Status: Permanently closed and demolished
- Location: Phoenix, Arizona, 2323 E Camelback Rd., Phoenix, AZ 85016
- Groundbreaking: 1964
- Opened: March 31, 1966
- Renovated: 1988
- Demolished: 1998
- Owner: Paramount Studio (1964-1988), Harkins Theatres (1988-1998)

Technical details
- Floor area: 16,500-square feet

Design and construction
- Architects: Ralph Haver, Henry George Greene, George M. Aurelius
- Structural engineer: Magadini & Associates
- Main contractor: Homes & Son Construction Company

The Cine Capri was a movie theater located in Phoenix, Arizona, United States, which operated from 1966 to 1998.

== History ==
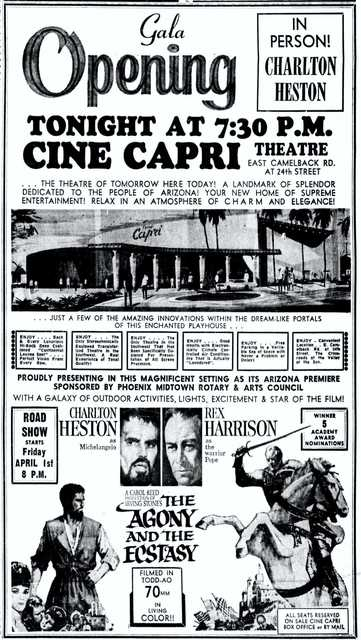
Newspaper ad for Cine Capri grand opening on April 1, 1966 in the Arizona Republic

=== Construction ===
The original Cine Capri Theatre was located at the southwest corner of 24th Street and Camelback Roads in Phoenix, Arizona. The theatre was owned by Paramount Studios, and its construction in 1964 required approval by the Federal District Court of New York to satisfy anti-trust laws. The building was designed by George M. Aurelius, vice-president and general manager of Arizona Paramount Corporation, Henry George Greene, consulting architect to ABC Theaters, W. E. (Bill) Homes, Jr., president of Homes & Son Construction Company, Ralph Haver, president of Haver, Nunn & Jensen, architects for Barrows Plaza, and Spero Kontos of the Los Angeles-based John Filbert Company.

The large, 16,500-square-foot (1,530 m^{2}) facility featured dual colonnades flanking both sides of the theater; ten pre-cast white, columns weighing seven tons each. They were supported with overhangs with copper fascias cured to achieve an antique green patina. There was a large portico that served as the main entrance and a patio off the east lobby to provide shelter for waiting patrons and intermission breaks. The entire lower building façade was overlaid with imported hexagonal jade Italian tile. In the center was a multi-paneled, 24-foot-long (7.3 m), custom antique stained glass window which served as a focal point. Low profile desert landscaping surrounded the theatre, including palm, Russian Olive, and Italian cypress trees. Patrons could see the Camelback Mountain and its Praying Monk rock formation from the two-level lobby.

The auditorium was enveloped in a 4,000 yards (3,700 m) of antique gold fabric covering the proscenium and walls. A gold curtain moved vertically to reveal the title curtain behind, which opened horizontally to expose the film on a giant curved screen which extended out to the fifth row of seats.

The Cine Capri was the first multipurpose theater in the southwest specifically designed to project all film aspect ratios of the time, including Cinemascope, Vista-Vision, and Cinerama from its 70/35 mm projectors and stereophonic sound system.

=== Opening ===
The Cine Capri opened with the Charlton Heston film The Agony and the Ecstasy. On March 31, 1966, Charlton Heston hosted a youth drama clinic in the theater auditorium for several dozen high school and college students. This was followed by an afternoon “show & tell” reception for distinguished guests to personally meet Mr. Heston. Attendees included community leaders, city and state officials, the press, radio and television personnel, studio and distribution executives, and neighborhood merchants. Also there were the architects, contractors, members of the trade and craft suppliers, the Phoenix Art Council and the Mid Town Rotary Club, the sponsors of the evening charity program. Later Heston officially launched the theater with a ribbon cutting ceremony.

The 1977 movie Star Wars played at the Cine Capri for over a year - the longest run in the United States. The Cine Capri held one of the highest grosses for the George Lucas film. Famed snowboard artist Joe Sorren painted an audience viewing a film, titled after the theater.

=== Demolition ===
After several years, the Arizona Paramount Corporation and ABC Paramount theaters disposed of their theater holdings and withdrew from the community. In 1988, the theater was renovated and re-opened by its new operator Harkins Theatres, a large privately owned movie theater chain.

In 1997, a year-long battle began between Harkins Theatres and the property owner over the decision to demolish the Cine Capri in favor of a high-rise office building. Despite over 260,000 petition signatures and efforts of the Save the Cine Capri Committee, as well as national publicity in Preservation magazine, the theater was demolished in 1998. The last film shown was Titanic.

== Reconstructions ==
In 2003, a Cine Capri-style auditorium was built as part of the Scottsdale 101 theater complex in Phoenix. The 568-seat auditorium had the largest regular movie theater screen in Arizona at over 70 feet (21 m) wide by 30 feet (9.1 m) high, and a 40,000 watt / 150 speaker Digital sound system. The Scottsdale 101 includes a Cine Capri museum which showcases memorabilia and photos from the original Cine Capri.

A second Cine Capri was built in Tempe, Arizona at the new Tempe Marketplace shopping center, along with 15 other movie screens. It is located on the Southwest corner of Loop 101 and Loop 202 Red Mountain. The new stadium-style theater has the same size screen and has 604 seats instead of 568. It pre-opened on June 28, 2007, with a one-night-only showing of the original 1977 Star Wars. The Grand Opening was on June 29, 2007; the opening film was Live Free or Die Hard.

Harkins had operated Cine Capri-style auditoriums at the Bricktown 16 theatre complex in Oklahoma City, Oklahoma, Northfield 18 theaters in Denver, Colorado, and at the Southlake Town Square in Southlake, Texas.

In 2016, Harkins announced that they're planning to re-brand all of the Cine Capri theaters, with the exception of the Scottsdale 101 theater to CINÉ 1, which is now called CINÉ XL. Harkins President, Mike Bowers says the reason for the rebrand is because the Cine Capri name didn't carry as much weight in different states than it does in Arizona. The main auditorium in the Estrella Falls 16 theater in Goodyear was originally going to be another Cine Capri during its construction before it rebranded.

On October 29, 2020, Harkins announced that the Southlake 14 theater in Southlake, Texas, which has a Cine Capri, announced that it will be closing its doors permanently.
