= Reef Net Bay =

Coordinates: 48°33′36″N 122°56′48″W

Reef Net Bay is a bay on Shaw Island in the San Juan Islands of Washington.

The bay was formerly called Squaw Bay. The original name had caused controversy over the racist origins of the term squaw. The present name is after reef nets used by local fishermen.
