= Coronado High School (Arizona) =

Location
- 7501 East Virginia Avenue; Scottsdale, Arizona 85257; United States; 33°28′32″N 111°55′13″W

Information
- Type: Secondary public school
- Established: 1961
- School district: Scottsdale Unified School District
- Principal: Melinda Splitek
- Teaching staff: 47.10 (FTE)
- Grades: 9–12
- Enrollment: 730 (2023-2024)
- Student to teacher ratio: 15.50
- Colors: Scarlet red and navy blue
- Mascot: Don

Coronado High School is a public high school located in Scottsdale, Arizona, USA. The school enrolled 1,044 students in the 2016–2017 school year. Students primarily come from feeder schools in the Scottsdale Unified School District.

== History ==
Coronado High School, named after the Spanish conquistador Francisco Vásquez de Coronado, opened to students in grades 9-12 during fall 1961 as a public comprehensive high school with an emphasis on college preparatory and vocational/technical curriculum. The school mascot is the Coronado Don, don being the name for a Spanish nobleman.

In 2021, Coronado High School became the first Arizona High School to earn NFHS Level 1 and Level 2 status for professional development within the athletic department. That same year, Assistant Principal and Athletic Director Anthony Miller, was awarded the AIA State Administrator of the Year.

== Architecture ==
Ralph Haver, the noted Phoenix mid-century architect, designed the original school, mostly made of pre-cast concrete. Haver also designed numerous public and commercial buildings, as well as tract homes and private residences in Phoenix and Scottsdale, during the 1950s and 1960s. The neighborhood residential community of Town and Country, also featuring classic contemporary ranch style tract homes designed by Haver, was designated as historic by the City of Scottsdale in 2005.

Coronado High was overhauled by DLR Group for the 2008–09 school year, though the white folded plate motif was kept in the new structures as a nod to the former appearance.

== Shield ==
The Heart Shield, the original logo of the school

The Coronado Shield has been a symbol of the school for many years. It was originally designed by Joe Gatti, who also created another symbol of the school, the Seven Arts mosaic on the auditorium. Gatti was an art teacher at Coronado from its opening in 1961 until 1984. He felt that this shield design fit the idea of Coronado's namesake.

== Notable alumni ==
During the Fall of 2019, Coronado High School established their Athletics Hall of Fame under the direction of District Athletic Director, Nathan Slater and site Athletic Director, Anthony Miller. As of 2021, Coronado High School has awarded 41 inductees, including Mr. Slater himself.

- Jesse Valenzuela, lead guitar player and vocalist of The Gin Blossoms
- Kia Zolgharnain, former indoor soccer player

Jon Talton, Seattle Times columnist, former columnist for the Arizona Republic, executive business editor of the Charlotte Observer, assistant managing editor/business of the Cincinnati Enquirer, assistant business editor of the Rocky Mountain News, and novelist.

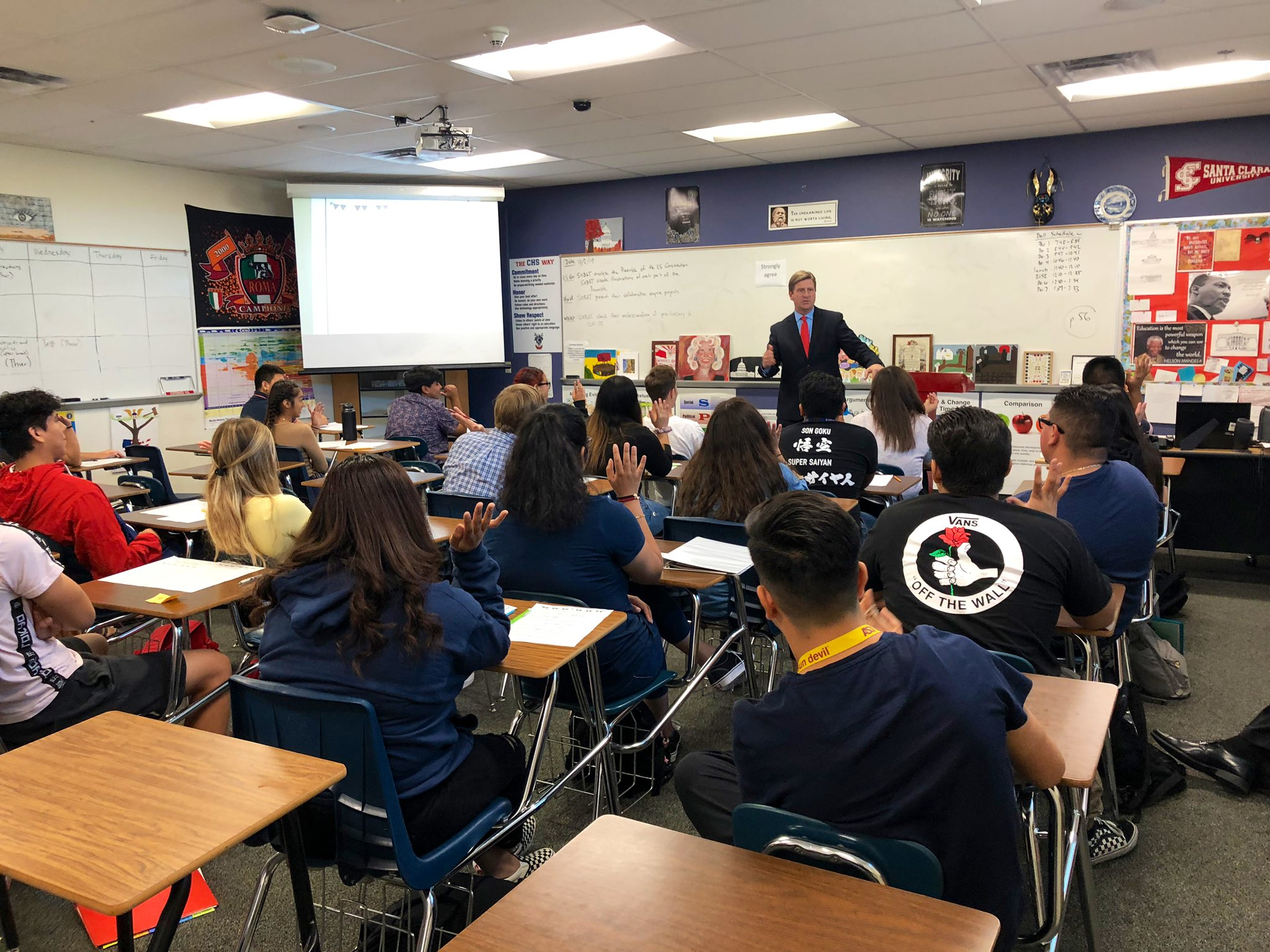
Congressman Greg Stanton speaking at Coronado High School in 2019

== Filming location ==
In the late 1980s, Coronado was used as a film location as a less-expensive alternative to filming in California. It was used as the high school that Bill and Ted attended in Bill and Ted's Excellent Adventure, although the high school in the movie was named San Dimas High School (San Dimas was actually the site of the Bill & Ted sequel). The movie finale (Bill and Ted's final on-stage report with historical figures) was filmed in Coronado's auditorium which was torn down for remodeling in 2006.

Disney used the school twice, as Coronado was the site of filming for ABC's Not Quite Human, a film featuring Jay Underwood, Robyn Lively and Alan Thicke. Another movie, Just Perfect (featuring Jennie Garth), was filmed for the Mickey Mouse Club in 1989. The final football game shown in the movie was actually between Coronado's varsity and junior varsity teams.

The 1985 movie Just One of the Guys, starring Joyce Hyser, was filmed at the now-demolished Scottsdale High School as well as at Coronado High School.

Scenes for the made-for-TV movie "Down Will Come Baby" starring Meredith Baxter was filmed on the campus in 1998.

== Gallery ==
Mosaic of the Seven Arts
