= Ralph Haver =

American architect (1915–1987)

- Ralph Burgess Haver, AIA
- Born: 1915; Pasadena, CA
- Died: August 18, 1987 (aged 71–72); Scottsdale, AZ
- Education: USC Pasadena
- Occupation: Architect
- Practice: Ralph Haver & Associates; Haver, Nunn & Associates; Haver, Nunn & Jenson; Haver, Nunn & Nelson; Haver, Nunn & Collamer
- Buildings: Cine Capri, Coronado High School, Phoenix College

Ralph Haver (1915–1987) was an American architect working in metropolitan Phoenix, Arizona from 1945 until the early 1980s. Haver designed the Mid-Century Modern Haver Homes, affordable tract housing executed in a contemporary modern style.

== Biography ==
Born in California and trained at USC Pasadena as an architect, Haver arrived in Phoenix immediately after his service in World War II and began working with his brother Robert (a builder) and father Harry (a brick mason). He settled in what would soon become Uptown Phoenix — two miles outside city boundaries at the time. His first set of experimental modern contemporary ranch homes was built in the Hixson Homes subdivision near 12th Street and Highland—now called Canal North.

He soon mentored under Ed Varney and remained lifelong friends and collaborators with him even after breaking off and creating his own firm. Ralph Haver is responsible for so much of the design of postwar Phoenix that he ranked among the largest firms of the time. He designed churches, schools, municipal buildings, malls, multifamily housing, tract housing and custom homes. Haver especially worked with prominent housing developers, including Del Webb, Fred Woodward, David Friedman and Dell Trailor.

Haver's Cine Capri theater was razed in the 1990s, and the 1960 Coronado High School was largely demolished by 2007. The Polynesian-styled Kon Tiki motel, an icon along Van Buren Avenue, was also demolished.

== Haver Homes ==
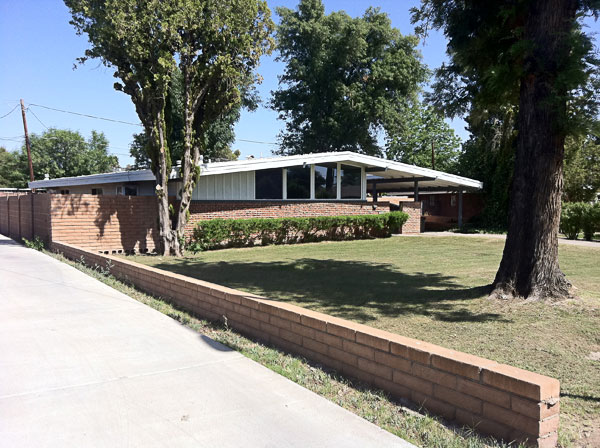
One of Ralph Haver's most successful home designs was the Town and Country model, characterized by its low sloped roofline, weeping mortar brick and "patio port"

It was estimated by the firm that there are 20,000 Haver designed tract homes in Arizona, New Mexico and Colorado. Haver Home characteristics include low-sloped rooflines, clerestory windows, massive mantle-less chimney volumes, floor-to-ceiling walls of glass, brick or block construction, clinker bricks in the wainscoting, angled porch posts and brick patios. Homes are typically less than 1400 square feet and significantly less in the postwar era due to federal mandate in conservation of materials.

== Documents destroyed ==
Blueprints as verification for authenticity of Haver designs are rare, as many buildings were created outside of Phoenix city boundaries at the time. Many of Haver's drawings, renderings and records were destroyed in 1993 when the firm finally went out of business—they ended up in a dumpster when the last office built and designed by the firm on 16th Street was abated.

== Expansion ==
From the early 1960s and 1970s Haver and Nunn's firm expanded outside of AZ with offices in Hawaii. Guam, San Francisco and Minneapolis. Haver retired in the early 1980s and the firm continued to operate from the new office building on North 16th Street. Ralph Haver died in 1987. In 1993, shortly after partner George Collamer died the firm was closed. Jimmie Nunn is the last surviving partner and lives in Flagstaff, Arizona.

== Projects ==
Haver designed, or collaborated in the design of, the following buildings and neighborhoods in Arizona, among others. Most of the inventory has been discovered from oral history and publications such as Arizona Architect, Arizona Days & Ways, Arizona Homes and A Guide to the Architecture of Metro Phoenix (Central Arizona AIA).

- 1946 Hixon Homes/Canal North, Phoenix, AZ (includes the original Haver family home and several other experiments)
- 1949 Country Club Apartments, Phoenix, AZ
- 1950 Luke Air Force Base Housing
- 1950 The Peggy Reed Residence, Ingleside Country Club, Phoenix, AZ
- 1950 The Nelson Residence, Uptown Phoenix, AZ
- 1950 The Morse Residence, Phoenix, AZ
- 1951 KoKo Night Club, Phoenix, AZ (destroyed by fire)
- 1952 Began Partnership with Jimmie Nunn
- 1952 Feltman Building, Scottsdale, AZ (now Pima Plaza)
- 195? Haver and Nunn office building, Phoenix, AZ (razed)
- 1952 Princess Homes at Northwood, Phoenix, AZ
- 1953 Entz White Lumber, Phoenix, AZ
- 1953 Marlen Grove neighborhood, Phoenix, AZ
- 1953 G.E. Wonder Home, Paradise Valley, AZ
- 1953 Campus Homes, Tempe, AZ (?)
- 1954 Friedman Office Building, Phoenix, AZ (now Red Modern Furniture)
- 1954 Lou Regester Furniture, Phoenix, AZ (now Copenhagen Imports)
- 1954 Starlite Vista neighborhood, Phoenix, AZ
- 1955 Tonka Vista homes, Phoenix, AZ (including new Haver family home and other experiments)
- 195? Madison Rose Lane Elementary School, Phoenix, AZ
- 195? Madison #2 elementary school, Phoenix, AZ
- 1954 Quebedeaux Chevrolet, Phoenix, AZ (with Victor Gruen)
- 1955 Windemere neighborhood, Phoenix, AZ
- 1955 Park Lee Alice Apartments, Phoenix, AZ
- 1956 Engineering Center, ASU (with expansions through 1963) Tempe, AZ
- 1956 Starlite Model Home for Parade of Homes, Phoenix, AZ
- 1956 Tower Plaza, Phoenix, AZ (with John Schotanus)
- 1957 Town & Country Manor (aka Rancho Ventura and T&C I) neighborhood, Phoenix, AZ
- 1957 Princess Homes at Regents Park in Arcadia, Phoenix, AZ
- 1957 Barrow's Furniture Store, Tucson, AZ
- 1957 PAT Dona Vista of Terra del Sol, Tucson, AZ
- 1958 PAT Craycroft Terrace, Tucson, AZ
- 1958 PAT Grande Vista of Terra del Sol, Tucson, AZ
- 1958 PAT Mayfair Terrace, Tucson, AZ
- 1958 Holiday Park Apartments, Scottsdale, AZ
- 1958 Saint Vincent de Paul Catholic Church & School, Phoenix, AZ
- 1958 Janet Manor (Town & Country II) Phoenix, AZ
- 1958 Parker House, Arcadia, Phoenix, AZ
- 1959 Evertson House, Marion Estates, Phoenix, AZ
- 1959 Town & Country III neighborhood, Scottsdale, AZ
- 1959 Social Sciences Building, ASU, Tempe, AZ
- 1959 Mayflower Apartments, Phoenix, AZ (now Paradise Palms Apartments)
- 1959 PAT Craycroft Village Apartments, Tucson, AZ
- 1959 PAT Alamo Terrace, Tucson, AZ
- 1959 PAT Eastridge Terrace, Tucson, AZ
- 1959 VP Value Packed Homes, Santa Rita Terrace, Tucson, AZ (for Chesin Construction Co.)
- 1959 Hohokam Elementary School, Scottsdale, AZ
- 1960 Scottsdale City Hall, Scottsdale, AZ (now Triangle Building)
- 1960 Sheppard of the Valley Lutheran Church, Phoenix, AZ (partially razed)
- 1960 Town and Country Paradise (T&C IV) Phoenix, AZ
- 1960 Coronado High School, Scottsdale, AZ (mostly razed)
- 1961 Villa Monterey Casitas 1-4, Scottsdale, AZ (Dave Friedman's, Butler Homes. Placed on the Scottsdale Historic Register, 2011)
- 1961 Former Arizona Bank branch at 4231 East Thomas, Phoenix, AZ
- 1961 Fraternity on ASU's Greek Row, Tempe, AZ (razed)
- 1961 Kon Tiki Motel, Phoenix, AZ (razed)
- 1961 4747 Medical Building, Phoenix, AZ (razed)
- 1961 3308 Medical Building, Phoenix, AZ (significantly altered)
- 1962 Haver Office Building on Missouri, Phoenix, AZ
- 1962 Kaibab Elementary School, Scottsdale, AZ (AIA Special Feature Citation) (razed)
- 1960s Phoenix College additions, Phoenix, AZ
- 1963 First Federal Savings & Loan, Scottsdale, AZ (AIA Award of Merit) (razed)
- 1963 Barrow's Furniture Store, Tucson, AZ (AIA Award of Merit, AIA Honor Award)
- 1963 Arizona Bank branch 16th Street, Phoenix, AZ (AIA Award of Merit)
- 1963 Phoenix Municipal Bldg, Phoenix, AZ (in collaboration with Ed Varney, won an AIA award)
- 1963 Engineering Complex expansion, ASU, Tempe, AZ
- 1964 Polynesian Dary Queen, Scottsdale, AZ
- 1964 Polynesian Plaza, Scottsdale, AZ (razed)
- 1964 Cine Capri Theater, Phoenix, AZ (with Henry G. Greene) (razed)
- 1964 Arizona Bank branch at 6015 North 16th Street, Phoenix, AZ
- 1964 Mayo's Furniture Store aka "Bruners"
- 1964 Golden Keys Townhouses, Scottsdale, AZ (for homebuilder Dell Trailor)
- 1964 Sutton Place Townhouses, Phoenix, AZ (for homebuilder Dell Trailor)
- 1965 Hilton Hotel at Scottsdale Rd & Lincoln, Scottsdale, AZ
- 1965 Beekman Place Townhouses, Phoenix, AZ (for homebuilder Dell Trailor)
- 1965 C. S. Wo Building, Honolulu, HI (now Heald Community College)
- 1966 Anapuni Street Apartments, Honolulu, HI
- 1966 Revlon Manufacturing Plant, Phoenix, AZ
- 1966 Goldblatt's Home Center, Chicago, IL
- 1966 Villa d'Este Townhouses, Scottsdale, AZ (for homebuilder Dell Trailor)
- 1967 Paradise Valley United Methodist Church, Paradise Valley, AZ
- 1968 Hacienda Hermosa Townhouses, Litchfield Park, AZ (for Knoell Homebuilders)
- 1968 Royale Gardens Townhouses, Scottsdale, AZ (for homebuilder Dell Trailor)
- 1969 Hillcrest Townhouses, Phoenix, AZ (for homebuilder Dell Trailor)
- 1969 American Express Complex, Phoenix, AZ
- 1960s Sunrise Park Resort Recreation Center, Apache County, AZ
- 1960s Van's Furniture Store, Honolulu, HI
- 1970 Health Professions Building, NAU, Flagstaff, AZ
- 1970 Villa Adrian Townhouses, Scottsdale, AZ (for homebuilder Dell Trailor)
- 1971 Avenida Hermosa Condos, Phoenix, AZ
- 1973 Casa Hermosa Condos, Phoenix, AZ
- 1973 Sentry Center, Scottsdale, AZ
- 1973 Rio Verde Country Club Clubhouse, Rio Verde, AZ
- 1974 Fontana Racquet Club, Fountain Hills, AZ
- 1974 Inarajan Junior High School, Inarajan, Guam
- 1975 Neal Aspera Residence, Tempe, AZ
- 1977 Metro Home Furnishing Center, Phoenix, AZ (now Metro Towne Center)
- 1978 Addition to Arizona State Land Building, Phoenix, AZ
- 1978 Escondido Custom Homes, Escondido, CA
- 1979 Classroom Office Building, ASU, Tempe, AZ (now the Schwada Classroom and Office Building)
- 1979 Pueblo Bonita duplexes, Phoenix, AZ
- 1980 North Phoenix Baptist Church, Phoenix, AZ
- 1981 Salt River Project Administration Building, Phoenix, AZ
- 1981 Intel Deer Valley Facility, Phoenix, AZ
- 1981 Valley National Bank office, Flagstaff, AZ (now Chase Bank)
- 1982 Universal Homes Corporate Office, Phoenix, AZ
- 1982 Haver Office Building 16th St. North of Glendale Ave. Phoenix, AZ
- 1981 Haver came out of retirement to collaborate with HNC on the remodel of the Scottsdale Hilton Hotel
- 1983 Rams Hill Townhouses, Borrego Springs, CA - George Collamer project (no Haver involvement)
- 1986 Four Haver Family custom homes: Mesa, Carefree, Phoenix, and Cave Creek

== See Also ==
- List of American architects
