= Garcia School =

- U.S. National Register of Historic Places
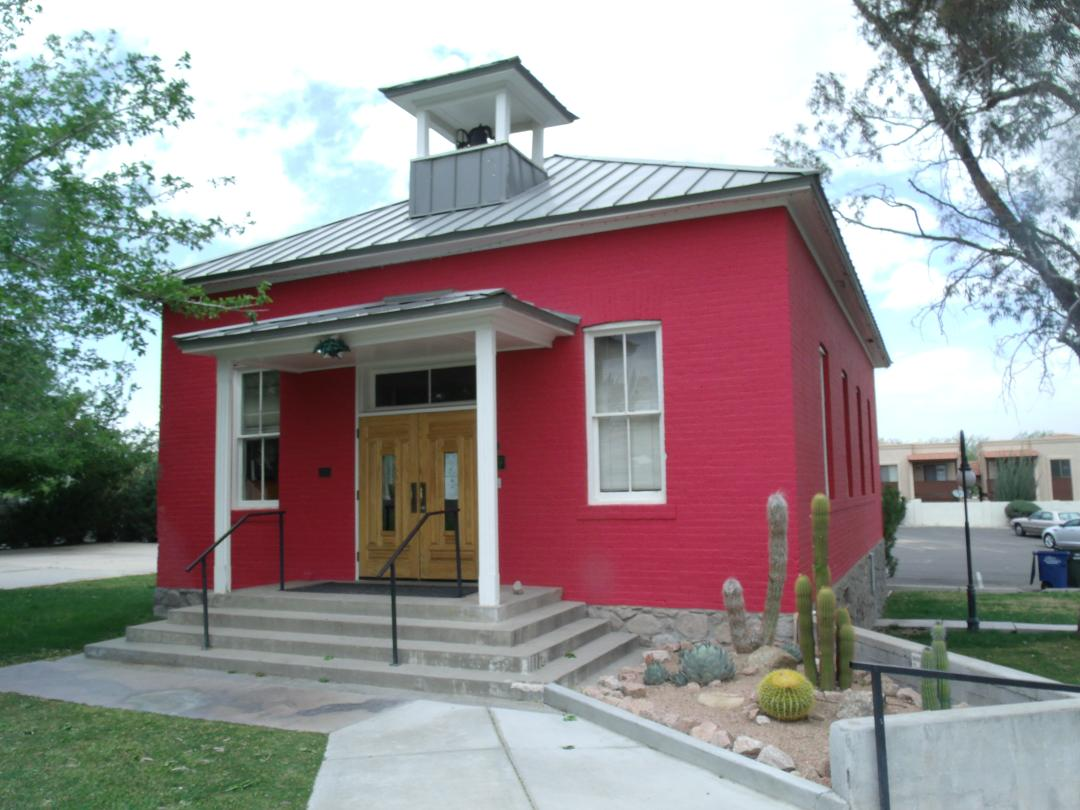
- The Garcia School in 2013.

- Location within Arizona
- Location: 245 N. Tegner Street, Wickenburg, Arizona, United States
- Coordinates: 33°58′15.40″N 112°43′56.07″W
- Built: 1905
- NRHP reference No.: 82002087
- Added to NRHP: April 1, 1982

The Garcia School is a historic school building in Wickenburg, Arizona, and is considered to be the best example of a brick one-room schoolhouse surviving in the state.

The Garcia School, also known as the Little Red Schoolhouse or the Garcia Little Red Schoolhouse, was built of red brick in 1905 for the Wickenburg School District on land donated by a local pioneer named Don Ignacio Garcia, who is now considered to be the "father of Wickenburg education". It replaced a small wooden schoolhouse that was moved from Vulture City, Arizona, in 1895, and cost $1,600 to build.

The Garcia School was used by students until as late as the 1970s and was added to the National Register of Historic Places on April 1, 1982. It was badly burned in a fire in 1978, but was restored in 1984 and used as a Community Bank of Arizona building until 2003, when it was donated to the Wickenburg Cultural Organization (WCO). It is now used as a local history museum, the office for the WCO, and by the Wickenburg Chamber Orchestra for musical education.

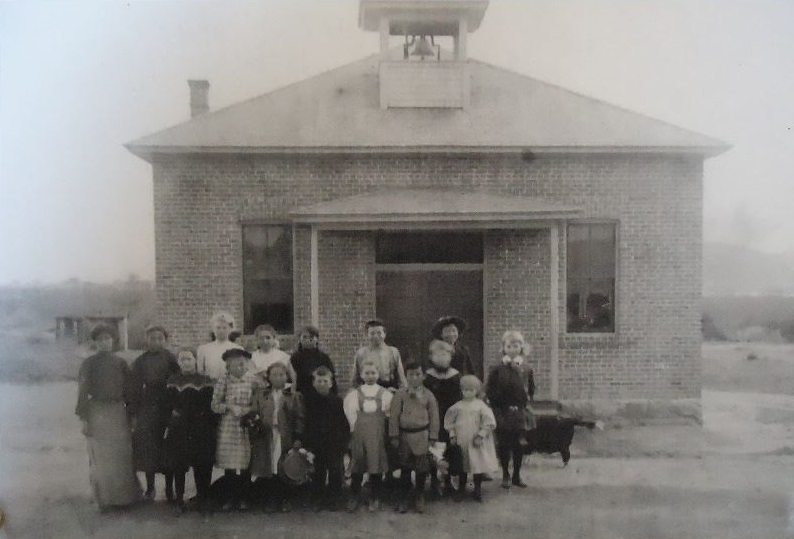
An early photo of the students and the schoolhouse, c. 1910.

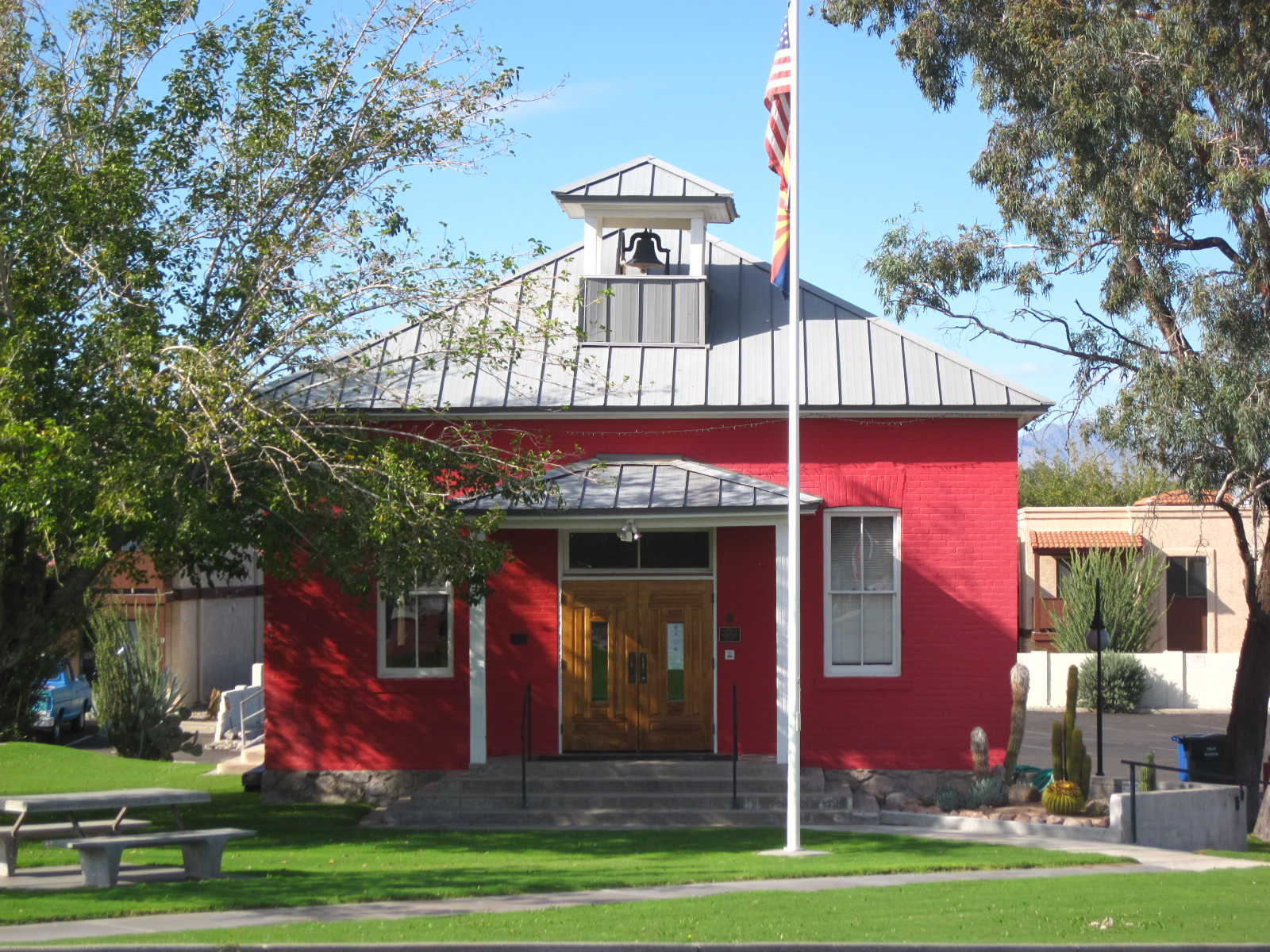
The Garcia School in 2014.

== See also ==
- Little Red Schoolhouse
- National Register of Historic Places in Maricopa County, Arizona
