= Scottsdale Unified School District =

School district in Arizona, United States

Location
- Scottsdale, surrounding areas Arizona United States

District information
- Type: Public
- Grades: Pre K-12
- Established: 1896
- Superintendent: Dr. Scott A. Menzel

Other information
- Website: www.susd.org

The Scottsdale Unified School District (SUSD) is a school district with its headquarters in Scottsdale, Arizona. The 112-square-mile (290 km^{2}) district serves most of Scottsdale, most of Paradise Valley, a portion of Phoenix, and a portion of Tempe.

Its 22 schools earning the state's highest rating, Excelling. All SUSD schools are rated as Performing, Performing Plus, Highly Performing or Excelling by the Arizona Department of Education.

== History ==
The Scottsdale Unified School District was founded in 1896 by Mayor Winfield Scott, also the founder of the city of Scottsdale. The first classes were taught by Alza Blount, who, for health reasons, moved to Arizona from Illinois with her husband George and their three children. Classes were held in their adobe home, which was just south of what is now Civic Center Plaza and Second Street. Alza Blount was paid $40 a month to teach the 8-10 students from the seven families who resided in Scottsdale at that time.

The district's first bond election was held May 1, 1909, with all 13 citizens voting "yes". The amount of the bond, $5,000, was used to build the district's first school, now known as the "Little Red Schoolhouse." This building, also known at the time as Coronado School, is a historic site on Scottsdale Mall and now the home of the Scottsdale Historical Society.

Prior to 1974 the district enrolled students of the Salt River Pima–Maricopa Indian Community reservation, but that year ceased doing so.

Today, the district covers 112 square miles (290 km^{2}), including some areas not part of the City of Scottsdale itself; specifically, the district includes most of the town of Paradise Valley and parts of Tempe and Phoenix in addition to most of Scottsdale. The district has about 22,000 students and approximately 1,800 certified and 1,000 classified employees; five comprehensive high schools, six middle schools, three K-8 schools, sixteen elementary schools, and one alternative school.

== Schools ==
=== High schools ===
The original Scottsdale High School operated from 1922 until 1983.

- Arcadia High School
- Chaparral High School
- Coronado High School
- Desert Mountain High School
- Saguaro High School
- Scottsdale Online Learning

=== K-8 schools ===
K-8 schools include:

- Cheyenne Traditional School
- Copper Ridge School

=== Middle schools ===
- Cocopah Middle School
- Desert Canyon Middle School
- Ingleside Middle School
- Mohave Middle School
- Mountainside Middle School
- Tonalea Middle School

=== Elementary schools ===
- Anasazi Elementary School
- Cherokee Elementary School
- Cochise Elementary School
- Desert Canyon Elementary School
- Hohokam Elementary School
- Hopi Elementary School
- Kiva Elementary School
- Laguna Elementary School
  - In October 2026 the Scottsdale school board voted to close Laguna Elementary School ("Laguna Prep") citing rising costs, increased cost of living in Scottsdale, and declining enrollment. The school district moved Laguna students to Anasazi or Redfield for the 2027–2028 academic year.
- Navajo Elementary School
- Pueblo Elementary School
- Redfield Elementary School
- Sequoya Elementary School
- Tavan Elementary School
- Yavapai Elementary School
  - By 1990 a media center opened that John Schroeder of The Arizona Republic described as "state-of-the-art". That year, the U.S. Department of Education gave the school the recognition award for the 1989-1990 school year.

== Former schools ==
- Supai Middle School - The first building was built in 1959 for around $10 million. In 2002, The Arizona Republic printed an editorial in favor of remodeling the school.
- Aztec Elementary School - Aztec opened in 1993 and was closed in 2009 as part of a downsizing initiative for the district. The students were merged with Zuni elementary school and Cheyenne Traditional K-8 School relocated to the site occupied by Aztec.
- Zuni Elementary School - Zuni opened in 1989 and was closed in 2009 as part of the merger with Aztec elementary. After the merging, the new school changed its name to Redfield Elementary School.
- Copper Ridge K-8 and Laguna Prep - In October 2026, the district's governing board voted to close both schools by the end of the 2027-2028 school year as part of a school consolidation plan prompted by declining enrollment and budget concerns.
