= Harkins Theatres =

American movie theater chain

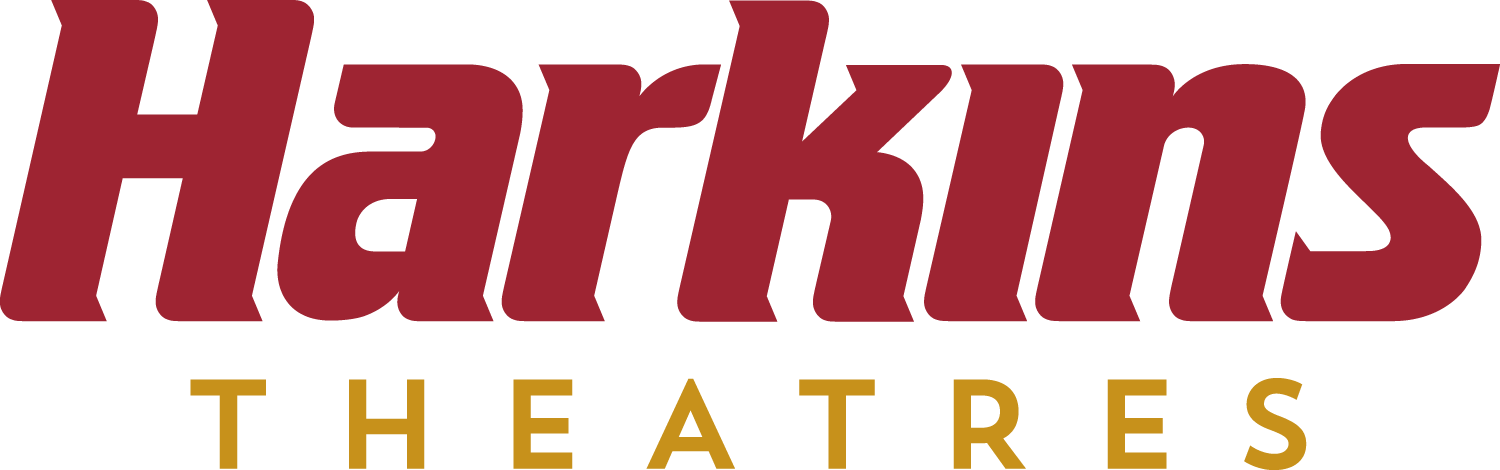
- Type: Private subsidiary of Harkins Enterprises
- Industry: Entertainment (movie theaters)
- Founded: 1933
- Founder: Dwight "Red" Harkins
- Headquarters: Scottsdale, Arizona
- Number of locations: 35 theatres with 487 screens (2023)
- Area served: Arizona, California, Colorado and Oklahoma
- Key people: Mike Bowers, CEO
- Owner: Dan Harkins
- Number of employees: about 3,000 (as of May 2009)
- Parent: Harkins Enterprises, LLC
- Website: Official Website

Harkins Theatres is an American movie theater chain with locations throughout the Southwestern United States. Harkins Theatres is privately owned and operated by its parent company, Harkins Enterprises, LLC. The company operates 35 theaters with 487 screens throughout Arizona, California, Colorado, and Oklahoma. It is the 7th largest movie theater circuit in North America and the largest family-owned theater chain in the United States.

== History ==
=== Founding ===
In 1931, at the age of 16, Dwight "Red" Harkins left Cincinnati, Ohio, for Los Angeles, California hoping to become involved in the film scene there. However, by the time he arrived in Tempe, Arizona, he could no longer afford to reach Los Angeles. In 1933, he opened the State Theatre in Tempe, which was originally the Goodwin Opera House that opened in 1907.

=== Early years ===
In 1934, Red Harkins built an outdoor theater in Tempe Beach Park, which lasted for only one summer. In 1940 Harkins built the College Theater (later Harkins Valley Art).

The last theater opened by Red Harkins was the "Camelview 5" theater in 1973. The Camelview 5 closed down in December 2015 and the "Camelview at Fashion Square" location opened as a 14-theater space in the Scottsdale Fashion Square mall.

=== Dan Harkins ===
In 1974, Dwight Harkins died, leaving the company to his wife, Viola. Dwight had 6 children. The company was near bankruptcy at that time. After reworking the company, Dwight's fourth son Dan expanded the theatre chain from five locations in the Phoenix, Arizona area to 33 locations in four states - Oklahoma, Colorado, Arizona, and Southern California. The Southlake, Texas location was operational until November 2, 2020.

Being unable to secure many first-run movies caused Harkins Theatres to experience financial difficulties. Dan Harkins sued a group of movie distributors in 1977, claiming they had stopped him from scheduling a number of high-profile first-run films. After Harkins won the lawsuit, the chain was able to show a run of the 1940 Walt Disney animated film Fantasia in May 1982, starting a string of successful releases.

Dan Harkins has won several awards for his work in the exhibitor industry and his community involvement.

- Phoenix Film Festival Visionary Award (2010)
- Arizona Culture Keepers (2010)
- United Motion Picture Association of America National Showman of the Year (1976, 1980 & 1982)
- American Institute of Architects Community Vision Award (1996)

=== Expansion ===
In the early 1990s, Harkins acquired several theaters operated by Mann Theatres. Most of the theaters acquired were a result of a lawsuit.

In 1988, Harkins re-opened the Cine Capri theater in Phoenix. The original Cine Capri was the largest screen in Arizona, measuring more than 70 feet (21 m) long. Despite over 200,000 signatures in a preservation effort led primarily by KTAR's Pat McMahon, the theater was demolished in 1998.

In 2003, a newer version of the Cine Capri theater opened at the Scottsdale 101 14 multiplex. Harkins Theatres also built Cine Capri auditoriums at its Bricktown 16 (Oklahoma City, OK), Northfield 18 (Denver, CO), Southlake 14 (Southlake, TX) and Tempe Marketplace 16 (Tempe, AZ) locations. The Southlake 14 location would close in 2020.

In November 2004, Harkins opened its Yuma Palms 14 location in Yuma, Arizona. The first film shown at this location was The Polar Express. In 2006, they opened its Chino Hills 18 location in Chino Hills, California, its second location in California. On May 5, 2016, they opened its Cerritos 16 location in Cerritos, California.

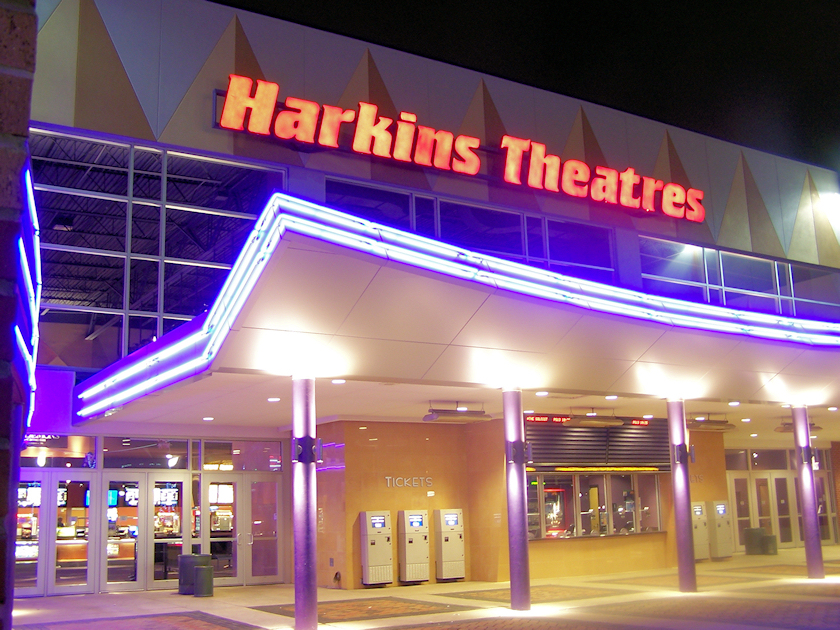
Harkins Theatre Bricktown 16 in Oklahoma City, OK.

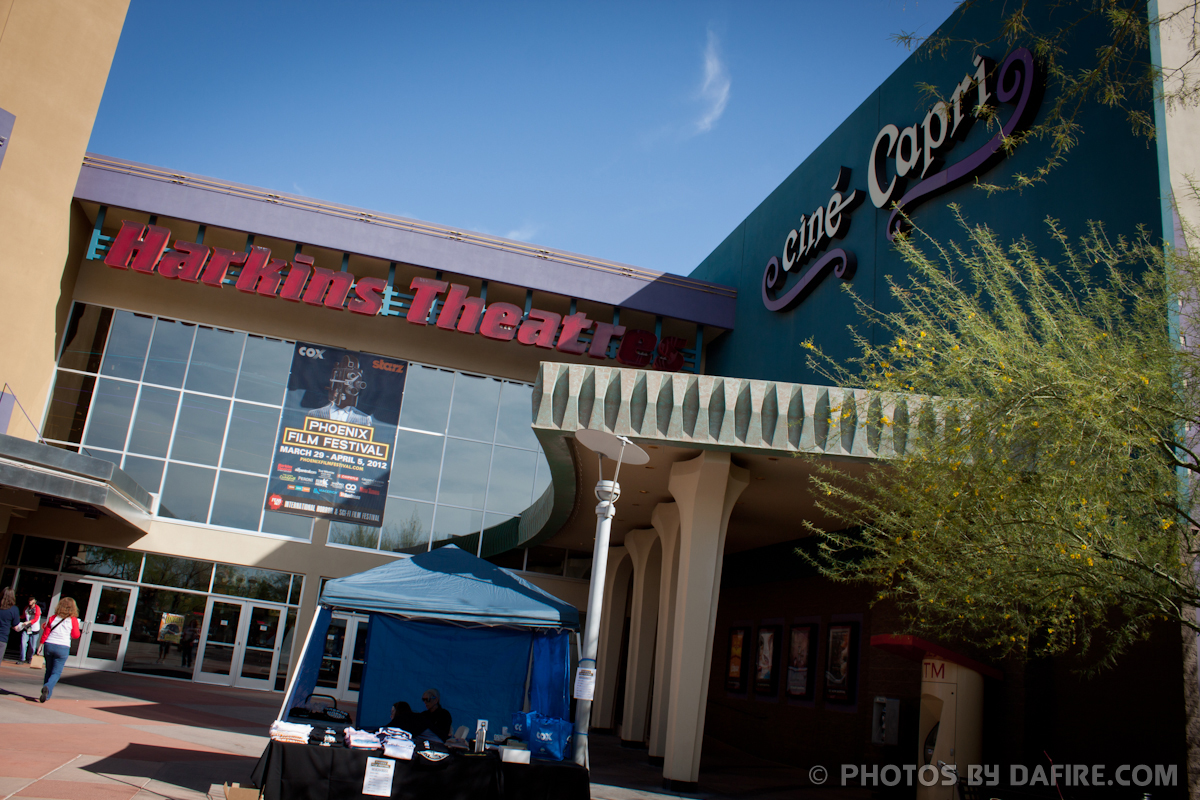
Harkins Scottsdale 101 14 in Phoenix, AZ during the Phoenix Film Festival.

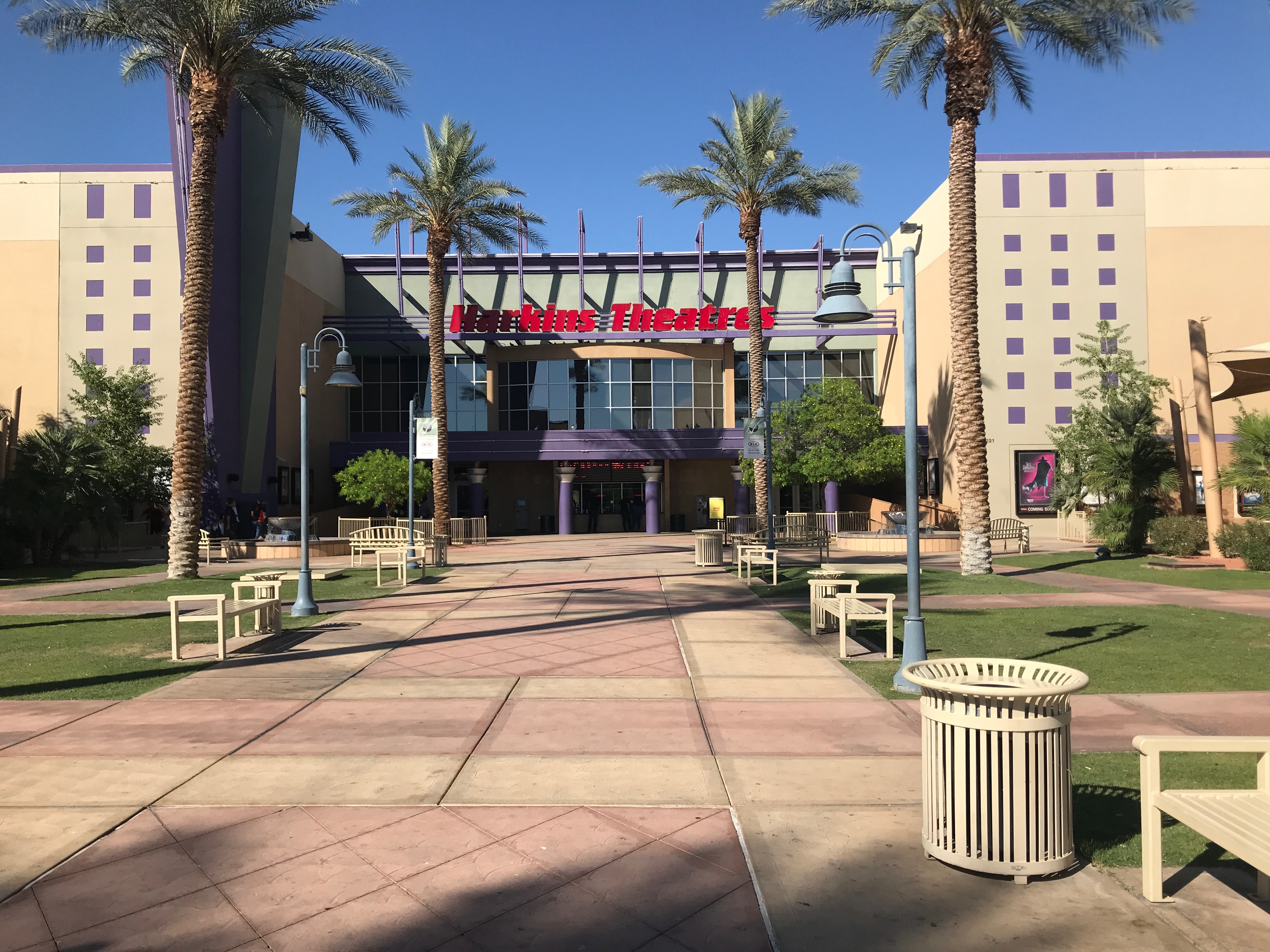
Harkins Yuma Palms 14 in Yuma, AZ.

In 2023, with the closure and bulldozing of Metrocenter Mall in Phoenix, Harkins Metro 12 was also permanently closed on May 29 after 31 years in operation. According to William Olson, senior executive vice-president for Concord Wilshire Companies and project leader for the Metrocenter redevelopment, a new version of the theater will be considered.

In 2023, Harkins announced that they are opening up a "new family entertainment concept" in North Phoenix called BackLot in 2024. Themed after movie backlots, it will include a restaurant with a bar, a sports-viewing area, bowling lanes, an outdoor patio, and immersive virtual-reality experiences.

== Premium formats ==
- IMAX: Harkins has one IMAX location, which is located at Arizona Mills. On December 10, 2009, Harkins Theatres began to lease the IMAX theater and the first movie to be shown in the acquired theater was Avatar in IMAX 3D.
- CINÉ XL: Formally known as CINÉ 1, it is Harkins' premium large format. CINÉ XL provides Dolby Atmos sound, with a 4K laser projection. In 2016, Harkins announced that all Cine Capri reconstructions with the exception of the Scottsdale 101 theater to be rethemed. In 2018, Harkins announced that the biggest screen in select theaters would be retrofitted to CINÉ XL.
- 4D E-Motion: In March 2026, Harkins announced a partnership with Lumma to install 4D theaters in a few theaters around the chain. The first 4D E-Motion opened in August at the Norterra location in north Phoenix.
- CINÉ Grill: Harkins’ dine-in theater concept with a scratch kitchen for food delivered to guests in theater. These theaters also include an indoor/outdoor cocktail bar, lounge and outdoor patio.

== Art and independent film ==
The Harkins Art Film Society brings art and independent films to the theater chain. Harkins Valley Art and Harkins Camelview at Fashion Square 14 are dedicated to foreign and independent films.

Harkins Theatres hosts several film festivals each year.

- The Phoenix Film Festival – Harkins Theatres Scottsdale 101 (Scottsdale, Arizona)
- The Scottsdale International Film Festival – Harkins Theatres Shea 14 (Scottsdale, Arizona)
- The Greater Phoenix Jewish Film Festival – Harkins Theatres Camelview at Fashion Square 14 (Scottsdale, Arizona)
- DeadCENTER Film Festival – Harkins Theatres Bricktown 16 (Oklahoma City, Oklahoma)
