= Little Red Schoolhouse (Beyerville, Arizona) =

Historic schoolhouse in Santa Cruz County, Arizona

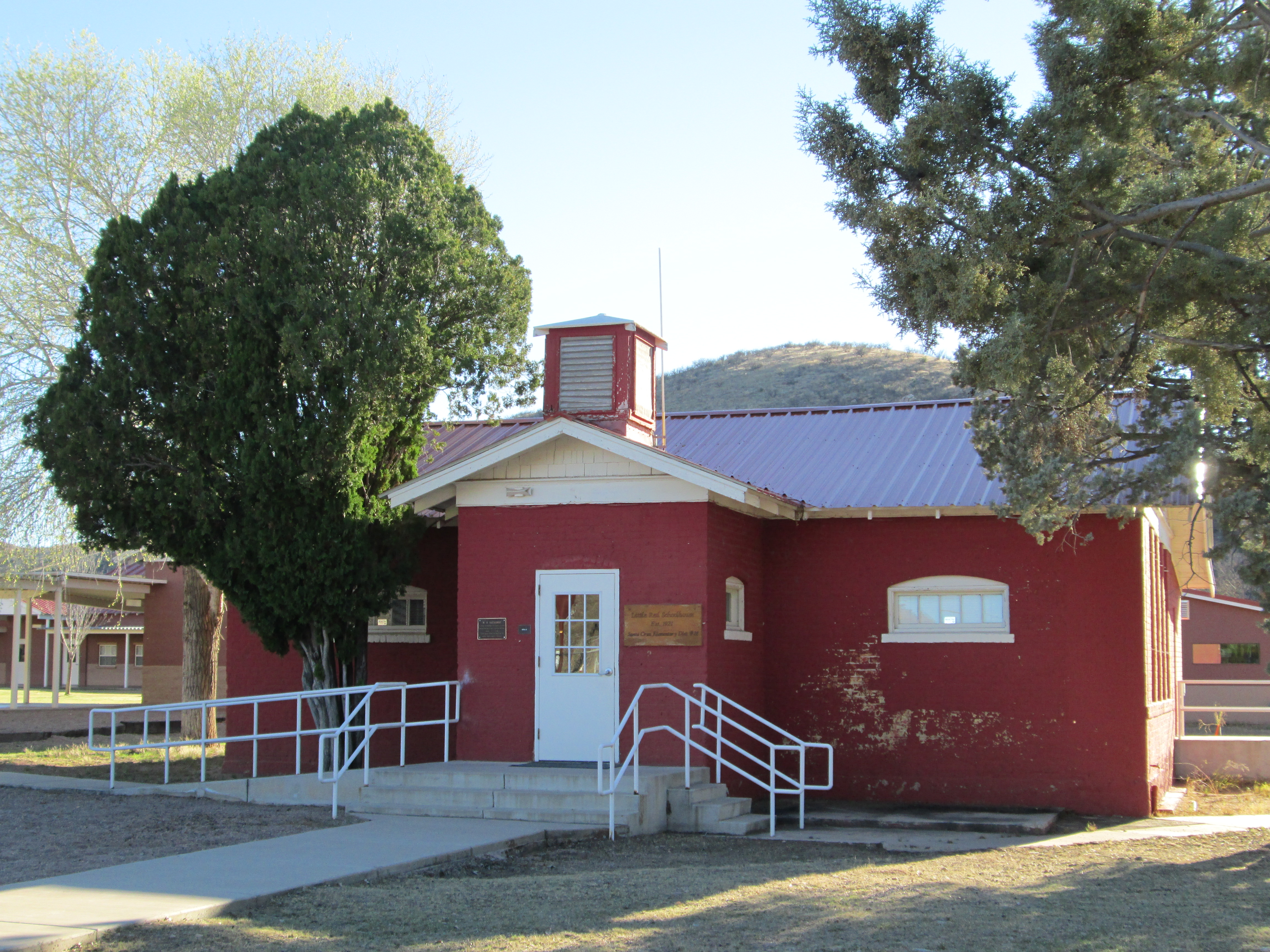
- The Little Red Schoolhouse in 2015.

- Location within Arizona
- Former names: Santa Cruz Schoolhouse

General information
- Location: 7 Duquesne Road; Beyerville, Arizona, US
- Coordinates: 31°23′16″N 110°52′19″W
- Completed: 1921

References
- U.S. Geological Survey Geographic Names Information System: Little Red School Elementary

The Little Red Schoolhouse is a historic one-room schoolhouse located a few miles northeast of Nogales, Arizona, in the community of Beyerville. Opened in 1921 by the Santa Cruz Elementary District to serve the children of local farmers and ranchers, the Little Red Schoolhouse is the only one remaining of approximately two dozen red schoolhouses built in the Santa Cruz River valley in the 1920s.

Next to the historic Little Red Schoolhouse is the modern Little Red Schoolhouse elementary school, a larger K–8 facility for the Santa Cruz Elementary District that replaced the original schoolhouse.

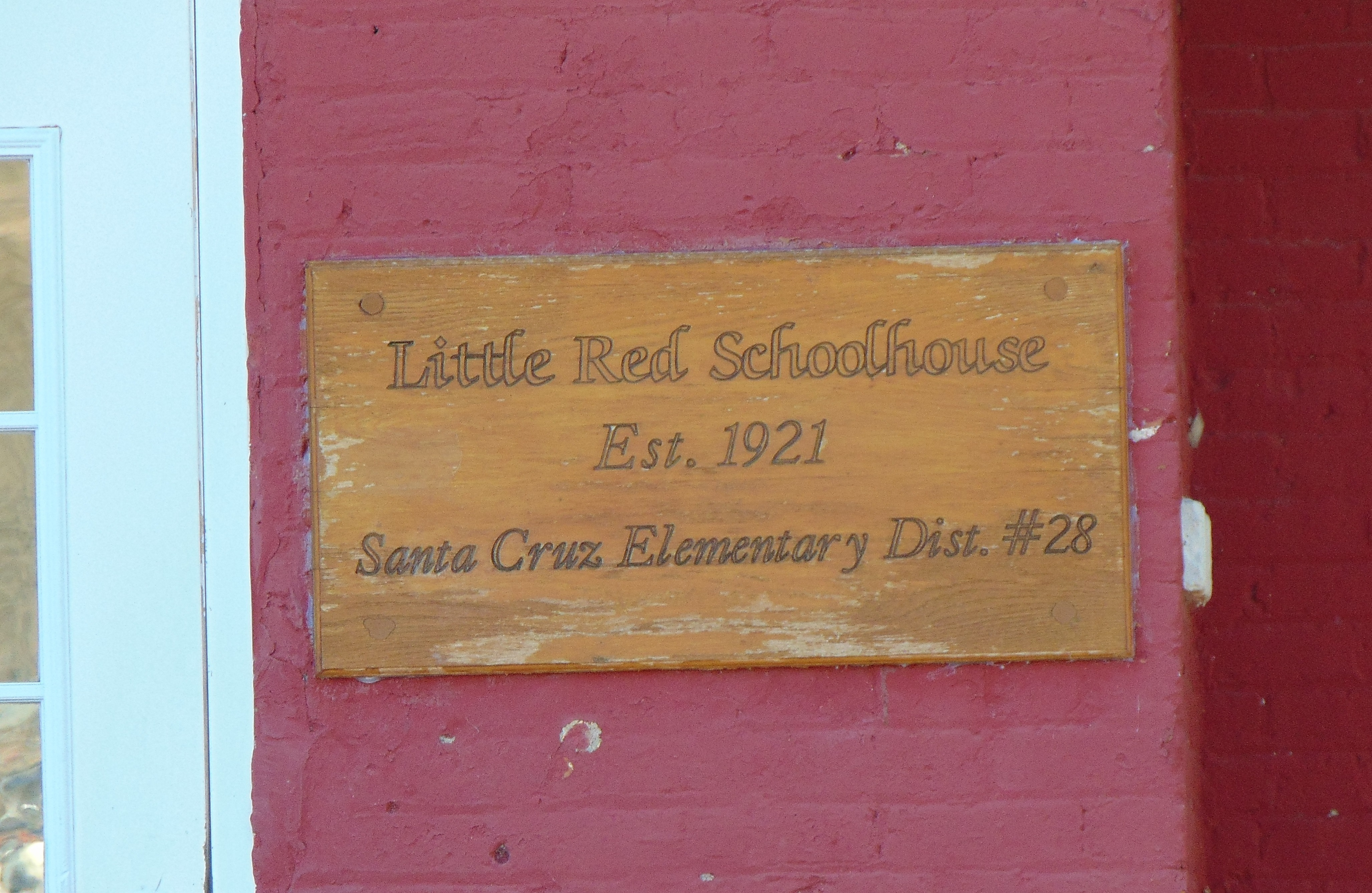
A plaque at the front of the Little Red Schoolhouse.

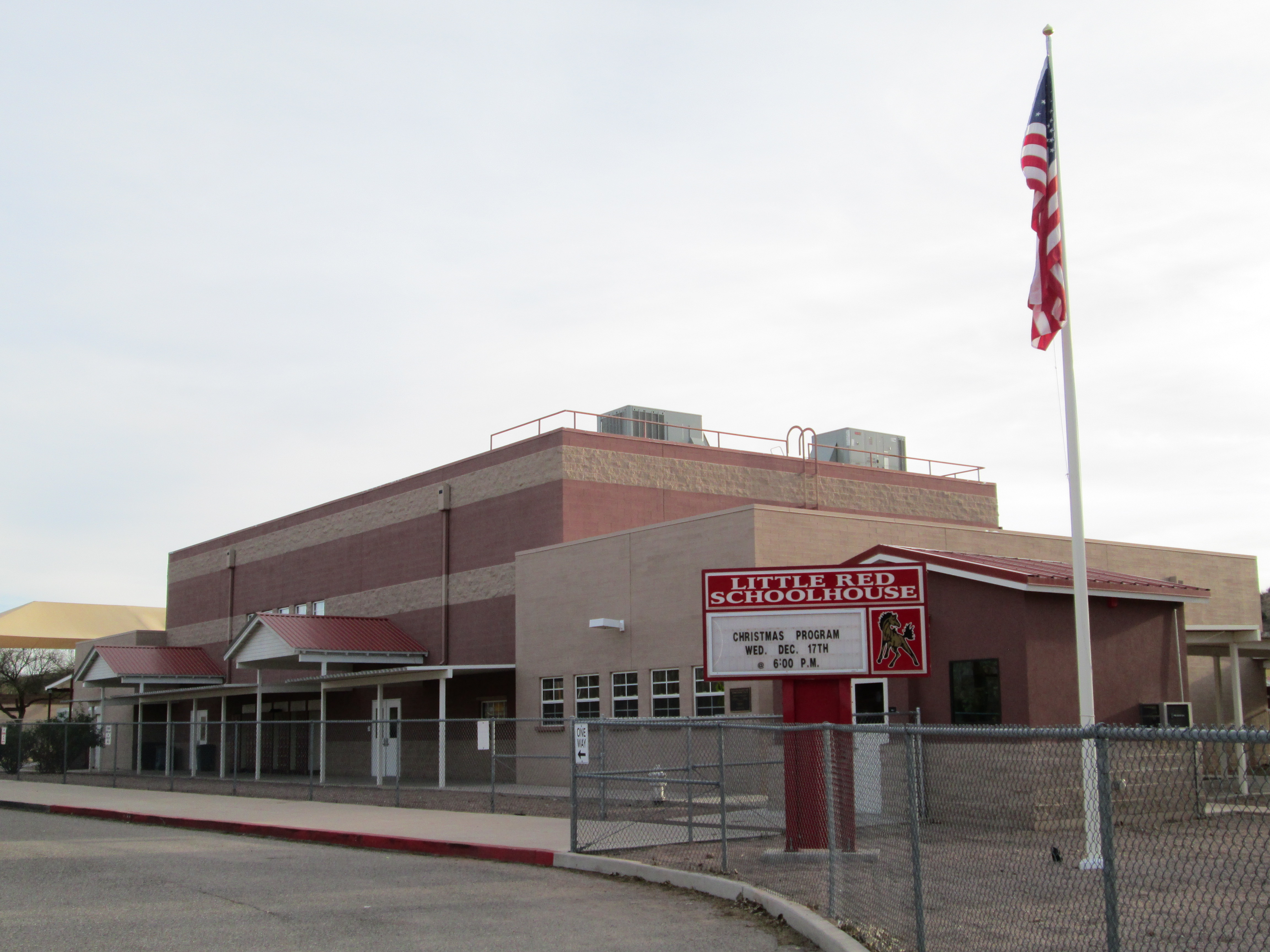
The modern facility next to the historic schoolhouse.

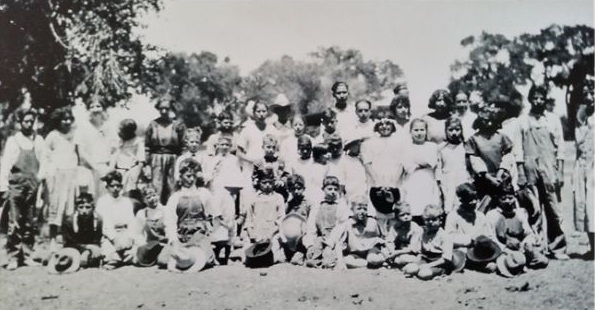
The students and teachers of the Little Red Schoolhouse in 1921.

== See also ==
- Little Red Schoolhouse (Scottsdale, Arizona)
- The Little Outfit Schoolhouse
- Ranch school
