= Scottsdale High School =

Former high school in Scottsdale, Arizona, United States

Location
- Arizona; United States; 33°29′48″N 111°55′23″W

Information
- Established: 1923
- Closed: 1983
- School district: Scottsdale Unified School District
- Enrollment: 1226 (1983)
- Colors: Orange and black
- Mascot: Beavers

Scottsdale High School was a high school in Scottsdale, Arizona, located at Indian School Road and 74th Street. It opened in 1923 and closed in May 1983. The school site was demolished, and the land was redeveloped for commercial use.

The school graduated its first class of students in 1923; two of the three were siblings, Bill and Murle Miller, the children of Charles L. Miller, a state legislator and civic figure whose family had donated the 10-acre (4.0 ha) parcel for the establishment of the school.

By the early 1980s, enrollment in the Scottsdale Unified School District was declining; the district's then-superintendent, Philip Gates, was in favor of closing Arcadia High School instead, but it was Scottsdale that was shuttered by a 3–2 board vote in January 1983, as its property value of $10 to $15 million was superior to that of Arcadia and the district was strapped for cash. In 1985, the district was approved to lease the site; it was rezoned for development in 1986 and was demolished beginning in 1987, with the Old Main building being razed in 1992.

An attempt was made by alumni to name the district's new high school, which would open in 1995, Scottsdale High School; the district instead opted to honor the recommendation of future parents and students to name it Desert Mountain High School. The school location is commemorated by decorative columns at the corner of Drinkwater and Indian School Road and by a plaque dedicated in 2011 on the site, which now is home to a Hilton Garden Inn hotel.

== Notable alumni ==
- Stuart Margolin, actor
- Jim Palmer, Hall of Fame baseball pitcher
- John L. Phillips, NASA astronaut
- Lisa Graham Keegan, Arizona Superintendent of Public Education
- Fee Waybill, lead singer-songwriter for The Tubes
- Dan Quayle, Vice President of the United States; attended the school for two years
