= Little Red Schoolhouse (Shaw Island, Washington) =

- U.S. National Register of Historic Places
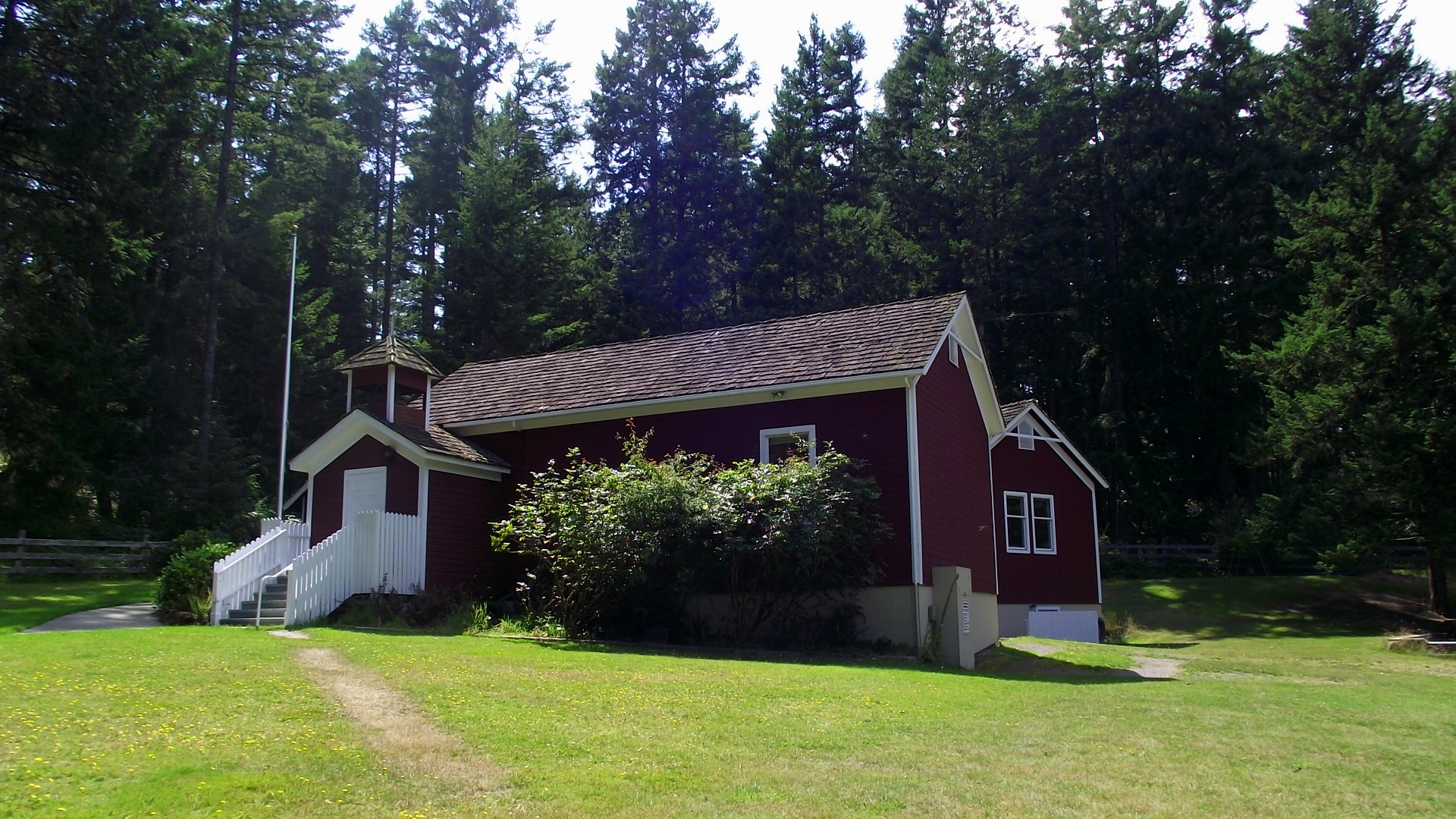
- The schoolhouse in 2011

- Location within Washington (state)
- Location: Corner of Hoffman Cove and Neck Point Cove Rd., Shaw Island, Washington
- Coordinates: 48°34′22″N 122°57′43″W
- Area: less than one acre
- NRHP reference No.: 73001886
- Added to NRHP: June 19, 1973

The Little Red Schoolhouse on Shaw Island, Washington was listed on the National Register of Historic Places in 1973.

In 1971 it was still in use as a one-room schoolhouse.

However, a room was recently added to serve as a computer center, expanding it to two rooms. The building serves elementary and middle school students. It serves students up to eighth grade.

It is located at the corner of Hoffman Cove and Neck Point Cove Rd.
