= The Little Outfit Schoolhouse =

- U.S. National Register of Historic Places
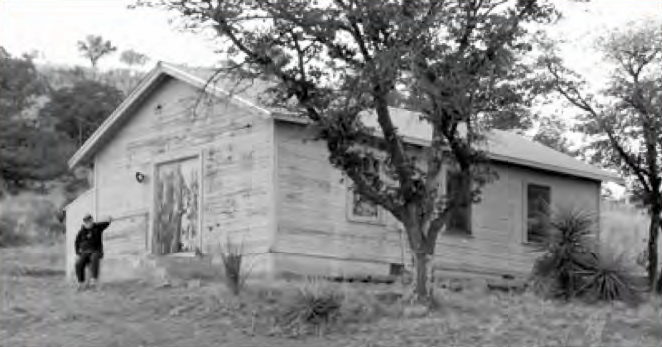
- The Little Outfit Schoolhouse, sometime before its restoration in the mid-2000s.

- Location within Arizona Location within the United States
- Nearest city: Patagonia, Arizona
- Coordinates: 31°29′42.75″N 110°34′25.12″W
- Area: less than one acre
- Built: 1940
- Architect: Hutchinson, Katharine Warfield; Dustman, Otto
- Architectural style: one-room schoolhouse
- NRHP reference No.: 08001275
- Added to NRHP: January 8, 2009

The Little Outfit Schoolhouse is a ranch school that was built in 1940 in southeastern Arizona. It is located on the Little Outfit Ranch in San Rafael Valley, about ten miles east-southeast of Patagonia, in Santa Cruz County, which borders Mexico on the south and is about 80 miles from Arizona's eastern border with New Mexico.

In the early and mid-twentieth century ranch schools became an important part of the educational system in many western states and Arizona led the nation in total number. The concept set high academic standards but also put strong emphasis on the ideals of the American Old West, rugged outdoor activities, and independence of spirit. The Little Outfit Ranch School provides an excellent example this approach to education and in 2009 the schoolhouse itself was placed on the National Register of Historic Places. The schoolhouse is managed by the Little Outfit Preservation Group, Inc.

== History ==
The land the schoolhouse is on was homesteaded by Harry Fryer in 1917 and in 1940 it was bought by Buel and Katharine Hutchinson who named it The Little Outfit Ranch. They built a one-room schoolhouse and later that same year opened The Little Outfit Ranch School. The school was coed the first two years but later was all boys, usually had 20 to 25 students and covered grades 3 to 8. Academics were strong but there was a great emphasis on the ways of the West and every student was assigned a horse.

== The surrounding territory ==
The San Rafael Valley is still very sparsely populated, the rich grasslands being used primarily as range for cattle. The nearest house even now seventy years later is still over a mile away, and in the 1940s the nearest telephone was a ten miles ride. The elevation is 5,100 feet with the mountain called Old Hutch, on the north side of the ranch, rising to nearly 6,000 feet. The entrance road to the ranch is off FR 799, Canelo Pass Road—a long, dusty, red dirt road that leads to the small town of Patagonia.

== The founders ==
The people who founded the Little Outfit Ranch School, Katharine ("Kit") and Buel Hutchinson, moved from Chicago with their three children; Ann, Mary, and Ned in 1940. Adventure was surely part of their motive for moving to such a remote area, but the move would also solve a health problem Ned had – a persistent cough that had only disappeared when he stayed several weeks on the 76 Ranch near Willcox, Arizona.

Kit Hutchinson was the boss of the ranch, the school's head mistress, and a surrogate mother to the boys. She could ride with the best of them and often organized cross country treasure hunts on horseback. She taught English to the older boys and she was quick to seize opportunities for learning like Tucson rodeos, Christmastime trips deep into Mexico, and witnessing the mustering of the last of the Army's Indian Scouts at Fort Huachuca. She wrote plays for the boys to perform on the stage behind the schoolhouse. She also made songs about life at the Little Outfit, organized graduation ceremonies, and all the while keeping parents well informed on how their boys were doing.

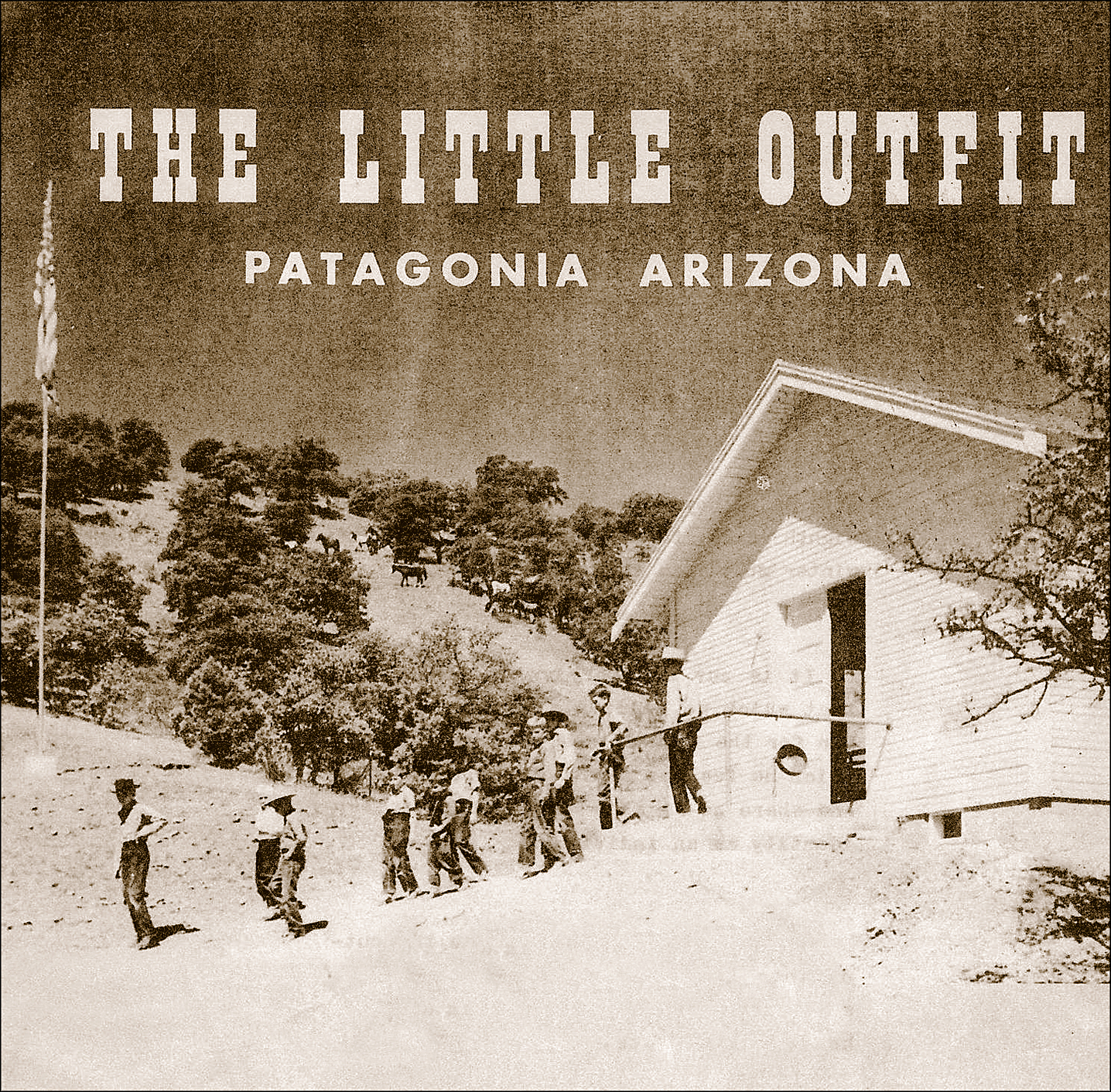
The cover of a brochure published in 1943.

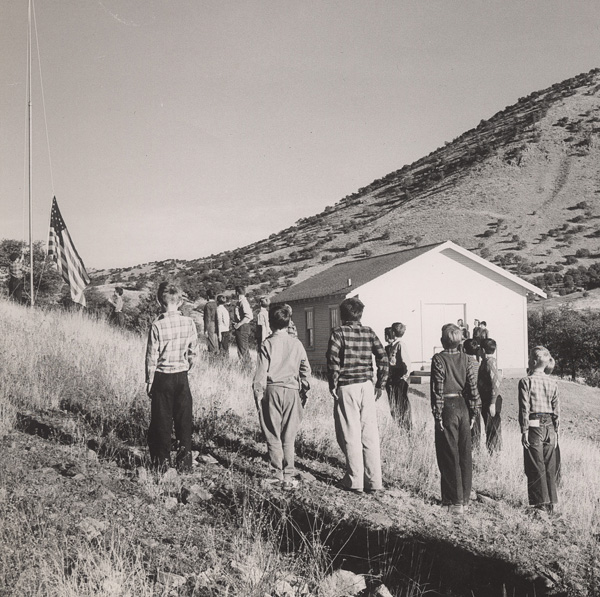
Students raising the flag.

Buel Hutchinson moved permanently to the ranch in 1942. He had been the sales manager for the Warfield Spice Company that Kit's father owned. On the ranch he maintained the various appliances and machines, the electric generation plant, the milk house supplies and so on. He was a natural with the boys and an excellent teacher – both academically and athletically (Buel held the record for the longest touchdown run in football for the University of Chicago).

== How students were recruited ==
Publicity that would attract students depended mostly on word of mouth but brochures promoting the school were also used. An article in Arizona Highways described a number of ranch schools in operation by 1940, their appeal, and their significant benefit to Arizona. The Tucson Chamber of Commerce put out a brochure touting the thirteen ranch schools surrounding Tucson including the Little Outfit School. The Chicago area produced many students thanks to the Hutchinson's having lived there before purchasing the Little Outfit Ranch. The Chicago Tribune published a full-page article on the “Schoolboy Cowboys” with many pictures featuring the local Chicago boys attending the Little Outfit School.

== The ranch school concept ==
The concept of ranch schooling had an especially high appeal for the parents of students suffering from various health conditions, primarily asthma. A better climate, many believed, might assist in the recuperation of sickly youths. The parents hoped that the clean, warm air combined with the physical activities that the ranch school offered in addition to the academic work, would aid their children's physical rejuvenation. Instructions in the ideals of the cowboys – independence, honesty, and a willingness to work hard added to the ranch school's allure. Arizona soon led the nation in the number of ranch schools.

== School closure ==
The closure of the Little Outfit School – As a small, private institution, the Little Outfit School was completely dependent on a high level of effort by its owners, the Hutchinson's. Doubtless an important consideration in their continuing was the completion of their own children's education which was accomplished in the late 1940s. The resignation of Slim Mayo – the school's wrangler—in 1947 left the school without one of its most important teachers. While formal grade school education stopped in 1950, the schoolhouse continued as an educational institution for many years thereafter, functioning as the center of an active summer camp.

Because it is a fine example of the ranch school education which was so important in Arizona in the early years of the twentieth century, The Little Outfit Schoolhouse was added to the National Register of Historic Places on January 8, 2009. The schoolhouse is managed by the Little Outfit Preservation Group, Inc.

== See also ==
- Little Red Schoolhouse (Beyerville, Arizona)
- National Register of Historic Places listings in Santa Cruz County, Arizona
