= Shaw Island =

Island in Washington, US

- Location of Shaw Island in the San Juans

- Location within Washington (state)

Geography
- Location: Pacific Northwest
- Coordinates: 48.5732°N 122.9573°W
- Archipelago: San Juan Islands
- Area: 7.7037 sq mi (19.952 km^{2})

Administration
- United States
- State: Washington
- County: San Juan County

Demographics
- Population: 240 (2010)

Shaw Island is the smallest of the four San Juan Islands served by the Washington State Ferries. The island has a land area of 19.952 square kilometers (7.704 square miles) and a small year-round population of 188 (2020 census). During the summer time, weekends swell with other residents and the occasional tourist.

== History ==
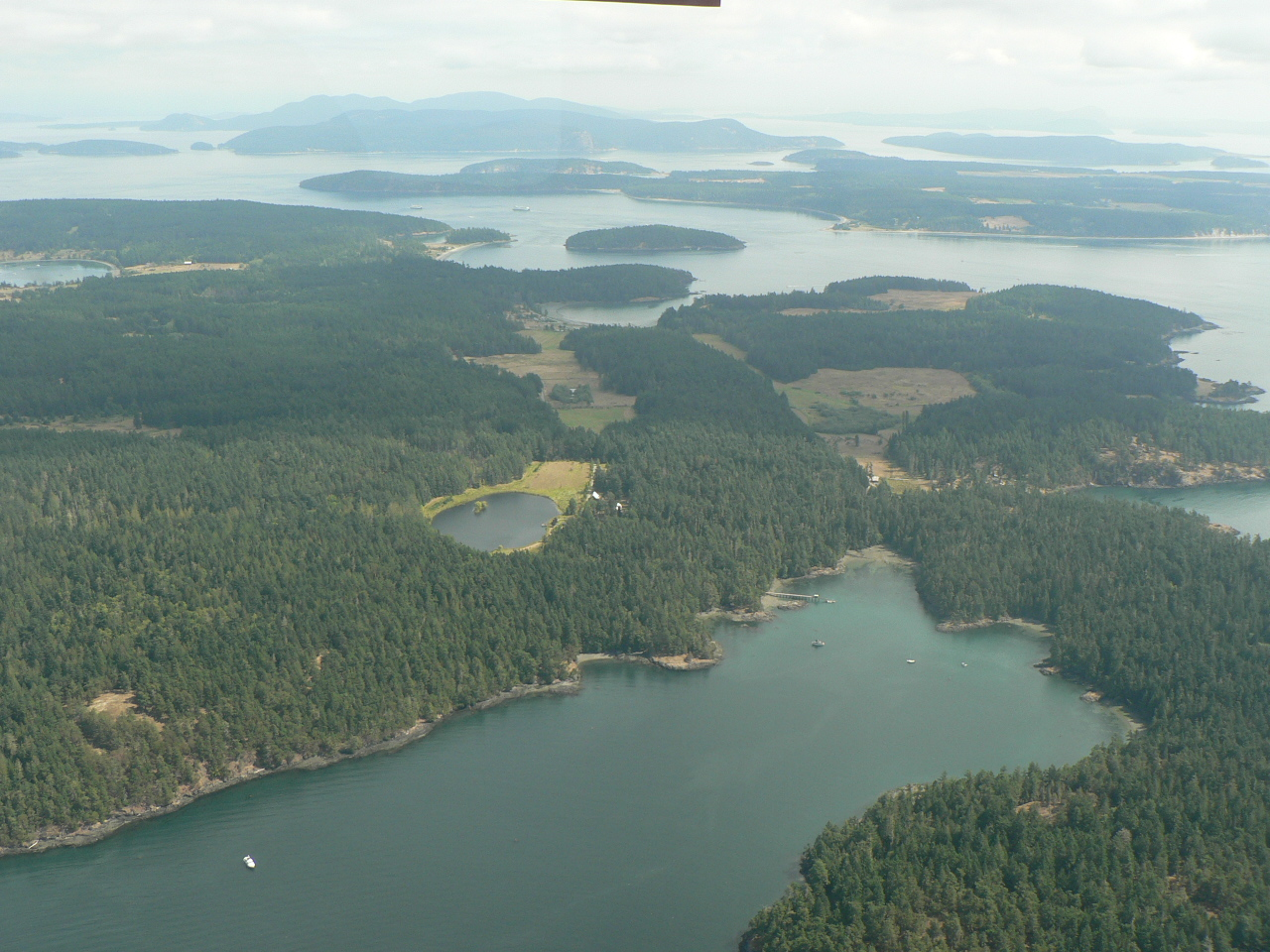
Most of the southern half of Shaw Island (looking to the east), with the much smaller Canoe Island immediately past it, then Lopez Island most prominent in the background

The island is within the historical territory of the Lummi Nation. The United States obtained Shaw Island and the rest of the San Juan archipelago by treaty in 1855, but Lummi retained certain cultural and resource rights, including fishing.

The Wilkes Expedition, in 1841, named the island after John Shaw, a United States Naval Officer. According to Bill Tsilixw James, hereditary chief of the Lummi Nation, the Lummi know the island as Sq'emenen. A San Juan Island resident proposed to the state Board of Geographic Names in 2015 that Squaw Bay be renamed Sq'emenen Bay; that proposal generated a compromise proposal from the Shaw Island Historical Society to rename the bay Reef Net Bay, in recognition of the reef net fishing historically and currently done there. The name "Reef Net Bay" was adopted.

=== History of nuns ===
There have been three Catholic religious institutes of nuns on Shaw Island. Benedictine nuns established a monastery on 150 acres (61 hectares) in the 1970s; while the Sisters of Mercy have owned an unofficial retreat on the island since the 1980s. Nuns of the Franciscan Sisters of the Eucharist ran the island's only store and the ferry terminal for almost 3 decades, until 2004, when they relocated elsewhere.

== Island infrastructure and amenities ==
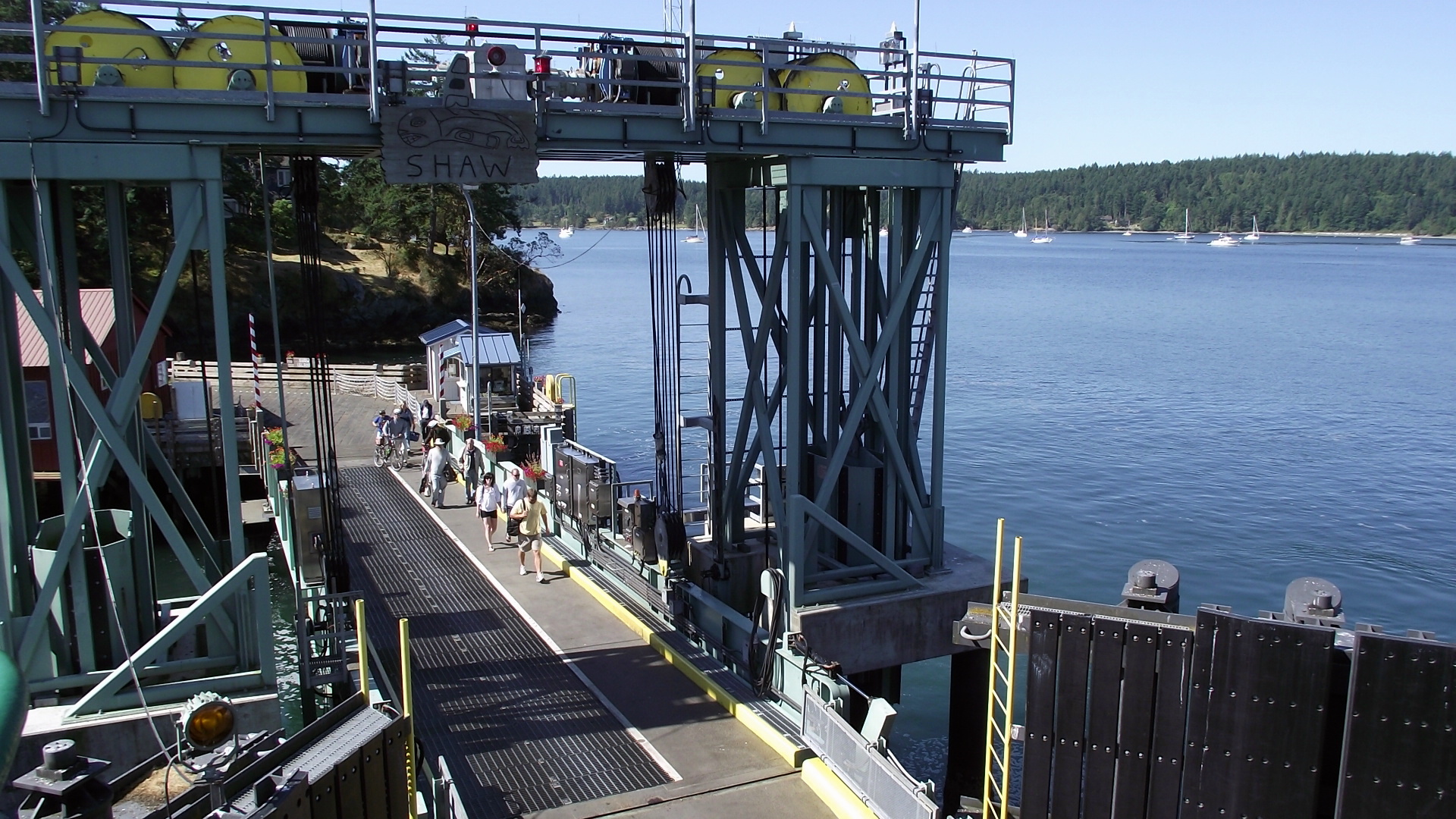
The ferry dock at Blind Bay. Terminal has a native Orca petroglyph carving sign.

Shaw Island has a county park, a historic general store open all year, and a post office at the ferry landing. A member-supported library and historical museum are located near the middle of the island.

The University of Washington also owns property throughout the island, notably the Cedar Rock Preserve on the south side of the island, a gift from Robert H. Ellis, Jr. The stated vision for these properties is "to maintain and restore native biodiversity and ecosystem function and to facilitate education and research that is consistent with these goals" and "to maintain important parts of the cultural landscape."

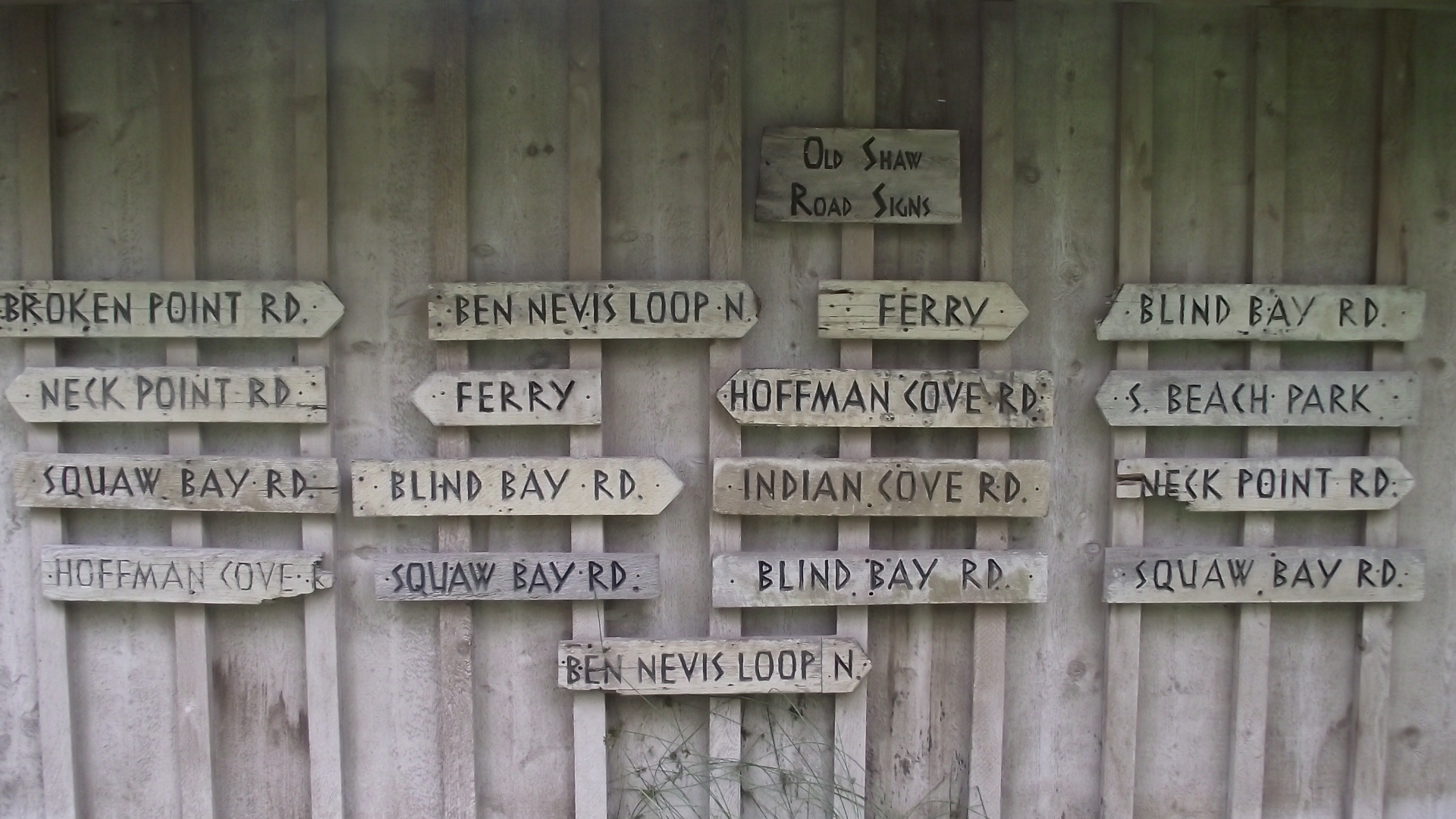
The trademark road signs

Shoreline access is best at the Shaw Island County Park, due to its vast beachline. There are 11.5 miles (18.5 km) of asphalt and 2.37 miles (3.81 km) of gravel public roads on Shaw. The primary roads are three loops in the interior of the island, with branches to the ferry dock, Shaw Island County Park, Neck Point, and part-way to the private property of Broken Point.

== Arts and culture ==
=== Historical structures ===
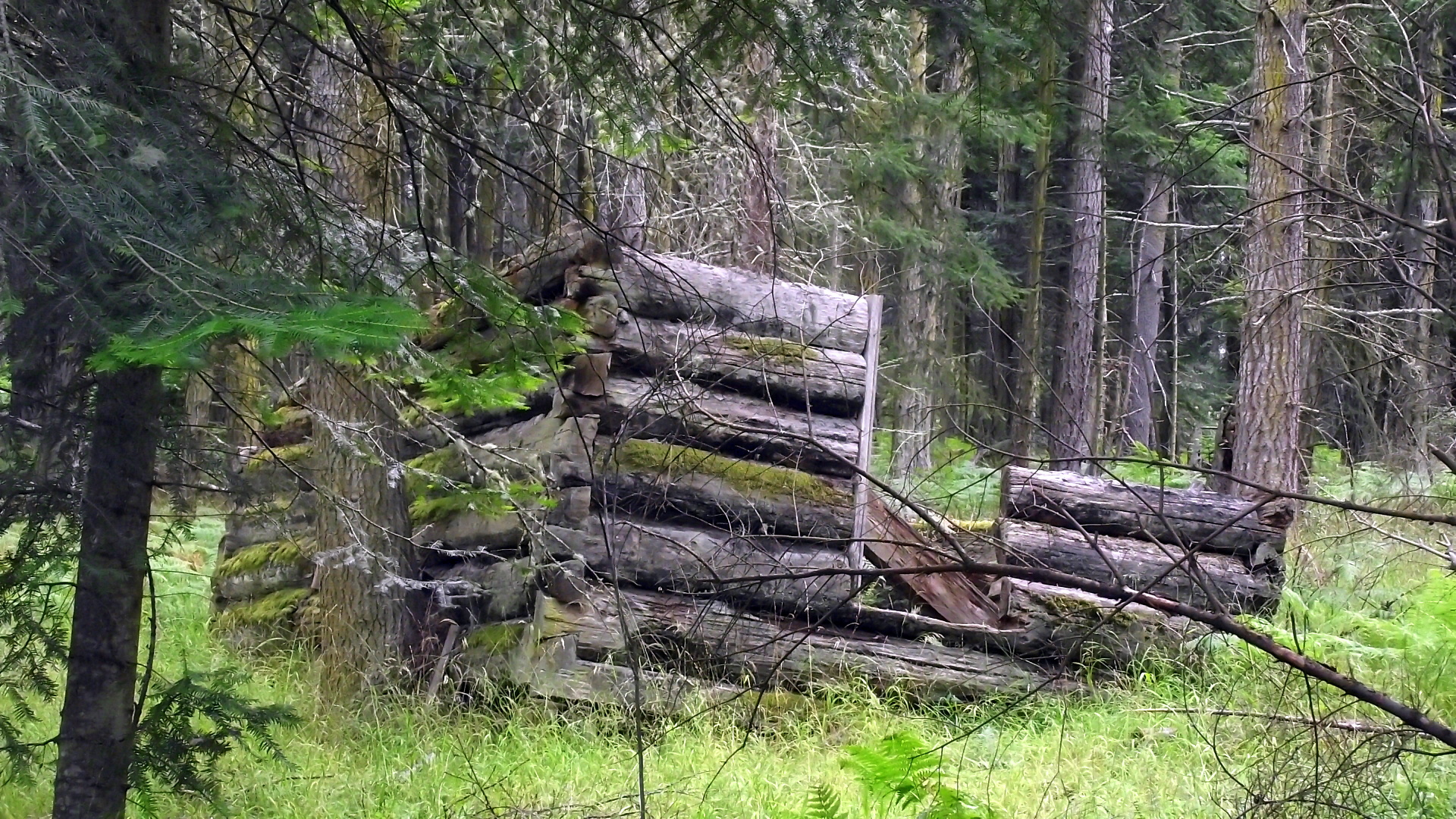
The first Shaw school located on Reef Net Point adjacent Shaw Island County Park

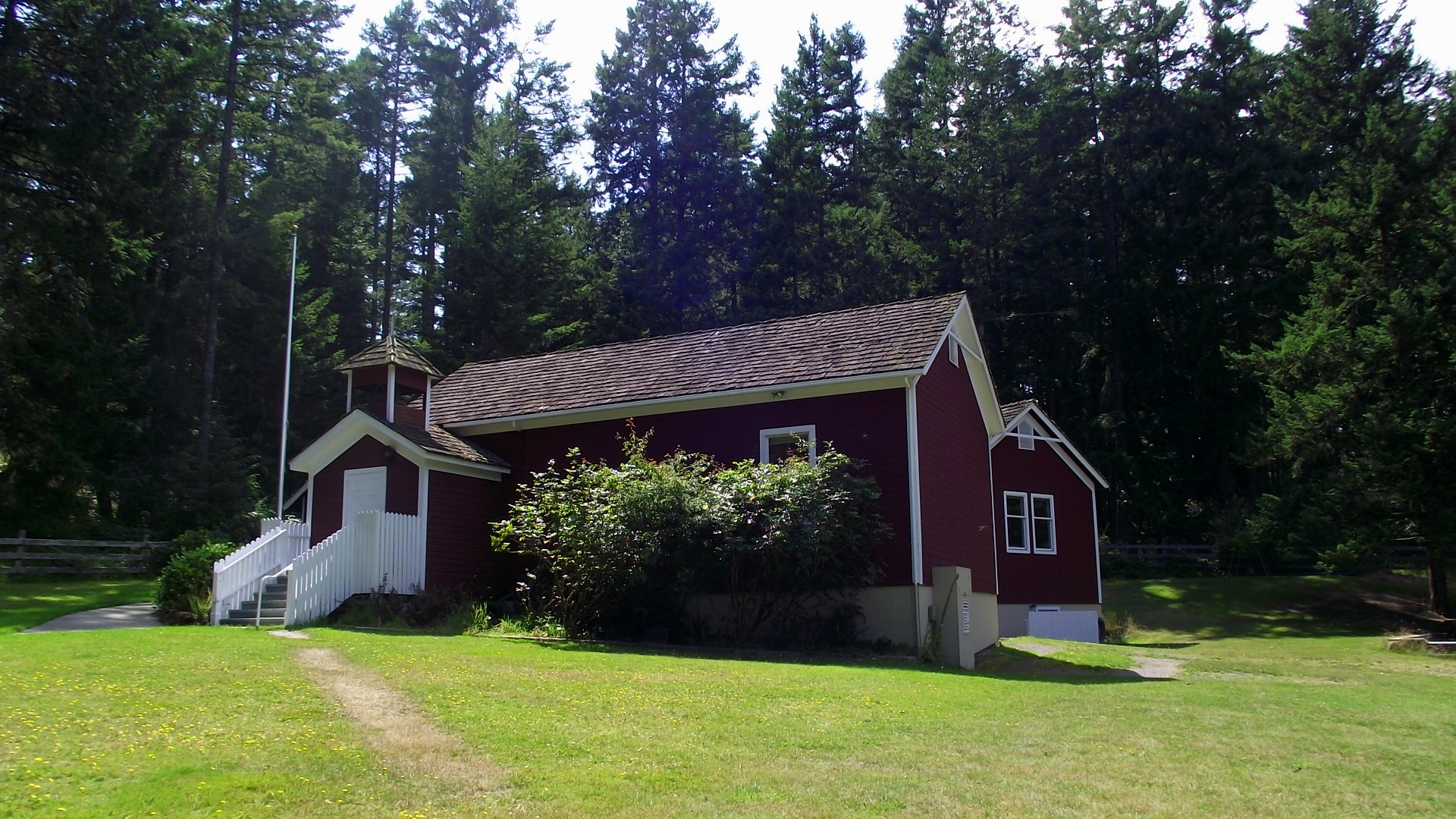
Historic "little red schoolhouse"

Shaw Island School District #10, has an operational historic one-room school (although a second room was later added), with classes for kindergarten through eighth grade students. Known as the Little Red Schoolhouse, it has been in continuous use since it was built in 1891 and is the longest-running school in the State of Washington. The building is listed on the U.S. National Register of Historic Places.

Shaw Island also has a small membership funded library and historical museum.

=== Popular culture ===
Shaw Island was featured during the fifth-season episode "Access" of the political drama The West Wing as the site of a standoff between terrorist suspects and the US government, similar to the Waco, Texas Branch Davidian standoff. Shaw Island was mentioned in the movie Glory.

Cartoonist Zach Stroum drew an online comic strip named "Shaw Island" from 2000 to 2006, before retiring his online presence. The strip featured characters living on and around the island, including a hamster society that was often used to parody popular video games and anime series of the time.

=== Tourism ===
Businesses pertaining to tourism are required to maintain the character of the island as a small-scale, rural, and agricultural community through the Shaw Subarea Plan of Washington State's Growth Management Act. These include commercial recreational facilities; transient accommodations by themselves or in combination with any commercial use, food service facilities, and transient moorage and dry storage facilities.
