= Joe Sorren =

American painter

Joe Sorren (born 1970 in Chicago) grew up in Arizona and began painting in 1991. Two years later he earned a BFA from Northern Arizona University. His artwork has appeared in various publications, including The New Yorker, Time and Rolling Stone. Warner Bros. and Atlantic Records have also used his art.

His first solo exhibit was in 1995, and had his first retrospective in 2010. A mural of his adorns an outdoor wall at Heritage Square in Flagstaff, Arizona. The 40 feet (12 m) by 30 feet (9 m) painting took 9 months to complete.
