= Little Red Schoolhouse (Scottsdale, Arizona) =

- U.S. National Register of Historic Places
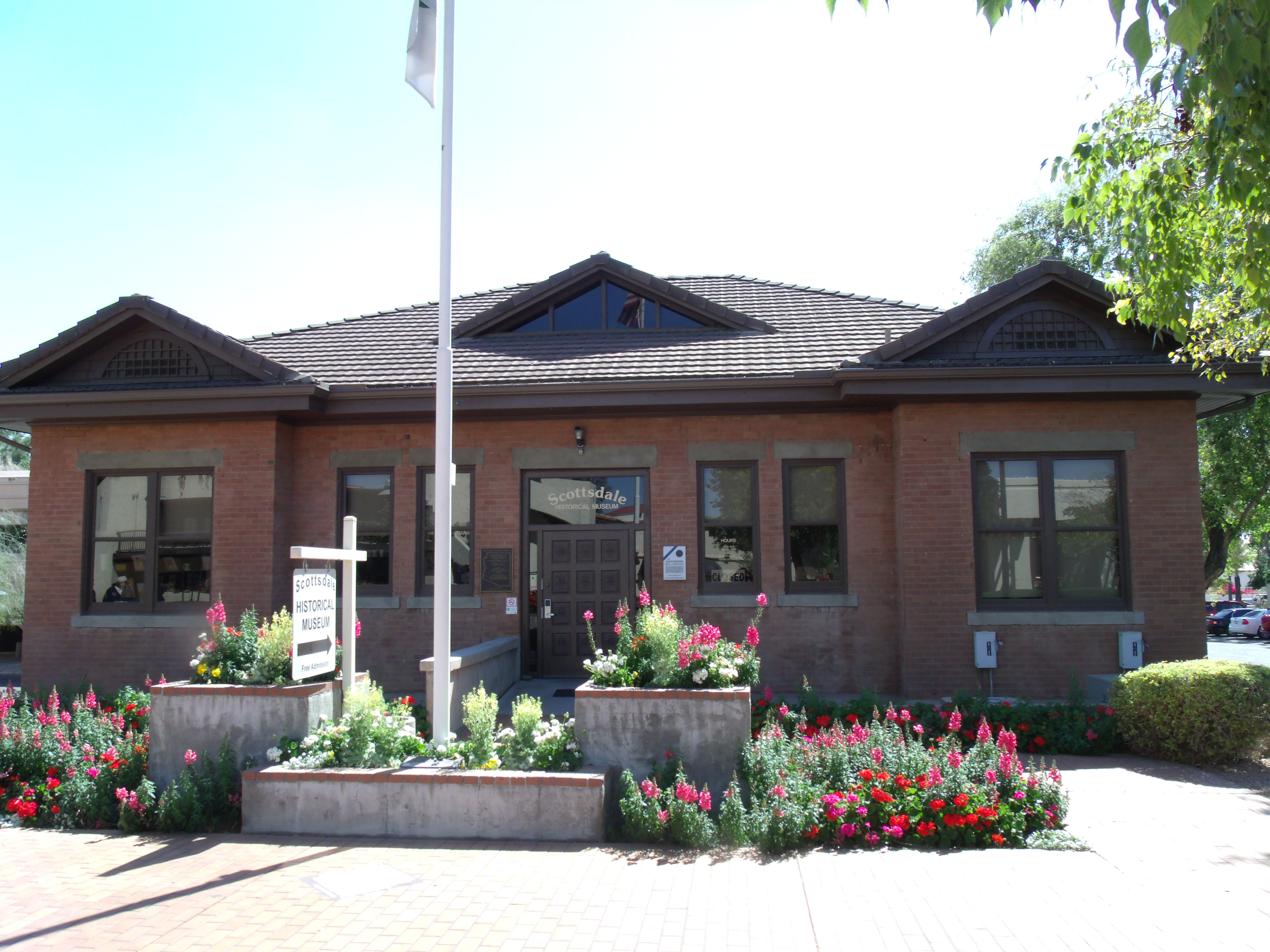
- The Little Red Schoolhouse in 2012.

- Location within Arizona Location within the United States
- Location: 7333 E. Scottsdale Mall, Scottsdale, Arizona, US
- Coordinates: 33°29′34″N 111°55′25″W
- Built: 1909
- NRHP reference No.: 94000571
- Added to NRHP: June 10, 1994

The Little Red Schoolhouse is a former school building located in Scottsdale, Arizona. It was originally known as the Scottsdale Grammar School and is now home to the Scottsdale Historical Museum.

The Little Red Schoolhouse was built in 1909 for the Scottsdale Unified School District to replace an earlier one-room frame schoolhouse that was built in 1896. The new schoolhouse is a two-classroom structure built of red brick at a cost of $4,500. In addition to the two large classrooms, there is an entrance hall, two small rooms for storage, and a full-sized basement that was used as a church and a community center in the early years. The schoolhouse was later used as the Scottsdale City Hall and Justice Court, the Scottsdale Public Library and then the Scottsdale Chamber of Commerce.

The Scottsdale Historical Society was established in 1969 to save the Little Red Schoolhouse from being demolished for the development of the Scottsdale Mall. Over the next several years, the school was restored to its original condition and now includes a classroom exhibit meant to appear as it did in 1910. In November 1991, the Scottsdale Historical Society opened the building to the public as a local history museum and in 1994 it was added to the National Register of Historic Places.

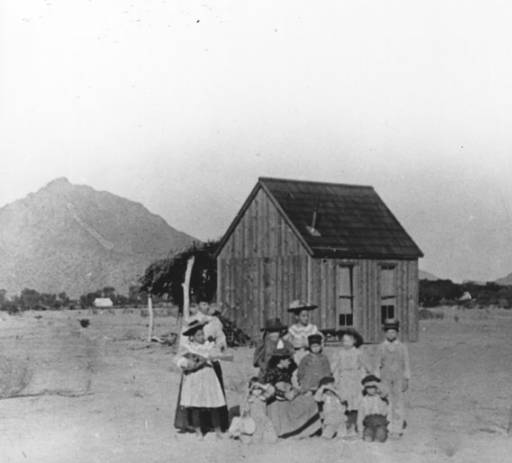
The original frame schoolhouse built in 1896.

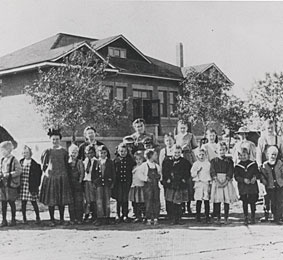
Students and teachers in front of the Little Red Schoolhouse, c. 1910.

== See also ==
- Little Red Schoolhouse (Beyerville, Arizona)
- National Register of Historic Places listings in Maricopa County, Arizona
