= Ranch school =

Type of school in the Western U.S.

A ranch school is a type of school used in rural areas of the Western United States.

== History ==
The ranch school movement began in the Western United States in the early 1900s as a way to educate children who lived on ranches in remote and rural areas, far away from regular schools in the towns and cities. The idea was popular and within a short time many ranch schools took on characteristics of a boarding school and a dude ranch, where Easterners or city-dwellers could send their children as well.

At the time, Americans widely believed that the arid climate of the Western states could help children recuperate from conditions like asthma. The hard work that went with living and working on a ranch and spending a lot of time outdoors was also appealing to those who wanted their children to grow up strong, healthy and independent. Most ranch school students rode a horse every day and were taught the basics of ranching and living outdoors, in addition to regular school teachings.

Arizona led the nation in the number of ranch schools, most of which were in the Tucson area. Many were for boys only, but there were some all-girls schools as well, such as the Hacienda del Sol school outside of Tucson or the Jokake School in Scottsdale. Most of the ranch schools were built for locals, but some ranchers — such as those at the Little Outfit Ranch in Arizona's San Rafael Valley — established ranches with the specific intention of operating them as boarding schools for "city boys".

Ranch schools were advertised in magazines and newspapers, drawing in students and their families from across the country, and as a result are credited with contributing to the growth of the tourism industry in the Southwest in the early 1900s. By the 1960s, most of the ranch schools in the United States were closed or soon-to-be closed, marking the end of the traditional ranch school movement. However, some ranch schools have survived, such as Deep Springs College.

Many contemporary ranch schools are therapeutic boarding schools for "troubled teens".

== Gallery ==
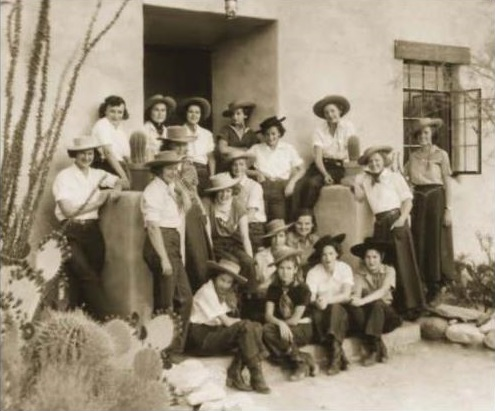
Students at the Hacienda del Sol ranch school in the 1930s

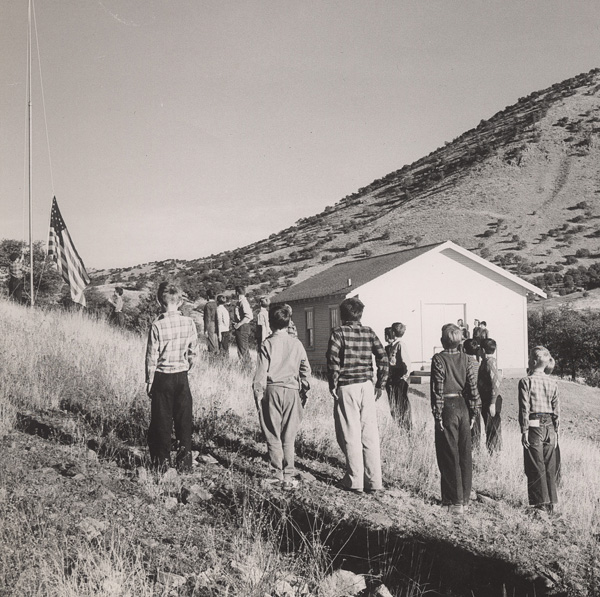
Students of the Little Outfit Schoolhouse raising the US flag in 1943

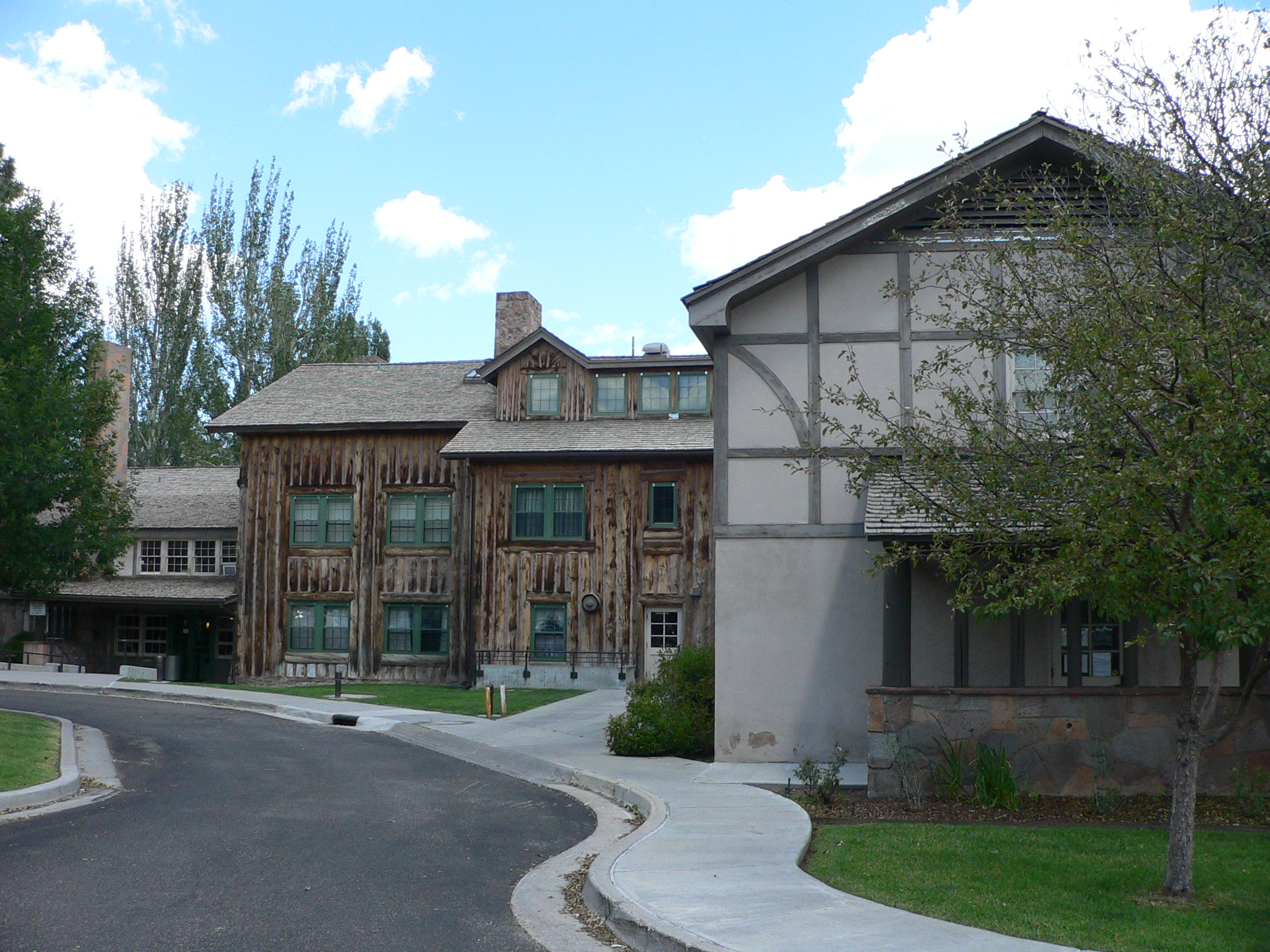
Fuller Lodge was the main building at the Los Alamos Ranch School in New Mexico.

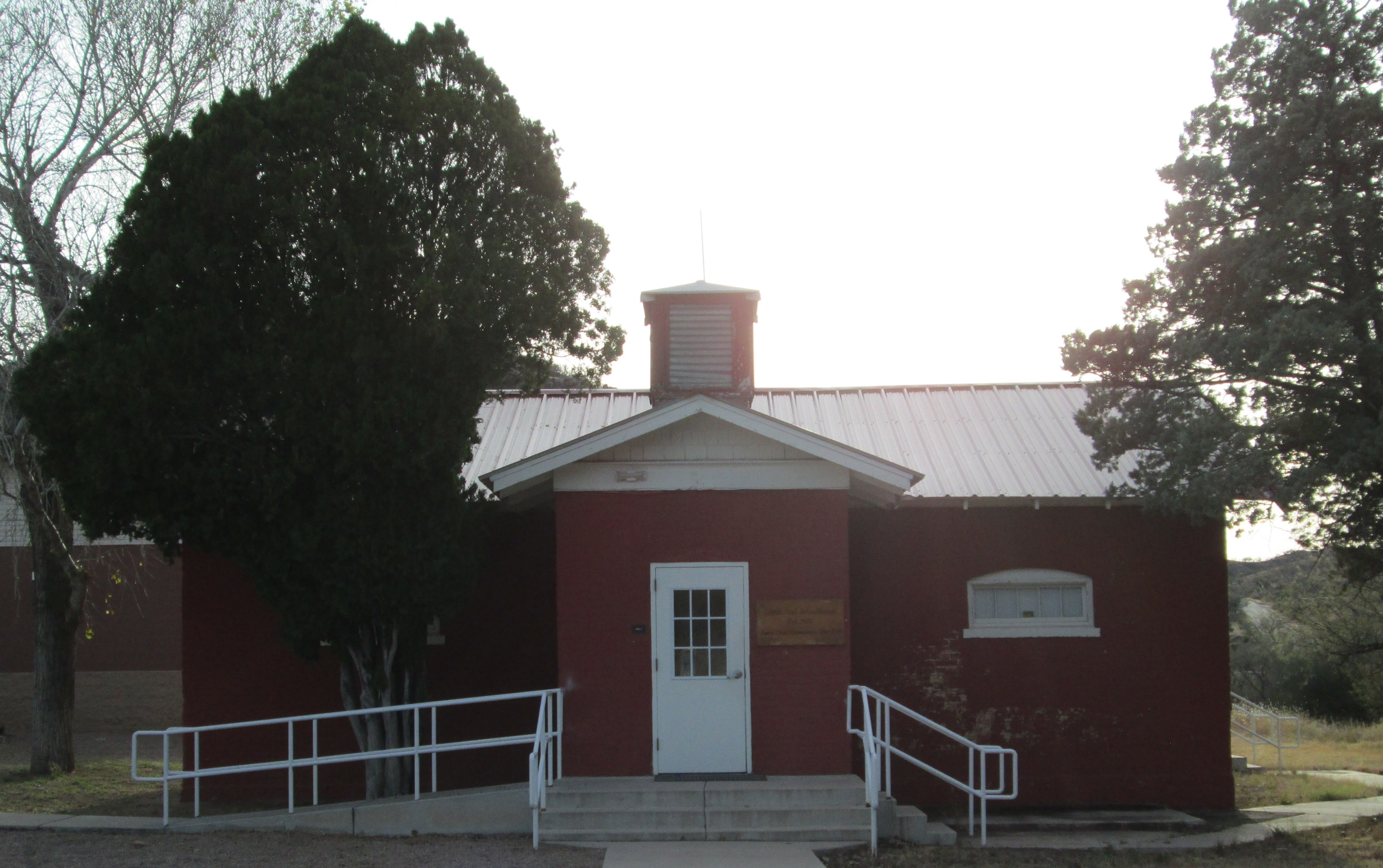
The Little Red Schoolhouse in what is now Beyerville, Arizona, was built in 1921 for the children of local ranchers and farmers.

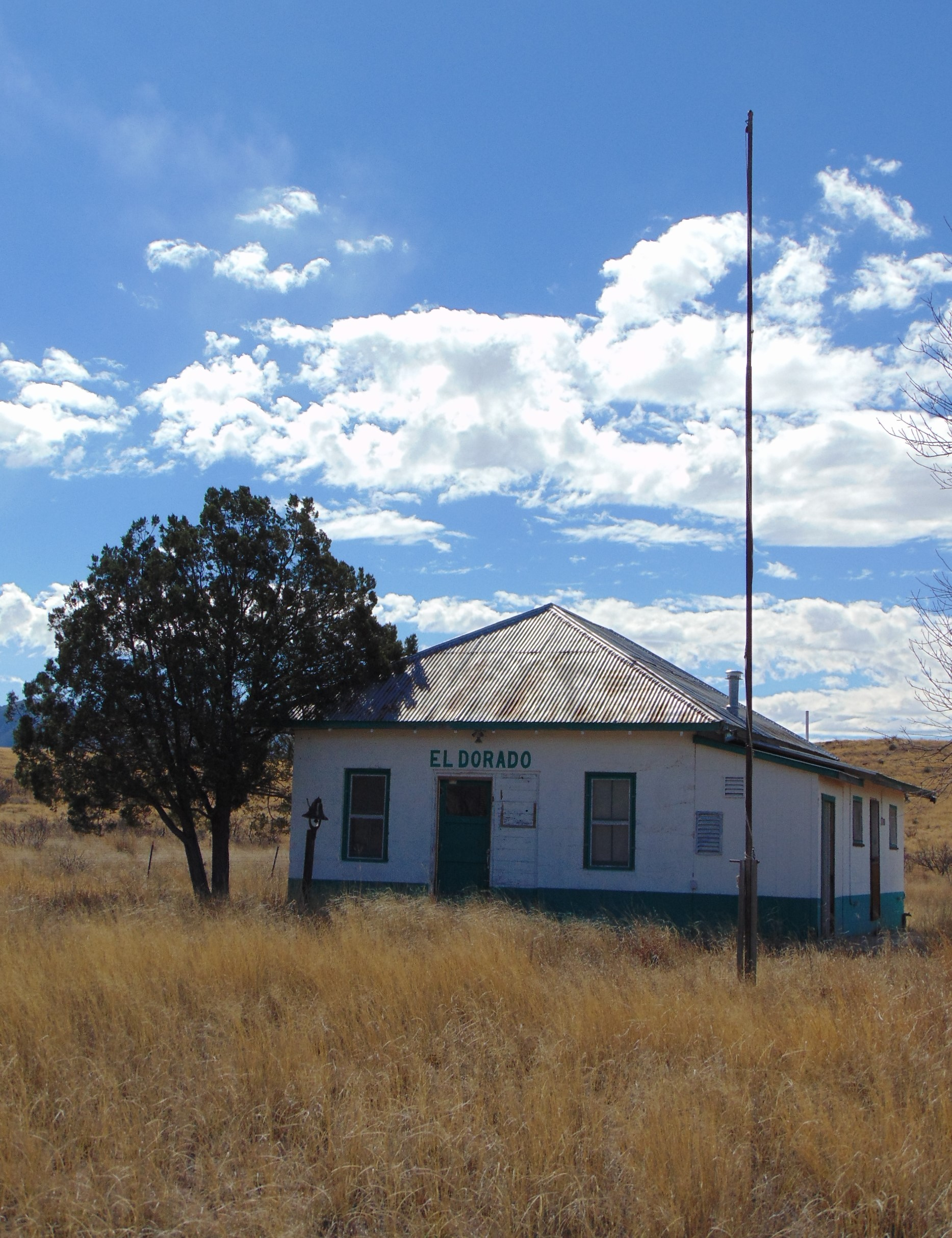
The El Dorado Schoolhouse in eastern Sulphur Springs Valley, Arizona, near the Faraway Ranch Historic District

== See also ==
- One-room school
- Open-air school
- American Indian boarding schools
- Mace-Kingsley Ranch School
