= Regency Mall =

Regency Mall may refer to:

- Regency Mall (Augusta, Georgia)
- Regency Mall (Richmond, Virginia)
- Pritchard Park Mall, formerly Regency Mall, in Racine, Wisconsin

== See also ==
- Regency Square Mall (disambiguation)
