= Hull Property Group =

US shopping mall management company

- Type: Private
- Industry: Retail, real estate
- Founded: 1977
- Headquarters: Augusta, Georgia, United States
- Area served: Southern & Midwestern United States

Hull Property Group is a shopping mall management company based in Augusta, Georgia. It was founded in 1977. The company owns, manages, and re-develops shopping malls in relatively small communities, mainly in the south and mid-west United States.

== History ==
The company was founded in 1977 as Hull Properties, renamed Hull/Storey in 1993, and became Hull Storey Gibson in 2008.

Among its acquisitions are Regency Square Mall in Florence, Alabama, in 2002, and Victoria Mall in Victoria, Texas in 2003.

In 2007, Hull Storey offered eleven of its properties for sale. These malls were located in Alabama, Georgia, North Carolina, South Carolina, and Tennessee. The malls were to have been sold to Hendon Properties, but the deal failed in early 2008.

Hull Storey Gibson also bought Macon Mall of Macon, Georgia in 2010 and began renovations on it. Danville Mall, formerly Piedmont Mall, was bought in 2013.

In September 2014, the company was restructured with the mall retail arm being renamed Hull Property Group.

In January 2017, Hull Property Group purchased the Hudson Valley Mall in the upper Hudson Valley region of New York state.

In January 2020, Hull Property Group purchased The Mall at Whitney Field, in Leominster, Massachusetts.

In May 2021, Hull Property Group announced that it will purchase the Charleston Town Center Mall in Charleston, West Virginia.

On October 27, 2025, Hull Property Group announced that it had acquired the Dayton Mall in suburban Dayton, Ohio, out of Washington Prime Group's Chapter 11 bankruptcy receivership.

== List of properties ==
Mall properties managed by Hull Property Group include:

- Alton Square Mall Alton, Illinois
- Asheboro Mall, Asheboro, North Carolina
- Auburn Mall, Auburn, Alabama
- Blue Ridge Mall, Hendersonville, North Carolina
- Carolina Mall, Concord, North Carolina
- Charleston Town Center, Charleston West Virginia
- Citrus Park Town Center, Citrus Park, Florida
- Cleveland Mall, Shelby, North Carolina
- Columbia Mall, Columbia, Tennessee
- Danville Mall, Danville, Virginia
- Dayton Mall, Dayton, Ohio
- Decatur Mall, Decatur, Alabama
- Eastgate Mall, Cincinnati, Ohio
- Fairgrounds Square Mall, Reading, Pennsylvania
- Florence Mall, Florence, Alabama
- Fort Henry Mall, Kingsport, Tennessee
- Greenwood Mall, Greenwood, South Carolina
- Hudson Valley Mall, Kingston, New York
- LaGrange Mall, LaGrange, Georgia
- Leigh Mall, Columbus, Mississippi
- Lake City Mall, Lake City, Florida
- Macon Mall, Macon, Georgia
- Milledgeville Mall, Milledgeville, Georgia
- Mount Berry Mall, Rome, Georgia
- New Bern Mall, New Bern, North Carolina
- Prince of Orange Mall, Orangeburg, South Carolina
- Quintard Mall, Oxford, Alabama
- Regency Mall, Racine, Wisconsin
- Richmond Mall, Richmond, Indiana
- Statesboro Mall, Statesboro, Georgia
- Sumter Mall, Sumter, South Carolina
- The Mall at Whitney Field, Leominster, Massachusetts
- Victoria Mall, Victoria, Texas
- Walnut Square Mall, Dalton, Georgia
- Wilson Mall, Wilson, North Carolina — a former shopping mall, opened in 1964 as Parkwood Shopping Center and was enclosed in 1979 as Parkwood Mall. The mall closed on January 7, 2013, with remaining tenants operating separately until the site was acquired by the City of Wilson and demolished in 2026.
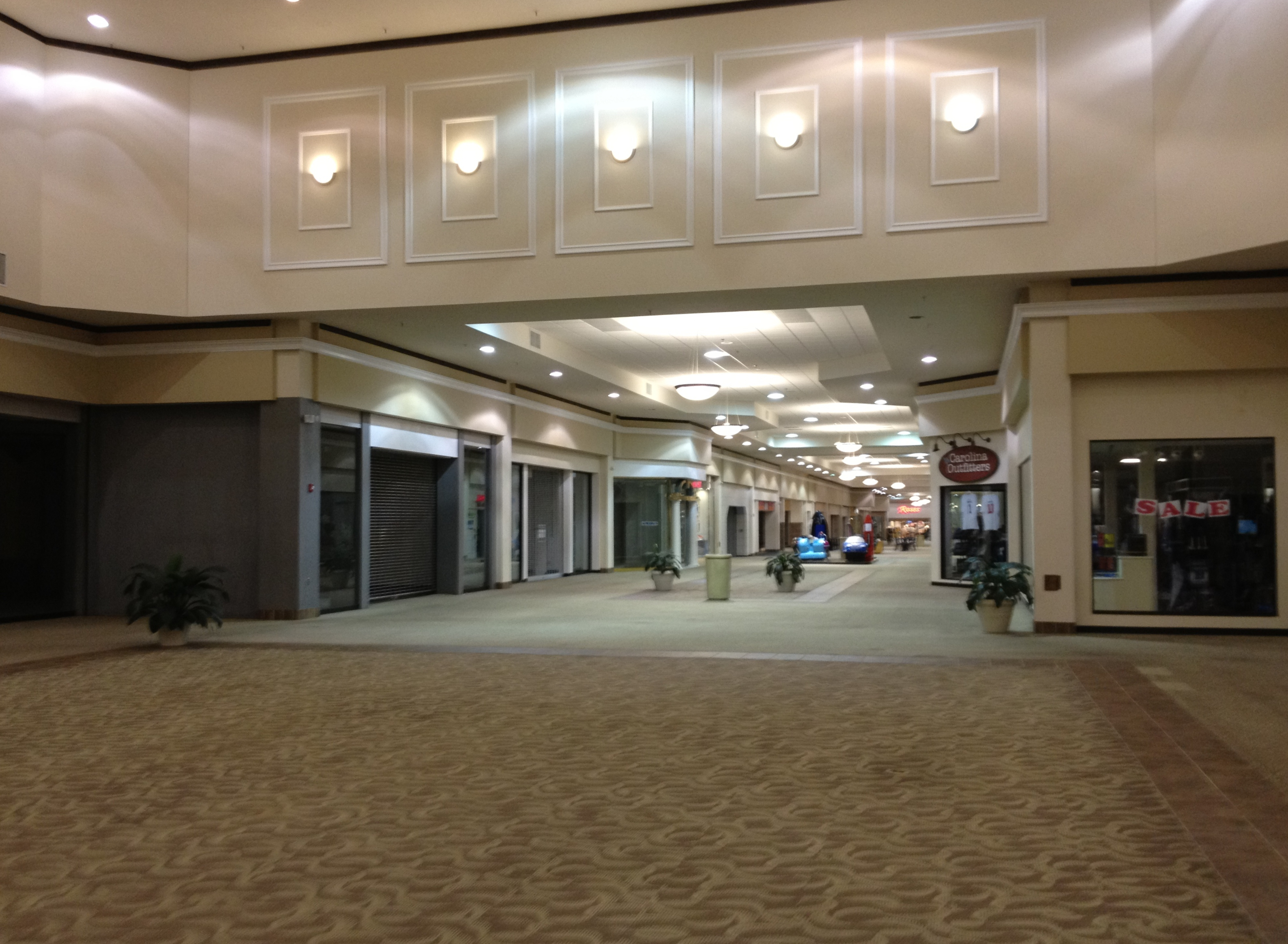
  Wilson Mall in August 2012
