= Fort Henry Mall =

- Location: Kingsport, Tennessee, United States
- Coordinates: 36.52912°N 82.52048°W
- Opened: 1976
- Developer: Arlen Realty
- Manager: Tonya Jackson
- Owner: Hull Property Group
- Num. of stores: 15 stores
- Num. of anchor tenants: 4 (3 open, 1 demolished)
- Floor area: 529,814 square feet (49,221 m^{2}) (GLA)
- Floors: 2 (1 in Dunham's Sports, Rural King, and former Sears)
- Website: www.forthenrymall.com

Fort Henry Mall, formerly Kingsport Town Center, located in Kingsport, Tennessee, is the only regional shopping mall serving Kingsport. It was opened March 10, 1976, as a two-level mall located at the intersection of Fort Henry Drive and Memorial Boulevard. It is owned by Hull Property Group. The mall has three anchor stores: Belk, Dunham's Sports and Rural King.

Over 65 stores have been located in the mall. Many of the national mall chains have been operating here, as well as some local stores. There is no central food court in the mall, so the eating establishments are spread out throughout the mall.

== History ==
Fort Henry Mall opened in 1976 as Kingsport's second enclosed shopping mall. Kingsport Mall located 2 miles away was home to department stores Montgomery Ward and Hill's along with several smaller stores, restaurants, and a movie theater. This mall was later closed and converted into the outdoor strip mall, East Stone Commons. Fort Henry Mall's original retail anchors included Sears, JCPenney, Miller's Department Store, and Belk.

=== Failed renovation plans and loss of tenants ===
Starting in 2010, the mall had planned a series of renovations on both the interior and exterior. The interior renovations were expected first, followed by the exterior. Also a name change took place (in mid-2008, for mall advertisements and doors). The renovations include: new stone-paved floors; gathering places with comfortable seating; a new children's play area; a fresh, contemporary design with brick and glass façades; a new clock tower; a food court; and monumental new entry structures. There were also two plans for expansion, one to JCPenney (which was to be demolished, with a new prototype building built separate from the mall. The anchor building would have been connected to the mall with a new promenade-style area with a courtyard and shops lined down a sidewalk. The plans later changed to expand the current building and renovate. The cinema side was to be expanded out to the end of Sears. That expansion would have included a two-story atrium with two escalators leading to the second floor. A food court would be on the right (currently Belk Home and Kids), and a dining terrace would be atop the expansion. The cinema would have expanded from an 11-screen to a 14-screen center. There would have also been 4–5 outparcels built in the parking lot, which were slated to be mostly restaurants. Interior work was to begin in 2010, which would have included the new children's play area. All work should have been completed by 2011 but continued to be pushed back. The mall received approval for city tax incentives targeting new tenants that may move into the mall. Signs went up all over the mall, telling everyone that big changes are on the way and also promoting the new name. The slogan used on the signs is, "You have to believe it to see it". Starting in late June, the mall started using its new name in the local newspapers and Funfest brochures. But the name change wasn't supposed to happen until after the building work was almost finished. If the expansion project had been completed it would have taken the mall from its current size of 530,000 square feet (49,000 m^{2}) to 634,000 square feet (58,900 m^{2}), which included the outparcels. The total cost for all of the renovations and construction has been projected between $30 and $40 million at the time of announcement.

As of early 2010, the mall had yet to see much work. By this time, the original plans would have been well underway. But due to the mall management group, General Growth Properties, selling out their spot to The Hocker Group, the mall's plans were altered to expand and renovate. In November 2009, the mall received all new lighting in the hallways and courts throughout the mall. Then in late December 2009, Chick-fil-A, Radio Shack, and Waldenbooks all announced they would be closing for various reasons. Both Chick-fil-A and Radio Shack closed after Christmas and Walden Books closed in January.

In July 2010, Dollar Tree also closed and moved to another location in Kingsport. The Belk Home and Kids store recently combined with the Belk Men and Women's store on the other side of the mall. The main Belk store was renovated, customer service was removed, and other space-saving measures took place to make room for the home and kids store to move in. The area that once housed the Belk Home and Kids store, Sugar Momma, and GNC were intended to become a food court with the planned renovations but the area only remained empty following these stores' relocations.

In August 2011, Marquee Cinemas announced they would not be renewing the tenant lease and that they would depart the mall to build a separate complex in June 2012. This would leave the mall without a movie theatre. Little to no work has been done on the mall, and tenants continue to leave for other sites in Kingsport or just pull out of the market completely. By December 2011, the mall had gained The Children's Place as a major new store but also lost a cookie outlet and local shoe store.

By 2012, the previously announced plans for renovation were scrapped except for the theater, which Frank Theatres took over operations of. They announced plans to build a 12 screen cineplex entertainment center including an IMAX theater, bowling alley, laser tag, bumper cars, and restaurant in the theater space and an addition to be built. Work was supposed to have begun in Summer 2012 be completed by Spring 2013, but failed to ever break ground.

=== New ownership ===
In 2016, Hull Property Group purchased the mall from Avision Young and soon after received a 20-year tax break from the City of Kingsport to begin renovations on the property. By this point, the mall had lost major retailers Aéropostale, Kirkland's, Shoe Dept, Charley's Grilled Subs, Justice, Deb, Hallmark Cards, MasterCuts, and Christopher & Banks

On January 4, 2017, Sears announced that they would be closing this location at the end of March. The name of the mall return to Fort Henry Mall in efforts to connect back with the community.

Mall owners Hull Property Group entered into a lawsuit with Frank Theatres in December 2016 over unpaid rent stemming from contract issues regarding the original renovations of the theater following Marquee's exit. Frank failed to follow through with their plans to build an entertainment center on the property and but blamed the city for not following through with their end of an incentive deal. Frank in return stopped paying rent in March 2016 and was given an eviction notice in October of the same year. a court settlement, Frank Theatres exited the mall in April 2017 leaving all equipment behind (as part of the court settlement). NCG Cinemas soon came in with a massive remodel of the theater and reopened in July 2017.

Mall renovations finally got underway at the mall in mid-2017. One of the renovations was the addition of Dunham's Sports in the former Belk Home Store.

On June 4, 2020, it was announced that JCPenney would be closing around October 2020 as part of a plan to close 154 stores nationwide. After JCPenney closed, Belk and Dunham's Sports became the only remaining anchor stores left.

In January 2023, it was announced American Eagle would be closing in the Fort Henry Mall.

A new anchor tenant, Rural King, opened in the mall in May, 2025 in the former JCPenney. The store takes up the remaining vacant anchor space that has not been demolished.

As of May 2026, more stores have left the mall, including LensCrafters, Bath and Body Works, and Kay Jewelers. Per the mall's own website, only 14 tenants are left (with one being a temporary location for the Kingsport Public Library).
