= Greenwood Mall =

Greenwood Mall may refer to:

- Greenwood Mall (Kentucky), in Bowling Green, Kentucky
- Greenwood Mall (South Carolina), formerly Crosscreek Mall, in Greenwood, South Carolina

== See also ==
- Greenwood Park Mall, in Greenwood, Indiana
