= Searstown =

Searstown is the name of several shopping centers, derived from the name of the department store chain Sears. It may refer to:

- The Mall at Whitney Field, formerly Searstown Mall, in Leominster, Massachusetts
- Searstown Mall, a defunct shopping mall in Titusville, Florida
- Searstown Shopping Center, a strip mall in Fort Lauderdale, Florida
- Searstown Plaza, a strip mall in Key West, Florida
- Harbor Square, formerly known as Searstown and Shore Mall, in Egg Harbor Township, New Jersey
