= Dalton Mall =

Shopping mall

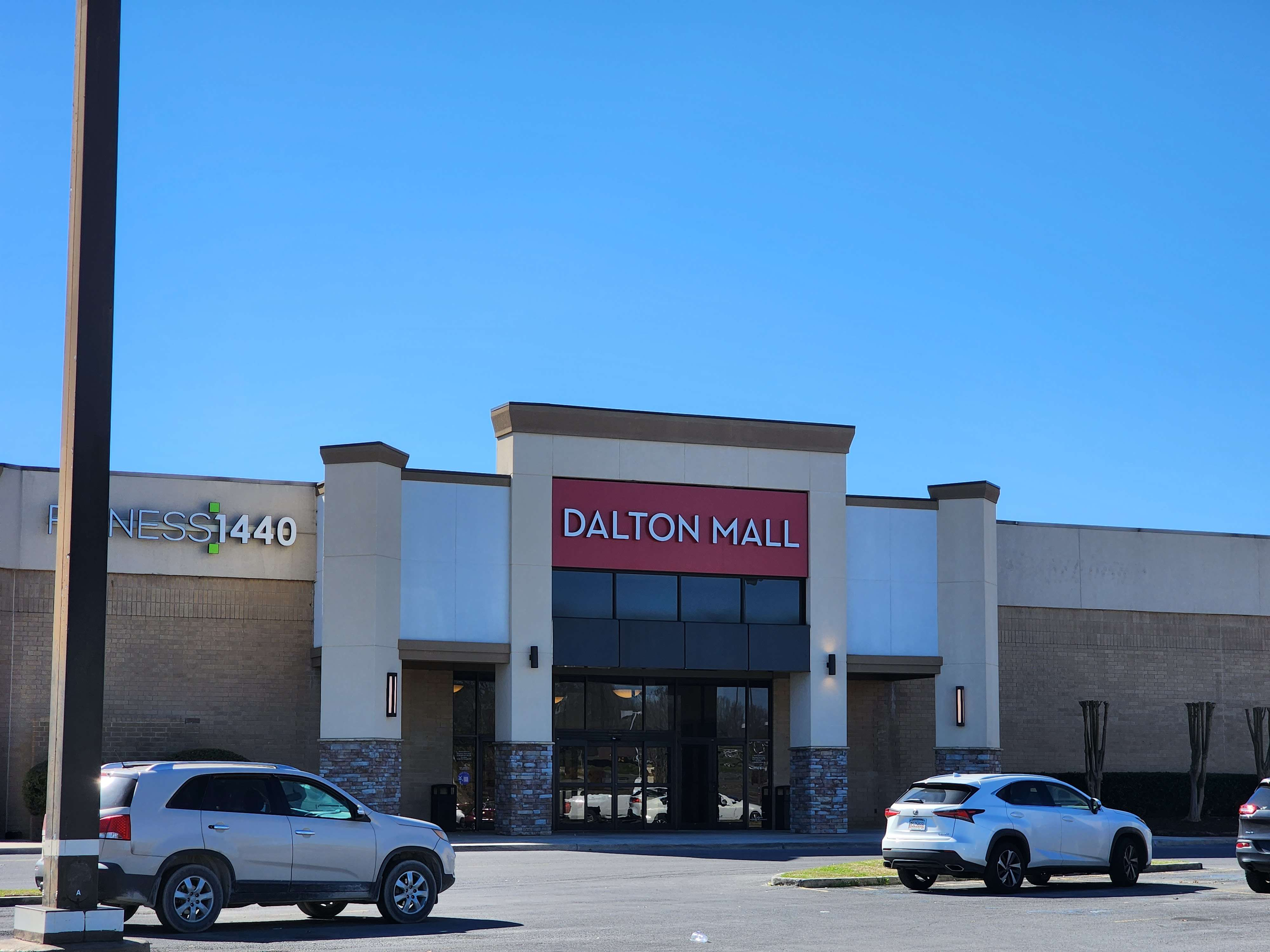
- Main entrance of Dalton Mall in 2023
- Location: Dalton, Georgia, U.S.
- Coordinates: 34.75883°N 84.93336°W
- Address: 816 Walnut Square Blvd
- Opened: July 23, 1980
- Developer: CBL & Associates Properties, Inc
- Manager: Hull Property Group
- Owner: Hull Property Group
- Num. of stores: 25
- Num. of anchor tenants: 3 (2 open, 1 vacant)
- Floor area: 449,239 square feet (41,735.7 m^{2})
- Floors: 1
- Parking: 2,535 spaces
- Website: daltonmall.com

Dalton Mall, formerly known as Walnut Square Mall is an indoor shopping center located in Dalton, Georgia. It was developed by CBL Properties.

== History ==
=== Construction and grand opening ===
Originally named Walnut Square Mall, the indoor shopping center was designed and built by CBL Properties. Located on the former "Patterson Horse Racing Arena", CBL and Associates conducted a groundbreaking ceremony on the property in 1979 to construct Dalton's first enclosed shopping center. The mall opened with the anchors Sears and Belk, with Loveman's (a Chattanooga-based department store) opening later on August 20, 1980. During the five day period July 23 -27 1980, CBL celebrated their grand opening of the mall with guest appearances from Steve Gipson and Fubar the Robot.

=== Tenants ===
In addition to senior anchors Sears and Belk, property managers signed Revco and Martin Triple Theater as junior anchors. Loveman's (a Chattanooga-based department store) joined the list of senior anchors on August 20, 1980. The opening of another senior anchor, JCPenney was delayed until spring 1982, due to an existing lease at Bryman's Plaza. Their footprint at Walnut Square Mall, when they moved to that location was 68,000 ft^{2} (6,300 m^{2}). It is said that CBL intended on bringing Miller's Department Store as the mall's fifth and final anchor, but it fell through. For the next 10 years, Chick-Fil-A and Peanut Shack would straddle a bare blank wall.

In 1990, Walnut Square Mall underwent a renovation which included a new facade, tile flooring in the courts, and a new color scheme. Many inline stores also underwent renovations at that time. In an effort to promote the new renovations, in November 1990 the mall celebrated a 10-year anniversary grand re-opening. This coincided with the construction of the Goody's Family Clothing pad. In 1992, Goody's opened in the long vacant space between Chick-Fil-A and Peanut Shack. Goody's remained as an anchor until 2009 when the company filed for bankruptcy, which resulted in the closing of many of its stores. In 2010, The Rush Fitness Complex leased and renovated the former Goody's pad. In 2014, Rush Fitness was acquired by Gold's Gym. Gold's closed in 2019. Fitness 1440 took over the space in early 2020.

Martin Triple Theater was operated by the Leon Hurst family throughout its tenure at the mall. In 1993, Carmike Cinemas closed the Plaza Five Theater across the street (also managed by Dale Hurst, the son of Leon Hurst), and expanded the former Martin Triple into a nine-screen complex with the latest up-to-date technology. Carmike Cinemas 9 would become Georgia's largest inline cinema at the time. Dale Hurst and his family conducted many promotions for new movies that are still memorable today.

=== Decline ===
Dale Hurst was promoted to corporate in 2007, and Carmike Cinemas 9 closed following the opening of the new Carmike 12 behind the mall. The inline cinema space was converted to mall storage, and eventually fell into a dilapidated state. Other tenants suffered a similar fate. In 2015, JCPenney closed their location at the mall. RadioShack and Deb soon followed, declaring bankruptcy and closing.

Loveman's was acquired by Proffitt's in 1986, and Belk acquired Proffitt's in 2008, using that store as their Home and Children department. In 2015, Belk shuttered the former Loveman's location.

In 2017, Sears announced closures which included its location at Walnut Square. Only the auto center remained open. Sears closed the auto center in November 2017 and moved all equipment to their Hamilton Place Mall location in Chattanooga, Tennessee. Jo-Ann Crafts (a junior anchor) also shuttered, leaving the Sears end nearly vacant. In 2019, a new discount store named Gimme-A-Five leased the former Loveman's location.

=== New owner, rebranding and renovation ===
In 2016, CBL and Associates sold the mall property to Hull Property Group (Georgia-based company).

Hull rebranded the shopping center, changing the name to Dalton Mall. The mall underwent extensive renovations, including updating the facades, changing the paint scheme, laying carpet flooring throughout and covering vacant storefronts with murals that depict the local heritage. In 2018, over 240,000 ft^{2} (22,000 m^{2}) of mall building was demolished which included demolishing JCPenney, Carmike Cinemas 9 and the Sears wing. Today the mall is anchored by Belk, Fitness 1440 and Gimme-A-Five. Current out parcels include AMC 12 and shuttered Ryan's Buffet as well as Logan's Roadhouse. Shoe Dept Encore serves as a junior anchor. As of 2020 stores that have opened with the mall in 1980 and remain today are Belk, Zales, Time Out by Pac-Man, Great American Cookies, GNC, Claire's and Chick-Fil-A. As of September of 2020, it was announced that a chain called "The Juicy Seafood" will be leasing the long vacant Ryan's Buffet building and will soon be taking tenancy but a date of opening has yet to be announced.
