= Florence Mall =

Florence Mall may refer to:

- Florence Mall (Alabama), formerly Regency Square Mall, in Florence, Alabama
- Florence Mall (Kentucky), in Florence, Kentucky
- Florence Mall, a former mall in Florence, South Carolina
