= Prince of Orange Mall =

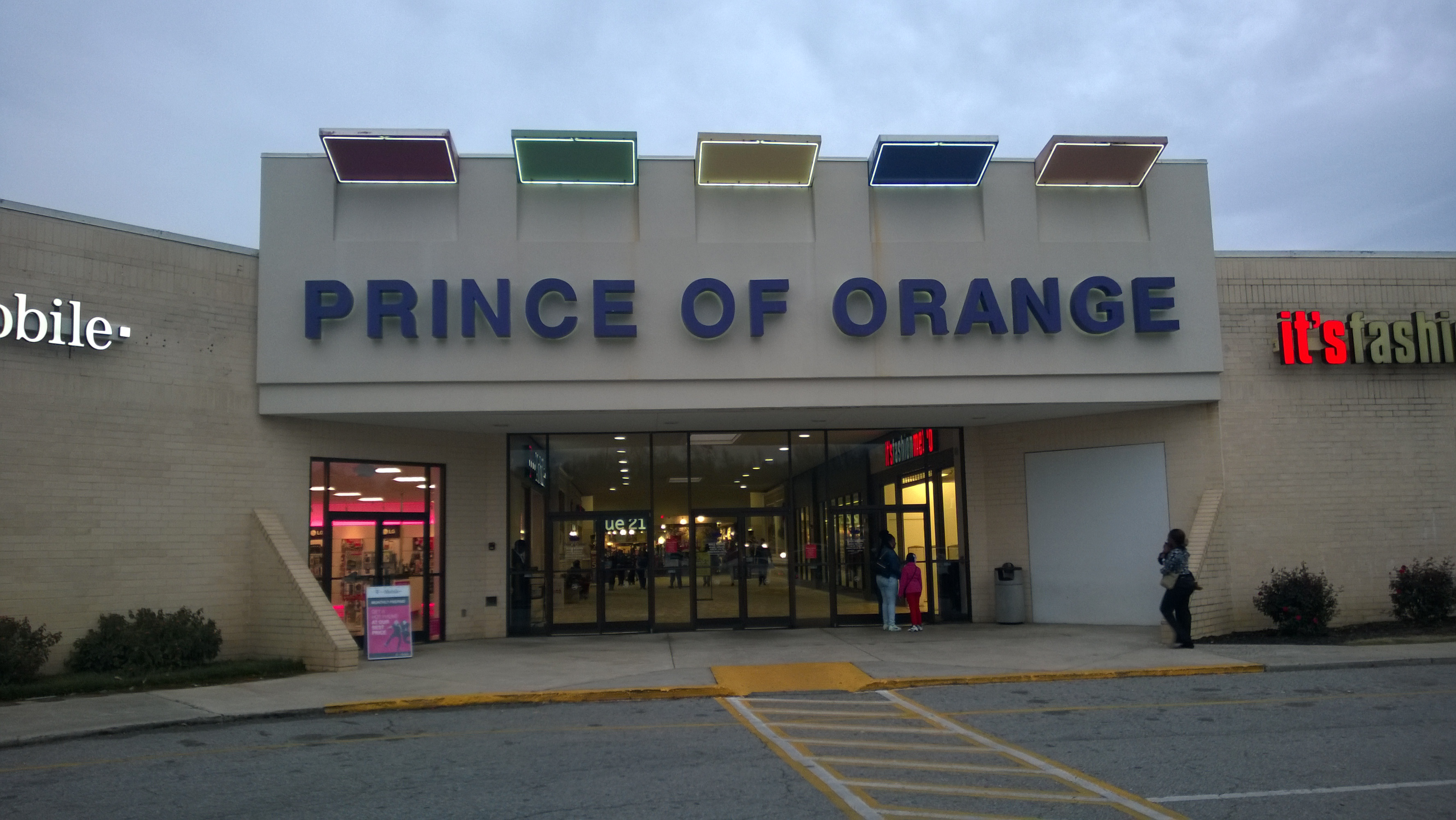
- Location: Orangeburg, South Carolina, United States
- Coordinates: 33.5229°N 80.8808°W
- Address: 2390 Chestnut Street NE
- Opened: August 15, 1984
- Developer: Orangeburg Associates
- Owner: Hull Property Group
- Architect: Pegram Associates and Riddle & Pegram
- Num. of stores: 29 (including outparcel stores)
- Num. of anchor tenants: 4 (1 open, 2 vacant, 1 demolished)
- Floor area: 334,000 sq ft (31,000 m^{2})
- Floors: 1
- Website: princeoforangemall.com

Prince of Orange Mall is a regional enclosed shopping mall in Orangeburg, South Carolina, in the United States. It is located on the northern end of town, at the edge of the city limits. It is anchored by Belk. The JCPenney anchor store closed in 2020, while the Sears anchor closed in 2013. The fourth anchor, Key Catalog Showroom, was demolished in 2015.

== Background ==
The mall was built in 1984 by Orangeburg Associates. They sold it to National Property Analysts in 1986.

It currently has approximately 336,000 square feet (31,200 m^{2}) in retail space, 270,000 square feet (25,000 m^{2}) of which is occupied by the anchor tenants. It is the only enclosed mall in the greater Orangeburg area, approximately 50 miles (80 km) south of the larger metropolitan center of Columbia and 75 miles (121 km) northwest of Charleston.

Hull Storey Gibson Companies, a regional owner of shopping malls, purchased the mall in 1998 when it was in foreclosure. At that point, the food court had no tenants and the mall was only at 70 percent occupancy. The mall was subsequently renovated and occupancy increased.

The mall is named after William IV, Prince of Orange, for which the town is also named.

On June 4, 2020, JCPenney announced that it would close around October 2020 as part of a plan to close 154 stores nationwide. After JCPenney closed, Belk is the only remaining anchor store left.
