= Auburn Mall (Alabama) =

Shopping mall

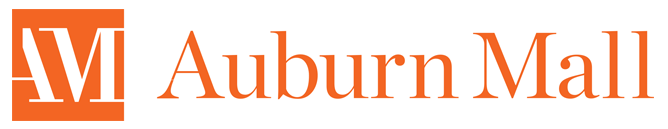
- Location: Auburn, Alabama
- Coordinates: 32.627°N 85.447°W
- Address: 1627 Opelika Road; Auburn, AL 36830
- Opened: 1973
- Developer: Colonial Properties Trust
- Manager: Hull Property Group
- Owner: Hull Property Group
- Num. of stores: 50+
- Num. of anchor tenants: 4 (3 open, 1 demolished)
- Floor area: 527,000 sq ft (49,000 m^{2})
- Floors: 1
- Website: shopauburnalabama.com

Auburn Mall is a regional shopping mall located in Auburn, Alabama, United States, and combines traditional mall shopping with village streetscape shopping. The mall has a gross leasable area of 527,000 square feet (49,000 m^{2}). The three main department stores, Belk, Dillard's, and B. Turner’s Clothing Company, are supplemented by more than 50 specialty stores. These stores include Ann Taylor Loft, JoS. A. Bank, Talbots, Chico's, and Hibbett Sports.

== History ==
Original branding

Auburn Mall was originally built in 1973 by Colonial Properties Trust as "Village Mall", with two anchor stores initially: Sears at the western end and Gayfers at the eastern end. Later the mall was expanded to include a third anchor and subsequently a fourth. In 1998, the mall's name changed to Colonial Mall Auburn-Opelika. In 2004, Auburn Mall underwent a major renovation and expansion. The expansion included new JCPenney and Dillard's buildings, Belk relocating to the market, and adding a streetscape to the front of the mall. The streetscape included retailers such as Ann Taylor Loft, Chico's, Coldwater Creek, Jos. A Bank, Lane Bryant and Talbots. The expansion also added 250+ jobs to the market. During the renovation Colonial made the decision to update the mall's name to Colonial University Village.

Since that time, Colonial University Village, along with five other Colonial properties, was purchased as part of a joint venture by Marelda Retail Development, LLC. In 2007, Jones Lang LaSalle became management and leasing contractor of Colonial University Village and the other properties. In 2014, the name of the mall was changed from Village Mall to Auburn Mall. Sears closed the store in December 2012. Stein Mart announced to take over the former Sears space in March 2017. On March 17, 2017, JCPenney announced that it would be closing as part of a plan to close 138 stores nationwide. The store closed its doors on July 31, 2017. On April 14, 2020, it was announced that the former JCPenney would be converted into a mall entrance and smaller stores. On August 12, 2020, it was announced that Stein Mart would be closing all stores.

In 2021, a department store known as B. Turner’s Clothing Company opened inside the former Stein Mart. The former Stein Mart space had been redeveloped into space for multiple retailers. B. Turner’s Clothing Company was the first store to open in the redeveloped space.
