= Carolina Mall =

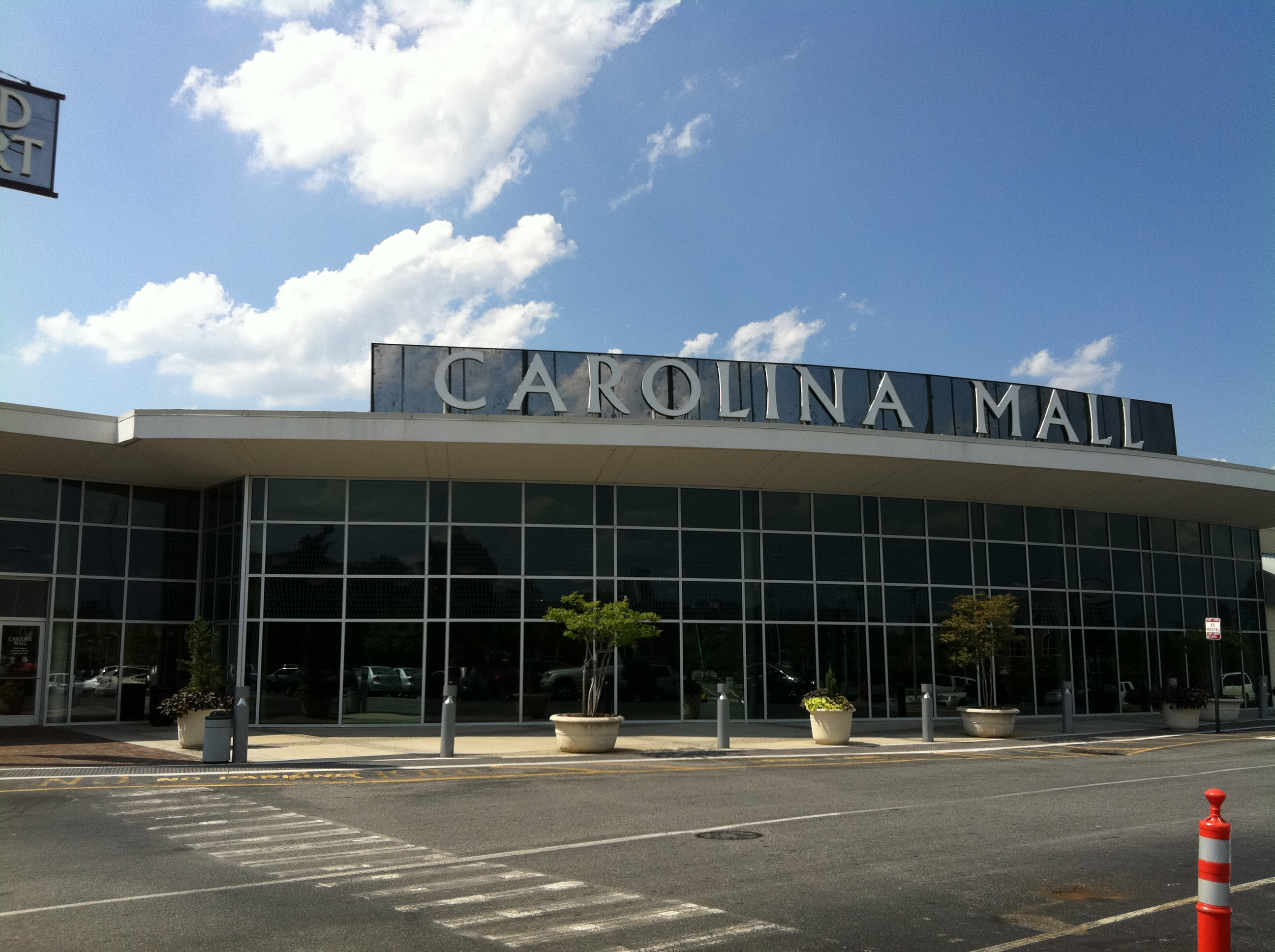
- Carolina Mall entrance, June 2011
- Location: Concord, North Carolina
- Coordinates: 35°26′25″N 80°36′13″W
- Address: 1480 North Concord Parkway
- Opened: September 21, 1972
- Developer: North Hills, Inc.
- Manager: Hull Property Group
- Owner: Hull Property Group
- Num. of stores: 50
- Num. of anchor tenants: 4 (3 open, 1 vacant)
- Floor area: 550,000 sq ft (51,000 m^{2})
- Floors: 1 (2 in former Sears)

Carolina Mall is an enclosed shopping mall in Concord, North Carolina. It is one of two shopping malls in the city, the other being Concord Mills. Opened in 1972, Carolina Mall is owned and managed by Hull Property Group. The anchor stores are Staples, Belk, and JCPenney. There is 1 vacant anchor store that was once Sears.

== History ==
Construction began in 1968. The mall opened on September 21, 1972 with about 25 stores, including a Sears. It was built by North Hills, Inc. J. C. Penney was added in 1987. The addition of this store resulted in the closure of J. C. Penney stores in downtown Concord and in nearby Kannapolis.

In 1998, several new stores opened, including American Eagle Outfitters, LensCrafters, a new Staples store, a new Sears store, and a food court. These additions were part of a mall-wide renovation that also included the renovation of the Belk store and the expansion of J. C. Penney.

A year later, Concord Mills opened. A 2004 article stated that this mall, which is more than twice the size of Carolina Mall, did not "overshadow" it due to Concord Mills featuring entertainment-oriented and outlet stores instead of traditional mall stores. In April 2002, Carolina Mall was sold to Hull Property Group.

On November 8, 2020, it was announced that Sears would be closing as part of a plan to close 7 stores nationwide. The store closed on January 24, 2021.
