= New Bern Mall =

Coordinates: 35.10374°N 77.08937°W

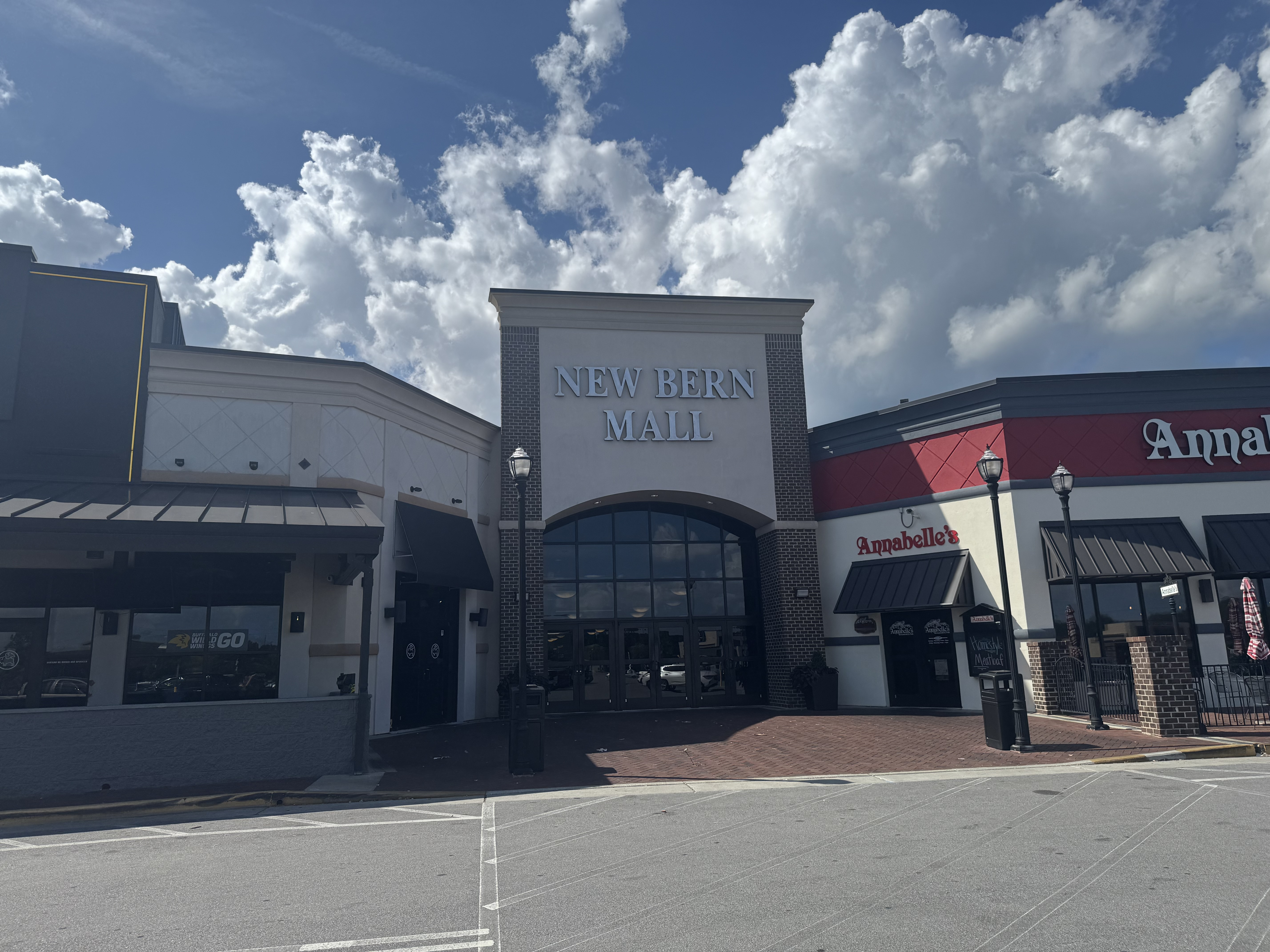
- Front entrance of New Bern Mall
- Location: New Bern, North Carolina
- Opened: 1979
- Developer: Cadillac Fairview
- Owner: Hull Property Group
- Num. of stores: 30
- Num. of anchor tenants: 5 (3 open, 1 vacant, 1 demolished)
- Floor area: 361,000 square feet (33,500 m^{2})
- Floors: 1

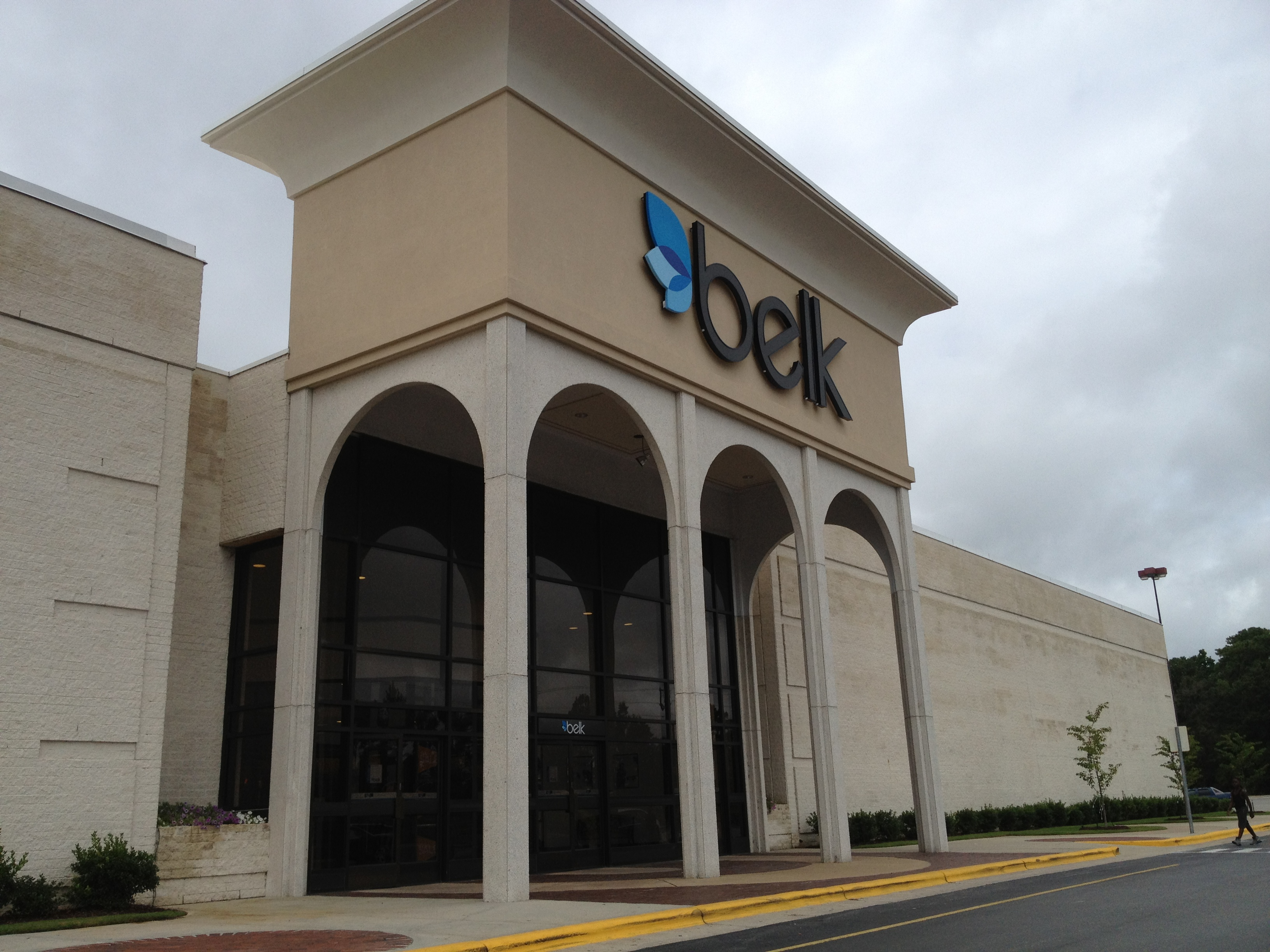
Belk at New Bern Mall, August 2012

The New Bern Mall is a shopping mall located in New Bern, North Carolina that opened in 1979. Its anchors are Belk, T.J. Maxx and Sears Hometown. The mall opened as Twin Rivers Mall. On June 4, 2020, it was announced that JCPenney would be closing at the mall, as part of a 154-store closing round.
