= Sumter Mall =

Coordinates: 33.94986°N 80.37256°W

- Location: Sumter, South Carolina
- Opened: August 6, 1980; 46 years ago
- Developer: Jim Wilson & Associates
- Owner: Hull Property Group
- Num. of stores: 46
- Num. of anchor tenants: 4 (3 open, 1 vacant)
- Floor area: 345,000 square feet (32,100 m^{2})
- Floors: 1

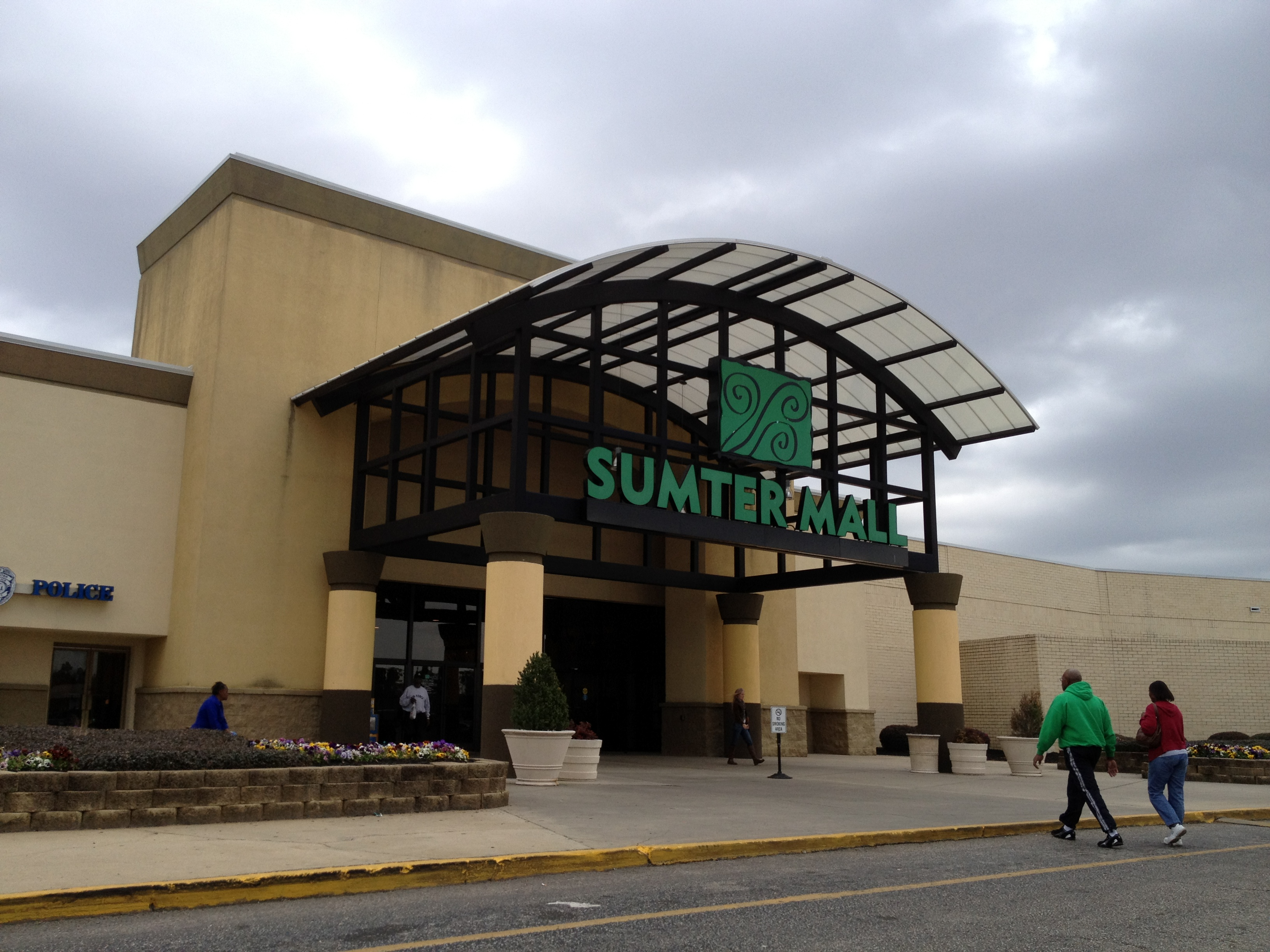
Entrance to Sumter Mall, February 2012

Sumter Mall, formerly Jessamine Mall, is a 43-acre shopping mall located in Sumter, South Carolina. The anchors are Belk, Roses, and a Foundever call center.

== History ==
In 1979, the mall was announced by Jim Wilson with Belk and JCPenney as anchors. The mall cost $12.5 million to build and was named Jessamine Mall, sometimes referred to as Jasmine Mall, after the state flower of South Carolina. The mall opened on August 6, 1980. On August 21, 1980, business was announced to be excellent at the mall with people traveling from surrounding areas to shop there. In 1989 a 53,000 square foot Sears was announced for the mall.

In 2000, the mall was sold to Hull Storey Gibson who cited Sumter's position as the retail and financial center of the surrounding area as the reason for purchasing the mall. In 2002, the mall was renovated and renamed Sumter Mall. In 2003, the mall had its grand opening under its new name. The mall is one of the county's largest taxpayers, paying $1.3 million annually. The mall is fully enclosed and employs approximately 850 people. The mall's size was originally reported as being 431,617 square feet, but was later reported as 345,000 square feet.

In 2009, a Sykes Enterprises call center was announced for Sumter Mall. The call center opened on September 29, 2010, with attendance from Governor Mark Sanford.

In 2011, a Books-A-Million was announced for the mall, which has since been built.

On December 17, 2020, it was announced that JCPenney would be closing in March 2021 as part of a plan to close 15 stores nationwide.

Sykes was renamed Foundever in 2023.
