= Hudson Valley Mall =

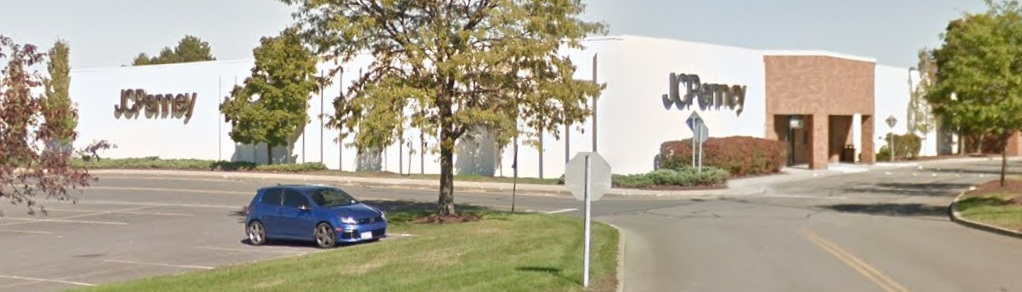
- A JCPenney in New York's Hudson Valley Mall. It closed in 2017.
- Location: Ulster, New York, United States
- Coordinates: 41.966734°N 73.983822°W
- Opened: 1981
- Developer: The Pyramid Company
- Owner: Hull Property Group
- Num. of stores: 9 (8 open, 1 vacant)
- Num. of anchor tenants: 2
- Floor area: 765,704 sq ft (71,136 m^{2})
- Floors: 1
- Website: shophudsonvalleymall.com

Hudson Valley Mall is an enclosed shopping mall located in Ulster, New York, north of Kingston, United States. It is the lone mall in Ulster County and is the only enclosed mall located between Poughkeepsie and Albany. Hull Property Group currently owns and operates Hudson Valley Mall. The mall opened in 1981 and has an area of 765,704 square feet (71,136 m^{2}) on one level with 19 shops and restaurants as well as a 12-screen Neighborhood Cinema Group theater. As of 2026, the mall's last remaining anchor store was a Target.

== History ==
The Hudson Valley Mall opened in October 1981 with anchor stores including Kmart, JCPenney, Hess's, and a Hoyts six-screen theater known as Cinema 6, which was later expanded to 12 screens and rebranded under Regal Cinemas.

In 1989, the mall expanded to include a Sears on the east side, a new food court, and approximately 15 additional stores, with Sears having relocated from the Kingston Plaza.

In 1995, Hess's closed due to bankruptcy and was replaced by Filene's the following year, while Kmart relocated to a nearby Super Kmart along U.S. Route 9W (which later closed and was replaced by a Kohl's).

In the early 2000s, Pyramid Companies, the mall's owner, renovated the mall interior and brought in new tenants, splitting the former Kmart space into Best Buy (opened in 2000) and Dick's Sporting Goods (opened in 2001), and adding a Target store next to these spaces in 2001.

GameStop, originally operating as EB Games, had been a longtime tenant, and after GameStop acquired EB Games in 2005, the store transitioned to the GameStop name by around 2008 and remained one of the longest-lasting stores in the mall.

In May 2006, Rita's Water Ice opened, and on September 9, 2006, Filene's was rebranded as Macy's.

By 2007, the mall featured over 80 stores.

JCPenney closed in April 2015, which was part of the company's plan to close underperforming stores. This was followed by Macy's in April 2016, and by Sears in April 2018 as part of that company's broader downsizing strategy.

Regal Cinemas closed its 12-screen theater in August 2018, ending first-run cinema service at the mall, and in early 2019 NCG Cinema took over the space, becoming the only NCG location in New York and remaining open thereafter.

Old Navy closed the location in January 2019, relocating to Kings Mall (in the former Modell's Sporting Goods location), while Kingston Athletics moved into the Hudson Valley Mall later that year in October.

Best Buy closed in October 2020, and in March 2021 its former location was repurposed into Ulster County's main COVID-19 vaccination site, capable of administering up to 2,500 doses daily and accommodating 300 vehicles, before that site closed in February 2023.

Spirit Halloween began occupying former big-box space at the mall from 2020 to 2023 before relocating off-site, leaving portions of the property vacant again.

Dick's Sporting Goods received approval from the Town of Ulster to relocate from its mall location into the former Gander Mountain/Gander Outdoors site at the adjacent Hudson Valley Plaza, and as of June 2025 work was underway at the new location but the move had not yet been completed. Subsequent reporting indicated that Dick's was expected to remain open at Hudson Valley Mall until early 2026, with the new Hudson Valley Plaza store planned to open in March 2026. As of March 17, 2026, the store was in transition, with its mall location largely cleared out but still listed as an active tenant during the relocation period.

The United States Postal Service branch at Hudson Valley Mall permanently closed on May 29, 2025, with postal services for customers redirected to the Kingston Post Office on Cornell Street and other nearby locations.

Hudson Valley Mall Dental officially closed on May 29, 2025, and as of that date the mall no longer had an operating dental office, despite earlier reports that a new provider might take over the space.

Beginning in the mid-2020s, the mall experienced a continued decline in traditional retail occupancy along with ongoing property maintenance concerns, including deteriorating parking lot conditions and reduced upkeep of infrastructure.

As of 2026, Hudson Valley Mall hosts a significantly reduced number of tenants, reflecting its transition from a traditional enclosed mall to a mixed-use community site. Remaining occupants include Target and NCG Cinema as primary anchors. Several former anchor and retail spaces, including the Dick's Sporting Goods location, are in the process of becoming vacant following tenant relocations.

== 2005 shooting ==
On February 13, 2005, Robert Bonelli, aged 24, of Glasco, New York, entered the mall with a semi-automatic AK-47 Variant and began firing it in the mall's Best Buy shop. Panic ensued as employees and shoppers began to flee the mall. Bonelli moved into the mall's main corridor and continued firing his weapon until he ran out of ammunition. He had two 30-round magazines, and fired a total of 60 shots. After emptying the assault rifle, he promptly dropped it. As Bonelli dropped the weapon, a mall employee grabbed his gun, and another tackled him. The mall was evacuated and Bonelli was taken into custody. No one was killed in the shooting, but two people, a 20-year-old National Guard recruiter and a 56-year-old male shopper, were wounded.

After the incident, Ulster County investigators searched Bonelli's room at the home he shared with his father, and found what Ulster County District Attorney Donald Williams described as "Columbine memorabilia". Officials described the young man as being fascinated by the Columbine High School massacre. Additional searches were conducted by police after videos seized at Bonelli's residence showed him exploding homemade pipe bombs with a man named Kenneth Stine and another individual. Both individuals were later arrested and charged with violating federal explosives laws.

Bonelli was taken to the Ulster County jail; on March 15, 2006, he pleaded guilty and on May 20, 2006, was sentenced to 32 years in the state prison (the maximum allowed by the guilty plea). He will be eligible for parole after 26 years.

== See also ==
- List of shopping malls in the United States
