= Danville Mall =

Shopping mall in Virginia, US

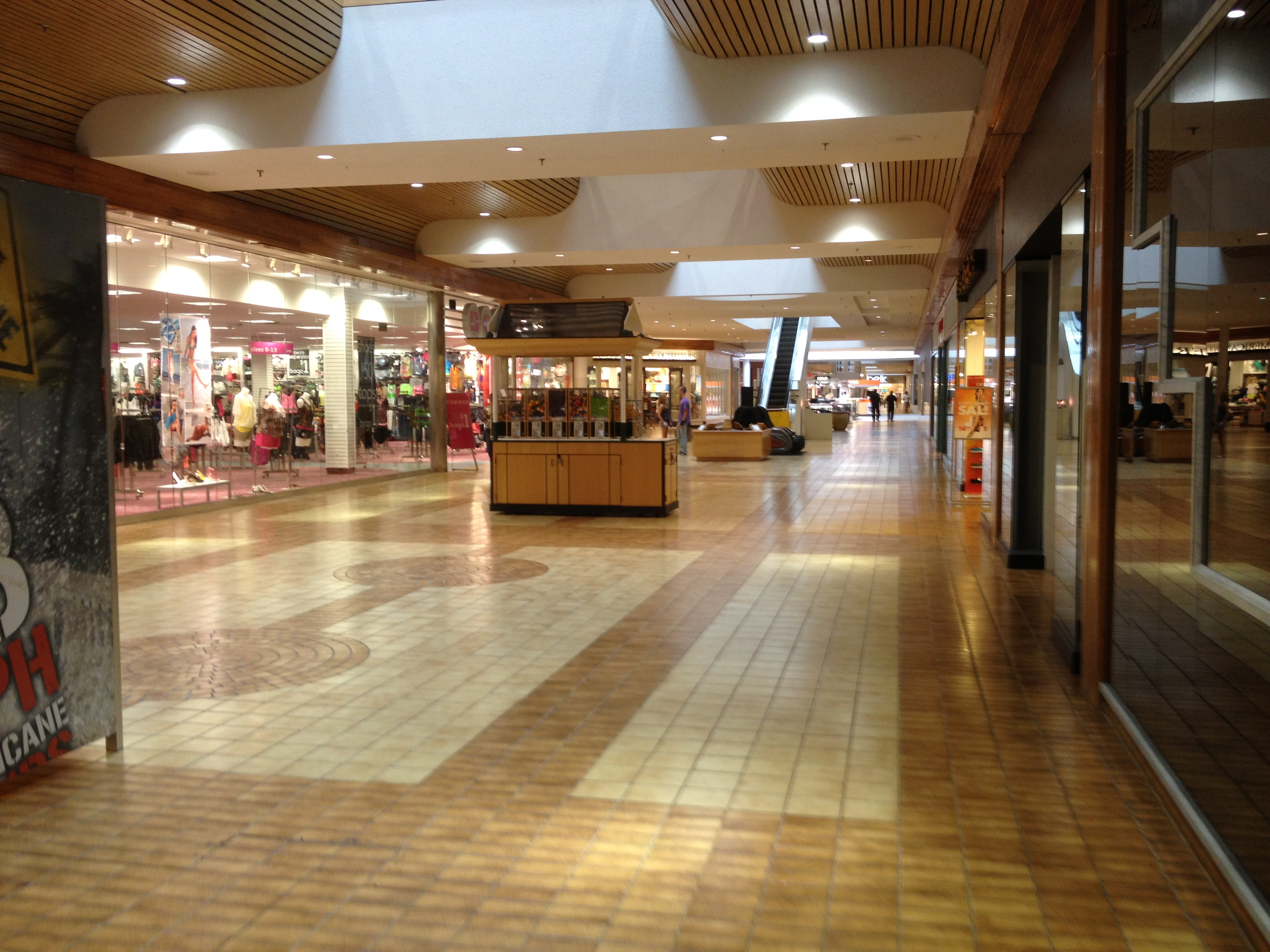
- Interior view in June 2012 before renovation
- Location: Danville, Virginia
- Coordinates: 36°35′37″N 79°25′17″W
- Address: 325 Piedmont Drive
- Opened: 1984
- Developer: Piedmont Mall Associates
- Owner: Hull Property Group
- Num. of stores: 55+
- Num. of anchor tenants: 5 (2 open, 3 vacant)
- Floor area: 731,500 sq ft (68,000 m^{2})
- Floors: 2

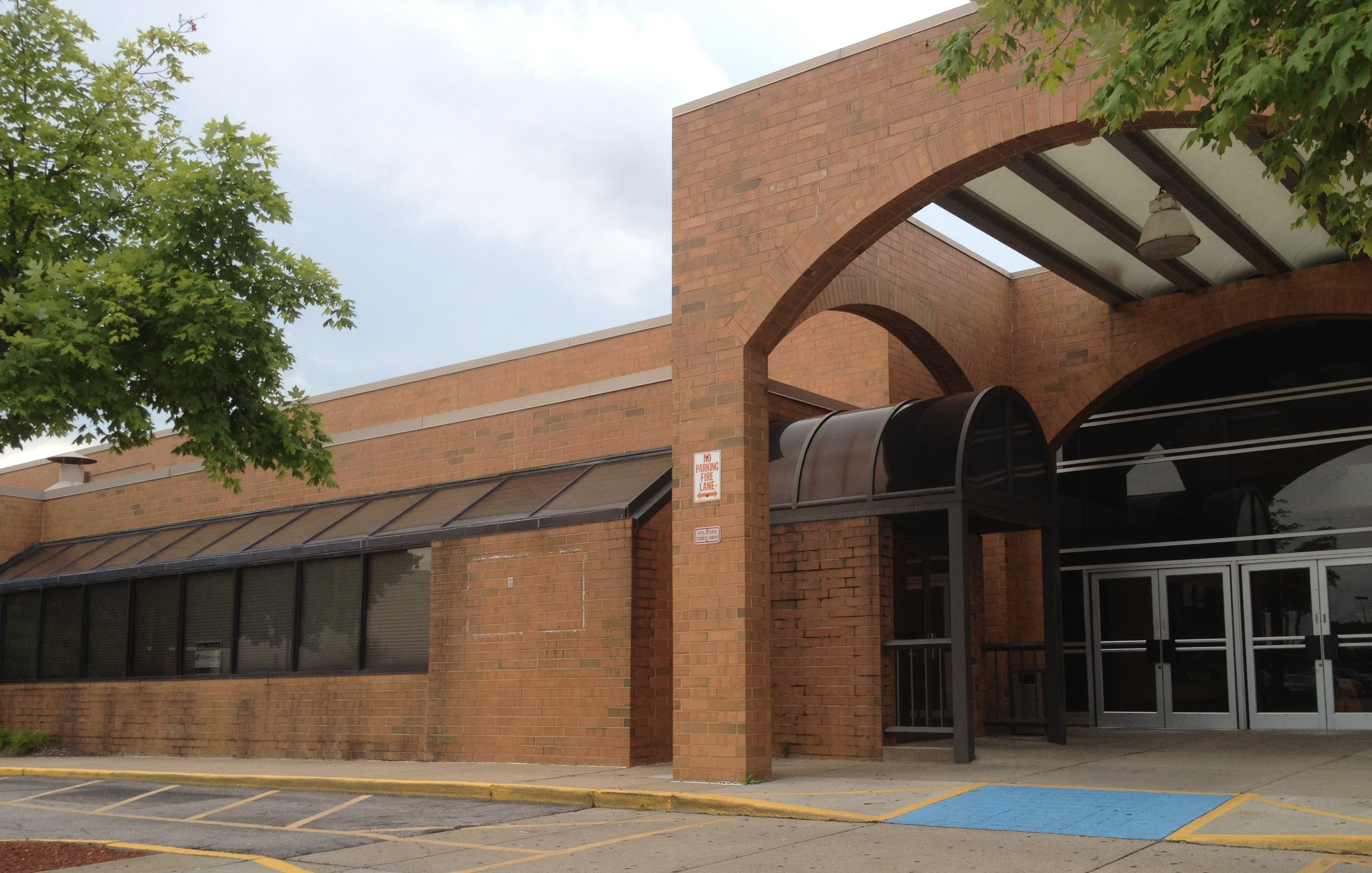
Exterior in 2012

Danville Mall, formerly Piedmont Mall, is an enclosed shopping mall in Danville, Virginia. Opened in 1984, it is managed by Hull Property Group. The mall's anchor stores are Belk and Dunham's Sports, with three vacant anchors last occupied by Boscov's, JCPenney, and Sears.

== History ==
The original anchors of Piedmont Mall were J. C. Penney, Hills, Belk-Leggett, and Globman's, which closed in 1990 and was later an auxiliary store for Belk. Sears was added as a fifth anchor in 1995. That same year, General Growth Properties bought the mall.

The Hills store was sold to Ames and closed in 2001. In November 2005, the former Hills/Ames space became the first Boscov's store in Virginia. However, it closed in 2008, as one of 10 unprofitable stores after filing for Chapter 11 bankruptcy.

Hull Storey Gibson bought the mall in 2012 after General Growth filed for bankruptcy. Under Hull Storey Gibson's ownership, major renovation plans were announced, and the property was renamed Danville Mall. As part of these renovations, the Belk store was remodeled, and the second Belk was closed. In November 2015, Dunham's Sports opened on the lower level of the former Boscov's store.

On May 3, 2018, it was announced that Sears would be closing as part of a plan to close 42 stores nationwide. The store closed in August 2018.

On June 4, 2020, it was announced that JCPenney would be closing around October 2020 as part of a plan to close 154 stores nationwide, leaving Belk and Dunham's Sports as the only remaining anchor stores.
