= Citrus Park Town Center =

Shopping mall in Florida, US

Coordinates: 28.065943°N 82.575536°W

- Location: Citrus Park, Florida, USA
- Address: 8021 Citrus Park Town Center, Tampa, FL 33625
- Opened: March 3, 1999; 27 years ago
- Previous names: Citrus Park Town Center (1999–2002); Westfield Citrus Park (2002–2020)
- Developer: Urban Shopping Centers, Inc.
- Manager: Hull Property Group
- Owner: Hull Property Group
- Num. of stores: 202
- Num. of anchor tenants: 6
- Floor area: 1.0 million ft^{2}
- Floors: 1 (2 in anchors except Dick's Sporting Goods)
- Website: visitcitruspark.com

Citrus Park Town Center, previously Westfield Citrus Park, is a shopping mall in Citrus Park, Florida. The anchor stores are Dillard's, JCPenney, Macy's, NCG Cinemas, Dick's Sporting Goods, and Elev8 Fun. Sears formerly occupied the space now occupied by Elev8 Fun.

== History ==
The mall opened as Citrus Park Town Center on March 3, 1999. Westfield Group acquired the shopping center in May 2002, and renamed it Westfield Shoppingtown Citrus Park, and then Westfield Citrus Park in June 2005. On May 31, 2018, it was announced that Sears would close as part of a plan to close 63 stores nationwide. The store closed on September 2, 2018. In December 2020, Unibail-Rodamco-Westfield surrendered the mall to their lenders, and it was reverted to its previous name. Elev8 Fun, a family entertainment complex, opened in the former Sears space in May 2023.

In June 2023, the Regal Cinemas theater shut down. NCG Cinemas took over the movie theater space in March 2024, however, only one of the two floors is used now.
