= Regency Square Mall =

Regency Square Mall may refer to:

- Regency Square Mall (Jacksonville, Florida)
- Florence Mall, Florence, Alabama, formerly known as Regency Square Mall
- Regency Mall (Richmond, Virginia), formerly known as Regency Square
