= Mount Berry Mall =

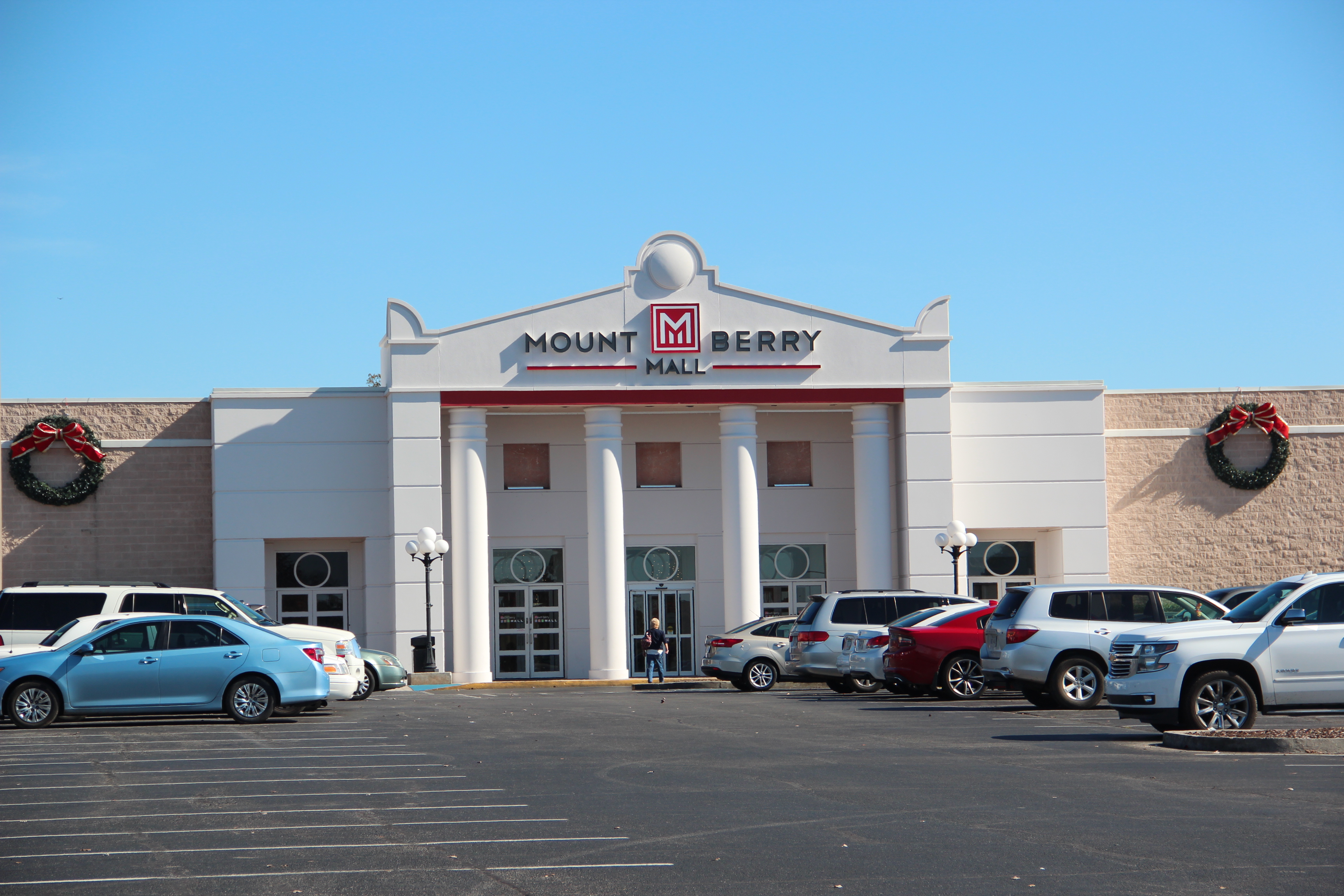
- Location: Rome, Georgia
- Coordinates: 34°18′6.0″N 85°10′18″W
- Address: 2770 Martha Berry Highway
- Opened: February 13, 1991
- Developer: Crown American and Homart Development Company
- Manager: Hull Property Group
- Architect: Crawford McWilliams Hatcher Architects, Inc.
- Num. of stores: 23
- Num. of anchor tenants: 3
- Floor area: 476,778 square feet (44,294.1 m^{2})
- Floors: 1
- Website: shopmountberrymall.com

Mount Berry Mall, previously named Mount Berry Square, stands as a single-level enclosed shopping destination situated in Rome, Georgia. Serving as the sole enclosed mall within the city, it first opened its doors in 1991. The mall features Belk, Dunham's Sports, and Rural King as its anchor stores and is currently under the ownership and management of the Hull Property Group.

== 1988-1993: Planning and early years ==
Plans for Mount Berry Square trace back to March 23, 1988, with construction and timber clearing starting in the summer of 1989. This joint venture development between Crown American and Homart Development Company officially opened on February 13, 1991, featuring anchor tenants JCPenney, Sears, Belk-Rhodes, and Hess's, all replacing existing stores in Rome. Restaurants at the food court also operated for the first time, most notably a Chick-fil-A. The restaurant has since been renamed to Chick-Fil-A Dwarf Classics since 2013.

The mall's architectural design was executed by Crawford McWilliams Hatcher Architects, Inc.

JCPenney and Belk-Rhodes introduced new store designs with a heightened emphasis on fashion. The Hess's store closed in 1993, later replaced by Proffitt's. The current occupant of the space is Dunham's Sports, which opened in late 2013.

== 2003-2010: Later years ==
On November 22, 2003, PREIT acquired all 26 shopping malls owned by Crown American, including Mount Berry Square. Before the merger, Crown American had identified this property as one of 6 "non-core" assets to be divested after the completion of the merger. In 2003, the mall's occupancy rate was 73.3%, lower than the average for Crown American properties at that time, which stood at 93.0%.

On September 29, 2004, PREIT sold Mount Berry Square, along with four other shopping malls designated as "non-core" properties by Crown American, to the Lightstone Group's Prime Retail]] division. In October 2005, it was announced that the Proffitt's store at the mall would transition to become a second Belk store, following Belk's acquisition of 47 Proffitt's and McRae's stores. Eventually, this Belk store closed and was succeeded by Dunham's Sports.

In June 2010, news broke that Mount Berry Square would undergo foreclosure on July 6, 2010, due to Lightstone defaulting on loans totaling $73.9 million and another for $7 million. Three of the four properties purchased from PREIT by Lightstone, including Mount Berry Square, were implicated in the default. Jones Lang LaSalle managed the mall and the other foreclosed properties during this period as a receiver. Subsequently, on August 23, 2010, Urban Retail Properties assumed management responsibilities for Mount Berry Square and two additional properties from Lightstone's portfolio.

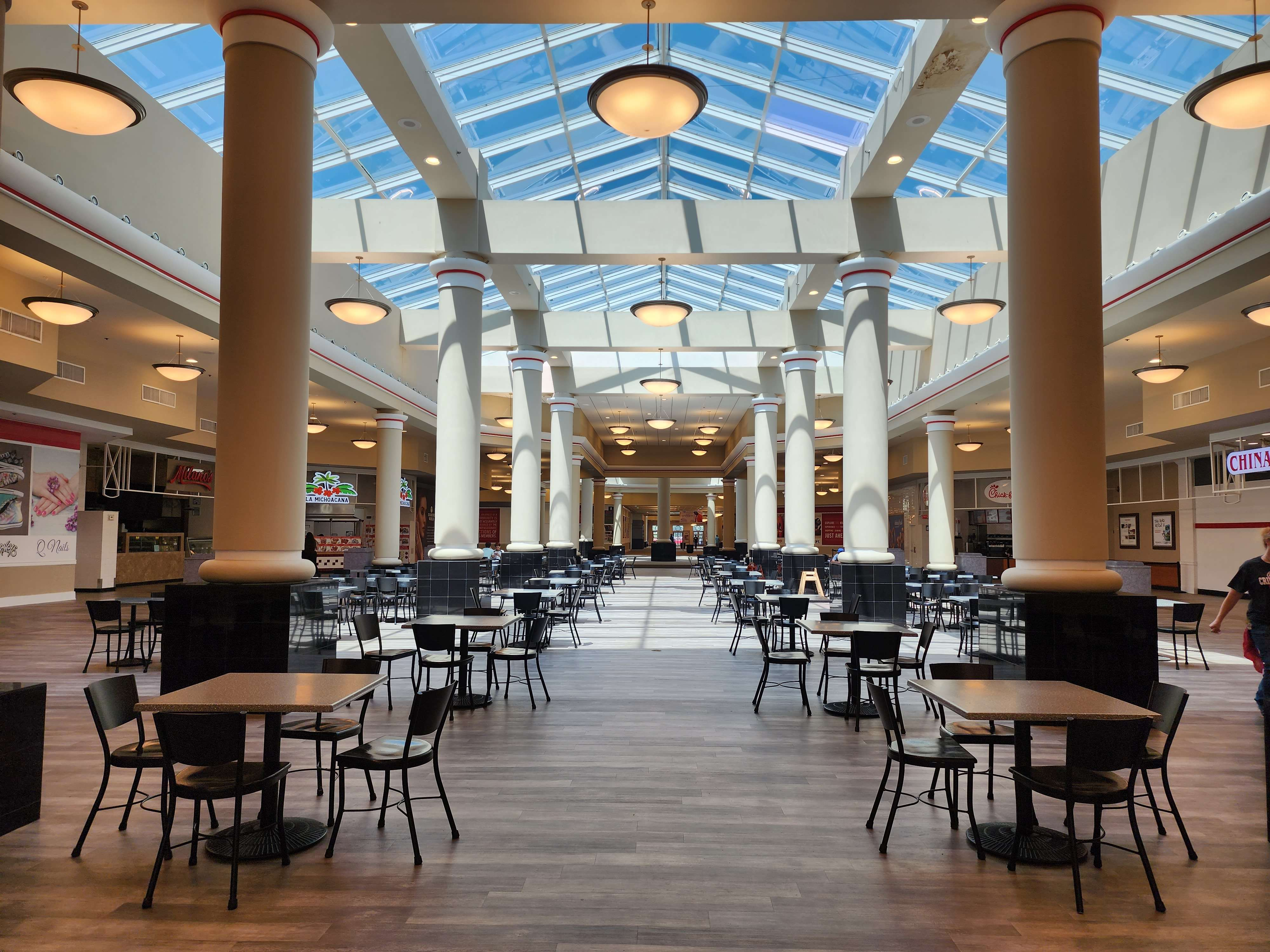
The food court of Mount Berry Mall

== 2012-present: New stores ==
In October 2012, Hull Property Group, based in Augusta, revealed their acquisition of the mall. In January 2016, Sears announced its impending closure, scheduled for March 26, 2016. In 2020, Hull Property Group initiated renovations at the mall, including the installation of new flooring and lighting, enhancements to public restrooms, and improvements to the HVAC system. Concurrently, they decided to rename the mall as Mount Berry Mall.

In June 2020, news surfaced that JCPenney would cease operations around October 2020 as part of a nationwide plan to close 154 stores. Following the closure of JCPenney, Dunham's Sports and Belk stood as the sole remaining anchor tenants until Rural King opened. In 2025, it was announced that Rural King will open in the former Sears location as its anchor tenant. Construction on the new anchor tenant began in August 2025 and Rural King opened on March 19, 2026.
