= Columbia Mall (Tennessee) =

American shopping mall

Coordinates: 35.59816°N 87.0549°W

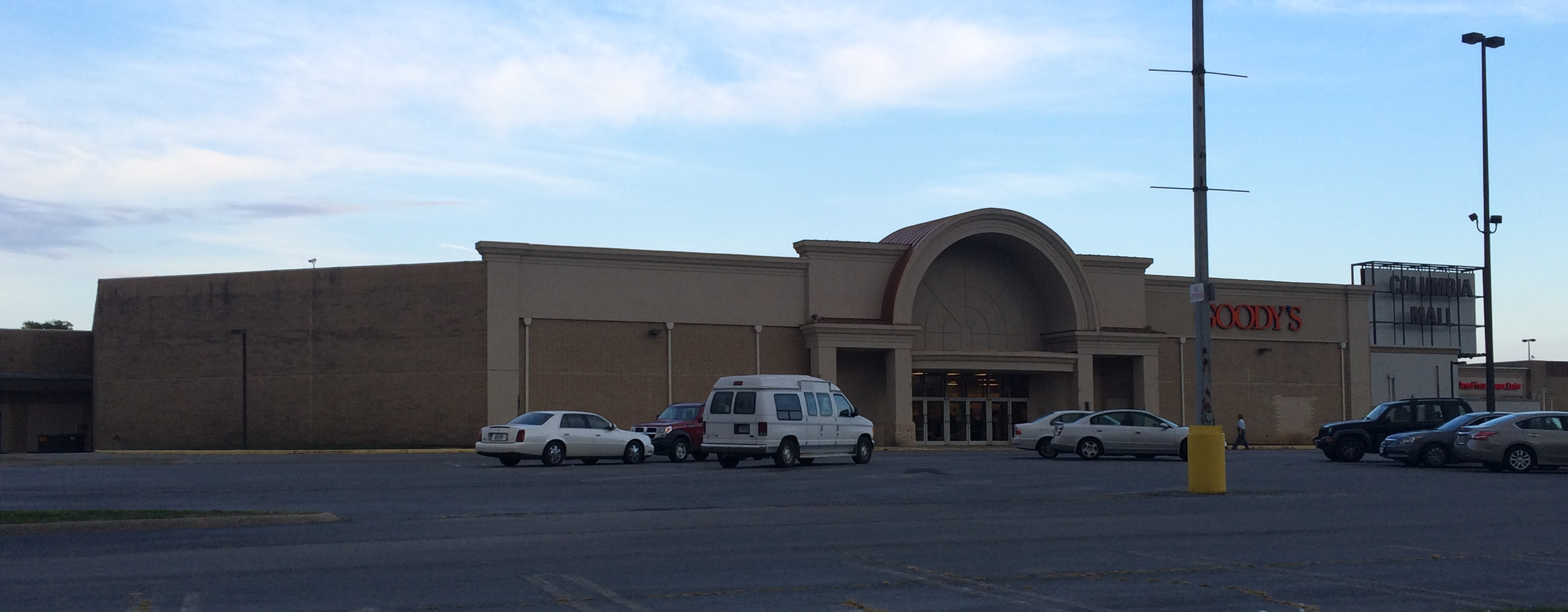
- Exterior view of Columbia Mall in September 2014
- Location: Columbia, Tennessee
- Opened: 1981 (original indoor mall) 2024 (current strip mall)
- Closed: 2024 (original indoor mall)
- Previous names: Shady Brook Mall
- Developer: Equitable Life
- Owner: Hull Property Group
- Num. of stores: 1
- Num. of anchor tenants: 0
- Floor area: 282,272 square feet (26,223.9 m^{2})
- Floors: 1

The Columbia Mall (currently a strip mall) was an enclosed 282,272 square foot shopping mall located in Columbia, Tennessee that opened in 1981 originally as the Shadybrook Mall. Goody's, one of the anchors, closed in early 2017. On June 4, 2020, JCPenney, the only other anchor, announced that it would close by around October 2020 as part of a plan to close 154 stores nationwide. In 2012, a medical center was built at the mall.

The mall was largely torn down in 2024 and rebuilt as a strip mall, featuring Academy Sports + Outdoors, Five Below, and Bealls.
