= Fairgrounds Square Mall =

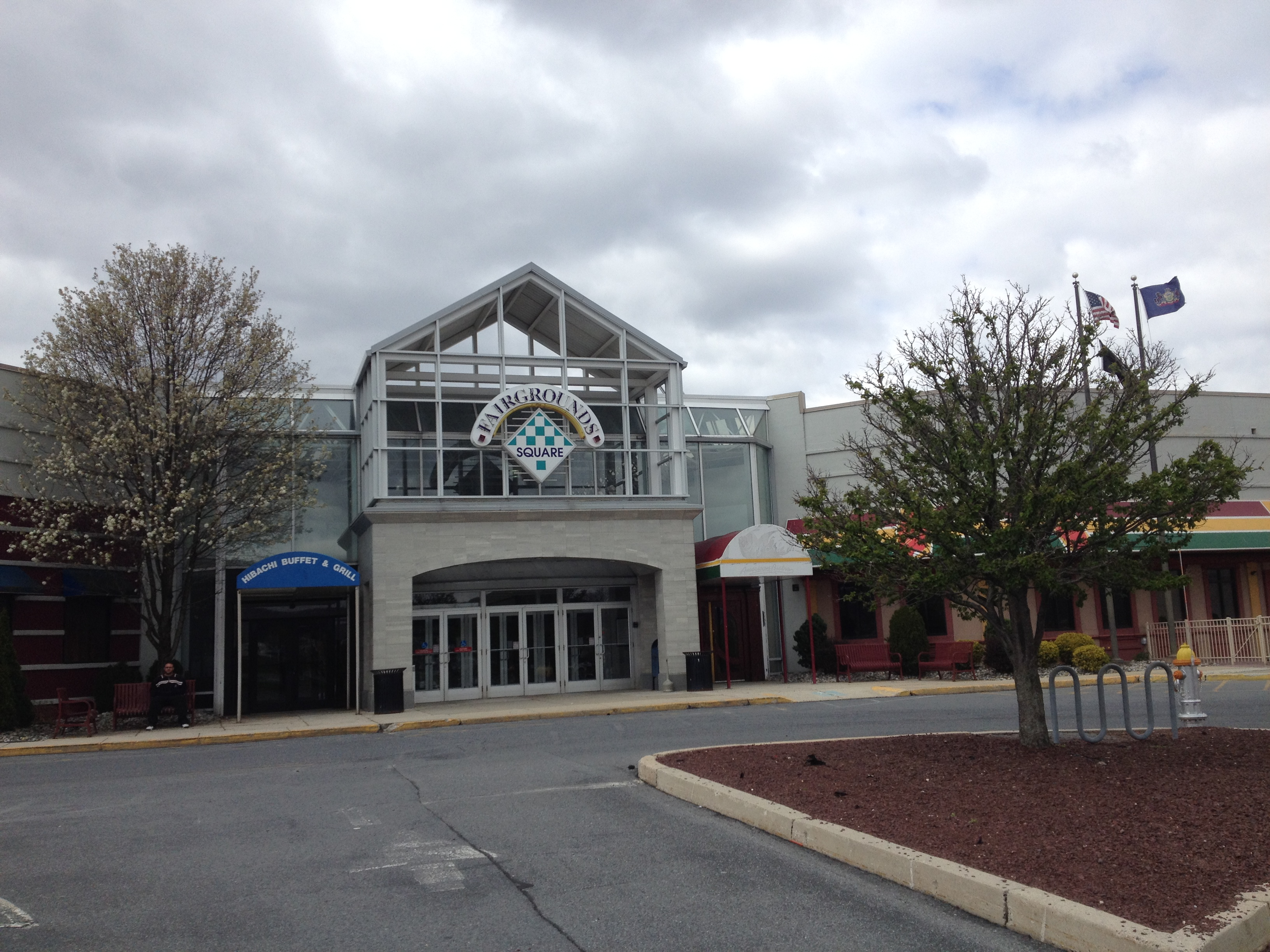
- Southeast entrance to Fairgrounds Square Mall in 2016
- Location: Muhlenberg Township, Berks County, Pennsylvania, United States
- Coordinates: 40.381312°N 75.930172°W
- Address: 3050 N. 5th St. Highway
- Opened: October 1980
- Closed: April 30, 2018
- Developer: Interstate Properties
- Owner: Hull Property Group
- Num. of stores: 75 (at peak)
- Num. of anchor tenants: 3
- Floor area: 725,000 square feet (67,400 m^{2})
- Floors: 1 (2 in Boscov's and Burlington Coat Factory)
- Parking: Parking lot
- Public transit: BARTA bus: 1, 2
- Website: web.archive.org/web/20221202064912/http://www.shopatfairgrounds.com/

Fairgrounds Square Mall was an enclosed shopping mall located just north of Reading, Pennsylvania in Muhlenberg Township. It was anchored by Boscov's, Burlington Coat Factory, and Limerick Furniture. Smaller stores included Super Shoes, Planet Fitness, an AMC Classic movie theater, and Golden Eagle Comics. The mall, which once had 75 stores, had 14 stores and many vacant storefronts before it closed in 2018. It was located on 5th Street Highway (U.S. 222 Business)

== History ==
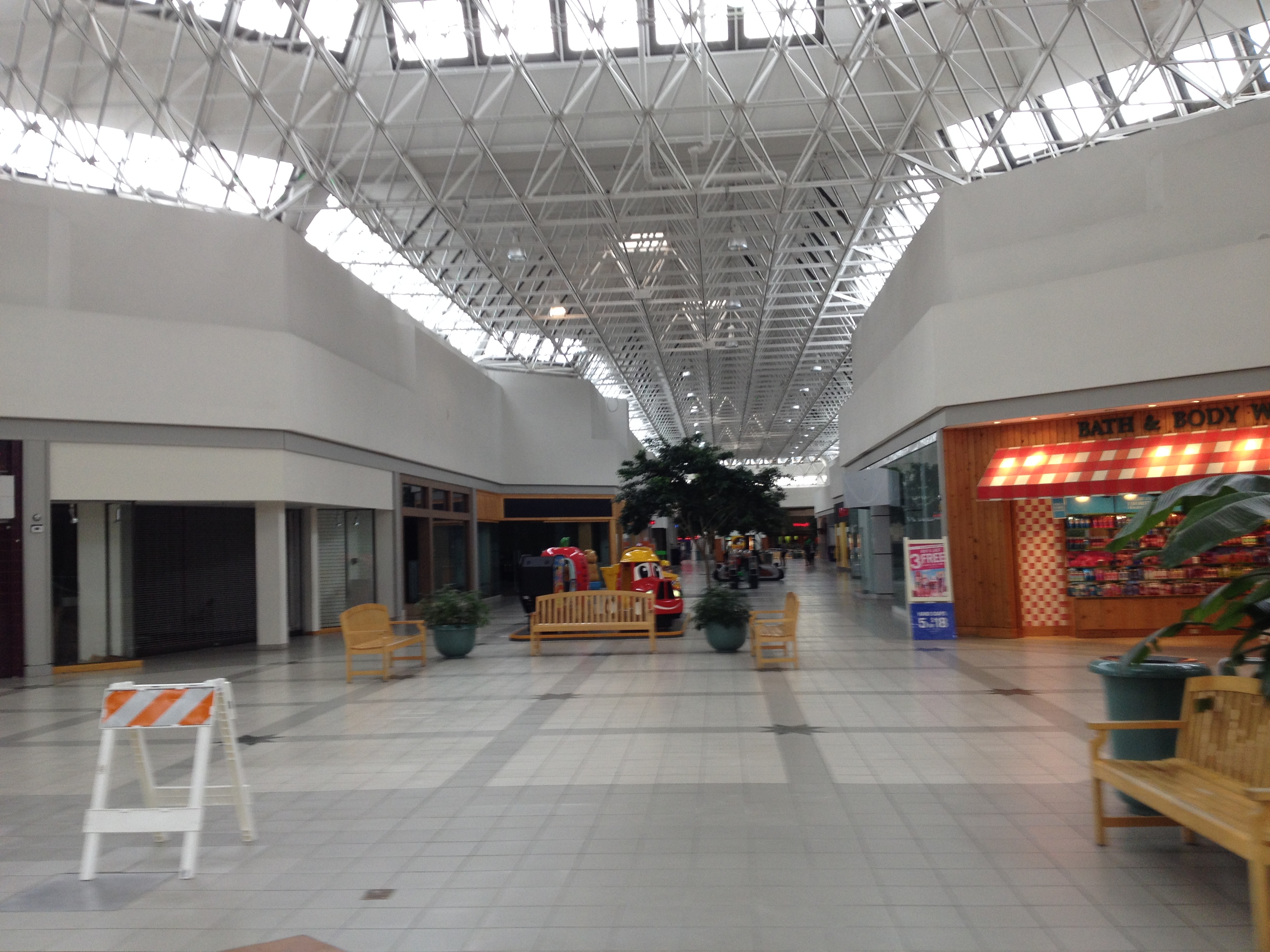
Interior of Fairgrounds Square Mall in 2016

The Fairgrounds Square Mall was developed by Interstate Properties, constructed by F&S Construction along with the Owner, Frank Saffiotti, and under the supervision of Gus, Job Site Superintendent and the Office Manager, Rebecca L. Simpson, CCA working with a labor union membership workforce representing various unions throughout the region. The mall officially opened in October 1980, with Boscov's and JCPenney serving as anchors. The mall was constructed at the former location of the Reading Fairgrounds Speedway; the Boscov's store opened as a freestanding store adjacent to the speedway in August 1965. A year later, it was purchased by First Union Real Estate Investments. A mall expansion in 1988 added several more stores as well as Phar-Mor. The mall was renovated in 1996, at which point a Montgomery Ward was built as a third anchor. The Montgomery Ward store closed in 1999. The same year, the mall was sold to Jager Management affiliate GP Properties Inc and JCPenney converted its store into an outlet format. In 2000, Jason's Furniture Outlet opened in the former Montgomery Ward anchor space. A National Wholesale Liquidators store opened in the location of Jason's Furniture Outlet in 2003, which had relocated to the former Phar-Mor.

In 2005, Burlington Coat Factory replaced National Wholesale Liquidators, and Jason's became Super Shoes and Planet Fitness. In 2011, it was announced that the JCPenney Outlet would be closing as part of JCPenney's plan to eliminate outlet stores. However, it was later announced that the JCPenney Outlet division was purchased by SB Capital Group, and rebranded as JC's 5 Star Outlet. Mall owner GP-Fairgrounds Square LP defaulted on its mortgage, which led to the mall being sold to BNY Mellon for $13.6 million in a U.S. Marshals auction on March 7, 2013. JC's Five Star Outlet closed November 30, 2013. In November 2014, Limerick Furniture opened in the former JC's Five Star Outlet space, moving from a former site in St. Lawrence. On April 13, 2016, Hull Property Group took over the Fairgrounds Square Mall, with plans to revitalize the mall. In early February 2018, Limerick Furniture announced it will be closing its Fairgrounds Square Mall location due to low foot traffic and the rise of online shopping, leaving Burlington Coat Factory and Boscov's as the mall's two remaining anchor stores.

As of March 2018, Fairgrounds Square Mall had 12 tenants remaining, down from a peak of 75 stores. On April 30, 2018, Hull Property Group closed the interior of the mall. Limerick Furniture closed their mall entrance a few days before the mall closed, then closed a day or two later after the mall closed. Boscov's, Burlington Coat Factory, AMC Classic, Super Shoes, Planet Fitness, Baja Beach Tanning Club, and Quest Diagnostics remained open after the mall closed.

Hull Property Group had plans to redevelop the Fairgrounds Square Mall site. The redevelopment plan would demolish 68.1 percent of the mall, leaving Boscov's, Burlington Coat Factory, AMC Classic, Super Shoes, and Planet Fitness. The former site of the mall would be converted into green space with some retail stores. Other developments planned included townhomes, a hotel, and a restaurant. Plans for the redevelopment had been put on hold by a tax incentive from Muhlenberg Township that makes it impossible to redevelop the site and attract new tenants without demolishing the existing mall first. In May 2019, the tax incentive from Muhlenberg Township was denied, as the township felt the redevelopment plans were vague. As a result of the denial, Hull Property Group withdrew their redevelopment plans and announced they will continue to maintain the closed mall. However, on June 13, 2019, Hull Property Group announced it will apply for a permit to demolish 80 percent of the mall for redevelopment, leaving open tenants such as Boscov's, Burlington, Planet Fitness, Super Shoes and AMC Classic in place. Demolition of the Fairgrounds Square Mall began in March 2020. Burlington relocated to the former OfficeMax space across 5th Street Highway in late 2022.
