= Eastgate Mall (Cincinnati) =

Shopping mall in Cincinnati, Ohio

Coordinates: 39.10291°N 84.27773°W

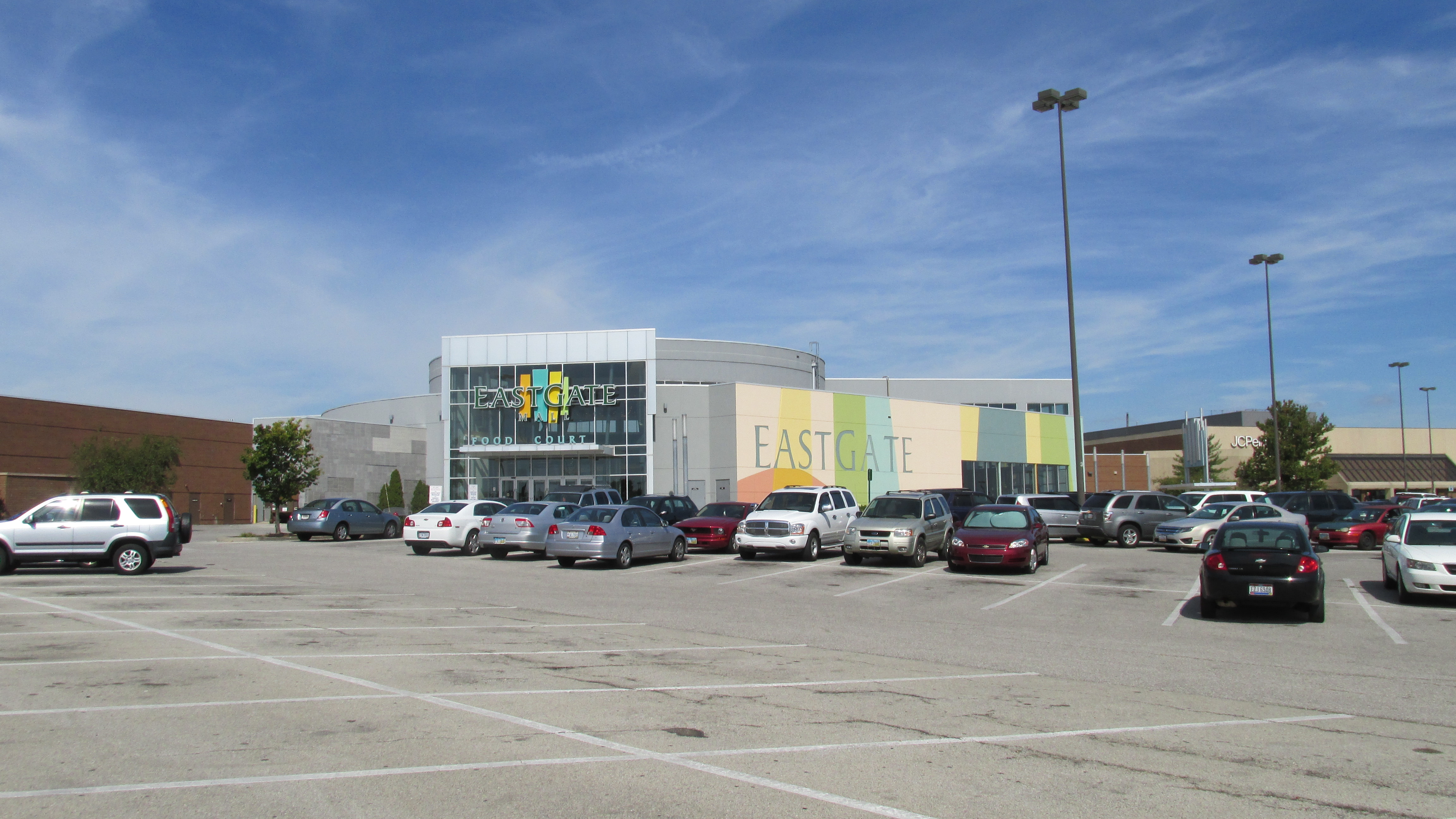
- Location: Cincinnati, OH, United States
- Opened: 1980
- Developer: Jacobs Visconsi & Jacobs, Homart Development Company, JCP Realty, and Cincinnati Partners
- Manager: Hull Property Group
- Owner: Hull Property Group
- Num. of stores: 55
- Num. of anchor tenants: 4 (3 open, 1 vacant)
- Floor area: 1,066,654 square feet (99,095.4 m^{2})
- Floors: 1 (2 in Dillard's Clearance Center (only 1st floor used), JCPenney, Kohl's, and former Sears)
- Parking: 4,831 spaces
- Website: visiteastgatemall.com

Eastgate Mall is a shopping mall located in Glen Este, Ohio, in the suburbs of Cincinnati, Ohio. The mall contains over 55 stores. The anchor stores are Dillard's, Kohl's, and JCPenney. There is 1 vacant anchor store that was once Sears. Hull Property Group owns and manages the mall (As of September 6, 2023). In 1988, Tom Cruise and Dustin Hoffman made a public appearance upon the release of the hit film Rain Man.

== History ==
Jacobs Visconsi & Jacobs jointly developed Eastgate Mall with Homart Development Company, J.C.P. Realty, and Cincinnati Partners. Construction began in 1974, with J. C. Penney and Sears confirmed as anchor stores. At opening day, the mall featured these two stores, along with 90 other tenants and space for two additional department stores.

McAlpin's opened to the public in 1992. It would be renamed Dillard's in 1998. On August 4, 1995, Kohl's would officially open as the mall's fourth anchor store.

In March 2015, Dillard's was transformed into a clearance center and the number of floors was reduced to just one.

On August 31, 2019, it was announced that Sears would be closing this location as a part of a plan to close 85 stores nationwide. The store closed on December 15, 2019.

On July 30, 2021 it was announced that Kroger bought the former Sears location at Eastgate Mall. It is unclear, as of March 2026, what Kroger plans to do with the former Sears building.
