= Greenwood Mall (South Carolina) =

Shopping mall in Greenwood, South Carolina, United States

Coordinates: 34.21°N 82.18°W

- Location: Greenwood, South Carolina, United States
- Opened: August 8, 1979; 47 years ago
- Previous names: Crosscreek Mall
- Developer: Jim Wilson and Associates
- Owner: Hull Property Group
- Num. of stores: 16 (2022)
- Num. of anchor tenants: 4 (3 open, 1 Vacant)
- Floor area: 350,000 sq ft (33,000 m^{2})
- Floors: 1
- Website: shopgreenwoodmall.com

Greenwood Mall, formerly Crosscreek Mall, is a regional shopping mall located in Greenwood, South Carolina, United States. The mall opened in 1979 and underwent a number of expansions and renovations throughout its history. The original anchor stores were Belk, JCPenney, and Meyers-Arnold, with H. J. Wilson Co. joining in the 1980s. The latter two stores became Uptons and Service Merchandise respectively in the 1980s. Following the closure of those stores, the mall was purchased by a new owner in 2000 and renamed three years later to Greenwood Mall. Renovations beginning in 2009 added The Shoe Dept., TJ Maxx, and Michaels among other stores. Despite these additions, the mall continued to struggle with vacancy, compounded by the closure of JCPenney in 2019. The remaining anchor stores are Belk and TJ Maxx. Hull Property Group owns the mall.

== History ==
Jim Wilson and Associates had first proposed to build a shopping mall in Greenwood, South Carolina in 1973 and acquired land for it that year. Although the firm had negotiated with Sears, that retailer decided against building a store in Greenwood and thus delayed plans. Despite this, Jim Wilson and Associates continued to develop the mall, which opened for business on August 8, 1979. Chosen as anchor stores for the mall were Belk, JCPenney, and Meyers-Arnold, a regional department store based out of Greenville, South Carolina. Overall, the mall held space for over 38 stores in 350,000 square feet (33,000 m^{2}) of retail space. It was the first major retail development along the Highway 72 bypass. Among the original stores were Eckerd Drug, Waldenbooks, Thom McAn shoe store, Regis hair salon, Kay Jewelers, Baskin-Robbins, and Chick-fil-A. In July 1981, Consolidated Theatres opened a movie theater within the mall. This was followed two months later by the opening of H. J. Wilson Co., a catalog showroom chain which became the mall's fourth anchor store. Despite having previously declined to build a store at the mall, Sears moved into Greenwood Mall in 1982 with a smaller format store which only featured appliances, home improvement items, and catalog sales. According to representatives of Sears, it was their first catalog store to be located within a mall in the Southern United States.

The mall underwent two changes in anchor stores in the 1980s. H. J. Wilson chain was sold to Service Merchandise in 1985 and all stores converted. Two years later, the Meyers-Arnold chain sold all of its stores to Uptons of Atlanta, Georgia.

In 1999, the mall's then-manager, Gil Sampson, addressed concerns from tenants that the mall was experiencing high vacancy, particularly with the then-impending closure of Service Merchandise due to bankruptcy. At the time, he stated that most of the vacancies were smaller local tenants, and that the mall had recently gained national chain stores such as Bath & Body Works. A directory published the same year indicated eight vacant spaces out of forty-seven. Uptons also went out of business in 1999, creating further vacancies at the mall.

Hull Storey Gibson (now Hull Property Group) purchased the mall from Jim Wilson and Associates in January 2000. Eckerd Drug closed a month later, indicating that chain's move toward free-standing locations. Hull renamed the property to Greenwood Mall in 2003 and announced renovation plans that same year. These included the installation of new lighting fixtures and reconstruction of the entryways. The former location of Service Merchandise remained vacant until 2009, when it was converted to a call center for Sykes Enterprises. Further renovations in 2009 included demolition of the theater, which had been operated by Carmike Cinemas but closed for several years prior. This was due to the theater's smaller size and Carmike's withdrawal from the market. By year's end, the former Uptons space was re-tenanted by The Shoe Dept., a division of Shoe Show.

In 2011, Hull renovated the mall even further. The Shoe Dept. relocated into the JCPenney wing, displacing several smaller stores and re-branding as Shoe Dept. Encore in the process. In addition, the previous location of The Shoe Dept. became TJ Maxx, while The Children's Place, rue21, and a Michaels craft store were also added. Despite these additions, the mall continued to experience a number of vacancies. In particular, Chick-fil-A relocated out of the mall in 2015 in favor of a standalone location in the parking lot. Hull Property Group covered up vacant storefronts with murals featuring pictures of the area, and representatives noted they were undergoing studies for the mall's long-term viability.

Further closures ensued in the 2010s. Sykes closed its call center at the mall in 2018. A year later, the JCPenney at Greenwood Mall was one of twenty-seven closed that year by the chain due to unprofitability. At the same time, other tenants within the mall noticed a decline in traffic, particularly due to the departure of JCPenney and the beginning of the COVID-19 pandemic. Michaels closed in 2021, increasing vacancy even further. In August 2022, Greenwood Charter Academy purchased the former Sykes Enterprises location with the intent of converting it to a charter school.
