= Victoria Mall =

- Location: Victoria, Texas, United States
- Coordinates: 28.86785°N 96.99437°W
- Address: 7802 N. Navarro St.
- Opened: 1981
- Developer: Charles Parrish and Associates
- Manager: Hull Storey Gibson
- Num. of stores: 70+
- Num. of anchor tenants: 7 (6 open, 1 vacant)
- Floor area: 678,996 sq ft (63,080.8 m^{2})
- Floors: 1

Victoria Mall is an enclosed shopping mall in Victoria, Texas. It opened in 1981 and is managed by Hull Storey Gibson. Anchor stores are Bealls, Best Buy, two Dillard's locations, JCPenney, and TJ Maxx.

== History ==
Dillard's opened at the mall in 1981. Other major tenants included O.G. Wilson, a catalog showroom chain owned by Zales, Sears, and Bealls. JCPenney moved into Victoria Mall from Town Plaza Mall in 1987.

Zales sold the O.G. Wilson chain in 1986, and the Victoria Mall location remained vacant until Dillard's opened an auxiliary store there in 1993. The same year, F.W. Woolworth closed its store at the mall.

Gap and sister chain Old Navy both joined the mall in 2000. Three years later, Hull Storey Gibson (then known as just Hull Storey) purchased the property. Further renovation in 2005 removed the food court, present since 1985, and relocated restaurants throughout the mall. Best Buy also joined in 2006. Jo-Ann Fabrics, which moved from an existing store in Victoria in 2000, closed in 2007.

Many inline tenants closed in the late 2000s, including Gap, Waldenbooks, f.y.e., Tuesday Morning, Old Navy and a sports bar. These vacancies were countered in 2011 by the addition of Burke's Outlet and TJ Maxx.

On October 15, 2018, it was announced that Sears would be closing as part of a plan to close 142 stores nationwide.
