= LaGrange Mall =

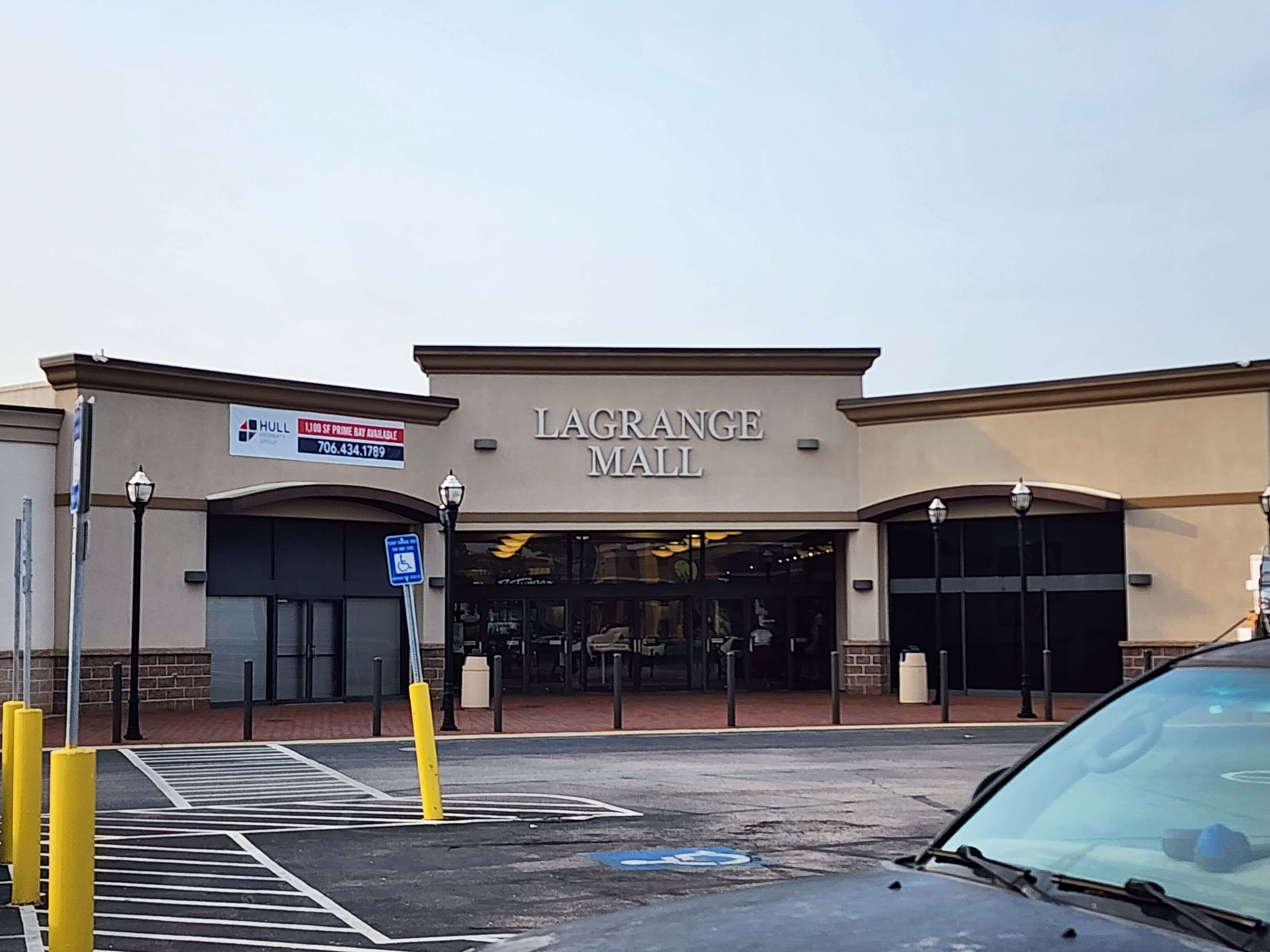
- Exterior view of the entrance to LaGrange Mall in July 2023.
- Location: LaGrange, Georgia, United States
- Coordinates: 33.04424°N 84.98149°W
- Address: 1501 Lafayette Parkway
- Opened: 1979
- Previous names: West Georgia Commons
- Developer: Retail Planning Corporation, Intereal Group, National Life and Accident Insurance
- Manager: Hull Property Group
- Owner: Hull Property Group
- Num. of stores: 22
- Num. of anchor tenants: 5
- Floor area: 233,000 square feet (22,000 m^{2})
- Floors: 1
- Parking: parking lot
- Website: lagrangemall.com

LaGrange Mall is a shopping mall located on Georgia State Route 109 in LaGrange, Georgia, United States, a few blocks west of Interstate 85. The mall is owned by Hull Property Group.

== Layout and history ==
The mall's anchors are Belk, Dunham's Sports, Hobby Lobby, and TJ Maxx. The mall is 233,000 square feet (22,000 m^{2}) in size. Located 65 miles southwest of Atlanta; it is the only mall in its immediate region, which has a population of just over 250,000.

The mall was built in 1978 and opened in 1979. Developers were Retail Planning Corporation, Intereal Group, and National Life and Accident Insurance. It was in an area of the county that was generally undeveloped at the time, and was renovated in 2001. The original name of the mall was "West Georgia Commons." When the mall opened, anchors Belk and JCPenney moved from downtown LaGrange to the mall. In May 2012, Belk announced that the store would undergo a $2 million remodel, the project was finished in October 2012. In 2013, a TJ Maxx was announced for the mall. In January 2015 JCPenney announced that it would shutter 39 stores in the U.S. which include the LaGrange Mall. Hull Properties announced in January 2017 that the former J. C. Penney would become Dunham's Sports, while a new Hobby Lobby would be constructed behind it. Dunham Sports opened on August 18, 2017. Hobby Lobby opened on December 29, 2017 while the ribbon cutting happened on January 1, 2018.
