= Blue Ridge Mall (North Carolina) =

Coordinates: 35.33424°N 82.44532°W

- Location: Hendersonville, North Carolina
- Opened: 1983
- Developer: Goodman Segar Hogan, Inc.
- Owner: Hull Property Group
- Num. of stores: 40
- Num. of anchor tenants: 5 (4 open, 1 vacant)
- Floor area: 350,000 square feet (33,000 m^{2})
- Floors: 1

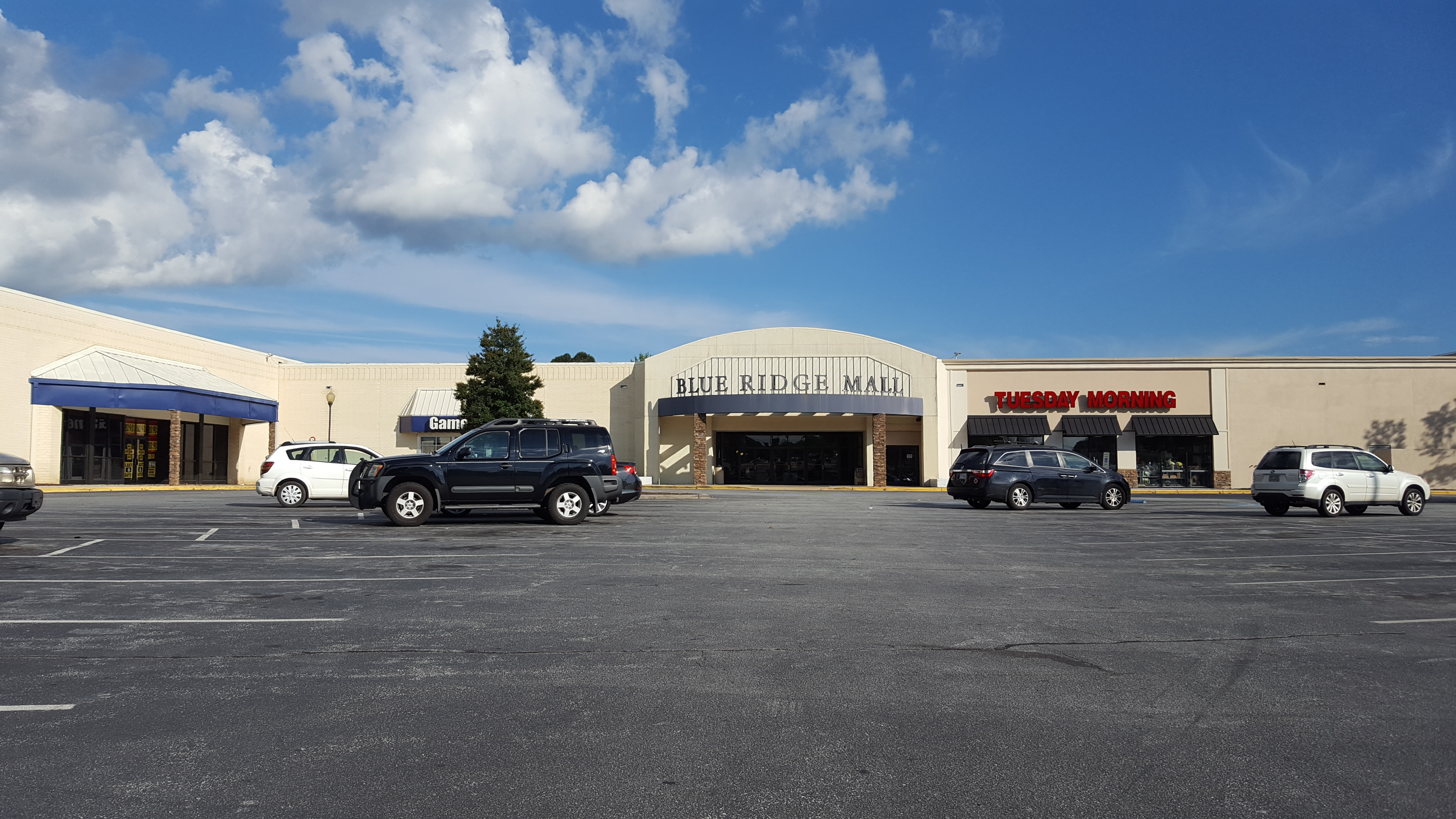
One of the mall's entrances in September 2017

Blue Ridge Mall is a shopping mall located in Hendersonville, North Carolina that opened in 1983. It is anchored by Belk and Dunham's Sports, with junior anchors TJ Maxx and Jo-Ann Fabrics, and is owned by Hull Property Group.

== History ==
The mall's groundbreaking was announced in October 1981, scheduled for November 4 that year. The mall was given a completion date of July 1983, and was to be a 350,000 sq ft center anchored by Belk, J. C. Penney, and Kmart. The first store to open was Kmart, on May 26, 1983. It was followed by the Peanut Shack and later Eckerd Drug, the latter of which opened July 25, 1983. The mall opened on July 27, 1983, with anchors Kmart, J. C. Penney, and Belk-Simpson for a total of 21 stores, which, plus two soon to open stores, put the mall at 40% occupancy.

The mall was foreclosed on in September 1991, after its owners, Blue Ridge Mall Limited Partnership, failed to make payments for two months in a row. After the sale of the mall was delayed several times, it came under the temporary ownership of the Federal Deposit Insurance Corporation, until July 1997 when it was sold to the highest bidder. The mall was sold again in 2007, from Hull Storey Retail Group to Hendon Properties, who had intentions to redevelop the property.

TJ Maxx opened at the mall on May 20, 2012. Jo-Ann Fabrics opened May 17, 2013, and Kmart closed that year. The Kmart building was demolished for Dunham's Sports in 2014. J. C. Penney closed at the mall on October 1, 2017.
