= Asheboro Mall =

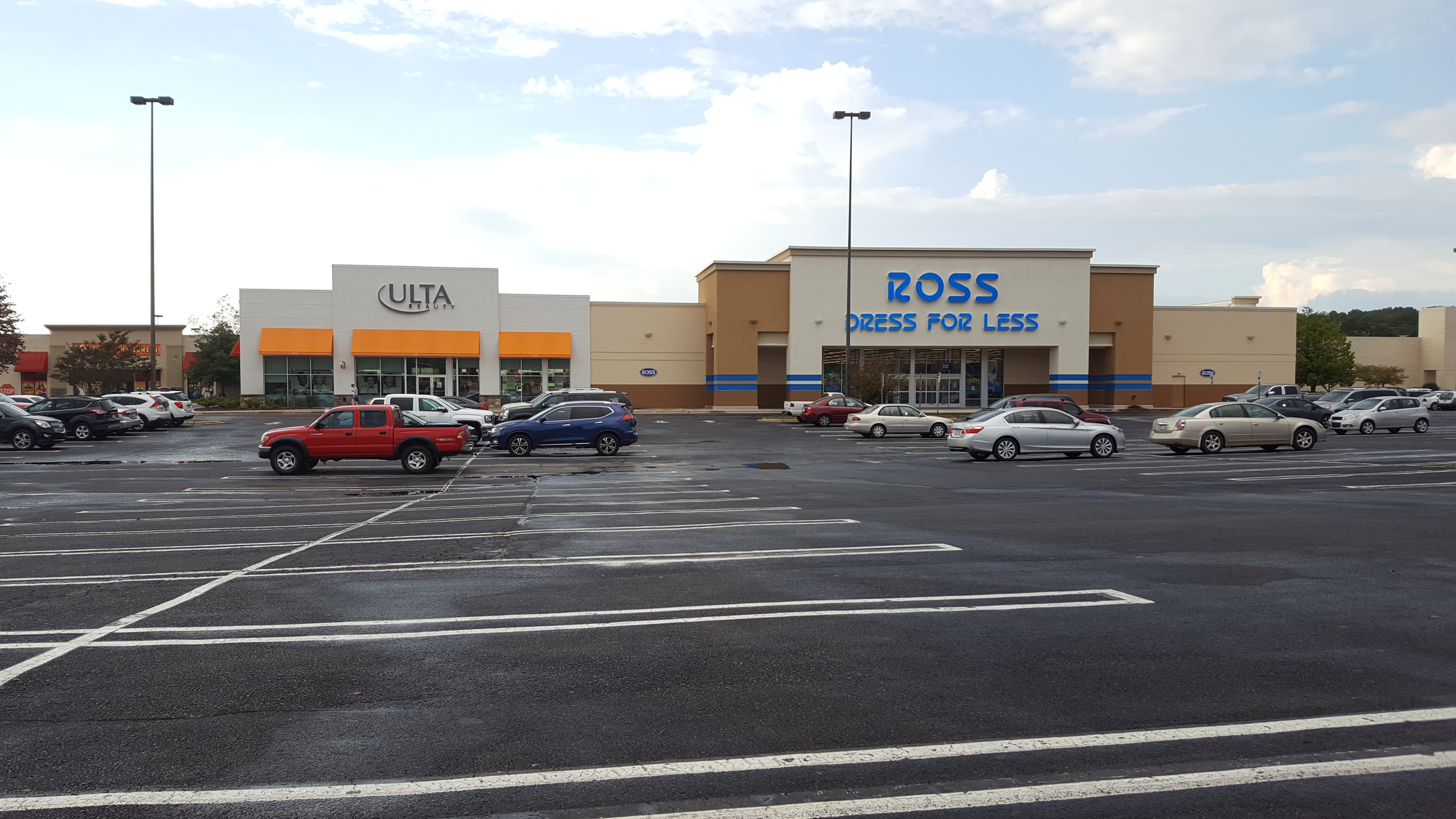
- Exterior view of Asheboro Mall, October 2017 when it was known as Randolph Mall
- Location: Asheboro, North Carolina, United States
- Coordinates: 35.70221°N 79.78696°W
- Address: 345 Randolph Mall
- Opened: 1982
- Developer: Richard E. Jacobs/David Hocker
- Owner: Hull Property Group
- Num. of stores: 50
- Num. of anchor tenants: 4
- Floor area: 379,097 square feet (35,000 m^{2})
- Floors: 1

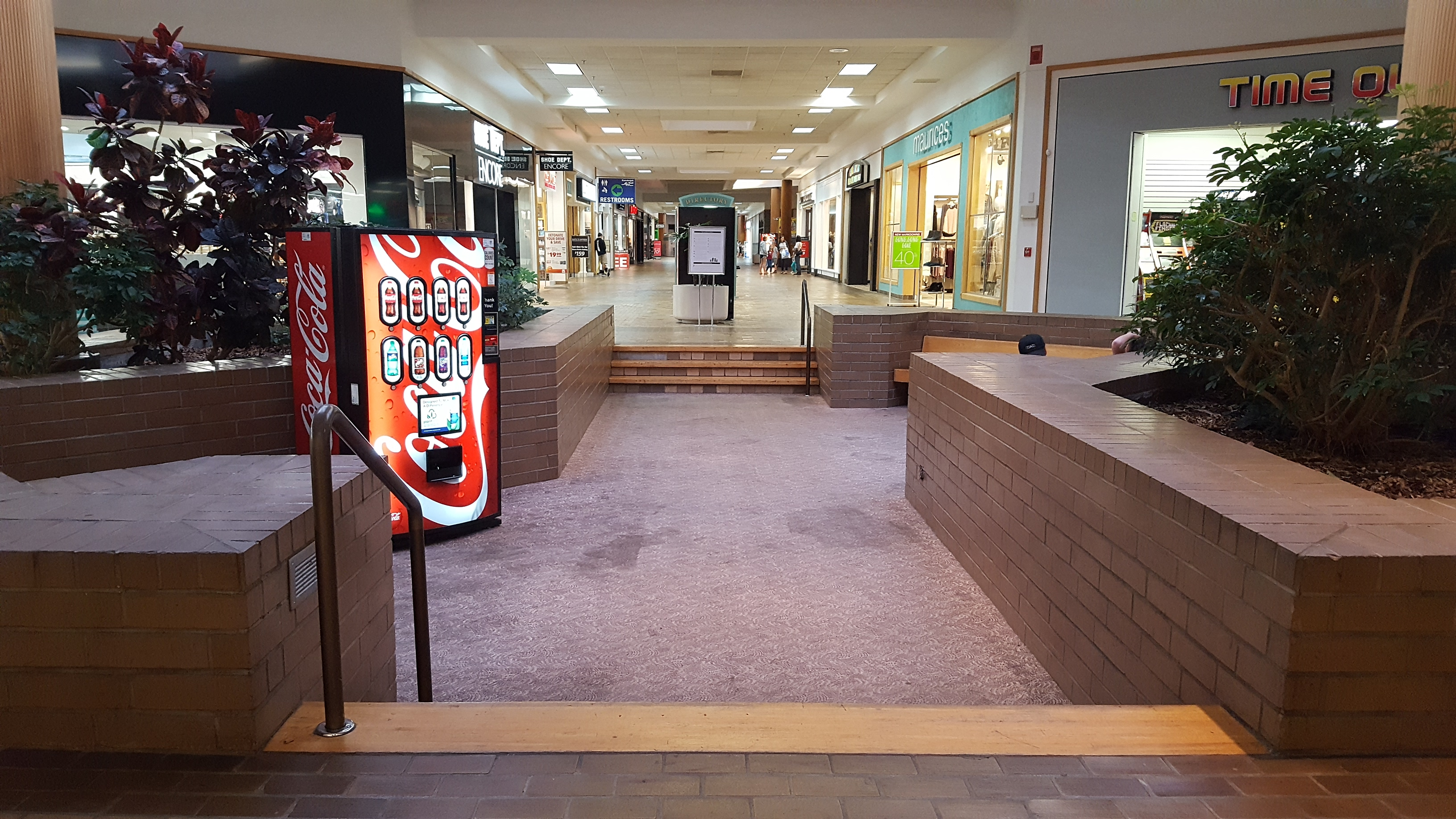
Interior view, October 2017

The Asheboro Mall (previously Randolph Mall) is an enclosed shopping mall in Asheboro, North Carolina. It features Dunham's Sports and Belk as its anchor stores. It is managed by Hull Property Group.

== History ==
Asheboro Mall opened in 1982 as Randolph Mall. Its original tenants included Woolco and Belk-Yates. Woolco later became Roses, which closed in August 2000. Also that year, Belk expanded its store.

In 2001, CBL & Associates Properties bought the mall from Richard E. Jacobs Group. The same year, Dillard's opened in the vacated Roses store. Books-A-Million opened at the mall in 2004, taking a space vacated by Eckerd Drug in 1997. In 2013, Dillard's announced that the Randolph Mall store would close. The same year, it was announced that Dunham's Sports would be replacing it.

In January 2015, it was announced that the JCPenney store would be closing as part of a plan to close 39 underperforming stores nationwide. It was later replaced by an Ulta Beauty and Ross Dress for Less. Randolph Mall was eventually sold to Hull Property Group in December 2016.

On June 6, 2017, Sears announced that its store would also be closing in September 2018 as part of a plan to close 72 stores nationwide which left Belk and Dunham's Sports as the only anchors left.

In 2020, Hull Property Group began a massive renovation project of the mall. The former Sears structure was torn down, to be replaced by a new entrance and plaza that will accommodate two outward facing stores. A new entrance near Dunham Sports was added to connect to a Cinemark theater that was recently renovated as well. Interior improvements throughout the mall include new carpeting and lighting, as well a newly designed ceiling were also included. A former PNC Bank building was also torn down and replaced with an outparcel, which will accommodate other tenants. As of April 2021, the renovations are now done and the mall has officially been renamed Asheboro Mall.
