= Pritchard Park Mall =

- Location: Racine, Wisconsin, United States
- Coordinates: 42.699230°N 87.847909°W
- Address: 5538 Durand Avenue
- Opened: August 5, 1981
- Developer: Jacobs, Visconsi, and Jacobs Company
- Owner: Hull Property Group
- Num. of stores: 110
- Num. of anchor tenants: 8 (6 open, 2 vacant)
- Floor area: 1,040,490 sq ft (96,665 m^{2})
- Floors: 1 (2 in Burlington Coat Factory)
- Public transit: Ryde Racine
- Website: shopregency-mall.com

Pritchard Park Mall (formerly Regency Mall) is an enclosed super-regional shopping mall in Racine, Wisconsin. The mall has a gross leasable area of 872,409 square feet (81,049.4 m^{2}). It features 110 retail spaces, and six anchor stores, Dunham's Sports, Bob's Discount Furniture, Planet Fitness, Ross Dress For Less, Party City, and Joann. There were two vacant anchor stores that were once Boston Store and Burlington. The fourth original anchor store structure, formerly JCPenney, has been subdivided into three in-line stores. Located at the junction of state highways 31 and 11, the building is surrounded by several freestanding stores and restaurants, including a Target store.

From 2024 to 2025, a major renovation led to a significant reduction in the total mall's area, as the old Boston Store and Burlington anchors and the eastern half of the mall were demolished and a Woodman's grocery store was built on the site, which opened in August 2025. Long-term plans reportedly include redeveloping more of the mall and adding a nearby apartment complex and car wash.

== History ==
Pritchard Park Mall was built on an eighty-acre site on the northeast corner of Durand Avenue and South Green Bay Road. The area was formerly home to an institutional farm for the Racine County Insane Asylum, which was located to the north. Federated Department Stores, then-owner of Boston Store, first proposed the shopping center in 1968. The County Board approved the construction in 1969, selling the site in 1971.

Construction on the mall was to begin in 1973, originally projected to be completed by 1975. However, the site was sold to developers Jacobs, Visconsi, and Jacobs, who received a three-year extension from the county, eventually breaking ground in the fall of 1978.

The mall opened on August 5, 1981, with two anchors: Bergner-Weise and Boston Store. Target, often considered an anchor of the mall despite being unconnected to the building, opened before it on July 26, 1981. In November, J.C. Penney became the third anchor after closing its downtown Racine store, which had operated since 1925. A Sears filled the fourth space March 1, 1982, making it the chain's third location in Racine since its downtown store had opened in 1929. A six-screen cinema opened in January 1983.

The south anchor space, originally Bergner's, was later rebranded as a Prange's in 1985. When that chain was purchased in 1992, the store was converted into a Younkers. When the Younkers closed in 2001, Boston Store, which already occupied the mall's east anchor, opened a second location in the south anchor as a home store. It opened in 2003 closed a year later. Steve & Barry's, which sold college-branded apparel, moved into the space in November 2004. Burlington Coat Factory became the tenant after Steve and Barry's moved to a smaller space in 2008.

The mall was acquired by CBL Properties, owners of over 70 malls, in 2001. Aimed at middle-income customers and being the only enclosed mall in Racine County, Pritchard Park Mall had sales of over $100 million in 2004. During that year, several retail spaces in the southwest part of the mall, including Chick-fil-A and RadioShack were combined into a single large space for Linens 'n Things. After Linens 'n Things closed, the space was repurposed for Flooring Supercenter, and later an hhgregg electronics store in 2012. The hhgregg location, which was not accessible from within the mall, closed in 2016 shortly before the chain went bankrupt. The space has been occupied by Bob's Discount Furniture since 2017.

Steve & Barry's second location was built with a similar technique in the northwest part of the mall. The newly relocated Steve & Barry's closed the same year and became The Furniture Store. Steve & Barry's second store eventually became PayHalf in 2013, which closed two years later.

The Marcus cinema, which was converted into a budget theater in 2006, was closed in July 2009. Its building has since been demolished.

Pritchard Park Mall lost two of its anchors in 2014, Sears and J.C. Penney. Several other stores, including a Hallmark store, MasterCuts, and Regis Hair Salon, also closed, and the mall's longtime manager, Curt Pruitt, left after thirty years.

On November 20, 2015, Dunham's Sports opened in the anchor space previously held by Sears. The former location of J.C. Penney was converted into three smaller spaces, which have been occupied by Ross Stores, Party City, and Jo-Ann Stores since 2016. Planet Fitness also opened around this time. In December, the Hull Property Group purchased the mall from CBL, with plans to revitalize what the company's managing owner described as a "failed mall". Boston Store closed its Pritchard Park Mall store along with all of its locations in August 2018, leaving the mall without any of its original anchors. In 2019, Burlington moved out of the mall to relocate to the former Toys R Us space across from the mall.

In 2024, Pritchard Park Mall began major renovations at an estimated cost of $120 million. The east wing of the mall, including the Boston Store and Burlington anchors, was demolished and a Woodman's grocery store was constructed on the site. The three-phase renovation will also involve the creation of a hotel and 280 apartment units, new retail space, and adding a gas station and car wash. In announcing the renovation, mayor Cory Mason described the plan as "something new and more relevant for the 21st century".
