= Columbus Place =

- Location: Columbus, Mississippi, U.S.
- Coordinates: 33.5116°N 88.4314°W
- Address: 1404 Old Aberdeen Rd.
- Opened: 1973
- Developer: Jim Wilson & Associates
- Owner: Hull Property Group
- Num. of stores: 30+
- Num. of anchor tenants: 6 (5 open, 1 vacant)
- Floor area: 319,384 square feet (29,671.7 m^{2})
- Floors: 1

Columbus Place, formerly Leigh Mall, is a shopping mall in Columbus, Mississippi, United States, constructed in 1973 and marketed by Sterling Properties. The anchor stores were Dollar Tree, Hobby Lobby, Planet Fitness, and Burke's Outlet, with a vacant anchor store that was once JCPenney. In 2019 it was purchased at auction for US$3.5 million by the Hull Property Group, which after much demolition and rebuilding renamed it Columbus Place in 2023.

== History ==
Leigh Mall was built in 1973 by Jim Wilson & Associates and sold to Equitable Real Estate in 1987. J. C. Penney and Sears were the original anchor stores.

Sears closed in 2012 and became Hobby Lobby one year later. J. C. Penney closed in 2017. The mall was sold at auction in 2019, at which point it was about 57 percent occupied.
