= The Mall at Whitney Field =

Coordinates: 42°31′48.6″N 71°44′33.3″W

Mall at Whitney Field
- Address: 100 Commercial Road; Leominster, Massachusetts
- Opened: 1967
- Developer: Kimco Realty
- Owner: Hull Property Group
- Num. of stores: 75
- Num. of anchor tenants: 4 (3 open, 1 vacant)
- Floor area: 744,107 sq ft (69,129.8 m^{2})
- Floors: 1 (closed 2nd floor in Gardner Outlet Furniture)
- Website: themallatwhitneyfield.com

The Mall at Whitney Field (formerly known as Searstown Mall) is a shopping mall located off of Route 2 near the junction with Interstate 190 in Leominster, Massachusetts. The mall opened in 1967 and was renovated and renamed in 2004. The mall's anchor stores are Burlington,and JCPenney, with one vacant anchor last occupied by Sears. The mall was previously owned by Walton Street Capital LLC of Chicago until May 2013 when Vintage Real Estate acquired the mall with plans to renovate and turnaround the struggling mall. As of January 8, 2020, the mall is now owned by Hull Property Group.

== History ==
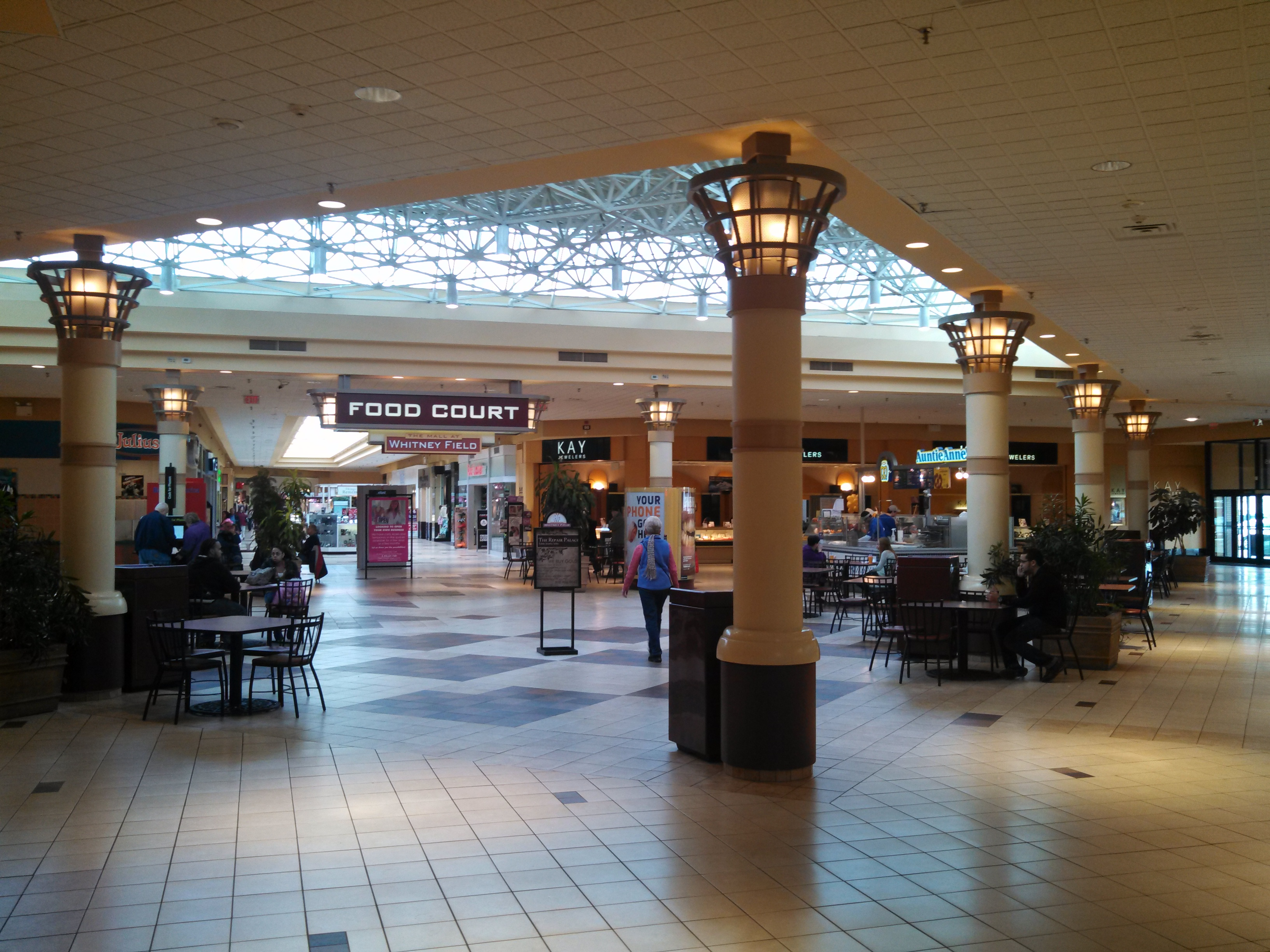
The mall's food court as of 2014

The Mall at Whitney Field opened in 1967 as the "Searstown Mall". The mall originally opened with Sears, R. H. White, and Grants City as anchors. A DeMoulas Supermarket (now known as Market Basket) was next to Grants City with an outside entrance but has since moved to an outlet nearby. The former location was eventually converted to a Toys "R" Us. In 1980, R. H. White closed its doors. The mall was expanded substantially from 1987-1988, adding a long wing created from the closed R. H. White building which led to a new JCPenney store. In 1992, Sage-Allen closed their store at the mall and was replaced by a Service Merchandise store.

In 1999, Service Merchandise closed their store and the long side wing leading to it was emptied out. The following year, the mall big-boxed the wing, turning much of it into an Old Navy store along with replacing Service Merchandise with a Circuit City store. After the departure of Bradlees in 2001, the store's former lot remained vacant until its demolition in 2002, with the former mall entrance being repurposed as an outdoor entrance. In that same year, Filene's opened a large two-level store at the mall, one entrance down from the former Bradlees store.

In an attempt to attract customers from the Interstate 495 region, the mall underwent significant renovations, renaming itself to 'The Mall at Whitney Field.' In 2007, the mall was sold for $82 million to Walton Street Capital LLC of Chicago with Jones Lang LaSalle (JLL) continuing as the mall's manager. Circuit City was later closed and replaced with Ultimate Electronics in 2010, although the chain soon went out of business the following year. Steve & Barry's became Jo-Ann Fabrics that same year.

In 2013, the mall was sold once again, this time to California-based Vintage Real Estate for an undisclosed price. Vintage Real Estate bought the center with plans to renovate and turnaround the struggling mall. They also took over management from JLL, although the firm returned to manage the mall in 2018. Immediately after Vintage Real Estate acquired the mall, they announced the signing of a ten-year lease with Burlington Coat Factory to occupy the former Circuit City space that had been vacant for years. Old Navy, which used to only have an exterior entrance, moved into a vacant space inside the mall in order to accommodate the addition of Burlington. The new store opened in 2014 and has both interior and exterior entrances.

Recent years have seen the Mall at Whitney Field struggle to attract customers. On March 14, 2018, Toys "R" Us announced that they would be closing all 800 locations in the U.S. due to bankruptcy, among them the store in Whitney Field. The store closed later that year, being replaced by Gardner Outlet Furniture on February 10, 2019. On November 7, 2019, founding anchor store Sears announced a plan to close 96 stores nationwide, shutting its doors the following February. Fellow anchor store Macy's also announced in January 2020 that it would close its store in the mall, closing April of that same year. This left Burlington and JCPenney as the only anchors left. That same June, the Chuck E. Cheese location closed permanently after 15 years of operation since 2005.

On January 8, 2020, the mall was sold once again, this time to Hull Property Group. In an attempt to revive the dying mall, renovations were made to establish the mall as a focal point of the region. In 2022, Gardner Outlet Furniture relocated into the first floor of the former Macy's space, and Launch Entertainment opened in the former Gardner Outlet Furniture space in 2023.
