= Florence Mall (Alabama) =

Shopping mall in Florence, Alabama, U.S.

- Location: Florence, Alabama, United States
- Coordinates: 34.837°N 87.635°W
- Address: 301 Cox Creek Pkwy
- Opened: 1978
- Developer: Ralph Biernbaum
- Manager: Hull Storey Gibson Companies
- Owner: Hull Storey Gibson Companies
- Num. of stores: 61+ stores, movie theater, food court
- Num. of anchor tenants: 5 (3 open, 2 vacant)
- Floor area: 637,000 sq ft (59,200 m^{2}).
- Floors: 1
- Website: shopflorencealabama.com

Florence Mall is an enclosed regional shopping mall northeast of downtown Florence, Alabama, owned by Hull Property Group. Opened in 1978 as Regency Square Mall, it was renamed in late 2013 as part of a mall-wide renovation. The anchor stores are Dillard's (formerly Castner Knott), and two Belk locations (one converted from Parisian, the other from Pizitz and McRae's). JCPenney closed in 2020 and Sears closed in 2017.

On June 4, 2020, JCPenney announced that it would close by October 2020 as part of a plan to close 154 stores nationwide. After JCPenney closed, the 2 Belk stores and Dillard's became the only remaining anchor stores.
