= Shoe Show =

American shoe store

Shoe Show Inc.
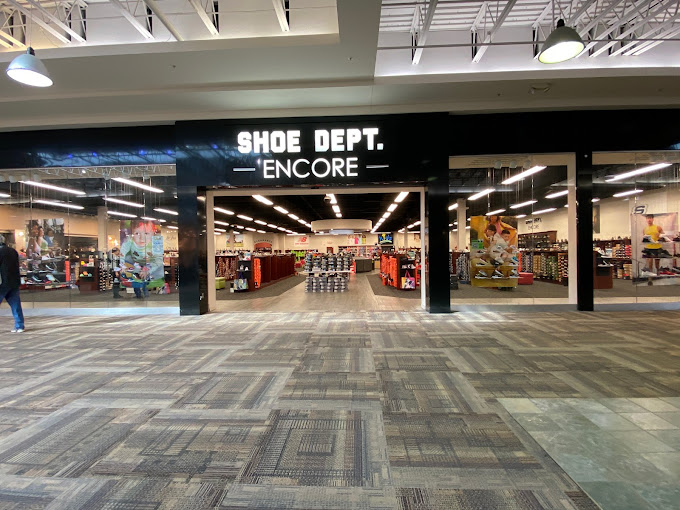
- A modern Shoe Dept. Encore store format. Opened 2013. Located inside Southern Park Mall, Boardman, Ohio.
- Company type: Private
- Industry: Retail
- Founded: 1960 (66 years ago) in Kannapolis, North Carolina, U.S.
- Founder: Robert Bright Tucker
- Headquarters: Concord, North Carolina, U.S.
- Number of locations: over 1200
- Area served: United States
- Key people: Lisa Tucker(CEO)
- Products: Footwear
- Revenue: $6.2 billion
- Divisions: The Shoe Dept. Burlington Shoes; The Shoe Dept. Encore; Shoebilee!
- Website: www.shoeshowmega.com

Shoe Show, Inc. is an American footwear retailer based in Concord, North Carolina. It operates shoe stores throughout the United States under the brands Shoe Show, Shoe Dept., Shoe Dept. Encore, Shoebilee!, Burlington Shoes, and Shoe Show Mega.

The company was founded in 1960 by Robert B. Tucker and has more than 1150 locations. It acquired Burlington Shoes in 1986, Altier Shoes in 1993, and Shoebilee! in 2002. In the early 2000s, the company began opening Shoe Dept. Encore stores, which are larger than regular Shoe Dept. stores.

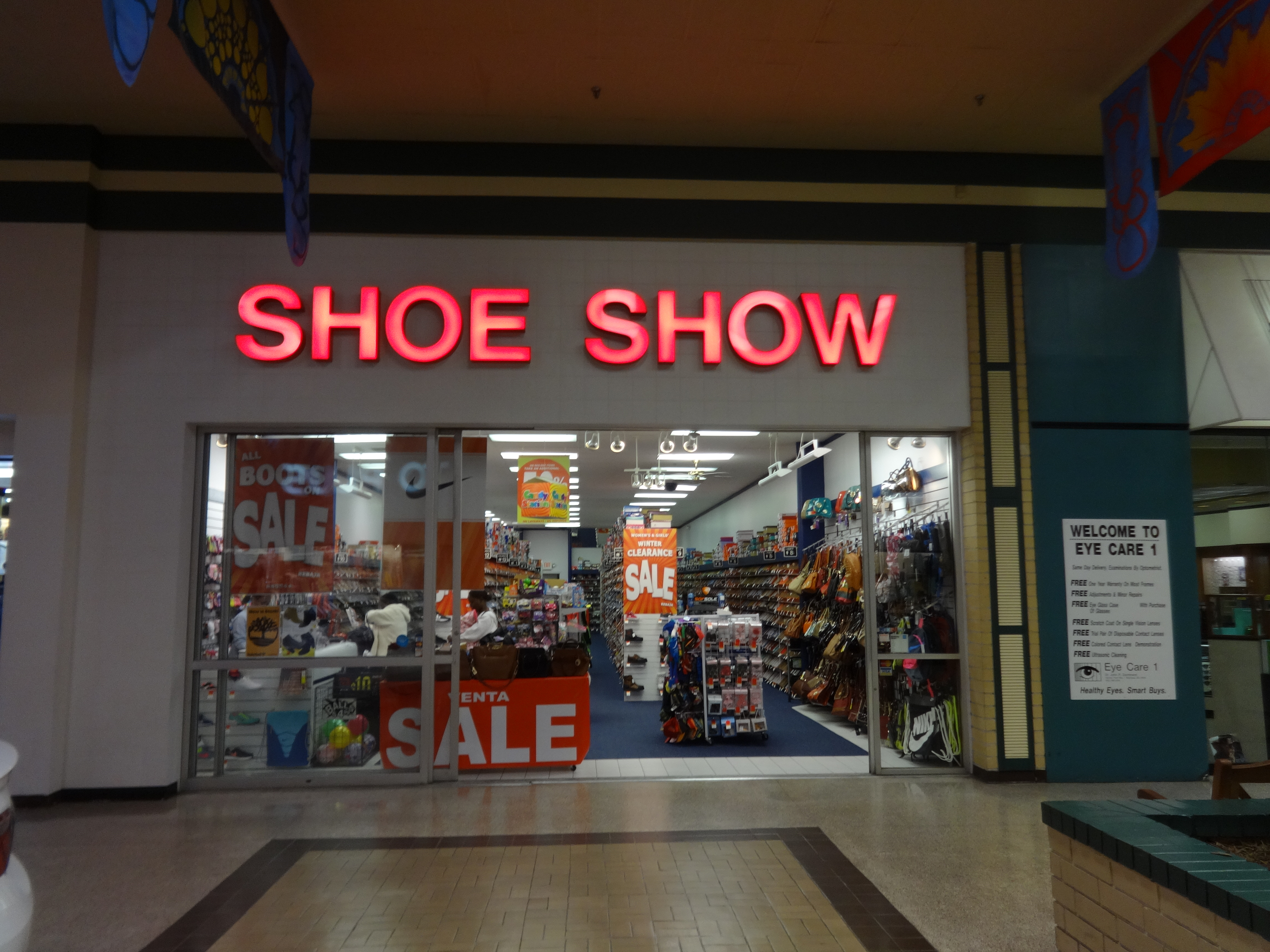
Shoe Show, Waycross, Georgia
