= Oak Hollow Mall =

- Location: High Point, North Carolina, United States
- Coordinates: 35.990707°N 80.006411°W
- Address: 921 Eastchester Drive
- Opened: August 9, 1995
- Closed: March 10, 2017
- Owner: High Point University and others
- Num. of stores: Around 10 (formerly 80+)
- Num. of anchor tenants: 4
- Floor area: 1,262,440 square feet (117,285 m^{2})
- Floors: 2
- Parking: 4,016 spaces

Oak Hollow Mall was a regional shopping mall in High Point, North Carolina, United States. It opened in 1995, and had over 80 working stores. At the time of its closing in 2017, occupancy was down to 11 stores. Most of the former mall building is owned by High Point University.

== History ==
Oak Hollow Mall opened on August 9, 1995. At nearly 1,300,000 square feet (120,000 m^{2}), Oak Hollow was the second-largest mall in Guilford County after Greensboro's Four Seasons Town Centre, and the third-largest mall in the Piedmont Triad after Winston-Salem's Hanes Mall. When Oak Hollow Mall opened, it effectively led to the demise of Westchester Mall, which had opened in 1970 on High Point's west side off Westchester Drive just south of Phillips Avenue. After its closure, Westchester Mall was converted into Providence Place which includes First Wesleyan Church and several businesses.

Oak Hollow Mall saw a decline in the 2000s as many of its interior stores began shuttering, as did its anchors. The mall lost much of its traffic to retail centers in Greensboro and Winston-Salem in addition to facing challenges from the economic downturn. The Dillard's anchor closed one of its two levels and turned the remaining open area into an outlet for the chain. Another anchor, JCPenney, closed on June 1, 2011, as it was unable to meet the company's new profitability threshold. Steve & Barry's, which was originally Goody's Family Clothing, went out of business and was replaced by a Sears call center.

On February 24, 2011, CBL & Associates announced the sale of Oak Hollow Mall to High Point University for $9 million, although CBL continued to manage the mall. The university stated that the mall was to remain open as a retail complex for the time being.

On December 27, 2011, Sears Holdings Corporation announced that Sears in Oak Hollow Mall would close sometime in 2012. Liquidation sales began in February 2012, with the final closure occurring in the last weekend of April.

Belk left Oak Hollow in 2014 for a newer store at the Palladium shopping complex, located 5 miles (8 km) away.

In January 2017, High Point University stated that it would be shutting down the mall, which at the time had 11 remaining stores, on March 10, 2017. 1924 Holdings, the limited liability company that operated the mall for the university, issued a statement that the closure of the Sears call center scheduled for the end of February rendered continued operation of the mall "unsustainable". After the closing, a community center would continue to operate in the former JCPenney space, as would the Dillard's Clearance Center, since the last remaining anchor still owned its space outright. The outer parcels, such as Target and Barnes & Noble, would also continue operation.

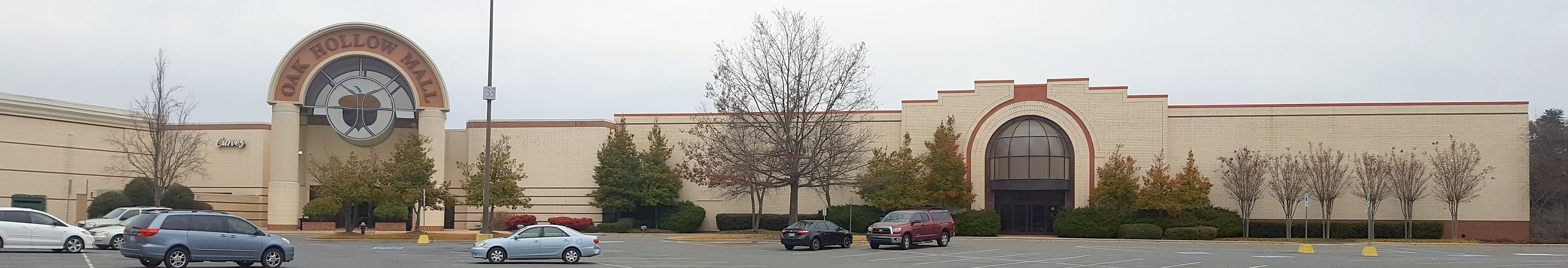
Oak Hollow Mall, December 2016

== Major stores ==
- Dillard's Clearance Center - 153,292 square feet (14,241.3 m^{2})

Outparcels

- Target, opened in 1997

== Former stores ==
- Barnes & Noble - (closed January 2020)
- Belk - 142,000 square feet (13,200 m^{2}) (closed April 2014) Relocated to Palladium shopping center
- Circuit City - 30,000 square feet (2,800 m^{2}) (closed November 2008) - Now High Point University Department of Physicians Assistant Studies
- Golden Corral - 9,700 square feet (900 m^{2}) (closed April 2012) building later demolished
- Goody's / Steve & Barry's - 35,000 square feet (3,300 m^{2}) (Goody's closed August 2005| Steve & Barry's closed December 2008) - later Sears Operations Center (Call Center) departed early 2017.
- JCPenney - 86,240 square feet (8,012 m^{2}) (closed July 2011)
- Sears - 126,000 square feet (11,700 m^{2}) (closed April 2012)
- Pier 1 Imports - 8,397 square feet (780.1 m^{2}) (closed June 2015)
- Regal Cinemas - 22,680 square feet (2,107 m^{2}) (closed October 2012)

== See also ==
- List of shopping malls in the United States
