= The Village at Sandhill =

Coordinates: 34.129°N 80.878°W

VILLAGE at Sandhill
- Village at Sandhill
- Location: Columbia, South Carolina, USA
- Opened: 2004
- Owner: Multiple
- Architect: Beame Architectural Partnership
- Num. of stores: 53
- Num. of anchor tenants: 5
- Floor area: 288,021 square feet (26,758.0 m^{2})
- Floors: 1
- Website: www.shopvas.com

Village at Sandhill is a 300-acre (1.2 km^{2}) lifestyle center located in the northeast area of Columbia, South Carolina. It is located halfway between Interstate 20 and Interstate 77 on Clemson Road at the intersection of Two Notch Road. It competes with Columbiana Centre and Columbia Place. It is the largest retail center in Columbia.

Village at Sandhill was developed by Kahn Development Company. It originally opened in late 2004 and is still currently under construction. When it opened, its first tenants were *PLEX Indoor Sports, Rhodes Furniture, World Market and Super Bi-Lo.

The open-air center offers a mix of nationally and locally owned merchants and restaurants including Starbucks and Edible Arrangements, as well as numerous national and regional banks including Wells Fargo, Regions Bank, First Citizens Bank, BB&T, and Grow Financial. The national anchors include JCPenney, which opened in 2005, The Home Depot, which opened in 2006, Belk, which opened in 2007, Sam's Club, which opened in 2016, and Burlington Coat Factory, which opened in 2018. In 2020 following the bankruptcy of Bi-Lo, this location was sold to Lowes Foods.

Village at Sandhill's latest expansion phase also includes the Promenade at Sandhill, a luxury condominium development located above retail shops, a 186-unit Discovery Village at Sandhill senior-living community and a 240-unit Nexus at Sandhill Apartments.

== Anchors ==
- Academy Sports and Outdoors
- Belk
- The Home Depot
- JCPenney
- Regal's Sandhills Cinema 16
- Lowes Foods
- Old Navy
- Rooms To Go
- Homegoods
- T.J. Maxx
- Sam's Club
- Burlington
