= Annabelle's =

American restaurant chain

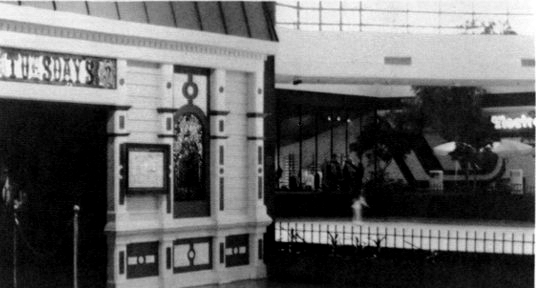
The Annabelle's (then called Tuesday's) inside Carolina Circle Mall in 1980

Annabelle's was a regional restaurant chain with 13 locations which operated in the southeast primarily in North Carolina, South Carolina and Virginia. The chain was owned by Wilmington-based H.T. Restaurants Inc. Most locations were found in malls and some were two-level structures with elaborate and ornate interior designs featuring special theme-seating.

Annabelle's began in 1973 as a single restaurant in Wilmington, NC. It was first named Tuesday's (no affiliation with Ruby Tuesday's). It was acquired by the Campbell's and renamed Annabelle's in 1983. In April 1988, Campbell decided to exit the restaurant industry and sold Annabelle's along with a sister concept, H.T. McDoogal's, for an undisclosed amount to Cavendish Capital Corporation of New York. At this time Annabelle's had 16 locations Kentucky, North Carolina, South Carolina, Tennessee and Virginia. Revenue was reported to be $19 million the prior year.

At its peak, there were 18 Annabelle's units in five states. The chain was forced into bankruptcy reorganization in 1997; as a result, all but four locations were closed. One in Petersburg, Virginia, and three in North Carolina remained open. At the time of the filing, the chain listed total assets of $5.4 million and total liabilities of $5.1 million, according to the U.S. Bankruptcy Court, Eastern Division of North Carolina.

Today there is one remaining Annabelle's location in New Bern, North Carolina. It is independently owned and has no affiliation with prior corporate ownership.

== Former locations ==
- 4106 Oleander Dr., Wilmington, NC
- Carolina Circle Mall - Greensboro, NC
- Asheville Mall - Asheville, NC
- Dutch Square - Columbia, SC
- Columbia Mall - Columbia, SC
- Eastland Mall- Charlotte, NC
- Cross Creek Mall, Fayetteville, NC
- Citadel Mall - Charleston, SC
- Hickory Ridge Mall- Memphis, TN
- Hanes Mall - Winston-Salem, NC
- Pembroke Mall - Virginia Beach, VA
- Valley Hills Mall - Hickory, NC
- Jefferson Mall - Louisville, KY
- 2733 Park Avenue - Petersburg, VA

== Current location ==
- Twin Rivers Mall - New Bern, NC Website: http://www.annabellesofnewbern.com/
