= Dutch Square =

Dutch Square Mall
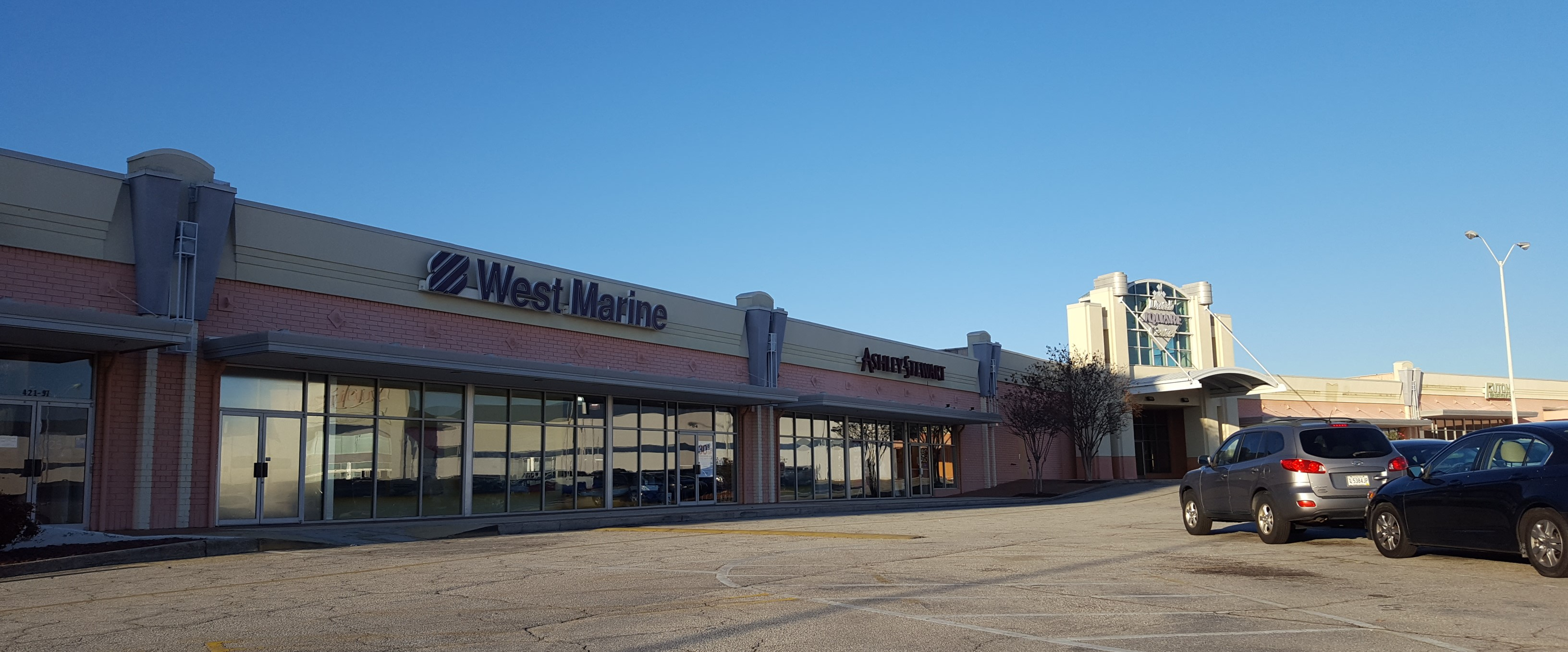
- Exterior view of Dutch Square, December 2017
- Location: Columbia, South Carolina
- Coordinates: 34.033°N 81.092°W
- Address: 421 Bush River Road
- Opened: 1970
- Developer: Caine Company
- Manager: Winbrook Management
- Owner: Nassimi Realty
- Num. of stores: 41
- Num. of anchor tenants: 3 (2 open, 1 vacant)
- Floor area: 600,000 sq ft (56,000 m^{2}).
- Floors: 1
- Parking: 2500
- Website: dutchsquare.com

Dutch Square is an enclosed shopping mall located in the northwestern part of the city of Columbia, South Carolina, near the community of St. Andrews. It features a mix of national, regional, and local retail stores and services. Its current anchor stores are Burlington Coat Factory and Office Depot.

== History ==
Dutch Square was built by Caine Company in 1970. Initial tenants of the mall included Woolco, J. B. White, and Tapp's department stores. Other major tenants of the mall included Woolworth, Eckerd Drug, and Morrison's Cafeteria.

When it opened in 1970, the mall was advertised as the "largest mall in the Carolinas". Dutch Square's management company filed for bankruptcy in 1993 after losing several anchors, but the mall experienced a revival when it was purchased by Phillips Edison in 1995.

In 1997, Columbia annexed the mall property, thus bringing the tax revenues into the city. Shortly after this event, the facility underwent a redevelopment by the owner adding 18,000 sq ft (1,700 m^{2}).

In late 2014, Belk announced it would shutter the Dutch Square location to focus on a new flagship location in the Columbia area.

In 2022, the mall's AMC location was closed, reopening as a Bow Tie Management Cinemas (BTM) the same year. The BTM would remain open until being permanently closed in 2025.

Though some of Dutch Square's current tenants including Ashley Stewart, Snipes, and Hibbett have entrances inside the mall, many of its other tenants only have exterior entrances, a characteristic of strip malls. The mall's current tenants which are not connected to the mall's interior includes Burlington, Office Depot, Dollar Tree, and Planet Fitness. In 2025, Total Wireless opened on the exterior of the mall and Chick-Fil-A relocated to the outparcel of Dutch Square.

== See also ==
- Columbiana Centre
- Columbia Place
