= Fowler's Department Store =

Fowler's department store May refer to:

- Fowler's in Alabama, now the Belk Hudson Lofts
- Fowler's in the Northeast U.S., originally Fowler, Dick & Walker
