= Koury Corporation =

American real estate development company

- Industry: Real estate
- Founded: 1952; 74 years ago
- Founder: Joseph S. Koury
- Headquarters: Greensboro, North Carolina, United States
- Key people: Richard Vanore-President Kelly Harrill-Executive Vice president(Hospitality) Mike Longmore-Senior Vice President(Commercial Real Estate)
- Products: Retail space, Office Space, Industrials, Apartments
- Services: Financial services
- Number of employees: 1,000(2024)
- Website: www.kourycorp.com

Koury Corporation is a real estate development company based in Greensboro, North Carolina. The company was founded by Joseph S. Koury in 1952.

The corporation's portfolio includes a range of properties such as apartment complexes, hotels, condominiums, shopping centers, golf courses, industrial parks, and residential communities. The company constructed Greensboro's first shopping mall, the Four Seasons Town Centre, in 1974. It also developed much of the Piedmont Triad's early residential and commercial development.

== History ==
In 1952, the company was founded by Joseph S. Koury.

In 1974, it built Greenboro's first shopping mall, the Four Seasons Town Centre. The mall was sold to GGP Inc. in 2004.

In February 2015, the company completed renovations to the Holiday Inn Greensboro Coliseum Hotel.

In March 2017, the company renovated its Grandover Resort. The company then began development of the 111-acre western portion of its Grandover development in June.

In September 2019, Richard Vanore became the president.

== See also ==
- Tamares Group
- CIM Group
- LaTerra Development
- Thor Equities
