= Carolina Circle Mall =

Former shopping mall in North Carolina, U.S.

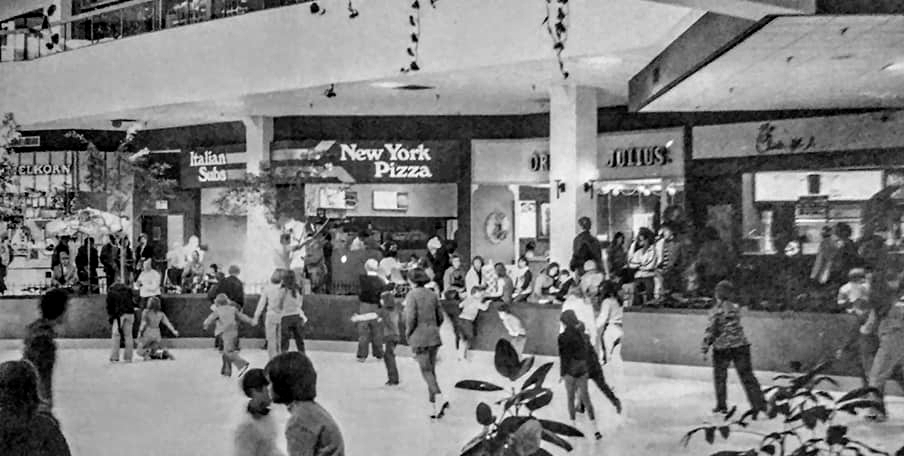
- Ice skating rink of the Carolina Circle Mall in 1978, with various restaurants in background
- Location: Greensboro, North Carolina, U.S.
- Coordinates: 36.1093°N 79.7549°W
- Opened: February, 1976
- Closed: 2002
- Developer: Alpert Investment Corp.
- Num. of stores: 70+
- Num. of anchor tenants: 3
- Floor area: 800,000 sq ft (74,000 m^{2})
- Floors: 2

Carolina Circle Mall was a shopping mall in the northeast section of Greensboro, North Carolina on US 29 and Cone Boulevard.

== History ==
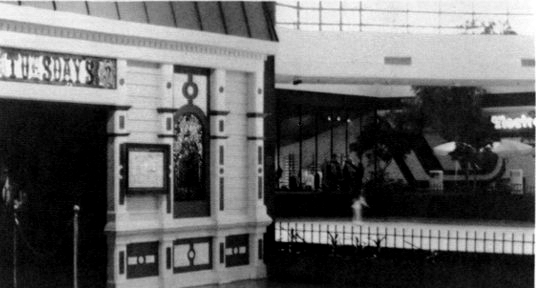
Inside Carolina Circle Mall in 1980, showing Annabelle's (then called Tuesday's) on the left

Carolina Circle Mall opened in 1976, two years after the opening of Four Seasons Mall in southern Greensboro. Carolina Circle Mall was anchored by Belk, Ivey's and Montgomery Ward. Belk opened its doors in February 1976, and Montgomery Ward's, Ivey's and twenty-two other stores opened in August of that year. It was Ivey's first department store in Greensboro. The mall encompassed 800,000 sq ft (74,000 m^{2}).

Carolina Circle Mall also featured the only ice skating rink in Greensboro, located in the central corridor of the mall. The mall also had a movie theater and out-parcel stores such as Toys R Us and a Kmart across Cone Boulevard. Another major tenant was a Piccadilly Cafeteria and a restaurant and bar called Annabelle's. The mall continued to enjoy success and friendly competition with Four Seasons and other retail establishments in town throughout the late 1970s and early 1980s.

In the late 1980s, Carolina Circle Mall's vacancy rate rose when Four Seasons was expanded. To keep up, Carolina Circle Mall was renovated. A food court replaced the ice rink in 1988.

== Decline ==
By 1990, Carolina Circle Mall was clearly in decline. A skateboarding park adjacent to the mall drew complaints, as incidents such as drug use increased around the mall's property.

A growing number of gangs combined with rising crime in the area kept shoppers away from Carolina Circle Mall. The vacancy rate increased throughout the 1990s. Mainstays such as Waldenbooks, Camelot Music and Radio Shack left the mall. Belk downsized its department store, leasing the lower level to the U.S. Post Office. By 1998, Belk and Dillard's (formerly Ivey's) closed their doors, with Dillard's having previously downgraded to a clearance center. This left Montgomery Ward as the sole anchor and only a handful of inline tenants left. By 2002, with Montgomery Ward in bankruptcy, the closure of that chain signaled the closure of the entire mall.

== Post-closure ==
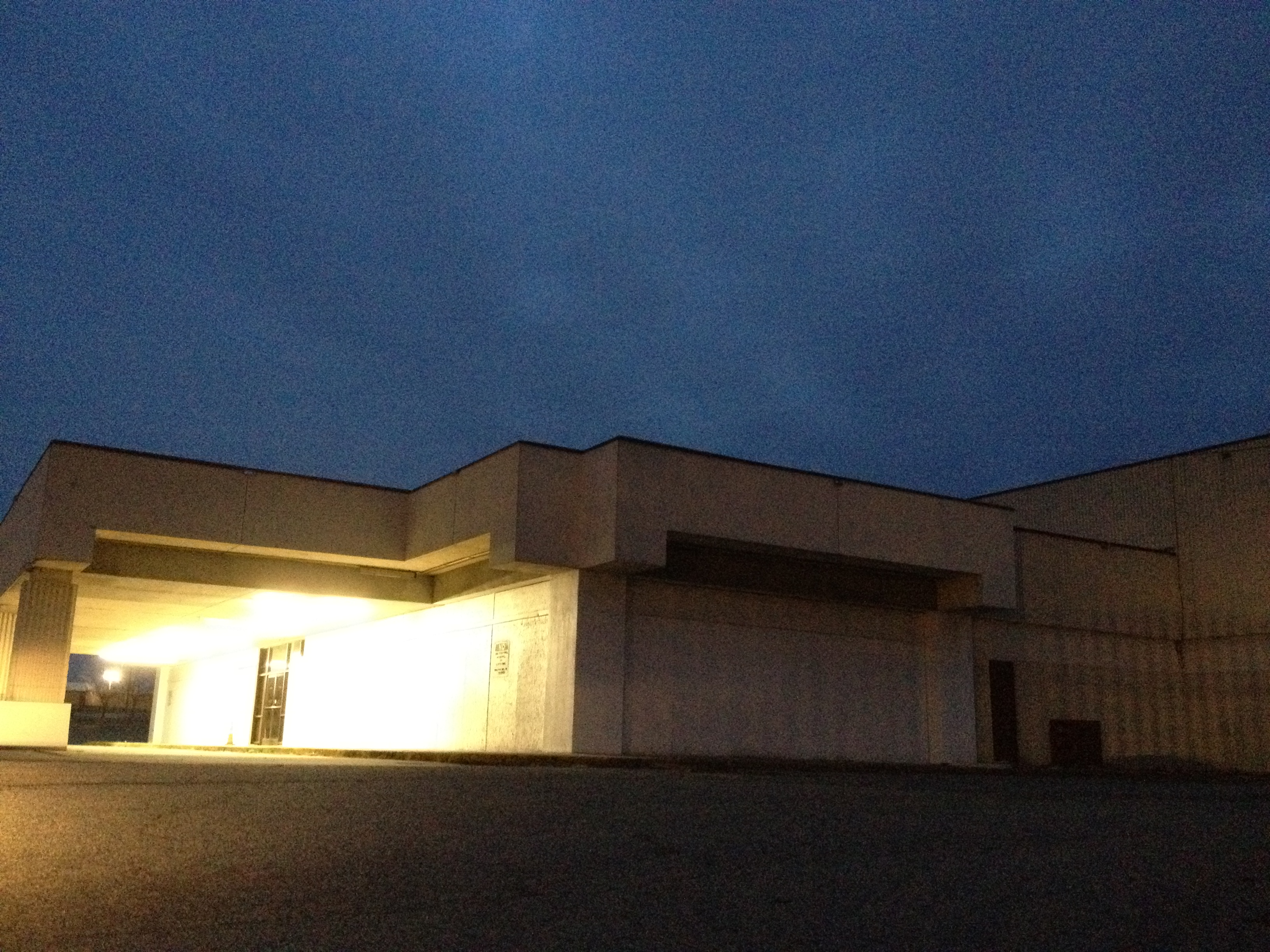
Vacant Montgomery Wards Auto Center structure in 2012

After the mall closed in 2002, there were many ideas thrown around as to what it should become. Government offices, a branch of Guilford Technical Community College, and a sports complex and indoor fitness facility were some of the ideas that were pitched. Linder Investments purchased the property, and turned some of the parking lots into soccer fields, however the mall structure itself remained vacant and boarded up after constant vandalism.

By June 1, 2005, Walmart had purchased part of the property; further, demolition began on Carolina Circle Mall. By 2006, Walmart opened with a strip of new stores. Part of the Ring Road was removed. A Lowe's store replaced the Kmart across Carolina Circle Mall in 2007.
