= Belk Hudson Lofts =

- Fowler's Department Store
- U.S. National Register of Historic Places
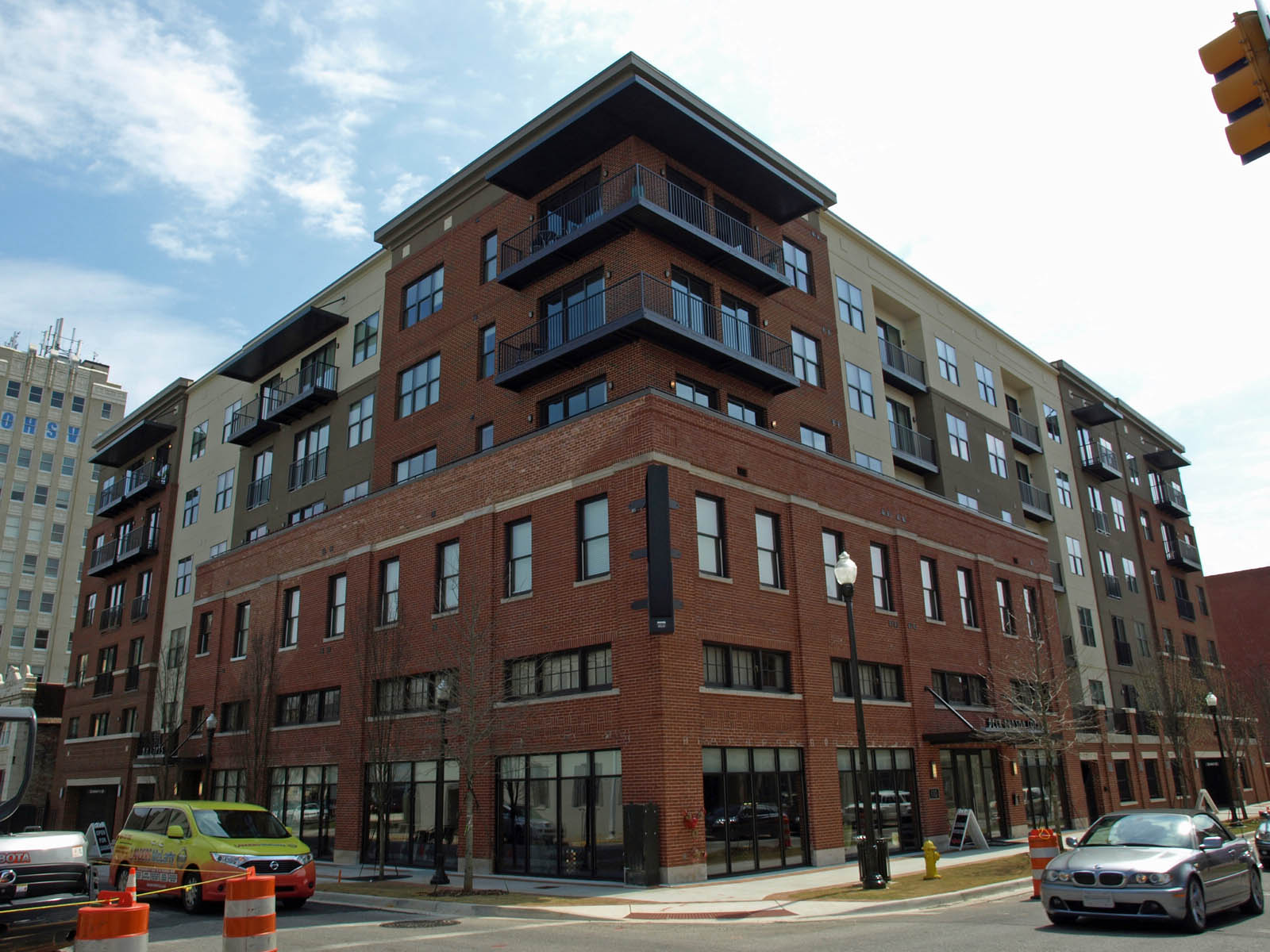
- The building in March 2013

- Location within Huntsville, Alabama Location within Alabama Location within the United States
- Location: 116 Washington and 214 Holmes Sts., Huntsville, Alabama
- Coordinates: 34°43′57″N 86°35′8″W
- Area: less than one acre
- Built: 1930
- Built by: Dan Brandon (mason of 1936 portion)
- Architect: John C. Lowe Sr. (designer of 1936 portion)
- Architectural style: Early Commercial
- MPS: Downtown Huntsville MRA
- NRHP reference No.: 96000597
- Added to NRHP: May 30, 1996

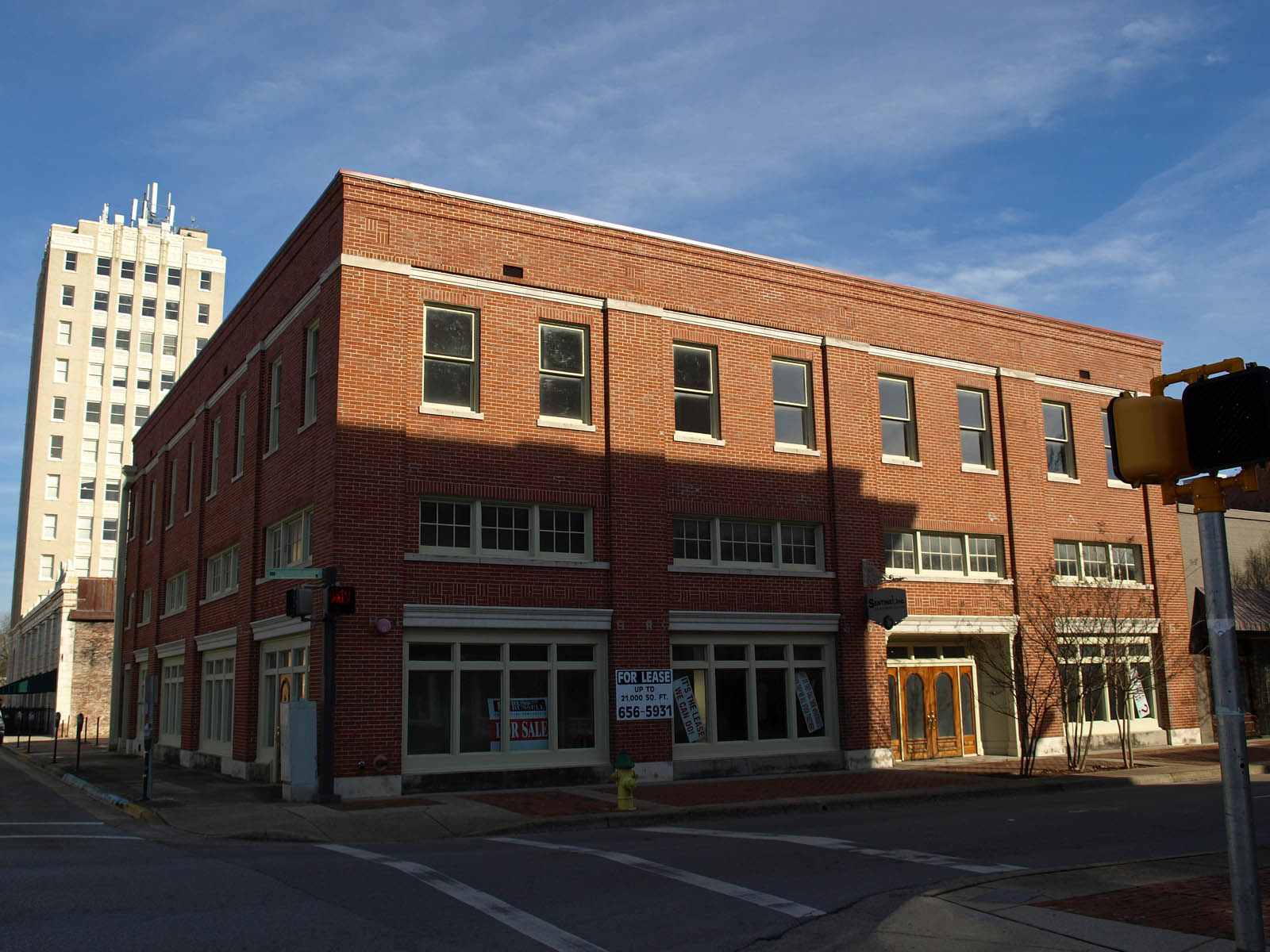
In 2009, before the reconstruction

Belk Hudson Lofts (also known as Fowler's Department Store or the Lowe-Kilgore Building) is an apartment building in Huntsville, Alabama. Originally two buildings, the first was built on the corner of Washington Street and Holmes Avenue in 1930 to house Fowler's Department Store, one of several department stores on Washington Street (including Dunnavant's and Kress). The second building, adjacent to the first along Holmes, was constructed in 1936 as a farm supply store. Fowler's went bankrupt in 1938, and Belk Husdon purchased the corner building in 1940. Beginning in 1944, they also leased the Holmes building, and the two were joined. After Belk Husdon left the downtown area, the building was renovated into offices in the 1980s. The one-story Holmes building was occupied by Olde Towne Brewing Company from 2004 until 2007, when the building was destroyed by fire. In the 2010s, the corner building was reconstructed into a loft apartment building, with the original façade kept largely intact.

The building was listed on the National Register of Historic Places in 1996.
