= Terrance Brennan =

American restaurateur

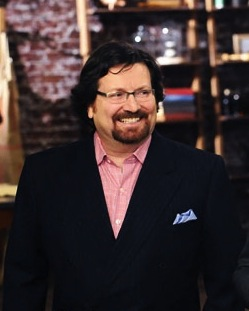
TerranceBrennanPicture

Terrance Brennan is the Chef-Proprietor of the restaurants of The Artisanal Group, including Picholine and Artisanal Fromagerie, Bistro & Wine Bar and Bar Artisanal.

== Early life and career ==
The son of Annandale, Virginia restaurateurs, Brennan began cooking at the age of 13 and rose steadily through the ranks of America's most renowned and imaginative chefs. Following positions at several Washington, D.C. restaurants and hotels, Brennan served as a saucier at Le Cirque under Alain Sailhac and worked in many of Europe's greatest kitchens including Taillevent, Le Tour d'Argent, Moulin de Mougin, Gualtiero Marchesi, Les Crayeres and La Gavroche. Brennan's signature culinary style took form while working under Chef Roger Vergé at Le Moulin de Mougins in the south of France. Inspired by the region's "cuisine of the sun," Brennan returned to New York City and refined his art as Chef at Annabelle's, the Hotel Westbury's Polo restaurant, and Prix Fixe. In 1993, Brennan opened his first restaurant, Picholine, which he named after the petite green olives indigenous to the Mediterranean coast. The restaurant quickly earned three stars from The New York Times, and four stars from New York Magazine, and received the Zagat Survey's Highest Overall Ratings distinction from 1997 - to the present, and is a perennial award winner for its 600-plus wine selections. The restaurant received a James Beard Foundation nomination for the country's Outstanding Restaurant in 2007, and was awarded two stars in the 2008 - 2011 editions of Michelin Guide New York City. Picholine closed in 2015.

== TV appearances ==
A popular celebrity guest chef, Terrance has appeared on the NBC Today Show, PBS, The Food Network, Martha Stewart Living Television, Anthony Bourdain: No Reservations, Beat Bobby Flay, CBS Morning News, CBS The Early Show and Live with Regis and Kelly.
