= Mall at Barnes Crossing =

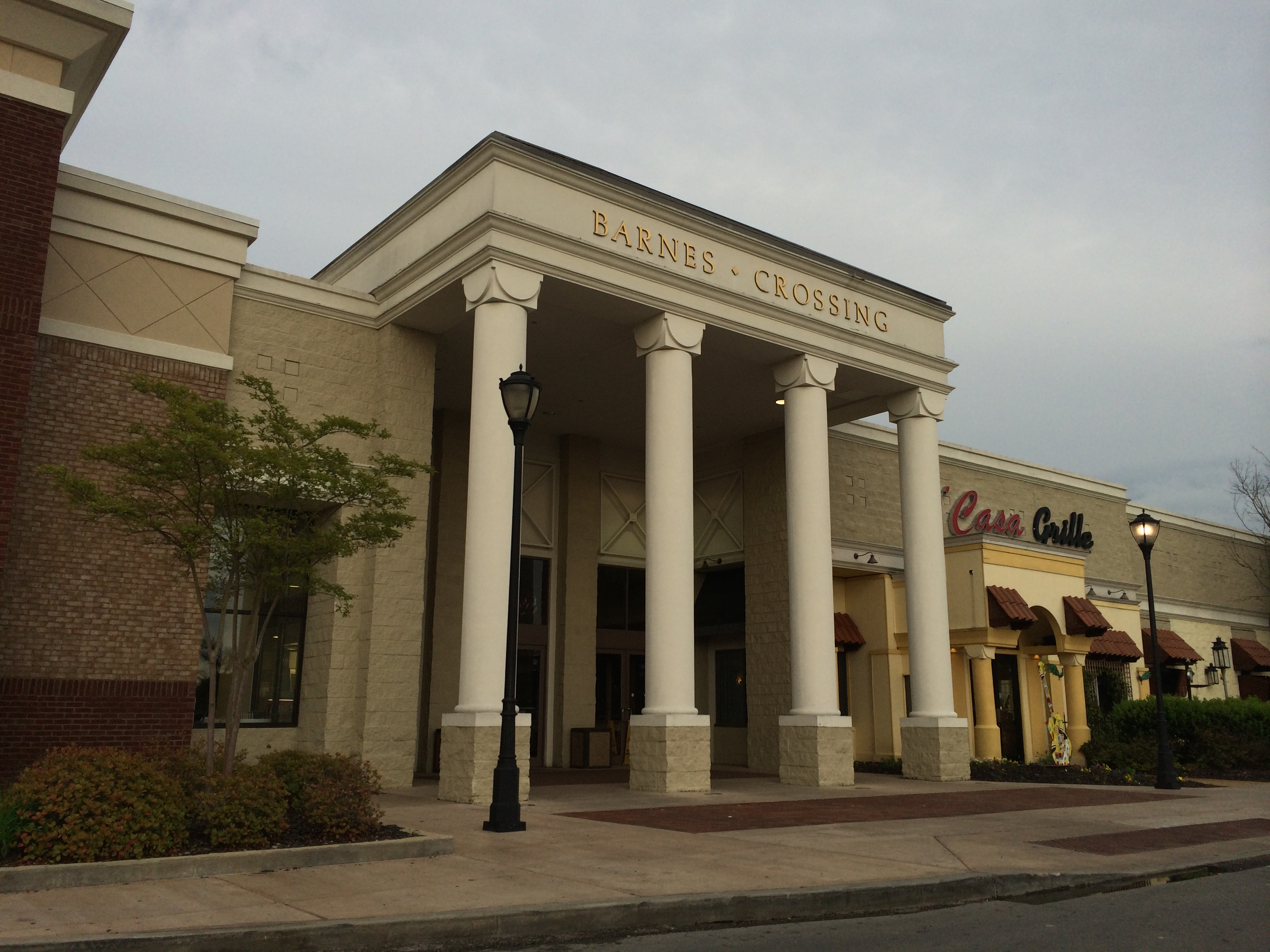
- Entrance to Barnes Crossing Mall, April 2015
- Location: Tupelo, Mississippi, United States
- Coordinates: 34.30796°N 88.70175°W
- Opened: March 7, 1990; 36 years ago
- Developer: David Hocker & Associates and R.F. Coffin Enterprises
- Manager: JLL Properties
- Owner: JLL Properties
- Num. of stores: 90+
- Num. of anchor tenants: 9 (8 open, 1 vacant)
- Floor area: 833,000 ft^{2} (77,400 m^{2})
- Floors: 1
- Website: barnescrossing.com

The Mall at Barnes Crossing is a super regional shopping mall located in Tupelo, Mississippi, United States. It is managed and partially owned by David Hocker & Associates and is home to over 90 specialty shops, 5 anchor store tenants, an 8-screen Cinemark movie theater, and a 600-seat food court. The anchor stores are Barnes & Noble, Jos. A. Bank, JCPenney, Ulta Beauty, 2 Belk stores, Cinemark, and Dick's Sporting Goods. There is 1 vacant anchor store that was once Sears.

== History ==
Mall at Barnes Crossing opened March 7, 1990 as the third mall in the Tupelo area. Original anchor stores included Kmart, Belk, and McRae's, along with JCPenney and Sears. Kmart closed in 1996 and was sold to McRae's, which moved its men's clothing and home goods into the former Kmart while retaining women's clothing, children's apparel, and cosmetics at the existing store. Belk later closed and became Parisian, but returned to the mall in 2005 when it acquired both McRae's locations.

Belk also acquired the Parisian chain in 2007, and as a result, the former Parisian at the mall was then closed and became Dick's Sporting Goods in 2008. In 2008, Barnes & Noble opened and added an additional 10,000 sq ft (930 m^{2}) to the mall making the official size 821,000 sq ft (76,300 m^{2}). Joining them in an updated lifestyle center look were, Coldwater Creek. The southwest entrance also has been remodeled and it the home of ULTA Beauty and D'Casa Mexican Restaurant.

The Mall at Barnes Crossing is considered a safe place for community shoppers and visitors. There have been no known instances of alarm involving shoppers. However, in the early 1990s, a disgruntled ex-employee broke into the mall and assaulted several workers, sending at least one to the North Mississippi Medical Center Hospital (NMMC). Little is known about this event, though local news agencies (WTVA, WCBI) and local newspapers (The Daily Journal) covered the story.

On November 8, 2018, it was announced that Sears will be closing this location as part of a plan to close 40 stores nationwide. The store closed in February 2019. June 2025 the mall went into foreclosure by Brookfield Properties but it was picked up in an auction.

Jones Lang LaSalle (JLL) acquired the mall in the summer of 2025.

== Periphery ==
David Hocker & Associates also manages an outdoor strip shopping center called Market Center to the west of the mall, between two major entrances. The center consists of anchors Old Navy and Shoe Carnival. Another outdoor strip shopping center called Barnes Crossing Plaza lies north of the mall, including anchors OfficeMax, TJ Maxx, and Hobby Lobby, and Ollie's Bargain Outlet.
