= Columbia Place =

Coordinates: 34.065899°N 80.961637°W

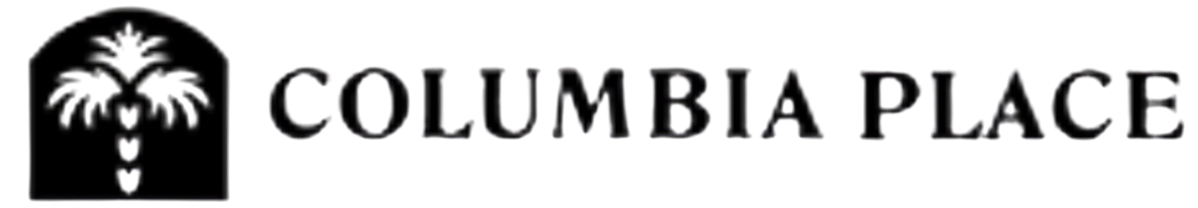

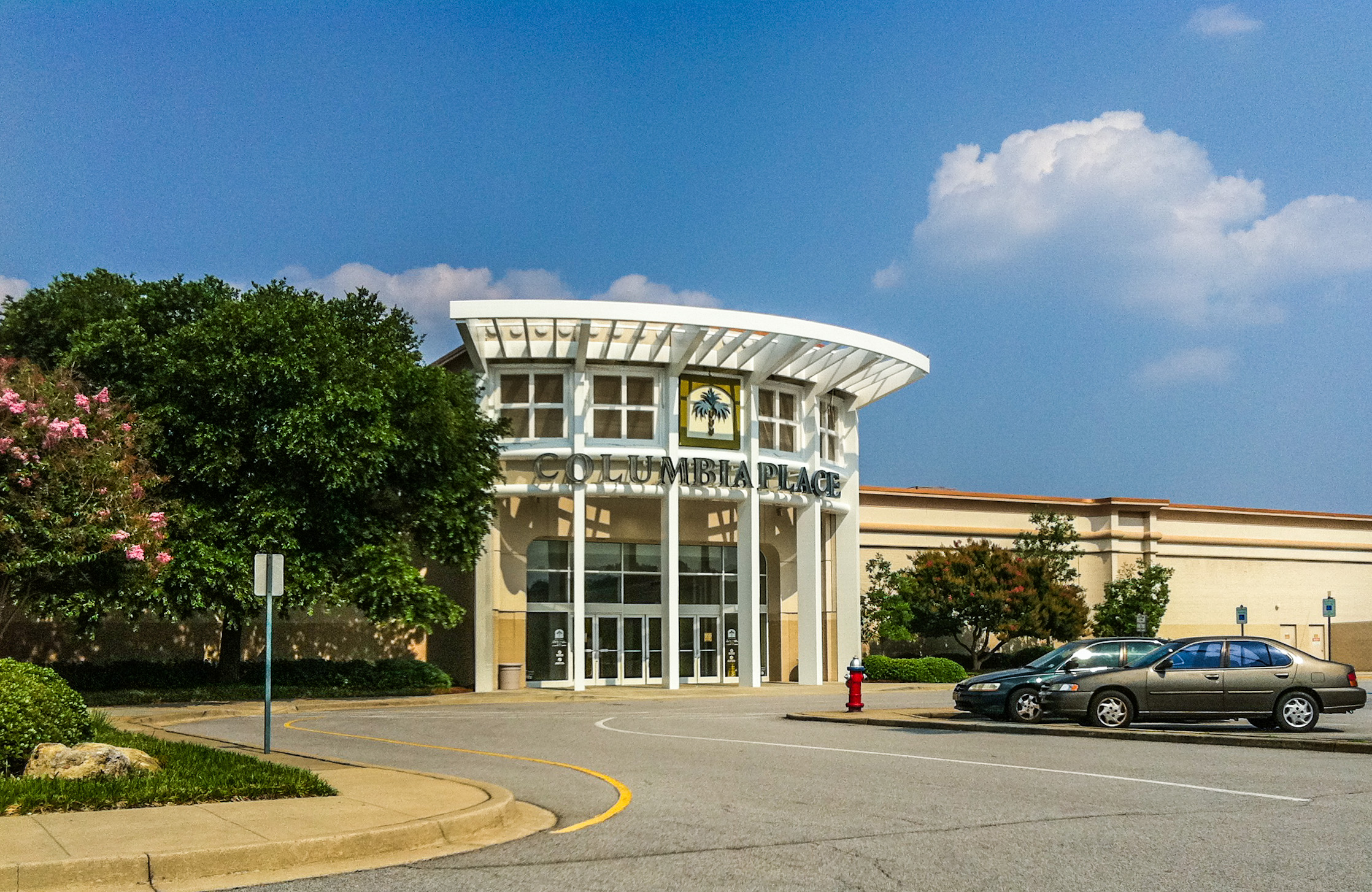
- Columbia Place entrance, June 2011
- Location: Columbia, South Carolina, United States
- Opened: August 10, 1977
- Developer: Jacobs, Visconi & Jacobs Company
- Owner: Moonbeam Capital Investments
- Num. of stores: 100+ (about 50 open)
- Num. of anchor tenants: 5 (1 open, 4 vacant)
- Floor area: 1,098,401 sq ft (102,044.8 m^{2}) (GLA)
- Floors: 2
- Parking: 6,149 spaces
- Website: shopcolumbiaplace.com

Columbia Place (formerly Columbia Mall) is one of South Carolina's largest shopping malls, with nearly 1,100,000 square feet (100,000 m^{2}) of retail space. The mall is located just off Interstate 20 and Interstate 77 on Two Notch Road in the northeast part of Columbia, South Carolina, in between Arcadia Lakes and Dentsville. The mall's current only anchor store is Macy's.

== Stores ==
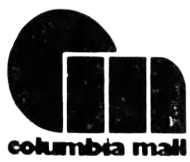
Columbia Mall logo from 1977

Columbia Mall opened in 1977, anchored by Belk and Sears. Rich's and JCPenney opened a few months later. Dillard's replaced Belk in 1995 and closed on November 4, 2008. JCPenney left the mall for a new lifestyle center, Village at Sandhill, located 10 miles (16 km) away in 2007. Sears closed in September 2017. Burlington closed on February 16, 2018. Macy's, the mall's sole remaining anchor, is the only Macy's location in more than a 50-mile radius.

The two-level mall added an 8 unit food court in 1997 and received its first renovation in 2002.

The road that loops the mall's parking lot is known as Columbia Mall Boulevard and is the address for many outlying businesses as well as a campus of Southeastern College (formerly Virginia College).

== Ownership ==
Columbia Place was built by Kahn Development Company and the Richard E. Jacobs Group and was purchased by CBL & Associates Properties in 2001. For a period of time the mall was leased and managed by Spinoso Real Estate Group of North Syracuse, New York after being lost by owner CBL & Associates Properties in a foreclosure action. CBL & Associates Properties also lost their former Citadel Mall property in Charleston, South Carolina in 2013 after foreclosure.

On October 31, 2014, Las Vegas real estate investor, Moonbeam Capital Investments acquired Columbia Place Mall.
