= Independence Mall (North Carolina) =

Shopping mall in North Carolina

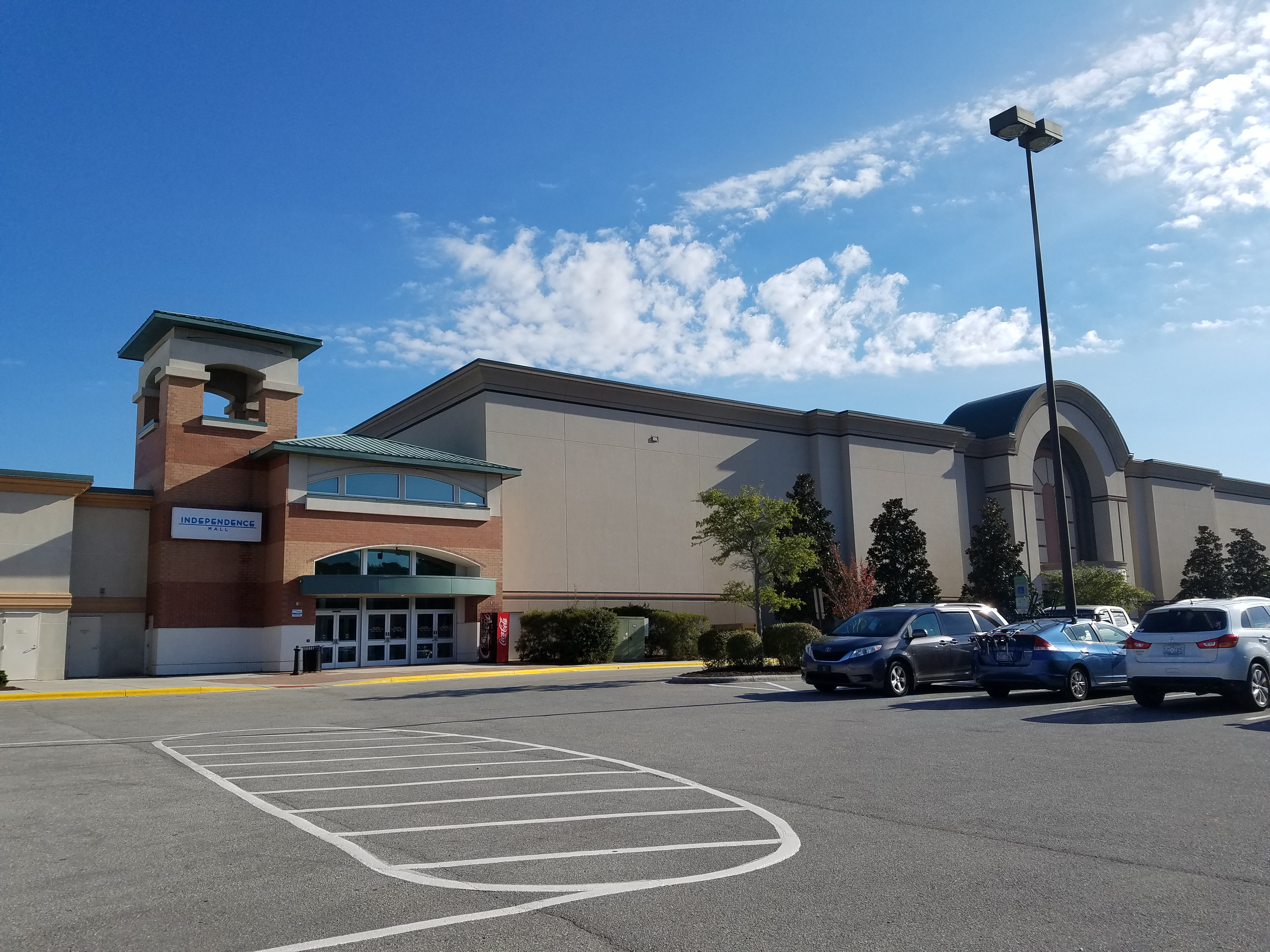
- Location: Wilmington, North Carolina, U.S.
- Coordinates: 34.21334°N 77.9061°W
- Address: 3500 Oleander Drive; Wilmington, North Carolina; 28403
- Opened: 1979
- Developer: Strouse, Greenberg & Co. The Oleander Co.
- Manager: 4th Dimension Properties
- Owner: 4th Dimension Properties
- Num. of stores: 144
- Num. of anchor tenants: 6
- Floor area: 997,525 square feet (92,673.1 m^{2})(GLA)
- Floors: 1 (2 in Belk, Dillard's and former Sears)
- Website: www.shopindependencemall.com

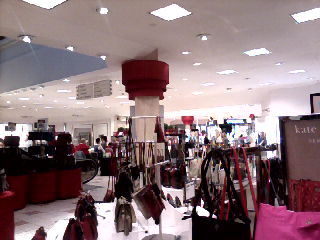
The Middle of Belk at Independence Mall

Independence Mall (formerly Westfield Shoppingtown Independence Mall or Westfield Independence Mall) is the only enclosed shopping mall in Wilmington, North Carolina. It opened in 1979 with anchor stores Belk-Beery (now Belk), JCPenney, and Sears. A later expansion added a new wing and Dillard's store to the center after Westfield Group purchased the mall. The mall is located on Oleander Drive (U.S. 76) and Independence Blvd east of downtown Wilmington. The mall has a food court and formerly featured a carousel.

== History ==
Independence Mall was developed by a partnership between Philadelphia-based Strouse, Greenberg & Co. and Wilmington-based The Oleander Co. It opened in 1979 with anchor stores Belk-Beery (now Belk), JCPenney, and Sears. A notable feature of the mall was the mosaic murals depicting Wilmington landmarks and landscapes, designed by artist and retired savings-and-loan executive Samuel D. Bissette.

=== New owners and expansion ===
In 1997, the mall was sold to Westfield America, Inc., a precursor to Westfield Group, Westfield's management would oversee a major expansion, which would add a fourth arm to the mall, anchored by a new Dillard's store and including a 400-seat food court. The name of the mall was changed to Westfield Shoppingtown Independence Mall in 1998. In 2005, the Shoppingtown name was dropped, however the signs still had the Shoppingtown name in it.

In 2000, Independence Mall Cinemas, a three-screen theater complex operated by Carmike Cinemas, which opened in 1979, was demolished to make way for the new Dillard's wing, which the new store opened on March 16, 2001, while the new wing opened on March 21, 2001.

On May 9, 2006, Westfield sold the mall to Centro Properties Group, which its joint venture subsidiary Centro Watt (now Brixmor Property Group) managed the property, and the name of the mall returned to Independence Mall.

In 2012, It was announced that the carousel in the center court would be removed after eight years of operation. The same year, Madison Marquette was hired to manage the mall, that lasted until the sale in 2017.

=== Financial issues and redevelopment ===
In October 2014, a $110 million loan on Independence Mall went into default after payments were overdue for more than a month. As of July 2016, a foreclosure auction date had been set for later that month, however the date has continuously been moved in efforts to continue discussions with the loan borrower, Centro Independence LLC. A property appraisal done in December 2015 valued the mall at only $61 million.

On June 27, 2017, Rouse Properties (now part of Brookfield Properties) purchased the mall for $45 million and announced the redevelopment of the mall into a modern open-air shopping center and change the mall's name to The Collection at Independence.

On April 6, 2018, it was announced that Sears would be closing as part of a plan to close 24 stores nationwide. The store closed in June 2018.

In August 2019, the final plans for the redevelopment of the mall has been approved by the city of Wilmington, and shortly after, the remaining tenants at the former Sears wing have been relocated to the 3 remaining anchor wings, and as a result, the Sears space along with a nearby mall entrance that also used to house Ruby Tuesday, Leland-based San Felipe Mexican Restaurant, and Nikki's Sushi (relocating to Dillard's wing), has been blocked off to make way for the demolition and redevelopment. The current name of the mall will be retained.

On October 2, 2020, Five Below held their grand opening in part of the former Sears space.

On October 14, 2020, sporting goods retailer, Dick's Sporting Goods announced they would also be opening their brand-new store in part of the former Sears property on October 17, 2020. Relocating from its existing nearby location in College Rd that used to be occupied by Best Products until its liquidation in 1997.

On August 5th, 2025, 4th Dimension Properties acquired the mall from Brookfield Properties, with the company's principal officer Felix Reznick stating that "the mall will continue to evolve where families shop and dine, friends gather, and the community comes together".
