= Friendly Center =

Shopping mall in North Carolina, US

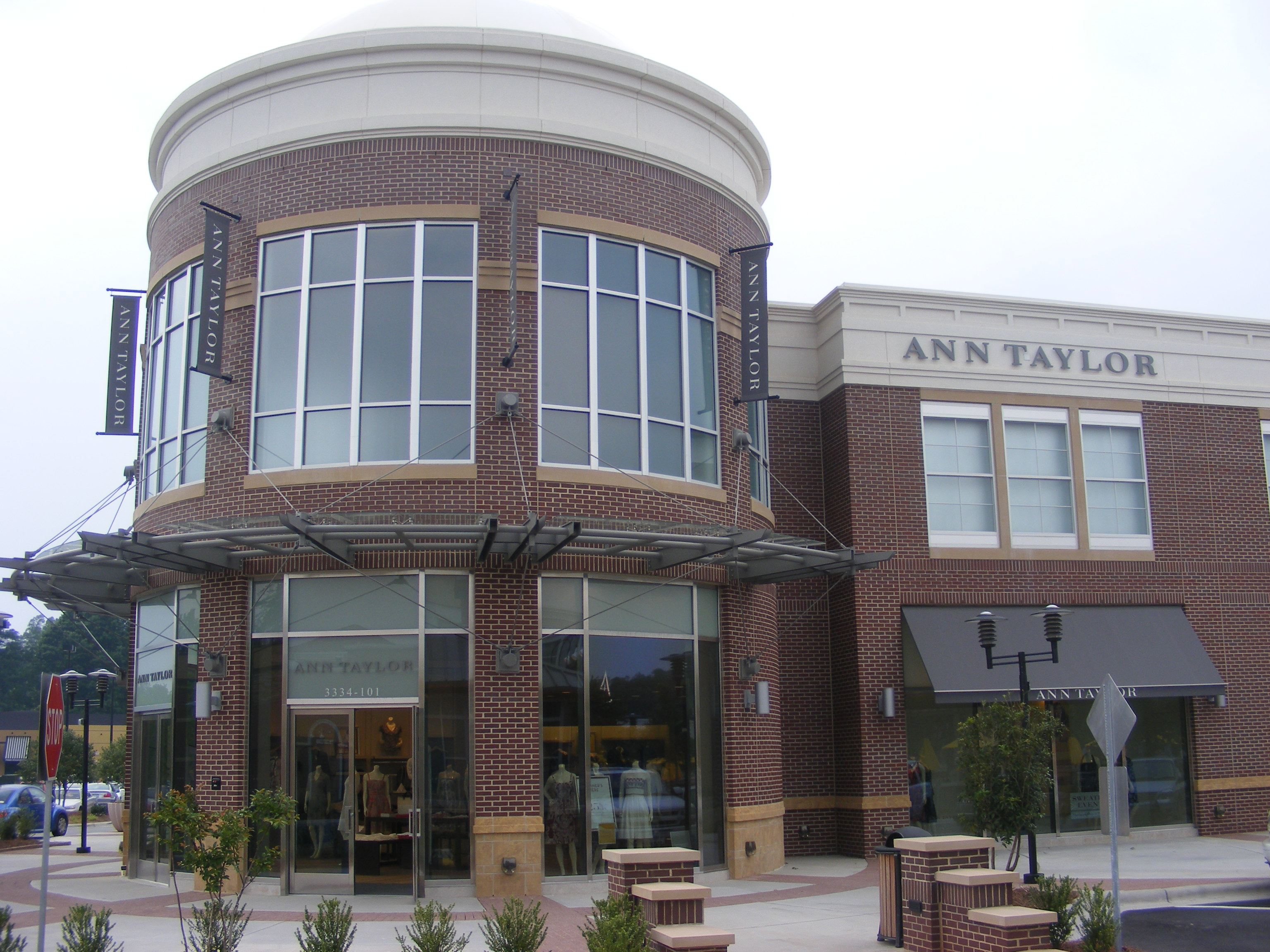
- Location: Greensboro, North Carolina, United States
- Coordinates: 36.0859°N 79.8323°W
- Opened: August 1957; 69 years ago
- Manager: CBL Properties
- Owner: CBL Properties
- Num. of stores: 140
- Num. of anchor tenants: 6
- Floor area: 1,237,000
- Floors: 1-2
- Parking: Parking by storefronts throughout the center, subdivided by crosswalks
- Website: friendlycenter.com

Friendly Center is a large, open-air mall located in northwestern Greensboro, North Carolina, near the interchange of Wendover Avenue and Friendly Avenue.

The anchor stores at Friendly Center are Belk, Macy's and Harris Teeter.

== History ==
The shopping center opened in August 1957, and with its inward orientation, Friendly Center could be classified as an outdoor lifestyle center. Its anchor tenants include Belk, Macy's (formerly Thalhimer's, later Hecht's), and Sears. Other tenants include Barnes & Noble and Old Navy, The Grande Theatre is a 16-screen multiplex cinema operated by Regal Cinemas. It also contains Harris Teeter's flagship supermarket location encompassing 72,000 square feet (6,700 m^{2}) and Whole Foods Market.

In early 2006, construction of "The Shops at Friendly Center" began after the nearby Burlington Industries office building was demolished. Its opening on October 19, 2006, introduced retail shops that had not previously been present in the Piedmont Triad market such as an Apple Store, Brooks Brothers, REI, J. Crew, Coldwater Creek (closed in 2014), White House Black Market, Pendleton, J. Jill, and Johnston & Murphy. Several chain restaurants located in the center, including P.F. Chang's, Fleming's Prime Steak House and Wine Bar, Bravo Cucina Italiana, and Mimi's Cafe. On November 8, 2006, a 72,000-square-foot (6,700 m^{2}) Harris Teeter supermarket opened as the chain's largest in North Carolina.

On April 3, 2007, Starmount Company put Friendly Center up for sale along with most of their other commercial real estate. On October 5, 2007, CBL & Associates contracted to buy Friendly Center and all of Starmount Company's retail and office holdings. On January 4, 2008, The Triad Business Journal reported that CBL & Associates paid more than $200 million for Friendly Center and the Shops at Friendly Center.

On April 13, 2023, it was announced that Sears would be closing its location in summer 2023. Until this announcement it was the last Sears store in North Carolina.
