= Four Seasons Town Centre =

Shopping mall in North Carolina, US

Coordinates: 36.0401966°N 79.8373775°W

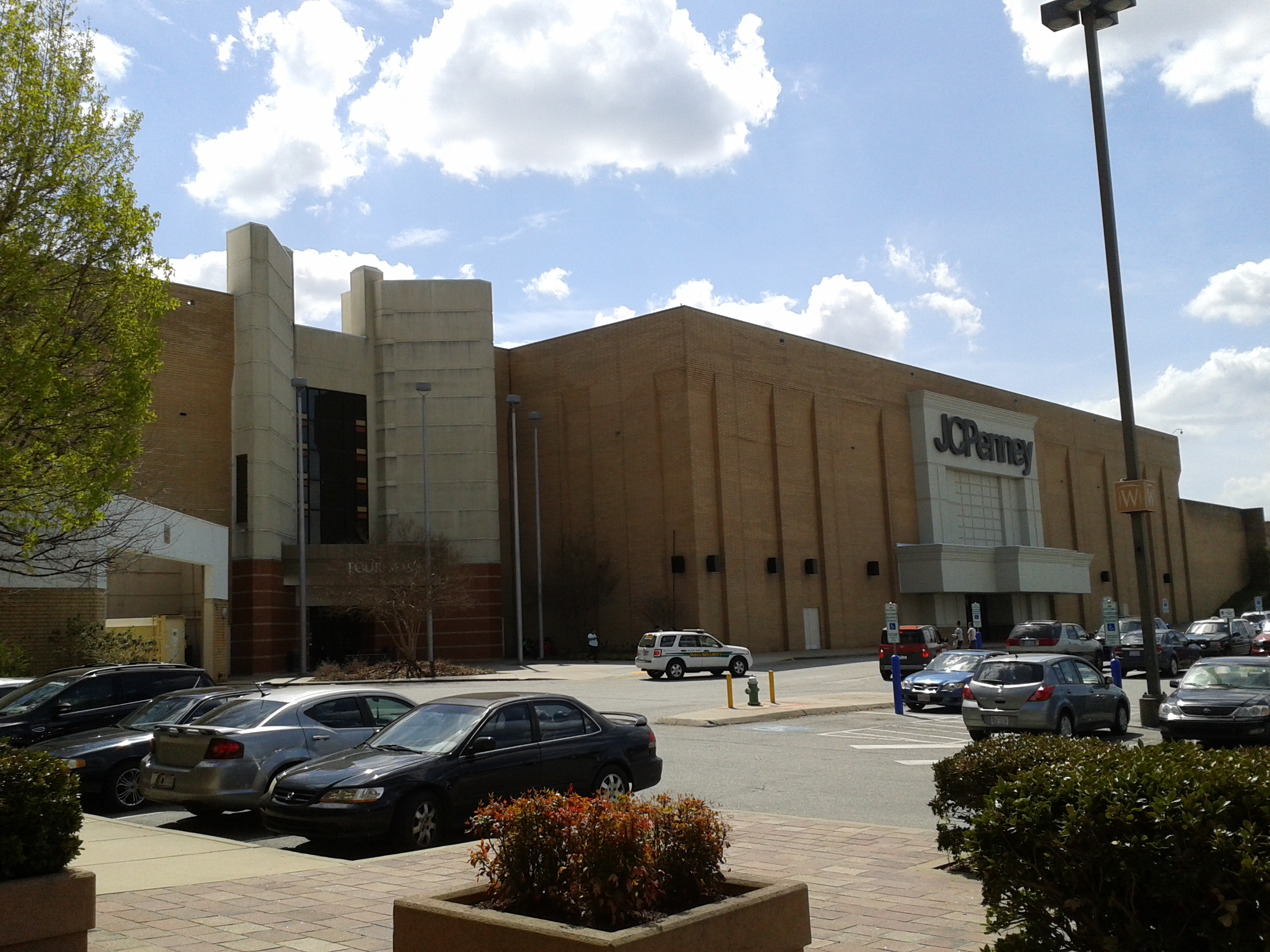
- Exterior of Four Seasons Town Centre, April, 2015
- Location: Greensboro, North Carolina, United States
- Opened: 1974
- Developer: Imperial Construction (Koury Corporation)
- Manager: GGP
- Owner: GGP
- Num. of stores: 141
- Num. of anchor tenants: 3
- Floor area: 1,084,337 sq ft (100,700 m^{2}) GLA
- Floors: 3 (2 in JCPenney)
- Parking: Circumnavigatable parking lot with 5,500 spaces
- Website: shopfourseasons.com

Four Seasons Town Centre is a three-story shopping mall in Greensboro, North Carolina. Opened in 1974, it was the first enclosed shopping center in Greensboro. Currently it is anchored by Dillard's and JCPenney and it is the only indoor shopping mall within Greensboro's city limits; however, nearby Friendly Center, an outdoor shopping plaza, has many of the same tenants. It is managed by GGP, a subsidiary of Brookfield Properties. The shopping mall is located off I-40, via the Gate City Boulevard and Koury Boulevard exits, southwest of downtown.

== History ==
The process of acquiring the land for what would later become the site of Four Seasons Mall commenced in late 1958. Joseph S. Koury, a local developer, initiated the purchase of land south of downtown Greensboro with the vision of creating new suburban housing and shopping centers. The specific site for Four Seasons, situated at the newly established junction of Interstate 40 and US 29-A/US 70-A (present-day Gate City Boulevard), was designated for the flagship development of Imperial Corporation. Imperial Corporation served as the precursor to Koury Corporation, both owned and operated by Joseph S. Koury.

The initial development on the site saw the inauguration of a Holiday Inn hotel in 1970. Subsequently, the mall took shape, featuring two levels and encompassing 900,000 square feet (84,000 m2) of Gross Leasable Area (GLA), unfolding in phased openings. JCPenney commenced operations on August 7, 1974, while a significant portion of the mall's interior debuted on October 30, 1974. Belk joined the lineup, officially opening its doors on February 6, 1975, coinciding with the property's formal dedication ceremony. The mall was designed for future expansion, with a main building that featured both a third floor and a basement level, both earmarked for future retail space.

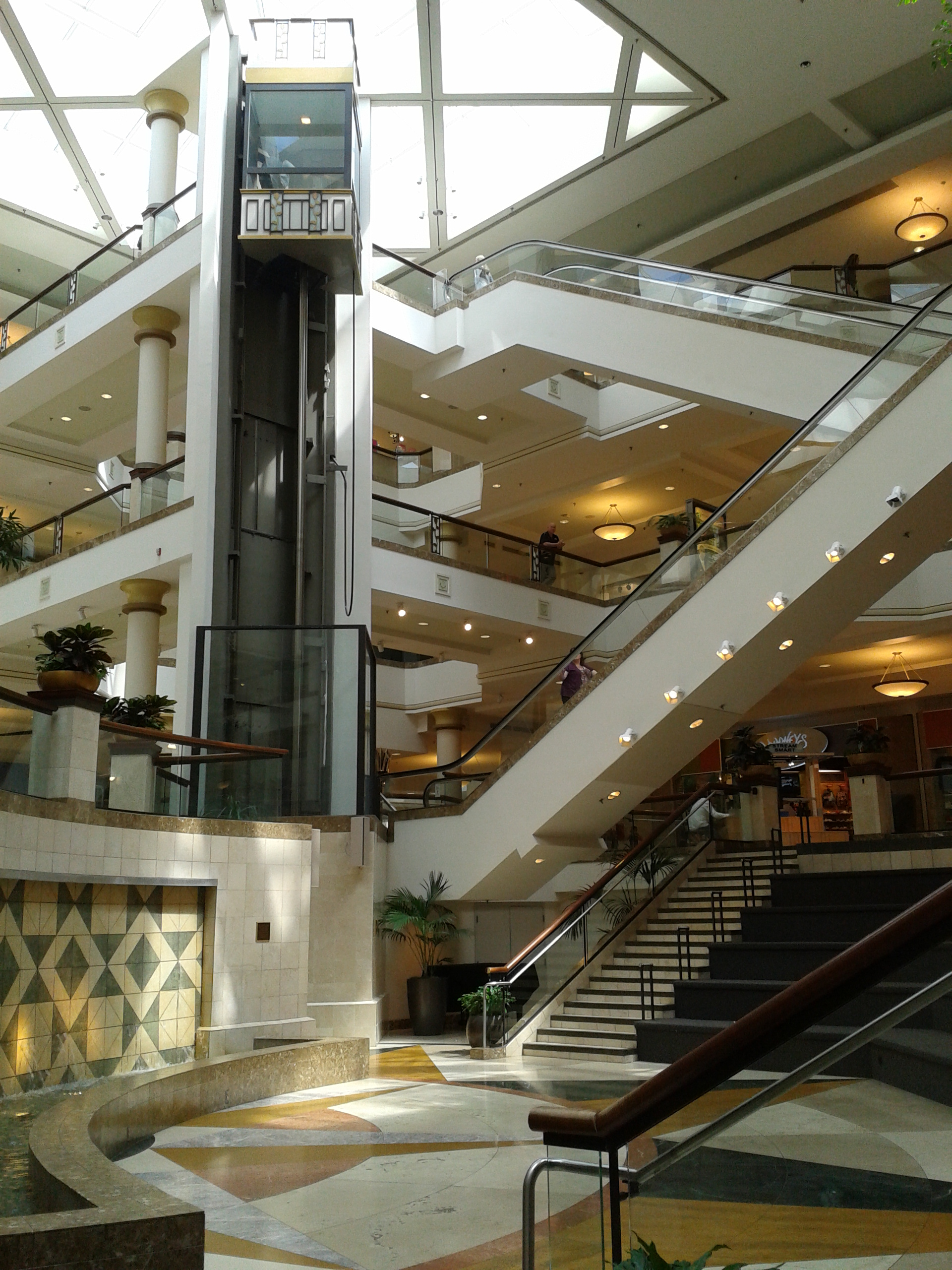
Interior of the mall, seen from the indoor amphitheatre on the first floor

Initially named Four Seasons Mall, the shopping center showcased Belk, JCPenney, and Meyer's, a Greensboro-based department store owned by Allied Stores, as the primary anchor tenants. Secondary anchors included Miller & Rhoads, Frankenberger's, Thalhimers, and McCrory's. Additionally, Four Seasons featured sizable Eckerd Drugs and Winn Dixie stores, along with a Piccadilly Cafeteria. The entertainment offerings were complemented by a four-screen General Cinema, which debuted in 1979.

Meyer's was later succeeded by Jordan Marsh, another Allied Stores brand, and eventually, the space was sold to Ivey's by 1980. In 1983, JCPenney ceased its auto service operation at Four Seasons, and the standalone building housing it was demolished in the following years.

In 1987, Four Seasons Mall completed its third story expansion, giving the mall over 1 million square feet (93,000 m^{2}) of GLA, 200 stores and a large new food court. It also assumed its current name at that time, along with a new, more contemporary logo.

Ivey's underwent acquisition by Dillard's in 1990, occurring just after a significant renovation of its store that linked it to the mall's newly constructed third level. The mall opened several small stores in the basement level (later a bookstore) and bragged in commercials of "four floors of stores." In the same year, Thalhimers was sold to the May Department Stores Company. Meanwhile, Belk underwent a substantial expansion and renovation, introducing a third shopping level and incorporating over 50,000 square feet (5,000 m2) of additional selling space.

In 1992, when the Thalhimers nameplate was phased out, the Four Seasons store shuttered due to its limited size (20,000 square feet or 2,000 m2), which was deemed unsuitable for a comprehensive department store. Although the May Company initially planned to replace the store with a Hecht's, it ultimately opted to expand its Friendly Center Hecht's location and construct a standalone Hecht's three miles (5 km) west of Four Seasons at the intersection of Interstate 40 and Wendover Avenue.

When Interstate 40 was being rebuilt between 1993 and 2008; this included the exit to Koury Boulevard, giving westbound traffic access. The Gate City Boulevard (then High Point Road) junction was rebuilt, in the form of the parclo interchange.

During the late 1990s, Four Seasons Town Centre underwent an extensive interior renovation featuring a striking redesign by Thompson, Ventulett, Stainback & Associates. The updated design introduced a spacious fountain and amphitheater to the mall's center court. Additionally, permanent vendor spaces and kiosks were incorporated into the expansive corridors, accompanied by inviting living room-style soft seating areas.

In 2002, Dillard's embarked on a comprehensive expansion, adding 80,000 square feet (7,000 m2) to its store and initiating a complete renovation. Simultaneously, a three-year process saw the redesign of all exterior public mall entrances.

During the early 2000s, the closure and subsequent demolition of Carolina Circle Mall resulted in Four Seasons becoming the sole remaining enclosed shopping mall in Greensboro.

In 2004, the mall was sold to General Growth Properties (now Brookfield Properties).

On May 19, 2014, Belk made an announcement that its Four Seasons location would cease operations in February 2015. In a formal statement, Belk officials explained their decision, stating a desire to "focus our resources and efforts on the major expansion and remodeling of our Friendly Center store, which we will reopen this fall as a Belk flagship store." Following the initiation of a store closing sale on November 8, 2014, the Four Seasons store permanently closed its doors on January 18, 2015, just before its 40th anniversary at the mall.

On April 25, 2016, local news sources reported Dillard's intention to relocate to the former Belk location. The new Dillard's store officially opened on October 25 of the same year. Prior to the move, a clearance center was briefly operated in the old location to liquidate excess merchandise.

In January 2018, Round1 Bowling & Amusement, a Japanese entertainment company, opened a location on the first floor of the former Dillard's. This marked Round1's 20th entertainment center in the United States, located in Greensboro.

== See also ==
- Carolina Circle Mall
- Friendly Center
