= Valley Hills Mall =

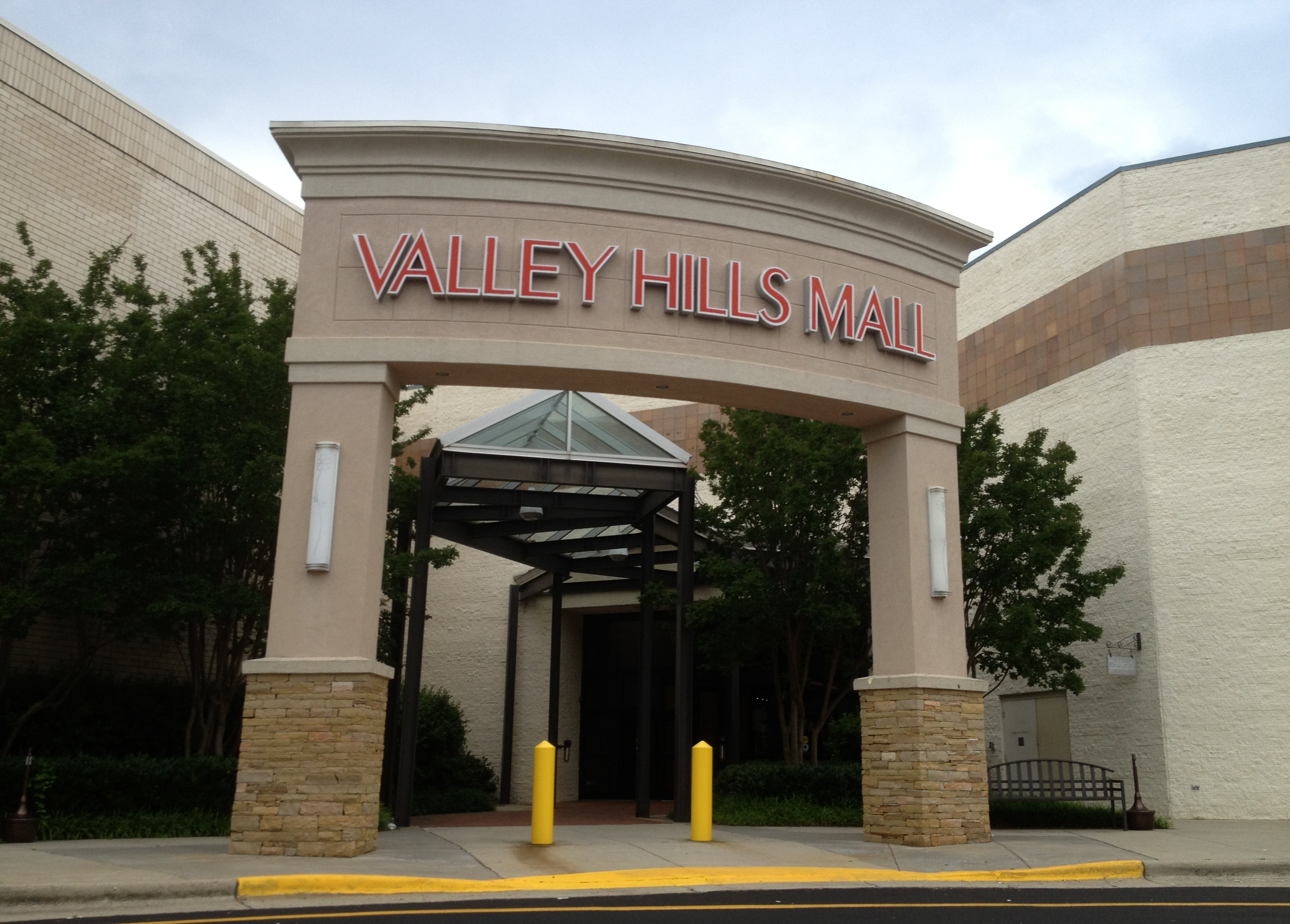
- Entrance to Valley Hills Mall, May 2012
- Location: Hickory, North Carolina, United States
- Coordinates: 35.7035126°N 81.3048679°W
- Address: Catawba Valley Blvd & Hwy 70
- Opened: August 16, 1978; 48 years ago
- Developer: Cadillac Fairview Corporation
- Manager: Mason Asset Management
- Owner: Namdar Realty Group
- Architect: RTKL Associates
- Num. of stores: 80
- Num. of anchor tenants: 4 (3 open, 1 vacant)
- Floor area: 862,703 sq ft (80,147.7 m^{2})
- Floors: 2
- Parking: 3,877
- Website: valleyhillsmall.com

Valley Hills Mall is a two-story regional shopping mall located in Hickory, North Carolina. It is currently owned and managed by Namdar Realty Group and its partner, Mason Asset Management. It is anchored by Belk, Dillard's, and J. C. Penney.

== History ==
The mall opened August 16, 1978, as the second mall in Hickory, the first being Catawba Mall (was Catawba Furniture Mall. Now a U-Haul storage and rental store). Its two anchors at the time were Belk and Sears. A 1988 expansion relocated J. C. Penney from Catawba Mall to Valley Hills Mall. A food court was located near Sears on the lower level. The mall was renovated in 1999 adding a fourth anchor, Dillard's, and a new, larger food court on the upper level. In May 2015, it was announced that a portion of the upper level of the mall would be reworked to allow for the opening of a new 20,000 square foot H&M store. On February 8, 2020, it was announced that Sears would be closing in April 2020.
