= Truliant Federal Credit Union =

Nonprofit financial institution in Winston-Salem, North Carolina, USA

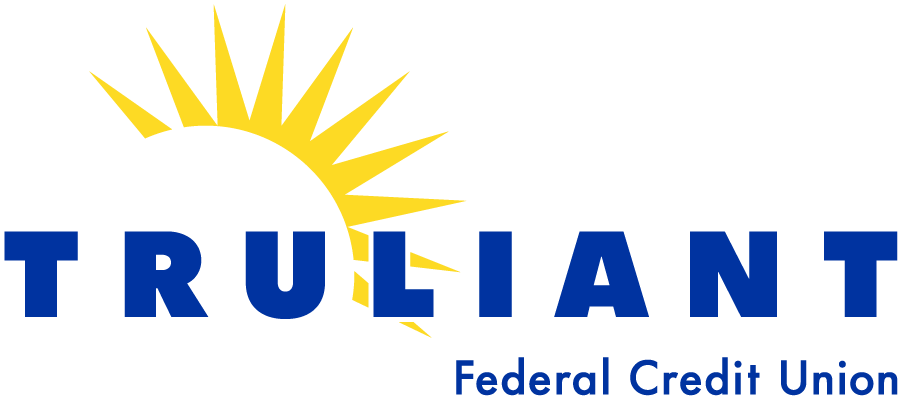

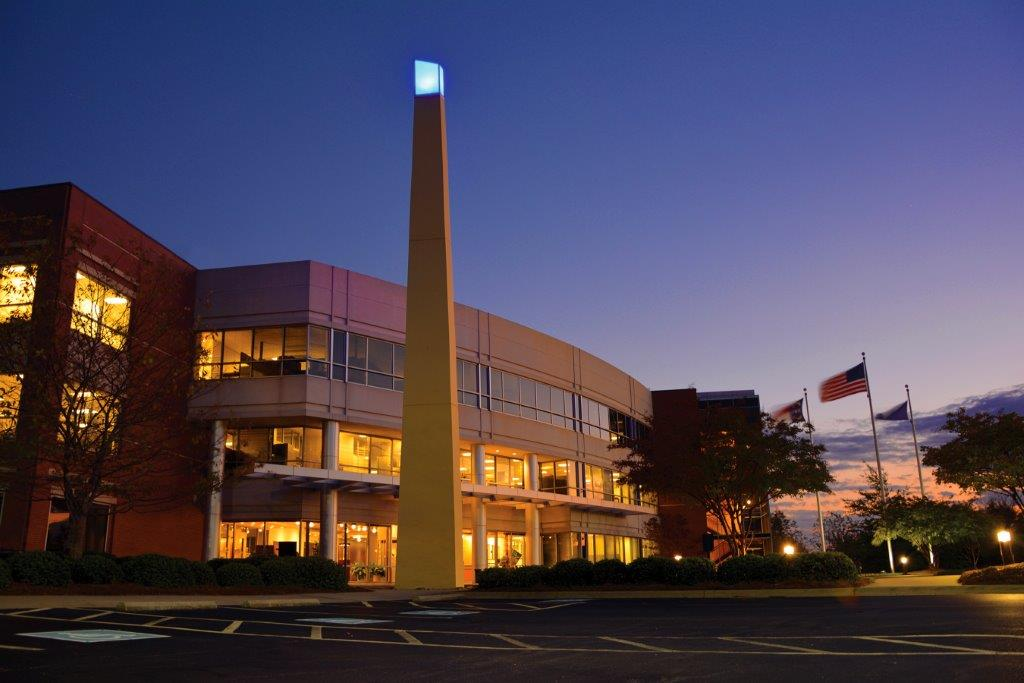
- Headquarters of Truliant Federal Credit Union, Winston-Salem, North Carolina
- Company type: Credit Union
- Industry: Financial Institution
- Founded: 1952
- Headquarters: Winston-Salem, North Carolina, United States
- Number of locations: 34 branches
- Area served: North Carolina, South Carolina, Virginia
- Key people: Todd Hall (President and CEO)
- Products: Consumer banking, business lending
- Net income: ▲US$91.1 million (2025)
- Total assets: ▲US$5.4 billion (2025)
- Members: ▼334,169
- Capital ratio: 14% Risk-based capital ratio (2025)
- Website: www.truliantfcu.org

Truliant Federal Credit Union is a nonprofit financial institution based in Winston-Salem, North Carolina. Chartered in 1952, the credit union provides financial guidance and services to members in North Carolina, South Carolina and Virginia. As of December 2025, Truliant has 334,169 members and $5.4 billion in assets.

== History ==
In 1952, Truliant Federal Credit Union was chartered as the Radio Shops Credit Union to serve employees of Western Electric in Winston-Salem, Greensboro, and Burlington. It was renamed North Carolina Works Federal Credit Union, then AT&T Family Federal Credit Union in 1983 with the goal of servicing employees of the telecommunications company.

AT&T Family Federal Credit Union expanded its services beginning in 1987 to include employee groups at Krispy Kreme, Polo Ralph Lauren and other companies. The American Bankers Association and five commercial banks sued AT&T Family Federal Credit Union in 1990 for expanding its membership to 150 employee groups nationwide, claiming the expansion violated the 1934 Federal Credit Union Act, which states members of a credit union must have a “common bond.” The U.S. Court of Appeals agreed, ruling against AT&T Family Credit Union in October 1996. The National Credit Union Administration appealed the ruling; it then went to the Supreme Court, which voted 5 to 4 against AT&T Family Credit Union and other regional credit unions, saying it violated the 1934 law. But President Bill Clinton signed a law in 1998 allowing AT&T Family Credit Union and all other credit unions to provide service to multiple groups.

In 1999, the credit union changed its name to Truliant. Truliant merged with Victory Masonic Credit Union, a historically African-American credit union in North Carolina, in 2004.

Todd Hall was named president and CEO of Truliant in January 2020.

Truliant opened an operations center in the 154,000-square-foot former Macy's space in Hanes Mall in January 2023. More than 200 people worked in a call center and other departments on two of the three floors. Expansion of the headquarters building had been considered, but rezoning was controversial.
