= Hanes Mall =

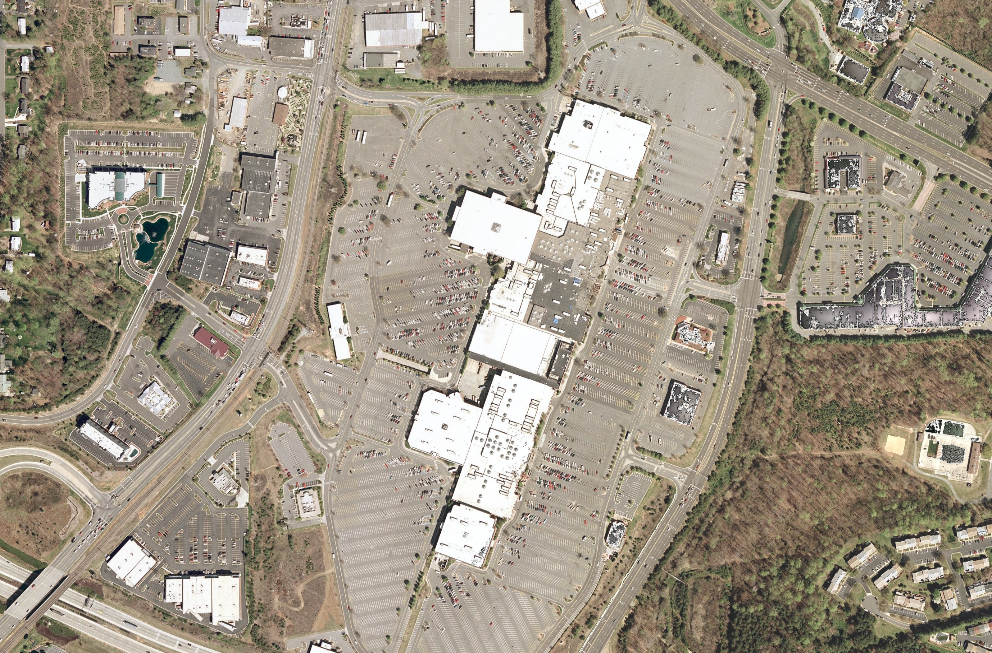
- A satellite view of Hanes Mall.
- Location: Winston-Salem, North Carolina, United States
- Coordinates: 36.069386°N 80.300113°W
- Address: 3320 Silas Creek Parkway
- Opened: August 6, 1975; 51 years ago
- Developer: Richard E. Jacobs Group
- Manager: CBL Properties
- Owner: CBL Properties
- Num. of stores: 170
- Num. of anchor tenants: 3
- Floor area: 1,435,164 square feet (133,331 m^{2})
- Floors: 2 (3 in Belk and Truliant Federal Credit Union)
- Parking: 7,861 spaces
- Website: shophanesmall.com

Hanes Mall is a shopping mall in Winston-Salem, North Carolina, located off of Stratford Road and Hanes Mall Boulevard, adjacent to Interstate 40. The mall has 1,435,164 square feet (133,331 m^{2}) in gross leasable area and 170 tenants. It is anchored by Belk, Dillard's, and JCPenney. Two anchor buildings were previously occupied by Macy's, now an operations center for Truliant Federal Credit Union, and Sears, which was purchased by Novant Health in 2018.

At the time of its opening in 1975, Hanes Mall was the largest shopping mall in North Carolina, though it was later eclipsed. It became the largest in the state again in 1990 after an expansion southwards from JCPenney, which added 50 new retailers, a food court, and the anchor stores Dillard's and Thalhimers.

== History ==
=== Development ===
In 1971, P. Huber Hanes Jr., a textile executive and land developer, sold part of his land in Winston-Salem, North Carolina, to Sears, Roebuck and Company for a new Sears store. Plans for a 76-acre (31 ha) shopping center named Hanes Mall that included Sears were confirmed in August 1970 in a rezoning petition. The mall was constructed on industry-zoned land on Silas Creek Parkway across from Forsyth Memorial Hospital, bounded by US Route 158 to the west and a proposed southern bypass for Interstate 40, which was completed in October 1992.

At the time of its opening, Hanes Mall was anchored by Belk, JCPenney and Sears, and it was North Carolina's largest shopping center, estimated by the Winston-Salem Journal as around 10 percent larger than the nearby Four Seasons Mall in Greensboro, North Carolina. Hanes Mall opened on August 6, 1975, with parking for 5,160 cars, accessible via an entrance on Silas Creek Parkway and one on Stratford Road. A four-screen General Cinema movie theater opened in December 1976 in a new building on the southwest corner of the mall.

=== South mall expansion ===
The city of Winston-Salem approved an expansion to Hanes Mall, in January 1989. The two-story expansion added around 527,490 square feet (49,005 m^{2}) of retail space and 2,700 parking spaces, expanding the mall by around 50 percent. Built by Fowler-Jones Construction, the project was the largest retail development in Winston-Salem since the construction of the original mall. Work began in the summer of 1990, and the new wing opened on October 4 that year, overtaking Four Seasons Town Centre as the state's largest mall.

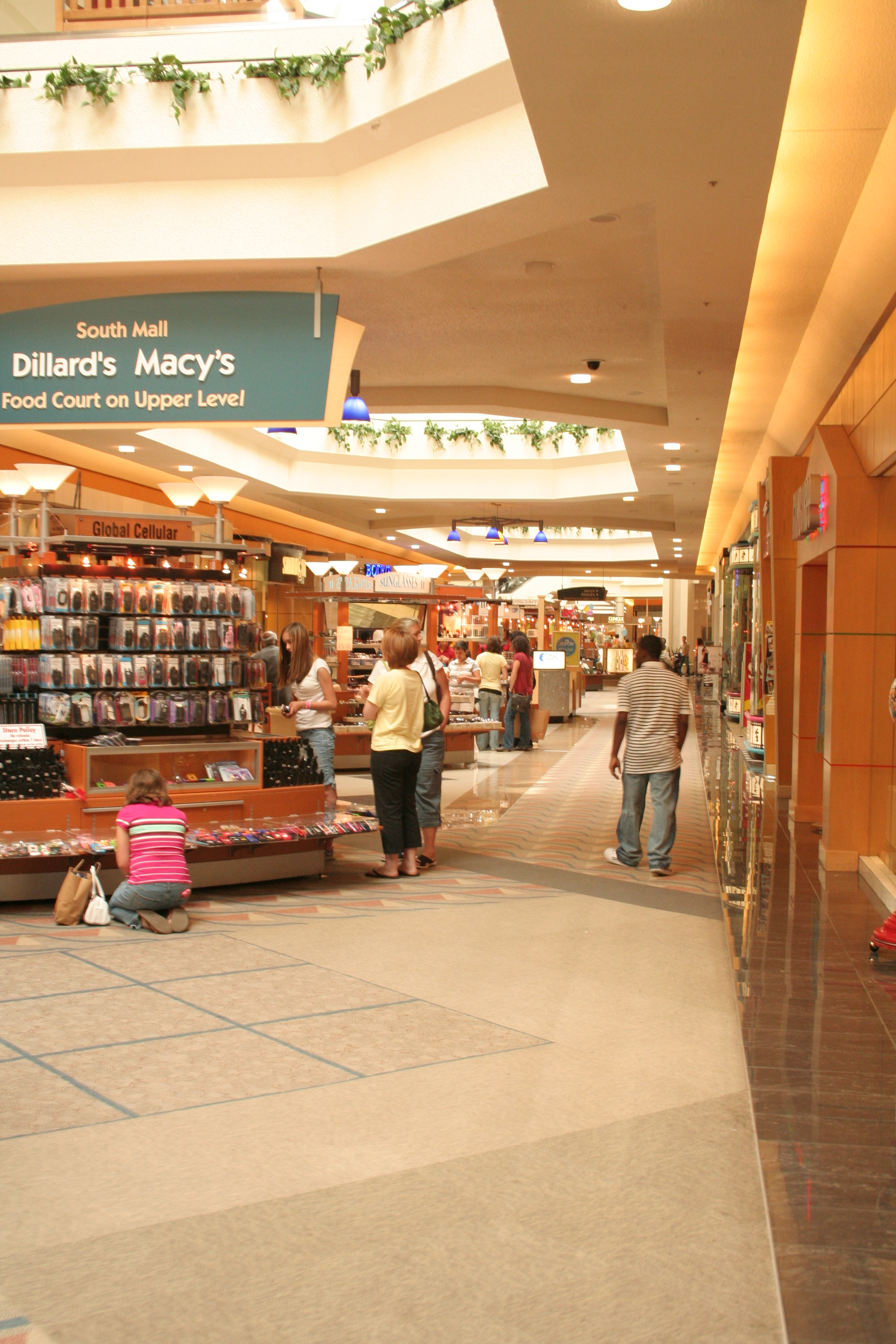
The interior of the south mall, which opened in 1990

The mall's new wing added 50 new stores, bringing the total to more than 170 and introducing new retailers to the area, including The Gap, Scribner's Bookstores, and Eddie Bauer. Because the new construction expanded southwards from JCPenney, shoppers have to pass through JCPenney to travel between the old and new sections. A food court, built under a glass skylight with ten restaurants and seating for 500 people, is located on the second floor above the main entrance to the expansion, a large glass arch on the east side facing Hanes Mall Boulevard. Two new vehicle entrances to the mall from Hanes Mall Boulevard and Stratford Road were added.

The expansion added two new anchor tenants, bringing the total to five. The Winston-Salem Journal reported in 1988 that the department store chain Ivey's would become an anchor, which opened as Dillard's after Dillard's acquired the company in 1990. The 143,000-square-foot (13,300 m^{2}) building sits across from the food court. The department store Thalhimers, which had opened a 44,000-square-foot (4,100 m^{2}) store in September 1975, relocated to a three-story, 151,415-square-foot (14,066.9 m^{2}) anchor on the southern end of the new building. Other projects included a remodeling of JCPenney and the construction of a third level in Belk, adding 75,000 square feet (7,000 m^{2}) of space.

Thalhimers was converted to Hecht's in 1992, after a sale to the May Company, and the store became Macy's in 2006.

The Hanes Mall movie theater closed in October 2000 amidst a wave of theater closures by General Cinema.

A carousel is located on the lower level. The mall is owned and operated by CBL & Associates Properties, Inc.

An H&M store opened in November 2011. This was the second store to open in the Carolinas, the first being in Raleigh.

=== Anchor closures ===
On November 8, 2018, it was announced that Sears would close as part of a plan to close 40 stores nationwide. The store closed in January 2019. On May 13, 2019, a Dave & Buster's opened in part of the previous Sears wing. In October 2018, Novant Health bought the 175,000-square-foot (16,300 m^{2}) building, the outparcel auto repair center, and parking lots for $14.5 million.

On January 8, 2020, it was announced that Macy's would also be closing as part of a plan to close 29 stores nationwide. The store closed in March 2020. Truliant Federal Credit Union opened an operations center in the space in January 2023.
