= Dunnavant's Building =

- U.S. National Register of Historic Places
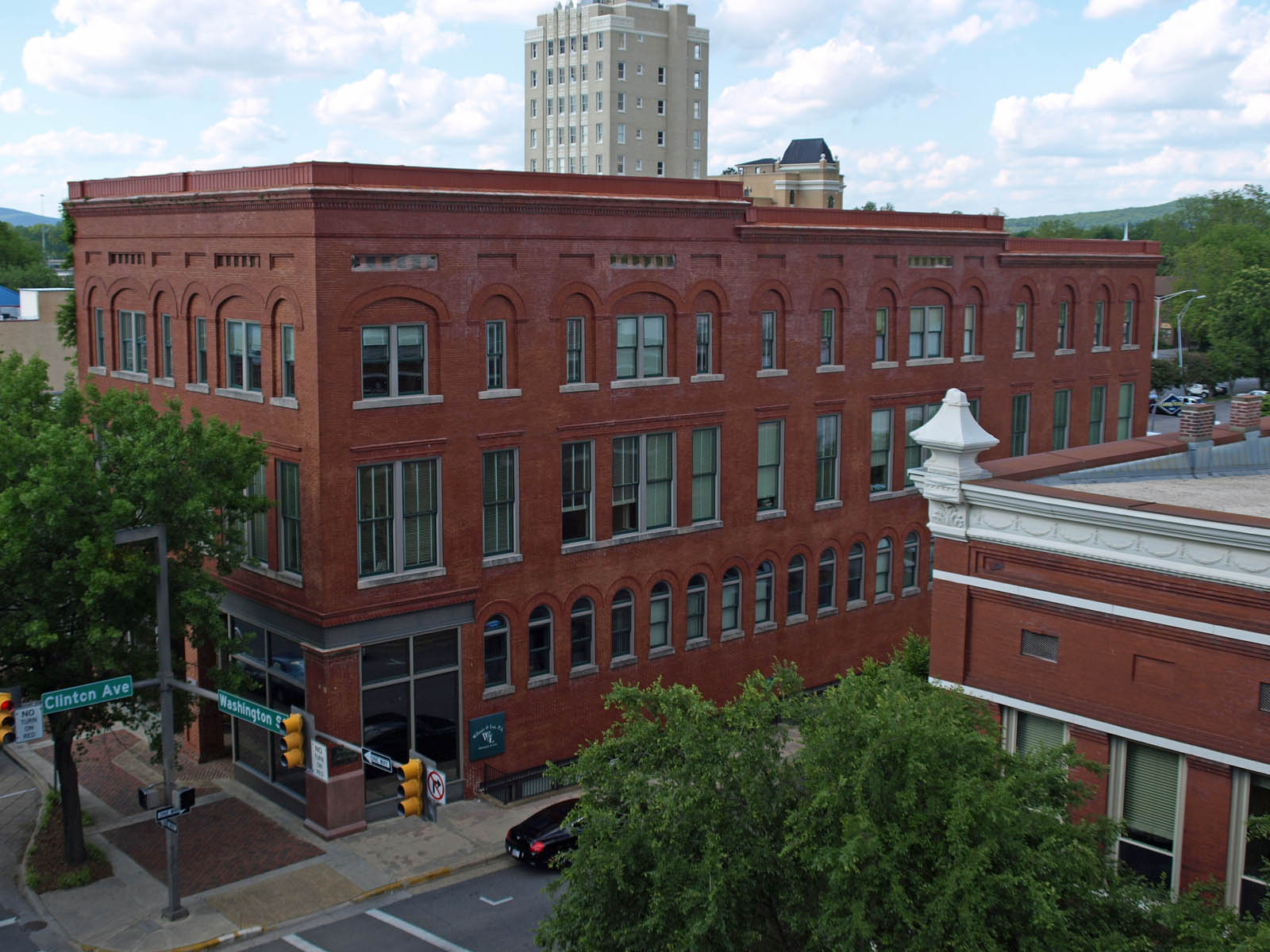
- The building in May 2011

- Location within Huntsville, Alabama Location within Alabama Location within the United States
- Location: 100 N. Washington St., Huntsville, Alabama
- Coordinates: 34°43′55″N 86°35′8″W
- Area: less than one acre
- Built: 1905
- Architect: Edgar Love
- Architectural style: Commercial Brick
- MPS: Downtown Huntsville MRA
- NRHP reference No.: 80000708
- Added to NRHP: September 22, 1980

The Dunnavant's Building is a historic commercial building in Huntsville, Alabama. It was built in 1905 by dry goods company Terry Brothers & Rogers. P. S. Dunnavant took control of the company in 1925, and the store remained in its downtown location until 1975. The third floor and roof were damaged in a fire in 1940. The ground floor on the Washington Street façade is framed by large brick piers with polished marble bases. Large display windows flank a recessed entry with a central column flush with the façade. All other windows are one-over-one sashes. A row of small, evenly spaced arched windows line the ground floor along the Clinton Avenue side. On the second floor façade there are two groups of four windows, each group sharing a stone sill. Third floor windows are smaller, and joined by brick arches. Windows along the Clinton Avenue side are similarly treated. The building is topped with a simple, denticulated cornice, with the roofline stepping down towards the rear of the building. The building was listed on the National Register of Historic Places in 1980.
