= LaTerra Development =

US real estate development company

- Type: Private
- Industry: Real Estate Development Company
- Founded: 2009
- Headquarters: Los Angeles, US
- Key people: Charles Tourtellotte, CEO; Chris Tourtellotte, Managing Director
- Website: laterradev.com

LaTerra Development is a Los Angeles based real estate development and investment company. The firm develops and invests in real estate projects mainly in and around California.

== History and description ==
LaTerra Development was founded by Charles Tourtellotte in 2009, who is chief executive officer (CEO). His son, Chris Tourtellotte, is the managing director of the firm. In 2015, El Monte City Council in collaboration with LaTerra announced a mixed-use residential-commercial project, the Garvey Square. The project was the first project under the City Council's "new mixed-multi use zoning and development regulations adopted in 2011 for the Garvey Corridor". In September 2015, China's Gemdale Corp partnered with LaTerra with the aim to build a six-story residential and commercial complex near Sunset Boulevard in Hollywood. During August 2016, LaTerra started the construction of two infill apartment projects totaling 325 units at Santa Ana and Chula Vista, California. In April 2018, LaTerra entitled 'a mixed-use collection of townhomes' in Pacific Highlands Ranch, San Diego, the project was later sold to KB Home. In April 2019, LaTerra announced the commencement of a multi-use project at Burbank, California. The Project was named as LaTerra Burbank and it included 573 apartments in two towers and a seven-story, 307-room hotel with a total worth of US$375 million. In June 2019, LaTerra launched two apartment complex projects namely Broadway & Cloverfield in Santa Monica. In March 2019, LaTerra received the approval for the 96 unit apartment complex in Los Feliz as part of a 246 unit assemblage.

In June 2019, Orange County Register reported that LaTerra's new apartment project in Santa Ana was sold for $101 million or $445,000 per unit. In June 2020, LaTerra initiated a joint venture with QuadReal Property Group where the latter invested $250 million.

In July 2020, LaTerra started a redevelopment project in West Hollywood, in the location of Madison Car Wash, established in 1964. The West Hollywood Preservation Alliance claimed historical significance in the existing two-story building, which was designed following neo-Googie style. Though West Hollywood Daily News reported "the historic value was not enough to save the vintage car wash" and accordingly the structures were dismantled and 71 apartment units and 8700 sq ft of retail is under construction.
