= Columbiana Centre =

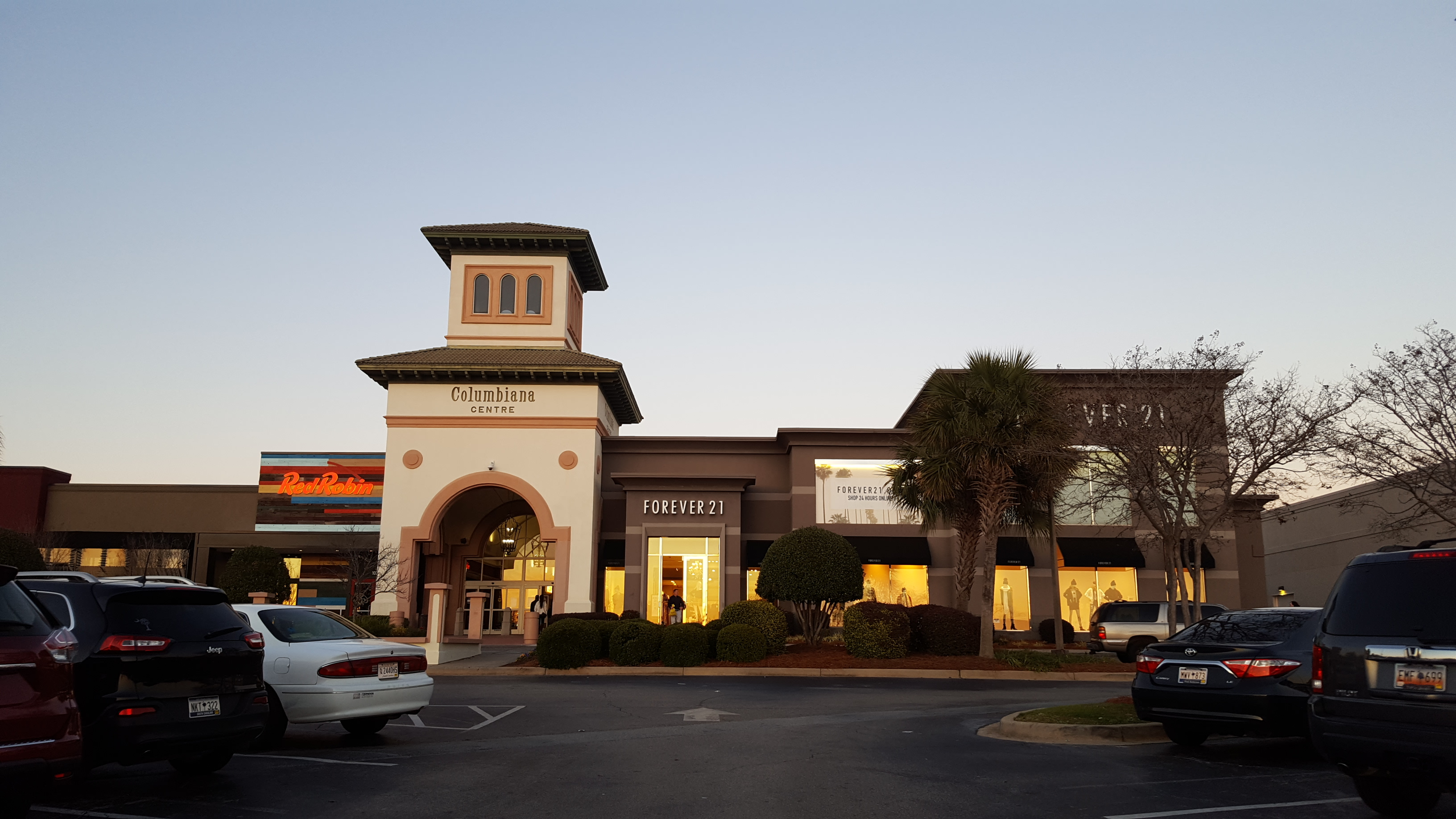
- Entrance to Columbiana Centre, December 2017
- Location: Columbia, Lexington County, South Carolina
- Coordinates: 34°4′44″N 81°9′27″W
- Opened: 1990; 36 years ago
- Developer: Homart Development Company
- Manager: GGP
- Owner: GGP
- Num. of stores: 99
- Num. of anchor tenants: 4
- Floor area: 788,103 sq ft (73,217.2 m^{2}) (GLA)
- Floors: 1 (2 in Women's Belk and Dillard's)
- Parking: 4,200 spaces
- Website: columbianacentre.com

Columbiana Centre is an indoor super-regional shopping mall located off Interstate 26/U.S. Route 76 on Harbison Boulevard in Columbia, South Carolina that opened in 1990. It is the dominant shopping center in the Columbia Metropolitan Area. Most of the mall's territory is located in Lexington County, although portions of the mall extend into Richland County. The regional mall has 788,103 square feet (73,217.2 m^{2}) of retail space. Its anchors include two Belk stores, Dillard's, and JCPenney. The Men's Belk opened in early 2015 in the former Sears which closed in 2014.

== History ==
Columbiana Centre, developed by Homart Development Company, opened in 1990 with two anchor stores: Belk and Sears. Dillard's was added as the third anchor in 1993, as was a new wing extending diagonally north. In 1995, J. B. White was added as another anchor. In 1998, JB White was acquired by Dillard's and the JB White location in the mall was closed. Belk took over the former JB White space and Parisian came to the mall in the former Belk space. In 2005, Parisian closed and JCPenney took over the former Parisian space. The next major anchor change was brought about by the closure of Sears in March 2014. In 2015, Belk Men's Store was expanded into the former Sears space, adding 50,000 square feet of space for Belk and making it one of Belk's flagship stores.

On February 13, 2017, a Dave and Buster's store opened in the front exterior side of the mall, filling the space vacated by Sears not already filled by the Men's Belk. In March 2018, Forever 21’s Riley Rose cosmetics store opened at the mall.

=== 2022 shooting ===
A mass shooting occurred at the mall on the afternoon of April 16, 2022. Fifteen people ranging from 15 to 73 years old were hurt during the incident, nine of which were from gunshot wounds. Three people were later arrested and charged with multiple crimes ranging from unlawful use of a firearm to attempted murder. On July 19, 2022, two anonymous sisters, who were victims of the shooting, filed a lawsuit against the Columbiana Mall for "negligence, gross negligence, and recklessness for failing to provide adequate safety or protection to tenants and shoppers." The sisters are seeking $20 million in the lawsuit against the shopping mall. All three suspects, all from Columbia, were later convicted. In February 2025, one of the shooters, Jewayne Price was sentenced to 35 years for nine counts of assault and battery of a high and aggravated nature and two more for attempted murder. One month later, a second shooter, Amari Smith, was sentenced to 30 years for the same crimes as Price, albeit one less count of attempted murder. Finally in April, the third and final shooter, Marquise Robinson, was sentenced to 30 years for nine counts total, but for only assault and battery of a high and aggravated nature.
