= Belk =

American retail chain

Belk, Inc.

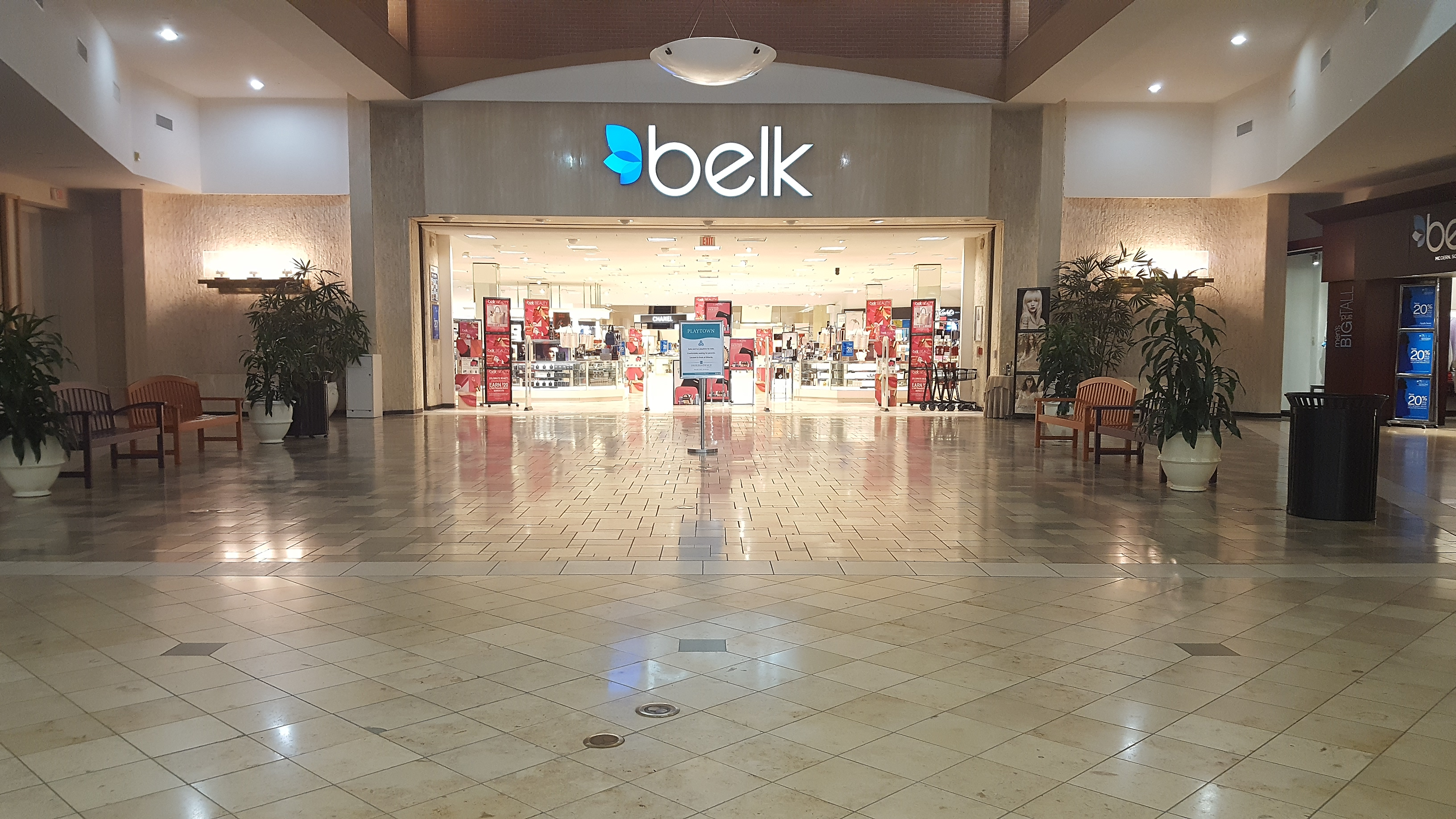
- Mall entrance to the Belk store at Independence Mall in Wilmington, North Carolina (2017)
- Formerly: New York Racket (1888–1898); Belk Brothers (1898–1909)
- Type: Private
- Industry: Retail
- Genre: Department stores
- Founded: 1888; 138 years ago in Monroe, North Carolina, United States
- Founder: William Henry Belk
- Headquarters: Charlotte, North Carolina, United States
- Number of locations: 293 (2019)
- Key people: Don Hendricks (CEO)
- Products: Clothing; footwear; bedding; furniture; jewelry; beauty products; housewares
- Revenue: ▼US$3.7 billion (2017)
- Number of employees: 10,639 (2022)
- Parent: Sycamore Partners (2015–present)
- Website: belk.com

Belk, Inc. is an American department store chain founded in 1888 by William Henry Belk. Local partnerships allowed Belk to expand during the 1900s, and resulted in several Belk co-brandings. The distinct legal entities were consolidated into a single company and uniform Belk brand in 1998. It was acquired by private equity firm Sycamore Partners in 2015.

== History ==
=== Early history ===
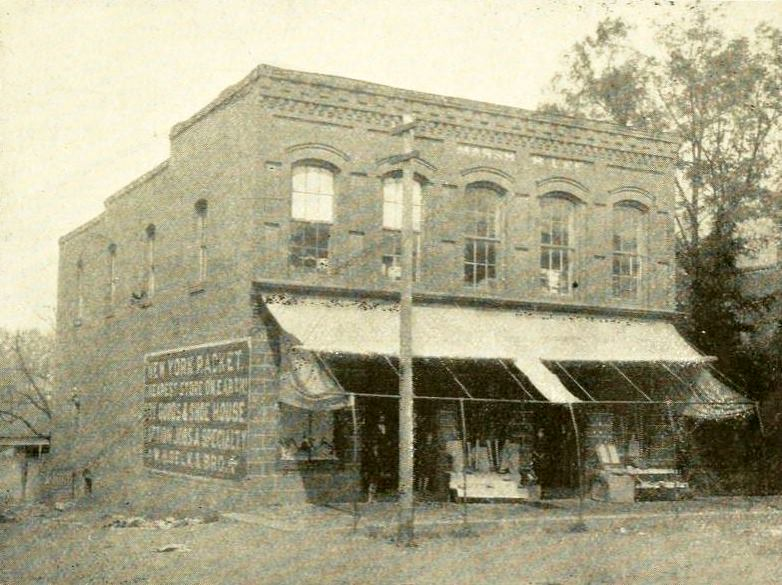
The first Belk, established as New York Racket, in 1902

Belk was founded in 1888 by William Henry Belk in Monroe, North Carolina, outside Charlotte. The store was first called New York Racket and then Belk Brothers, after Belk made his brother, physician John Belk, his partner. Belk bought merchandise in large quantities to pass savings on to customers and sold at fixed prices, which was a relatively unusual practice at the time.

=== 1900s ===
By 1909, the company had moved its headquarters to Charlotte and built a huge flagship store on Trade and Tryon Streets in downtown Charlotte, which would remain the company's headquarters until it was closed in 1988 to make way for the construction of what is now Bank of America Corporate Center. The business grew steadily, relying on "bargain sales" and advertising to grow the business and increase its influence throughout the South.

Beginning in 1921 with the Leggett Bros. stores of South Boston, Virginia, the Belk company grew by investing in various partnerships with local merchandisers in nearby markets. Belk's growth out of the Southeast was pushed by Earl Jones Sr and the Belk-Jones brand that opened the first Belk west of the Mississippi in 1947. The Jones family and the Belk-Jones brand continued to grow Belk's westward expansion. This complex story is chronicled in a book published by Belk—Belk, Inc.: The Company and the Family That Built It—about the evolution of the company.

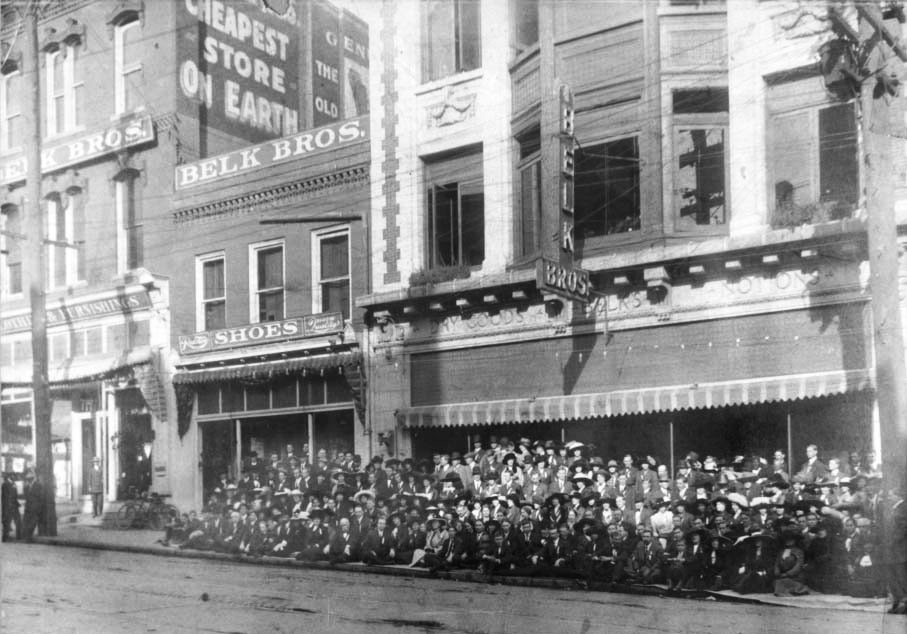
Belk Bros. store in Charlotte, North Carolina, c. 1910

This structure allowed Belk to expand quickly and permitted local variation, but resulted in a diluted brand identity since most stores were co-branded. By the 1990s, the system had become increasingly untenable: stores were held by over 350 separate legal entities, Belk family members disagreed about whether to maintain or sweep away the structure, and some local partners threatened stability by selling their stakes. For example, the heirs of John G. Parks, majority owners of the Parks-Belk chain, sold their interests to Proffitt's, a competitor. The Belks quickly sold their stake as well, although Belk would later purchase the stores back as part of its later acquisition of the entire Proffitt's chain. When Proffitt's made an offer for the Leggett family's stake, which included 42 stores comprising about 20 percent of Belk's revenue, John and Tom Belk were forced to respond by forming a new company in 1996 that bought the Leggetts out. This move accelerated the slow trend of consolidating the store's ownership under the Belks.

In April 1997 Belk closed its smallest store located in the smallest town with a Belk—Chesterfield, South Carolina—with a population of less than 1,500. In 1998, the company formed a new entity (Belk, Inc.) that merged the 112 remaining Belk companies, swapping the existing partners' local interests for shares in the combined entity; for example, the Hudson family in Raleigh received almost 5% of the shares. The same year, Belk made a deal to acquire seven Dillard's locations in exchange for nine of theirs so that each could build on regional strengths. Slowly, Belk eliminated the dual brands, completing the process with a chain-wide Belk rebranding in the fall of 2010.

=== 2000s ===
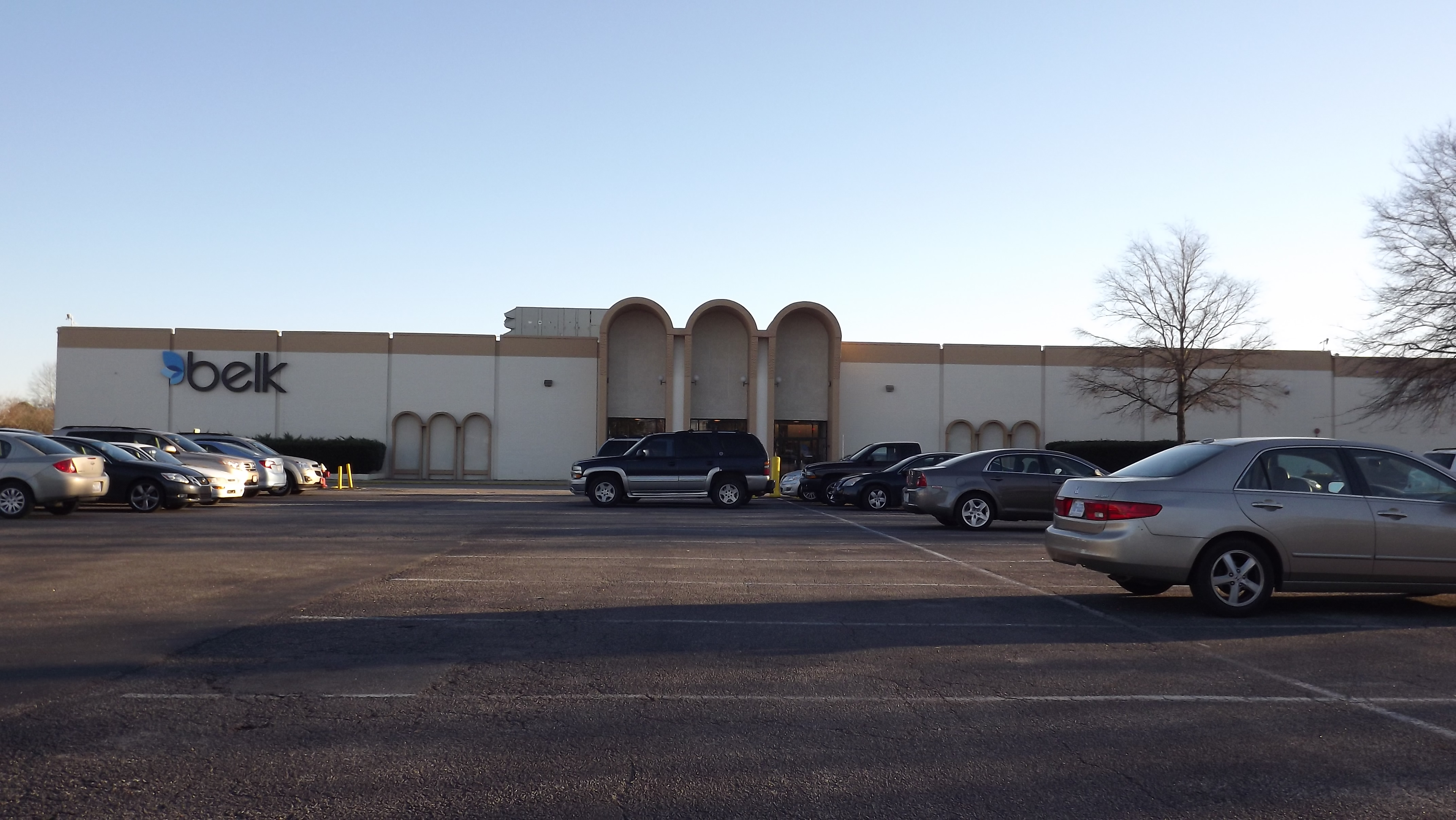
One of the earliest prototype 1960s-era stores to feature the trademark Belk arches, Southgate Mall, Elizabeth City, North Carolina, as shown in 2015

On July 5, 2005, Belk completed the purchase of 47 Proffitt's and McRae's department stores from Saks Incorporated, primarily in Tennessee and Mississippi. Belk rebranded the 39 Proffitt's and McRae's stores to the Belk nameplate on March 8, 2006. Just over a year later, Belk purchased 38 Parisian department stores from Saks on October 2, 2006. Although most Parisian stores were downgraded to the Belk nameplate since September 12, 2007, some duplicate Parisian stores were closed, as at The Mall at Barnes Crossing in Tupelo, Mississippi, Richland Mall (then known as Midtown at Forest Acres), Columbiana Centre in Columbia, South Carolina, and Citadel Mall in Charleston, South Carolina. Four Parisian stores in Indiana, Michigan, and Ohio, plus a store under construction at the time in Michigan, were sold by Belk to The Bon-Ton Stores, Inc. Integrating the larger, more upscale Parisian stores proved a challenge for Belk, and spurred the creation of the company's flagship strategy.

During the fourth quarter of 2005, Belk completed the sale of its private-label credit card division, Belk National Bank, to GE MoneyBank, a division of GE Consumer Finance. Consumers were issued new Belk credit cards replacing the old ones issued by BNB. All new Belk cards are now issued by GE MoneyBank, now known as Synchrony Bank.

As Belk made acquisitions, the websites acquired were changed to redirect to Belk.com. Belk operated limited electronic commerce on its website. Home furnishings such as bedding, small kitchen appliances, crystal, dinnerware, and china have been offered for several years to online shoppers as a part of the chain's online bridal and gift registry. The chain revamped its website and registry on September 15, 2008. Celebrity-branded product lines were also introduced, including a partnership with actress Kristin Davis for women's apparel and accessories collection which debuted in fall 2008 in 125 store locations and online. However, that product line was discontinued in late 2009.

=== 2010s ===
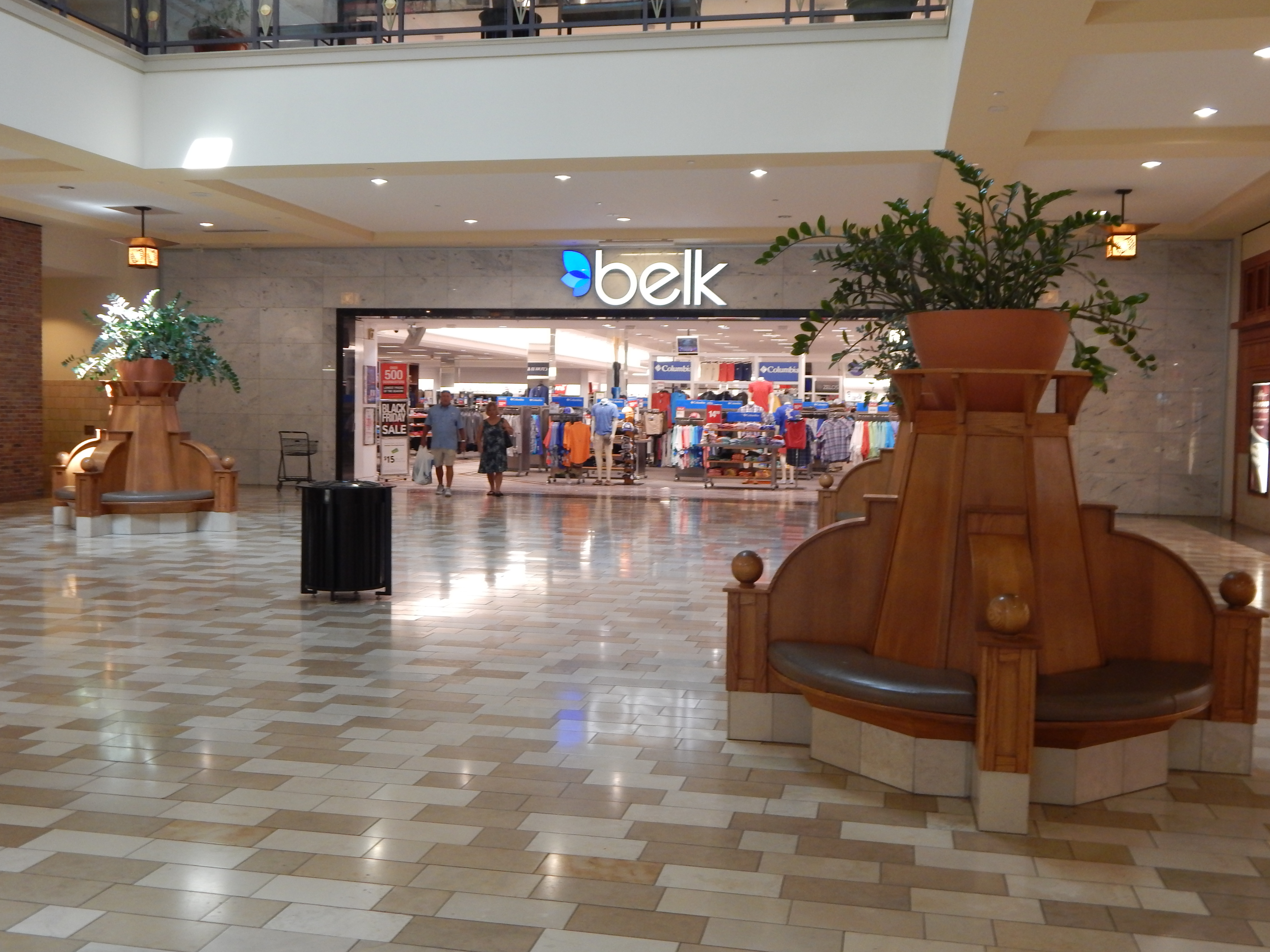
Belk at the Mall of Georgia in Buford, Georgia (2019)

On October 3, 2010, the News & Observer reported that Belk planned to update its logo. On October 12 at SouthPark Mall, Belk introduced the new logo, its first since 1967. The chain embarked on a $70 million marketing campaign that replaced the old slogan "All for You!" with a new slogan, "Modern. Southern. Style." Sixty stores got new signs in the first phase, with the remainder getting new signs throughout 2011. Advertisements for Belk & Co. jewelry continue to use a variation of the old logo.

By 2014, the chain operated 293 stores in 16 states, generating $4 billion in sales in 2014. The state of North Carolina leads in the number of Belk stores with 65 stores followed by Georgia and South Carolina with 45 and 35 stores respectively. Its typical store covers 100,000 to 180,000 square feet. Fifty percent of its stores are in regional malls, another 40% in open-air community or retail parks, and 10% in open-air lifestyle centers.

=== Acquisition by Sycamore Partners ===
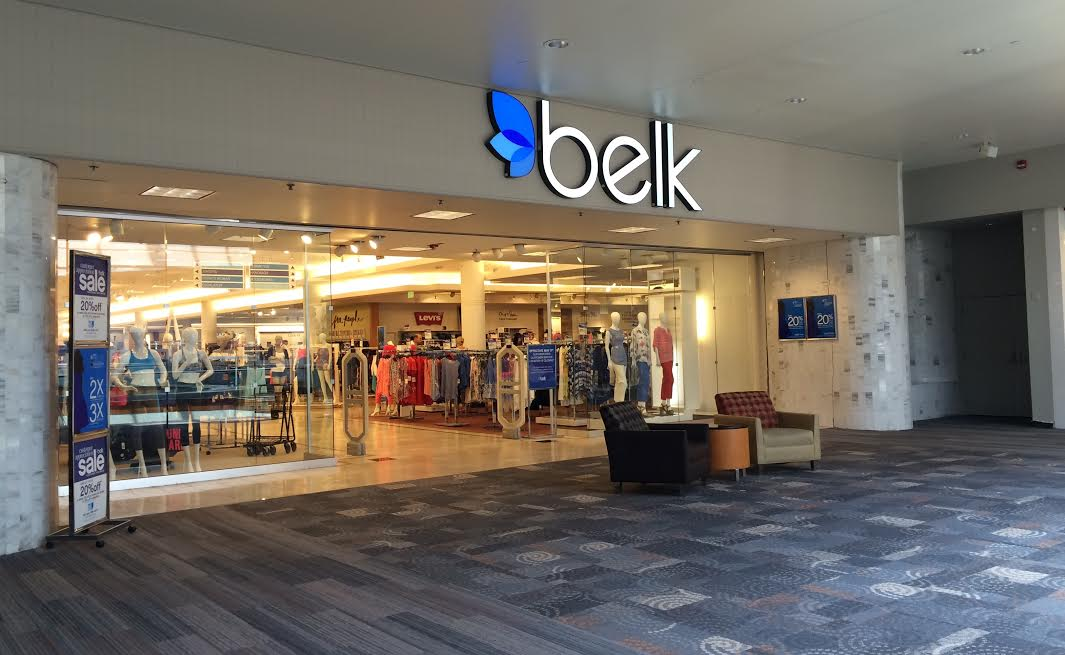
Belk store at Haywood Mall in Greenville, South Carolina (2016)

On April 3, 2015, news reports revealed that Belk was exploring "strategic alternatives," including a possible sale of the company.

On August 24, 2015, Belk announced that it had entered into a definitive merger agreement to be acquired by New York–based private equity firm Sycamore Partners. The acquisition was completed on December 10, 2015.

On June 29, 2016, Belk announced that effective as of July 5, Lisa Harper, CEO of Hot Topic (another Sycamore Partners-owned company), would replace Tim Belk as CEO of Belk. This would be the first time since the founding of the company that a non-Belk family member would head the company.

In July 2020, it was announced that Sycamore Partners had made a $1.75 billion offer to acquire department store chain and competitor JCPenney out of bankruptcy. Under the terms of the plan, two hundred fifty JCPenney stores would have been rebranded as Belk in an effort to compete directly with Macy's, while the remaining JCPenney stores would be liquidated. But JCPenney was ultimately acquired by Brookfield Property Partners and Simon Property Group.

=== 2021: One-day bankruptcy ===
On January 20, 2021, it was announced that KKR and other major lenders were in talks with Belk to prevent the chain from declaring bankruptcy, having proposed a deal under which a portion of Belk's $2.6 billion debt would be converted to equity and Sycamore would retain an ownership stake.

On January 26, 2021, it was announced that Belk would file for Chapter 11 bankruptcy, continuing to operate normally through the bankruptcy process, which Sycamore expected to exit by the end of February 2021. Sycamore would retain majority control of Belk, while private equity firms KKR and Blackstone Credit would receive a minority stake in the company following its emergence from bankruptcy. The plan would liquidate about $450 million of debt and raise $225 million in new capital, with no employee layoffs or store closures anticipated.

On February 23, 2021, it was announced that Belk had filed Chapter 11 bankruptcy in Houston, the first step in an organization plan that would allow Belk's owner Sycamore Partners to cede a large stake in the company to its lenders while maintaining control of the company. If the bankruptcy plan were approved it would give Belk new capital while cutting its debt load by about $450 million, reducing its total debt to about $1.46 billion, according to the company.

On February 24, 2021, one day after filing for Chapter 11 bankruptcy, the company announced that it had completed its financial restructuring, finalizing an expedited pre-packaged, one-day reorganization and emerging well-positioned for long-term growth. As part of the restructuring, Belk received $225 million of new capital, reduced its debt by approximately $450 million, and extended maturities on all term loans until July 2025. The plan received nearly unanimous support from existing lenders, supply providers, and landlords to be paid in full as normal operations continue at all store locations, as well as on Belk's e-commerce platform.

=== New growth ===
On July 6, 2021, Belk announced that Nir Patel had been promoted to CEO from his previous position of president and chief merchandising officer. Patel replaces Lisa Harper, who had been the company's CEO since July 2016, and would now serve as executive chair of the Belk Board of Directors. Along with the CEO change, Belk also announced that Don Hendricks would be promoted from Chief Operating Officer to president. The company also hired Chris Kolbe as EVP, Chief Merchandising Officer.

In May 2023, it was reported that Belk was expanding a new store format, Belk Outlet. There were 16 locations, 10 of which had just recently opened.

== Brand identity ==
Belk produces a private label brand called Crown & Ivy.

=== Logos ===
Belk logo used from 1968 until 2010; the "all for you!" slogan was introduced in the late 1990s

Belk logo with icon, used alongside a text-only version, since 2010

== Sponsorships ==
In December 2010, Belk announced that it would become the title sponsor for the former Meineke Car Care Bowl (played in Charlotte), renamed as the Belk Bowl beginning in 2011. The sponsorship would continue for three years. On July 18, 2013, Belk announced a six-year extension of the bowl partnership with the Atlantic Coast Conference (ACC), beginning in 2014. Under the agreement, the bowl featured teams from the ACC and the Southeastern Conference (SEC). On November 20, 2019, Belk announced that it would no longer be the title sponsor for the bowl game following the 2019 bowl game. Overall, Belk was the title sponsor for nine editions of the bowl (2011–2019).

== Flagship locations ==
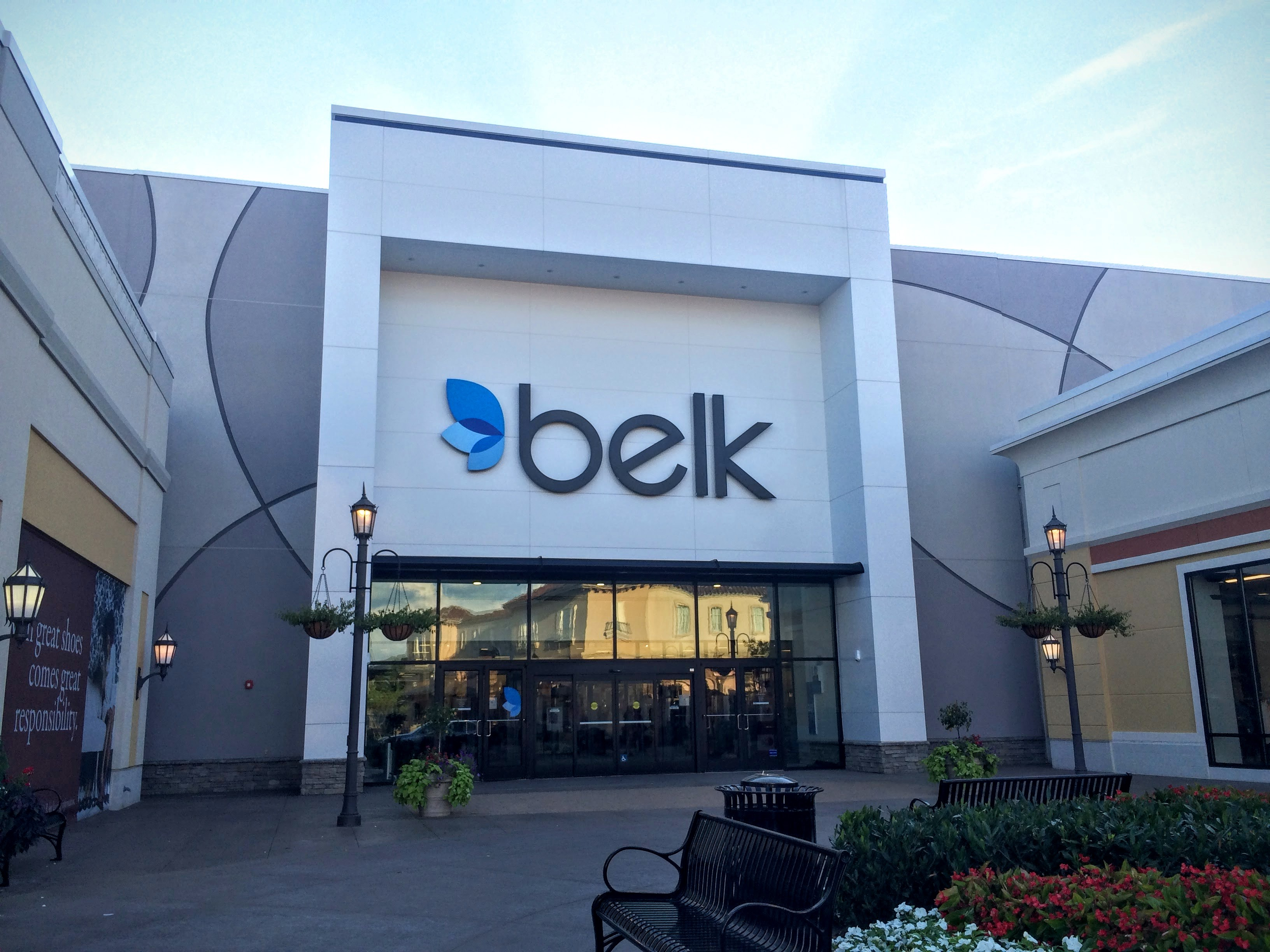
A flagship store at Bridge Street Town Centre in Huntsville, Alabama

The chain has multiple "flagship" locations—larger locations in urban and metropolitan centers, and a wider array of merchandise and services including in-store salons. As of 2014, the chain had 18 flagship locations, and was planning to upgrade more locations.

- SouthPark Mall, in Charlotte, North Carolina, houses the chain's largest store, with more than 336,414 square feet (31,253.9 m^{2}). The store was built in 1970 as one of the mall's original anchor stores. The mall was co-developed by the Belk and Ivey families.
- Riverchase Galleria, in Hoover, Alabama, houses a flagship store, made official after a recent renovation brings it up to par with the mall's rival lifestyle center, The Summit.
- The Summit, in Birmingham, Alabama, houses a flagship store built in 1997 as a Parisian store and one of the lifestyle center's original anchors. Its intended conversion to a Belk flagship was announced on April 25, 2007, with the reorganization complete by September 2007. It had been Parisian's flagship store.
- Crabtree in Raleigh, North Carolina, where Hudson Belk built an elaborate 236,000-square-foot (21,900 m^{2}) store in 1972 (subsequently expanded to 305,000 square feet (28,300 m^{2}) in 2007, with separate locations for menswear and in-mall cosmetics counters) in North Carolina's high-tech Research Triangle.
- Columbiana Centre in Columbia, South Carolina, is home to one of Belk flagship stores, where Belk expanded into the former Sears anchor location adding 50,000-square-foot (4,600 m^{2}) to the already over 150,000-square-foot (14,000 m^{2}) store in 2015, creating separate location for men's wear department, in one of South Carolina's biggest malls.
- The Shoppes at Bel Air, in Mobile, Alabama, opened in September 2016, a 237,000-square-foot (22,000 m^{2}) that replaced a former Sears. In order to do that, Belk closed two stores that were across from each other: the former Parisian store in the mall and the former McRae's across the street in the former Springdale Mall.
