= Miller's Department Store =

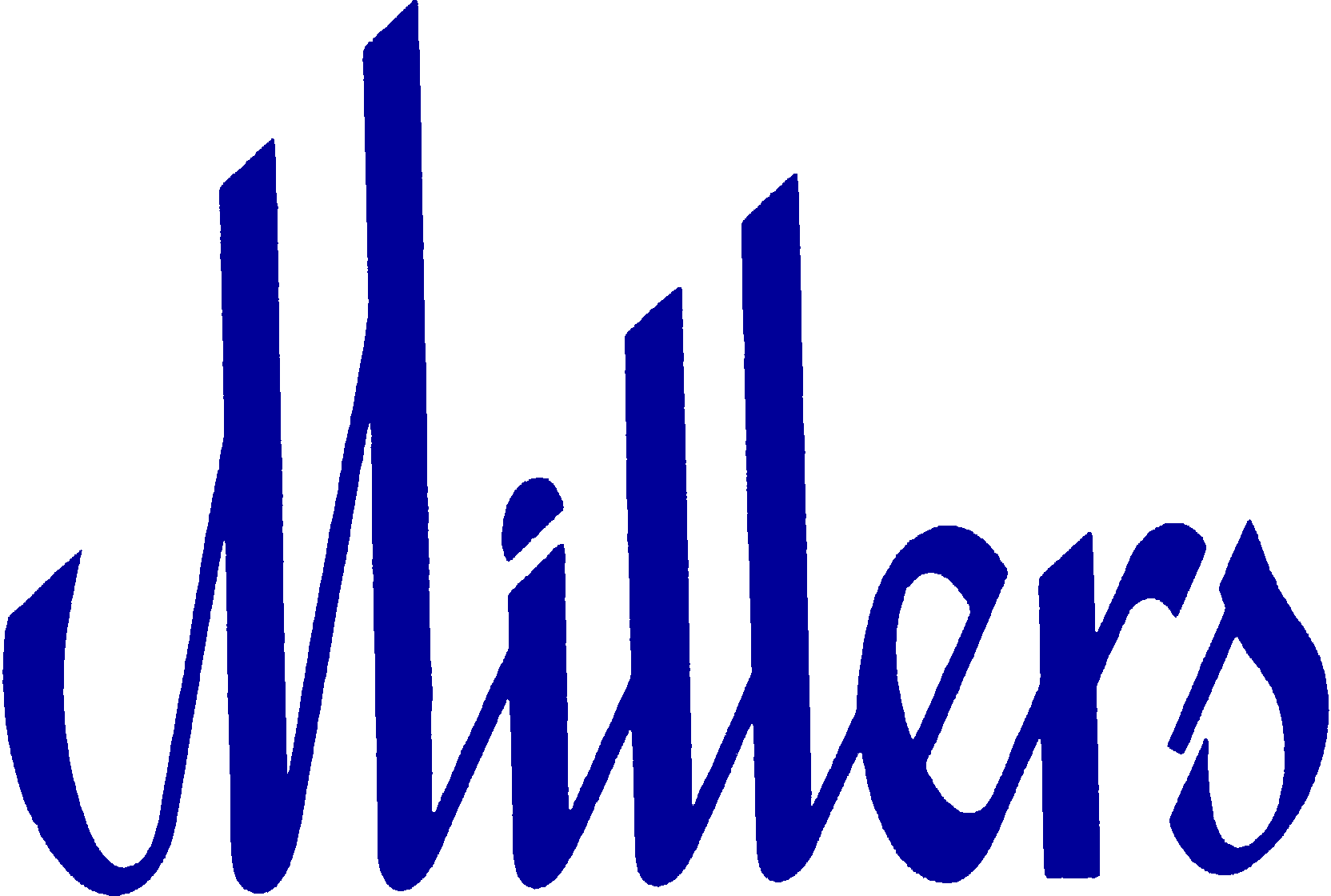
- Industry: Retail
- Founded: 1889
- Founder: Gustavus Hindman Miller; Frank Miller
- Defunct: 1992
- Fate: Sold to Hess's; later converted to Dillard's
- Headquarters: Chattanooga & Knoxville, Tennessee
- Products: Clothing, footwear, bedding, furniture, jewelry, beauty products, and housewares.

Miller's Department Store was a chain of department stores based in East Tennessee.

== History ==
Miller's traced its history to the New York Racket Store, established in 1889 at 510 Market Street in Chattanooga by brothers Gus and Frank Miller. After a fire destroyed the Richardson Building in 1897, the brothers built a new store at Seventh and Market Streets that was known as Miller Brothers Department Store. Miller Brothers Department Store of Chattanooga remained a privately held company until 1973. A son of Gus Miller later become one of the founders of Miller, Inc. in Knoxville.

Miller's Department Store was formed August 1, 1973, from the consolidation by retail conglomerate Garfinckel, Brooks Brothers, Miller & Rhoads, Inc. of the two related Tennessee-based department stores: Miller Brothers of Chattanooga and Miller, Inc., of Knoxville.

At formation the combined chain had 11 stores and two specialty shops in East Tennessee, Georgia, Virginia, and North Carolina.

In 1981, with the acquisition of its parent conglomerate, Miller's became a part of Allied Stores. In 1986, the chain was acquired in a hostile takeover by Hess's; then converted to Dillard's by 1993.

== Notable locations ==
=== Chattanooga flagship store ===
- Miller Brothers Department Store
- U.S. National Register of Historic Places
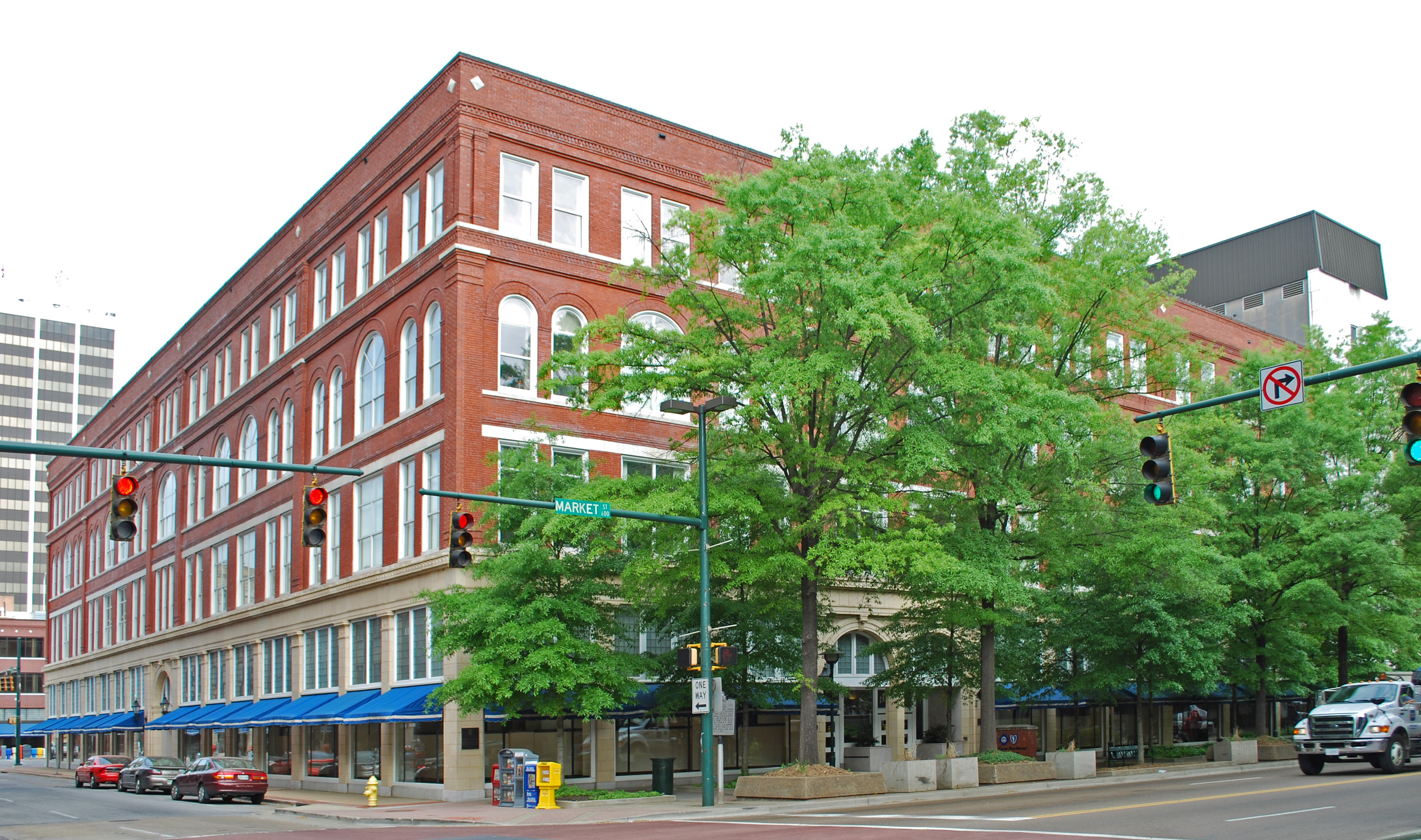
- The former Miller's store pictured in 2010

- Location within Tennessee Location within the United States
- Location: 629 Market St., Chattanooga, Tennessee
- Coordinates: 35°2′56″N 85°18′34″W
- Area: 0.8 acres (0.32 ha)
- Built: 1898
- Architect: Hunt, Reuben H.
- NRHP reference No.: 87001115
- Added to NRHP: September 17, 1987

The Miller Brothers of Chattanooga flagship store, at 629 Market Street (corner of Seventh St.) in Chattanooga, Tennessee, was known for having Chattanooga's only "subway," which consisted of an underground shopping area that tunneled beneath Broad Street to their home store at the corner of Seventh and Broad with a connecting parking garage. The four-story store boasted two snackbars and a Tea Room as well as many amenities that are not to be found in any current retail establishment. On September 17, 1987, it was listed in the National Register of Historic Places.

The downtown Chattanooga store was closed in 1986 and sold to BlueCross BlueShield of Tennessee, which used it for offices. In 2011 the building was sold to the engineering firm Mesa Associates.

=== Knoxville flagship store ===
From an advertisement in the 1902 University of Tennessee school annual yearbook, Miller's Department Store was operating contemporaneously at the location of "315, 317, and 319 Gay Street" in Knoxville. The Miller, Inc. store in downtown Knoxville, erected in 1905, was a fixture of the shopping culture in the area, and a foundation of the downtown business district. The location at 445 Gay Street is still known as the Miller's Building. The building was constructed in the Edwardian style, and designed by Knoxville-based architect, R. F. Graf. A 1911 addition to the north was in the same style as the original building, but an expansion in 1935 was in the Art Deco style. In 1998, the building was restored, including the recreation of original details and return of the buildings to the earliest appearance of each of the three component sections. The building is currently home to the Knoxville Utilities Board.

Miller's later moved to a building a few blocks west at 600 Henley Street, constructed about 1954, which had housed a Rich's store and eventually became a Hess's store. This mid-century modern building received a design award from the American Institute of Architects at the time it was built. It features structural glazed tile, polychrome glazed brick, undulating concrete canopies, and corner towers enclosed in glass. Like the Gay Street store it also had a tunnel which connected the store to its multi-level parking structure across Henley Street. The Henley Street building is currently used by the University of Tennessee for a conference center. While the parking structure was modified for the 1982 World's Fair and eventually leveled for the construction of the new Knoxville Convention Center, the tunnel still exists and is used for storage and access to the conference center's garbage disposal area. Former Knoxville councilman Don Ferguson has recently petitioned the university to allow the public to use the tunnel again.

Like many department stores of the era, Miller's incorporated a restaurant, snack bar, and bakery counter. Miller's coconut cakes were very popular with patrons, and the recipe is still a highly sought-after item.

Author James Agee described Miller's as a "profoundly matronly store" in his 1957 Pulitzer Prize-winning novel, A Death in the Family. Cormac McCarthy mentions the store in his 1979 novel, Suttree, describing it as a "perfumed and airconditioned sanctuary."

=== Branch stores ===
In addition to the Chattanooga flagship store, Miller's Chattanooga area locations included Eastgate Mall, Village Mall in Cleveland and Northgate Mall in Hixson, where Miller Bros. was one of the two anchors when the mall opened in 1972. The Northgate store is now a Belk.

Miller Inc. established one of the first stores in Oak Ridge during the Manhattan Project. The original Miller's store in Oak Ridge was established in 1944 on Broadway. The store later relocated to the Downtown Shopping Center, which was renovated into Oak Ridge Mall between 1989 and 1991. Other Knoxville area branch locations included East Towne Mall, West Town Mall, and the Foothills Mall in Maryville.

Tri-Cities locations included Fort Henry Mall in Kingsport, The Mall at Johnson City in Johnson City, and Bristol Mall in Bristol, Virginia. Prior to moving to the Fort Henry Mall, the Kingsport store was located at 300 Broad Street. The downtown store was purchased from J. Fred Johnson Company and the two-story building contained the first escalator in Kingsport.

Miller's had Georgia locations in Athens, and in Rome, which began as a multi-level downtown store and then moved to Rome's Riverbend Mall in 1975.
