= Blue Boar Cafeterias =

Defunct cafeteria chain in the Southern United States

Blue Boar Cafeterias was a chain of cafeteria-style restaurants based in Louisville, Kentucky. The first Blue Boar was opened in 1931. Once a major presence in metro Louisville, it is still remembered for its old downtown location on Fourth Avenue near Broadway. During the 1930s, Guion (Guyon) Clement Earle (1870–1940) served as advertising manager. He was the brother-in-law of Frank Kennicott Reilly (1863–1932), owner of the Reilly & Lee publishing firm of Chicago. Mr. Earle was well known to the customers of the Blue Boar Restaurant for the witty jottings he created, which appeared on the restaurant's menus. A decade earlier, Mr. Earle had served as the Superintendent of Loveman, Joseph & Loeb in Birmingham, Alabama, where he published a literary review entitled "The Bookworm".

== Early history ==
The Blue Boar chain was founded by Alva Wright Boswell Johnson, owner of the Britling Cafeterias chain with locations in Birmingham, Alabama, and Memphis, Tennessee. Johnson intended to open another Britling location in Louisville, only to learn that a Britling Cafe already existed in the city, leading him to come up with a new name that also started with a B. The first Blue Boar Cafeteria opened at 644 South Fourth Street on April 28, 1931.

In addition to Britling and Blue Boar, Johnson's chains included B&W Cafeterias in Nashville. Blue Boar was the last of these chains to close. At one point, there were 21 Blue Boar locations in Louisville, Lexington, Memphis, Nashville, Little Rock, and Cleveland.

As with its corporate siblings, Blue Boar was a Louisville institution, best known for its downtown flagship location.

In 1961, Blue Boar locations were targeted for sit-in protests in the civil rights movement to fight institutionalized racism in the United States. A historic marker has since been installed at the former location at 410 W. Walnut Street (now renamed Muhammad Ali Boulevard) as part of Louisville's downtown "Civil Rights Trail".

The company expanded into suburban locations in the 1960s and 1970s, including a location in "The Mall", now called the Mall St. Matthews, which was the first enclosed shopping mall in the state. (This cafeteria later moved to Oxmoor Center, a newer mall just across the Watterson Expressway.) Another location was in the city of Shively, in the Southland Terrace shopping area, which was located on 7th Street Rd.

There was also a Blue Boar cafeteria located on Euclid Avenue in downtown Cleveland in the 1930s. It is unclear whether there was any connection between that location and the Louisville company. According to one source, it was patterned after Louisville's Blue Boar.

== Decline ==
Facing increased competition from fast food outlets and changing lifestyles, the chain declined and gradually closed down. Many of its locations were near locally owned department stores, and faltered after those stores closed. In 1995, the chain closed its last remaining location outside of Louisville, in Lexington's Turfland Mall and in Clarksville, Indiana. It also closed its Gardiner Lane Shopping Center store in 1995, which had been open since 1959. After 1995, only four locations remained open. One of the final locations, in a shopping center at the intersection of Eastern Parkway and Preston Highway, closed in 1999.

The last location in Louisville, in the Southland Terrace shopping center, closed on July 27, 2003. Unlike Britling, it had stayed with the cafeteria format rather than converting to an all-you-can-eat buffet format.
