= Loveman's =

Loveman's may refer to:

- Loveman's (Chattanooga), a Chattanooga, Tennessee-based chain of department stores
- Loveman's (Nashville), also known as Loveman, Berger & Teitelbaum, a Nashville, Tennessee-based full service department store
- Loveman's of Alabama, a Birmingham, Alabama-based chain of department stores with locations across Alabama
