= Loveman =

Loveman is a surname. Notable people with the surname include:

- Gary Loveman (born 1960), American chief executive
- Robert Loveman (1864–1923), American poet
- Samuel Loveman (1887–1976), American poet, critic, and dramatist

== See also ==
- David Bernard Loveman Noa (1878–1901), United States Navy officer
- Loveman's (disambiguation), multiple American department store chains
