= Britling Cafeterias =

Former restaurant chain

- Industry: Cafeteria-style restaurants
- Founded: July 10, 1919; 106 years ago in Birmingham, Alabama, U.S.
- Founder: A. W. B. Johnson
- Defunct: March 28, 1993; 33 years ago
- Fate: Defunct
- Area served: Birmingham, Alabama; Nashville, Tennessee; Louisville, Kentucky
- Divisions: Blue Boar Cafeterias

Britling Cafeterias was a chain of cafeteria-style restaurants, originating in Birmingham, Alabama. During the late 1920s, Britling opened three cafeterias in downtown Birmingham, Alabama. The Britling chain in Memphis, along with B&W Cafeterias in Nashville, Tennessee and Blue Boar Cafeterias in Louisville, Kentucky, were under common ownership in their latter years. All have now closed.

== History ==
The company was founded by Alva Wright Boswell Johnson, who moved to Birmingham in 1908 to take over operation of a local department store, Steele-Smith Dry Goods Company. Johnson opened a cafeteria on the top floor of the store for employees to eat their lunches, but the food became exceedingly popular with the general public. Seeing a future as a restaurateur, Johnson sold the store and opened the first Britling Cafeteria at 1913 First Avenue North in Birmingham on July 10, 1919. He took the company's name from the protagonist of H. G. Wells' 1916 novel Mr. Britling Sees It Through. Two other locations in downtown Birmingham opened during the 1920s.

In 1928, Johnson moved from Birmingham to Memphis and began to open additional Britling Cafeteria locations there. He planned to open another in Louisville, Kentucky, in 1931, only to find that the city already had a Britling Cafe, named for the same literary character. The Louisville location instead became the first in the chain of Blue Boar Cafeterias, as Johnson sought another name beginning with B. Around 1930, the Birmingham cafeteria was taken over by First National Bank due to financial hardship, with John H. Holcomb later buying the Birmingham operation from the bank. Johnson continued to own the locations in Memphis until his death in 1948.

In their heyday, the Britling cafeterias were local institutions in Birmingham and Memphis, particularly the earlier downtown locations. The First Avenue North location in Birmingham was a popular gathering spot in the late 1940s and 1950s, even featuring live music. The Twentieth St. North location featured seating on a balcony overlooking the main floor and was also connected to the Third Avenue North cafeteria; the two downtown Memphis cafeterias were similar. After-church Sunday afternoon lunches at Britling's were a tradition in both cities.

Employees at the Memphis cafeterias included Gladys Presley, who worked there to support her son Elvis. A display at Graceland memorializes the Britling Cafeteria and her work there.

There was also a Britling Cafeteria located at 221 W. 1st Street (Park Ave.) in Oklahoma City also utilized the multilevel balcony seating format. This location, which opened in December 1932, closed in 1948, with its kitchen equipment sold to the local American Legion ladies' auxiliary. The building that housed the Britling was demolished as a result of Oklahoma City's failed urban renewal program in the early 1960s.

Both chains declined in the 1970s, as fast food restaurants became increasingly popular and widespread. In both cities, the Britling management tried to counter this trend by expanding into suburban locations, a move that was successful for a time. In Birmingham, the chain opened locations on Highland Avenue, in Mountain Brook, and in popular shopping centers such as Eastwood Mall, Western Hills Mall, Vestavia Hills Mall, and Five Points West Shopping City. A location was also opened in Huntsville. These eventually became the only locations, as the three original downtown restaurants were closed by the end of the 1970s. The Memphis management tried the same diversification, with several locations in suburban shopping centers eventually replacing the downtown restaurants. As the two companies struggled against the competition, the remaining cafeterias were converted into all-you-can-eat buffets; this was done with at least three Memphis locations and the one remaining Birmingham-area store in Hoover. The measure was only successful in the short term. Two Birmingham Britlings finally closed or sold off their Birmingham and Huntsville locations.

Around 1975, Thomas Battle, the manager of a Britling Cafeteria, and J. W. Palmer bought partial ownership of the Alabama locations from John Holcomb Jr., later buying the rest from Holcomb's sisters. By 1980, Battle and Palmer had sold all but one of the cafeterias to new owners who reopened them under different names, including Battle himself, who converted the Hoover location into a new restaurant called Battle's Buffet. The last location in the Birmingham area, at Western Hills Mall, was said by Battle to be doing "excellent business" in October 1980, but was closed by March 1981 due to economic reasons. The Huntsville location was sold to Battle's son Tommy Battle and was allowed to keep the Britling name. This final location in Dunnavant's Mall closed on March 14, 1993, so that the mall could be converted into clinic space for the Huntsville Hospital System.

The Memphis locations continued to operate as a division of Johnson's company Blue Boar Cafeterias. Coincidentally, the last two Britling Cafeterias in Memphis lasted two weeks longer than the final location in Alabama, closing on March 28, 1993. A Britling-branded cafeteria inside the Internal Revenue Service Memphis regional offices continued to operate after this date, but it was not open to the public.
