= Stephen D. Lebovitz =

American businessman

- Born: c. 1962
- Education: Stanford University; Harvard Business School
- Occupation: Business executive
- Known for: CEO & president of CBL & Associates Properties
- Spouse: Lisa Lebovitz
- Children: 4
- Parent: Charles B. Lebovitz

Stephen D. Lebovitz (born c. 1962) is an American businessman. He is the chief executive officer and president of CBL & Associates Properties.

== Early life ==
Stephen D. Lebovitz was born circa 1962. His father, Charles B. Lebovitz, was a co-founder of CBL & Associates Properties, and was its chairman.

Lebovitz graduated from Stanford University, where he earned a bachelor of arts degree in Political Science. He earned a master in business administration from the Harvard Business School in 1988.

== Career ==
Lebovitz began his career at Goldman Sachs, where he worked from 1984 to 1986.

Lebovitz joined his family business, CBL & Associates Properties, in 1988. He was appointed a president in 1999, and chief executive officer in 2010. He was the chairman of the International Council of Shopping Centers from 2015 to 2016.

== Personal life ==
Lebovitz has a wife, Lisa, and four children. They reside in Weston, Massachusetts.
