= Riverbend Mall =

Shopping mall in Rome, Georgia, United States

- Coordinates: 34°14′59″N 85°09′50″W
- Opened: September 18, 1975; 51 years ago
- Closed: 2002
- Developer: A. W. Ledbetter Jr. and Robert H. Ledbetter
- Num. of stores: 0 (originally 31)
- Num. of anchor tenants: 0 (originally 3)
- Floor area: At least 250,000 square feet (23,000 m^{2})
- Floors: 1

Riverbend Mall was a shopping mall located in Rome, Georgia. It was open from 1975 to 2002, when it was demolished and replaced with a strip mall. The mall was built by the Ledbetter family, local developers that continue to own the property it sits on today.

The Mall was the scene of a notorious kidnapping on September 25, 1982, of thirteen-year-old Lisa Ann Millican, by sexual predators Alvin and Judith Neelley. Millican was subsequently murdered by the Neelleys.

== Early history ==
At its peak, the mall contained three anchors: Belk Rhodes, Miller Brothers, and J. C. Penney. All three anchors were only one story and the JCPenney was one of the smallest in the chain. Other stores in the mall included a Revco Drug (later CVS), Morrison's Cafeteria, Circus World (later KB Toys), GNC, Riverbend Cinema, World Bazaar, Walden Books, Martin's Men's Wear, Dollar Tree, Faye's Hallmark, Briar Patch, King & Queen Salon, The Fun Tunnel, Chick-fil-a, FATS BBQ, and Baskin-Robbins. In 1986, the anchors of the mall were rearranged when Miller Brothers was converted to Hess's, a major Mid-Atlantic department store chain that was sold to Proffitt's in 1992.

== Expansion ==
The mall was expanded in 1988 to include a food court. The Belk Rhodes design was typical of that era, with burnt orange carpet and earthtones. The Belk Rhodes and Miller's stores were both designed by Stevens & Wilkinson, who also designed the Rich's and Richway stores in the Atlanta area.

== Flooding and closure ==
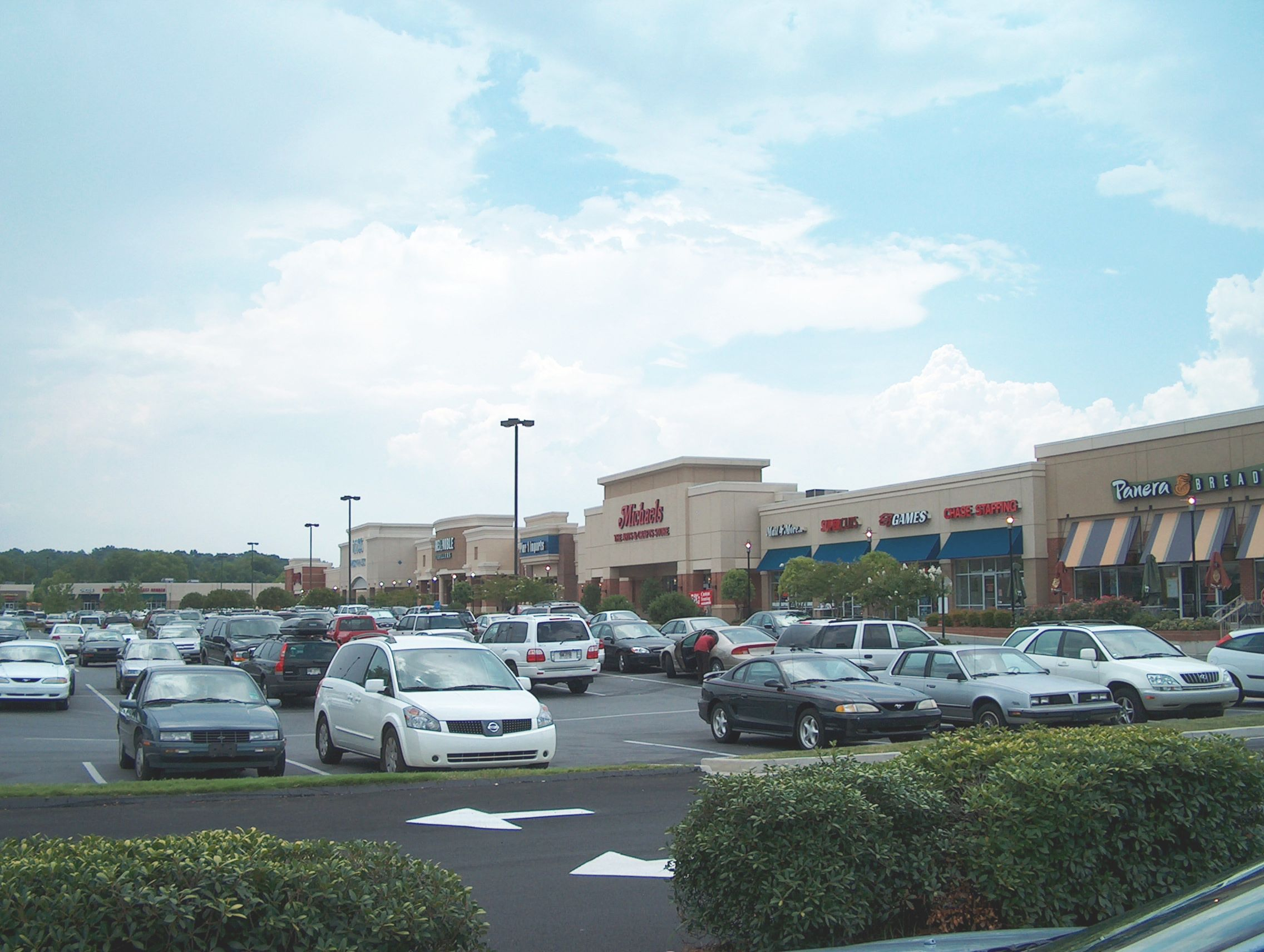
New Riverbend Mall

In January 1990, the Etowah River rose up and flooded the mall. This prompted the closure and major cleanup of the mall. The flooding destroyed public perception, and the mall was even nicknamed the "brown mall" over the brown limestone texture of it combined with the brown water from the flood. After the cleanup, the anchors stores left when another mall, Mount Berry Square, opened to the north. The Bon-Ton, a chain based out of York, Pennsylvania, having purchased the former Miller's/Hess's in 1993, took that space, and Belk Rhodes briefly operated half of their former space as an outlet. The Bon-Ton there was the only known Georgia location and closed a short time after anchoring the center. The other half became an office for the Coosa Medical Group. By 2000, Ford's Furniture was the last full anchor to the mall, occupying the former Miller's/Hess's. A few of the last remaining stores included The Comic Stop, Dive Shop, and Knight's Jewelers. The mall was closed and demolished in 2002. The site was redeveloped as a strip mall with a Kroger grocery store, a Barnes & Noble, Ross Dress For Less, and a new Coosa Medical Group building on the south side of the former site. The original Belk Rhodes building still stands as a medical office building, the only part of the original structure to escape demolition.

== See also ==
- Dead mall
