= Eastgate Towne Center =

Eastgate Mall
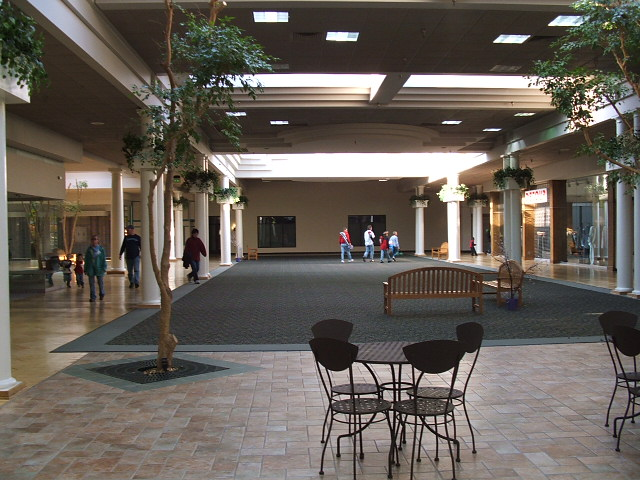
- Interior view of Eastgate Mall
- Location: Chattanooga, Tennessee, United States
- Coordinates: 35.008474°N 85.21429°W
- Opened: 1962
- Owner: Eastgate Town Center LLC
- Floors: 1

Eastgate Towne Center, formerly known as Eastgate Mall is an enclosed office and retail complex in Chattanooga, Tennessee.

== History ==
Eastgate was developed by Independent Enterprises, a precursor of today's CBL & Associates. The open-air shopping venue was built on the site of a former drive-in theater, which was owned by Independent Enterprises.

The complex was designed by Toombs, Amisano & Wells. Originally known as Eastgate Center, it began construction in September 1961 and was completed in August 1962. At the time, the center was anchored by a 2 floor 60,000 square feet (5,600 m^{2}) Miller Brothers store and had a Winn-Dixie grocery store, as well as a Morrison's Cafeteria location. A second construction phase, finished in 1965, added a single-screen cinema, and two more anchors: Loveman's and JCPenney. At the time, the total leasable square footage of the mall was some 550,000 square feet (51,000 m^{2}), making it the largest shopping mall in Tennessee for a time. This was later followed by a food court, which included Baskin Robbins, Mr. Cookie, Glen Gene Deli, Chocolate Sunday, A&W Hot Dogs & More, Burger King, Chick-fil-A, Chinese Combo King, and Cozzolis.

A commercial competitor, Northgate Mall, opened for business in March 1972. This, plus the need to do repairs after a damaging fire in 1971, initiated a move to fully enclose the older shopping center, which would then be known as Eastgate Mall. Loveman's later became Proffitt's in 1986, while Miller Brothers became Hess's during the same year. A Sears Outlet was also added as a freestanding structure. The three department stores remained in the mall until the late 1980s, with Proffitt's remaining in the former Loveman's until 1992. Eastgate was also the home of two local radio stations from the late 1980s to the late 1990s. WBDX 102.7 housed its studios in small glass box in the middle of the mall, and then later in a 10 by 10 feet (3.0 by 3.0 m) room with windows that faced the walkway in the center of the mall until they moved to the old WJRX studio on Ringgold Road in East Ridge in 1998. WFXS 102.3 also had their studios in the mall and shared office space with WBDX from 1993 until 1996, when they moved to their current home at 821 Pineville Road on Moccasin Bend.

== Today ==
From circa 1990 to the present day, the Eastgate facility has undergone many changes, including a cosmetic restoration and a name change from Eastgate Mall to Eastgate Town Center. For example, the Baskin Robbins in the food court was gone by 1994. Though a shadow of its former self, Eastgate is still trying to find a way to survive. In fact, since its last change of ownership in late 2005, Eastgate has gone through a major and extensive conversion to attempt to become a trendy town center once again. Eastgate is a mixed-use facility with some large offices being occupied by various entities of different sectors. Eastgate Town Center houses various agencies of the State of Tennessee, two satellite college campuses, a Concentrix (formerly Convergys) call center, as well as medical and insurance administration offices. 74% of Eastgate's space is currently occupied.

Eastgate is located on Brainerd Road, a major artery connecting Westside and Eastside Chattanooga and can be accessed by Chattanooga Area Regional Transportation Authority (CARTA) bus route #4. This redevelopment has been touted as a success with many recognizable names such as Chattanooga State Community College, Merastar, and many state agencies as tenants. Eastgate is now the location of the county's One Stop Career Center, Department of Children's Services office, and the office of the Department of Human Services. The Partnership for Families, Children, and Adults maintains its Elder Services office here as well. Additionally, a Senior Citizens' Activity Center is located within the former mall.

Blue Cross relocated to their new downtown facility in 2009, leaving a large portion of the facility unoccupied.

The current plan for Eastgate is to develop it into a new "downtown" type streetscape.

Records
Preceded by	Largest mall in Tennessee; 1965–1968	Succeeded by 100 Oaks Mall; Nashville, Tennessee
