= Cafeteria =

Food service location in which there is little or no waiting staff table service

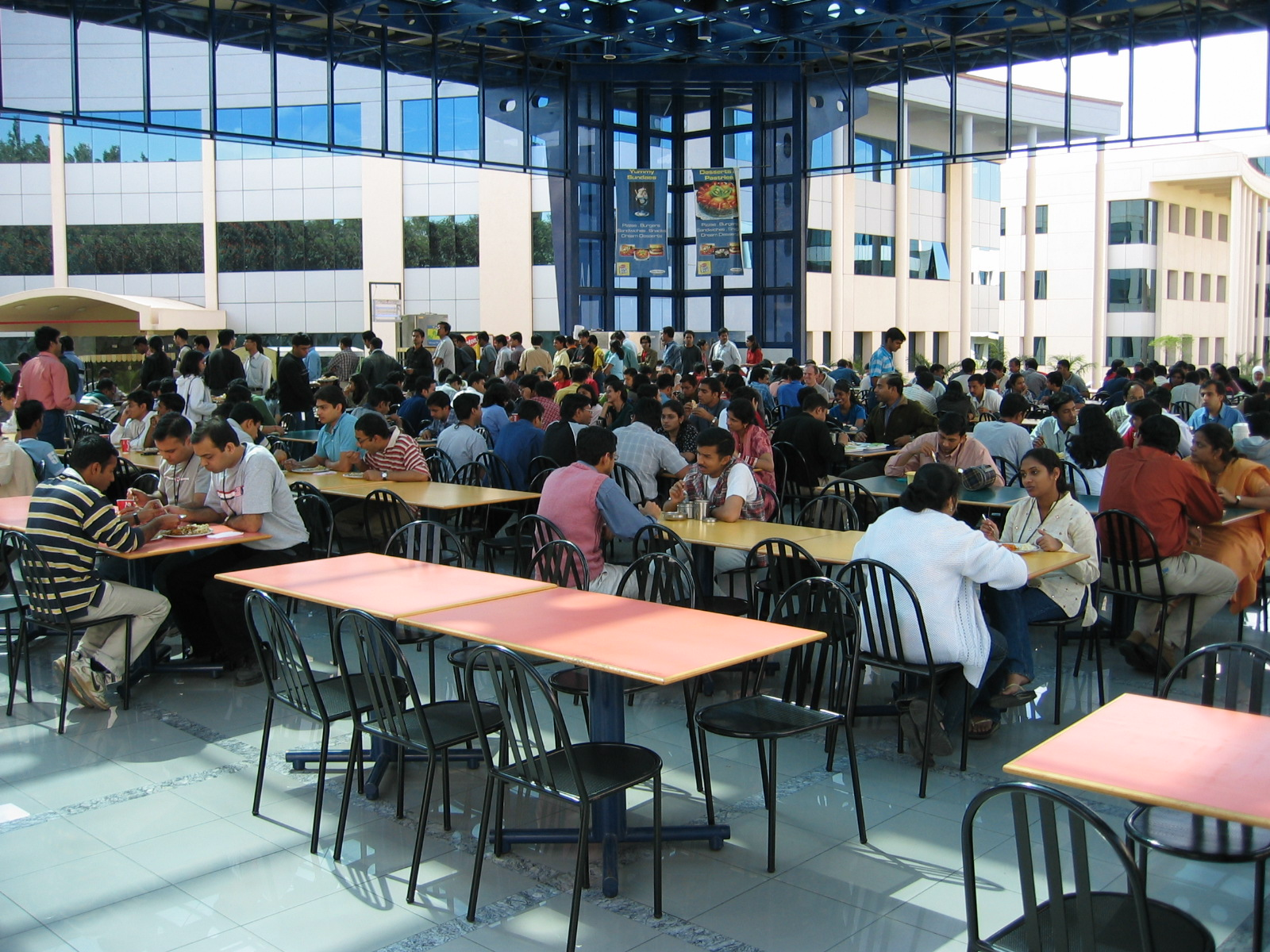
A corporate office's cafeteria in Bengaluru, India, December 2003.

A cafeteria, sometimes called a canteen outside North America, is a type of food service location in which there is no waiting staff table service. Cafeterias are different from coffeehouses, although the English term came from the Spanish term cafetería, which carries the same meaning.

Instead of table service, there are food-serving counters/stalls, or booths, either in a line or allowing free movement. Customers take the food that they desire as they walk along, placing it on a tray. In addition, there are often stations where customers order food, particularly items such as hamburgers or tacos.

Customers are either charged a flat rate for admission (as in a buffet) or pay at check-out for each item. Some self-service cafeterias charge by the weight of items on a customer's plate. In universities and colleges, some students pay by making a single large payment for the entire academic term.

== Food service management companies ==
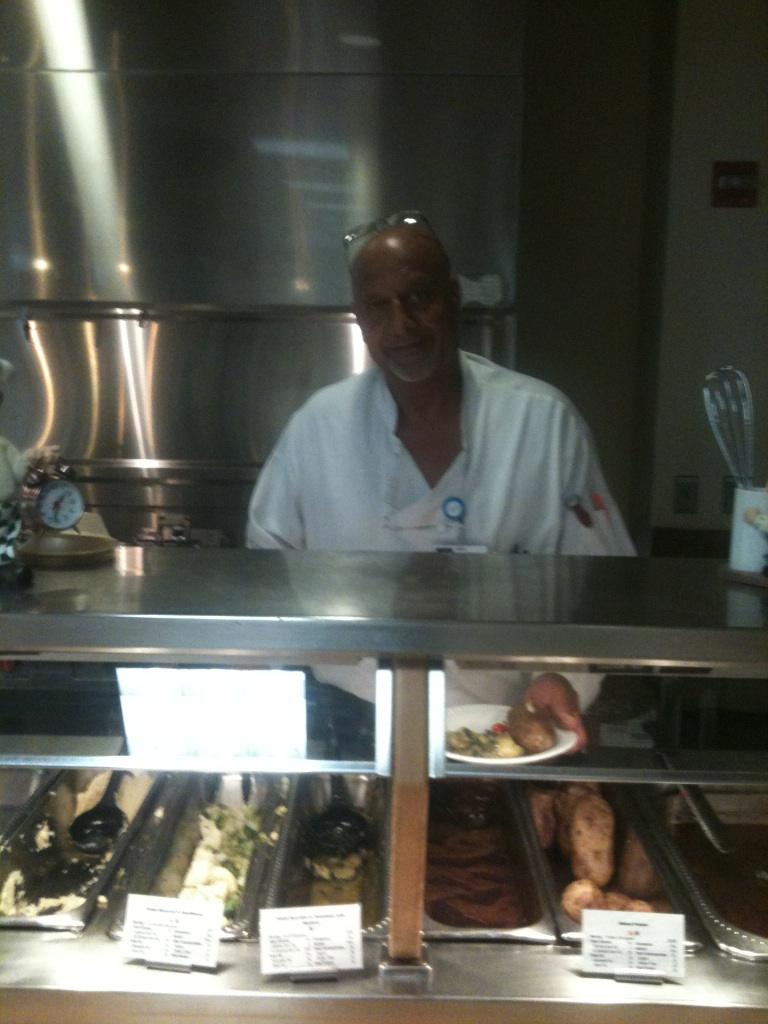
Hospital cafeteria tray line server in Port Charlotte, Florida

Because cafeterias require few employees, they are often found within larger institutions, catering to the employees or clientele of those institutions. Schools, residence halls, hospitals, military bases, prisons, factories, and office buildings often have cafeterias.

Although some institutions operate their cafeterias in-house, many outsource them to a food service management company or lease space to independent businesses to operate food service facilities. The three largest food service management companies servicing institutions are Aramark, Compass Group, and Sodexo.

== History ==
Perhaps the first self-service restaurant (not necessarily a cafeteria) in the U.S. was the Exchange Buffet in New York City, which opened September 4, 1885, and catered to an exclusively male clientele. Food was purchased at a counter, and patrons ate standing up. This represents the predecessor of two formats: the cafeteria, described below, and the automat.

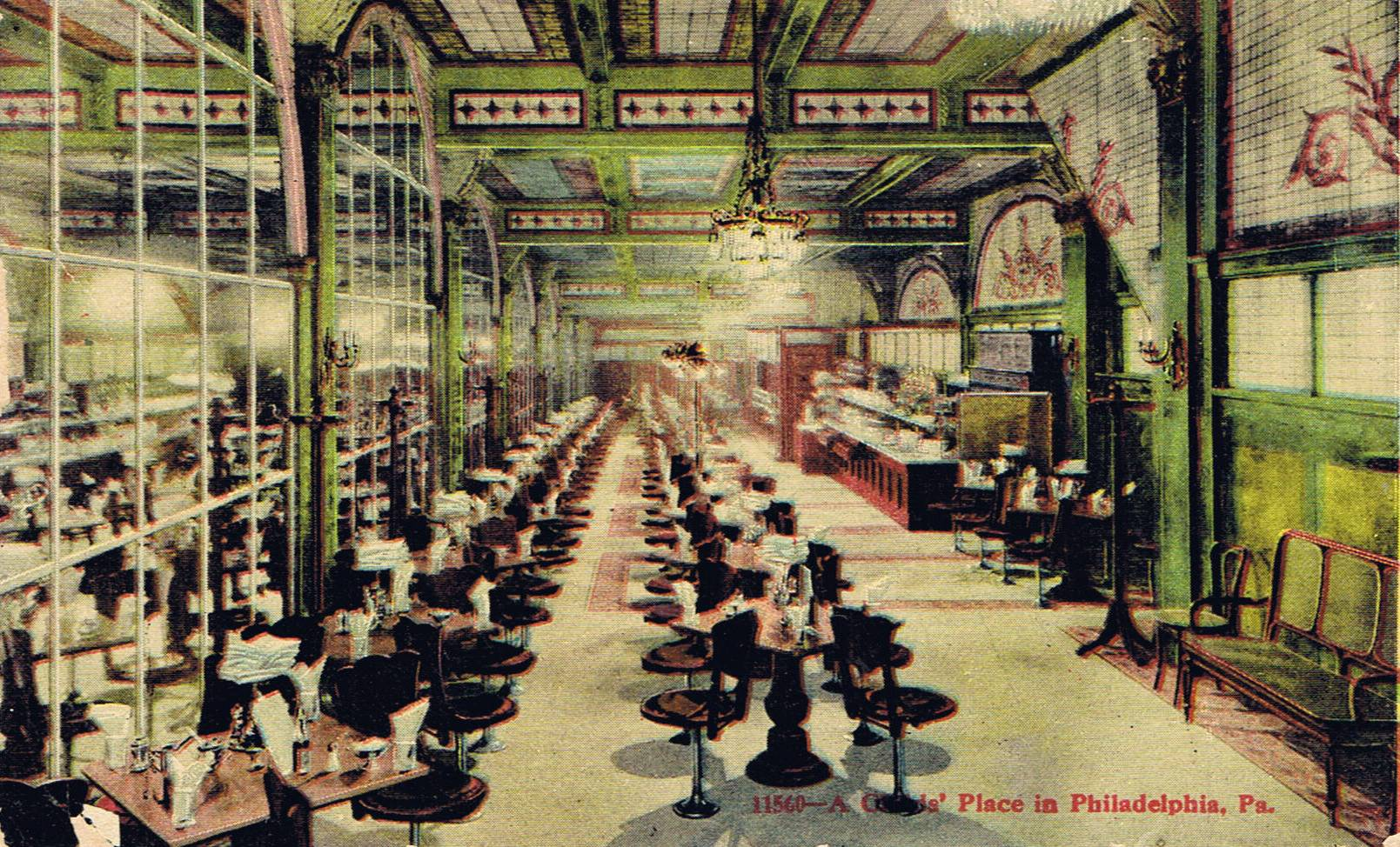
Childs Restaurant circa 1908 Philadelphia, PA

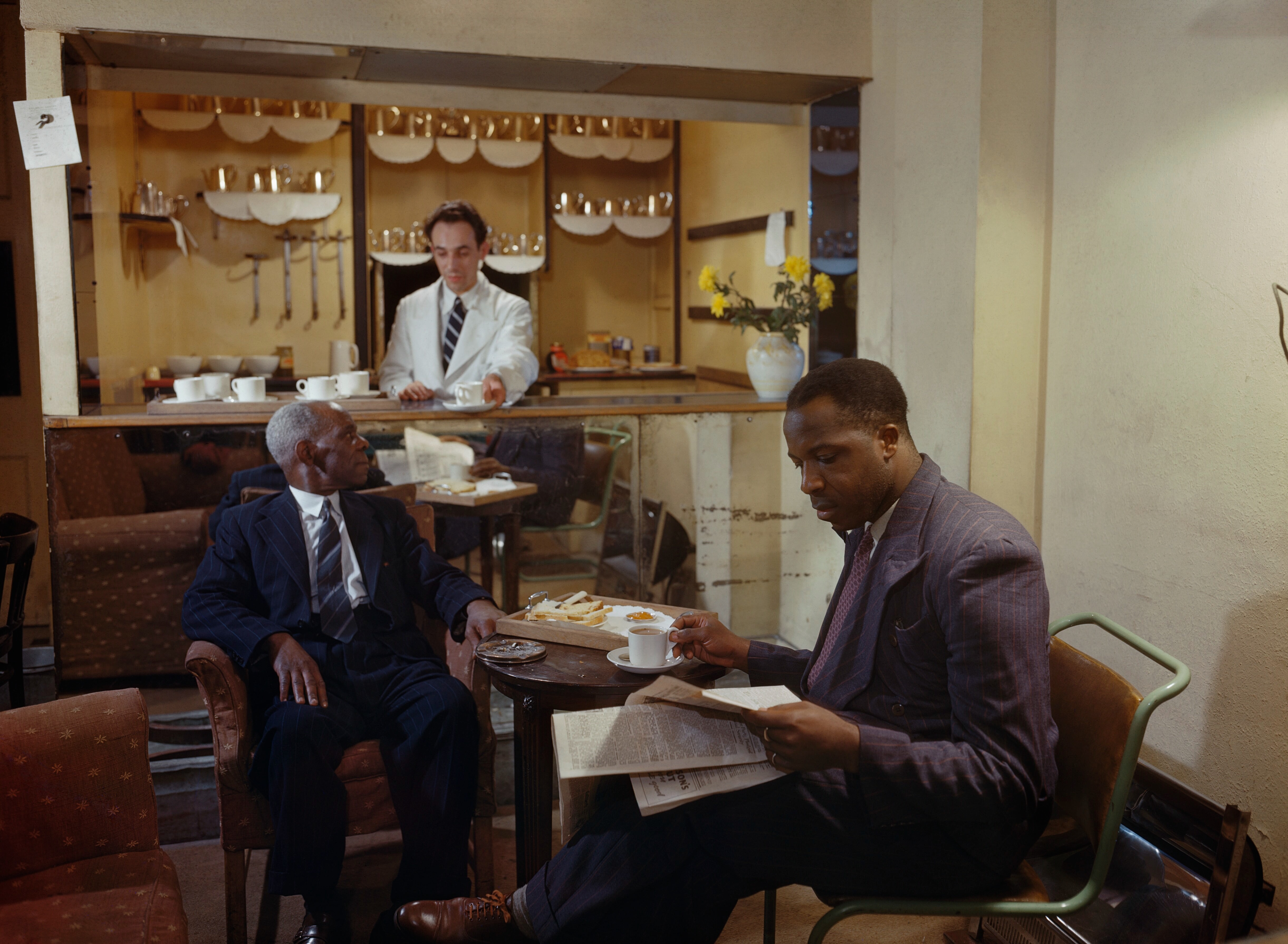
Two men in a canteen at a rest centre in England, 1944

During the 1893 World's Columbian Exposition in Chicago, entrepreneur John Kruger built an American version of the smörgåsbord he had seen while traveling in Sweden. Emphasizing the simplicity and light fare, he called it the 'Cafeteria' - Spanish for "coffee shop". The exposition attracted over 27 million visitors (half the U.S. population at the time) in six months, and it was because of Kruger's operation that the United States first heard the term and experienced the self-service dining format.

Meanwhile, the chain of Childs Restaurants quickly grew from about 10 locations in New York City in 1890 to hundreds across the U.S. and Canada by 1920. Childs is credited with the innovation of adding trays and a "tray line" to the self-service format, which was introduced in 1898 at its 130 Broadway location. Childs did not change its format of sit-down dining, however. This soon became the standard design for most Childs Restaurants and, ultimately, the dominant method for successful cafeterias.

It has been conjectured that the 'cafeteria craze' in the United States started in May 1905, when Helen Mosher opened a downtown L.A. restaurant where people chose their food at a long counter and carried their trays to their tables. California has a long history in the cafeteria format - notably the Boos Brothers Cafeterias, and the Clifton's Cafeteria and Schaber's. The earliest cafeterias in California were opened at least 12 years after Kruger's Cafeteria, and Childs already had many locations around the country. Horn & Hardart, an automat format chain (different from cafeterias), was well established in the mid-Atlantic region before 1900.

By the 1960s, cafeteria-style restaurant chains dominated the culture of the Southern United States, and to a lesser extent, the Southwest and Midwest. There were numerous prominent chains, many of which (such as S&W Cafeteria, Furr's, and Wyatt's Cafeteria) closed in the 1980s, 1990s, and early 2000s due to competition from fast food chains, all-you-can-eat buffets and other casual dining establishments.

At the peak of the American cafeteria industry, many smaller chains likewise existed, sometimes located in and around a single city. The majority of these, such as Britling Cafeterias and Blue Boar Cafeterias, closed in the late 20th century. Southern California-based Clifton's Cafeteria closed its penultimate location in 2003 and its final location in 2018. After entering restructuring in 2021, K&W Cafeterias closed all of its locations in December 2025.

Two major American cafeteria chains continue to operate on a smaller scale: Piccadilly in the southeast and Luby's in Texas. Another, Morrison's Cafeteria, survives as a single, Piccadilly-owned location in Mobile, Alabama, and a fourth, Bickford's in New England, converted to a non-cafeteria chain and closed all but one restaurant.

Existing examples of smaller chains include MCL Restaurant & Bakery, with locations in Illinois, Indiana, and Ohio; S&S Cafeterias, in Georgia and South Carolina; Niki's in Birmingham, Alabama (one location remains); and the Jewish deli-style cafeteria Manny's in Chicago, Illinois (one location remains).

Outside the United States, the development of cafeterias can be observed in France as early as 1881 with the passing of the Ferry Law. This law mandated that public school education be available to all children. Accordingly, the government also encouraged schools to provide meals for students in need, leading to the establishment of cafeterias or canteens (in French). According to Abramson, before the creation of cafeterias, only some students could bring home-cooked meals and be properly fed in schools.

As cafeterias in France became more popular, their use spread beyond schools and into the workforce. Thus, due to pressure from workers and eventually new labor laws, sizable businesses had to, at a minimum, provide established eating areas for their workers. Support for this practice was also reinforced by the effects of World War II, when the importance of national health and nutrition came under scrutiny.

== Other names ==
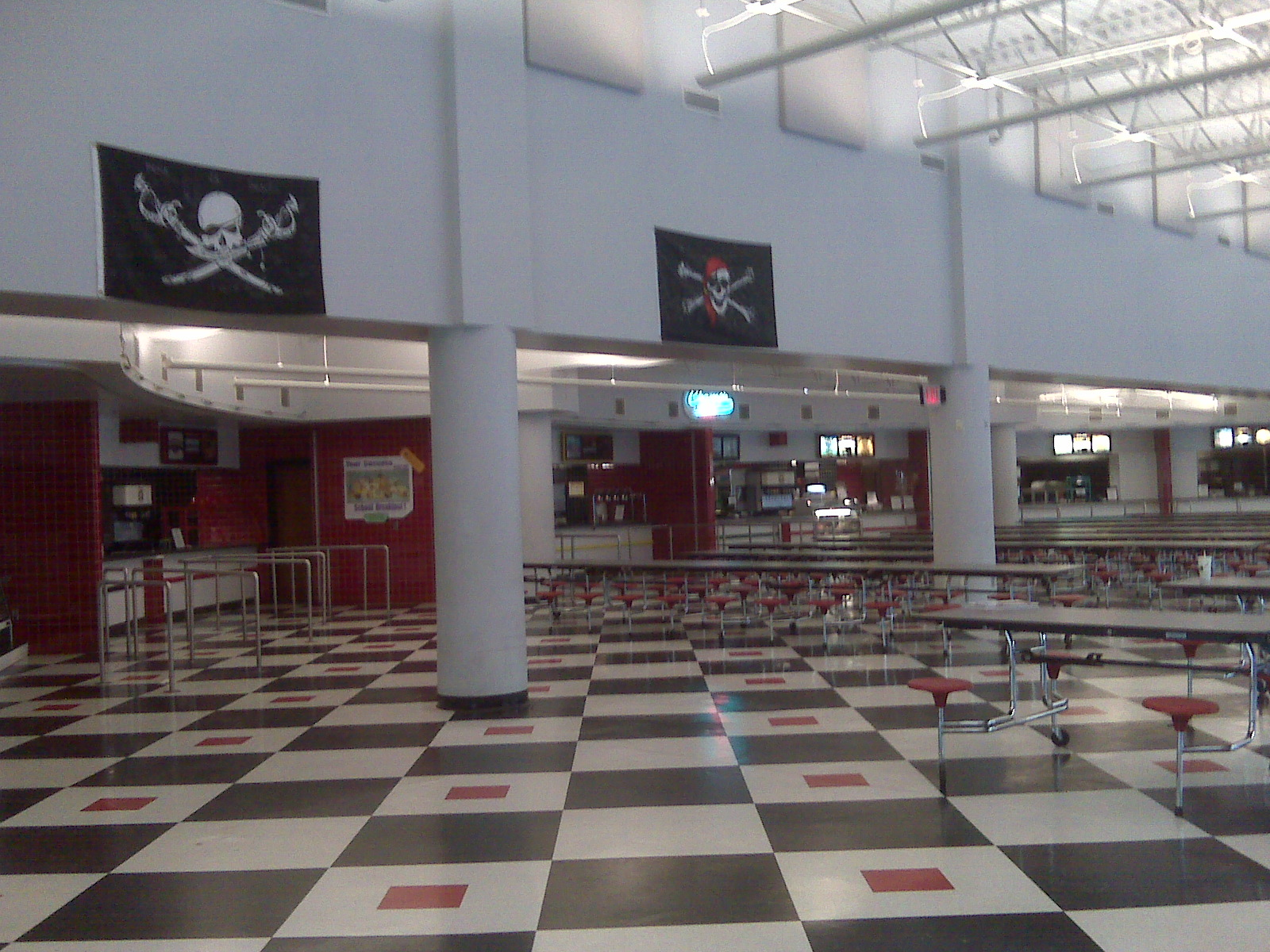
Food court style cafeteria in Port Charlotte High School

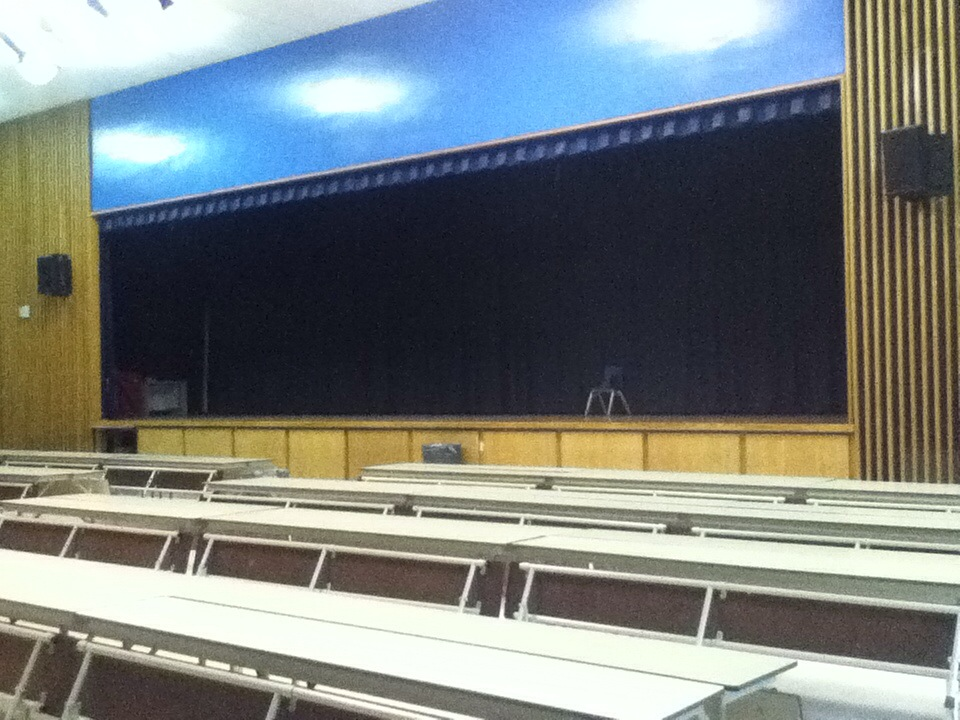
A cafetorium of St. Joan of Arc Catholic Academy in Toronto, Ontario, Canada

Cafeterias serving university dormitories are sometimes called dining halls or dining commons. A food court is a type of cafeteria found in many shopping malls and airports featuring multiple food vendors or concessions. However, a food court could equally be styled as a type of restaurant, being more aligned with the public rather than institutionalized dining. Some institutions, especially schools, have food courts with stations offering different types of food served by the institution itself (self-operation) or a single contract management company, rather than leasing space to numerous businesses. Some monasteries, boarding schools, and older universities refer to their cafeteria as a refectory. Modern-day seminaries, convents and abbeys, notably in the Church of England and Catholic Church, often use the phrase refectory to describe a cafeteria open to the public. Historically, the refectory was generally only used by monks and priests. For example, although the original 800-year-old refectory at Gloucester Cathedral (the stage setting for dining scenes in the Harry Potter movies) is now mostly used as a choir practice area, the relatively modern 300-year-old extension, now used as a cafeteria by staff and public alike, is today referred to as the refectory.

== College cafeteria ==
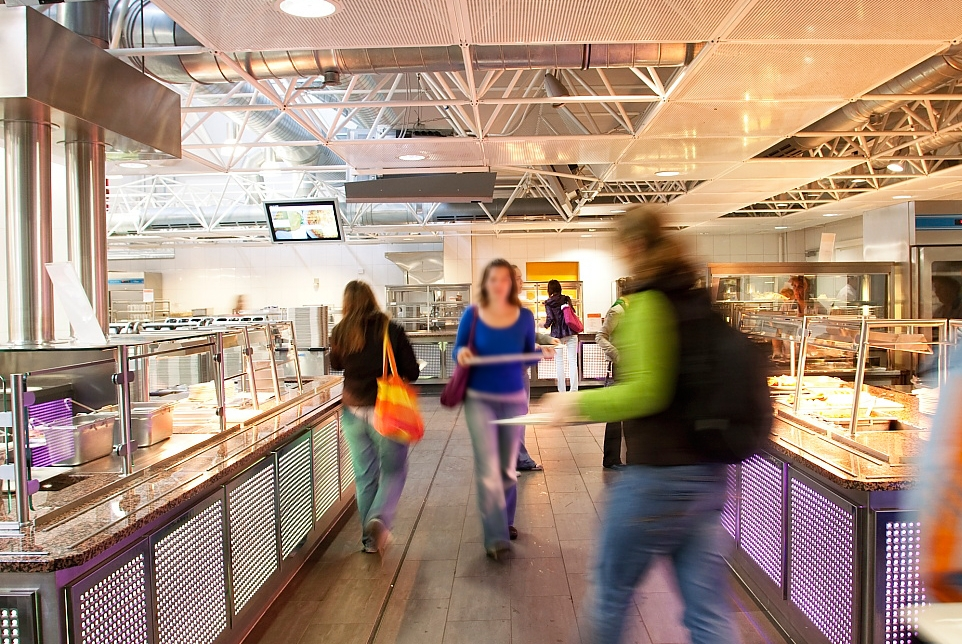
Cafeteria at Heinrich Heine University Düsseldorf in Germany

In American English, a college cafeteria is a cafeteria intended for college students. In British English, it is often called the refectory. These cafeterias can be a part of a residence hall or in a separate building. Many of these colleges employ their students to work in the cafeteria. The number of meals served to students varies from school to school, but is normally around 21 meals per week. As in normal cafeterias, a person will have a tray to select the food they want, but (at some campuses) instead of paying at the time, they pay in advance by purchasing a meal plan.

The method of payment for college cafeterias is commonly a meal plan, whereby the patron pays a set amount at the start of the semester, and the plan details are stored in a computer system. Student ID cards are then used to access the meal plan. Meal plans can vary widely in their details and are often unnecessary for eating at a college cafeteria. Typically, the college tracks students' plan usage by counting predefined meal servings, points, dollars, or buffet dinners. The plan may give the student a certain number of any of the above per week or semester, and they may or may not roll over to the next week or semester.

== See also ==
- Automat
- Coffee service
- Coffeehouse
- Food court
- Hawker centre
- List of cafeterias
- Mess
- Refectory
