= Louis Saks =

Louis Saks (commonly Saks) was a department store owned by Louis Saks which operated in Downtown Birmingham, Alabama from the 1880s until the 1920s.

The original location of Saks' store was at 1906 2nd Avenue North. In 1895 he moved to a three-story brick building on the northeast corner of 1st Avenue and 19th Street North. In 1899, shortly after an Anti-Spitting Law was placed in effect, Saks set out large spittoons on the sidewalk outside his store, painted with the slogan "We provide for the Public. Louis Saks, the clothier."

That building was heavily damaged by a fire that broke out shortly after midnight on June 22, 1910. At the time the loss was estimated at over $200,000. The adjoining Spielberger Brothers store was also damaged. After a "fire sale" the building was rebuilt and continued to serve the store until it relocated to larger quarters in 1916.

The 1916 Louis Saks building was built on the former site of the Florence Hotel, a block away, on the northwest corner of 19th Street and 2nd Avenue North. The new 6-story building reflected the latest in Chicago-style retail architecture. The result was a well-proportioned frame building with ganged window bays above and large display windows at ground level.

This store became Melancon's and, in 1936, a J. J. Newberry's variety store. Newberry's closed in 1995, and the building was demolished in 1996 for construction of the McWane Science Center's IMAX Dome theater.
