= Foothills Mall (Tennessee) =

Coordinates: 35.746790°N 83.996986°W

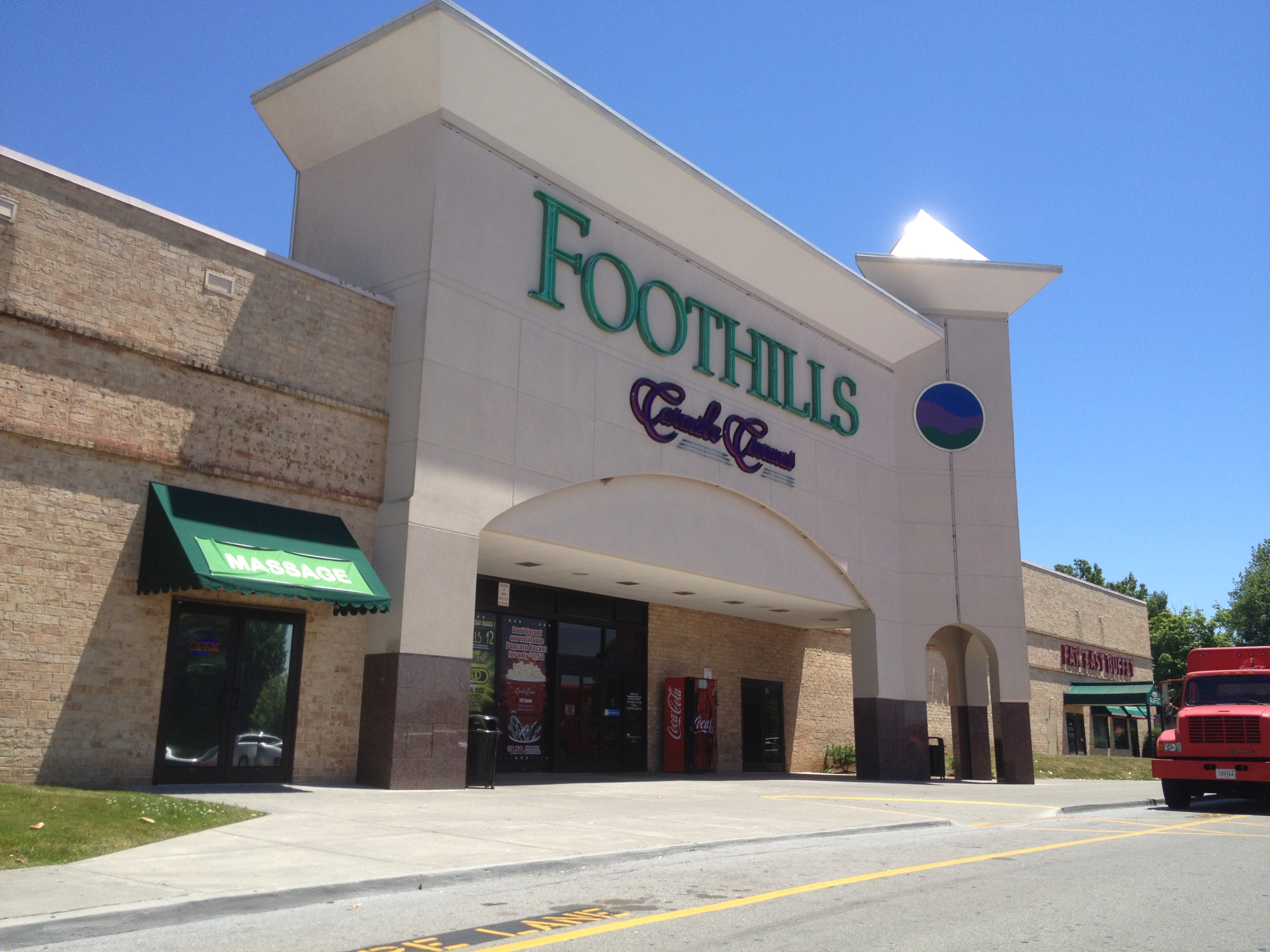
- Exterior view of Foothills Mall, May 2012
- Location: Maryville, Tennessee, United States
- Address: Junction of US 129 & US 411
- Opened: 1983
- Developer: CBL & Associates
- Manager: Urban Retail Properties
- Owner: Time Equities Inc.
- Num. of stores: 70 stores
- Num. of anchor tenants: 6 (5 open, 1 vacant)
- Floor area: 478,768 square feet (44,479.0 m^{2}) (GLA)
- Floors: 1
- Website: foothillsmall.com

Foothills Mall is an indoor regional shopping mall located in Maryville, Tennessee, United States. Foothills Mall features approximately 70 stores and restaurants. Adjacent to the mall is the Foothills Plaza complex which includes several additional restaurants and a Publix.

Opened in 1983, Foothills Mall is the only shopping mall in suburban Blount County, part of the Knoxville Metropolitan Area. The mall was originally anchored by Maryville-based Proffitt's, a regional department store; Miller's, another regional department store that was a division of Allied Stores; JCPenney; and Sears, which closed in February 2019. Proffitt's and Miller's no longer exist. The original Proffitt's space is now used by Belk, while the former Miller's/Hess's was demolished in 2011 to accommodate a new movie theater.

The mall was renovated in 2006.

On June 4, 2020, JCPenney announced that it would close in October 2020 as part of a plan to close 154 stores nationwide. After JCPenney closed, AMC Theatres, Belk, and TJ Maxx are the only remaining anchor stores left.

The old Sears building was demolished. In October 2023, a new grocery store known as Publix Super Market opened.

In 2025, BJ's Wholesale opened at the former JCPenney department store site. The entire building was demolished and rebuilt. Additions include a new BJ's Wholesale Gas Station and a BJ's Wholesale Auto Center.
