= Northgate Mall (Chattanooga, Tennessee) =

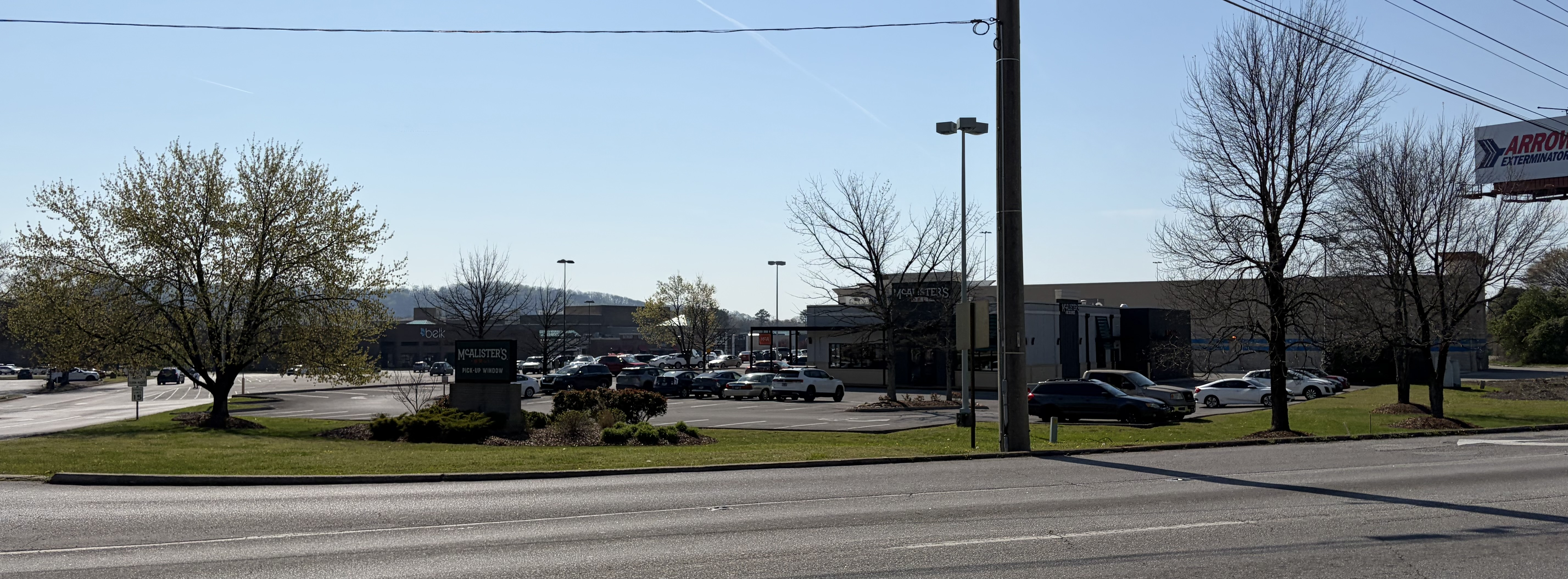
- Entrance to the mall from Hixson Pike
- Location: Chattanooga, Tennessee, United States
- Coordinates: 35.130°N 85.240°W
- Opened: March 15, 1972
- Developer: Arlen Shopping Center Group
- Manager: CBL & Associates Properties
- Owner: CBL & Associates Properties
- Num. of stores: 60
- Num. of anchor tenants: 3 (2 open, 1 vacant)
- Floor area: 820,000 square feet (76,180.5 m^{2})
- Floors: 1 (2 in former JCPenney)
- Parking: 4,500
- Website: visitnorthgatemall.com

Northgate Mall, also called Northgate, is an enclosed shopping mall in the Chattanooga, Tennessee suburb of Hixson. Opened on March 15, 1972, it was the second mall built in Chattanooga. Anchor stores are Belk and BJ’s Wholesale. There is one vacant anchor that used to be a JCPenney.

== History ==
Northgate Mall was built in 1972 on land originally intended for a drive-in movie theater by a predecessor to CBL & Associates Properties (CBL), Arlen Shopping Center Group. The mall was considered the northside competition to now-defunct Eastgate Mall and is now considered a sister property of CBL's Hamilton Place Mall. Northgate was later sold by Arlen, being renovated in 1991 and 1997, and eventually ended up with General Growth Properties (GGP) in 2000. After expanding Northgate between 2005 and 2008, GGP sold the mall to CBL for $11.5 million in September 2011.

A 14-screen movie theater, owned by AMC Theatres, opened in 2005. A new food court was proposed to go in where the Book Gallery is located, but it was never built.

On April 13, 2009, a woman was killed after her car crashed into the Sears building. The woman entered the Northgate Mall entrance from Highway 153. The vehicle jumped a curb and sped toward Sears, where it crashed into the southwest corner of the building. The crash left a 3 by 4 feet (0.91 by 1.22 m) hole in the wall of the shoe storage area of the department store.

In early 2013, Northgate underwent a planned multimillion-dollar major renovation, including new flooring, ceiling and lighting upgrades, and repainting, which were completed by Christmas 2013. A 70,000 square feet (6,503.2 m^{2}) associated center, which is located directly across from Northgate's main entrance and has T.J. Maxx and added Ross Dress for Less, Michael's Arts & Crafts, and a brand-new facade in a related renovation, which was completed by the fall of 2013.

In June 2013, Old Navy announced plans to move to Northgate.

In January 2014, JCPenney announced plans to close its Northgate store in June.

On November 8, 2018, it was announced that Sears would close in early 2019, as part of a plan to close 40 stores.

In 2020, Hamilton County Schools proposed turning the old Sears into the new site of Chattanooga School for Liberal Arts, but the board voted against this.

Burlington announced in September 2023 that it would be closing and relocating to the former Bed Bath & Beyond.

In September 2024, plans were announced for the demolition of the former Sears to make way for a brand new 99,000 square foot BJ's Wholesale Club, which will be the first store of its kind in the region. Construction on the new store began in 2025 with the demolition of the former Sears to build a new anchor structure. Construction was eventually completed and BJ’s Wholesale Club opened on January 30, 2026.

In late 2025, plans began to renovate the sewer system to bring it up to date. Renovation work on these sewer systems is slated to begin sometime in 2026.
