= Hamilton Place (shopping mall) =

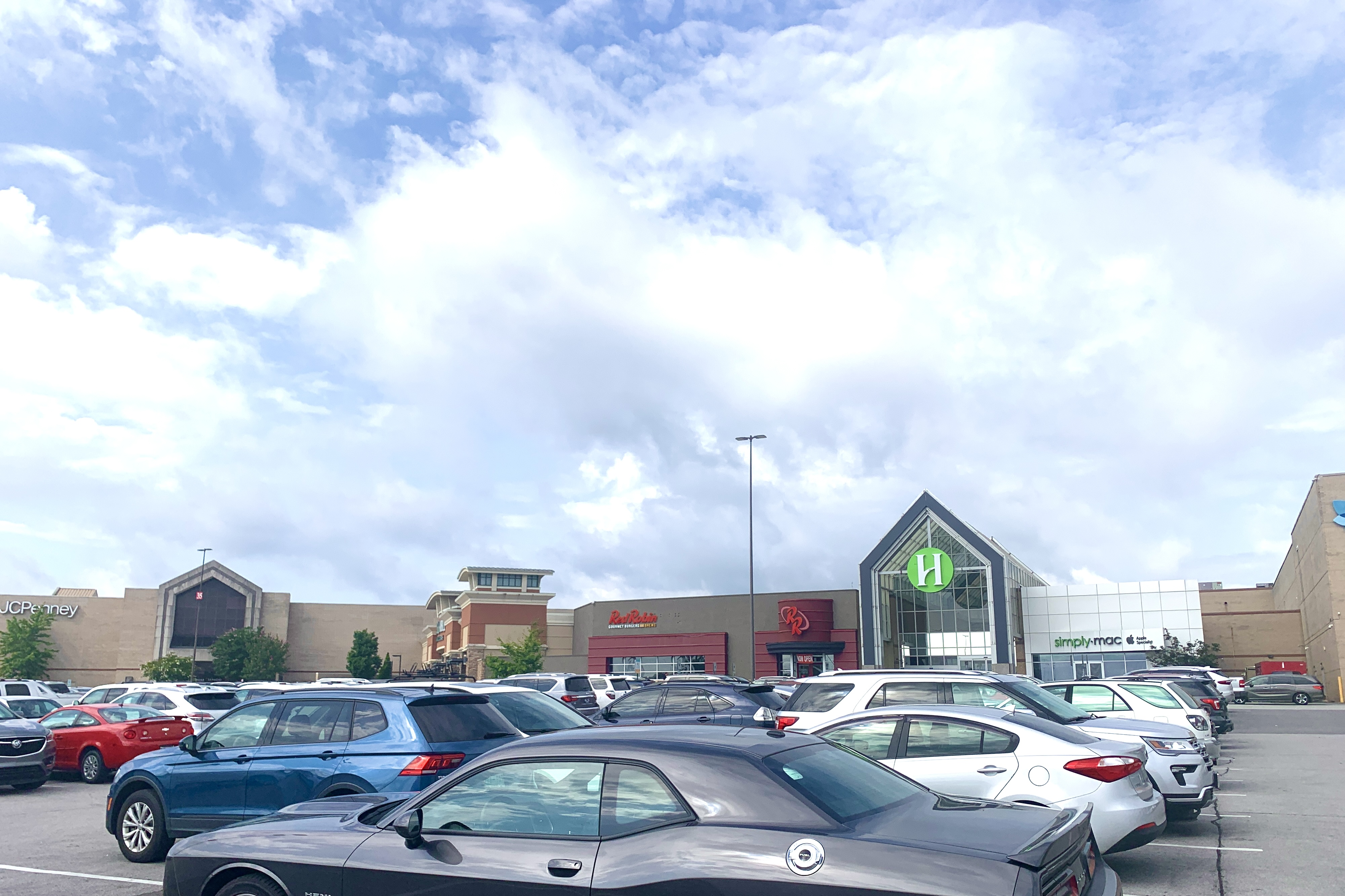
- External view of the mall, July 2022
- Location: Chattanooga, Tennessee, United States
- Coordinates: 35°02.038′N 85°09.763′W
- Address: 2100 Hamilton Place Blvd.
- Opened: August 5, 1987; 39 years ago
- Developer: CBL & Associates Properties, Inc.
- Manager: CBL Properties
- Owner: CBL Properties
- Num. of stores: 200+
- Num. of anchor tenants: 7
- Floor area: 1,170,712 square feet (108,763 m^{2})
- Floors: 2
- Parking: 7,500
- Website: hamiltonplace.com

Hamilton Place is an enclosed, two-story super-regional shopping mall located in Chattanooga, Tennessee, United States, just off I-75. It was the largest shopping mall in the state of Tennessee at its time of opening in 1987 to 1994.

== History ==
The mall opened to the public on August 5, 1987. The original anchors were Belk, Parisian, Loveman's, Regal Cinemas 9, and Sears. JCPenney and Hess's stores were added later, vacating their former locations at Eastgate Mall. Proffitt's acquired Loveman's in 1988. Proffitt's then acquired Hess's in 1992 creating the dual store location. In 1998, Belk "swapped" several mall locations throughout the southeast with Dillard's, thus exiting the Chattanooga market only to return in 2005 after its purchase of Proffitt's from Saks Incorporated. In 2006 Belk purchased Parisian, also from Saks Inc., and closed this location which would later become a Dillard's Men's, Children & Home store.

In 1998, its owner, CBL & Associates Properties, began a major interior renovation of the mall, expanding the food court by 6,000 square feet (557 m^{2}), and making the mall wheelchair accessible. Currently, Hamilton Place comprises more than 150 stores and restaurants. Current anchor stores include JCPenney, as well as two locations each for Belk and Dillard's. Regal Cinemas 9 closed in September 2007 and was replaced with a Barnes & Noble which opened on November 12, 2008, although there is still a Regal Cinemas on an outparcel of the mall.

In May 2008, CBL announced a $100 million expansion which would have included two parking garages, a lifestyle center, and other renovations inside and outside the existing mall. In order to pay for the expansion, CBL proposed an additional half-percent to 1 percent fee added to any purchase made at the mall or at five other CBL centers within a one-mile radius of Hamilton Place. The other locations were Gunbarrel Pointe, Hamilton Corner, Hamilton Crossing, The Shoppes at Hamilton Place, and The Terrace. However, CBL eventually dropped its ambitious plans; in turn, replacing the original plans with a smaller expansion. The Shoppes at Hamilton Place received a 6,000 square feet (560 m^{2}) expansion, adding stores such as a local restaurant chain, Sweet Peppers Deli, and bath products chain Bath Junkie.

A P.F. Chang's restaurant that is located outside Hamilton Place has had a unique theme in the 200+ unit chain since the restaurant opened in November 2006: a water theme, based on the fundamental role the Tennessee River plays in Chattanooga and the fact that the CEO of P.F. Chang's since 2000, Richard Federico, is a 1976 alumnus of the University of Tennessee and has family members in Chattanooga.

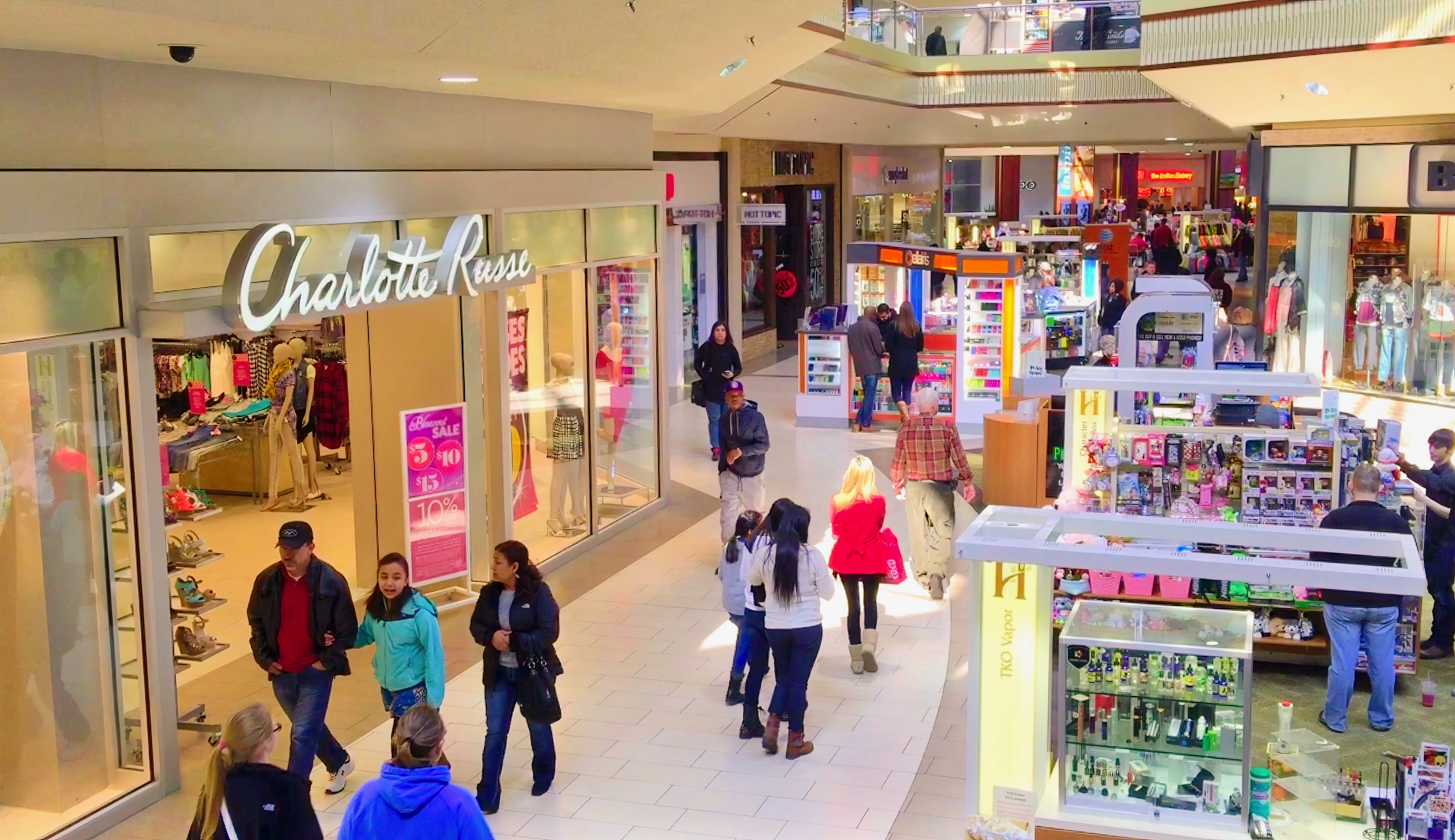
The interior of Hamilton Place Mall

On January 25, 2011, CBL announced a multimillion-dollar renovation to the mall. Construction on the Hamilton Place renovations began in March and lasted 11 months, finishing in November 2011. The construction was done in phases and most of the work occurred during off-hours and at night while the mall was closed. Hamilton Place remained open throughout the duration of the renovations.

On November 5, 2017, H&M opened a store on the upper level of the mall.

On October 15, 2018, Sears announced that it was filing for Chapter 11 bankruptcy protection. As part of that announcement, they announced the closure of 142 stores, including the one at Hamilton Place, with liquidation sales to begin immediately. Its final day of business was January 6, 2019.

It was announced on November 12, 2018 that Dave and Busters would be locating in the old Sears building. In December 2018, Dick's Sporting Goods announced they would move from their current location on Gunbarrel Road, a few hundred yards away from the mall, to inside the mall next to Dave and Busters.

== Current anchor stores ==
- Dillard's (Women) (Originally Belk) 128,897 square feet (11,975 m^{2})
- Dillard's (Men, Home, & Children) (Originally Parisian) 92,520 square feet (8,595 m^{2})
- Belk (Women & Children) (Originally Loveman's, then Proffitt's, and finally Proffitt's for Her) 130,875 square feet (12,159 m^{2})
- Belk (Men & Home) (Originally Hess's and then Proffitt's Men's, Kids & Home) 115,000 square feet (10,684 m^{2})
- JCPenney (Original Anchor) 157,799 square feet (14,660 m^{2})
- Dave & Buster's (upper level) and Dick's Sporting Goods (lower level, both opened in March 2020) (Originally Sears) 151,577 square feet (14,082 m^{2})

Records
| Preceded by Mall of Memphis; Memphis, Tennessee | Largest mall in Tennessee; 1988–1998 | Succeeded by West Town Mall; Knoxville, Tennessee |
