= The Mall at Johnson City =

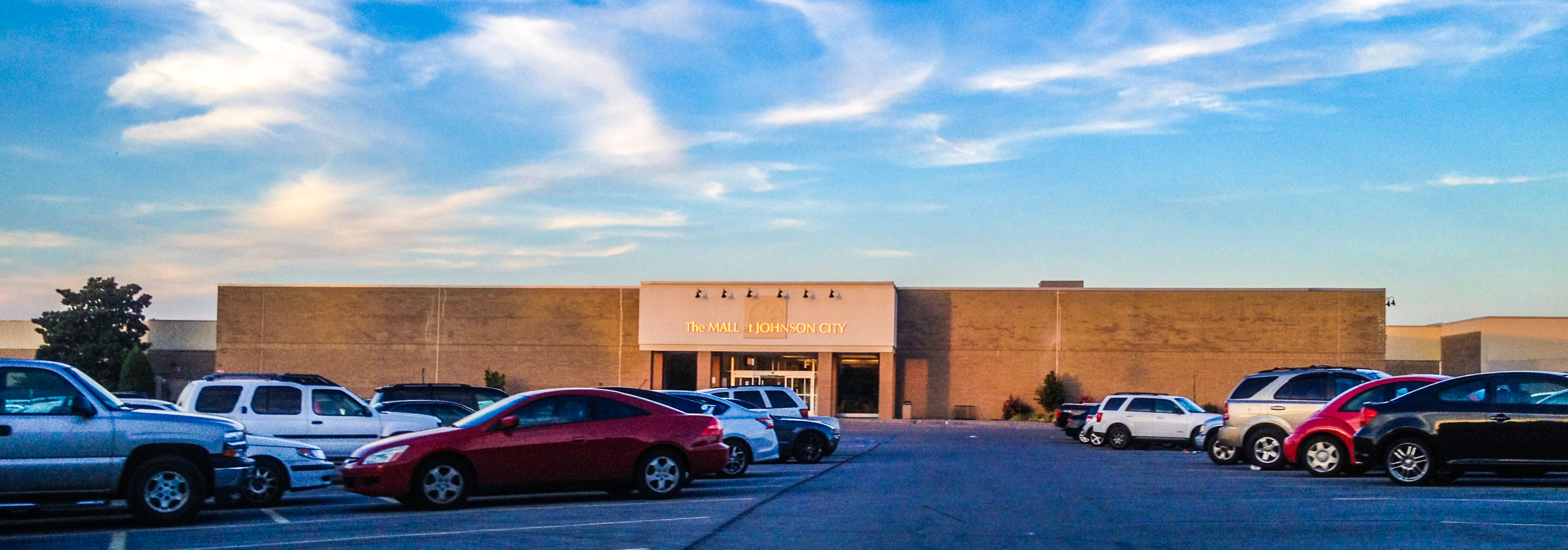
- Entrance to The Mall at Johnson City, September 2013
- Location: Johnson City, Tennessee, United States
- Coordinates: 36.338109°N 82.377597°W
- Opened: March 17, 1971; 55 years ago
- Developer: Arlen Shopping Centers
- Manager: Spinoso Real Estate Group
- Owner: Spinoso Real Estate Group
- Num. of stores: 90+
- Num. of anchor tenants: 5
- Floor area: 534,873
- Floors: 2
- Parking: 2,885
- Website: mallatjohnsoncity.com

The Mall at Johnson City is an enclosed shopping mall in Johnson City, Tennessee, United States. The mall features over 90 stores and a food court. It is managed by Spinoso Real Estate Group. Opened in 1971, the mall features Dick's Sporting Goods, HomeGoods, Belk, and JCPenney as anchor stores, with more than 90 inline tenants.

== History ==
=== Beginnings ===
Construction began on the mall in the very early 1970s and opened on March 17, 1971. When completed this one story mall was the second in the Tri Cities. The mall had two major anchors, a grocery store, drug store, a McCrory five and dime, and a movie theater. Several stores local to the Tri-Cities area were also featured. The mall originally had the name "Miracle Mall Shopping Center".

==== Original 1970s anchors ====
- Sears, Roebuck and Company (original anchor)
- Britt's Department Stores (two-story store)
- Kroger (outside entrance)
- SupeRx Drugs

=== Additions and new anchors ===
During the early part of the 1980s the mall underwent an expansion. There was a new addition built at the Sears end of the mall. This new upper level was almost as big as the original mall. It included a JCPenney that had been located downtown until 1983 and a Miller's Department Store. An addition was made to the lower level giving it access to the new upper level with escalators and an elevator. This was also the time that the mall saw an original anchor Kroger also pulled out and moved into its own store across the street. Piccadilly moved into part of the old Kroger space.

==== 1980s anchors ====
- Sears, Roebuck and Company (original anchor)
- JCPenney
- Miller's Department Store
- SupeRx Drugs

=== 1990s ===
As the region continued to grow, so did the mall. The Miller's Department Store was converted to Hess's before being closed when Hess's went bankrupt. The Mall underwent a major renovation which included the addition of a new food court on the lower level at the transition to the upper level. This renovation included a new anchor store behind the mall in the space of the former theater; the initial tenant was Proffitt's. This store opened in 1992 as the now vacant Hess's store became Proffitt's. Parks-Belk was acquired by Proffitt's in 1994 and became Proffitt's for Her. This resulted in the closure of the Proffitt's home store which was later leased to Goody's Family Clothing, and the former Hess's store being named Proffitt's for Men, Kids, and Home. Glimcher Reality purchased the Mall in 1996 for $44 million.

==== 1990s anchors ====
- Parks-Belk
- Sears
- Goody's Family Clothing
- Proffitt's
- JCPenney

=== 2000s ===
In 2006 Proffitt's was acquired by Belk and resulted in a change in the dual anchors. Belk was once again a dominant retailer in the Tri-Cities following the conversions.

Recently, there have been a series of major additions and expansions being undertaken. Several stores including American Eagle Outfitters and GameStop were relocated from the lower level as the space formerly tenanted by Kroger and Piccadilly Cafeterias was demolished to make way for Dick's Sporting Goods. The interior of the mall underwent a series of makeovers at this time as well. There was an addition to the JCPenney store, doubling its space. After Dick's was finished, Goody's Family Clothing announced in late 2007 that they would not renew their lease, and they closed in January 2008. In February 2008, Bath & Body Works, White Barn Candle Co., Victoria's Secret, and Fanatics 101 moved into other places in the mall to make room for a new Victoria's Secret and Pink (Victoria's Secret) which took over all of the recently moved stores. Kirkland's closed during this time to make room for a Victoria's Secret temporary location. Bath & Body Works took Victoria's Secret's original spot, the White Candle Barn combined with them in the new store.

Nisas Collections opened their store in May 2008. It is located opposite Merle Norman, at the main upper level entrance of the Mall. JCPenney opened their new addition in late June 2008, and the entire store renovation was complete by late fall 2008. The entire Goody's store was then turned into a new corridor that gives access to a new wing. A Forever 21 flagship store opened in the fall of 2009. Ritz Camera closed in early 2009. GNC was moved into a temporary spot until their new permanent store opens. While the interior of the mall was receiving renovations, the roadway entrances also began to be moved and cleaned up to improve traffic flow. The Ruby Tuesday closed on January 13, 2009.

Further expansion plans include space for an additional anchor store outside the former Goody's. However, with the slowing economy it is not expected that a new anchor would be announced for some time. The former Ruby Tuesday location was combined with vacant neighboring space to make room for a new Charming Charlie store that opened early 2011.

==== 2000s anchors ====
- JCPenney (Original upper level anchor)
- Goody's Family Clothing (Former Miller's, Hess's, Proffitt's) Closed January 20, 2008
- Sears (Original Lower Level Anchor)
- Belk for Women (Original Proffitt's location)
- Belk for Men, Kids, & Home (Original Britt's, then Parks-Belk, then Proffitt's Men & Home)
- Dick's Sporting Goods (Original location of Kroger, SupeRx, and Piccadilly) (Current Dick's location)

=== 2010s ===
On September 20, 2019, it was announced that Sears would be closing on January 5, 2020.

==== 2010s anchors ====
- JCPenney
- Sears (Closed January 5, 2020)
- Belk for Women
- Belk for Men and Kids
- Dick's Sporting Goods

=== 2020s ===
On January 29, 2020, it was announced that HomeGoods would be opening in the former Sears space in fall 2021.
