= McWane Science Center =

Science museum and research archive in Birmingham, Alabama, U.S.

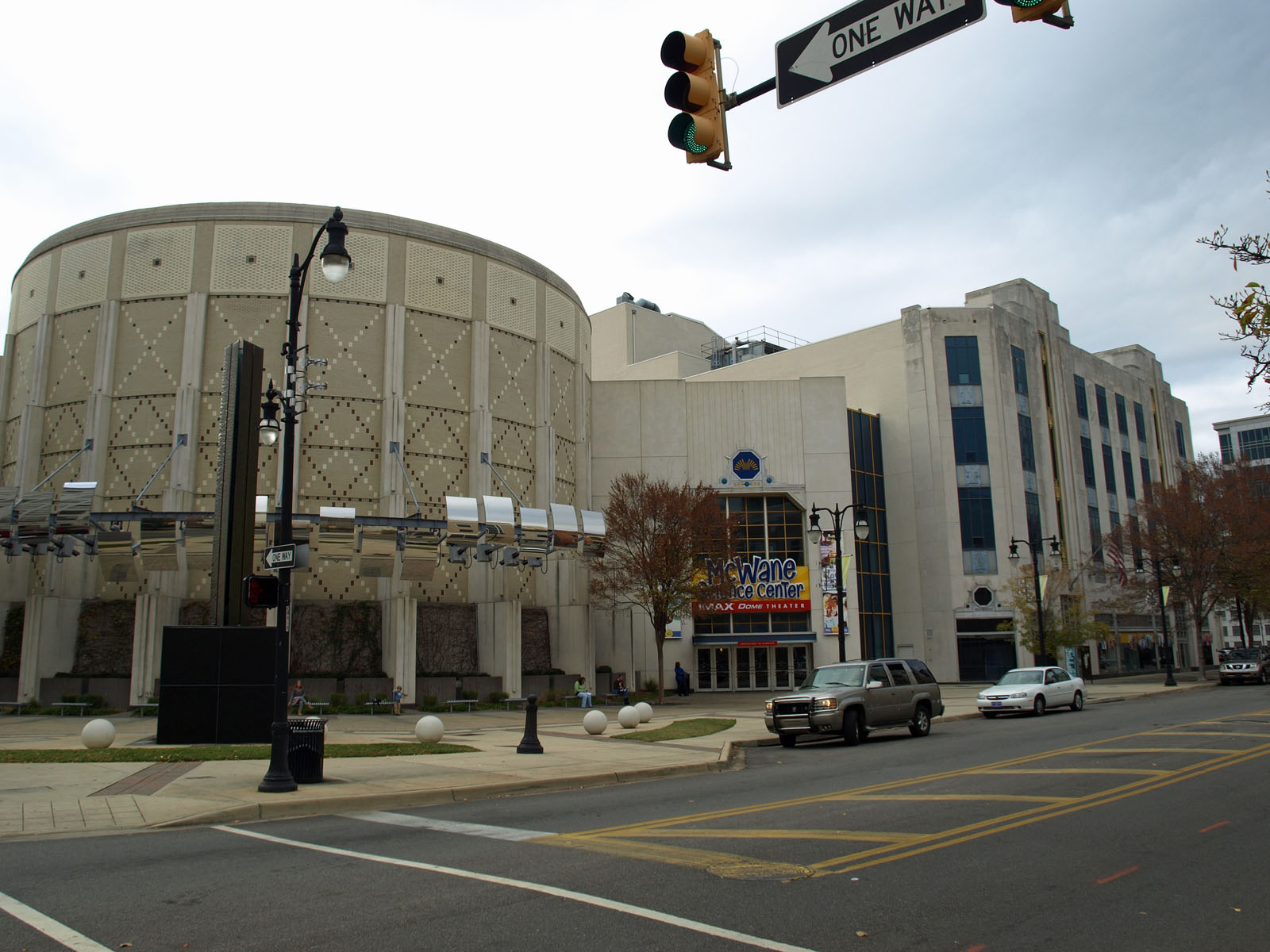
- McWane Science Center in 2011

- Location within Alabama Location within the United States
- Established: 11 July 1998
- Location: 200 19th Street N Birmingham, Alabama, USA
- Coordinates: 33.515079°N 86.808378°W
- Type: Science
- Key holdings: Fossils
- Collection size: 500,000+
- President: Brandan Lanman
- Website: www.mcwane.org

The McWane Science Center (formerly known as the McWane Center) is a science museum and research archive located in downtown Birmingham, Alabama, United States. The state-of-the-art hands-on science center, aquarium, and 250-seat IMAX Dome Theater is housed in the historic and refurbished Loveman's department store building. It opened to the public on July 11, 1998.

On the lower level, the World of Water exhibit showcases more than 50 species of marine and freshwater aquatic life. There is a touch tank with different species of small sharks and rays. There are also shark teeth that can be observed under a microscope and different displays about water pollution.

The Alabama Collections Center (on the second floor) is the home of more than 500,000 items from the former Red Mountain Museum and Discovery Place. The center houses precious minerals, fossils, and Native American artifacts, the most noteworthy including the world's fourth-largest collection of mosasaurs; the Appalachiosaurus (similar to Tyrannosaurus); and the state fossil of Alabama, the Basilosaurus cetoides (an 80-foot or 24-metre fossil whale).

For smaller children there is the Itty Bitty Magic City exhibit (on the second floor), featuring a climbing structure, a water play area, an area specifically for toddlers, and an area with smaller versions of common buildings in a city. The model buildings are all made to help younger children learn skills, or to connect with their parents. One example is a model grocery store where children can learn about the main food groups while "shopping" with their parents. The exhibit opened on May 16, 2015, and was a remodeling of an older early childhood play place with the same name previously located on the third floor.

The McWane Science Center is named after the McWane family and McWane, Inc., both of which helped fund the center. It was built on the site of the former Louis Saks department store.
