= Loveman's (Chattanooga) =

American chain of department stores

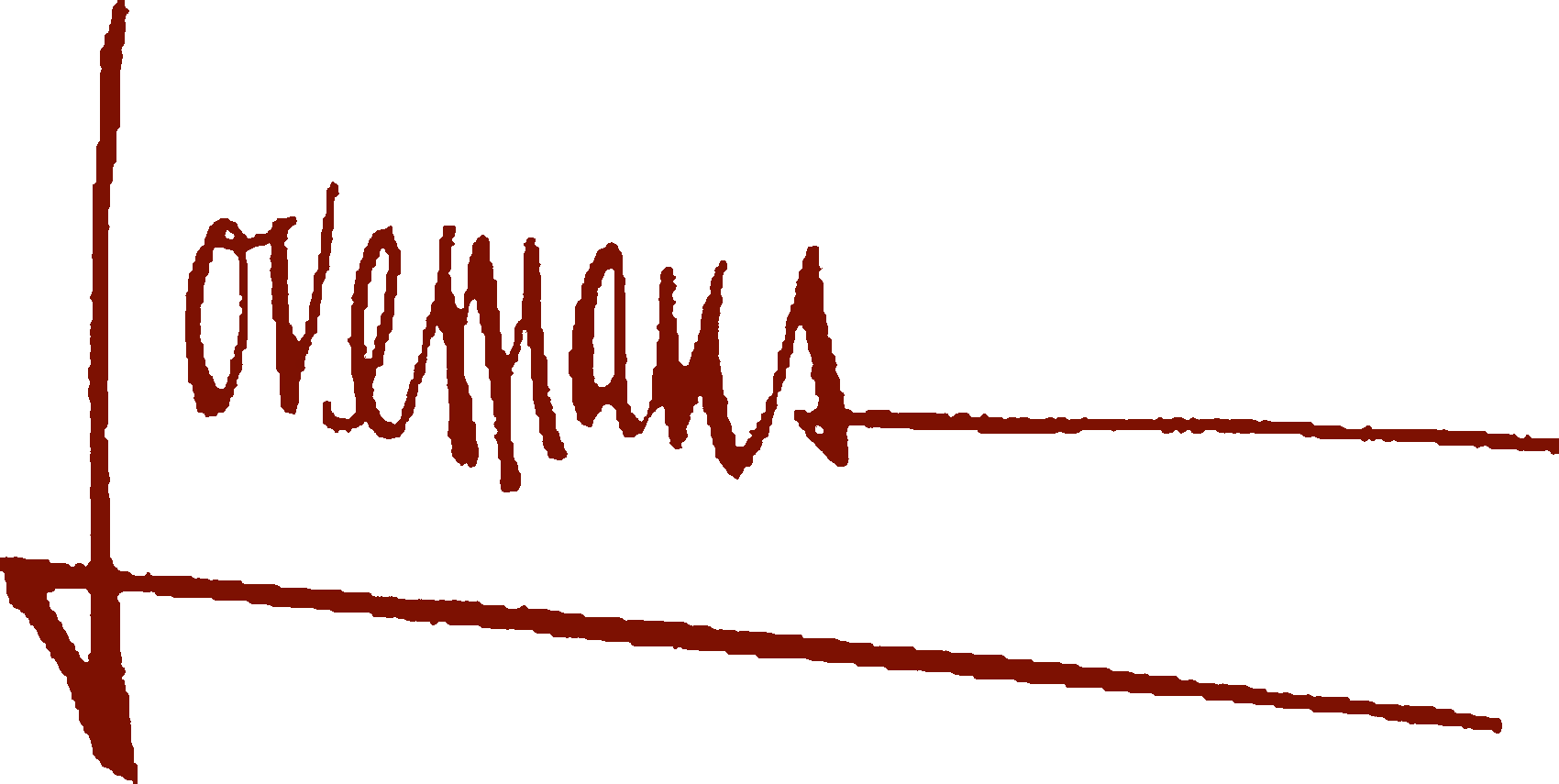
- Industry: Retail
- Founded: 1875
- Defunct: 1988
- Fate: Acquisition by Proffitt's
- Headquarters: Chattanooga, Tennessee
- Key people: David Bernard Loveman, founder
- Products: Clothing, footwear, bedding, furniture, jewelry, beauty products, housewares
- Website: None

Loveman's was a Chattanooga, Tennessee-based chain of department stores with locations throughout East Tennessee and North Georgia. Relatives of the founder of the chain founded Loveman's of Alabama and Loveman's located in Nashville, Tennessee.

== History ==
In 1875, David Bernard Loveman and his brother Herman Herschel Loveman arrived in Chattanooga from Atlanta, Georgia and formed D. B. Loveman and Bro., a dry goods concern. In 1877, Ismar Noa joined the company and it became D. B. Loveman & Company. In 1884 they purchased property at the southeast corner of Eighth and Market Streets, in what was described as "the most important single real estate transaction that had taken place" in Chattanooga up until that time. Building commenced in 1885, and the city's first department store was constructed. It would become Chattanooga's largest department store, and remain so for just over a hundred years.

December 26, 1891, the building was destroyed by fire and the business suffered accordingly. David even declared bankruptcy, but business did not cease. Eventually the company regained its footing and prospered, employing 300 people by 1917. In addition to the downtown Chattanooga flagship store, Loveman's expanded to Oak Ridge, Tennessee, along with several suburban stores in Chattanooga with locations such as East Ridge, Tennessee. Loveman's established a store at Eastgate Mall in 1965. In the early 1970s, Loveman's located in the former JCPenney store in Highland Plaza. (In 1972, JCPenney opened at the then new Northgate Mall in nearby Hixson.) In 1980, Loveman's was an original anchor at Walnut Square Mall in Dalton, Georgia. Loveman's final expansion came as an anchor at Hamilton Place Mall in 1987.

In 1988, however, the chain, which had acquired considerable debt, was bought by Proffitt's, which in turn was acquired in 2005 by Belk. Starting in 2001, the flagship downtown building had been converted to mixed use, with luxury condominiums on the upper floors developed by RiverCity Company. In August 2008, the 31,000-square-foot (2,900 m^{2}) second floor was purchased at auction by the Maclellan Foundation for $1.4 million. Since 2025, the building has maintained its function as a mixed use space, with businesses taking residence on the first and second floors, and condominiums taking the top three levels.
