= Western Hills Mall =

Coordinates: 33.4663°N 86.9129°W

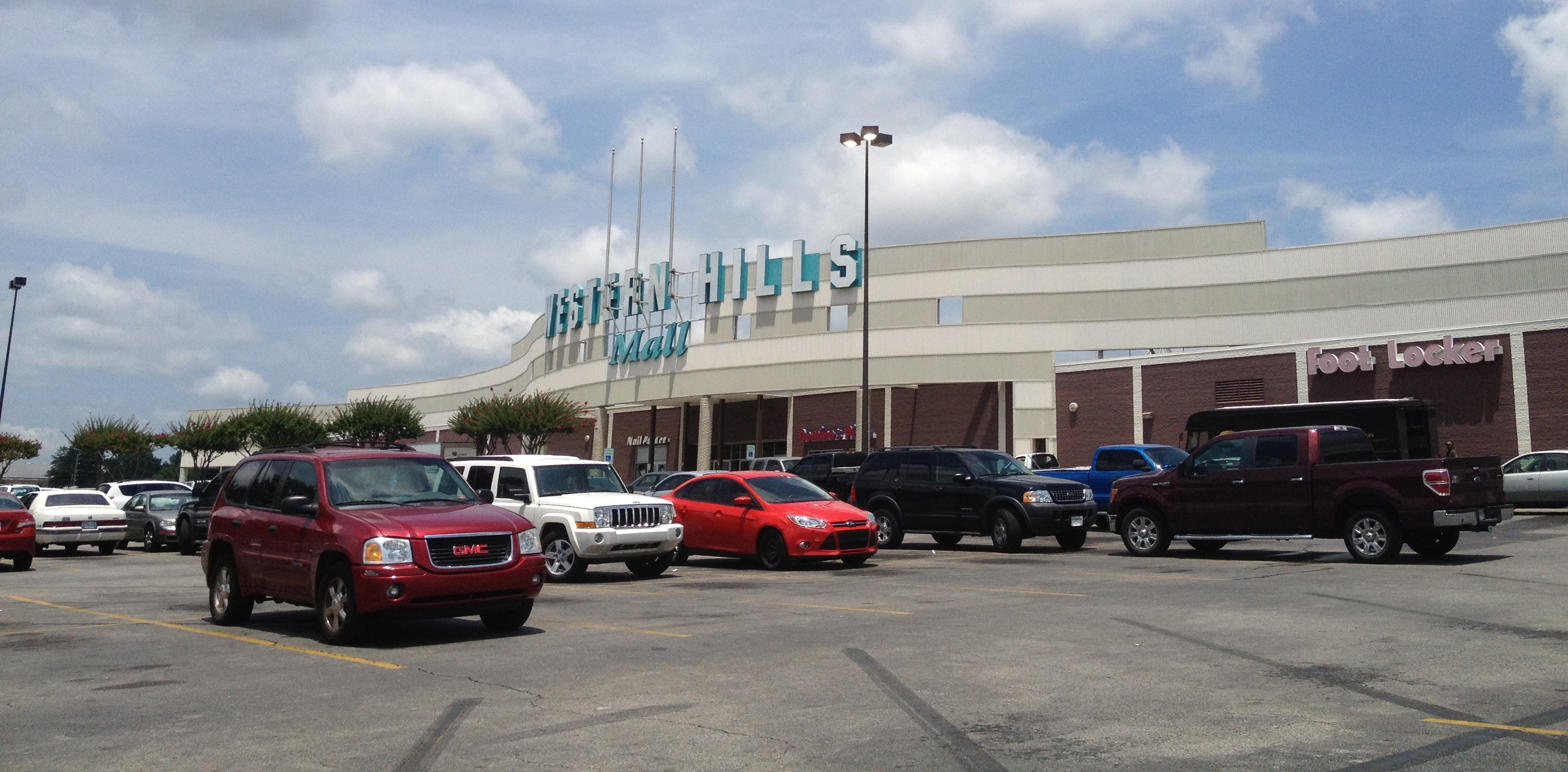
- Exterior view of Western Hills Mall, July 2012
- Location: Fairfield, Alabama
- Opened: 1969
- Developer: Aronov Realty
- Owner: Peleg Group
- Num. of stores: 37
- Num. of anchor tenants: 0 (space for 2)
- Floor area: 547,926 square feet (50,904.0 m^{2})
- Floors: 1
- Website: shopmalls.com

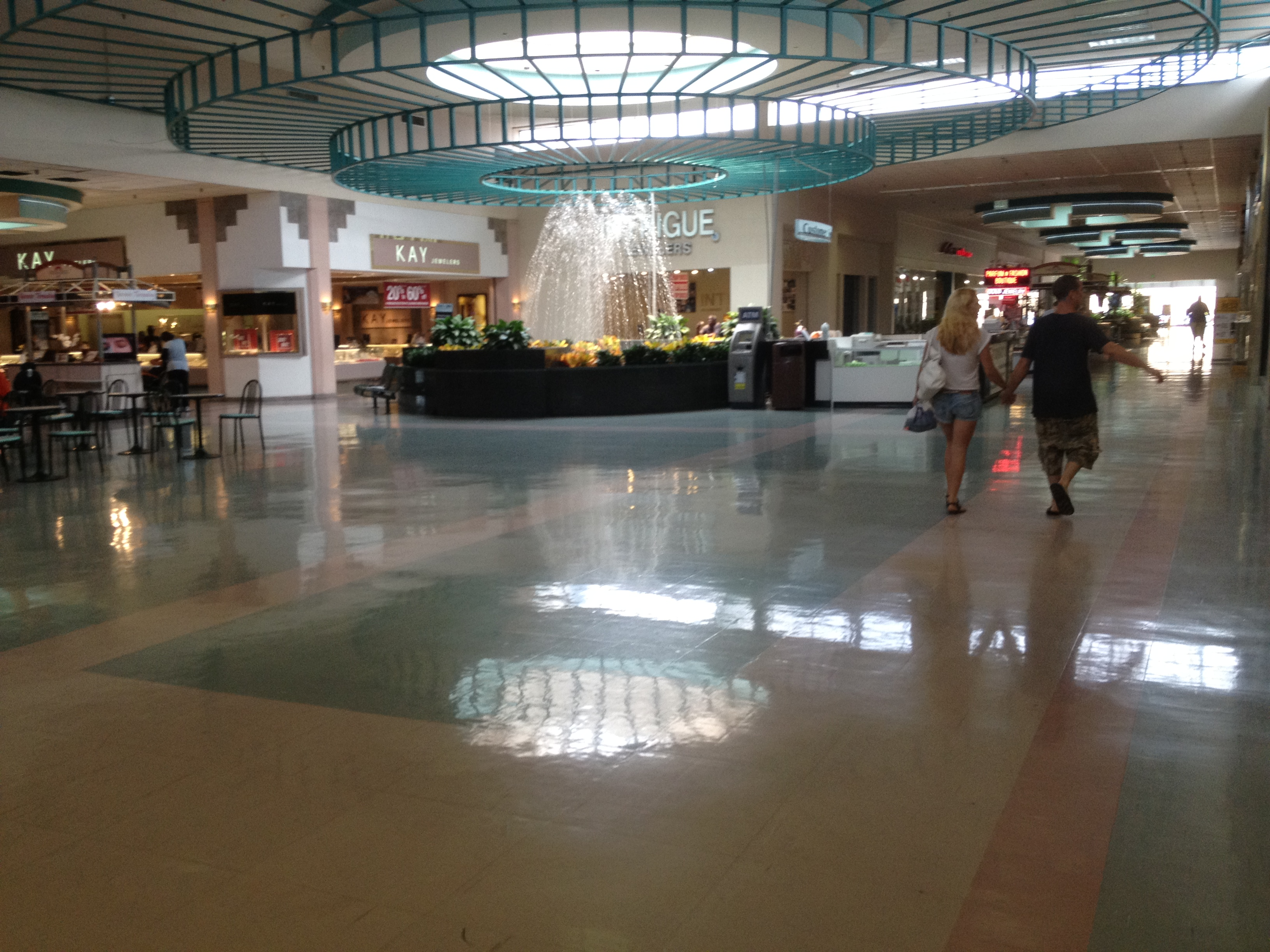
Interior view of Western Hills Mall, July 2012

Western Hills Mall is a shopping mall located in Fairfield, Alabama, United States, a suburb of Birmingham.

The mall opened in 1969 as the second in Birmingham, under the development of Aronov Realty. Loveman's of Alabama, which became Pizitz in 1980, was one of its original anchor stores. Pizitz later became McRae's, then Parisian. JCPenney was the other major store, with Yeilding's and F.W. Woolworth Company as the other major tenants. The Yeilding's space was later occupied by Goody's Family Clothing.

In 2006, Western Hills Mall underwent a major transformation. The JCPenney location was demolished, with the mall building being truncated at the former Penney entrance. A new Walmart Supercenter was built on the site of the former JCPenney. Parisian also closed in the late 2000s and a Burlington Coat Factory took its place.

In January 2016, Walmart Supercenter closed its doors. In February 2017, Burlington Coat Factory also went out of business from the mall, which left the mall with no anchors.

On February 16, 2018, a shootout occurred at the mall. Anthony Alberigi, the manager of the mall, was killed in the gunfire.

In January 2022, the Peleg Group of Miami, Florida, bought the mall from Aronov Realty for $2.94 million. Once taking ownership, they went forward with a $4 million renovation project that included new AC, new paint, a new parking lot and fixing various roof issues.
