= Gardiner Lane, Louisville =

Neighborhood in Louisville, Kentucky

Coordinates: 38°12′53″N 85°40′42″W

Gardiner Lane is a neighborhood in eastern Louisville, Kentucky, United States. Its boundaries are Emerson Avenue to the north, Bardstown Road to the east, I-264 to the south, and Tremont Drive to the west. As with surrounding neighborhoods, it was farmland well into the first half of the 1900s. 16 subdivisions were developed from 1913 to 1950.

The first developed area was on Tremont Drive between Tyler and Dahlia Avenues in 1913. The final subdivision in the neighborhood was Welbrooke Avenue, which was completed in 1950.

Assumption High School, opened in 1954, is located in the neighborhood.
