= Loveman's (Nashville) =

Former department store chain

- Industry: Retail
- Founded: ca. 1895
- Defunct: 1976
- Headquarters: Nashville, Tennessee
- Products: General merchandise

Loveman, Berger & Teitelbaum, more commonly referred to as Loveman's, was a Nashville, Tennessee-based full service department store, originally located at 5th and Union streets in that city. Relatives of the founder of this chain founded Loveman's of Alabama and Loveman's located in Chattanooga, Tennessee.

== History ==
Loveman, Berger & Teitelbaum could trace its roots back to the 1862, when father Morris Loveman and his son David Loveman relocated to Nashville. Morris opened a wholesale dry goods and notions house on Cedar Street, while David set up a corset and hoop skirt manufacturing company at 60 North College Street, just north of the City Square. Both Morris' and David's businesses prospered. David's, which became D. Loveman & Company, expanded beyond hoop skirts, which eventually became unfashionable, into a larger dry goods establishment. With the addition of partners Samuel W. Berger and Henry Teitelbaum in the 1890s, it became a department store and took the name Loveman, Berger & Teitelbaum, and the sobriquet, "The Satisfactory Store."

The company erected their flagship store at Fifth and Union Streets in downtown Nashville around 1900. The building was sold in 1961, and razed in 1966. In 1951, it opened a suburban location at Harding and White Bridge Roads, which became its flagship store. The remaining store closed its doors in 1976.
