= Gustavus Hindman Miller =

Gustavus Hindman Miller.

Gustavus Hindman Miller (1857–1929) was a merchant, manufacturer, financier, capitalist farmer, author and public spirited citizen of Chattanooga, Tennessee.

== Early life ==
Gustavus was born in frontier Texas, September 4, 1857, in a small board house on a ranch, on Raney's Creek, Beat No. 3, near where the present site of Coryell County now stands.

Home of Franklin Lafayette Miller, Coryell County, Texas (1857).

He was the eldest son of Franklin Lafayette Miller (b. 1832, Millersburg, Tennessee; m. 18 Oct. 1862) and Emily (McGee) Miller (b. 11 May 1841, Jackson, GA), early pioneer settlers of that county. Interesting sketches of their experiences and accomplishments are given in Millers of Millersburg (1923) a family record published by Gustavus H. Miller in conjunction with J. Bailey Nicklin, Jr.

He had two brothers, Felix Grundy Miller III (b. 17 Dec 1859; d. 18 Oct 1863) who died age three, and Franklin Lubbock Miller I (b. 21 Jan 1862), who later became one half of the Miller Brothers.

He and his brother Frank were toddlers when their father died in army (CSA) camp in Galveston, Texas, 18 October 1862. Yellow Fever took Franklin Lafayette Miller, he never faced combat.

In his book The Millers of Millersburg he Miller reminisced:

"It is interesting to follow the illusive tracery in memory across that hazy span of life between the ages of four and seven. My father and Grandmother McGee died when I was about four years of age. I only remember to have seen my father going to the barn or attending to the stock—a colt or calf was prominent in my affection at that age. I only remember to have seen my grandmother when cooking. She must have encouraged me, her second grandson, in loving her, by giving me such dainties as she could prepare from meager after-servings. My grandmother's death lost her children a boundless love. My memory of these two ancestors is no doubt due to an inherited love of saddle and bridle, and a more primitive instinct to look for something to eat. I do not remember having seen my father about the house, or any game he may have played with us."

His mother remarried, 20 March 1865, to James Franklin Mayfield (b. 20 Dec. 1846). The orphan brothers were raised in the crowded house of their maternal grandfather (James Lowery McGee b. 29 Dec. 1816, Jackson Co., GA d. 10 Jul. 1895, TX), along with the two groups of children sired by that worthy, and his surviving wife. Between the large number of mouths to feed, and depressed conditions following the Confederate loss of the Civil War, conditions for all the inhabitants of the McGee household were grim.

Miller recalled:

"About two years after grandmother's death, grandfather married a young widow with two children, Mrs. Hannah Miller, daughter of William Miller. Six children were born to this marriage. Owing to the second marriage of my mother, grandfather became the guardian of my brother and myself. We therefore spent much of our time in his home. When the family was rounded out, there were four sets of children; ten by his first wife, six by his second, two stepchildren, and two grandchildren.
My grandfather was a man of sterling character; the trick fellow who would cheat in a trade did not appeal to him. He had contempt for many successful men because he believed them dishonest. He used to trade in a dry goods store where there were two brothers. He said one was honest, but the other was not. Time proved his insight correct."

G. H. Miller obtained his education in the common schools of Coryell county, Texas, 1867–76, at the old board shanty and the old rock house. In 1870, the census lists Gus and his brother Frank, as living with their mother, stepfather, two half-siblings and a lodger, in Bosque County, Texas.

Recollections of their school days by William King Sadler, a close friend of G. H. Miller:

"Gus, I think of you more than ever as I get old. The happiest of my days were when we went to school at the old board shanty and the old rock house. ...those were great days. We never dreamed of violating the law; our minds were in a different channel. We were taught honesty if we were taught anything. We ran our own boat from the beginning, almost."
"I want to impress upon you that this Rainey's Creek country is level prairie, fine black land, owned by Germans. Gus and I can well remember when it was the greatest country, socially, in the world. The boys and girls who were raised there have proved to be the very highest type of manhood and womanhood. No one ever heard of trouble with the old settlers, that is, between themselves. Then we visited and loved each other and lived peaceably with all mankind.
We were what you folks call wild, but we were sons of adventurers who came here, to land untried. We would ride the wildest horses ever known to the world. We didn't do anybody any harm. I have seen this same polished, shrewd Gustavus Miller ride the wildest horses I ever saw. I saw him tie a red handkerchief around his head, make his horse pitch around the arbor where preaching was to be held for the benefit of the crowd. He didn't charge a cent nor do any harm!"

== Professional life ==
As soon as Gus and Frank were of age, they put aside their textbooks and turned their attention to mercantile interests, Gus left Texas age 20, and he and Frank traveled to Tennessee, where their father had been raised, ten miles (16 km) south of Murfreesboro. He first obtained a position as clerk in a country store at Christiana, Tennessee, January 23, 1877, and subsequently was employed at Waco, Texas.

Since age conferred upon him the right of franchise Mr Miller has supported the men and measures of the republican party, while in religious faith he is a Unitarian.

In 1879 he opened a general merchandise store at Burrustown, Tennessee. Then started a business of his own at Bellbuckle, Bedford County, Tennessee, 1880; and was engaged in business there from 1883 until 1889. His brother, Frank Lubbock Miller, married Mattie Johnson of Shreveport, Louisiana, 25 January 1887.

Despite the demands of his business career, he devoted his evenings to writing a number of books, including the following:

- Lucy Dalton, 1883;
- Is Marriage a Failure, 1895;
- What's in a Dream?, 1901;
- Thysparia the Mysterious, 1909;
- Tribute to His Brother, 1921;
- The Jew, 1921;
- and The Millers of Millersburg, in collaboration with John Bailey Nicklin, Jr., 1923.

The year 1889, due to various business ventures, witnessed their removal to Chattanooga, Tennessee, where he settled with his younger brother, F. L. Miller, Sr., and became prominent in the business world.

They opened their first store at 510 Market Street, where they prospered in the retail business, first in distressed merchandise, eventually moving up to a full-featured department store: the Miller Brothers' Company department store, founded 1889, adding a wholesale department in 1895. They conducted business under the name of Miller Brothers Company, jobbers, brokers and mill agents.

Miller Bros. Center: Gustavus Miller, Mayor Watkins, and Franklin Miller.

Miller Bros. Co's. Department Store. "The store that made Chattanooga famous."

After this store burned, the brothers raised the money needed and began planning their new Miller Brothers Department Store in the downtown area of Chattanooga. The architect chosen was Reuben Harrison Hunt. The Miller Brothers Building was constructed in 1898 in a Victorian Romanesque style, initially with 110,000 square feet (10,000 m^{2}) of space. The building was designed with much open floor space to allow for display of merchandise. One of the most distinguishing features of the building was the large skylight on the fourth floor with an open atrium to all four floors allowing a substantial amount of light into the interior of the building.

When the store opened, it was reputed to have “the greatest display of merchandise that has ever been in a Southern store”, business was good, and in fact the store became one of the largest retail stores south of the Ohio River. The Miller Brothers strived to keep up with the changing times and in December 1904, the store was fitted with an elevator service.

The 1900 census lists Gustavus H. Miller as living at 405 Poplar Street, Chattanooga City, with his wife, three children and two lodgers, who were nephews of Tennessee Miller. Three years later, Who's Who in America (1903), lists him as a Democrat, and living at 416 West 5th Street, with his office at the corner of Market and 7th Streets, Chattanooga, Tennessee.

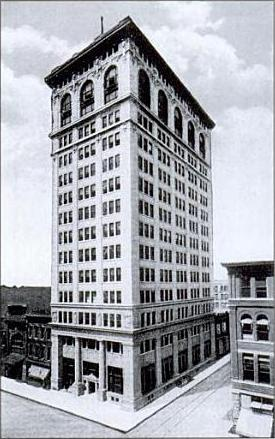
Hamilton National Bank Building. G. H. Miller served as President of this bank.

G. H. Miller was the Founder, served as President, and owned controlling stock in Buster Brown's Hosiery Mills and the United (or Miller-Smith) Hosiery Mills Corporation from 1907 until his retirement in 1923. He was also the President, Director, and senior partner/member of the firm Miller Bros. Co. department store; Vice-President and Director of the Hamilton National Bank of Chattanooga and Standard Coosa-Thatcher Company;and owned controlling stock in the Ross-Hindman and Miller investment companies, the latter firm, of which he was also the Director, established to handle his large realty holdings.

His name is on the membership rolls of the Mountain City Club and the Golf and Country Club.

The 1910 census lists him as living at 509 Walnut Street, Chattanooga City, with his wife, two youngest children and sister-in-law. The 1920 census lists just him, his wife and youngest daughter at the same residence.

His brother Frank died first, on the 28 January 1921, age 60, and the businesses were divided. Gus continued with the retail business, and his son Felix eventually took over for him.

In 1922, the Millers of Tennessee mainly under the leadership of Mr. and Mrs. Gustavus Hindman Miller published a book at a great cost of $38,000. The book was titled, The Millers of Millersburg. Millersburg refers to Millersburg, Tennessee.

"Some of the boys raised on old Rainey's Creek have gone out into the world and have stood the test that makes them the best there is in manhood. More could be said of the girls. / Take Gus and Frank Miller. They went into the business world, met the greatest business talent, traded with them, and made fortunes...."

"Tireless energy, keen perception, honesty of purpose, a genius for devising the right thing at the right time, joined to everyday common sense, guided by resistless will power, are the chief characteristics of the man. He has been watchful of all the details of his business and of all indications pointing toward prosperity and from the beginning had an abiding faith in the ultimate success of his enterprise. He has gained wealth, yet it was not alone the goal for which he was striving, and he belongs to that class of representative American citizens who promote the general prosperity while advancing individual interests."

His mother died at Walnut Springs, Texas, on the 13th of August, 1923, age 82, just a few months after his stepfather, who died on the 15th June 1923, Bosque Co., TX, age 76, and was buried June 17, 1923, at Walnut Springs, TX.

== Personal life ==
On January 23, 1879, Gustavus Hindman Miller married Miss Nancy Tennessee Jameson (b. Jan 30 1858, Rutherford co, TN), usually known as Tennessee or Tennie, of Millersburg, daughter of Thomas Hamilton and Catherine (Donnelly) Jameson. Her ancestors have been prominent in the history of both England and America. They were married at the home of her mother, Mrs. Catherine Jameson, near Christiana, Rutherford County, Tennessee. They had eight children, three of whom lived into adulthood.

1. Claudia Miller. b. 6 May 1880; d. 25 May 1883.
2. Catherine Miller. b. 30 Mar 1882; d. 05 Apr 1885.
3. Corrine Miller. b. 10 Dec 1884; d. 17 Apr 1886.
4. Gloria Miller. “b.” 6 May 1880; “d.” 25 May 1889
5. Franklin Lubbock Miller. b. 07 Jul 1886; m. 25 Nov 1908, in Hamilton Co., TN, Oscar Handly of Knoxville, TN.
6. Gustavus Howells Miller. b. 26 Jun 1889; d. 21 Jul 1893.
7. Emily Jameson Miller. b. 11 Mar 1896; m. 05 Oct 1920, George Blackwell Smith Jr., of Chattanooga, TN; d. 17 Jan 1978, age 81.
8. Felix Grundy Miller IV. b. 01 Jul 1898; m. 19 Jun 1919, Phyllis Lancaster of Chattanooga, TN; d. Jun 1960, age 62.

== Later years ==
In the waning years of his life, Gus still found the energy to travel, to Florida and beyond. Tennie disliked travel and disapproved of drinking and gambling. Gus loved traveling, and drank and gambled when not around Tennie. Phyllis (Lancaster) Miller, like her father-in-law, enjoyed everything. Since her husband was occupied with the business, and Gus was somewhat frail, Phyllis accompanied him on many trips. Gus enjoyed drinks and entertainment, especially gambling in the casinos, as did Phyllis, so they had a good time.

In addition to in the mercantile and manufacturing business, Mr Miller was a farmer and cattle raiser. At various times he held timber interests. At the time of his death he owned a 2,000-acre (8.1 km^{2}) farm and country home at Kensington, Ga, and a 6,000-acre (24 km^{2}) plantation, St. Albans, near Vicksburg, Miss.

G. H. Miller Farm at Kensington, Ga. (Lookout Mountain in background.)

Country Home of G. H. Miller, Kensington, Ga.

== Death ==
Gustavus Hindman Miller died on December 12, 1929, age 72 years old, at the home of his daughter, Mrs. George Blackwell Smith, on Lookout Mountain, Tennessee. The cause of death was an anginal attack. Survivors were the widow, Miss Nancy Tennessee Jameson, two daughters, Mrs. George Blackwell Smith of Chattanooga City, Miss Oscar Handly of Knoxville, a son, Felix G. Miller and three sisters. He was buried at Forest Hills Cemetery on the 13th December, 1929. Funeral services were held from the home.

His surviving wife, Tennessee, and daughter, Emily Jameson, flourished, 1930, at Lookout Mountain, TN. While his other daughter, Franklin Lubbock Miller, flourished at Knoxville, Tennessee, 1930. Nancy Tennessee Jameson Miller died, 15 July 1944, age 86, at Chattanooga, Tennessee, and was buried at Forest Hills Cemetery, in the same lot as her husband, July 17, 1944.
