= CBL Properties =

US real estate investment trust

CBL & Associates Properties, Inc.
- Company type: Public
- Traded as: NYSE: CBL; Russell 2000 component
- Industry: Real estate investment trust
- Founded: 1978; 48 years ago
- Founder: Charles B. Lebovitz
- Headquarters: Chattanooga, Tennessee, U.S.
- Key people: Charles B. Lebovitz (chairman); Stephen D. Lebovitz (CEO); Michael Lebovitz (president); Farzana Khaleel (CFO)
- Products: Shopping centers
- Revenue: ▼US$515 million (2024)
- Net income: ▲US$57 million (2024)
- Total assets: ▲US$2.747 billion (2024)
- Total equity: ▼US$323 million (2024)
- Number of employees: 477 (2024)
- Website: www.cblproperties.com

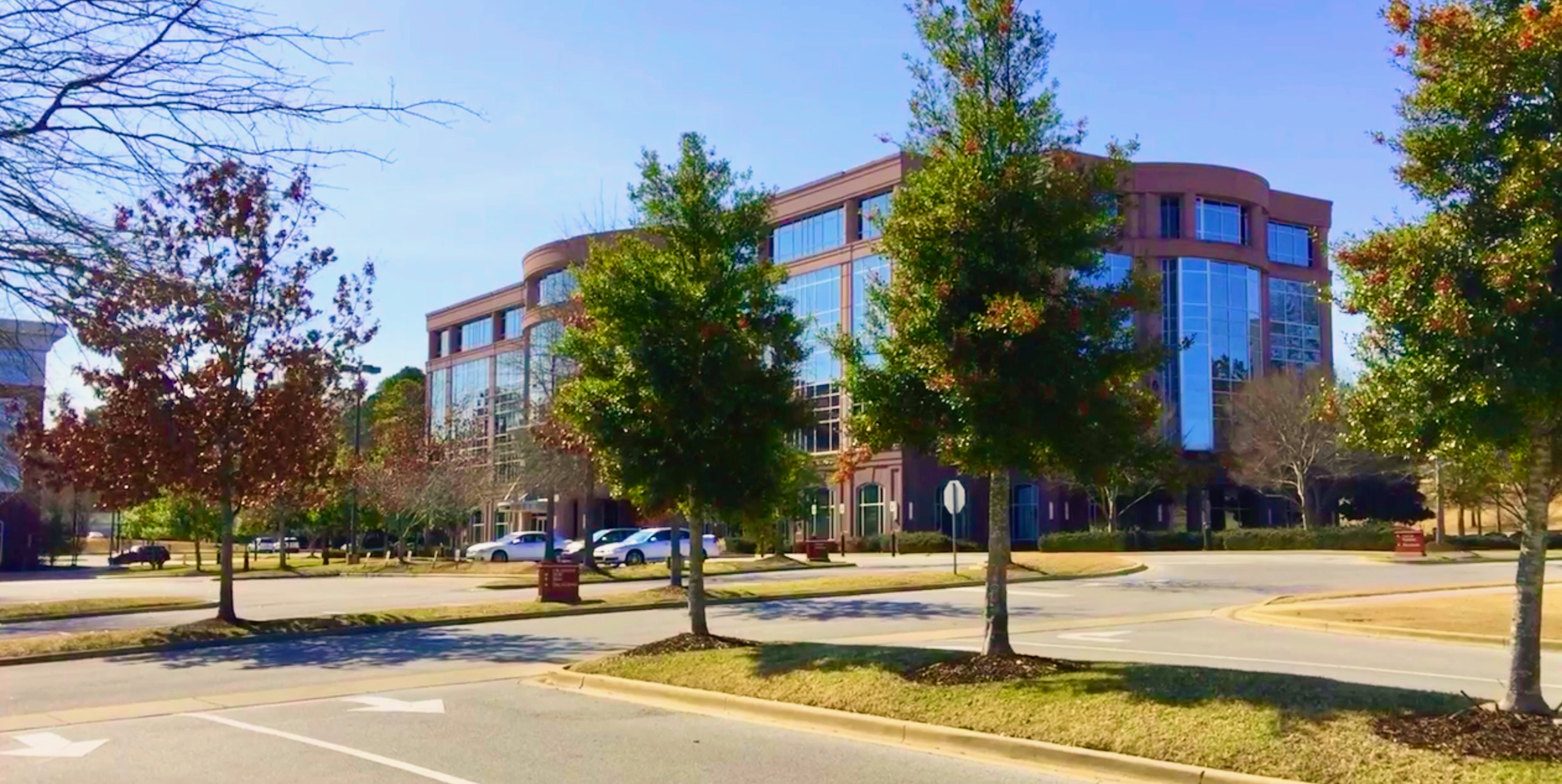
CBL Properties headquarters in Chattanooga, Tennessee

CBL & Associates Properties, Inc. (previously CBL & Associates, Inc.) is an American real estate investment trust that invests in shopping centers and shopping malls, primarily in the Southeastern and Midwestern United States. The company is organized in Delaware with its headquarters in Chattanooga, Tennessee. Its largest market is Chattanooga, Tennessee (6.8% of 2024 revenues). The company's name is based on the initials of its founder, Charles B. Lebovitz.

== History ==
In 1961, Moses Lebovitz, his son, Charles B. Lebovitz, and Jay Solomon founded Independent Enterprises. In 1970, the company merged with Arlen Realty & Development Corporation, which owned shopping centers on the East Coast of the United States. In 1978, Charles B. Lebovitz and five associates formed CBL & Associates, Inc.

In March 1979, the company built its first mall, the Plaza del Sol Mall in Del Rio, Texas. In 1987, the company built Hamilton Place in Chattanooga, its flagship mall. In 1993, CBL & Associates Properties, Inc. was formed as a REIT and acquired all of the assets of CBL & Associates, Inc. The company became a public company via an initial public offering.

In 1998, the company acquired five properties near Nashville, Tennessee for $247.4 million in cash and securities. In 2001, the company acquired a 23-property portfolio from Richard E. Jacobs for $1.3 billion. In March 2005, the company opened Imperial Valley Mall in El Centro, California, its first mall on the West Coast of the United States. In October 2005, the company acquired Oak Park Mall, Hickory Point Mall, and Eastland Mall for $516.9 million.

In 2007, the company acquired four malls in the St. Louis area from Westfield Group, for $1.03 billion. In January 2017, the company acquired five properties from Sears for $72.5 million in a leaseback transaction. In October 2017, the company rebranded itself as CBL Properties from "CBL & Associates Properties". In March 2019, the company settled a lawsuit that it overcharged tenants for electricity by setting aside a $90 million fund to be distributed to the plaintiffs. On November 1, 2020, CBL filed for Chapter 11 bankruptcy. It emerged from bankruptcy protection in November 2021.
