= Loveman's of Alabama =

Defunct Department Store Chain in Alabama, US

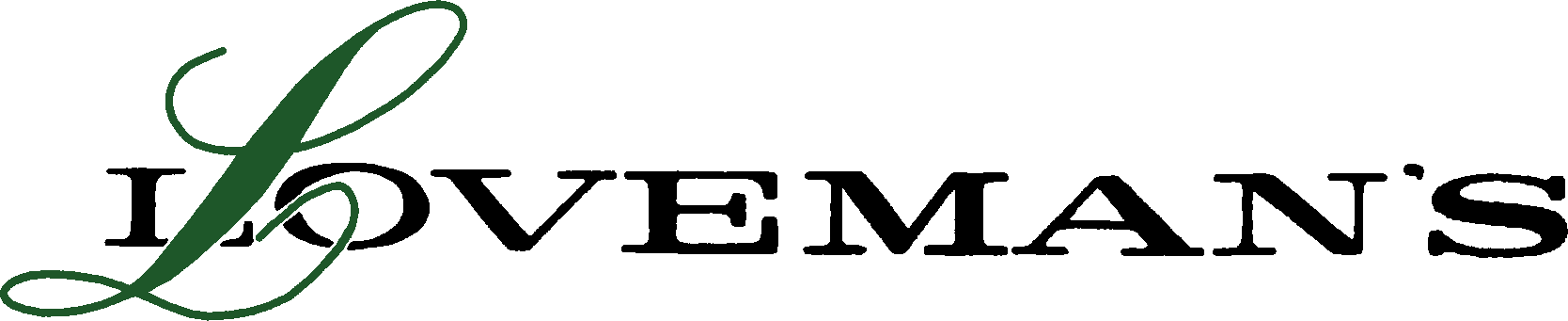
- Industry: Retail
- Founded: 1887; 139 years ago
- Founder: Adolph Bernard Loveman
- Defunct: 1980; 46 years ago
- Fate: Liquidation
- Headquarters: Birmingham, Alabama
- Products: Clothing, footwear, bedding, furniture, jewelry, beauty products, housewares
- Parent: City Stores Company

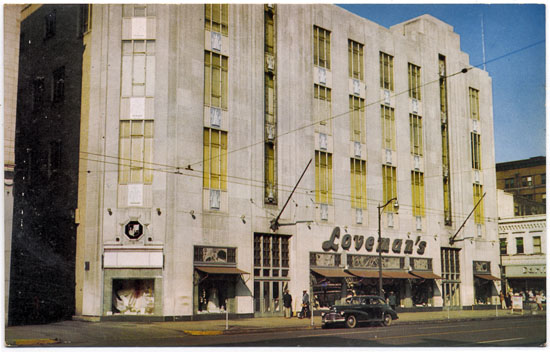
The Loveman's of Alabama, Birmingham store, 1950

Loveman's of Alabama was a Birmingham, Alabama-based chain of department stores with locations across Alabama. It adopted this name to distinguish it from Loveman's department stores operating in Chattanooga, Tennessee, and in Nashville, Tennessee.

== History ==
The store was founded in 1887, as A.B. Loveman's Dry Goods Emporium at 1915 Second Avenue by Adolph Bernard Loveman. Moses V. Joseph of Selma, Alabama, soon joined the company and it was renamed Loveman & Joseph. In 1889, the company became Loveman, Joseph & Loeb with the addition of Emil Loeb.

Loveman's primary location was built in 1890, at 200 19th Street on the corner of 3rd Avenue North. The store was expanded in 1899. By 1911, Loveman's was known as the largest, most magnificent department store south of the Ohio River. In 1917, an add-on known as the Loveman's annex was built between the main building and the Alabama Theatre.

In 1923, Loveman, Joseph & Loeb, along with B. Lowenstein, Inc., of Memphis, Tennessee, and Maison Blanche Co., of New Orleans, Louisiana, were the first three department stores of the Philadelphia, Pennsylvania-based City Stores Company syndicate.

The department store was destroyed in a massive fire on March 10, 1934, although the exterior of the annex survived. The store reopened within a few weeks at a temporary location while a new Loveman's building was built on the site of the fire. The new Loveman's building was completed in 1935. There was a clock on corner of the new building, facing the 19th Street/3rd Avenue intersection, which was a popular local landmark. The new department store was one of the first in the nation to be air conditioned, and the first in Alabama to feature an escalator.

Loveman's opened its first suburban branch store in Montgomery's Normandale Shopping Center in 1954. In 1966, a store came inline in Huntsville's The Mall. The first Metro Birmingham branch was dedicated, in 1969, at Bessemer's West Lake Mall. Branch stores followed at Fairfield's Western Hills Mall (1970) and Birmingham's Century Plaza (1976).

City Stores filed for Chapter 11 bankruptcy in July 1979, forcing liquidation of the chain and closing of the flagship downtown store in April 1980. The downtown Loveman's building was added to the National Register of Historic Places on April 14, 1983. It now houses the McWane Science Center.
