= List of cafeterias =

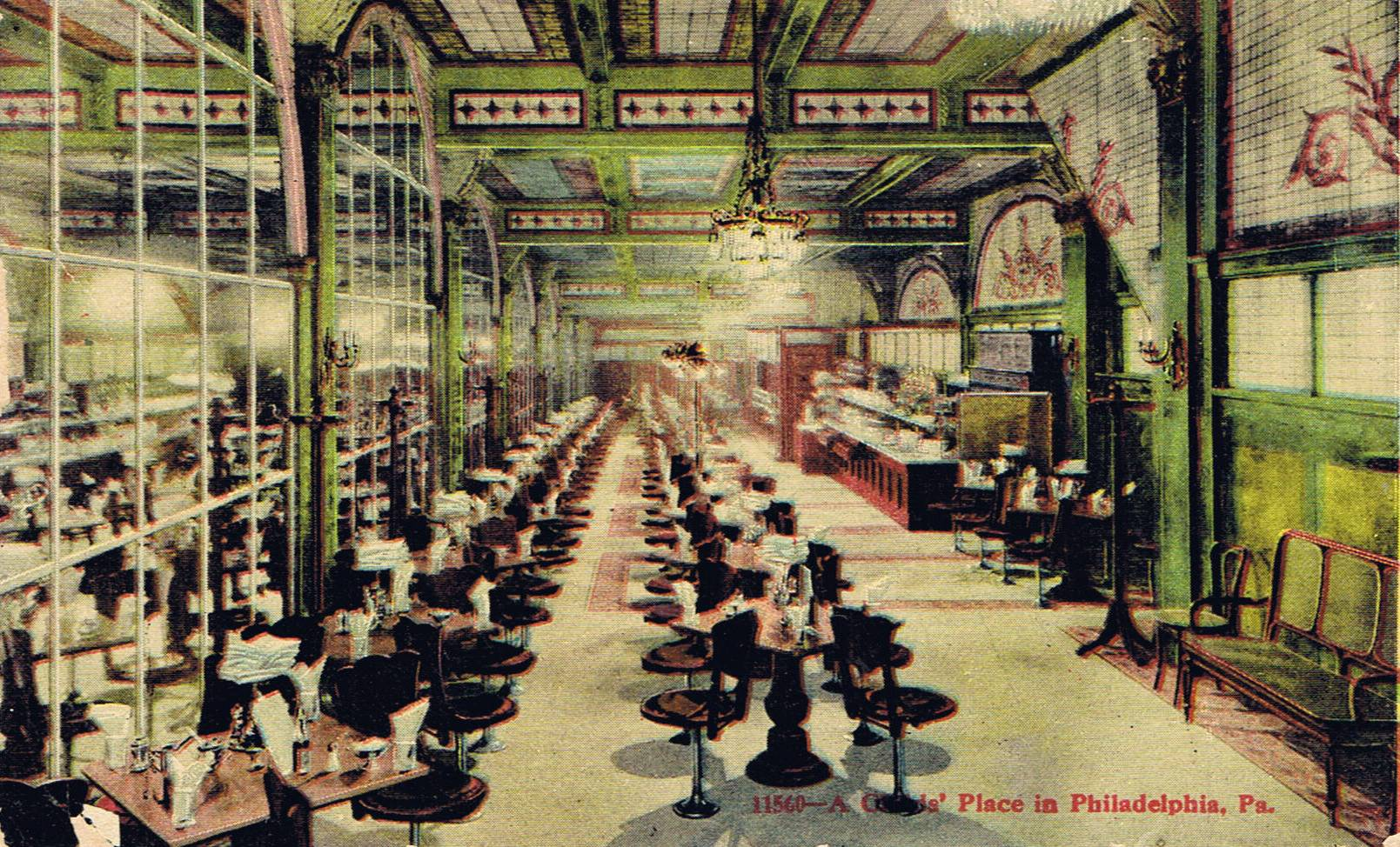
Childs Restaurant, Philadelphia, Pennsylvania, c. 1908

This is a list of cafeterias. A cafeteria is a type of food service location in which there is little or no waiting staff table service, whether a restaurant or within an institution such as a large office building or school; a school dining location is also referred to as a dining hall or canteen (in the UK, Ireland and some Commonwealth countries). Cafeterias are different from coffeehouses, although that is the Spanish meaning of the English word.

== Cafeterias ==
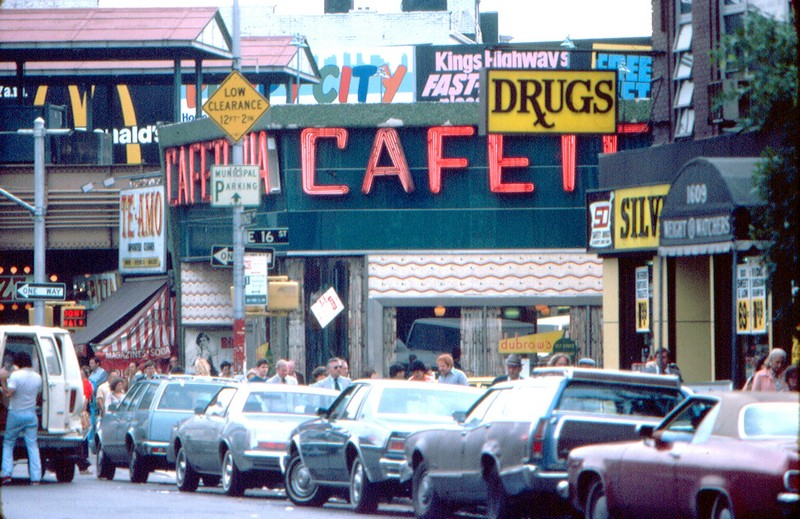
A Dubrow's Cafeteria, c. 1977

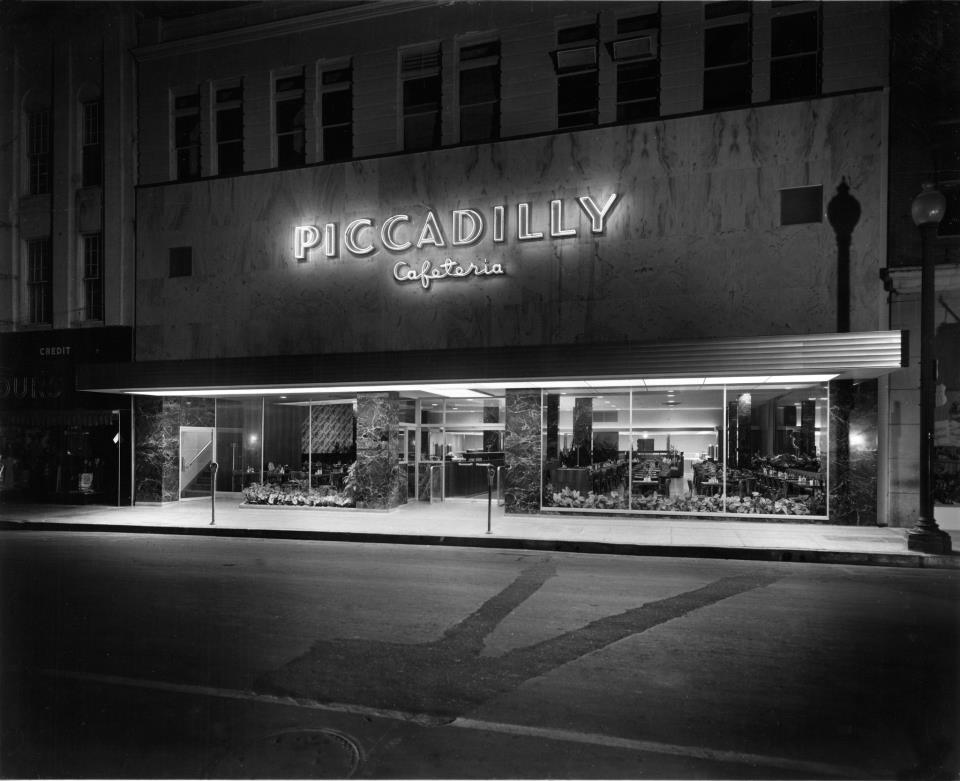
Piccadilly first opened its doors in Baton Rouge, Louisiana, in 1944.

- Bar mleczny
- Bickford's (restaurant)
- Luby's
- MCL Cafeterias
- Piccadilly Restaurants

=== Defunct ===
- Britling Cafeterias
- Childs Restaurants
- Clifton's Cafeteria, Los Angeles
- Dubrow's Cafeteria
- Forum Cafeterias
- Furr's Cafeteria
- K&W Cafeterias
- Laughner's Cafeteria
- Manning's Cafeterias
- Morrison's Cafeteria
- Mr. Fables
- Schaber's Cafeteria, Los Angeles
- Sholl's Colonial Cafeteria

== See also ==
- Automat
- Food court
- Hawker centre
- List of buffet restaurants
- Lists of restaurants
- Types of restaurant
