= Schaber's Cafeteria Building =

Building in Los Angeles, California

- Schaber's Cafeteria
- U.S. Historic district – Contributing property
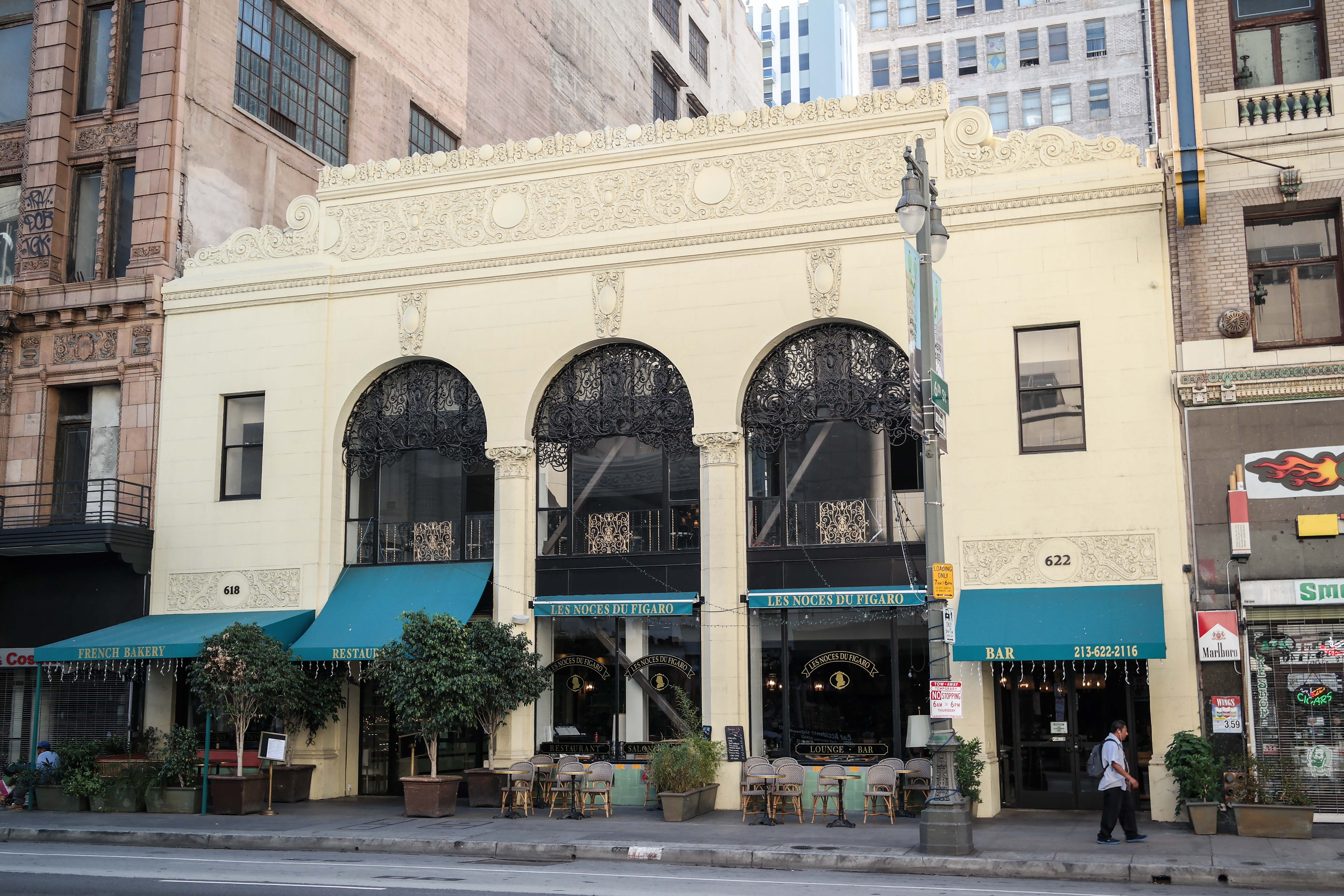
- The building in 2014

- Location within the Los Angeles metropolitan area
- Location: 618 S. Broadway, Los Angeles, California
- Coordinates: 34°02′46″N 118°15′07″W
- Built: 1928
- Architect: Charles F. Plummer
- Architectural style: Spanish Colonial
- Part of: Broadway Theater and Commercial District (ID79000484)
- Designated CP: May 9, 1979

Schaber's Cafeteria, also known as Broadway Cafeteria, is a historic two-story building located at 618 S. Broadway in the Broadway Theater District in the historic core of downtown Los Angeles.

== History ==
Schaber's Cafeteria Building was built in 1928 to house the first Schaber's Cafeteria, a small southern California chain owned by Alfred Gottlieb Schaber. Schaber spent $400,000 ($7.5 million in 2025) to construct and open this location, which was designed by Charles F. Plummer and built by the Scofield Engineering Construction Company. The location, said to be capable of serving 10,000 customers per day, was owned by Schaber's until the mid-1940s, when he sold it to Forum Cafeterias of America for $517,000 ($8.54 million in 2025). The location was then renamed Forum Cafeteria.

Forum Cafeteria was purchased by Consolidated Services, Incorporated in 1973 and this location continued to operate as a cafeteria until 1985, when it became a Carl's Jr. In 1979, when the Broadway Theater and Commercial District was added to the National Register of Historic Places, this building was listed as a contributing property in the district.

The building was heavily damaged during the 1992 Los Angeles Riots and in 2012, it was converted to a bistro that has since closed. The building now houses retail.

== Architecture and design ==
Schaber's Cafeteria was designed in the Spanish Colonial style, built with concrete, and features a terra cotta and wrought iron facade. The facade features five bays, the center three featuring arched openings on the second-floor, the tops of the arches containing fine wrought-iron filigree patterns. The facade also features piers topped with florid Corinthian-like capitals. A marquee was added in 1956.

Schaber's Cafeteria's interior features Spanish tile and a mural by Einar Petersen.

== See also ==
- List of contributing properties in the Broadway Theater and Commercial District
