= Schaber's Cafeteria =

Defunct cafeteria in Los Angeles

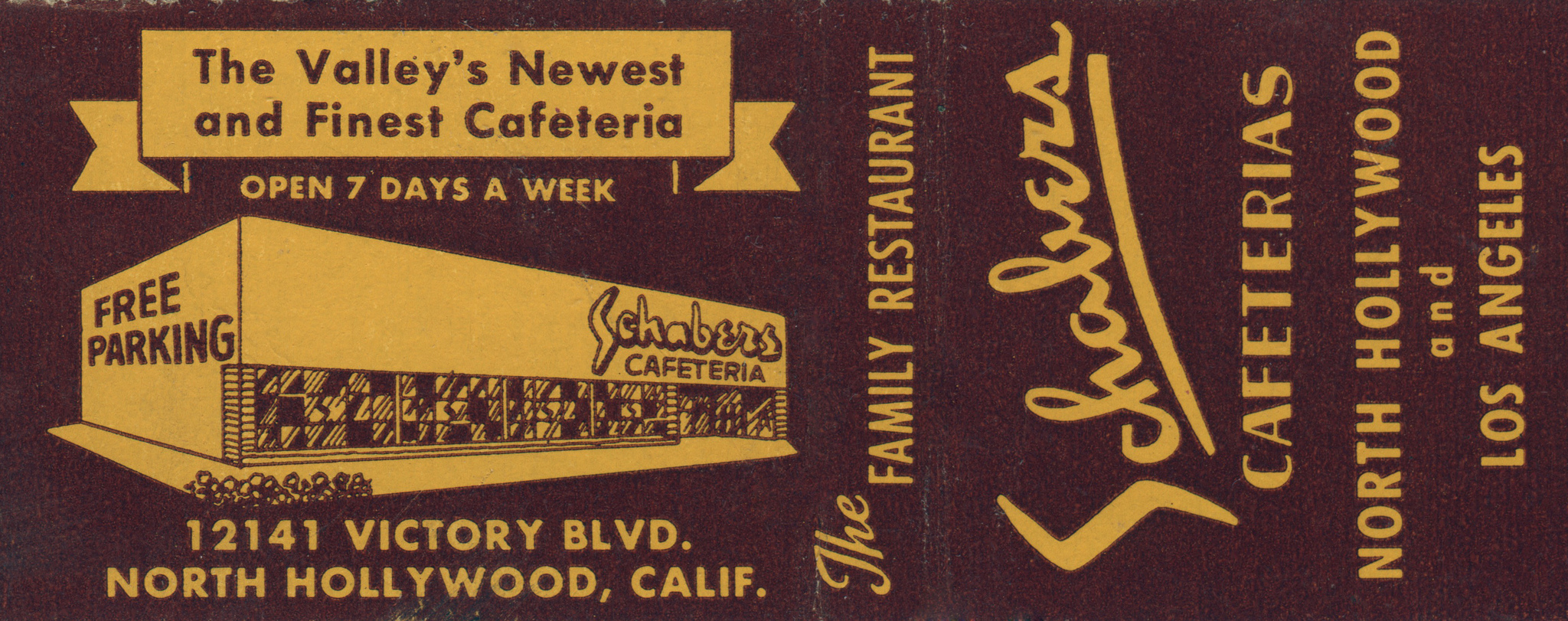
Matchbook from the North Hollywood location

Schaber's Cafeteria was a cafeteria originally located at 620 South Broadway in the Historic Core of Downtown Los Angeles.

== History ==
Alfred T. Schaber, a German immigrant, began his career as a busboy for his cousins the Boos brothers. Schaber launched his cafeteria in 1928, on Broadway in a building designed by Charles F. Plummer, that same architect who designed the Boos family residence and several other retail and hospitality buildings. The Schaber's Cafeteria Building replaced the Platt Music Company Building at a cost of approx. $400,000 ($7.5 million in 2025).

Schaber's Cafeteria was capable of serving up to 10,000 patrons daily. It featured Spanish-style decor and a mural by Einar Peterson, along with an air purification system known as the Sturtevant Air Washer. The cafeteria was popular even during the Great Depression; it was advertised as having a welcoming atmosphere free from the struggles of the era.

Schaber's expanded its business through the 1950s and 1960s. However, in 1947, they sold their Broadway location to Forum Cafeterias, who renamed it Forum Cafeteria, for $517,000 ($7.45 million in 2025). The location was renamed again in 1973, this time to Broadway Cafeteria, and it operated into the 1980s.

In 1955, Schaber's Cafeteria opened its first branch in Valley Plaza in North Hollywood, at a cost of $500,000 ($6.01 million in 2025). This location remained open until 1998, when it closed due to dwindling patronage. Other Schaber's locations continued operating until the business was sold in 1976.
