= Hotel Casa del Mar =

Historic hotel in Santa Monica, California, US

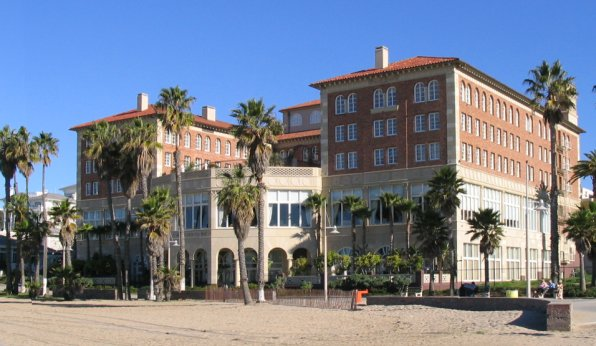

- Location within the Los Angeles metropolitan area Location within California Location within the United States

General information
- Location: 1910 Ocean Way; Santa Monica, CA
- Opening: May 1, 1926
- Owner: Edward Thomas Collection of Hotels
- Operator: ETC Hotels

Design and construction
- Architect: Charles F. Plummer

Other information
- Number of rooms: 129
- Number of restaurants: 2

Website
- hotelcasadelmar.com
- Hotel Casa del Mar
- U.S. National Register of Historic Places
- Coordinates: 34°0′23.6″N 118°29′27.3″W
- Architectural style: Renaissance
- NRHP reference No.: 00001169
- Added to NRHP: September 29, 2000

The Hotel Casa del Mar is a historic luxury hotel located on the beach in Santa Monica, California. It is owned and operated by the Edward Thomas Collection of Hotels (ETC Hotels).

== History ==
The building was constructed by brothers E.A. "Jack" Harter and T.D. "Til" Harter, doing business as the H & H Holding Company, at a cost of $2 million. It opened as Club Casa del Mar, a private beach club, on May 1, 1926. Designed by Los Angeles architect Charles F. Plummer to reflect an Italian Renaissance Revival aesthetic, the glory days of the hotel spanned 1926-41, as it became one of the most successful beach clubs in Southern California, popular with socialites and Hollywood celebrities. In 1941, the US Navy took over the building, utilizing it for enlisted soldiers during World War II. By 1960, the hotel was shuttered. In 1967, Charles E. Dederich reopened the building as the Synanon Foundation, a drug rehabilitation program. In 1978, Nathan Pritikin turned the building into the Pritikin Longevity Center, a nutrition and health care facility that closed in 1997.

The Edward Thomas Hospitality Corporation, owners of the adjacent Shutters on the Beach Hotel, acquired the property in November 1997 and spent over $50 million restoring and converting it into a luxury hotel. Architecture firms HLW International and Thomson Design Associates worked to preserve the interior and exterior of the seven-story building, reviving the hotel's original 1920s European style. It reopened as Hotel Casa del Mar in October 1999.

In February 2008, designer Darrell Schmitt completed a multimillion-dollar remodel of all 129 guest rooms and suites, adding new furniture, artwork, flat-screen televisions, windows, wallpaper, mirrors and drapes. Los Angeles magazine said the renovation had restored the hotel "to its Gatsbyesque glory."

In 2014, designer Michael S. Smith redesigned the hotel's lobby, introducing striped cabana-style sitting areas in the lobby and coast-themed artwork, among other additions. During the two-month redesign, a large, temporary street art installation was installed in the lobby. The piece of art, titled Absinthe and The Elephants, was created by local street artist Jules Muck, serving as camouflage for the lobby's central bar area during renovations.

The hotel is on the National Register of Historic Places. It was also inducted into Historic Hotels of America, an official program of the National Trust for Historic Preservation, in 2018, and, in 2023 is still a member.

== Design and amenities ==
The hotel has 129 rooms, a curving double staircase, a high coffered ceiling, mosaic tile floors and glowing copper sconces atop mahogany pillars in the lobby. It also has a spa that offers massages, and a fitness center. The Colonnade Ballroom, with floor-to-ceiling windows facing the ocean, seats up to 270 guests. The lobby and pool look out onto the Pacific Ocean.

In June 2015, the hotel introduced a new stress management program for guests and other groups, Automatic Integrative Relaxation Response, designed by stress management expert John Sahakian. The program includes yoga, mindfulness and breathing exercises.

== Dining ==
The Lobby Lounge features live music, plush seating and luxurious semi-private cabanas. In 2014, Michael S. Smith redesigned the hotel's new restaurant, Terrazza, which has a menu and style inspired by the Italian coast, with floor-to-ceiling windows overlooking the ocean.

== See also ==
- Santa Monica Army Air Forces Redistribution Center
