= MCL Cafeterias =

Restaurant chain based in Indianapolis, Indiana, US

MCL Restaurant & Bakery
- Formerly: MCL Cafeterias
- Company type: Private
- Industry: Restaurant
- Founded: 1950; 76 years ago in Indianapolis, Indiana
- Founders: Charles O. McGaughey; George Laughner
- Headquarters: Indianapolis, Indiana, US
- Products: American food
- Owners: McGaughey family
- Website: mclhomemade.com

MCL Restaurant & Bakery, formerly known as MCL Cafeterias, is a chain of American cafeteria-style restaurants based in Indianapolis. As of February 2026, the company operates 11 locations in Indiana and Ohio.

== Background ==
The company began in 1950 with a single cafeteria in Indianapolis, Indiana, founded by Charles O. McGaughey and George Laughner. MCL is an abbreviation of their two names. Today, the chain operates locations in Indiana, and Ohio. It is a privately owned company, now exclusively owned by the McGaughey family. In 2007, MCL Cafeterias changed the brand to "MCL Restaurant and Bakery", although no fundamental changes were made in production. MCL competed with Laughner's Cafeteria, which was founded by a cousin.

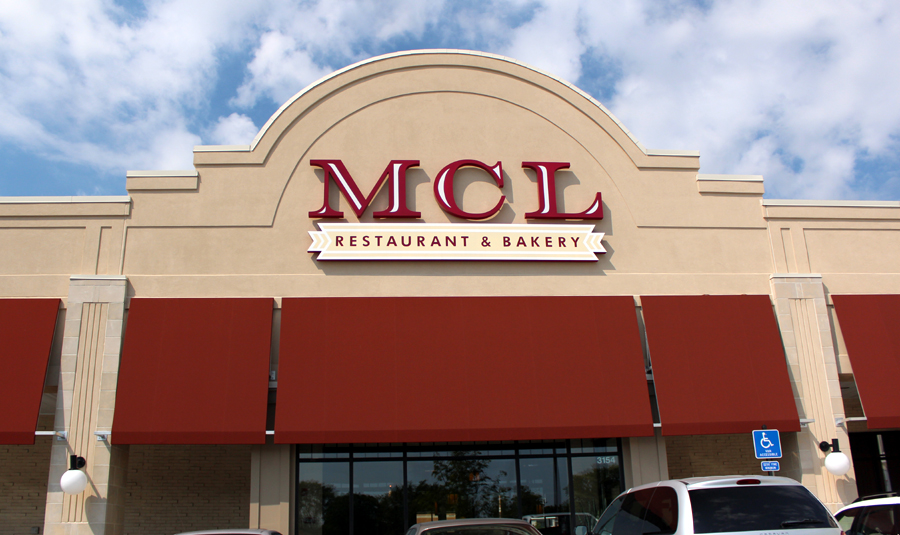
MCL Cafeteria at the Kingsdale Shopping Center in Upper Arlington, Ohio

== See also ==
- List of cafeterias
