= Santa Monica Army Air Forces Redistribution Center =

World War II complex in Santa Monica, California

Coordinates: 34°0′23.6″N 118°29′27.3″W

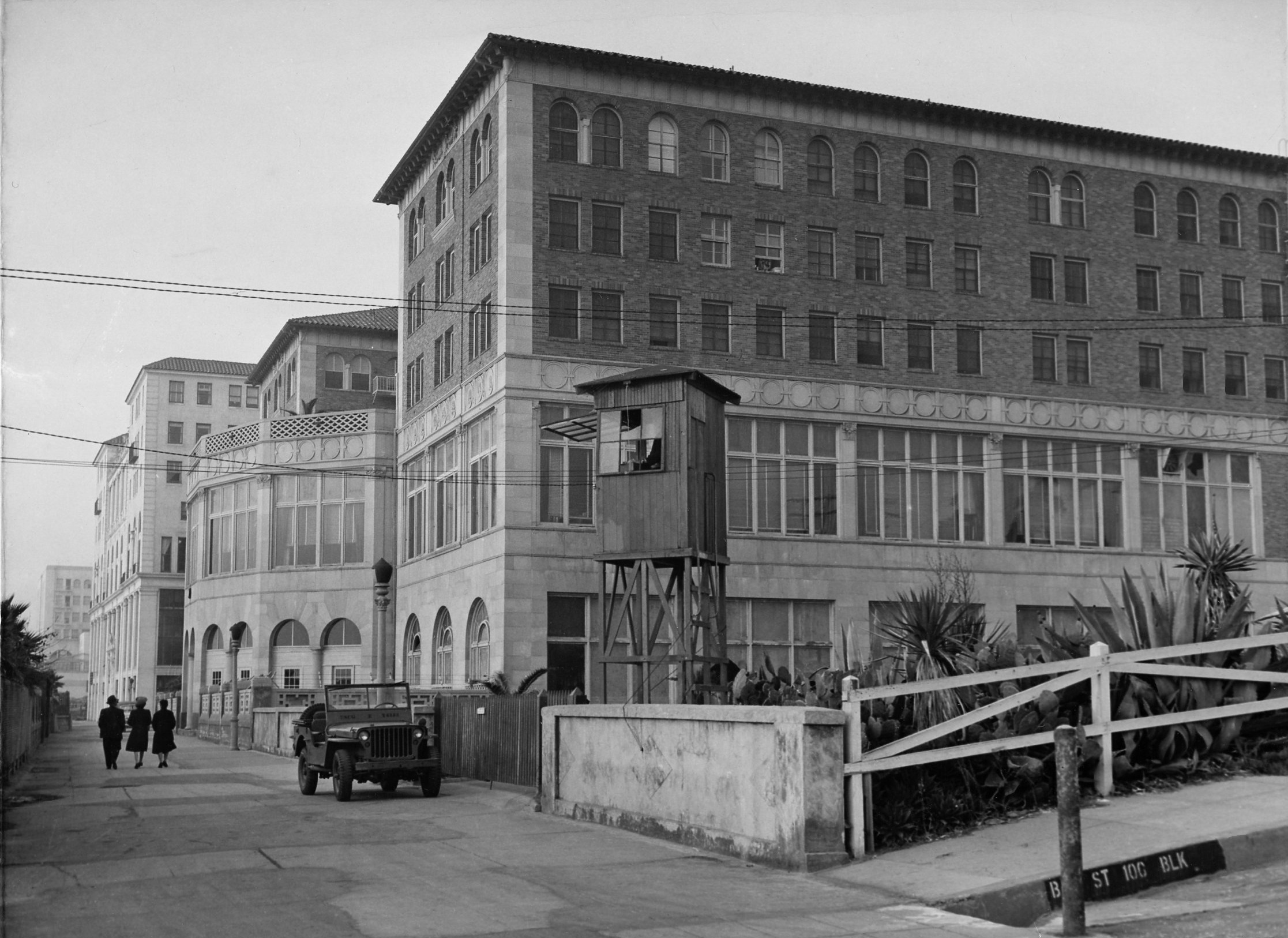
Santa Monica Army Air Forces Redistribution Center buildings: Del Mar Beach Club, then Edgewater Beach Club and in the back The Grand Hotel

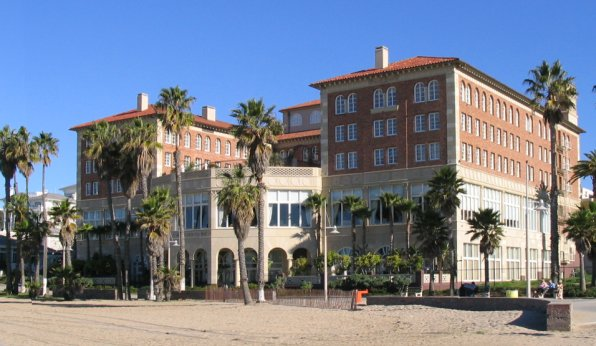
Casa del Mar Santa Monica

Santa Monica Army Air Forces Redistribution Center or Redistribution Station No.3 was a complex of buildings and hotels located in Santa Monica, California used to house troops during and after World War 2. US Army Air Force picked the Santa Monica site as Douglas Aircraft Company has a large Aerospace manufacturer operated there at Clover Field, also called Santa Monica Army Air Base). Opened in November 1943, the Redistribution opened out of leased buildings and land, most on what is now the Santa Monica State Beach. Crews rotation from Europe war and the Pacific War were able to rest and relax before their next assignment. At its peak, the complex covered 65 acres and had a staff of 1,200. Many of the staff at the center were from the Women's Army Corps. Organized social events were put on by the Santa Monica-Ocean Park chapter of the American Red Cross. At the end of the war, the complex became a processing center for troops heading home. Over 35,000 airmen had been processed at the center. Next, the complex processed prisoners of war heading home. The complex was deactivated on 15 November 1945 and the last leased building was closed in January 1947. Most of the buildings are in what is called Ocean Park, California on Ocean Avenue. The Army Air Force operated other Redistribution Centers in Atlantic City, Miami, San Antonio, Greensboro and Santa Ana, California at Camp Davis.

== Facilities ==
- The Elk's Club at 1811 Ocean Avenue (closed October 5, 1945)
- The Grand Hotel at 1725 Ocean Avenue (closed October 16, 1945, taken down in 1996)
- The Hotel Casa del Mar at 1910 Ocean Avenue (vacated October 29, 1945)
- The Fairmont-Miramar Hotel at 1123 Ocean Avenue, for married enlisted men (vacated October 13, 1945)
- The Edgewater Beach Club at 1815 Ocean Avenue (vacated October 29, 1945)
- The Hotel Shangri-La at 1301 Ocean Avenue (vacated October 11, 1945)
- The Ocean Palms Apartments at 1215 Ocean Avenue
- Apartment housing at 24th Street and Pico Boulevard
- Apartment housing at 25th and Pearl Streets
- Small Station Hospital
- Two office buildings at 27th Street and Dewey Street
- Warehouse at 1231 Lincoln Boulevard (7,500 square feet)
- Warehouse at 1405 11th Street
- Warehouse at 2435 Main Street
- Oil station at 1705 Lincoln Boulevard (11,000 square feet)
- (Castle Hot Springs in Arizona, due to shortage at Santa Monica) (vacated 3 July 1944)
- 11 Vacant lots, developed into:
  - Skeet range
  - Athletic field
  - Park
  - Parking lots
  - Army Beach at 1815 Ocean Avenue
- Part of the Santa Monica Pier was also used in 1945.

== See also ==
- California during World War II
- American Theater (1939–1945)
- Desert Training Center
- United States home front during World War II
- DeWitt General Hospital
