= Laughner's Cafeteria =

Defunct restaurant chain based in Indiana, U.S.

Laughner's Cafeteria was an Indianapolis, Indiana-based cafeteria-style restaurant chain.

== History ==
Laughner's Cafeterias roots trace to 1888 with the opening of Laughner & Perry Confectionary. It was a joint venture between William Jonathon Wesley Laughner (Jonathon) and William J. Perry. Laughner later bought out his partner in 1892, and in 1900 opened Laughner's Dairy Lunch, also in Indianapolis. Jonathon's brothers, George A., Ora and Elmer, all entered the business. Jonathon and his son Claude opened a restaurant together, and Claude's five children later joined the business. Claude introduced the cafeteria-style restaurant concept in 1920. His sons, Charles, Lloyd, and Richard, formed Laughner Brothers. A cousin was involved in the founding of rival MCL Cafeterias.

== Concepts ==
Laughner Brothers attempted to enter the fast food business with two different drive-ins, one of which was called Laughner's Steer-In, but they were not successful. Besides the Laughner's Cafeterias, they opened the Dutch Oven in 1971, a pie shop and cafe, Jonathon's Restaurant and Pub, a full-service restaurant, in 1978, The Oven and Classic U.S. Foods.

== Decline ==
Cafeteria-style restaurants began to decline in popularity in the 1980s, and Laughner's was hit by this decline. They began closing the out-lying restaurants and gradually retreated to Indianapolis. The last cafeteria closed in 2000. Over its 112-year history, four-decades of the Laughner family served in the company.

== Loon Lake Lodge ==
Charles "Chip" Laughner Jr., the last CEO of Laughner's, converted one of the newer Laughner's Cafeterias to a new concept, Loon Lake Lodge, in 1998. Located in Castleton, Indiana in a high-traffic area, the lodge-themed restaurant served traditional American fare with twists. Rattlesnake and pheasant were on the menu, as well as elk and venison. This venture was spun off as a separate family-owned company, Laughner Investments, headed by Chip.

In the summer of 2010 the Laughner family closed the Loon Lake Lodge, wilderness-themed restaurant, ending a 122-year run in the restaurant business for the Laughners in Indiana. The Laughners cited declining sales and health problems as the reason.

== See also ==
- List of cafeterias
