= Petitfils-Boos House =

Historic house in California, United States

- Boos House
- U.S. National Register of Historic Places
- Los Angeles Historic-Cultural Monument
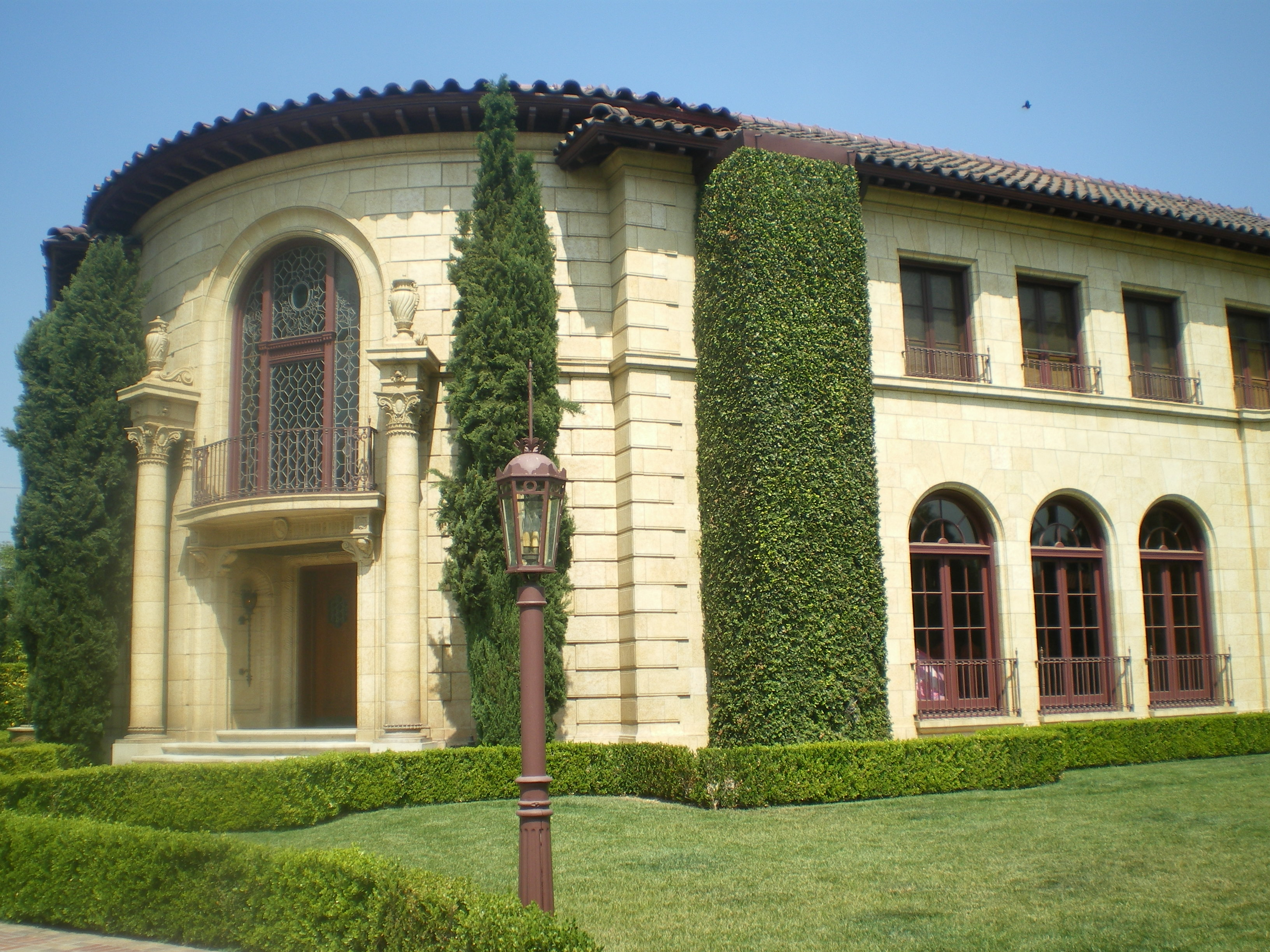
- Boos House, 2008

- Location within the Los Angeles metropolitan area Location within California Location within the United States
- Location: 545 Plymouth Boulevard, Los Angeles, California 90020
- Coordinates: 34°3′51″N 118°19′19″W
- Built: 1922
- Architect: Charles F. Plummer
- Architectural style: Italian Renaissance Revival
- NRHP reference No.: 05000049
- LAHCM No.: 835

Significant dates
- Added to NRHP: February 15, 2005
- Designated LAHCM: 2006-01-25

The Boos House is an Italian Renaissance Revival mansion in the Hancock Park section of Los Angeles, California. It was designed by Charles F. Plummer and built in 1922.

In 2005, the house was added to the National Register of Historic Places based on architectural criteria.

== See also ==
- National Register of Historic Places listings in Los Angeles
- List of Los Angeles Historic-Cultural Monuments in the Wilshire and Westlake areas
