= Antioch Crossing =

Antioch Center
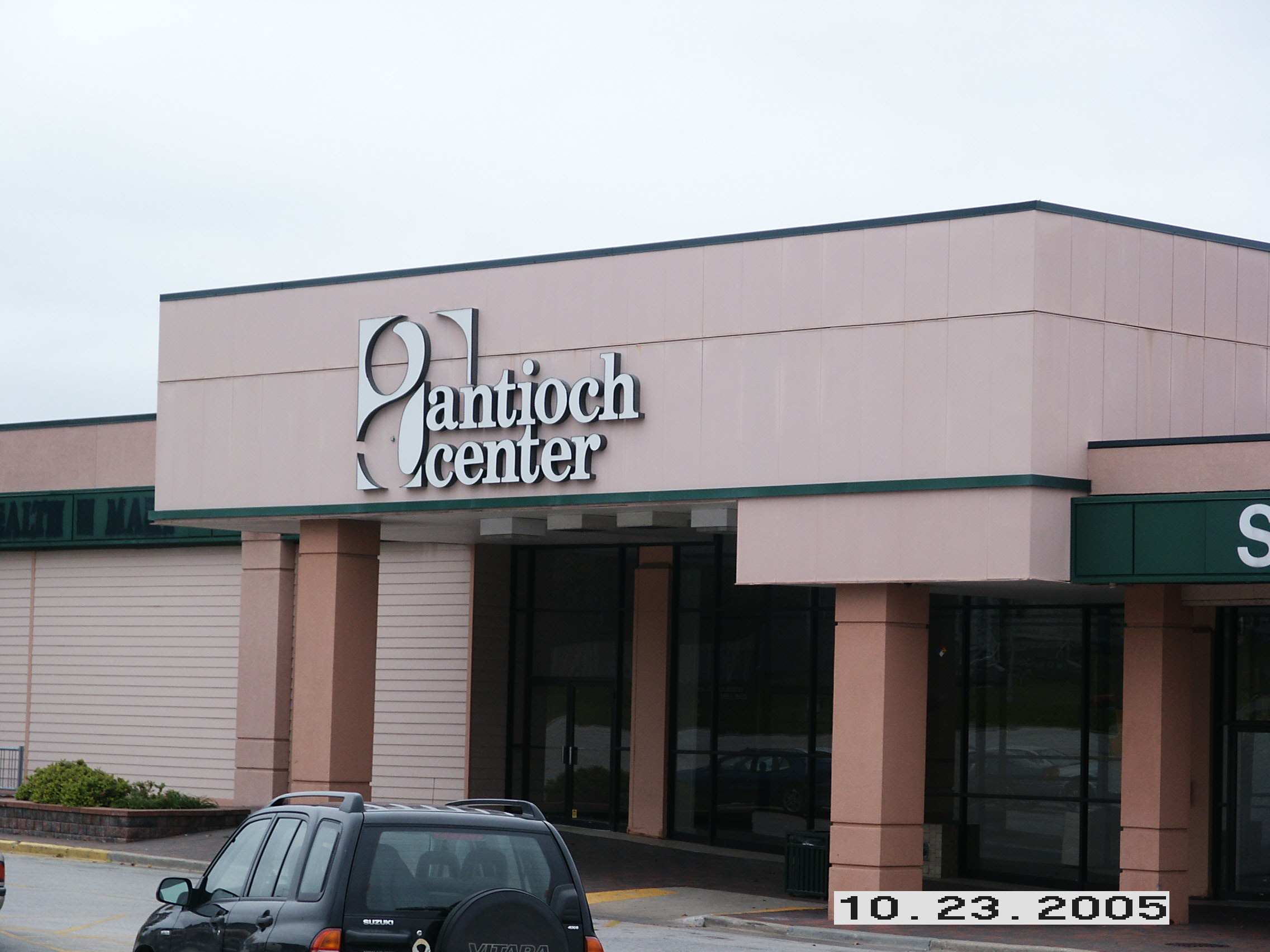
- Antioch Center on Antioch Crossing's current site
- Location: Kansas City, Missouri, USA
- Coordinates: 39°11′31″N 94°32′49″W
- Opened: 1956
- Demolished: 2012
- Owner: Antioch Redevelopment Partners, LLC
- Num. of anchor tenants: 2 (1 open, 1 vacant)
- Floor area: 800,000 square feet (74,000 m^{2})
- Floors: 1
- Public transit: RideKC

Antioch Crossing is a shopping center in Kansas City, Missouri on the site of the former Antioch Center, a mall which opened in 1956 and became nearly vacant by 2005. The majority of the former dead mall was demolished in January 2012, with the exception of two anchor stores (Burlington Coat Factory and Sears), and redevelopment on the site began in 2014. The shopping center is currently anchored by Burlington Coat Factory, Walmart Neighborhood Market, Vintage Stock, and a vacant space previously occupied by Sears until July 2017.

== Antioch Center ==
Antioch Center was a shopping mall located in the northern part of Kansas City, Missouri, United States, just south of the border for Gladstone, MO. The mall began business as an open-air shopping center in 1956, with about 80 store spaces on two levels. In 1974, a Sears store was added. Further renovation came in 1978, when the mall was fully enclosed. After the enclosure, most of the stores had both an interior entrance, as well as an exterior entrance. Macy's (Kansas City division) was an original anchor store. It was converted to the Dillard's nameplate in 1986 and that of Burlington Coat Factory in 1992. Other anchor stores that operated at the mall included Levitz Furniture, as well as Payless Cashways, a home improvement store. Antioch Center was also once home to the first location for ShowBiz Pizza Place, which later converted into Chuck E. Cheese's in the early 1990s. Antioch Center also housed a branch of the Forum Cafeterias, the chain's first suburban location.

In mid-1990s, the mall began a downward spiral and became increasingly vacant, until the only remaining stores were Sears, Burlington Coat Factory, and Catherine's Plus Sizes. Plans were announced in October 2004 to rebuild the dying mall as a 450,000-square-foot (42,000 m^{2}) open-air, mixed use complex, consisting of several big-box stores. This redevelopment was stymied by the economic recession of the late 2000s and was not carried out. Inside access to Antioch Center was ultimately blocked off and the mall sat empty for several years until it was finally demolished in January 2012, leaving only Sears and Burlington Coat Factory standing.

In 2014, the center was renamed Antioch Crossing, and a redevelopment project began at the site. Walmart Neighborhood Market opened at the site in late 2014, while Vintage Stock and other retailers opened in 2015 and beyond.

On May 16, 2017, it was announced that Sears would be closing as part of a plan to close 30 stores nationwide. The store closed in July 2017.

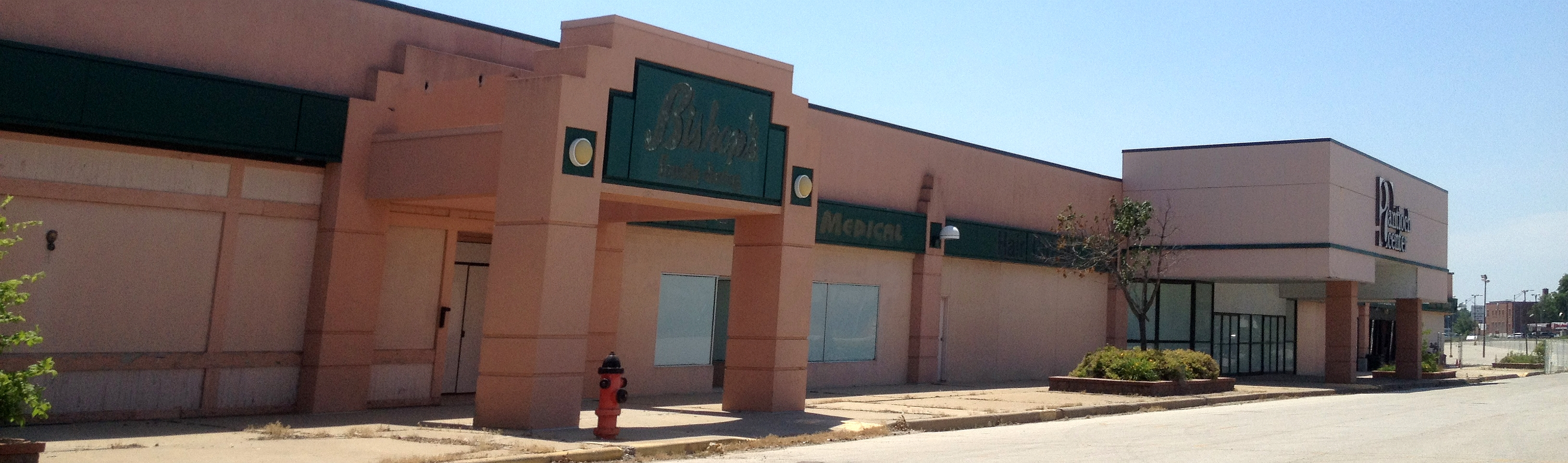
Antioch Center

== See also ==
- Media related to Antioch Center at Wikimedia Commons
