= Waldorf System =

Lunchroom chain in New England

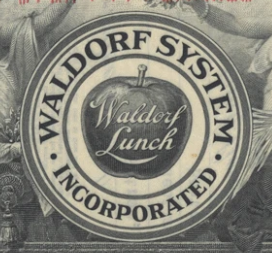
Logo of the Waldorf System

Waldorf System, Incorporated was the first lunchroom chain in New England, founded by Harry Seymour Kelsey in Springfield, Massachusetts in 1903. It was named after the Waldorf Hotel in New York City. Its trademark was the Red Apple.

It expanded rapidly. In its first 12 years, it had 23 locations in Boston and Cambridge and 37 more elsewhere in New England. At its peak, it had around 200 locations in seven states. Its headquarters moved to 169 High Street, Boston. The stores were often called "Waldorf Lunch".

The foundation idea of the Waldorf system is this: the undeviating purpose to maintain worthy dining-places where they will perform real public service, the purpose to serve tasteful food of unquestionable quality to men and women at such small profit per person that we shall have many patrons to make those small profits profitable to our employees and shareholders.

— 1922 advertisement

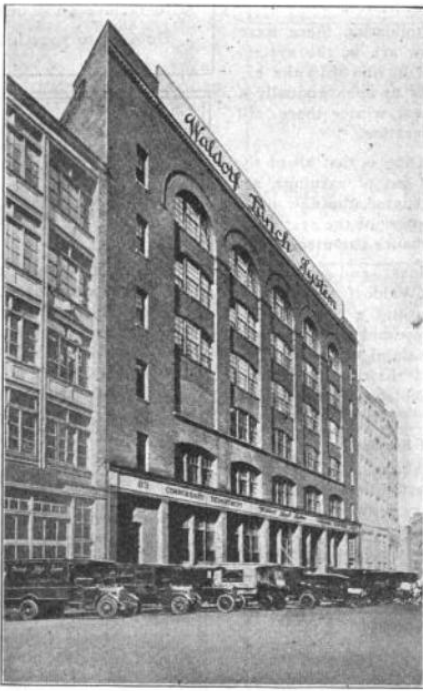
A Waldorf System Commissary, 1920

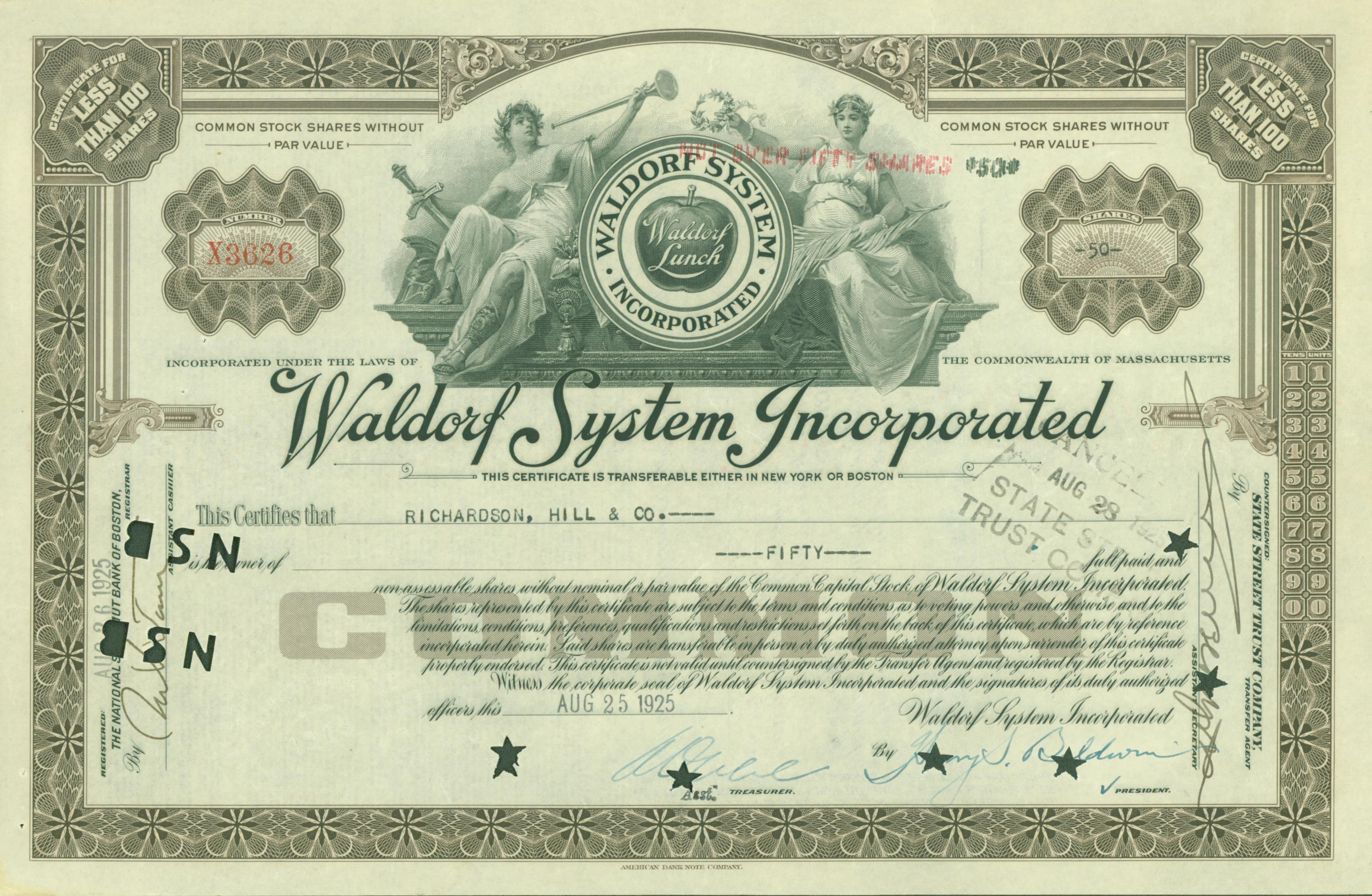
Share of the Waldorf System Incorporated, issued 25 August 1925

Waldorf prepared most foods in central kitchens which distributed individually wrapped portions to its restaurants for reheating and browning. In 1918, its main commissary occupied the whole of 69 Purchase Street, Boston, a total of 65,000 square feet of floor space, and had 100 employees, working 24 hours a day. Later, each of its geographical divisions had a commissary. Restaurants also did short order cooking for items such as hamburgers and ham and eggs.

Menus were distributed weekly from headquarters. Waldorf ran a central purchasing operation with strict specifications and bought in quantity. For example, it once purchased 14 carloads of turkeys. Headquarters also specified detailed portion sizes.

Service was from individual stands run by a "lunch man" and displaying all the menu items except the hot ones, which were ordered from the kitchen. Unlike most cafeterias, there was no tray rail.

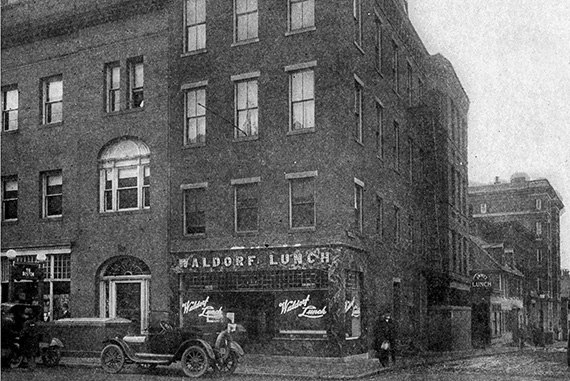
Waldorf Lunch, Harvard Square, 1918

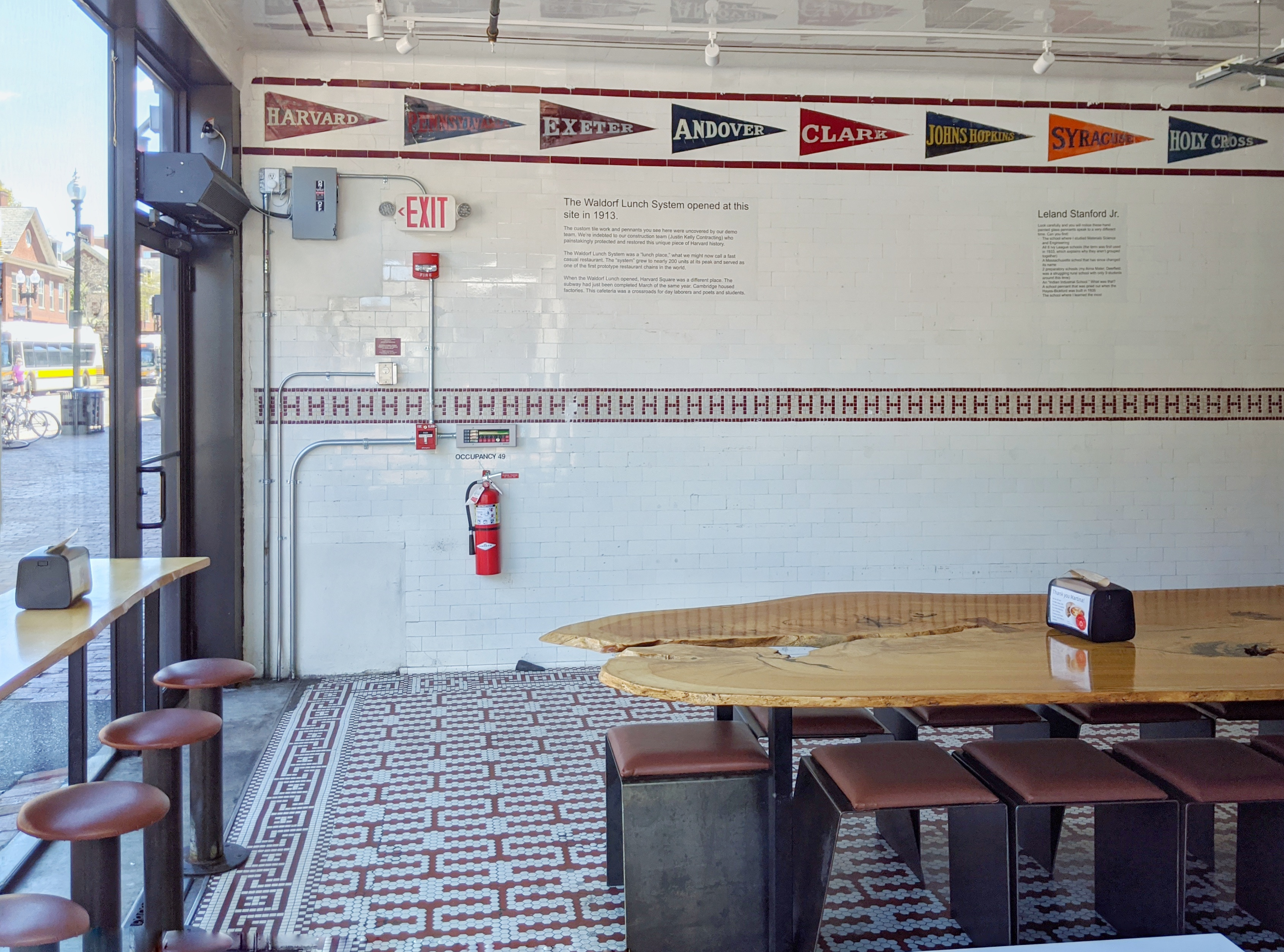
Interior, Harvard Square, 1913 tile

The Harvard Square location opened in 1913 and closed in 1938, when it became a Hayes-Bickford cafeteria. In 2017, when the space was being renovated to become a branch of the local Clover Food Lab chain, the original Waldorf decor, with college pennants in tile, was exposed.

Besides operating retail restaurants, the Waldorf System built and operated company lunchrooms.

In 1919, the Waldorf company went public. By then, it had 38 stores and had acquired Kinney & Woodward (14 stores) and Baldwin's (7), also founded in Springfield from 1904-1909. In 1919, Waldorf acquired the assets of the Automat Company, a local automat restaurant, and in 1924 converted the Little Building location to cafeteria format. It also acquired the Clark Restaurant Company (1922, restaurants in Ohio), the Ginter Restaurant Company (1927, Boston table service restaurants), St. Clairs', Inc. (1929, Massachusetts table service restaurants), and the Fort Hill Supply Company (1927, restaurant equipment). In 1921, Samuel Bickford, a Waldorf vice-president, left to start his own lunchroom business in New York, Bickford's Lunch. Bickford's later merged with Hayes lunch, and Hayes-Bickford restaurants were often near Waldorf restaurants, and competed.

The Waldorf System was publicly traded until it was acquired by Restaurant Associates in the 1960s, and the brand disappeared in the 1970s.
