= Young's Market Company Building =

- U.S. National Register of Historic Places
- Los Angeles Historic-Cultural Monument
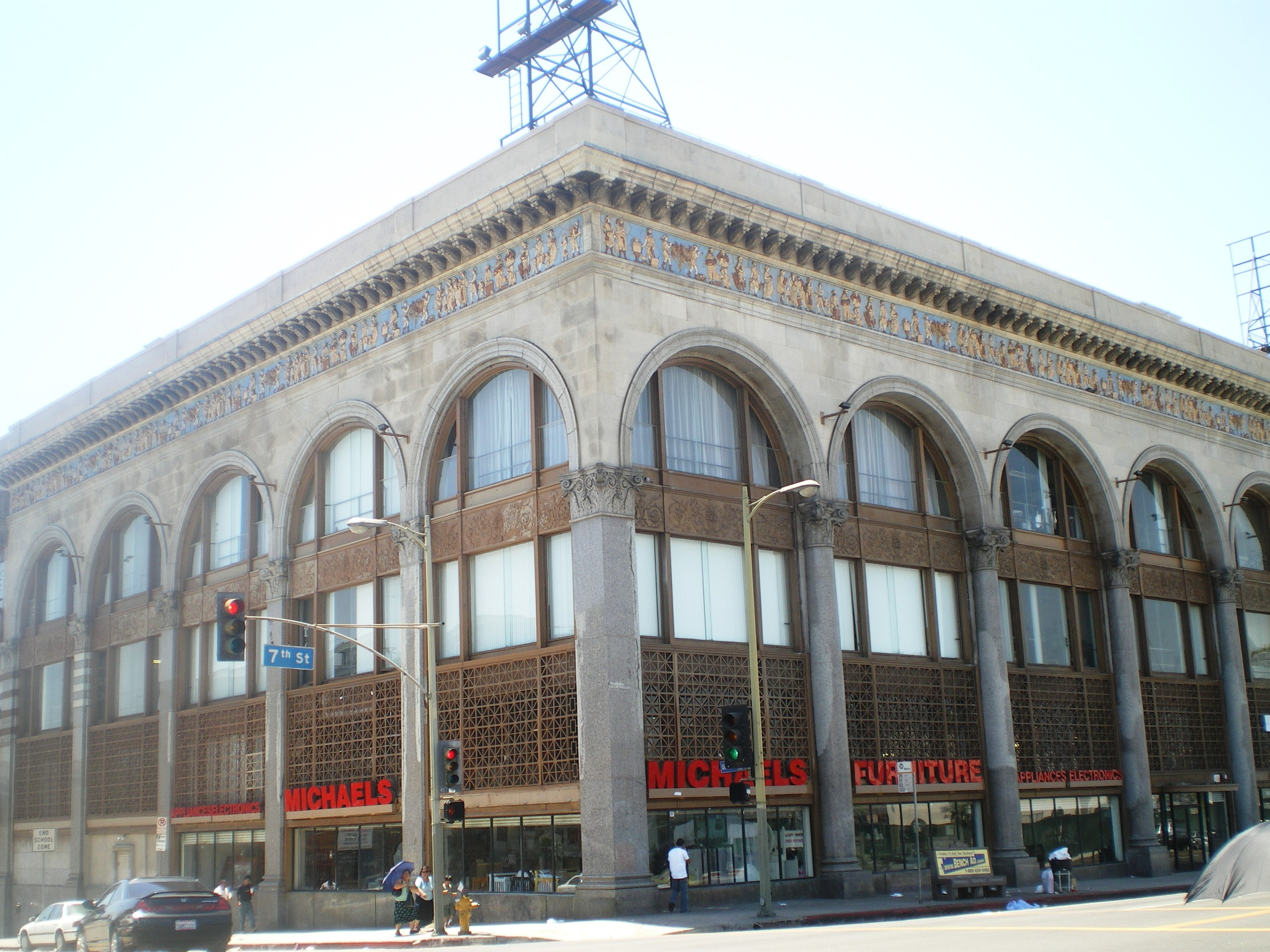
- Young's Market Building in 2008

- Location within the Los Angeles metropolitan area Location within California Location within the United States
- Location: 1610 W. Seventh St., Westlake district, Los Angeles, California
- Coordinates: 34°3′14″N 118°16′14″W
- Built: 1924
- Architect: Charles F. Plummer
- Architectural style: Spanish Renaissance Revival
- NRHP reference No.: 04000595
- LAHCM No.: 113

Significant dates
- Added to NRHP: June 15, 2004
- Designated LAHCM: March 7, 1973

Young's Market Company Building built in 1924 is a historic building located at 1610 West 7th Street, corner South Union Avenue, in the Westlake neighborhood of Los Angeles, California.

It was originally a retail market and office building, designed by architect Charles F. Plummer.

It has been renovated into 44 live-work lofts in 1997.

The Young's Market Company Building commercial block is a Los Angeles Historic-Cultural Monument. On June 15, 2004, it was added to the National Register of Historic Places.

== See also ==
- List of Los Angeles Historic-Cultural Monuments in the Wilshire and Westlake areas
- List of Registered Historic Places in Los Angeles
