= Bickford's (restaurant) =

Chain of US cafeteria restaurants

- Founded: 1921
- Founder: Samuel Longley Bickford

Bickford's Restaurants and Cafeterias is a chain of cafeteria-style restaurants founded in 1921. From the 1920s through the 1970s, the chain was a mainstay in the New York City area. From the 1970s through the 2000s, the chain was primarily located in the New England area. As of August 2026, the company operates one location in Massachusetts.

Bickford's and Foster's Cafeterias influenced Jack Kerouac, Allen Ginsberg, Peter Orlovsky, Woody Allen, Andy Warhol, William Styron, and Herbert Huncke.

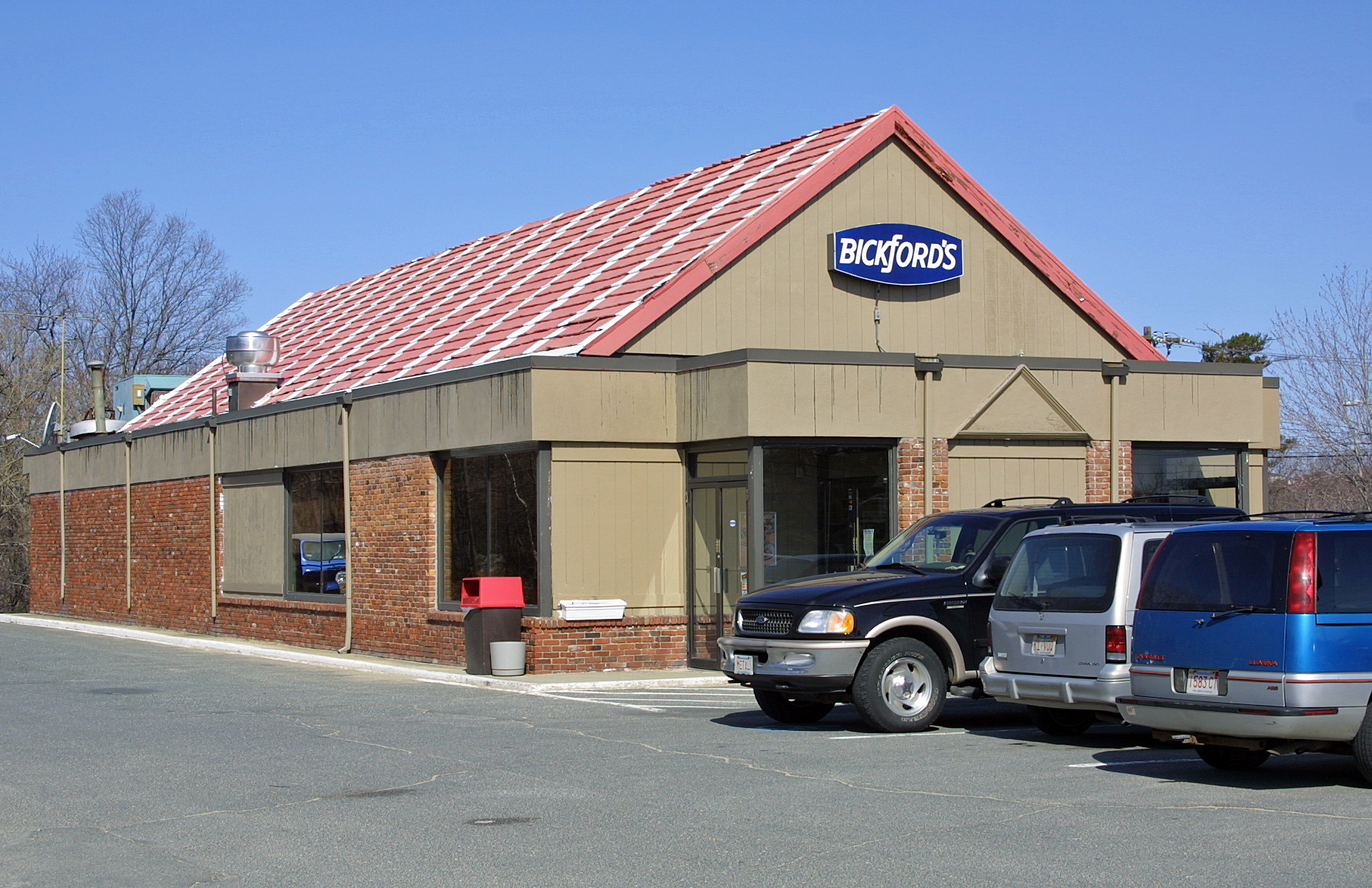
Bickford's Restaurant Rt.1, Saugus, Massachusetts, 2001

== Lunchrooms ==
Samuel Longley Bickford (1885–1959) began his restaurant career in 1902. In the 1910s, he was a vice president at the Waldorf System lunchroom chain in New England and, in 1921, he established his own quick-lunch Bickford's restaurants in New York. Bickford's lunchrooms offered modestly priced fare and extended hours. Bickford's architect was F. Russell Stuckert, who had been associated with Samuel Bickford since 1917. Stuckert's father, J. Franklin Stuckert, had designed buildings for Horn & Hardart in the 1890s.

During the 1920s, the Bickford's chain expanded rapidly with 24 lunchrooms in the New York area and others around Boston. It also acquired Travelers' Lunch, which had been established by Bickford's brother Harold, the White Lunch System on the West Coast, and the Hayes Lunch System in Boston, which was renamed Hayes-Bickford.

A letter with a company stock offering stated, "The lunchrooms operated are of the self-service type and serve a limited bill of fare, which makes possible the maximum use of equipment and a rapid turnover. Emphasis is placed on serving meals of high quality at moderate cost." A 1964 New York City guidebook noted:

Breakfast at Bickford's is an old New York custom. In these centrally located, speedy-service, modestly-priced restaurants a torrent of traffic is sustained for a generous span of hours with patrons who live so many different lives on so many different shifts.

== Expansion ==
With Bickford's restaurants opening in New Jersey and Massachusetts, Sam Bickford and his son, Harold, worked over four decades to expand their cafeteria chain throughout the Northeast. As their expansion continued with drive-in restaurants and associated locations in Florida, Pennsylvania and California, they ultimately opened 85 branches.

In the 1930s, union conflicts resulted in vandalism:

In 1932 the police blamed members of the glaziers union for vandalism against 24 Horn & Hardart and Bickford's restaurants in Manhattan, including the one at 488 Eighth Avenue. Witnesses said that a passenger in a car driving by used a slingshot to damage and even break the plate glass show windows. Glaziers union representatives had complained about nonunion employees installing glass at the restaurants.

Bickford's son, Harold, was in charge of expanding their cafeteria chain into Florida and California. In 1959, Bickford's, Inc. had two geographical divisions: the North-East Coast Division and the South East Coast (M&M Cafeterias, Inc) and West Coast (Foster's Lunch System, Ltd.) Division.

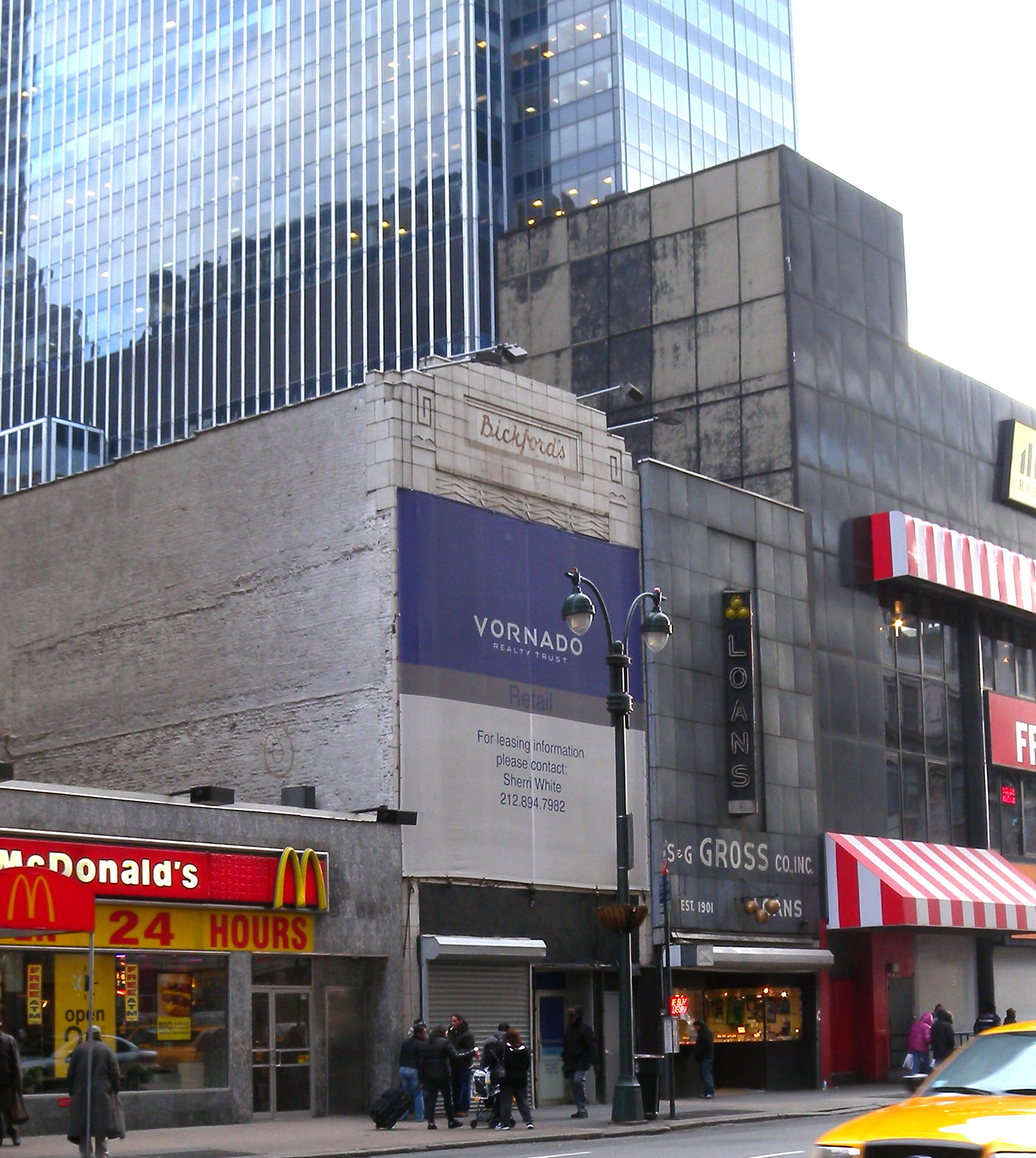
Former Bickford's, 488 Eighth Avenue, New York

== Decline ==
Bickford's and its Southeast subsidiary M&M Cafeterias and West Coast subsidiary Foster's Cafeterias had trouble staying in business because of rising labor costs, competition from the non-union labor at fast food restaurants, and rising crime, which kept people home after dark. In 1960, there were 48 Bickford's in New York, down to 42 in 1970 and only two in 1980. By 1982, the last two were closed as well.

== Evolution ==
In October 1959, in Peabody, Massachusetts, Harold Bickford introduced a new concept, the Bickford's Pancake House, a specialty family restaurant with an emphasis on the breakfast menu. Over the next three decades, the Bickford's Pancake House chain grew to 30 restaurants throughout New England. By the mid-1990s, there were almost 70 Bickford's restaurants in New Hampshire, Vermont, Rhode Island, Connecticut and Massachusetts.

Bickford's corporate headquarters were eventually located in Brighton, Boston, Massachusetts. Financial forecaster Jeffrey S. Bickford, the grandson of the founder, maintains a website devoted to Bickford's nostalgia.

As of 2016, four locations remained, all in Massachusetts: Bickford's Grille, in Brockton, Burlington, and Woburn, and Bickford's Family Restaurant, in Acton. On December 30, 2018, the Brockton Bickford's Grille closed its doors after Tommy Doyle's Pub & Grill bought the restaurant building to expand their business. The Acton location closed in 2020, and the Woburn location closed in October 2024, leaving just the Burlington location in operation as of 2025.

== Foster's cafeterias ==
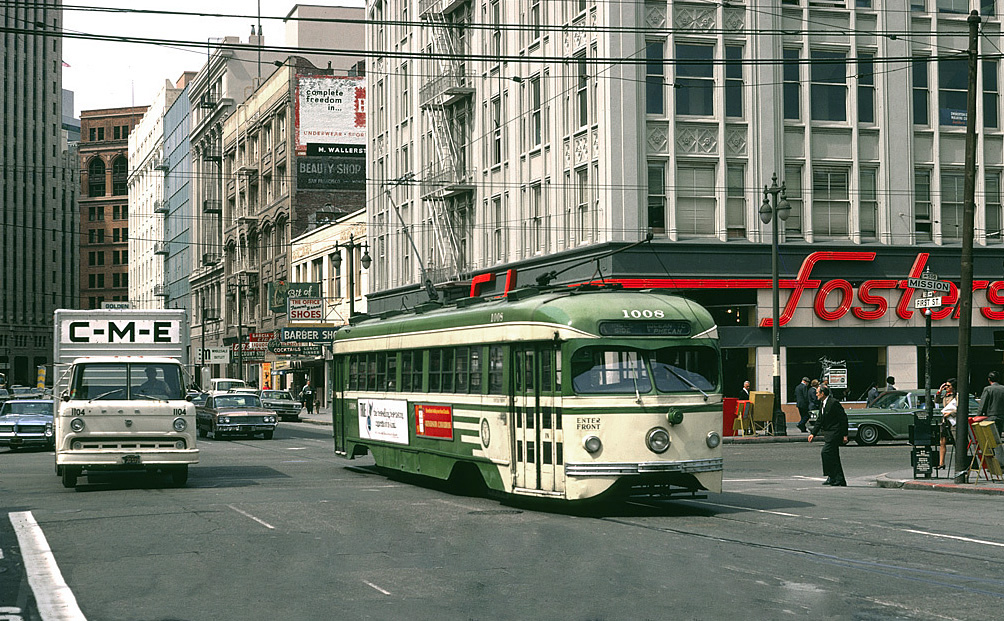
A streetcar passing a Foster's in San Francisco in 1970

Foster's Cafeterias were operated under Bickford's Foster's Lunch System, Ltd. subdivision, headquartered in San Francisco, California. By 1959, there were 28 Foster's Cafeterias & Bakeries in San Francisco and other locations in the San Francisco Bay Area, including Oakland, Berkeley and San Mateo. The Foster's Lunch System, Ltd. also operated the Moar's Cafeterias, in Hillsdale Shopping Center at 70 Hillsdale Plaza in San Mateo and 33 Powell Street, just north of the cable car turntable with a large mosaic by Benny Bufano on one wall.

Foster's cafeterias were known for Foster's English Muffins, sourdough English muffins that were sold packaged at the cafeterias to take home. These muffins were often mentioned by Herb Caen in his column. They were also sold in supermarkets and groceries.

== Literary References ==
=== Bickford's ===
Jack Kerouac sometimes wrote while sitting in Bickford's, and he mentioned the restaurant in Lonesome Traveler. Other members of the Beat Generation could be found at night in the New York Bickford's:

The best minds of Allen Ginsberg's generation "sank all night in submarine light of Bickford's," he wrote in Howl. The Beat Generation muse, Herbert Huncke, practically inhabited the Bickford's on West 42nd Street. Walker Evans photographed Bickford's customers, and Andy Warhol rhapsodized about Bickford's waitresses. Bickford's made its way into the work of writers as diverse as Woody Allen and William Styron.

=== Foster's ===
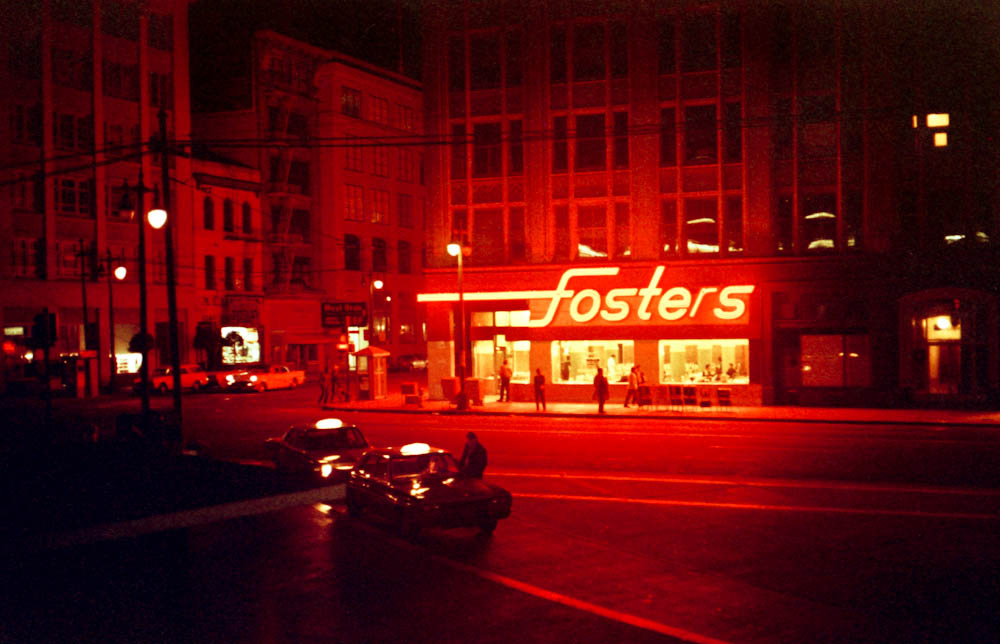
Foster's Cafeteria at Mission and 1st, San Francisco (1968)

Allen Ginsberg when he was living in San Francisco liked to go to the large Foster's cafeteria on the north side of Sutter between Powell and Stockton. He wrote the first section of Howl there in 1954. He took vows there about January 1955 with Peter Orlovsky to be his lover, their promise being "that neither of us would go into heaven unless we could get the other one in".

== See also ==
- List of cafeterias
