= Fairmont Miramar Hotel & Bungalows =

Hotel in Santa Monica, California, United States

Coordinates: 34.0179°N 118.5017°W

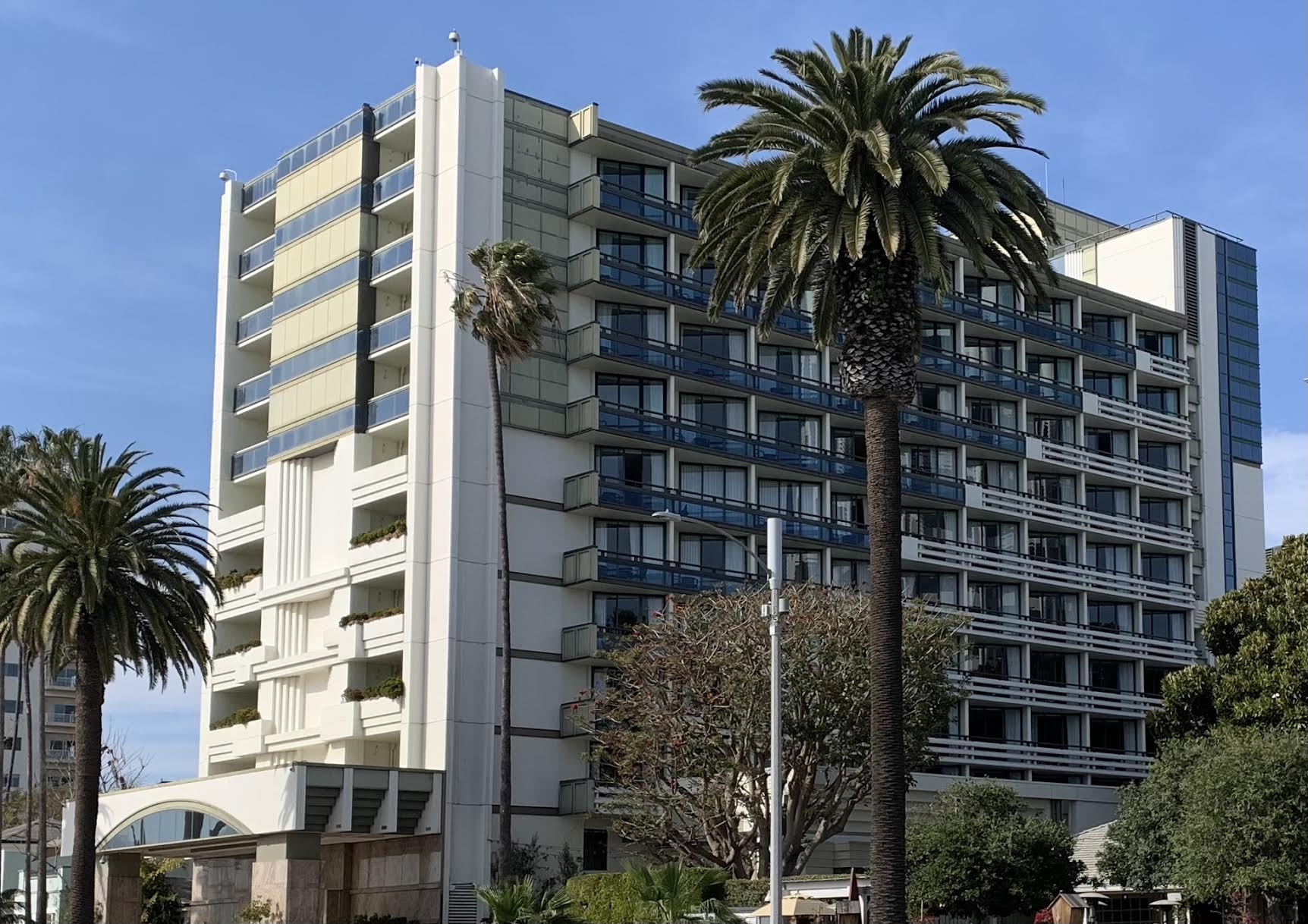
- The 1959 Ocean Tower wing of the Fairmont Miramar Hotel, 2021
- Interactive map of the Fairmont Miramar Hotel & Bungalows area
- Hotel chain: Fairmont Hotels and Resorts

General information
- Location: United States, 101 Wilshire Boulevard, Santa Monica, California
- Opening: 1921
- Owner: MSD Capital
- Operator: Fairmont Raffles Hotels International

Technical details
- Floor count: 10

Other information
- Number of rooms: 302 (including suites)
- Number of suites: 32 bungalows
- Number of restaurants: 2

Website
- Fairmont Miramar

The Fairmont Miramar Hotel & Bungalows is a historic five-star hotel located near the beach in Santa Monica, California, not far from the Santa Monica Pier. The property was originally a private estate, built in 1889. It was converted to a hotel in 1921. The hotel is a member of Historic Hotels of America, an official program of the National Trust for Historic Preservation.

== History ==
John P. Jones, originally from Herefordshire, England, came to California in 1849. He made a fortune through silver mining, and in 1874, bought a three-quarter interest of Robert Symington Baker's ranch near Los Angeles. In 1875, Jones and Baker co-founded Santa Monica.

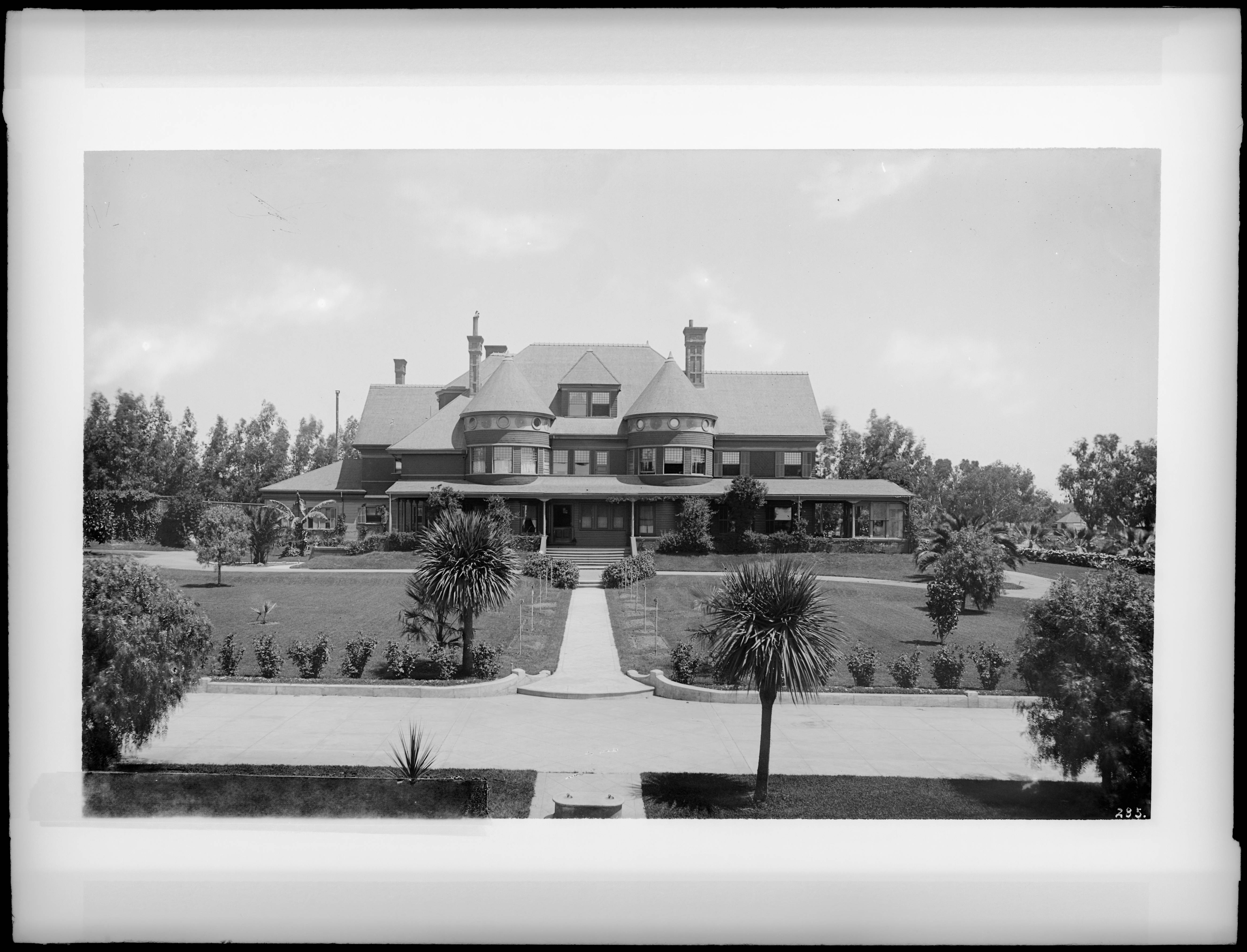
Senator Jones Residence in Santa Monica, ca.1890-1920

In 1889 Jones built a Victorian-style mansion as his family's residence, and named it Miramar, Spanish for "view of the ocean". His wife, Georgina, planted a rose garden near the house, and also planted trees along Santa Monica's streets. After John P. Jones died in 1912, his widow sold the family's mansion to King Camp Gillette, inventor of the safety razor, who leased the estate to a military academy at the end of World War I.

In 1921, Gillette sold the property to hotelier Gilbert Stevenson, who converted it into the Miramar Hotel. A new six-story wing was built in 1924, to provide apartments for longer stays at the beach. Greta Garbo was one of the first celebrities to move in, and she lived there for more than four years. In the 1930s, 32 poolside bungalows were built, separate from the main hotel buildings. Jean Harlow was seen dining at the hotel, and Betty Grable performed in the Miramar lounge with Ted Whidden's band. The original 1889 wing was demolished in 1939.

In 1959, the hotel's Ocean Tower, standing ten floors 115.96 feet (35.34 m) high, was constructed. The Miramar was sold to Fujita in 1973. They brought in Sheraton Hotels to manage the Miramar in 1978, when it was renamed the Miramar-Sheraton, and later the Miramar Sheraton Hotel. Fujita sold the hotel to Maritz, Wolff & Co., a Los Angeles-based investment firm, in September 1999 for $90.6 million, and they contracted with Fairmont Hotels to take over the hotel, which was renamed the Fairmont Miramar in November 1999. The hotel's historic bungalows underwent a $18 million renovation in 2002–2003, preserving the original design.

Maritz, Wolff sold the hotel to billionaire Michael Dell's MSD Capital for $210 million in 2006. In 2011, the new owners announced plans to demolish the existing structures and build a new hotel/residential complex on the site. The plans were revised to include a 21-story tower in 2013. However work was held back by concern from community members. This eventually led to a ballot initiative in 2016 that would have limited development, which was defeated. Plans for a scaled-down replacement hotel were unveiled on April 12, 2018. The new building, designed by Pelli Clarke Pelli Architects, will be 130 feet tall, the maximum allowable height following new restrictions. The California Coastal Commission approved the redevelopment plans on March 10, 2022. The project still needs approval from the Santa Monica Landmarks Commission and the Architectural Review Board. After that, construction is expected to take 33 months.

A strike by workers at the Fairmont Miramar and 12 other properties in the Los Angeles area began on August 30, 2023. The hotel was originally booked to host Inter Miami CF for their Major League Soccer match against Los Angeles FC, but the club cancelled their reservation in solidarity with the strike.

== See also ==
- Santa Monica Army Air Forces Redistribution Center
