= Shutters on the Beach Hotel =

Luxury beach hotel in Santa Monica, California, US

Shutters on the Beach

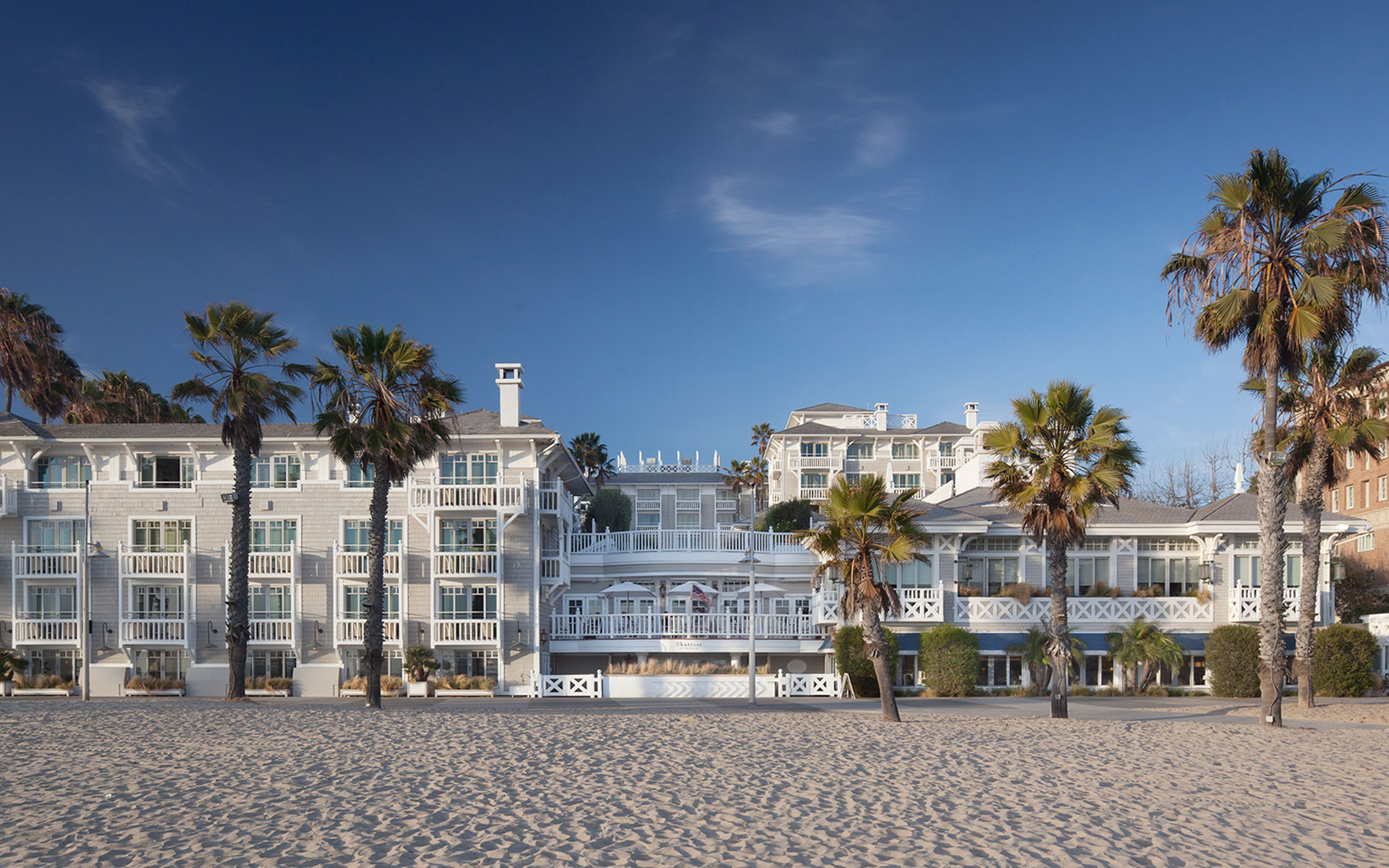
- Shutters on the Beach Hotel

- Location within the Los Angeles metropolitan area Location within California Location within the United States

General information
- Location: One Pico Blvd; Santa Monica, CA
- Coordinates: 34.0072417°N 118.4914179°W
- Opening: June 8, 1993
- Owner: Edward Thomas Collection of Hotels
- Operator: ETC Hotels

Technical details
- Floor count: 7

Design and construction
- Architect: Hill Architects

Other information
- Number of rooms: 186
- Number of suites: 12
- Number of restaurants: One Pico; Coast Beach Cafe & Bar

Website
- shuttersonthebeach.com

Shutters on the Beach is a luxury hotel located on the beach in Santa Monica, California. It is owned and operated by the Edward Thomas Collection of Hotels (ETC Hotels), which also owns the adjacent Hotel Casa del Mar. A member of The Leading Hotels of the World, Shutters on the Beach offers two restaurants: One Pico and Coast Beach Café and Bar.

== History ==
Shutters on the Beach opened on June 8, 1993, with 198 rooms, on Santa Monica's beachfront. It was built on property that had been occupied by various beach clubs since 1925, including the Edgewater Beach Club, Jonathan Club, Waverly Club and Ambassador Club. A new building, its Craftsman-style exterior was meant to reference Southern California resorts and cottages of the 1920s. At the time of its opening, it was the only hotel in Santa Monica with direct beach access.

== Design, style and amenities ==
Built by Hill Architects, the hotel has 186 guest rooms and 12 suites in its two buildings: the Ocean House, the larger of the two; and the Beach House, which sits right on the beach and contains the lobby, the two restaurants and the bar. Some rooms have fireplaces or jacuzzis. Four-poster beds, comfortable lounge chairs, walnut desks and nightstands, and custom-made white linens are signature aspects of the hotel's furnishings. The décor is typically described as "distinctively New England."

In 2005, interior designer Michael S. Smith was commissioned to re-invent the hotel rooms. He redesigned each of the 186 guest rooms and the 12 suites, as well as One, the hotel's spa.

Artists represented in the hotel's art collection include Jasper Johns, Frank Gehry, David Hockney, Roy Lichtenstein, Robert Motherwell, William Wegman, Richard Diebenkorn, Claes Oldenburg and Ellsworth Kelly. The hotel has partnered with famous designers, such as Joie; bicycles for guests with Kate Spade; and canvas tote bags with Clare Vivier.

Shutters on the Beach is known for being among the most environmentally friendly hotels in Los Angeles. In 2014, the hotel purchased the electric car 2014 Tesla S P85 as its official house car, available on a complimentary basis for guests staying in a luxury suite, the first hotel in Los Angeles to offer the car. During the Christmas holidays, the hotel offers to put Christmas trees in guest rooms.

In 2015, the hotel launched a partnership with yoga teacher, hypnotherapist and meditation teacher John Sahakian to create an exclusive program called AIRR (Automatic Integrated Relaxation Response), with group workshops and retreats to alleviate stress and improve responses to everyday obstacles.

== Restaurants ==
There are two restaurants at the hotel, One Pico and Coast Beach Café and Bar. The more formal One Pico has ocean views and a view of the Santa Monica Pier. The hotel's signature restaurant, One Pico opened in 1993 and was renovated by Michael S. Smith in the spring of 2008, and has a Wine Spectator award-winning wine list. Coast is casual and situated at beach level. It opened its doors in the summer of 2007 and was designed by Jim Gillam. The hotel also has a bar and lounge, The Living Room, in the lobby.

== In popular culture ==
In the 2003 film Something's Gotta Give, Shutters' One Pico restaurant stood in for a Hamptons, New York restaurant where Diane Keaton and Keanu Reeves's characters go on a date.

Shutters on the Beach has been referred to as "Hollywood's Beach House" and is known as a popular hotel and dining spot among Hollywood actors and actresses, with past celebrity sightings including Jennifer Aniston, Eva Longoria, Zac Efron, Ben Affleck, Brad Pitt, Angelina Jolie, Megan Fox, Dave Chappelle, Tim Robbins, Christian Bale and Julia Roberts.

== Honors and awards ==
- #83, Travel + Leisure Top 100 Hotels in Continental US & Canada, 2008
- Forbes Traveler 400, The World's Very Best Hotels and Resorts, 2008
- Travel + Leisure 500 World's Best Hotels, 2009
- Wine Spectator Award of Excellence, 2009 - 2015 (One Pico)
- #1, Huffington Post Best Southern California Coastal Getaways, 2010
- #14, Best Hotels in Los Angeles, 2013 (U.S. News & World Report)
- Conde Nast Traveler Gold List, World's Best Hotels, 2014
- Forbes Traveler Guide Four Star Awards, 2014
- #15, Best Los Angeles Hotels, 2015 (U.S. News & World Report)
- #65, Best California Hotels, 2015 (U.S. News & World Report)
- Most Iconic Beach Hotel, public vote, Beach Tomato
