= Charles F. Plummer =

American architect (1879–1939)

- Born: 1879
- Died: 1939 (aged 59–60)
- Occupation: Architect
- Buildings: Petitfils-Boos House; Young's Market Company Building; Hotel Casa del Mar

Charles F. Plummer (1879–1939) was an American architect, known for his work in and around Los Angeles, California. Many of his works have been listed as Los Angeles Historic-Cultural Monuments (LAHCM), in the National Register of Historic Places (NRHP), or both.

== Biography ==
Charles F. Plummer was born in 1879 and died in 1939. Plummer partnered with Walter C. Wurdeman and Welton Becket in the 1930s.

== List of works ==
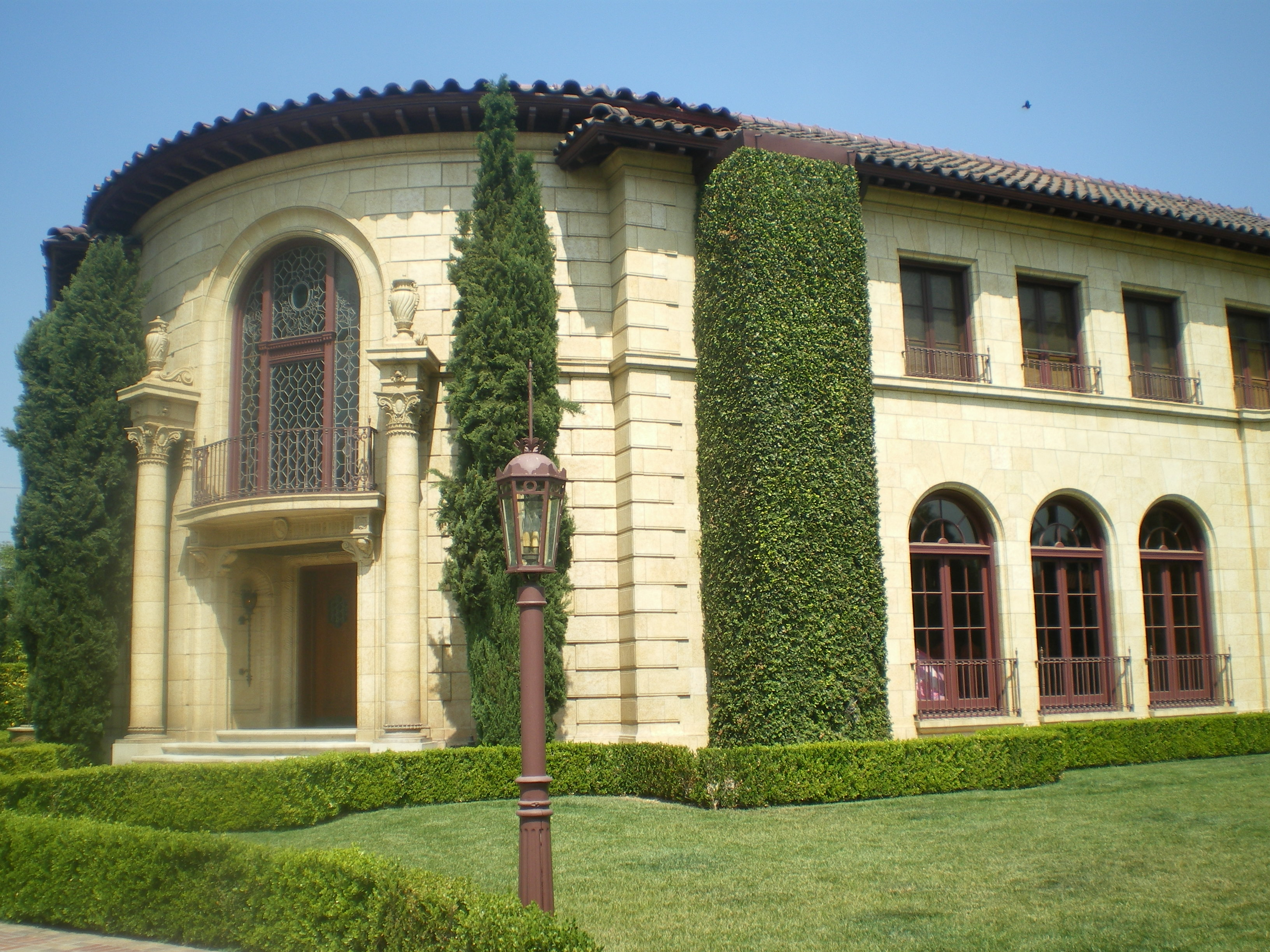
Petitfils-Boos House

=== Los Angeles ===
- Finney's Cafeteria interior re-design with Joseph Lawrence Feil Sr. (1913), LAHCM No. 137, contributing property in the Broadway Theater and Commercial District
- Challenge Cream and Butter Company Building (1920s)
- Petitfils-Boos House (1922), LAHCM No. 835, NRHP No. 05000049
- Andrew's Hardware (1924)
- Aldama Elementary School (1924)
- Maxime's Building (1924)

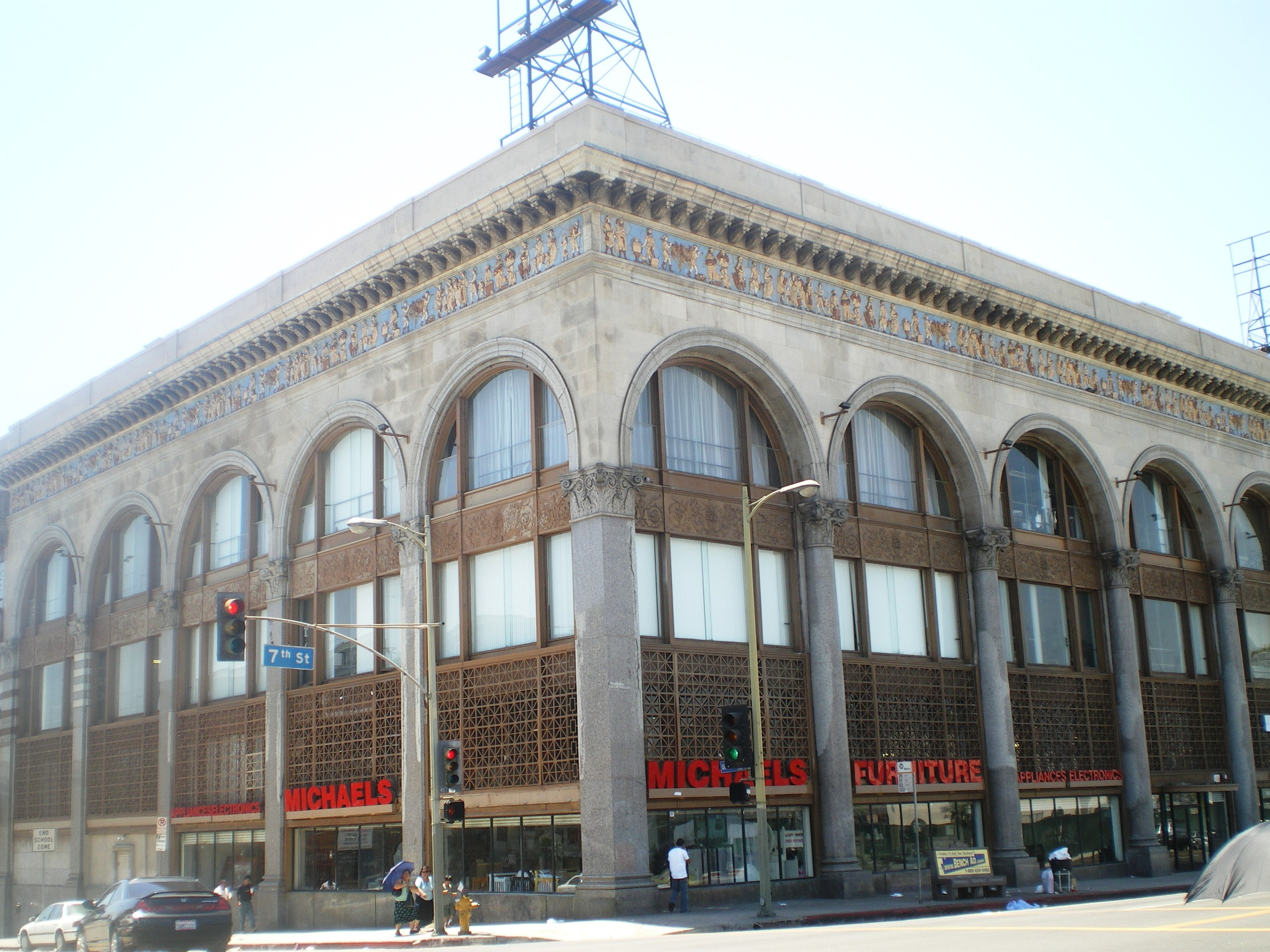
Young's Market Company Building

- Young's Market Company Building (1924), LAHCM No. 113, NRHP No. 04000595
- Schaber's Cafeteria Building (1928), contributing property in the Broadway Theater and Commercial District
- Hoffman Candy Company Building (1929), LAHCM No. 1275

==== With Wurdeman and Becket ====
- Murphy's Ranch (1933–1934)
- Clifton's Brookdale Cafeteria (1935)
- Pan-Pacific Auditorium (1935) LAHCM No. 183, NRHP No. 78000688
- Plymouth Apartments (1936), LAHCM No. 970

=== Elsewhere ===
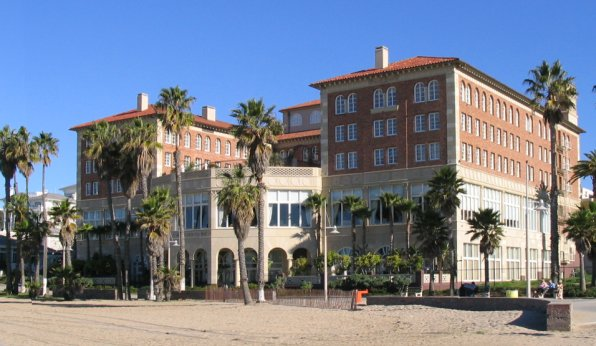
Hotel Casa del Mar

- Hotel Casa del Mar (1926), Santa Monica, California, NRHP No. 00001169

== See also ==
- List of American architects
- List of people from Los Angeles
