= K&W Cafeterias =

Defunct chain of American restaurants

K&W Cafeteria
- Formerly: Carolinian Coffee Shop
- Company type: Private
- Traded as: K&W Cafeteria Inc.
- Industry: Casual dining restaurant
- Founded: November 28, 1935; 90 years ago Winston-Salem, North Carolina, U.S.
- Founder: Grady T. Allred, Sr.
- Defunct: 2025
- Fate: Closed by parent company
- Headquarters: Winston-Salem, North Carolina, U.S.
- Area served: North Carolina, Virginia
- Key people: Gary Allred (Chairman and CEO); Dax Allred (President ) Todd Smith (Executive VP)
- Products: Homestyle food
- Owner: Piccadilly Restaurants
- Website: www.kwcafeterias.com

K&W Cafeterias Inc. was an American chain of cafeteria-style restaurants in the Southeastern United States. It was a subsidiary of Piccadilly Restaurants from 2022; until its acquisition by Piccadilly, its headquarters were located in Winston-Salem, North Carolina. On December 1, 2025, Piccadilly announced the closure of all K&W Cafeterias effective immediately. K&W served traditional Southern foods including fried chicken, turnip greens, fried okra, and homemade desserts.

== History ==
Grady T. Allred, Sr., a founder of K&W Cafeterias, entered the restaurant business on Thanksgiving Day 1935, as an employee of a small restaurant on Cherry Street in Winston-Salem, North Carolina. The Carolinian Coffee Shop was owned by brothers Thomas, Kenneth, and William Wilson, and their brother-in-law, T.K. Knight. In 1937, the initials K&W (for Knight and Wilson) were adopted, and K&W Restaurant was established.

Allred later acquired a one-third interest in the K&W Restaurant. After operating the restaurant with his partners for a few years, Allred purchased their interests and became the sole owner of K&W Restaurant in 1941.

The K&W Restaurant continued to operate at the Winston-Salem Cherry Street location until fire damage forced it to close for several months. After repairs and restoration were completed, it reopened as a restaurant-and-cafeteria combination. The cafeteria concept of the operation became so popular and successful that Allred decided to convert the unit entirely to a cafeteria-style food service.

K&W occupied its original location in Winston-Salem until an urban renewal project forced a move to 720 Coliseum Drive in Winston-Salem.

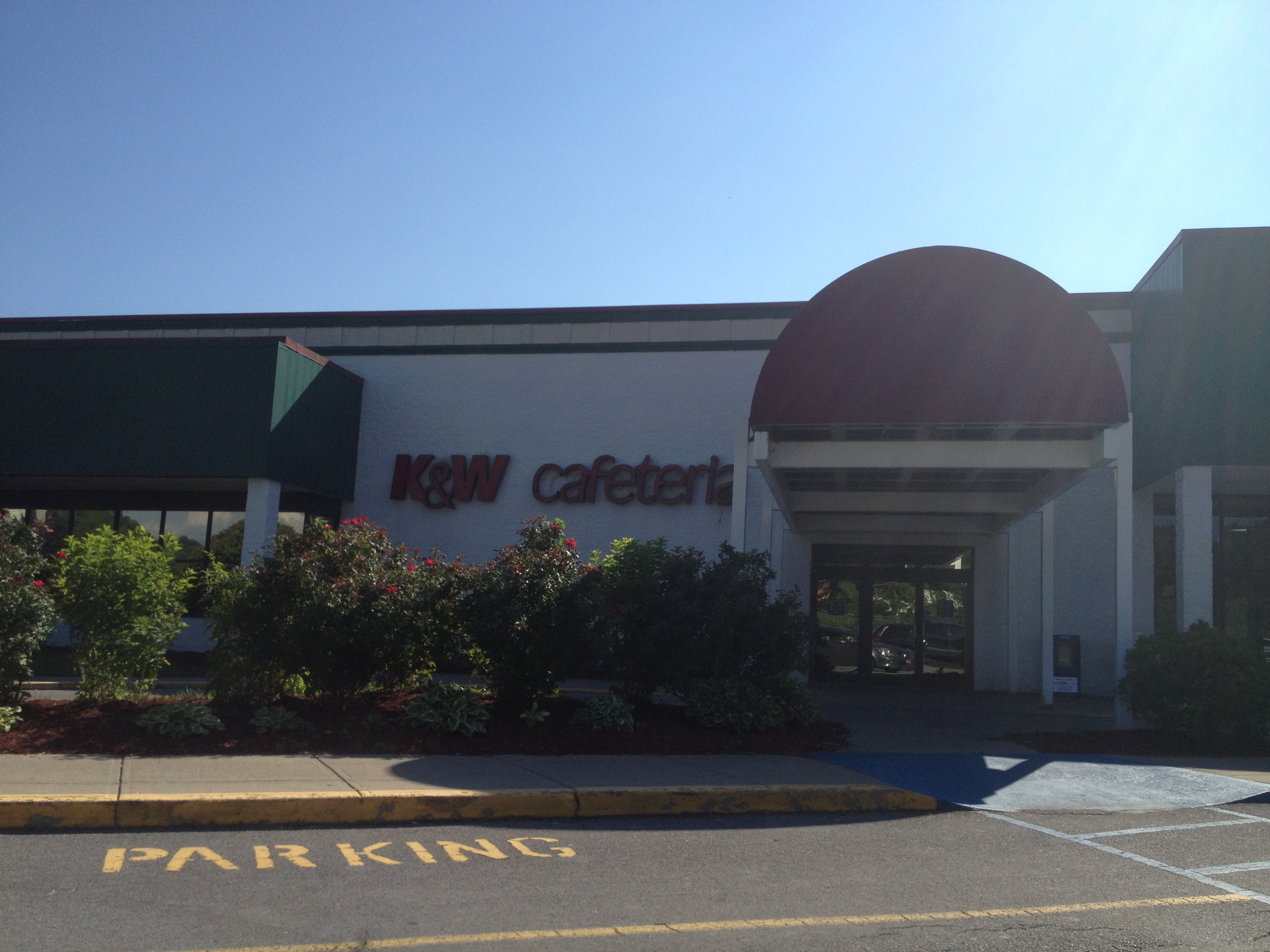
K&W Cafeteria, Mercer, West Virginia

Grady Allred, Sr., died in 1983. The chain continued to be operated by the third generation of his family.

On January 18, 1988, the K&W located at 380 Knollwood Street in Winston-Salem exploded due to a natural gas leak. The restaurant was destroyed, and the attached Sheraton hotel was severely damaged beyond repair, necessitating demolition. Four people sustained minor injuries due to the blast.

In 1991, K&W began offering take-out service through the To-Go Shop. In 2009, K&W began a catering service for events such as weddings and corporate meetings.

On September 6, 2020, K&W announced it had filed for Chapter 11 bankruptcy protection due to the COVID-19 pandemic's effect on restaurants. The company emerged from bankruptcy in September 2021, after reducing the number of locations from 18 to 14 and the number of employees from 1,035 to 834.

On August 16, 2022, president Dax Allred announced the acquisition of K&W and its eleven locations by Piccadilly Restaurants.

On December 1, 2025, K&W announced the immediate closure of all locations, which prior to closure were eight in North Carolina and one in Virginia. On December 4, 2025, K&W filed for Chapter 7 bankruptcy liquidation.
