= Sholl's Colonial Cafeteria =

Coordinates: 38°54′8″N 77°2′40″W

Sholl's Colonial Cafeteria, was a 20th-century Washington, D.C. cafeteria-style restaurant that was famous for its popularity among tourists and government workers. The restaurant served everyone from United States presidents to the homeless. It closed its doors on December 5, 2001, due to rent increases combined with a sudden drop in local tourism that year based on fear of terrorism.

== Location ==
At its height, the restaurant had become a chain with eight locations, but for its last decade the restaurant's only location was at 1990 K Street N.W., with its entrance on 20th Street N.W. Often, charter buses would be outside, picking up or letting off groups of high school students from around the country.

== History ==
The first location opened in 1928 by Evan A. Sholl. Sholl was an entrepreneur from rural Pennsylvania whose businesses included farms, a dairy, an ice cream factory, and real estate. Opening his chain of cafeterias helped the growing numbers of government workers in the late 1920s and 1930s who were short on time and lunch options.

George and Van Fleishell were the last owners and managers of Sholl's. George Fleishell was Evan Sholl's nephew through Evan's wife Gertrude and grew up working for Sholl's as a child. Returning from his service in World War II, George worked for Sholl's until the day it closed.

At its height, Sholl's served 10 people a minute, 2 million a year. At one point there were eight locations in Washington, D.C., Arlington, and Baltimore. The final location at 1990 K Street NW closed its doors on December 1, 2001. The number of tourists to the city had fallen off after the recent terrorist attacks, and there was a public campaign to implore the landlord of that location to forego his intended rent increase.

== Racial integration ==
From at least the 1940s and throughout the period of the fight for racial integration, Sholl's took a stand against racial segregation and served African Americans.

Sholl's employees included immigrants from Europe, Africa, South America, and Asia. One cook was Marina Naranjo. Sholl extended family members also worked there.

== Religion ==
At Sholl's, any member of the clergy, regardless of his or her religion, was served a free meal. Featured at every table were prayer cards that suggested grace— Catholic, Jewish, or Protestant—before meals. A colorful framed certificate from the Pope hung on the wall.

== Charity work ==
Sholl's took part in programs to feed the homeless. Michael Kirwin, a D.C. advocate for the homeless, wrote in The Washington Post of the generosity of Sholl's management. Years before, Kirwin had given $5,000 to feed homeless patrons. "Somehow that $5,000 check never seemed to run out," Kirwan recalled. "The stories I've heard from people on the streets, their quiet moments of dignity, respect, warmth and a full and nourishing meal at the hands of this wonderful cafeteria could fill a book of essays."
