= Piccadilly Restaurants =

American restaurant chain

- Trade name: Piccadilly Cafeteria
- Type: Private
- Industry: Restaurants
- Founded: 1944; 82 years ago in Baton Rouge, Louisiana
- Founder: Thomas J. Costas
- Headquarters: Baton Rouge, Louisiana, U.S.
- Number of locations: 27 (January 2025)
- Key people: Aslam Khan, President Abraham Khan, CDO Prashanta Purie, CTO Rachel Purie Zimba, CMO Keith Brown, COO
- Products: Comfort food, cafeterias, institutional food service management, catering
- Owner: Piccadilly Holdings LLC.
- Website: www.piccadilly.com

Piccadilly Restaurants is an American chain of cafeteria-style, casual dining restaurants in seven, mainly southeastern United States, with the majority located in the Gulf Coast region. Piccadilly Holdings LLC owns them.

In addition to its traditional restaurants, Piccadilly operates Piccadilly Emergency Services, which provides meals in emergency and disaster settings, and Piccadilly Food Service, which offers meals for schools, hospitals, and government organizations.

The company also offers family dining, meals-to-go and catering services.

== History ==
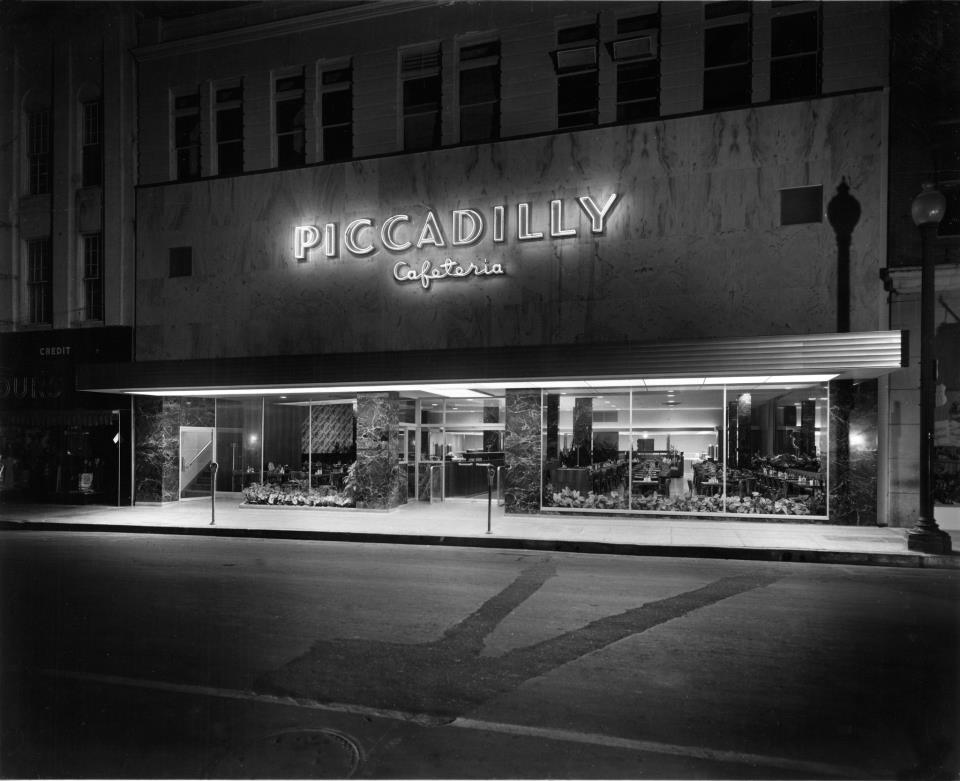
Piccadilly first opened its doors in Baton Rouge, Louisiana in 1932.

Thomas J. Costas opened the first Piccadilly Cafeteria in 1932 in Baton Rouge, Louisiana. Tandy Hannibal Hamilton acquired the business from Costas in 1944.

Piccadilly expanded in 1998 when it purchased Morrison's Cafeteria, a major competitor. The move doubled the number of locations to 270; poor performance led the company to file for bankruptcy in 2003. Yucaipa Companies and Diversified Investment Management Group then purchased the company.

Piccadilly filed again for Chapter 11 bankruptcy protection in 2012, as it was down to 41 locations. The company was purchased by Falcon Holdings, owned by Aslam Khan, in 2014. In 2018, the company resumed its expansion, opening its first Piccadilly To-Go location in Cordova, Tennessee. In 2019 a "prototype" restaurant designed to lead future growth was opened at Juban Crossing in Denham Springs, LA, near the company's original location in Baton Rouge.

As of October 2025, the company operates 28 locations in Florida, Georgia, Louisiana, Mississippi, Tennessee, and Virginia. One store in Mobile, Alabama retains the Morrison's Cafeteria name, an homage to that chain's former hometown, but otherwise has the same menu selections as the rest of the Piccadilly chain.

On August 16, 2022, K&W Cafeterias president Dax Allred announced the sale of K&W and its 11 locations to Piccadilly.
