= Forum Cafeterias =

Former American restaurant chain

The Forum Cafeteria was a chain of economical cafeteria-style restaurants which operated across the United States. The company was founded in 1918 and had restaurants in the downtown areas of several major cities. In the 1960s the company expanded its business concept to suburban areas, opening shopping center locations at Antioch Shopping Center, Kansas City, Missouri and the Dadeland Shopping Center southwest of Miami.

The company was founded by Clarence Hayman (1881–1971) who owned several restaurant venues before establishing the concept of a ground floor cafeteria, in 1921, at 1220 Grand Avenue in Kansas City, Missouri. He later opened similar branches in other cities of the Midwestern United States. Clem Templin (1884–1966) was a vice president of the firm. The building architect for the cafeterias was George B. Franklin (1883–1953)

== See also ==
- List of defunct fast-food restaurant chains
