= Harzfeld's =

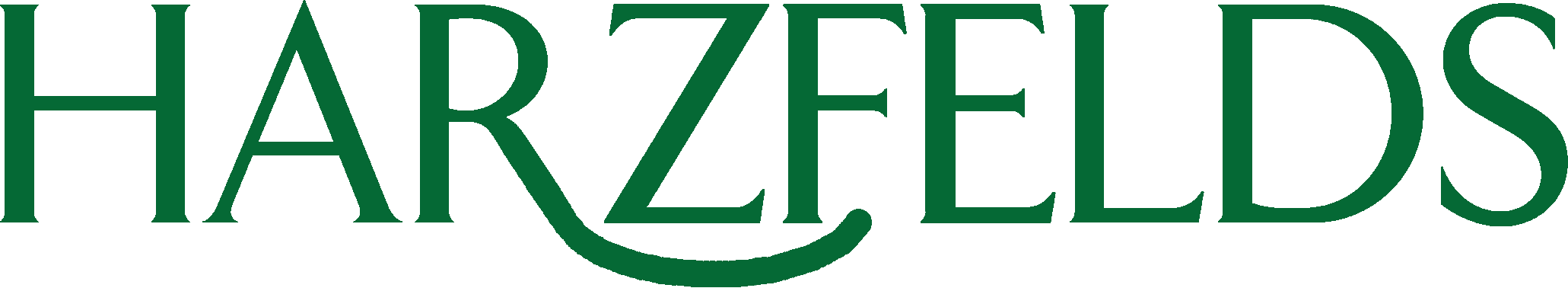
- Industry: Retail
- Founded: 1891
- Defunct: 1984
- Fate: Liquidation
- Headquarters: Kansas City, Missouri
- Products: Fashion apparel, shoes, accessories, and cosmetics.
- Parent: Allied Stores

Harzfeld's was a Kansas City, Missouri-based department store chain specializing in women's and children's high-end apparel.

== History ==
The company was founded in 1891, as "Parisian Cloak Company" by Siegmund Harzfeld and partner Ferdinand Siegel. Harzfeld served as president until succeeded by Ferdinand Siegel's son, Lester Siegel, Sr. In February 1966, Lester Siegel, Jr. began serving as the company's third president

In 1959, Harzfeld's went public, with its common shares traded on the local over-the-counter stock exchange. In 1972, the chain was acquired for $3 million by the retail conglomerate Garfinckel, Brooks Brothers, Miller & Rhoads, Inc. With the 1981, acquisition of its parent conglomerate, it became a part of Allied Stores. In 1984, the chain was closed.

== Flagship store ==
The original location of the Parisian Cloak Company was at 1108 and 1110 Main Street, Kansas City, Missouri. In 1913, the store moved to Main Street and Petticoat Lane and its name was changed to Harzfeld's. The new flagship was designed by noted architect John McKecknie as an office building. The store eventually expanded into an adjoining building, thereby extending its reach from Main to Walnut Streets. After closing in 1984, the flagship was integrated into the Town Pavilion complex.

The store was renowned for a 1947 mural commissioned by the store and painted by Thomas Hart Benton. After the store closure, the mural, known as "Achelous and Hercules", was acquired by the Smithsonian Institution's American Art Museum in Washington, D.C.

== Branch stores ==
In 1929, Harzfeld's opened its first branch location in Columbia, Missouri. The store catered to the local college student population of the University of Missouri, Stephens College, and Columbia College. On April 10, 1954, Harzfeld's opened its first branch in Kansas City at Country Club Plaza. In 1958, a second branch was opened in the Blue Ridge Mall shopping center. Further expansion occurred in 1963 with the opening of the Corinth Square store. A fifth store in greater Kansas City was opened in the Metcalf South Shopping Center in 1967. Shortly after its parent conglomerate acquired two Gus Meyer locations in Oklahoma in 1974, it converted them to Harzfeld's.

The 10,000 sq ft (929 m^{2}) Corinth Square store closed August 8, 1984 and became a Wooten Drugs; Metcalf South also closed the same day. The Tulsa store was converted to a Brooks Brothers. The Downtown Kansas City store was closed and became part of a redevelopment projects. The Country Club Plaza location was converted to a Bonwit Teller later that year.

Timeline of Harzfeld's Stores
Store	City	Address or mall	Opened	Closed	Notes
Downtown; Kansas City; Flagship	Downtown Kansas City	1111 Main St.	1913	1984	Integrated into Town Pavilion
Lawrence KS	Lawrence KS		1923		
Columbia MO	Columbia MO		1929 / 1949		
Country Club Plaza	Kansas City	Country Club Plaza	Apr 10, 1954	Jan 1984	87,000 sq ft (8,083 m^{2}), 65 employees at closing. Became a Bonwit Teller employing 100.
Blue Ridge	Kansas City MO	Blue Ridge Mall	1958	Jan 1984	41,000 sq ft (3,809 m^{2}). Taken over by Jones Store Co.
Corinth Square	Prairie Village KS	Corinth Square	1963	Aug 8, 1984	became a Wooten Drugs
Metcalf South	Overland Park KS	Metcalf South Shopping Center	1967	Aug 8, 1984	Taken over by Jones Store Co. upon closing.
Tulsa	Tulsa OK	Utica Square	Nov 11, 1974		Previously a Gus Mayer. Became a Brooks Brothers.
Oklahoma City	Oklahoma City	Penn Square Mall	Nov 10, 1974		12,096 sq ft (1,124 m^{2}). Previously a Gus Mayer
