= Sporting Park =

Soccer stadium in Kansas City, Kansas

- The Blue Hell; Home of the Brave

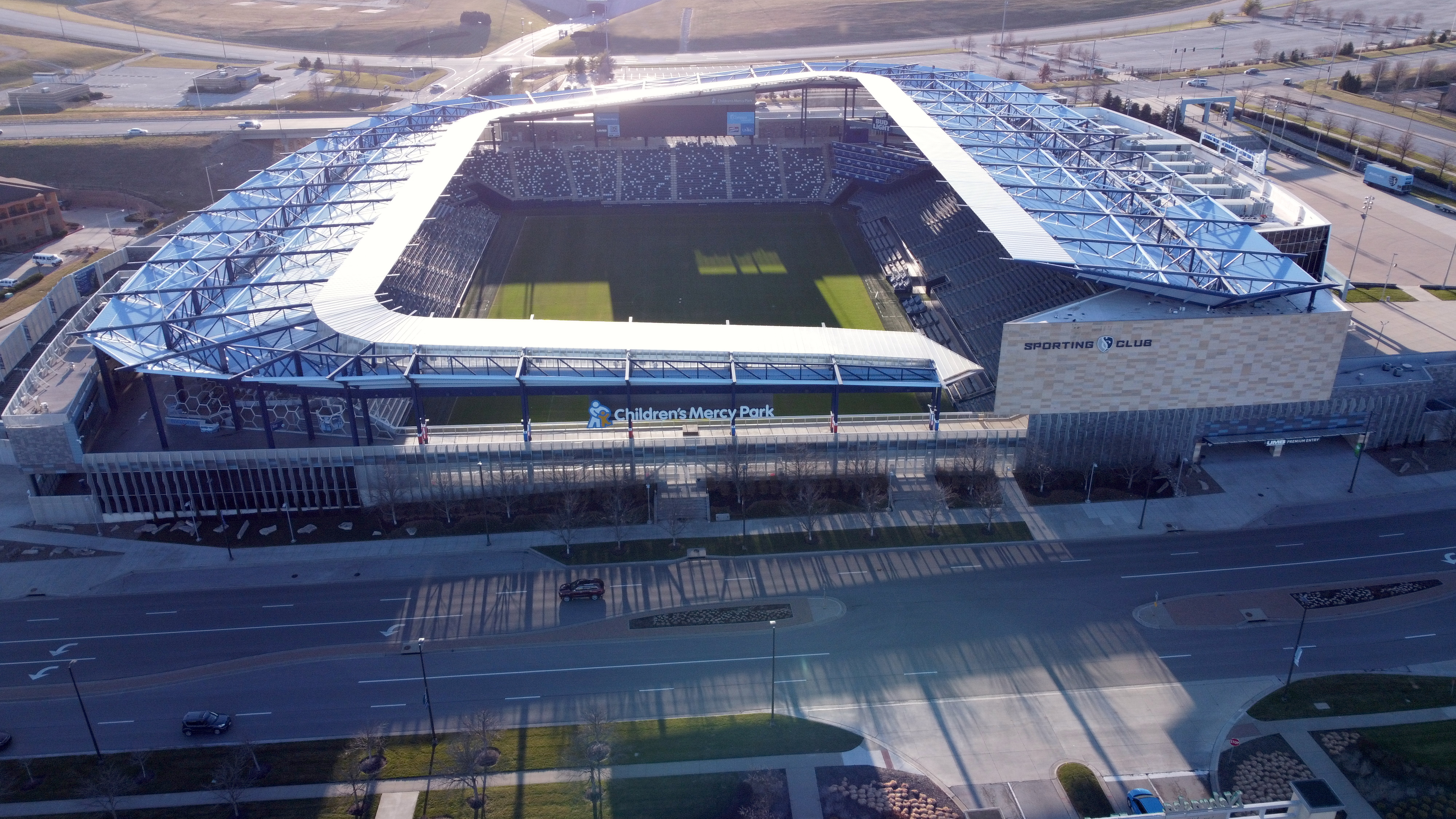
- Sporting Park from the air (pictured in 2021 when it was known as Children's Mercy Park)

- Location in Kansas Location in the United States
- Former names: Livestrong Sporting Park (2011–2013); Children's Mercy Park (2015–2025)
- Address: One Sporting Way
- Location: Kansas City, Kansas, U.S.
- Coordinates: 39.12174°N 94.82318°W
- Owner: Kansas Unified Development, LLC.
- Operator: Sporting Kansas City
- Capacity: 18,467 (soccer); 25,000 (concerts)
- Surface: Natural Grass
- Scoreboard: Three Daktronics Video Boards; 20 by 126 feet (6.1 m × 38.4 m); 12 by 24 feet (3.7 m × 7.3 m); 14.5 by 24 feet (4.4 m × 7.3 m)
- Record attendance: 21,650 Sporting Kansas City vs. Real Salt Lake, MLS Cup 2013
- Field size: 120 yd × 75 yd (110 m × 69 m)
- Public transit: KCATA 101

Construction
- Groundbreaking: January 20, 2010
- Opened: June 9, 2011
- Cost: $200 million ($286 million in 2025 dollars)
- Architect: Populous
- Project manager: LANE4 Property Group
- Services engineers: M-E Engineers, Inc./FSC Inc.
- General contractor: Turner Construction

Tenants
- Sporting Kansas City (MLS) (2011–present); Sporting Kansas City II (MLSNP) (2018–present); FC Kansas City (NWSL) (2015–2017); Kansas City Current (NWSL) (2022–2023)

Sporting Park (Note: The stadium has been known as Livestrong Sporting Park (2011–2013), Sporting Park (2013–2015) and Children's Mercy Park (2015–2025)) is a soccer-specific stadium in Kansas City, Kansas, United States, and is the team home for Sporting Kansas City of Major League Soccer (MLS). The stadium is located near Kansas Speedway, on the far west side of Wyandotte County, Kansas. It opened during the 2011 MLS season on June 9, 2011, with a match against the Chicago Fire. The stadium has a seating capacity of 18,467, which can expand to 25,000 for concerts. Most SKC games attract around 21,000 spectators because of different stadium modes. The stadium is Sporting Kansas City's third home venue; then known as the Kansas City Wizards, the team played in Arrowhead Stadium from 1996 to 2007 and CommunityAmerica Ballpark from 2008 to 2010. In 2013, the stadium hosted the MLS All-Star Game, the United States men's national soccer team, and MLS Cup, and is the only stadium to host all three in the same year.

Since the 2026 MLS season, the stadium is once again named Sporting Park after Children's Mercy Hospital's naming rights agreement expired in February 2026.

== History ==
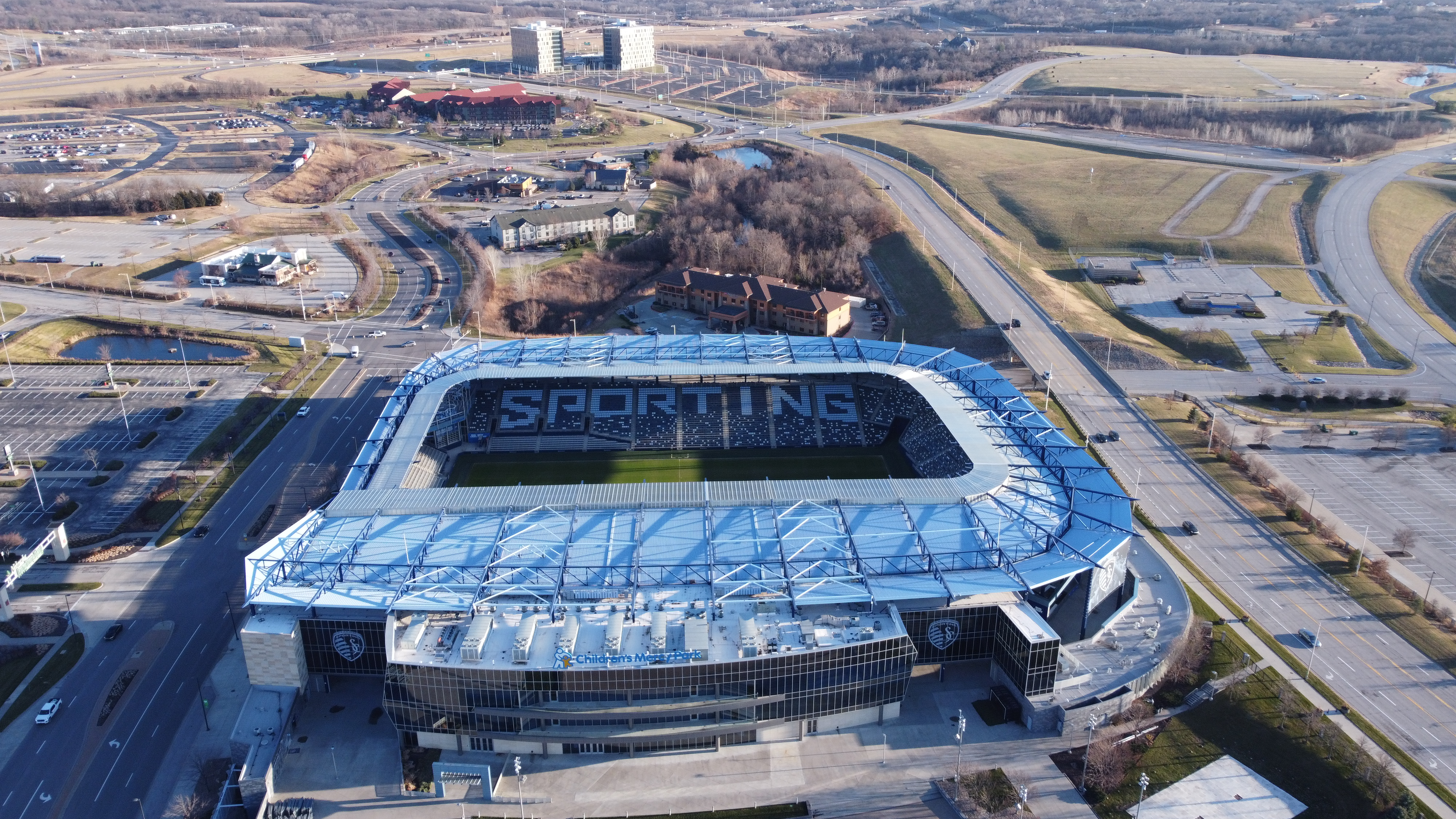
Sporting Park from the side

=== Initial planning ===
Originally, Sporting Club, the team's ownership group, planned to move to southeast Kansas City, Missouri on land previously occupied by Bannister Mall. The redevelopment plan, called The Trails, was passed on December 13, 2007. The last package of economic incentives, a $30 million tax rebate, was passed on November 21, 2008.

The stadium's planned site had been demolished to prepare the site for infrastructure. It was intended to open in 2011 with a capacity of 18,500 seats. However, the project was placed on hiatus due to the Great Recession, and the stadium developer eventually sought to move the new project near the Village West retail center in Kansas City, Kansas, near the Kansas Speedway and CommunityAmerica Ballpark. The developer of The Trails complex sought additional borrowing authority from Kansas City, Missouri, to finance the building of the soccer stadium and its associated amateur soccer complex. However, the city was unwilling to provide the desired financing, leading the developer to seek a new site across the state line.

=== Construction ===
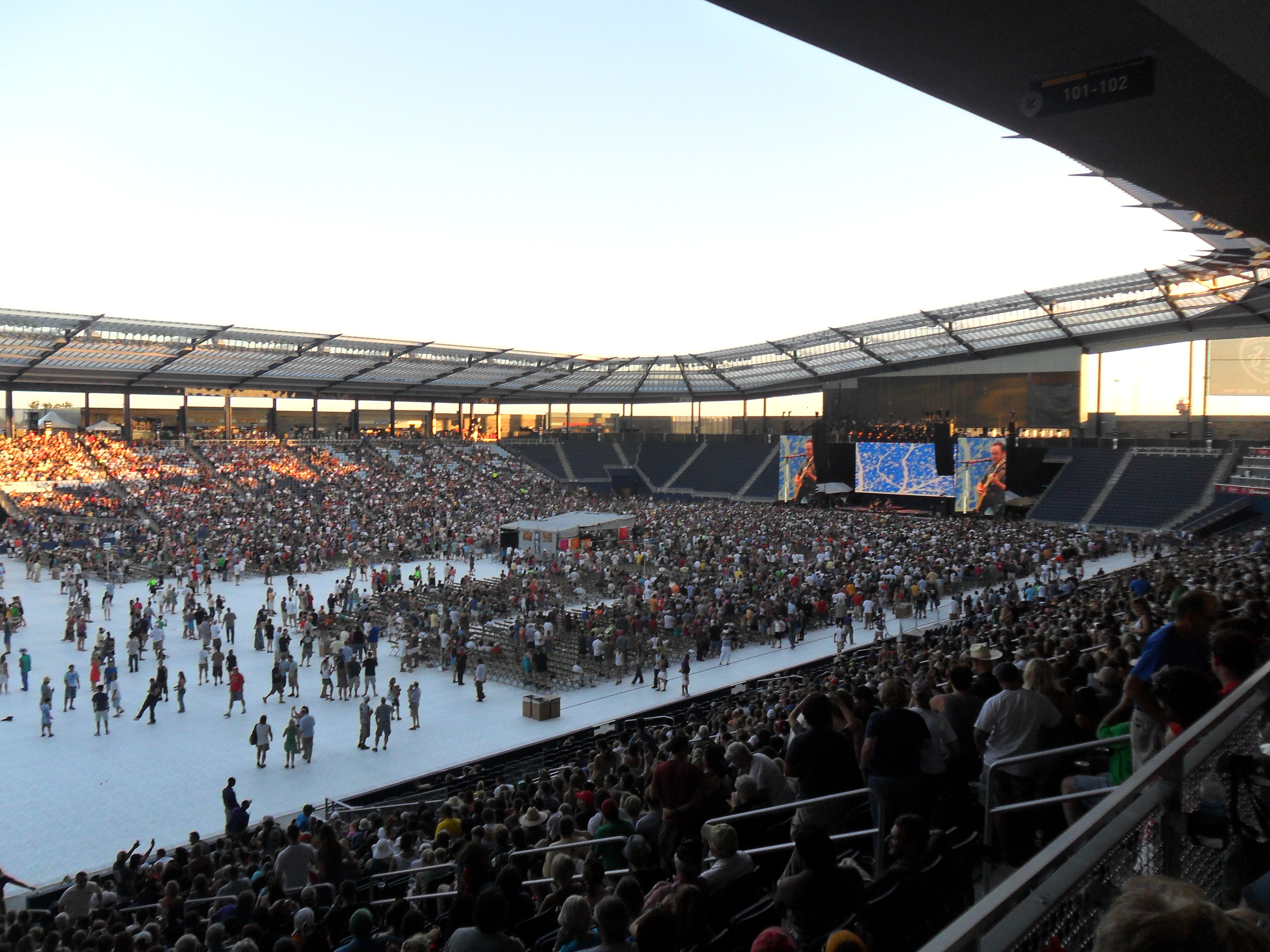
Dave Matthews and Tim Reynolds performing at the 2011 edition of Farm Aid at the stadium in its inaugural year.

In September 2009, the developer asked Wyandotte County and Kansas state officials for permission to use revenues from existing tax increment financing in the Village West area to help finance the soccer complex. On December 17, Sporting KC president, Robb Heineman provided an update on the stadium situation published on team official website and blog, basically putting the Kansas City, Kansas location as final, pending the signature of the final agreements. On December 21, construction machinery was already on the Legends site waiting to break ground on the site. On January 19, Wyandotte County approved the bonds to help finance the stadium, and on January 20, the groundbreaking ceremony happened with Sporting's CEO, Robb Heineman, using heavy machinery to move dirt on the construction site.

=== Inaugural season ===
The opening match took place on June 9, 2011, as Sporting played the Chicago Fire to a scoreless draw in front of an over-capacity crowd of 19,925. The first goal would come days later during the 2011 CONCACAF Gold Cup when Dwayne De Rosario converted a penalty kick for Canada against Panama. Sporting's first goal came from C. J. Sapong in a 1–0 win over the San Jose Earthquakes, the club's first victory in the stadium. Sporting would finish its first regular season in the stadium with a 9–2–6 record at home. Average attendance was 17,810 for the year or 96.4% of capacity.

=== 2012–present ===
In the stadium's second season, Sporting KC averaged an attendance of 19,404, 105% of its capacity. That year, Sporting KC made it to the playoffs but lost to the Houston Dynamo in the conference semifinals, and won the US Open Cup by defeating the Seattle Sounders.

In 2013, Sporting KC once again raised their average attendance. Because of their 2012 US Open Cup win, they qualified for the CONCACAF Champions League, and played games both in the MLS and in CONCACAF. Sporting Park also hosted to a World Cup qualifying match between the United States and Jamaica with an attendance of 18,467, where the United States shut out Jamaica 2–0, and the 2013 MLS All-Star Game between A.S. Roma and the MLS All-Stars with an attendance of 21,175, where A.S. Roma beat the All-Stars 3–1. Sporting KC set an attendance record of 21,650 in the playoffs when they defeated the Houston Dynamo 2–1 to advance to the MLS Cup Finals against Real Salt Lake. Sporting won in penalty kicks, the second final in two years to be hosted at Sporting Park.

Also in 2013, it was announced that the 2014 through 2018 NCAA Division II Football Championships would be played at Sporting Park, moving from Braly Municipal Stadium in Florence, Alabama. It was also announced that the 2015 NCAA College Cup would be played at Sporting Park.

In 2015, the stadium hosted FC Kansas City's home opener against fellow NWSL side Sky Blue FC. The stadium also hosted two FC Kansas City matches in 2016, once again serving as the team's secondary stadium.

The stadium announced in 2016 that they are adding a Skycam, as well as robo-cams behind the goals and on top of the stadium.

During a CONCACAF Champions League match against Deportivo Toluca F.C. on February 21, 2019, a metal railing overlooking the southwest tunnel broke and caused several fans to fall. Toluca winger Felipe Pardo was injured with a toe fracture because of the railing.

==== Kansas City Current, 2022–2023 ====
FC Kansas City folded after the 2017 NWSL season and its franchise rights were relocated to Salt Lake City, Utah, becoming expansion club Utah Royals FC. After the 2020 NWSL season, the Royals folded and its franchise rights were relocated back to Kansas City, under different ownership as an expansion team and with a temporary moniker of Kansas City NWSL. The team attempted to rent Sporting Park as a home venue for the 2021 NWSL season, but Sporting KC declined to rent the venue to the team, which played only one home match of its inaugural season's home matches at the venue. The team played the rest of the season's home matches at Legends Field, a baseball stadium home to minor-league team Kansas City Monarchs and a former venue for the Wizards from 2008 to 2010.

During the 2021 season, KC NWSL announced plans to build its own stadium on the Berkley Riverfront Park of Kansas City, Missouri, with the new venue expected to open before the 2024 season. After announcing the new stadium, the team announced on September 22, 2021, that it would also play all of its home matches at Sporting Park from the 2022 season to the new stadium's opening. The team rebranded to the Kansas City Current on October 31, 2021, during their final match at Legends Field.

=== Kansas Jayhawks football ===
Due to renovations at David Booth Kansas Memorial Stadium, the University of Kansas football team played two home games at Sporting Park in 2024. Both games were against non-conference opponents; the home Big XII conference games were played at Arrowhead Stadium.

== International matches ==
Sporting Park hosted its first international match with the final Group C matches of the 2011 CONCACAF Gold Cup. Canada and Panama played to a 1–1 draw in this match, which was followed by the stadium's first-ever USA match, a 1–0 win over Guadeloupe.

The stadium played host to its first-ever women's match when it hosted the United States women's team in its first match since the 2011 FIFA Women's World Cup, a 1–1 draw with Canada witnessed by a crowd of 16,191.

Sporting Park played host to the semifinals and final of the 2012 CONCACAF Men's Olympic Qualifying Tournament.

=== Men's matches ===
Date	Team 1	Result	Team 2	Tournament	Spectators
June 14, 2011	Canada	1–1	Panama	2011 CONCACAF Gold Cup	20,109
June 14, 2011	United States	1–0	Guadeloupe	2011 CONCACAF Gold Cup	20,109
March 31, 2012	El Salvador U-23	2–3 (AET)	Honduras U-23	2012 CONCACAF Men's Olympic Qualifying Tournament	16,101
March 31, 2012	Mexico U-23	3–1	Canada U-23	2012 CONCACAF Men's Olympic Qualifying Tournament	16,101
April 2, 2012	Honduras U-23	1–2	Mexico U-23	2012 CONCACAF Men's Olympic Qualifying Tournament	10,501
October 16, 2012	United States	3–1	Guatemala	2014 FIFA World Cup qualification	16,947
October 11, 2013	United States	2–0	Jamaica	2014 FIFA World Cup qualification	18,467
July 13, 2015	Haiti	1–0	Honduras	2015 CONCACAF Gold Cup	18,467
July 13, 2015	United States	1–1	Panama	2015 CONCACAF Gold Cup	18,467
October 1, 2015	Panama U-23	1–1	Cuba U-23	2015 CONCACAF Men's Olympic Qualifying Championship	3,827
October 1, 2015	United States U-23	3–1	Canada U-23	2015 CONCACAF Men's Olympic Qualifying Championship	3,827
October 3, 2015	Canada U-23	3–1	Panama U-23	2015 CONCACAF Men's Olympic Qualifying Championship	3,755
October 3, 2015	Cuba U-23	1–6	United States U-23	2015 CONCACAF Men's Olympic Qualifying Championship	3,755
May 28, 2016	United States	4–0	Bolivia	Friendly	8,894
June 26, 2019	Trinidad and Tobago	1–1	Guyana	2019 CONCACAF Gold Cup	17,037
June 26, 2019	United States	1–0	Panama	2019 CONCACAF Gold Cup	17,037
July 11, 2021	Canada	4–1	Martinique	2021 CONCACAF Gold Cup	12,664
July 11, 2021	United States	1–0	Haiti	2021 CONCACAF Gold Cup	12,664
July 15, 2021	Haiti	1–4	Canada	2021 CONCACAF Gold Cup	7,511
July 15, 2021	Martinique	1–6	United States	2021 CONCACAF Gold Cup	7,511
July 18, 2021	United States	1–0	Canada	2021 CONCACAF Gold Cup	18,467
June 5, 2022	United States	0–0	Uruguay	Friendly	19,569
June 25, 2024	Peru	0–1	Canada	2024 Copa América Group A	15,625
September 7, 2024	United States	1–2	Canada	Friendly	10,523
June 10, 2026	Algeria	–	Bolivia	Friendly	

=== Women's matches ===
Date	Team 1	Result	Team 2	Event	Spectators
September 17, 2011	United States	1–1	Canada	Friendly	16,191
October 15, 2014	Guatemala	0–1	Haiti	2014 CONCACAF Women's Championship (Note: The 2014 CONCACAF Women's Championship served as CONCACAF's 2015 FIFA Women's World Cup qualification)	3,621
October 15, 2014	United States	1–0	Trinidad and Tobago	2014 CONCACAF Women's Championship	3,621
October 16, 2014	Costa Rica	1–0	Mexico	2014 CONCACAF Women's Championship	N/A
October 16, 2014	Jamaica	6–0	Martinique	2014 CONCACAF Women's Championship	N/A
July 22, 2016	United States	4–0	Costa Rica	2016 Olympics warm-up	12,635
July 26, 2018	Brazil	1–3	Australia	2018 Tournament of Nations	10,307
July 26, 2018	United States	4–2	Japan	2018 Tournament of Nations	18,467
October 21, 2021	United States	0–0	South Korea	Friendly	18,467
September 3, 2022	United States	4–0	Nigeria	Friendly	14,502

== Stadium naming rights ==
On March 8, 2011, a partnership with Lance Armstrong's Livestrong Foundation was announced. The club was to donate a portion of revenues, no less than $7.5 million, to the foundation over the course of six years. On January 15, 2013, Livestrong and Sporting Kansas City agreed to terminate the naming agreement.

On November 19, 2015, a ten-year partnership with Children's Mercy Hospital was announced, renaming the stadium to Children's Mercy Park.

== Attendance records ==
The 2013 MLS All-Star Game on July 31, 2013, between the MLS All-Stars and A.S. Roma set a record attendance of 21,175 including standing room only tickets. One week later, Sporting set a new attendance record in a loss against New York Red Bulls on August 3 with 21,304 people. On November 23, 2013, Sporting set the record once again, reaching a fire-code capacity crowd of 21,650 in the Eastern Conference Final win against the Houston Dynamo. Two weeks later, on December 7, the team tied the record in a penalty kick win against Real Salt Lake in the MLS Cup 2013. On June 6, 2015, Sporting set a record for regular season attendance at 21,505 in a 1–0 win over Seattle Sounders FC.

== Recognition and awards ==
- Winner of the 2012 "Venue of the Year Award" and "Community Award" – TheStadiumBusiness Awards 2012.
- One of 4 finalists for "Sports Facility of the Year" – 2012 Sports Business Awards from Street & Smith's SportsBusiness Journal and SportsBusiness Daily.
- One of 8 finalists for "New Venue Award" – TheStadiumBusiness Awards 2012.

== Notes ==
Preceded by CommunityAmerica Ballpark	Home of the Sporting Kansas City; 2011—present	Succeeded by current
Preceded by CenturyLink Field	Host of the Lamar Hunt U.S. Open Cup Final; 2012	Succeeded by Rio Tinto Stadium
Preceded by PPL Park	Host of the MLS All-Star Game; 2013	Succeeded by Providence Park
Preceded by Home Depot Center	Host of the MLS Cup; 2013	Succeeded by StubHub Center
Preceded by Legends Field	Home of the Kansas City Current; 2021–2023	Succeeded by CPKC Stadium
Preceded by Braly Municipal Stadium	Host of the NCAA Division II Football Championship; 2014–2017	Succeeded by McKinney ISD District Stadium
Preceded by WakeMed Soccer Park	Host of the College Cup; 2015	Succeeded by BBVA Compass Stadium
