= Sherman Dreiseszun =

American banker

- Born: Sherman W. Dreiseszun; May 24, 1922; Kansas City, Missouri
- Died: December 3, 2007 (age 85)
- Occupation: Real estate developer
- Children: 3

Sherman W. Dreiseszun (May 23, 1922 – December 3, 2007) was a banker and real estate developer who built Kansas City's two tallest buildings as well as several shopping malls throughout the Midwest.

== Early life ==
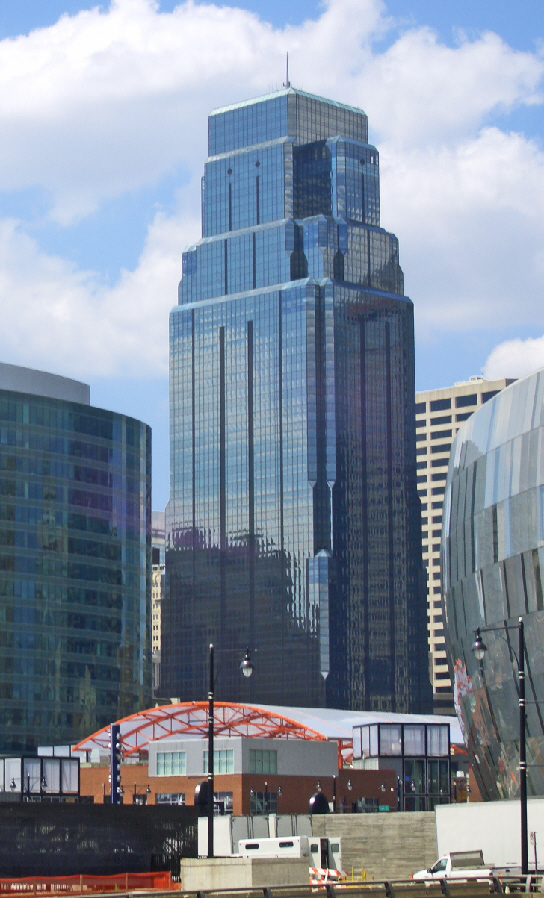
One Kansas City Place

Dreiseszun was the son of Polish Jewish immigrants. He was born at 1734 Prospect Avenue in the 18th and Vine Jazz District of Kansas City, Missouri. He served in World War II as a crewmember on B-17 planes. In 1946, he and nephew Frank Morgan (four years his junior) formed a partnership Vic-Gene Manufacturing Inc. to sell women's wear to Kansas City, Missouri-area stores.

== Shopping malls and banking empire ==
In the 1960s, it branched into building shopping malls opening the French Market in Overland Park, Kansas. In 1964, they took over a struggling effort to build the East Hills Mall in St. Joseph, Missouri They operated under the name of MD Management. In 1967, they opened Metcalf South Shopping Center which was the first large indoor mall in the Kansas City area. They would also establish a banking network Mission Bank in Mission, Kansas, Metro North State Bank in Kansas City, Missouri, Valley View State Bank in Overland Park Industrial State Bank in Kansas City, Kansas and Security Bank of Kansas City as well as Merchants Bank in Kansas City. The banks would finance their expansion. Some of the projects would be done in conjunction with Copaken, White & Blitt.

== Rebuilding the Kansas City skyline ==
In addition to building suburban shopping centers, they made their mark with the construction of Kansas City's two tallest buildings—the Town Pavilion in 1986 and One Kansas City Place in 1987. The buildings changed the landscape of downtown Kansas City where the Kansas City Power and Light Building had stood as the tallest since 1931. One Kansas City Place is twenty one feet taller than the Gateway Arch.

In 1985 and 1991, he and Morgan were listed on the Forbes list of richest Americans with more than $500 million in assets.

== Collapse ==
Their empire took big hits in the early 1990s when their banks faltered in the Savings and loan crisis. They were charged with bid rigging for leasing its office space. Morgan died in 1993 proclaiming his innocence. The FDIC prohibited Dreiseszun from being involved with the banks.

In 1996, he pleaded guilty to misdemeanor charges and paid a $375,000 fine and would regain control of many of his banks via the Valley View Financial Group.

== Personal life ==
In 1956, he married Irene Friedman; they had three children, Helene Dreiseszun Abrahams, Richard Dreiseszun, and Barbara Dreiseszun. He was president for life at Kehilath Israel Synagogue in Overland Park and was active with Jewish philanthropies.

== Shopping malls ==
- Buckingham Square Mall (now The Gardens on Havana), Aurora, Colorado
- Crestview Hills Mall, Crestview Hills, Kentucky
- East Hills Mall in Saint Joseph, Missouri (1965)
- French Market, Overland Park, Kansas
- Metcalf South Shopping Center, Overland Park, Kansas (1967-2014)
- Metro North Mall, Kansas City, Missouri (1976-2014)
- Oak Park Mall, Overland Park, Kansas (1975)
- Southwyck Shopping Center, Toledo, Ohio (1972-2008) Demolished in 2009
- West Main Mall, Kalamazoo, Michigan
- Westminster Mall, Denver, Colorado (1977-2011)
