= Metcalf South Shopping Center =

Shopping mall in Overland Park, Kansas

Coordinates: 38°57′15″N 94°39′55″W

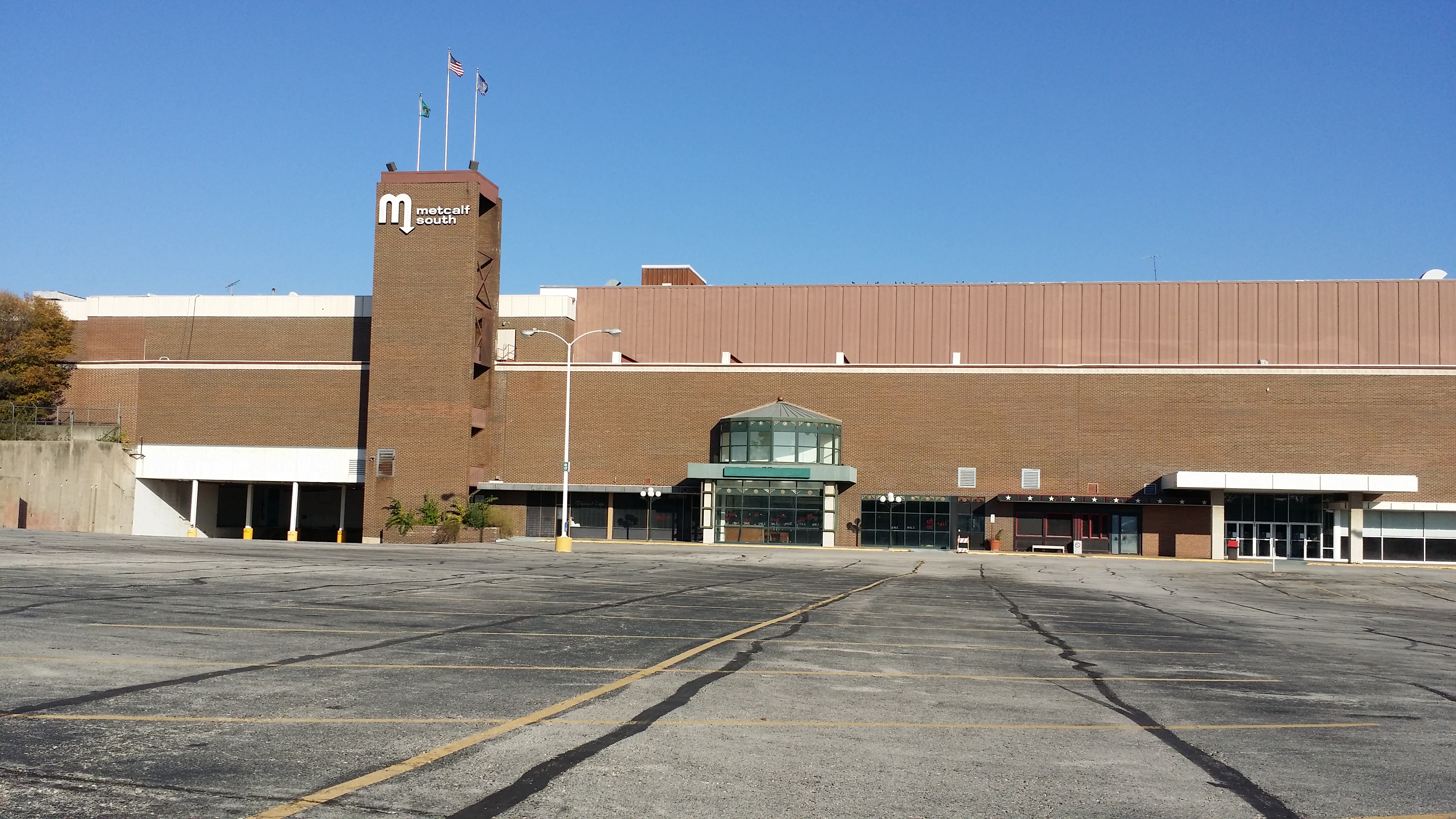
- Exterior view of Metcalf South Shopping Center, October 2014
- Location: Overland Park, Kansas, United States
- Address: 95th Street and Metcalf Avenue
- Opened: 1967
- Closed: September 19, 2014
- Developer: Copaken, White & Blitt
- Num. of stores: 58-62
- Num. of anchor tenants: 3
- Floors: 3

Metcalf South Shopping Center was a shopping mall in Overland Park, Kansas. It opened in 1967, near a large, unique department store called the French Market, which later became a strip mall anchored by Kmart and Hancock Fabrics (the Kmart closed in late 2013 and Hancock announced a move in early 2014). The Metcalf South mall itself originally featured two main floors of retail space, although later a third floor of retail space was added, which in recent years became home to office space. It featured two anchor stores (Sears and the Jones Store Company), later taken over by Macy's. Sears and the Glenwood Arts movie theater remained open in later years, while Macy's announced the closure of its Metcalf South store in January 2014.

After more than a decade of decline that left Metcalf South a dead mall, the property was purchased in February 2014 by Lane4 Property Group and The Kroenke Group. The owner of Lane4 stated it is likely the mall will be razed. On September 19, 2014, Metcalf South Mall closed. The movie theater closed on January 25, 2015.

In 2015, Sears Holdings spun off 235 of its properties, including the Sears at Metcalf South Shopping Center, into Seritage Growth Properties.

== Development ==
Metcalf South was developed by local entrepreneur Sherman Dreiseszun and his company MD Management, who envisioned it as a sort of utopian city, one with a "full-range of stores, restaurants, playgrounds, and parks," where "people shop, work, relax, meet, and have fun…attend meetings, inspect scientific or cultural exhibits, and maybe even dance" — all this with perfect weather year-round.

The shopping center, a two-level structure encompassing approximately 601,800 leasable square feet and 60 stores, was built by Martin-Salsbury Constructors, Inc. of Topeka. The building and parking lots sat on a 50-acre parcel 7.3 miles southwest of downtown Kansas City, Kansas, and a short distance north of an interchange with a newly completed section of Interstate 435.

== Grand opening ==
The grand opening of Metcalf South took place on August 3, 1967, with ceremonies featuring Mayor Duard Enoch of Overland Park and Debbie Bryant, Miss America of 1966. A crowd estimated at nearly 10,000 attended the opening day events. Most of the new stores in Metcalf South Center participated in the official grand opening, while Sears, the south anchor, would open for business in October 1967.

== 1975 expansion ==
A new third level concourse was added in 1975. This addition comprised approximately 103,500 leasable square feet and included businesses such as Spencer Gifts, Taco Via, Smaks Hamburgers, and Orange Julius. A subsequent addition, built at around the same time, expanded the existing Jones Store by 38,000 square feet, for a total area of 221,000 square feet. A lower level parking deck was included. With these expansions, Metcalf South grew to 800,000 leasable square feet with 3 levels of retail space.

== 1989-1990 renovations ==
Between 1989 and 1990, the entire shopping complex was given an interior facelift. This included the installation of chrome and mirrored ceilings and marquee lighting fixtures. A vacant Woolworth was sectioned into 2 levels of inline stores, including a Food Court on Level 2 of the mall. Moreover, the Safeway space was refitted as Carrousel Park, a mini amusement area with a video arcade, carousel, and roller coaster.

== Decline ==
The newly renovated Metcalf South was soon to face two formidable competitors in addition to the existing Oak Park Mall, which opened in 1974. Town Center Plaza, a lifestyle-type venue 2.7 miles southeast in Leawood, was dedicated in 1996. The Great Mall of the Plains, 10.4 miles southwest in Olathe, opened in 1997. Metcalf South was unable to compete, and by the early 2000s had declined into a virtually vacant, dead mall. Nearby Glenwood Mall closed in May 2007 and was demolished in early 2009.

== 2018 planned redevelopment ==
On July 11, 2016, the Overland Park Planning Commission approved a plan that will allow the developer Lane4 to invest $80 million to redevelop the location into a Lowe's to open in May 2018. The Lowe's opened in August 2018 at the space that was once occupied by Macy's and Glenwood Arts.
