= Town Pavilion =

Office skyscraper in Kansas City, Missouri

1111 Main
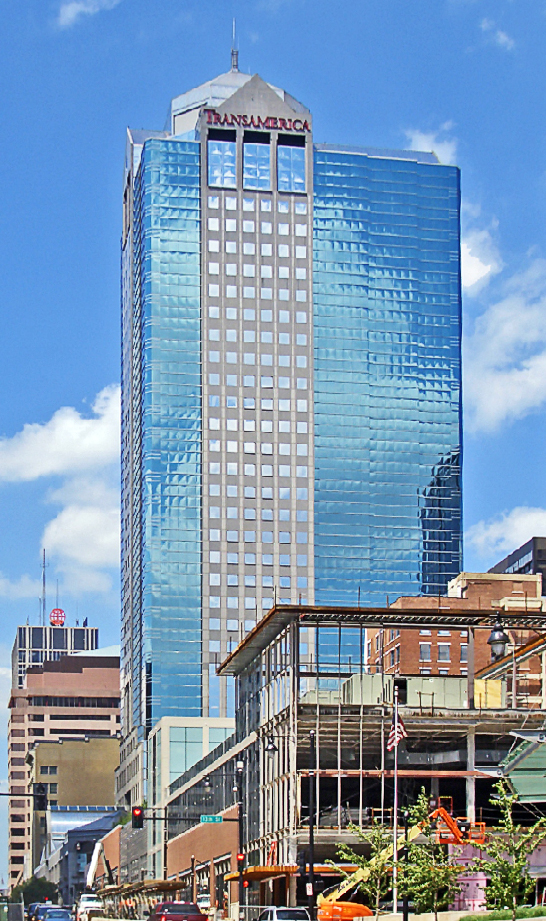
- Interactive map of the 1111 Main area

General information
- Status: Completed
- Type: Commercial offices
- Location: 1111 Main Street; Kansas City, Missouri
- Coordinates: 39°06′02″N 94°34′58″W
- Completed: 1986; 40 years ago
- Owner: Copaken Brooks, LLC
- Operator: Copaken Brooks, LLC

Height
- Roof: 591 ft (180 m)

Technical details
- Floor count: 38
- Floor area: 1,200,000 sq ft (110,000 m^{2})
- Lifts/elevators: 18

Design and construction
- Architect: HNTB
- Main contractor: J. E. Dunn Construction

Other information
- Public transit: RideKC; KC Streetcar

Website
- townpavilionkc.com

1111 Main is a 38-story, 591 ft (180 m) skyscraper at 1111 Main Street on the northeast corner of 12th and Main Streets in Downtown Kansas City, Missouri, around the corner from Oppenstein Brothers Memorial Park. The tower occupies the former site of several retail buildings, including Kline's Department Store and Kresge's Dime Store. The 11-story former Harzfeld's Department Store and the former Boley Building were preserved and have been integrated into the design of 1111 Main.

Completed in 1986, 1111 Main is the second-tallest habitable building in Kansas City (behind One Kansas City Place), and it is the third-tallest in the state of Missouri (behind One Metropolitan Square in St. Louis). The building's main tenants are HNTB Corporation (national headquarters), Bank Midwest (national headquarters), Federal Deposit Insurance Corporation (FDIC), and the National Association of Insurance Commissioners (NAIC).

== Background ==
1111 Main was originally constructed as the AT&T Town Pavilion and opened in 1986. It was built as the Southwest Regional Headquarters for AT&T, which has remained a tenant. However, in about 1997, due to AT&T's drastic downsizing, it was no longer the major tenant for the building. For a while, Transamerica occupied most of the office space and placed its name and logo at the top of the tower. At some time, Bank Midwest's name replaced Transamerica's on the building. In 2026, HNTB placed their signage on the SouthEast and West sides of the building when the company moved their national headquarters into the building. The project was undertaken as a joint venture between AT&T Resource Management (AT&T's Real Estate Group) and Copaken, White & Blitt.

The architect was HNTB of Kansas City. It was built as a mixed-use office-retail complex. The main components were the three-story retail base (which included a food court on the third floor) and the 34-story office tower. This component occupied the entire block of Walnut Street, Main Street, 11th Street (Petticoat Lane), and 12th Street. AT&T's official entrance was at 1100 Walnut St., and the official retail entrance was at 1111 Main St. Also included in this component were two historic renovations: the Harzfeld's building on the corner of 11th and Main and the Boley Building on the corner of 12th and Walnut that Andrews McMeel Universal currently occupies. The Boley building was touted as the first example of French iron curtain wall construction in the United States. This main component was attached to two anchor stores, The Jones Store and Macy's, via sky bridges. There was a sky bridge crossing Walnut Street to the 1201 Walnut office tower, and a multi-level parking garage that also incorporated two historic renovations, retaining the façade of the Jenkins Music building, and the Bonfils Building at the corner of 12th and Grand.

== History ==
1111 Main was completed in 1986, temporarily becoming the state's tallest building. It contained a shopping mall that was anchored by Dillard's and the Jones Store Co. Two years later, it was surpassed in height by One Kansas City Place, which is located at the same 12th and Main Streets intersection. Since its completion, it has hosted a significant amount of Downtown Kansas City's office and retail space, with over 1,200,000 sq ft (110,000 m^{2}) of office space. In 2023, it was renamed from Town Pavilion to 1111 Main.

It was developed by Frank Morgan and his uncle Sherman W. Dreiseszun (operating as MD Management), who would build One Kansas City Place.

== Appearance ==
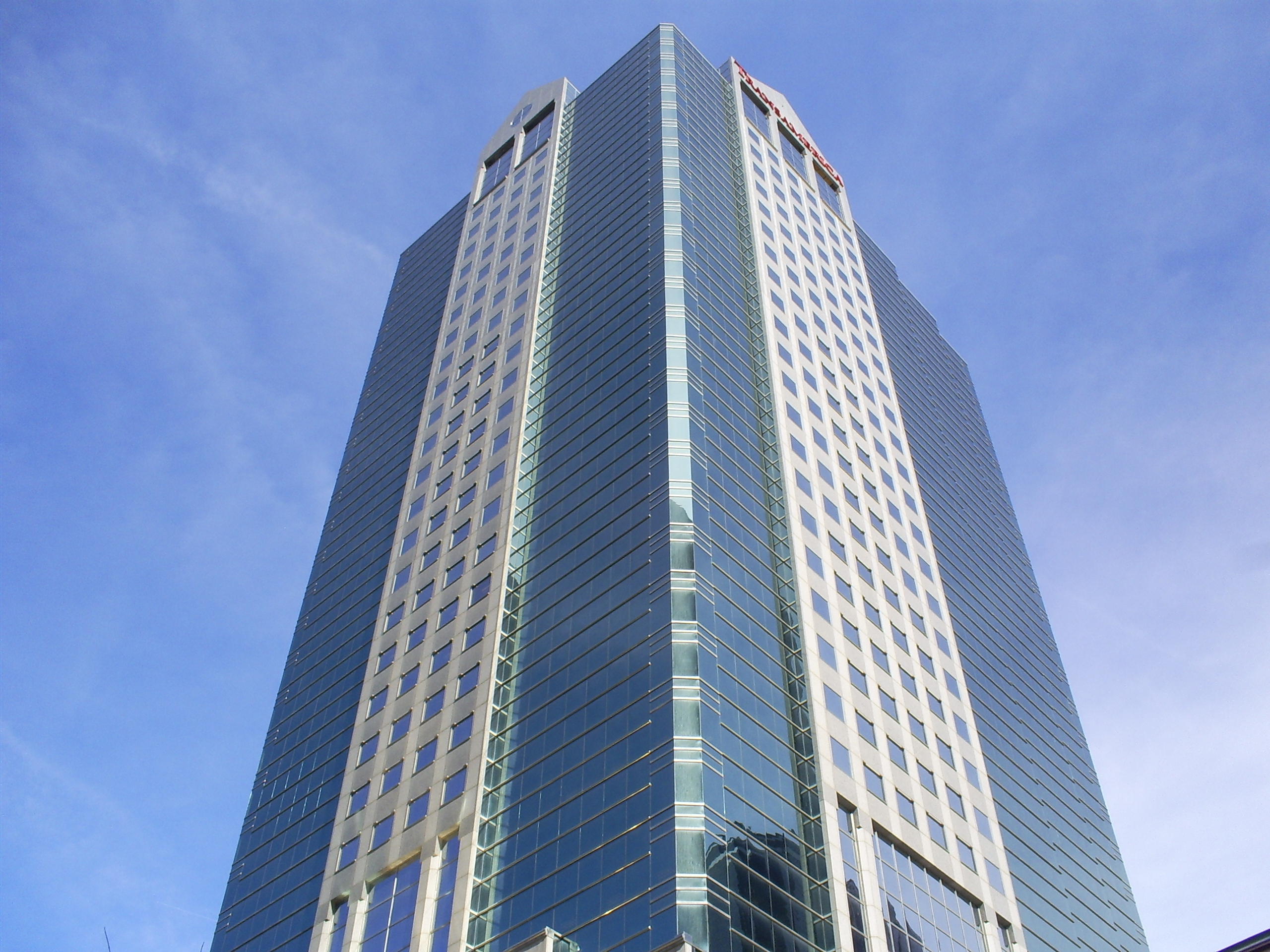
Town Pavilion from street level

The exterior of the building was constructed with granite and glass with steel trim. At least 90% of the building is enclosed in glazed glass, most of which is dark-blue. The structural system of the roof is in a truss form.

When viewed from the sky, this skyscraper appears to be a "glass cathedral" in the Latin Cross design. It is unknown whether the architect deliberately made this appearance.

== See also ==
- Architecture in Kansas City
- One Kansas City Place - Nearby skyscraper, tallest habitable structure in Missouri
