= Metro North =

Metro North may refer to:

- Metro-North Railroad, a commuter railroad serving parts of New York and Connecticut in the United States
- Dublin Metro#Metro North, a branch of the proposed Dublin Metro, in Dublin, Ireland
- Metro North Mall, Kansas City, Missouri
- MetroNorth Corridor, proposed St. Louis MetroLink alignment
