= Hypermart USA =

Defunct American store

- Type: Subsidiary
- Industry: Retail
- Founded: 1987; 39 years ago
- Defunct: 2000
- Fate: Project discontinued All four Buildings converted to Walmart Supercenter. Two eventually closed down, and got demolished.
- Number of locations: 4 (at peak)
- Products: Food, clothing, footwear, bedding, furniture, jewelry, beauty products, electronics and housewares.
- Parent: Walmart

Hypermart USA (or Walmart's Hypermart USA after 1990) was a demonstrator project operated by Walmart in the 1980s and 1990s, which attempted to combine groceries and general merchandise under one roof at a substantial discount. The hypermart concept was modeled after earlier efforts from other retailers, notably French retailers such as Auchan and Carrefour, and the Midwestern big retailer Meijer. At its peak, Hypermart USA had four locations with two located in Texas, one in Kansas, and one in Missouri.

All stores used a floorplan that exceeded 220,000 square feet (20,000 m^{2}) (which was about 42,000 square feet larger than an average Walmart Supercenter in 2022 and about 40,000 less square feet than the current largest Walmart Supercenter in Albany, New York). They featured a mini-mall, food court, arcade, bank, and other kiosk operations. The ones in Kansas City and Topeka featured McDonald's, Subway, and Popeyes Louisiana Kitchen in their food courts.

== History ==
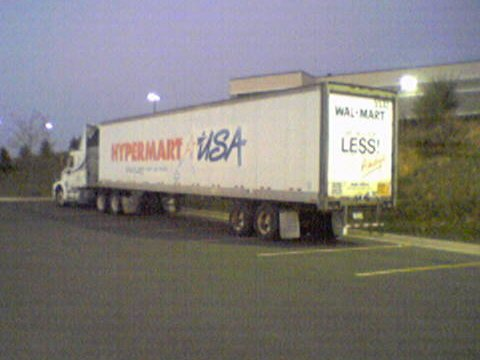
A Hypermart USA truck sits in a Walmart parking lot in 2005, long after the concept was discontinued.

The prototypes were originally going to be named “Wal-Mart Supercenter”. However, the name was shelved in order for its name “Hypermart USA”. The name was later recycled for Walmart Supercenter. The prototype did not go as well as planned. Walmart was unaccustomed to operating such massive stores, and an economic recession in the early 1990s had brought on a decline in retail sales. Although the stores were profitable, sales projections were too optimistic and the company did not anticipate the great heating and cooling costs, the resistance of customers towards parking and congestion issues.

The first Walmart Supercenter, which used a floorplan in the 125,000 sq ft (11,600 m^{2}) range, was opened in 1988 in Washington, Missouri. As the Supercenter proved to be a much more profitable experiment, Walmart renamed the stores "Wal-Mart's Hypermart USA" in April 1990, and eventually began converting them to Supercenter operations. As of 2023, two of the former Hypermart USA locations still operate as Walmart Supercenters while the other two have been demolished.

The Hypermart USA concept was officially discontinued in 2000, when Walmart announced it was converting the Kansas City Hypermart USA into a Walmart Supercenter. The former Kansas City store, then a Supercenter, ultimately closed in January 2007. The original Hypermart in Garland, Texas closed in May 2008. The Topeka, Kansas, hypermarket, located on Southwest Wanamaker Road, is still open, although its exterior has been remodeled as well as the Arlington, Texas, location on South Cooper Street.

Later Walmart Supercenter locations such as the one in Crossgates Commons exceed the size in square feet of even the biggest Hypermart USA location, however the Kansas City Hypermart remains the largest-ever building footprint of Walmart as of 2025, with the Doral, MI location at the 2nd place.

Similar to Walmart, Hypermart has its own cheer:

Hypermart’s store that is out of sight.
The prices are low and the star is bright.
America’s new way to shop and save.
Hypermart, Hypermart, USA.
Who’s No. 1 now?
Hypermart!
Who’s No. 1 now?
Hypermart!
Competition, get on down!

Uh!

== Locations ==
=== Garland, Texas ===
Garland, Texas (December 28, 1987)

Upon launching at 213,000/226,000 sq ft, this location had 20,000 visitors at launch day. This location was converted several years later to a Walmart Supercenter and lost its Hypermart USA branding. By May 2008, Walmart announced it would replace this store with a smaller Supercenter nearby. In October 2017, it was announced that the city of Garland would buy the vacant site with intentions of redeveloping it as a "gateway" to the city. It was demolished in the summer of 2018, after being abandoned for a decade and homeless moved in, and multiple complaints over the abandoned property ensured. Uses for the site such as self-storage and athletic centers failed.

This location had:

- photo processing center
- tortilla factory in the bakery, that could produce 20,000 tortillas a day
- full-service seafood shop
- hair salon
- portrait studio
- video rental store
- food court (with 8 occupants)
- supervised play area for kids.
- "Wall of Value", an entire aisle of discounted goods.
- Bank
- Shoe repair shop
- Deli with 15c coffee
- 1,600 space parking lot
- Optician
- Babysitting service
- 58 checkout stations
- In-store hotlines for get information and in-store navigation.

=== Topeka, Kansas ===
Topeka, Kansas (January 1988)

This location was so popular that the transit authority added stops at the Hypermart. As of 2025, the Topeka, Kansas store is still operating as a Walmart Supercenter.

=== Arlington, Texas ===
Arlington, Texas (August 1988)

As of 2025, the Arlington, Texas, Hypermart is still operating as a Walmart Supercenter.

=== Kansas City, Missouri ===
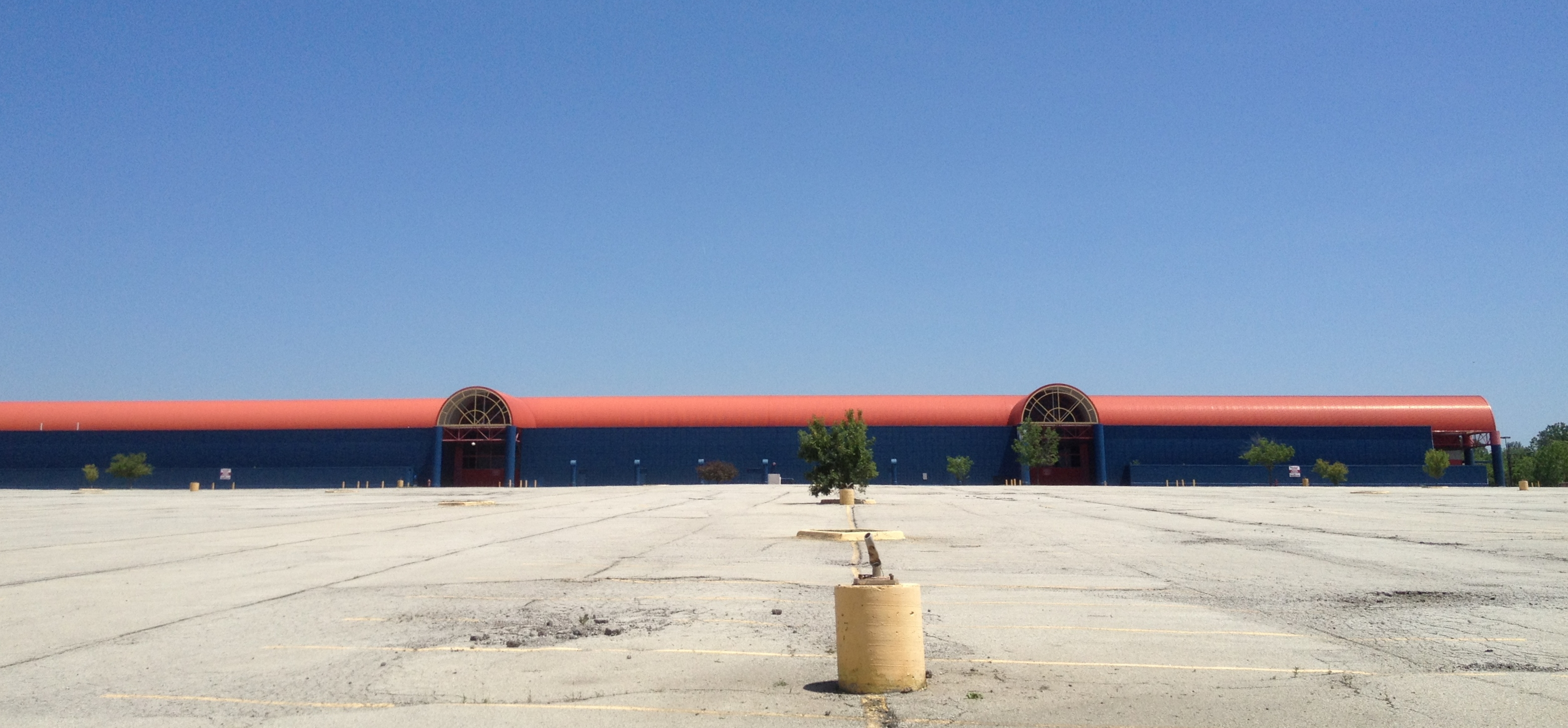
The location, abandoned after being both under the Hypermart USA and Walmart Supercenter branding, pre-demolition

The Kansas City, Missouri, location opened on February 20, 1990. Located just northeast of the now-closed Bannister Mall in the Benjamin Plaza development, the South Kansas City store was the last Hypermart USA to open. It was the largest of the four Hypermart stores at 256,637 sq ft (23,842 m^{2}). Described as Walmart's "mall without walls," the Kansas City Hypermart included a number of restaurants and specialty outlets in addition to the combination grocery and general merchandise discount store.

- Food court with seating for 200 people, with quick service restaurants including Taco John's, Corn Dog 7, V's Pasta Parlor, Torre's Pizzeria, Oasis (ice cream, shakes, and frozen yogurt), Subway, and McDonald's.
- United Missouri City Bank
- Hypermart Pharmacy
- Aladdin's Castle arcade
- Cost Cutters, family hair salon
- Family Vision Center
- Travel Center Ltd.
- Hearing Today Laboratory
- ShoeSmith
- 1-Hour Photo-Mart
- American Studios, Inc, portrait studio
- HyperSound and Video
- "Wall of Value", an amentity which was stocked with items offered at large discounts.

In May 2000, Walmart announced it would spend $4.9 million (~$8.46 million in 2024) to convert the Kansas City Hypermart USA to a Walmart Supercenter. Walmart indicated that it was converting its last remaining Hypermart, because the stores were too big and too inconvenient for customers. Walmart explained that the effort of offering everything under one roof was more of a European style of retail, and it was overwhelming to the American shopper. Kansas City Councilman Chuck Eddy claimed that there were other reasons for the failure of the Kansas City Hypermart. Eddy cited a high volume of complaints from residents about the store, including time-consuming lines at checkout counters, trash and runaway carts in the parking lot, dirty restrooms, and overall messy conditions and poor management. Walmart wanted to build a new Supercenter store in South Kansas City on State Line Road near 135th Street, so city leaders pressured Walmart to make improvements to the conditions of the Hypermart location before they would be given approval to move forward with the new South Kansas City store. At the time, Walmart said it would cost almost $5 million to renovate the 270,000 sq ft (25,000 m^{2}) Hypermart store. Walmart moved forward with the renovation and conversion of the Hypermart store, along with bringing in new management to address the concerns of poor management at the store. In 2006, Walmart began construction on a new Walmart Supercenter on the site of the former Blue Ridge Mall. The new Supercenter was to be the first of Walmart's new "high-efficiency" stores. As a result of the new Supercenters on State Line Road and the former Blue Ridge Mall site, along with declining business and a growing number of retail closings in Bannister Mall and Benjamin Plaza, Walmart announced that it would close the former Hypermart store in mid-January 2007. The 400 employees were offered jobs at the new Blue Ridge store and other area Walmart stores. After seven years of vacancy, the former Kansas City Hypermart was demolished in 2014 along with much of the surrounding vacant retail developments as part of a large redevelopment project.

== See also ==
- American Fare - KMart's equivalent
