= Bannister Mall =

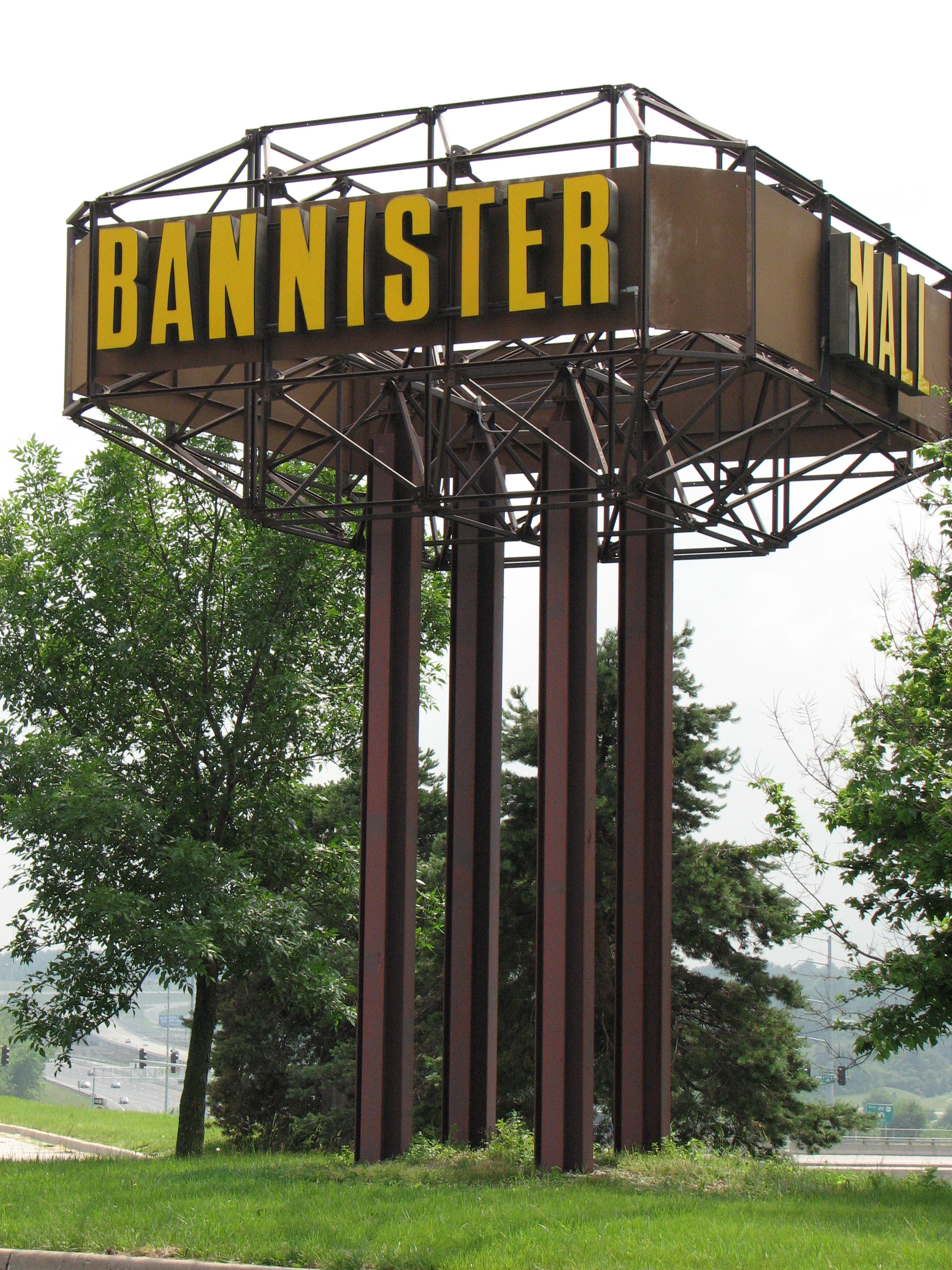
- Location: Kansas City, Missouri, United States
- Coordinates: 38°57′27″N 94°31′26″W
- Address: 5600 Bannister Road
- Opened: August 6, 1980
- Closed: May 31, 2007
- Demolished: 2009
- Developer: Copaken White & Blitt, Mall Developers and Homart Development Company
- Owner: Stanley Spigel
- Num. of stores: 180 at peak
- Num. of anchor tenants: 4
- Floor area: 1,100,000 sq ft (100,000 m^{2})
- Floors: 2

Bannister Mall was a shopping mall in the southeast corner of Kansas City, Missouri. It opened on August 6, 1980. After nearly 27 years of operation, it closed on May 31, 2007. It was originally anchored by Macy's (which became Dillard's in 1986), JCPenney, The Jones Store, and Sears.

== History ==
Bannister Mall was built and opened in August 1980 at 5600 Bannister Road in Kansas City, Missouri between I-435 and Hillcrest Road. The area was once the site of the Three Trails (Santa Fe, California, and Oregon) and the Santa Fe trail actually crossed the original property. The mall was one of the largest malls in the Kansas City area and in the region in a previously vital and vibrant shopping area. The mall's original anchors were Macy's, JCPenney, The Jones Store and Sears. In the early 1980s, Bannister Mall was the "place to go" with a draw over a large area that was mostly from South Kansas City, suburban Jackson County, Missouri, and Johnson County, Kansas. In 1988-1990, an area north and east of the mall called Benjamin Plaza was added to the commercial retail area.

In the late 1980s, bus service from mid-town Kansas city was extended to the area, and by the mid to late 1990s with newer and more desirable developments further south and in Johnson County Kansas, the area began to wane. Also, due to consistent crime, the area around Bannister Mall earned a bad reputation. This combination led to the present blight of the area. JCPenney closed in 2000, followed by Dillard's in 2002 and The Jones Store in early 2005. In 2006, Sears closed leaving the mall anchor-less. Bannister Mall once hosted 180 stores, but by 2007 only 50 stores were open.

In April 2007, it was announced that due to low population and rising costs of operation that the mall would close. At the time, only half of the mall was open, with the northern part blocked off. The failure of the mall was largely due to migration to the suburbs and a perception of the area being unsafe. The only new construction in the area is the replacement of the Kansas City Fire Department's Fire Station 41, which once was facing Bannister Road and now is facing Hillcrest Road. The nearby Walmart Supercenter closed in January 2007, which was a day before a new Walmart opened on the site of the former Blue Ridge Mall now called Blue Ridge Crossing. The Bannister Wal-Mart was one of the company's earliest Hypermart stores, but it later changed to the Supercenter format. At the end of May 2007, Bannister Mall closed its doors.

== Demolition and redevelopment ==
The mall was demolished in early 2009. In December 2009, the Kansas City Wizards, who had previously planned to build a new stadium on the site, finalized plans to build their stadium in Kansas instead. Lane4 Property Group, Inc. stated that they would continue development of the Bannister Mall site, but as a retail and office project called The Trails. After much delay on August 1, 2013 Cerner Corporation, a large medical information technology firm based in the Kansas City area, announced they would redevelop the former Bannister Mall location as a major office park housing future expansion of their corporation and perhaps other business entities as well. Cerner will acquire 236 acres to meet expected future growth of the company and could eventually employ an additional 12,000 to 15,000 workers. According to Cerner officials the site will include a training center, potential future data centers, and worker amenities such as on-site daycare, a health clinic, food service, and a fitness center. The corporation may also make a portion of the land available for other business developments such as a hotel, retail stores, and restaurants. Cerner had originally expressed interest in the site in 2009, and at various other times since, however a deal could not be finalized.
