= West Ridge Mall =

- Coordinates: 39°02′00″N 95°45′58″W
- Address: 1801 SW Wanamaker Road; Topeka, Kansas 66604
- Opened: March 2, 1988; 38 years ago
- Developer: Melvin Simon & Associates
- Owner: Advisors Excel
- Num. of stores: 50+
- Num. of anchor tenants: 5 (3 open, 2 vacant)
- Floor area: 992,000 square feet (92,160 m^{2})
- Floors: 2
- Public transit: Topeka Metro
- Website: westridgemall.com

West Ridge Mall is an enclosed shopping mall in Topeka, Kansas. The mall has three open anchor stores: Dillard's, Furniture Mall of Kansas, JCPenney. (which is now closed as of September 2025.) There are two vacant anchors that were formerly Sears and Burlington. It is the third largest enclosed mall in the state of Kansas, behind Oak Park Mall in Overland Park and Towne East Square in Wichita.

== History ==
The mall opened on March 2nd, 1988 under the development of Melvin Simon & Associates. Vanna White made a guest appearance at the ribbon-cutting ceremony. Original tenants included JCPenney, Dillard's, Sears, which closed in September 2018, and The Jones Store. Montgomery Ward would add a store in 1990. It also included a movie theater called the West Ridge 6, which had a Baskin-Robbins inside.

Montgomery Ward closed at the mall in 2001, due to their bankruptcy. Another original tenant, Old Country Buffet, closed in 2003, followed by the movie theater in 2005. The Montgomery Ward building was briefly used for an exhibit by the Kansas International Museum, and became Burlington Coat Factory in 2007 and closed in January 2018. Macy's acquired The Jones Store's parent company in 2006, thus returning Macy's to Topeka after the chain's downtown store closed in 1986. The Macy's closed in March 2012. The former Macy's became Furniture Mall of Kansas in late 2013.

The mall was sold to the Kohan Retail Investment Group in late 2021. The mall was sold to Advisors Excel, a local company in Topeka, in September 2023. On January 25, 2025, it was announced that JCPenney would close on May 25, leaving Dillard's and Furniture Mall of Kansas as the only anchors left.
