= Oppenstein Brothers =

The Oppenstein Brothers (Louis, Sam, Harry, and Michael) were four brothers from Denver Colorado that operated a jewelry business in the early 20th century. They moved to Kansas City and became successful in the jewelry industry and real-estate investments. The legacy of the business would be the creation of the Oppenstein Brothers Foundation, which helping the local community in Kansas City.

== Business ==
In the late 19th century the eldest brother, Louis Oppenstein, used $1,500 from his father's life insurance to purchase a Denver jewelry store where he had worked for a year to support his family after his father's death. Louis Oppenstein became the head of his family at the age of 14. Louis was able to employ his brothers as they came of age, and by 1898 the group was able to operate a much larger store in Denver.

In 1902 the brothers moved from Denver to Kansas City, Missouri, where they purchased the Herman Streicher Watch and Jewelry Company at 1017 Main Street. The shop became quite a success, and Louis was able to invest in Kansas City real estate.

In 1919 the brothers purchased the Navarro building in Kansas City. The brothers, though quite wealthy, were publicly modest; they used their wealth to help support various communities in Kansas City, including its Jewish community.

Louis Oppenstein died at age 63 from a heart attack; his funeral drew over 1,000 attendees. His three surviving brothers who sold the jewelry business after Louis' death and eventually the proceeds were used to form the Oppenstein Brothers Foundation which was established in 1941. Louis Oppenstein's generosity was summed up in his obituary: "He responded eagerly to those in distress and despair, and to every call of philanthropy. He felt a special responsibility to those who ran amiss of the law. Lives were rehabilitated through his compassion and generosity.

== Legacy ==
The legacy of the brothers continues to today through the Oppenstein Brothers Foundation, which started distributing funds in 1976. The Foundation administers funds "for religious, charitable, scientific and educational purposes".

Louis Oppenstein was remembered not only for business, but for contributions to the community in a variety of roles including president of the board of public works, city councilman, police commissioner, and as a member of the Board of Education. One specific grant that was particularly impactful was approved by the Oppenstein Brothers Foundation in the late 1980s for a collaboration with the Kansas City, Kansas School District. The grant impacted 40 participants with income need during the first year of existence and was focused on providing services similar to the Economic Opportunity Foundation that helped adults obtain high school diploma.

In addition to many of grants to a variety of causes, the Oppenstein Brothers Memorial Park in Kansas city was named in honor of the four Oppenstein Brothers.
