= Hickory Point Mall =

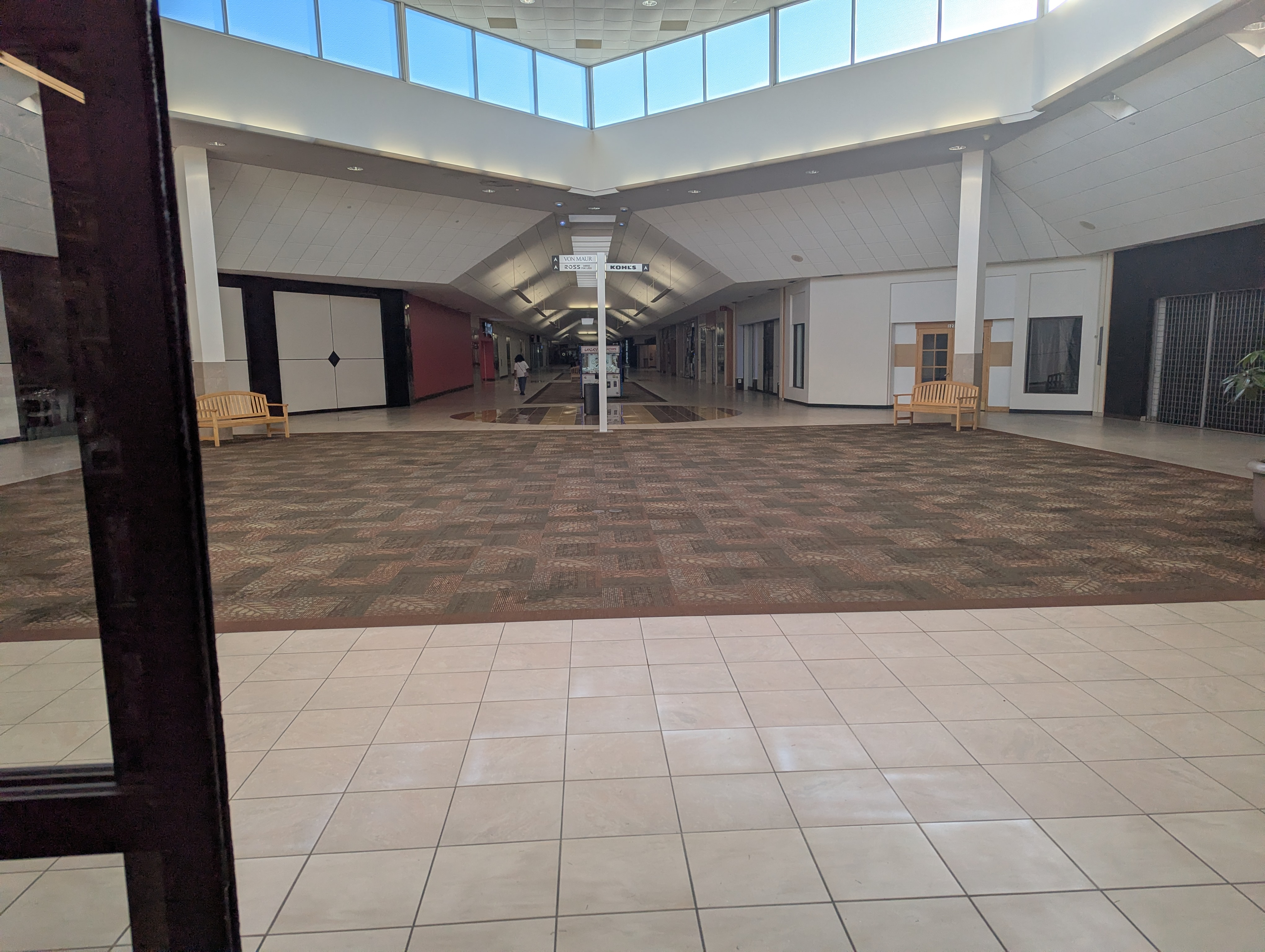
- Interior of a wing of the mall, as seen from within Hobby Lobby
- Location: Forsyth, Illinois, United States
- Coordinates: 39.91805°N 88.96006°W
- Address: 1146 Hickory Point Mall
- Opened: 1978
- Developer: Copaken, White & Blitt
- Owner: Namdar Realty Group
- Num. of stores: 49 (37 inside the mall, 12 outside the mall)
- Num. of anchor tenants: 10 (7 open, 3 vacant)
- Floor area: 826,347 square feet (77,000 m^{2})
- Floors: 1 (2 in former Bergner's)
- Public transit: Decatur Public Transit System
- Website: hickorypoint.com

Hickory Point Mall is a shopping mall in Forsyth, Illinois, United States. The mall opened in 1978. The anchor stores are Kohl's, Von Maur, TJ Maxx, Hobby Lobby, Ulta Beauty, Ross Dress for Less, and Shoe Dept. Encore. The mall is managed by Namdar Realty Group. There are 3 vacant anchor stores that were once JCPenney, Sears, and Bergner's.

== History ==
In the early 1970s, developers Copaken, White & Blitt proposed building a mall in Decatur, Illinois. The city spent a year negotiating with the developers, but downtown merchants heavily lobbied against it, and in a July 1974 vote, the Decatur City Council rejected the mall by one vote. The developers instead built the mall in Forsyth, a village just north of Decatur, and it opened in October 1978. The mall's original anchors included JCPenney, Bergner's, and Carson Pirie Scott (later rebranded as Carson's), all of which relocated from downtown Decatur. Kohl's was added in 1983 as a fourth anchor, and expanded in 2003. In the summer of 1989, Carson Pirie Scott's new parent company P.A. Bergner(Bergner's)sold this store and another at College Hills Mall (now The Shoppes at College Hills) in Normal to Von Maur. MC Sports and Sears were added in 1998, with the latter relocating from a store in downtown Decatur. A year later, Gap Inc. announced plans to open Gap, GapKids, and Old Navy stores.

In July 1993, Lowe's Home Improvement opened across the street from the mall. Applebee's then opened in its surrounding area in October 1994. On May 17, 1999, Texas Roadhouse opened to the public. Three years later in 2002, Red Lobster officially opened.

In 2000, Copaken, White & Blitt renovated the interior. CBL & Associates Properties bought the mall in 2005.

Steve & Barry's opened in late 2007, and closed less than a year later. MC Sports moved its store across the hallway in late 2008. Old Navy closed in 2010 and was re-tenanted by Cohn Furniture later that same year. Shoe Show opened a Shoe Dept. Encore in the space vacated by Steve & Barry's.

Some scenes from the 2009 film The Informant! were filmed at the mall.

In January 2014, it was announced that JCPenney would be closing its store by May 2014, followed by Sears in November. In September 2014 the mall opened Ross Dress for Less and Ulta Beauty. In October 2014, CBL Properties announced that Hobby Lobby had executed a lease for 60,000 square feet in the space formerly occupied by JCPenney and that it would relocate into the mall from its former location on Pershing Road.

In December 2014, Sears announced that they would close there anchor store permanently.

The mall announced on October 21, 2016, that T.J. Maxx would be relocating to this mall. Hibbett Sports opened a store in the fall of 2017.

KombatBall MAX, an affiliate of Knockerball USA, opened in October 2017. KombatBall MAX offers open play and private parties for Bubbleball in the United States, which is a recent growing trend nationwide. Taking over the spot previously held by the former Kirlin's Hallmark, KombatBall MAX boasts the largest arena of its kind in America. It is no longer open.

Wisconsin-based Book World closed its doors in 2017 after filing for bankruptcy and liquidating all stock. Its previous tenant was Waldenbooks. The company had 20 stores in Wisconsin and also had stores in Minnesota, Michigan, Missouri, Illinois, Iowa and North Dakota.

On August 29, 2018, anchor tenant Bergner's permanently closed its doors after 40 years of business at Hickory Point, following the bankruptcy and liquidation of parent company Bon-Ton Stores.

In August 2020, CBL & Associates sold the mall to Namdar Realty Group.
