= Metro North Mall =

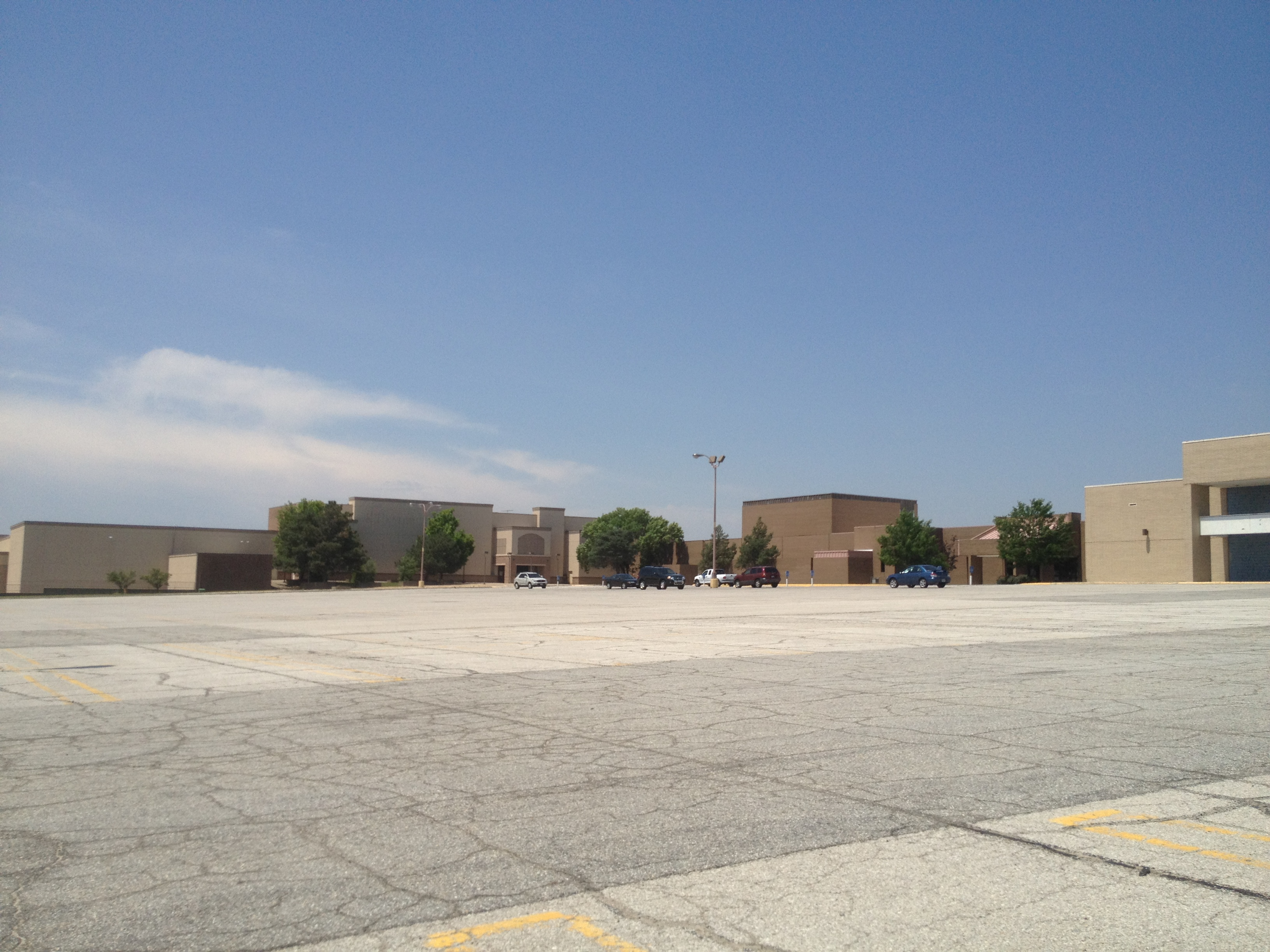
- Metro North Mall in state of decline, May 2012
- Location: Kansas City North, Missouri, United States
- Coordinates: 39°14′58″N 94°35′09″W
- Address: 400 NW Barry Road
- Opened: September 8, 1976; 50 years ago
- Closed: April 15, 2014; 12 years ago
- Developer: Sherman Dreiseszun; Frank Morgan
- Owner: Metro North Crossing LLC
- Num. of stores: 150 at peak, 2 at time of closing
- Num. of anchor tenants: 1 (3 at peak) (1 closing)
- Floor area: 1,300,000 sq ft (120,000 m^{2})
- Floors: 2
- Parking: 7,500+

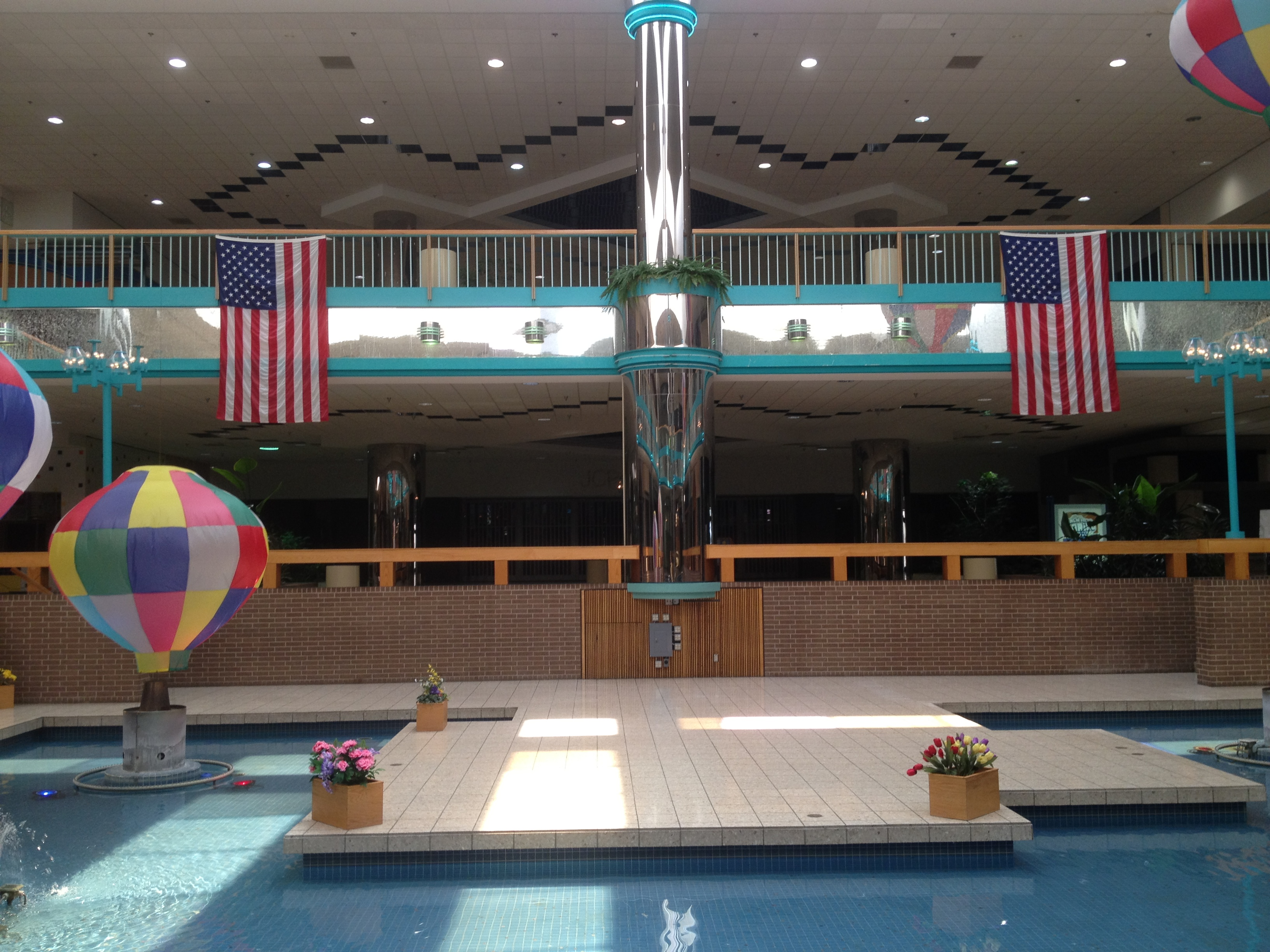
Pool area in Metro North Mall, May 2012

Metro North Mall was a 1,300,000 sq ft (120,000 m^{2}) shopping mall in Kansas City, Missouri, United States.

Metro North opened in 1976 and was the only enclosed mall located north of the Missouri River in the Kansas City metro area, as well as being the second largest mall in the area, behind Oak Park Mall in Overland Park, Kansas. It was developed by Frank Morgan and his uncle Sherman Dreiseszun.

After a decade of decline and left with only two inline stores, the mall closed on April 15, 2014, and the mall was completely demolished in early 2017, with the exception of the Macy's anchor store, which continued to operate until its closure in March 2025.

== History ==
Metro North Mall opened in September 1976, with 1.3 million sq. ft. of retail space that included 125 storefronts and 4 anchor stores on two levels. The center of the mall featured a 1980s-style center court area with a stage surrounded by a pool of water, which included four mini hot-air balloons suspended from the ceiling that floated up and down. There was no designated "eatery" location in the mall, but the layout included a logical entertainment end which featured two restaurants (Dairy Queen and In-a-Tub), a six-screen AMC theater, and an arcade (Nickelodeon). The popularity of the mall increased during holiday season. At one point, the mall management organized usage of the parking trams from Worlds of Fun to influence customers to park further from the building. By 1990, many restaurants were built at the border of the mall's property and AMC built a second six-screen theater directly behind the mall.

By 2000, the owners of the mall began development of a competing set of strip malls, Zona Rosa. They increased leases at Metro North, pushing clients to move to the new location. The former Montgomery Ward store closed in 2001. Both AMC theaters closed. JCPenney closed in mid-2008, in favor of opening two new stores. Dillard's converted to a clearance center in 2007, closing off the lower level of the store. Dillard's later left the mall in late 2008, in favor of a new location in nearby Zona Rosa. MC Sporting Goods operated as a junior anchor in part of the former Montgomery Ward store until it closed in March 2009; Macy's (which originally opened as The Jones Store) was the last store remaining.

Plans for redeveloping the ailing shopping center via a partnership with Alberta Development Partners were released in 2007. It cited turning Metro North into an outdoor lifestyle center, although the plans fell through shortly after being released, due to the recession and death of mall owner Sherman Dreiseszun. In 2010, new redevelopment plans with MD Management Inc. surfaced, with intent to revitalize the shopping center that by this time had fallen to 17 percent occupancy with only one remaining anchor. These plans called for the majority of the present mall to be torn down and replaced by a smaller enclosed mall (rather than open-air shopping, as expected from the original developers), which will incorporate mixed uses in addition to the standard shopping mall. The redevelopment of the mall faced setbacks, but new announcements arose in May 2013 that MD Management Inc. was looking to raze the mall and replace it with a smaller, one-level enclosed mall featuring two anchor stores, due to demand for a viable enclosed mall to serve the Northland area.

In April 2014, MD Management announced that the mall would be shuttered on April 15, 2014. At the time of closure, only two inline stores remained: GNC and The Wig Shoppe. Macy's, the sole surviving anchor store, will remain open. On March 10, 2015, MD Management announced that IAS Partners Ltd. would acquire the shopping center in a deal set to close in April 2015. IAS envisions replacing the enclosed mall with a new open-air center that will include local and national retailers, multifamily housing and maybe office spaces.

In August 2016, it was announced that redevelopment plans by property owner Metro North Crossing LLC had received the proper re-zoning necessary to demolish and replace the existing mall structure with a mixed-use site including "734,000 square feet of retail space, 60,000 square feet of office space, 66,500 square feet of restaurant space, an 82,000-square-foot hotel and 117,000 square feet of residential units." The team planning for the redevelopment of Metro North Mall was responsible for the Antioch Crossing and Blue Ridge Crossing projects that replaced other indoor malls in the Kansas City area with a similar mixed-use design. In November 2016, images of the mall's interior shot by Seph Lawless showing the rapid deterioration of the property in the two years since its closure went viral as a last look inside the mall prior to its impending demolition. Lawless, known for photographing urban decay, described Metro North Mall as "the creepiest mall I've been in."

On January 9, 2025, it was announced that Macy's would be closing as part of a plan to close 66 stores nationwide. The store closed on March 23, 2025.
