= East Hills Shopping Center (Missouri) =

- Location: St. Joseph, Missouri, United States
- Coordinates: 39°46′28″N 94°48′02″W
- Address: 3702 Frederick Ave, St Joseph, MO 64506
- Opened: 1965
- Developer: Sherman Dreiseszun
- Owner: Craig Realty Group
- Num. of stores: 50+ (20+ open)
- Num. of anchor tenants: 4 (1 open, 3 vacant)
- Floor area: 611,630 sq ft (56,822 m^{2})
- Floors: 1
- Public transit: St. Joseph Transit
- Website: shopeasthills.com

East Hills Shopping Center is an enclosed shopping mall in St. Joseph, Missouri, United States. Opened in 1965, the mall features JCPenney as its only anchor tenant.

== History ==
East Hills Shopping Center was built by Sherman Dreiseszun in 1965 as one of the first malls in the Midwestern United States. Original tenants included Montgomery Ward, JCPenney, Safeway Inc., Katz Drug, Woolworth's, and Hirsch Brothers department store. The mall was expanded in 1988, and Dillard's and Sears were added then.

Throughout the 1990s East Hills lost many tenants, including Woolworth's, Sunglass Hut, A&W, and Osco Drug (formerly Katz Drug). Montgomery Ward closed in 2001, when that retail chain declared bankruptcy. By 2005 a locally owned furniture retailer located in that space, and later closed. From 2005 to 2008, Gadzooks, Famous Footwear, Waldenbooks, Lerner New York, Lane Bryant, FYE, and Coach House Gifts (a Hallmark retailer) were other tenants to leave East Hills. The mall was renovated extensively throughout 2008 and 2009 with the addition of a food court, and in 2011 Gordmans opened in the former Montgomery Ward space. From 2012 on many other new tenants were announced and opened, including Christopher & Banks, Charlotte Russe, Justice, and Victoria's Secret. Off Broadway Shoes, Charming Charlie, The Children's Place, Fun Run, and Spencer Gifts were also new tenants recruited to East Hills.

In 2014, East Hills Shopping Center gained unexpected attention for a back-to-school ad that went viral on the Internet due to its perceived poor quality.

Later in 2015, Party City opened on the north side of the mall next to JCPenney. In May 2017, one of the anchor retailers, Sears, permanently closed its doors.

In 2018, the mall established an area of smaller shops, located behind Topsy's, called 'The River' which focus on featuring small town businesses and boutiques.

In January of 2019, Lids Closed its doors. In March of 2019 Charlotte Russe Closed its doors. In 2020, both Victoria's Secret & The Children's Place closed their Doors. In 2020, following a bankruptcy filing, Justice closed its doors along with all of its remaining locations. In early 2020 Foot Locker & Lady Foot Locker closed. In August 2020, Gordmans permanently closed its doors. The COVID-19 pandemic brought many businesses to a close. On August 20, 2022, Dillard's permanently closed its doors, leaving JCPenney as the last remaining anchor store. In January of 2023, American Eagle Closed its doors. In Early 2023, Champs Sports closed its doors. In April of 2023, Party City also closed their store. In the summer of 2023 Claire's left the mall and relocated to The Shops at North Village. In Late 2023, Spencer's left the mall and relocated to The Shops at North Village. In 2024 Journey's closed their doors. In May of 2024, Rue 21 Closed. In July of 2024, Bath & Body Works left the mall and relocated to The Shops at North Village. In June of 2026 Maurices left the mall and relocated to The Shops at North Village.

As of 2026, the mall's remaining stores consist of businesses like Fun Run, Off Broadway Shoes, Chinex, and JCPenney.
