= The Jones Store =

American chain of department stores

The Jones Store Co.
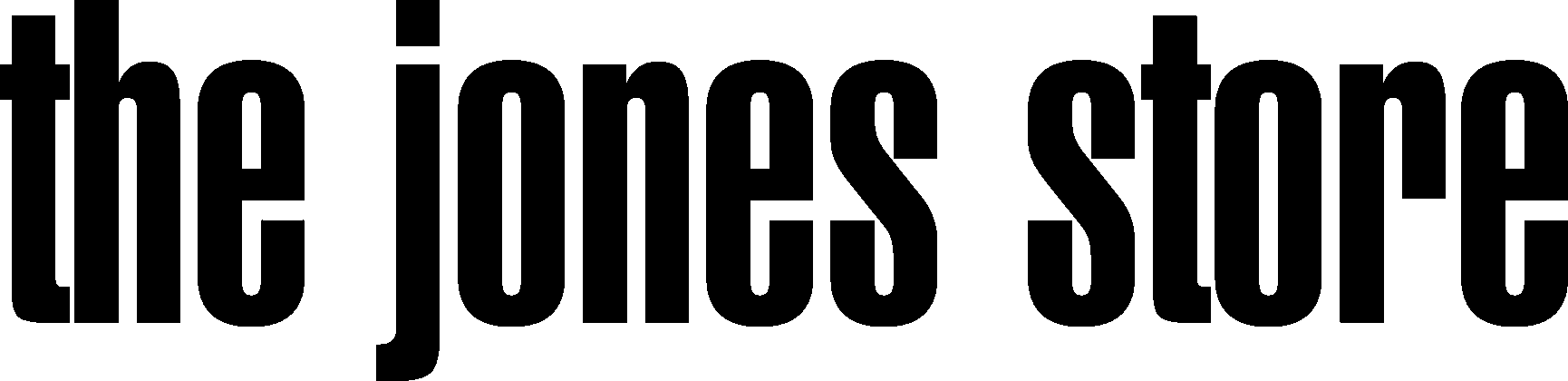
- Company type: Department store
- Industry: Retail
- Founded: 1887 in Stafford, Kansas, United States
- Founder: J. Logan Jones
- Defunct: 2006
- Fate: Acquired by Macy's
- Successor: Macy's
- Headquarters: Kansas City, Missouri, United States
- Products: Clothing, shoes, bedding, furniture, jewelry, beauty products, and housewares
- Parent: Mercantile Stores (1960–1998); The May Department Stores Company (1998–2005); Federated Department Stores, Inc. (2005–2006)
- Website: Archived official website at the Wayback Machine (archive index)

The Jones Store Company was an American chain of department stores located in the Kansas City area formerly operated by Mercantile Stores Company and the St. Louis, Missouri-based May Co.

== History ==
The Jones Store Company was founded in 1887 as an 800-square-foot (74 m^{2}) store in Stafford, Kansas, by J. Logan Jones.

In 1895, Jones opened a store at 6th and Main in the River Market neighborhood of Kansas City, Missouri. In 1902 Jones leased a 500,000-square-foot (46,000 m^{2}) seven-story building that took up an entire block at 12th Street and Main across the street from Bernheimer Bros. & Co.

Jones declared bankruptcy in 1910 and the store was taken over by New York interests.

In 1919, the new owners acquired the merchandise from Bernheimer Brothers.

The downtown flagship store remained in business until January 1998 even as other large retailers had left downtown. The building was demolished in 2005.

The Jones Store became a division of Mercantile Stores Company in the early 1960s. It was acquired by May Department Stores in 1998 after the Dillard's acquisition of Mercantile, and integrated into the company's Famous-Barr division. On August 30, 2005, it became part of Federated with that company's acquisition of May. On February 1, 2006, The Jones Store Co. was assumed by the new Macy's Midwest division of Federated.

On September 9, 2006, The Jones Store Co. name was phased out in favor of the Macy's nameplate, marking the second entry for Macy's into Kansas City and Topeka ever since the chain sold its original Kansas City stores to Dillard's in 1985. The original Jones Store locations included Downtown, Bannister Mall, Blue Ridge Mall, Metro North Mall, Oak Park Mall, Independence Center, Metcalf South Shopping Center, Town Center Plaza, Prairie Village Shopping Center, and West Ridge Mall.

== See also ==
- List of department stores converted to Macy's
