= The Shops at Fallen Timbers =

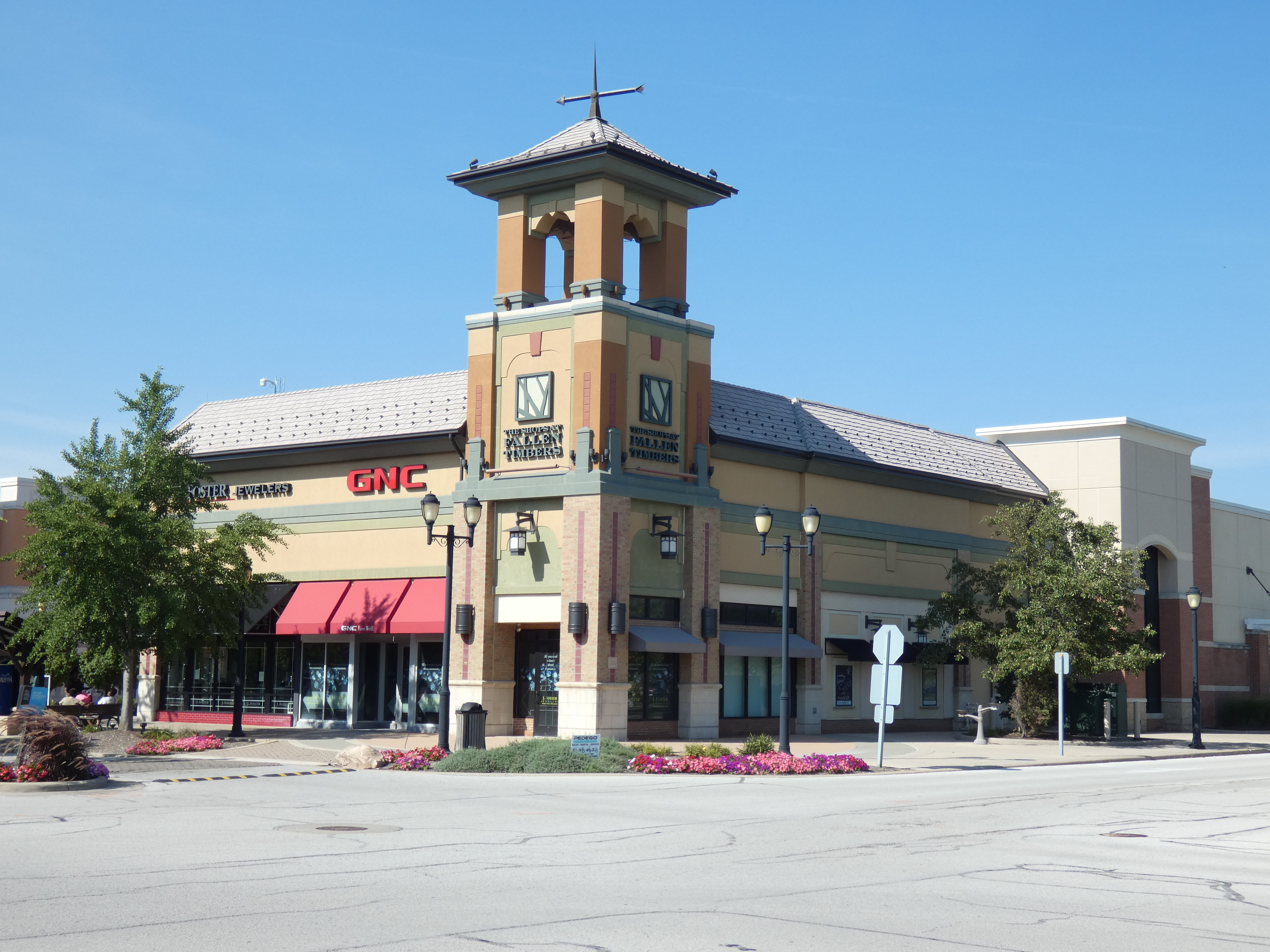
- Part of the shopping center on Main & Elm Street
- Location: Maumee, Ohio
- Coordinates: 41°32′50″N 83°42′22″W
- Address: 3100 Main St.
- Opened: October 2007; 19 years ago
- Developer: General Growth Properties
- Manager: Mason Asset Management & Namdar Realty Group
- Owner: Mason Asset Management & Namdar Realty Group
- Num. of stores: 56
- Num. of anchor tenants: 3
- Floor area: 605,575 square feet (56,000 m^{2})
- Floors: 1 (2 in Dillards)
- Website: theshopsatfallentimbers.com

The Shops at Fallen Timbers is a retail lifestyle center in Maumee, Ohio. The mall opened in October 2007 with three anchor stores: JCPenney, Dillard's and Barnes & Noble.

== History ==
General Growth Properties first conceived the idea of a mall in Maumee, Ohio in the mid-1990s. Initially, the mall was to have been an enclosed project, but in 2003, the company decided on building a lifestyle center. Stores that were proposed to open at the mall included Sears, Galyan's, Kaufmann's and Parisian.

In October 2007, the mall opened for business with Barnes & Noble, JCPenney and Dillard's, the latter of which moved from two stores at nearby Southwyck Mall, as its anchor stores. Two months later, Showcase Cinemas opened a multiplex theater complex at the mall. Upon opening, the mall included several tenants new to the Toledo market, such as P.F. Chang's and White House/Black Market.

In December 2017, the property was sold to Mason Asset Management & Namdar Realty Group for $21 million.
