= Mission Center Mall =

- Location: Mission, Kansas, United States
- Coordinates: 39°01′24″N 94°38′28″W
- Opened: 1956 as Mission Shopping Center; 1989 as Mission Center Mall
- Closed: 2006 (demolished March 2006)
- Owner: Copaken White Blitt
- Num. of stores: 50+
- Num. of anchor tenants: 2
- Floor area: 350,000 sq ft (33,000 m^{2})
- Floors: 2
- Parking: 2-level parking garage

Mission Center Mall was a small shopping mall in Mission, Kansas, located on a block of land wedged between four major roads, including Shawnee Mission Parkway and Johnson Drive, and Roe Boulevard and Roeland Drive. It opened in 1956 as Mission Shopping Center and was rebuilt in 1989. In 2006, Mission Center Mall was closed and demolished and the property vacated.

== History ==
Mission Center Mall began as Mission Shopping Center, which opened in 1956 as the major shopping center for the city of Mission, Kansas. It was designed as an open-air mall with a Macy's. The land was low and flooded very often, up to 10 feet (3.0 m) under water. In 1989 the mall was demolished and rebuilt completely from the ground up, leaving no trace of the old mall. Flooding was solved by building a huge double tunnel 30 feet (9.1 m) under the property in which Rock Creek now flows. Little Rock-based Dillard's had taken Macy's, and fashioned it into a Dillard's Women's Store, called "Dillard's South". The store on the opposite end of the mall ("Dillard's North") sold men's and children's apparel. The mall featured 50 leasable storefronts in 350,000 s.f. of space, and had a two-story parking garage.

The mall retained about a 65–75% occupancy throughout its life. Its design included massive skylights, decorative trees and banners, and a large staircase in the middle, with a pool of water beneath it. Mission Center Mall was owned by Copaken, White & Blitt.

In August 2005, plans were announced for the mall's sale, demolition, and replacement by a mixed-use development called The Gateway. The mall was closed and shuttered on February 12, 2006, giving the current 30 or so stores chances to relocate and sell off their merchandise. Both of the Dillards stores closed in late 2005, and Bath and Body Works closed after Christmas. The last stores to close were Wolf Camera and Christopher & Banks, which stayed open until closing day.

The mall was torn down in March 2006. The land has remained vacant since, now an overgrown patch of weeds with a steel fence surrounding out it. Walmart was announced as a tenant in late 2011. In May 2018, Colliers International released information about the development of the space, to begin before Oct 31 2018, that includes a hotel, apartments, and mixed retail space.
