= Southwyck Mall =

Former shopping mall in Toledo, Ohio

- Map of Southwyck Mall (1972)
- Location: Toledo, Ohio
- Coordinates: 41°36′10″N 83°40′05″W
- Opened: August 3, 1972
- Closed: June 29, 2008
- Demolished: June 2009
- Developer: Frank Morgan and Sherman Dreiseszun
- Num. of stores: 70+ at peak
- Num. of anchor tenants: 3
- Floor area: 850,000 square feet (79,000 m^{2})
- Floors: 1
- Parking: Uncovered, lit parking lot

Southwyck Mall was an enclosed super-regional shopping mall in southern Toledo, Ohio. The mall featured three anchor spaces, and a single level of in-line shops. At its peak, the shopping center held over 70 shops, and eateries within its halls. In 2009, the mall was demolished in favor of an open-air mall; which never materialized. The land is now home to an Amazon Distribution Center.

== History ==
=== Development and early years: 1970-1978 ===
Announced in February 1970, the mall developed by Kansas City developers Frank Morgan and Sherman Dreiseszun was to include three anhors; Lion Store, Montgomery Ward, and Lamson's, along with over 70 other smaller shops and the worlds first seven-screen theatre. The mall opened on August 3, 1972. By 1976, the Lamson's chain had filed bankruptcy; citing poor sales. They closed their centrally located Southwyck store the following year. In 1978, following Lamson's closure, The Lion Store announced plans for a second retail outlet at the mall. The store was to be the "Fashion Store for the Home," carrying home furnishings and decor.

==== "Old Towne" concept within the mall ====
Early in the mall's life, Southwyck had a section called "Old Towne." Accessible via a narrow themed walkway from the regular mall, Old Towne was a common area with cobblestone streets and at least 30 smaller retailers, plus some novelty arcade machines.

=== Anchor changes and store closures: 1993-2007 ===
Wards Auto Center located at Southwyck Mall (1972)

In 1993, the mall's owners cited issues with inline vacancy rates, and the property's overall public image. In March 1994, the mall had space for 103 inline tenants, with at least ten being vacant. This was following closures by McDonalds, and other smaller tenants throughout 1992. In 1999, after the purchase of The Lion Store chain, Dillard's announced they would be renaming both Lion Store locations at Southwyck to the Dillard's nameplate. On May 1, 2001, Montgomery Ward shuttered, following a company wide liquidation. The building was subsequently acquired by the mall's owner, Sherman Dreiseszun. Only a month later on June 1, 2001, it was announced that Southwyck Art Cinemas would be closing. The cinema closed on June 10, 2001. In June 2002, Dillard's said in a press release that the Home Store located at Southwyck would close.

==== Westfield Group Acquisition Talks: 2002 ====
In mid 2002, major mall developer, and owner Westfield Group expressed interest in purchasing the 30 year old center, and revitalizing it. Sears and JCPenney also publicly talked with local officials of adding a locations to the mall. Sears would have entered the former Wards space, with JCPenney taking the vacant Dillard's Home pad. Dillard's also stated it would keep its remaining location at the mall if improvements were made. The proposed redevelopment of the mall would've cost $100 million, but never materialized.

On August 31, 2007, Dillard's officially announced plans to close its store at Southwyck. This was after the development and planning of the Dillard's location at the nearby Shops at Fallen Timbers. The chain maintained that no staff would lose their jobs, and that all personnel would simply move to the new location.

=== Closure, demolition, and redevelopment: 2008-2021 ===
The Dillard's Men's, Ladies, and Children's store. (2002)

The mall closed its doors after 36 years of business on June 29, 2008. By November 1, 2009, the Southwyck Mall was completely demolished; the last structure to be demolished was the Montgomery Ward automobile service center.

In 2006, plans were made to demolish Southwyck for an outdoor lifestyle shopping center. These plans also never came to be. In 2021, Amazon Distribution Center DCL5 opened on the plot of land formerly home to Southwyck Mall.
