= Achelous and Hercules =

1947 painting by Thomas Hart Benton

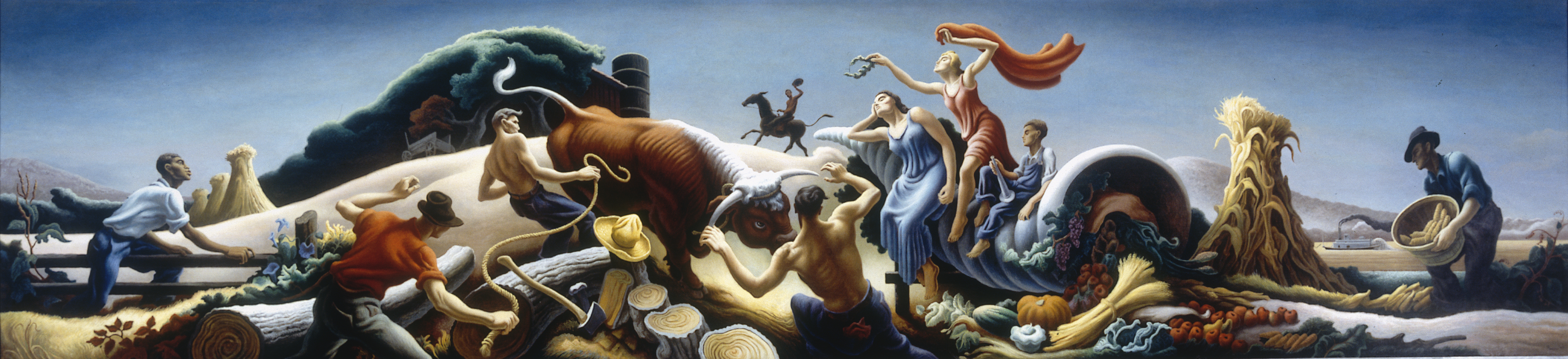
- Artist: Thomas Hart Benton
- Year: 1947
- Medium: Oil and tempera on canvas mounted on plywood
- Dimensions: 62 7/8 by 264 1/8 inches (159.6 by 671 cm)
- Location: Smithsonian American Art Museum
- Accession no.: 1985.2

Achelous and Hercules is a 1947 mural painting by Thomas Hart Benton. It depicts a bluejeans-wearing Hercules wrestling with the horns of a bull, a shape the protean river god Achelous was able to assume. The myth was one of the explanations offered by Greco-Roman mythology for the origin of the cornucopia, a symbol of agricultural abundance. Benton sets the scene during harvest time in the U.S. Midwest.

The mural was formerly displayed at a department store in Kansas City, Missouri, and is now in the collections of the Smithsonian. It was the first of Benton's murals on a river-related theme.

== Description ==
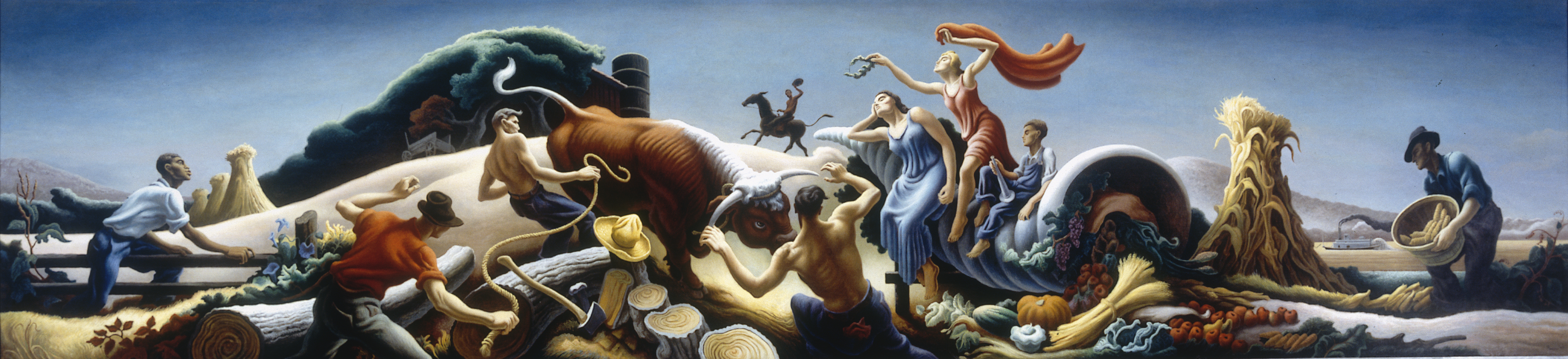
Achelous and Hercules (1947) by Thomas Hart Benton, 22 feet long and more than 5 feet tall

Achelous and Heracles is displayed at the Smithsonian American Art Museum, on the second floor of the north wing. The painting was executed in egg tempera and oil on canvas, and affixed to a plywood panel measuring 62 7/8 by 264 1/8 inches (159.6 by 671 cm). Elizabeth Broun, director of the art museum, has described it as "raucous, gaudy, vibrant ... full of surging shapes and churning rhythms."

The central figure is the muscular, shirtless "Hercules" grappling with the horns of the bull. A second man, also wearing bluejeans and no shirt, stands by the bull's haunch and holds the end of a rope that swirls into another man's hand in the foreground, where the work of woodchopping has been interrupted. The bull's tail points into the surging, wavelike woods that rise out of the distance; a barn and silo emerge from the woods to the right. The undulating line of the rope and tail visually connect the woodlands and the timber produced from it.

The right half of the panel is dominated by a giant bounty-producing cornucopia on which a dark-haired woman reclines, leaning on her elbow with her eyes closed. Above her, a standing blonde with a less voluptuous figure holds aloft a wind-blown piece of red drapery, extending her right hand to offer a laurel wreath in mid-air. This section of the mural brings together two communicative gestures: the presentation of the wreath, and the salutation of a silhouetted mule-mounted rider in the background who raises his hat in greeting or jubilation.

A darker-skinned boy, dressed in overalls, sits next to the women on the cornucopia and holds a white cone. He is mirrored to the far left of the mural by an adult African-American who leans on a split-rail fence and watches the scene, head lifted in poised anticipation. Three sheaves rise up in the landscape behind him. A fourth sheaf appears in the foreground to the right, where a man kneels with a bushel of corn ears, ready to add to the harvest bounty. Finally, a paddle steamer navigates the calm river in the background, another example of how the river is tamed.

== Mythological tradition ==
The subject matter of Achelous and Hercules derives from a telling of the myth in Thomas Bulfinch's Mythology. As a river god, Achelous normally provides "life-giving irrigation", but takes the form of a destructive bull at floodtime:

Hercules' conquest of the river-god was meant to evoke the taking of Missouri waterways by Kansas City pioneers; the horn that Hercules snaps from Achelous' head symbolizes the cornucopia of midwestern agriculture.

Deianira, over whom Hercules and Achelous fought, represents fecundity. She is seated on a proleptic cornucopia—the bull's horn has yet to be severed—from which fruits and vegetables spill. The timber in the foreground provides an important natural resource while clearing the land for farming. The Midwest is envisioned as "abundant and fertile and full of promise".

"The story is thus applicable to our own land," Benton wrote in a pamphlet distributed at the store where the work was first mounted. "It fits our Missouri River, which yet needs the attention of a Hercules."

== Social context ==
Achelous and Hercules was painted for display at Harzfeld's department store in Kansas City. The store specialized in ready-to-wear clothing for women, and Benton later acknowledged that it was strange to see his work "in an atmosphere of silk nighties, pink slips and perfume". It was his first mural commission since his historical murals for the Missouri State Capitol ten years before. In light of controversies over that project, Benton sought reassurance that Harzfeld's corporate president, Lester Siegel, would refrain from trying to exercise artistic control. Siegel in turn asked that Benton observe a certain degree of decorum. After the store closed in 1984, its parent company Allied Stores Corporation made a gift of it to the Smithsonian through the institution's Collections Acquisition Program.

The painting was among several of its time on the theme of "watery disaster", reflecting a concern with flood and water management that was addressed through public works of the Depression and post-Depression era. The economy of Kansas City in the 1940s was largely based on agriculture, which in turn was both dependent on the water supply and vulnerable to flooding from the Missouri and Kaw rivers. The Army Corps of Engineers had begun flood-control efforts on the Missouri when Benton was creating the work, and American agricultural bounty was contributing to the post-war rebuilding of Europe through the Marshall Plan.

The mural was in part Benton's response to criticism from H.W. Janson of the nationalist ideology he perceived in the art of Benton and fellow Regionalist painters. A few weeks before Benton began work, Janson had published the second of two lengthy articles criticizing the Regionalists for "racial and national chauvinism". The mythologizing of Midwestern themes was intended to grant them a universal significance, but for Janson this approach recalled the recasting of Greek myths in contemporary settings under Nazi Germany.

== Aesthetic considerations ==
Achelous and Hercules also served as Benton's assertion of the figurative mode in contrast to the abstract expressionism of his former student Jackson Pollock. The critical reception of this effort was not always positive: "More often than not, ... Benton's mythic visions of the Midwest looked more lewd or awkward than eternally noble. Achelous and Hercules is unnaturally stylized, as Midwestern maids take balletic leaps through the air and farmers pose like toreadors in a bullring."
