= Oppenstein Brothers Memorial Park =

Urban park in Kansas City, Missouri, US

Coordinates: 39°06′01″N 94°34′55″W

Oppenstein Brothers Memorial Park is an urban park located in the heart of Kansas City, Missouri's, Central business district, located at the northeast corner of 12th and Walnut Streets. Some notable buildings in the surrounding area are One Kansas City Place, Town Pavilion, and the 1010 Grand Building. The park is often visited by businesspeople of the many surrounding buildings on lunch and coffee breaks.

Oppenstein Brothers Memorial Park was dedicated in 1981 and is named for the Oppenstein Brothers, who operated a retail jewelry business in Kansas City and were active in the community, and who are the namesakes of the Oppenstein Brothers Foundation, a Kansas City charitable organization established in 1975. The park was formerly the home to the Rain Thicket Fountain by William Conrad Severson and Saunders Schultz. Also dedicated in 1981, this was an abstract sculpture in a stylized tree-like form with wind-moved limbs which shot, dripped, and bubbled water, creating mists and rainbows.

The park was redesigned and rebuilt in 2006-2008, with a rededication on April 18, 2008. This project was commissioned by the Art in the Loop Foundation, with design by Kansas City artist Laura DeAngelis and architect Dominique Davison. The new concept was named "Celestial Flyways" and was intended to celebrate the natural environment of the Kansas City area.

The centerpiece of the new design is an interactive anaphoric star disc, an astronomical machine based on the anaphoric clock of antiquity. It is probably the largest and most accurate anaphoric star disc ever made. Park visitors can rotate the star disk to a display the stars for a given date and time with a motor operated by buttons on the base.
