= Forsyth, Illinois =

Village in Macon County, Illinois

- Village
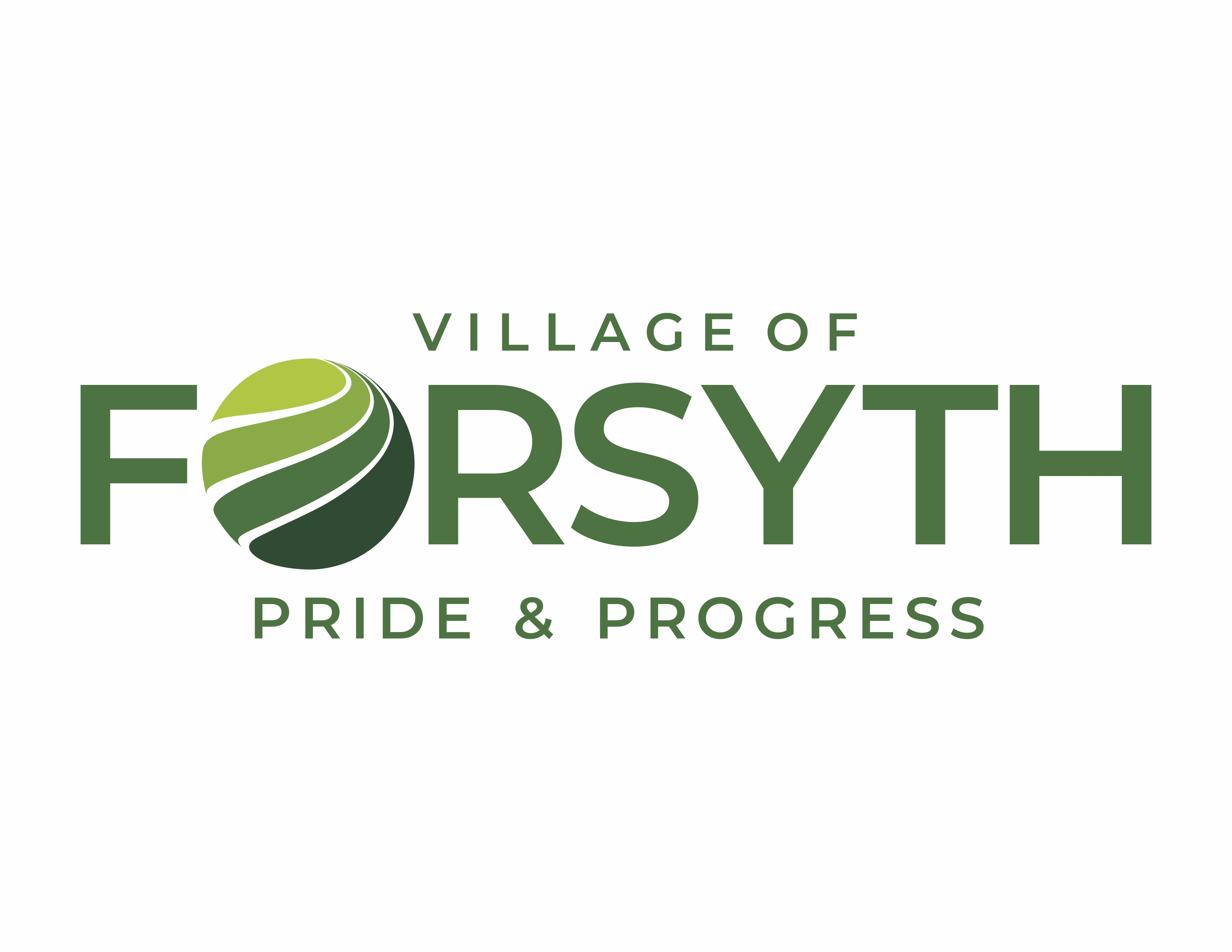
- Official logo
- Motto(s): "Pride and progress"
- Location in Macon County, Illinois
- Coordinates: 39°53′33″N 88°57′51″W
- Country: United States
- State: Illinois
- County: Macon
- Township: Hickory Point

Government
  - Type: Trustee-President
  - Village President: Jim Peck

Area
  - Total: 3.13 sq mi (8.11 km^{2})
  - Land: 3.13 sq mi (8.11 km^{2})
  - Water: 0 sq mi (0.00 km^{2})
- Elevation: 659 ft (201 m)

Population (2020)
  - Total: 3,734
  - Density: 1,192.9/sq mi (460.57/km^{2})
- Time zone: UTC-6 (CST)
  - Summer (DST): UTC-5 (CDT)
- ZIP code: 62535
- Area code(s): 217, 447
- FIPS code: 17-27091
- GNIS feature ID: 2398901
- Website: www.forsyth-il.gov

Forsyth is a village in Macon County, Illinois, United States. Its population was 3,734 at the 2020 census, up from 3,490 in 2010. It is included in the Decatur, Illinois Metropolitan Statistical Area.

== History ==
The village was established around 1854 with the arrival of the Illinois Central Railroad in Macon County. The village is named in honor of Colonel Robert Forsyth, the first general freight agent for the Illinois Central Railroad.

== Geography ==
Forsyth is located in north-central Macon County. It is bordered to the south by the city of Decatur, the county seat. U.S. Route 51 is the main highway through the village, leading south 6 miles (10 km) to the center of Decatur and north 15 miles (24 km) to Clinton. Interstate 72 runs along the southern border of Forsyth, with access from Exit 141 (US 51). I-72 leads northeast 43 miles (69 km) to Champaign and west 42 miles (68 km) to Springfield, the state capital.

According to the 2021 census gazetteer files, Forsyth has a total area of 3.13 square miles (8.11 km^{2}), all land.

== Demographics ==
Historical population
Census	Pop.	Note	%±
1880	152		—
1960	424		—
1970	585		38.0%
1980	1,029		75.9%
1990	1,275		23.9%
2000	2,434		90.9%
2010	3,490		43.4%
2020	3,734		7.0%
U.S. Decennial Census

As of the 2020 census there were 3,734 people, 1,291 households, and 963 families residing in the village. The population density was 1,192.97 inhabitants per square mile (460.61/km^{2}). The racial makeup of the village was 81.60% White, 2.17% African American, 0.13% Native American, 10.93% Asian, 0.00% Pacific Islander, 0.78% from other races, and 4.39% from two or more races. Hispanic or Latino of any race were 2.28% of the population.

There were 1,291 households, out of which 35.2% had children under the age of 18 living with them, 71.80% were married couples living together, 2.09% had a female householder with no husband present, and 25.41% were non-families. 24.94% of all households were made up of individuals, and 16.11% had someone living alone who was 65 years of age or older. The average household size was 3.21 and the average family size was 2.68.

The village's age distribution consisted of 30.0% under the age of 18, 5.0% from 18 to 24, 23.7% from 25 to 44, 23.3% from 45 to 64, and 17.9% who were 65 years of age or older. The median age was 41.2 years. For every 100 females, there were 101.2 males. For every 100 females age 18 and over, there were 95.1 males.

The median income for a household in the village was $95,865, and the median income for a family was $126,571. Males had a median income of $77,467 versus $60,139 for females. The per capita income for the village was $48,050. About 6.3% of families and 9.1% of the population were below the poverty line, including 16.1% of those under age 18 and 2.6% of those age 65 or over.

There were 1,448 housing units, of which 4.6% were vacant. The homeowner vacancy rate was 1.9% and the rental vacancy rate was 6.1%.

Racial composition as of the 2020 census
Race	Number	Percent
White	3,047	81.6%
Black or African American	81	2.2%
American Indian and Alaska Native	5	0.1%
Asian	408	10.9%
Native Hawaiian and Other Pacific Islander	0	0.0%
Some other race	29	0.8%
Two or more races	164	4.4%
Hispanic or Latino (of any race)	85	2.3%

== Education ==
K–12 public education in the municipality Forsyth is provided by two school districts: Most of Forsyth is in the Maroa-Forsyth Community Unit School District 2, while parts of western Forsyth are in the Warrensburg-Latham Community Unit School District 11.

Maroa-Forsyth CUSD 2 schools include:

- Maroa-Forsyth Grade School
- Maroa-Forsyth Middle School
- Maroa-Forsyth High School

== Village logo ==
At the start of 2019, the Village Board of Trustees voted to approve a new village logo. The previous logo had not been updated since the 1980s. The new logo puts an emphasis on the village's slogan, "Pride and Progress", while still maintaining the iconic green color that is so familiar to the community.

== Economy ==
The Hickory Point Mall is located in Forsyth. Therefore, the village of Forsyth's retail base is made up of several big box and many smaller retail stores.

== Transportation ==
Decatur Public Transit System provides bus service on Route 51 connecting Forsyth to downtown Decatur and other destinations.

== Notable person ==
- Kevin Koslofski, outfielder for the Kansas City Royals (1992–1994) and Milwaukee Brewers (1996); graduate of Maroa-Forsyth High School
