= Town Center Plaza =

Shopping center in Leawood, Kansas

Coordinates: 38°54′49″N 94°38′27″W

Town Center Plaza is an open-air shopping center in Leawood, Kansas, United States. It is home to a number of upscale stores with few or no other locations in the Kansas City area, including Allen Edmonds, Arhaus, Brooks Brothers, Bonobos, Crate & Barrel, L.L. Bean, Peloton, Purple Mattress, a Restoration Hardware Gallery store, and Sundance.

It opened in 1996 with Jacobson's as the main anchor store. After Jacobson's closed in 2002, it was converted to The Jones Store in 2003 and Macy's in 2006. Another original tenant was Galyan's, which became Dick's Sporting Goods in 2004.

It and nearby Town Center Crossing (formerly One Nineteen) are owned by Washington Prime Group, formerly WP Glimcher and before that, Glimcher Realty Trust, who bought Town Center Plaza from DDR Corp. for $139 million.
