= Copaken Brooks =

US commercial real estate developer

- Company type: Private
- Industry: Real estate
- Founded: 1922; 104 years ago
- Founder: Herman Copaken
- Headquarters: Kansas City, Missouri
- Key people: Jon Copaken, Principal; Keith Copaken, Principal; Bucky Brooks, Principal; William Crandall, Principal
- Website: www.copaken-brooks.com

Copaken Brooks, formerly Copaken, White & Blitt is a privately owned full-service commercial real estate developer headquartered in Kansas City, Missouri, that has developed, leased, managed and owned many of the significant "signature properties" in Kansas City, as well as other cities across the US. Today, they maintain a nationwide client base, providing expert representation and advisory services for tenants, landlords, corporations, investors and developers throughout the United States. Services include: Corporate Services Advising, Tenant Representation Advising, Brokerage Advising, Investment Acquisition, Land Acquisition, Development, Owner's Representation, Build-To-Suit, Leasing (Office, Retail, Industrial, Medical Office, Underground), Property Management, Facilities Management, Asset Management, Multi-Family Management and Leasing, and Investment Sales.

== History ==
The firm, originally known as Copaken Realtors, was founded by Herman Copaken in 1922.

In 1965, the company changed its name to Copaken White & Blitt when the brothers-in-law, Paul Copaken, Lewis White, and Irwin Blitt, took over running the company.

In the 1960s and 1970s the company developed several shopping centers including Mission Center Mall, Oak Park Mall as well as the Eastland Mall in Bloomington, Illinois, Hickory Point Mall in Forsyth, Illinois, and Rockaway Townsquare in Rockaway, New Jersey.

The company also sold the property to Sprint and Black & Veatch Corporation to build their corporate headquarters in Overland Park, Kansas. In 2008, it developed the headquarters for Applebee's.

In 2010, Copaken White & Blitt merged with First Scout Realty Advisors.

In March 2022, the company celebrated 100 years of business.

In 2023, the company merged with CBC Real Estate Group, which it has been partnering with since 2022.

== Awards and recognition ==
In 2013, the company won the Greater Kansas City Chamber of Commerce "Mr. K" Small Business of the Year award.

In July 2023, Ingram's magazine awarded Copaken Brooks a silver medal in the “Best Commercial Real Estate Firm” category.

== Properties ==
- Town Pavilion
- 1201 Walnut
- Plaza Colonnade
- Corrigan Station I & II
- ARTerra
- Midwest Gateway Industrial
- City Center Lenexa
- Renaissance Office Park (College & Metcalf)
- Market Square Center
- Creekwood Commons
- Western Auto Building
