= Oak Park Mall =

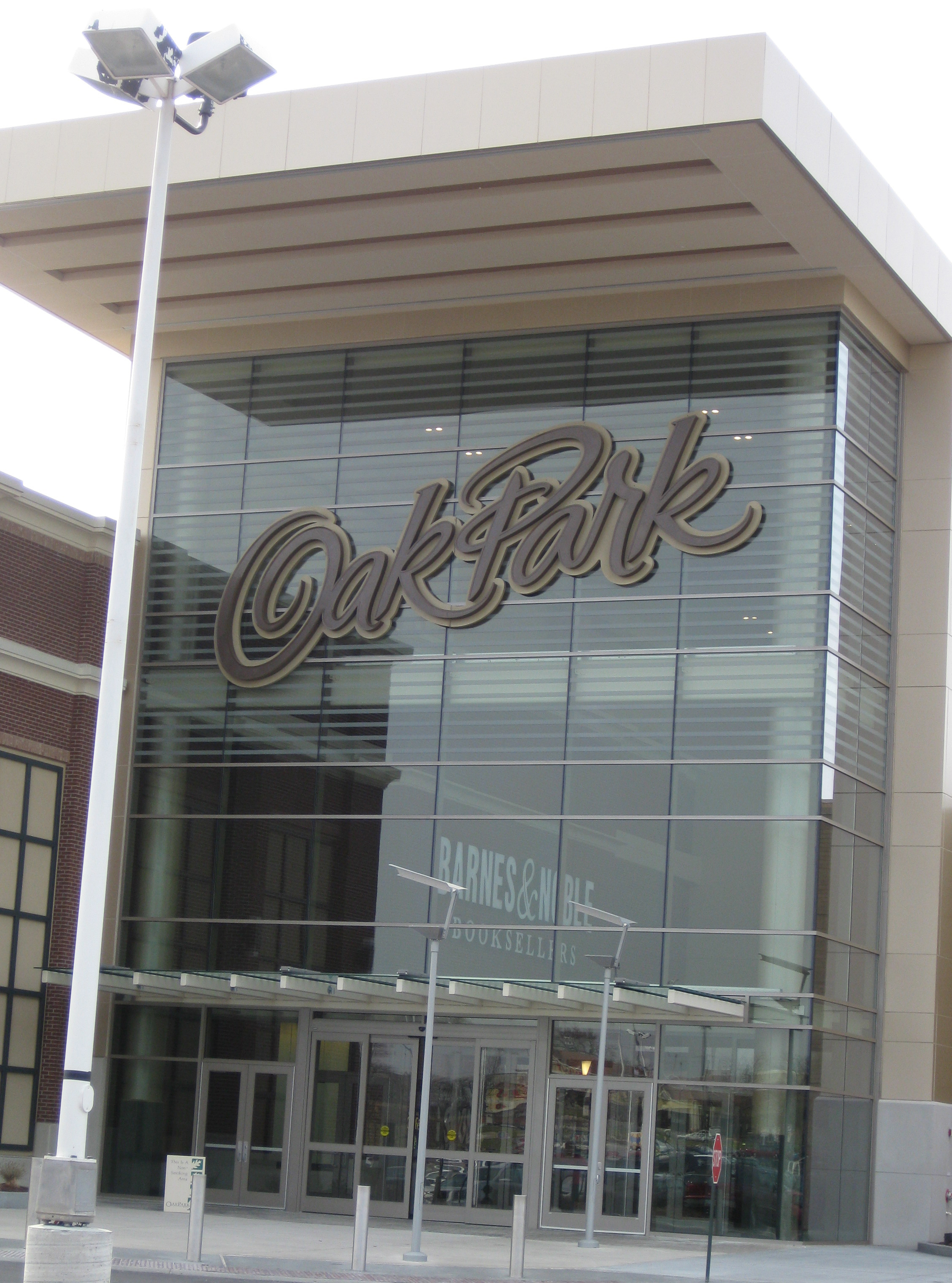
- Location: Overland Park, Kansas, United States
- Coordinates: 38.953485°N 94.719476°W
- Address: 11149 West 95th Street
- Opened: August 28, 1975
- Developer: Copaken White & Blitt
- Manager: CBL & Associates
- Owner: CBL & Associates (50%); TIAA-CREF (50%)
- Num. of stores: 180+
- Num. of anchor tenants: 5
- Floor area: 1,607,803 sq ft (149,369.8 m^{2})
- Floors: 2 (3 in Nordstrom)
- Parking: Parking lot
- Public transit: RideKC
- Website: shopoakparkmall.com

Oak Park Mall is a super-regional shopping mall located in Overland Park, Kansas, containing over 180 stores in a covered area of 1,607,803 sq ft (149,369.8 m^{2}). It is the largest mall in the Kansas City Metro Area as well as the entire state of Kansas, and is split into two levels and contains five department stores. It was developed by Copaken, White & Blitt in conjunction with Frank Morgan and Sherman Dreiseszun. The mall is anchored by two Dillard's locations, Macy's, Nordstrom, JCPenney, Barnes & Noble, and H&M.

== Ownership ==
In May 2011, it was announced that TIAA-CREF would receive 50% ownership of Oak Park Mall and several other CBL malls in an attempt to reduce CBL's debt.

== History ==
The mall opened in 1975 with original anchors JCPenney, Macy's, Montgomery Ward and Stix, Baer & Fuller.

A 1982 CBS News special report titled "The Mall" was filmed entirely in the Oak Park Mall. The report detailed the rise of malls in the United States. In 1984, Stix, Baer & Fuller rebranded as the mall's first Dillard's store, only to add another Dillard's store which replaced Macy's in 1985 when the chain sold off its Midwest locations.

The mall received extensive renovations in 1993 and was expanded in 1997. A 2-level Southeast Wing was also added, which was anchored by a 3-level (200,000 square foot) Nordstrom, which opened on March 6, 1998.

Montgomery Ward closed in March 2001. After renovations, The Jones Store opened in its place on August 14, 2002. Following the assumption of The Jones Store Co. by Macy's Inc., The Jones Store name was retired, and on September 9, 2006 Macy's returned to Oak Park Mall after a 20-year hiatus.

Target opened for the first time south of the mall in 2005.

The mall received another extensive renovation in 2011, including altering the food court dining area and new entrance vestibules. In June 2012, the area's first Microsoft Store opened at the mall in the former Talbots space. Due to the COVID-19 pandemic, all Microsoft Store locations closed in late March, 2020. In June, 2020 Microsoft permanently closed all physical Microsoft Store locations.

In the center of the mall, near Dillard's North, is a double-decker carousel. The carousel was originally located in the atrium nearest Dillard's South. In the early 2000s, the carousel was removed and the area was remodeled to a woodland theme with a regular carousel appearing alongside a miniature ride-on train. In 2009, the double-decker carousel returned, relocated to the other main atrium. In 2023 the carousel was removed again. The mall used to be home to the Kansas City Metro's only Rainforest Cafe, which opened in 1999. The addition of the Rainforest Cafe necessitated a small expansion to the north of the existing mall to house most of the restaurant. Rainforest Cafe remained at the mall for a decade and decided not to renew their lease. The former space was then divided into three spaces with the American Girl store taking up much of the former restaurant's area.

On February 2, 2018, Nordstrom originally announced plans to move to the Country Club Plaza, but as of April 2022, it was reported that Nordstrom was no longer considering opening a store at Country Club Plaza and instead would be staying at Oak Park Mall.

In July 2020, the American Girl store closed permanently.

On November 12, 2023, a shooting occurred in the mall's food court after a shoplifting suspect got ahold of an undercover police officer's firearm. One shot was fired and no injuries were reported. This occurred less than a week after a shooting at the Independence Center Mall, the other major enclosed shopping mall in the Kansas City metro.

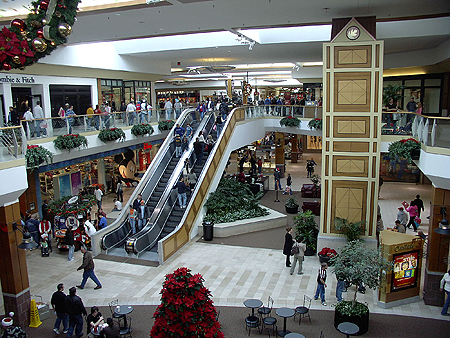
Oak Park Mall, during the holiday season.
