= Blue Ridge Crossing =

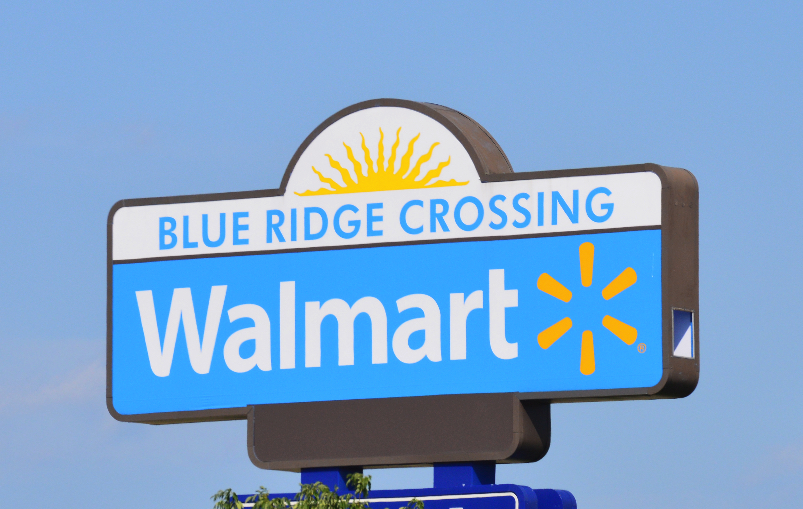
- Location: Kansas City, Missouri
- Coordinates: 39.0455°N 94.4447°W
- Opened: 1958 (As Blue Ridge Mall); January 2007
- Closed: C. 2004 (As Blue Ridge Mall)
- Developer: IAS Partners, Ltd.
- Owner: MBS Mall Investor-98, LLC
- Architect: Piper-Wind Architects, Inc.
- Num. of anchor tenants: 1
- Floors: 1
- Public transit: Inde*Bus
- Website: blueridgecrossing.com

Blue Ridge Crossing is a shopping center located near Interstate 70 (I-70) and Blue Ridge Boulevard in Kansas City, Missouri with additional parcels along U.S. I-40 in neighboring Independence, Missouri. It occupies the site of the former Blue Ridge Mall.

== History ==
The mall opened in October 17, 1958, as an open-air regional shopping center and was the vision of William Reich. It included a location of Harzfeld's. H. Roe Bartle, the Mayor of Kansas City, cut the ribbon that officially opened the shopping center.

Grand opening events lasted over a year, drawing celebrities of the day including Eva Gabor and Sandra Dee. Upon opening, the mall offered concierge services and childcare in the lower level. These amenities were largely unheard of at the time.

Blue Ridge Mall had the added distinction of being located in two cities at the same time. The city limits of Kansas City, Missouri and Independence, Missouri bisected The Jones Store Co. on the northeast corner of the store.

During the 1960s, Blue Ridge Mall was the most popular shopping center in the Kansas City Metropolitan area and in 1971, the JCPenney store expanded moving from the south court of the mall to become an anchor store on the west end. With that move, the shopping center was fully enclosed and the hey-day of the Blue Ridge Mall would continue for two more decades.

By the mid-1990s, the Kansas City Metropolitan Area had a 'mall glut' and with two newer enclosed malls within a 10-mile radius, Blue Ridge Mall started to show its age. After several ownership changes, including a failed attempt at redevelopment when Montgomery Ward suddenly announced its bankruptcy and the closure of all stores nationwide at the close of 2000, the ownership decided to demolish the old mall and start again.

In 2001, JCPenney closed its store at the mall, leaving The Jones Store as the sole anchor. The Jones Store shuttered in 2003, leaving the mall with no anchors.

Tax Increment Financing was obtained from the City of Kansas City and demolition for Phase I began in late 2005 and continued into early 2006. The redevelopment was led by IAS Partners, Ltd., a Kansas City-based real estate development firm, with Patrick Hayes serving as president and David Horn as project manager.

Blue Ridge Crossing opened in January 2007, with the full Phase I development completed in 2008, anchored by a Walmart Supercenter. Other opening tenants included McDonald's, Applebee's, Starbucks, Johnny Carino's Italian, Verizon Wireless, Vintage Stock, and Foxy Nails.

Phase II 18 acres (73,000 m^{2}), consisting of 18 acres West of Sterling Avenue, was announced for construction beginning in late 2012. No construction on Phase II had been reported as of 2026, and the development's leasing page continued to solicit anchor and in-line tenants for the parcel.

Phase III 8 acres (32,000 m^{2}), consisting of 8 acres East of Blue Ridge Boulevard on the former site of the Blue Ridge Cinema East in Independence, Missouri, also has not advanced to construction.
