= Freedom Square =

Freedom Square may refer to:

== Squares ==
- Freedom Square, Sukhumi, Republic of Abkhazia / Autonomous Republic of Abkhazia (Georgia) (Площадь Свободы)
- Freedom Square, Yerevan, Armenia (Ազատության հրապարակ)
- Freedom Square, Baku, Azerbaijan (Azadlıq meydanı)
- Freedom Square, Belo Horizonte, Brazil (Praça da Liberdade)
- Freedom Square, Nicosia, Cyprus (Πλατεία Ελευθερίας)
- Freedom Square, Brno, Czechia (Náměstí Svobody)
- Freedom Square, Tallinn, Estonia (Vabaduse väljak)
- Freedom Square, Batumi, Georgia (თავისუფლების მოედანი)
- Freedom Square, Tbilisi, Georgia (თავისუფლების მოედანი)
- Freedom Square, Heraklion, Greece (Πλατεία Ελευθερίας)
- Freedom Square, Kos, Greece (Πλατεία Ελευθερίας)
- Freedom Square, Budapest, Hungary (Szabadság Tér)
- Azadi Square, also known as Freedom Square, Tehran, Iran (میدان آزادی)
- Davidka Square, officially Freedom Square, Jerusalem, Israel (Kikar HaDavidka, officially Kikar Haherut)
- Freedom Square, Valletta, Malta (Misraħ il-Ħelsien)
- Freedom Square, Nikšić, Montenegro (Трг Слободе)
- Freedom Square in Bydgoszcz, Poland (Plac Wolności w Bydgoszczy)
- Liberty Square in Łódź, Poland, also known as Freedom Square (Plac Wolności w Łodzi)
- Freedom Square, former name of the Crossroads Square in Warsaw, Poland
- Freedom Square (formerly "Gottwald Square"), Bratislava, Slovakia (Námestie Slobody)
- Freedom Square (formerly "Dzerzhinsky Square"), Kharkiv, Ukraine (Площа Свободи)
- Freedom Square, Kew Gardens Hills, New York, USA

== Other meanings ==
- Freedom Square (political party) - political party in Georgia (country).

== See also ==
- Liberty Square (disambiguation)
- Tahrir Square (disambiguation)
- Freedom Monument (disambiguation)
- Merdeka Square (disambiguation)
- Independence Square (disambiguation)
