= Independence Square =

Independence Square may refer to:

- Independence Square, Gyumri, Armenia
- Independence Square, at Pabna University of Science & Technology, Bangladesh
- Independence Square, Minsk, Belarus
- Independence Square, Sofia, Bulgaria
- Plaza de la Independencia, Quito, Ecuador
- Black Star Square, also called Independence Square, Accra, Ghana
- Merdeka Square, Jakarta, Indonesia
- Independence Square, Nur-Sultan, Astana, Kazakhstan
- Independence Square, Vilnius, Lithuania
- Merdeka Square, Kuala Lumpur, Malaysia
- Putrajaya Independence Square, Malaysia
- Independence Square outside St Paul's Pro-Cathedral, Valletta, Malta
- Independence Square in Choibalsan, Mongolia
- Independence Square (Podgorica), Montenegro
- Praça da Independência, Maputo, Mozambique
- Tinubu Square, Lagos Island, Lagos State, Nigeria
- Independence Square (Basseterre), Saint Kitts and Nevis
- Independence Square, Chachapoyas, Peru
- Independence Square (Charlotte), North Carolina, United States
- Independence Square, Colombo, Sri Lanka
- Onafhankelijkheidsplein, Paramaribo, Suriname
- Independence Square (Port of Spain), Trinidad and Tobago
- Independence Square, Ashgabat, Turkmenistan
- Independence Square, Kyiv, Ukraine
- Independence Square, Washington, District of Columbia, United States; a complex containing Two Independence Square
- Independence Square, Independence Hall in Philadelphia, Pennsylvania, United States
- Independence Square, Independence, Missouri, United States
- Plaza Independencia, Montevideo, Uruguay
- Independence Square (Tashkent), Uzbekistan

== See also ==
- Arcade Independence Square, a shopping complex in Colombo, Sri Lanka
- Martyrs' Square (disambiguation)
- Merdeka Square (disambiguation)
- Freedom Square (disambiguation)
- Independence (disambiguation)
- Independence Hall (disambiguation)
- Independence Plaza (disambiguation)
- Two Independence Square, NASA Headquarters in Washington D.C.
