= Martyr (disambiguation) =

A martyr is a person who is put to death or endures suffering because of a belief, principle, or cause. Martyr or martyrs may also refer to:

== Films ==
- Martyr (1927 film), a French silent film
- Martyr (2017 film), a Lebanese film by Mazen Khaled
- Martyrs (2008 film), a French horror film
- Martyrs (2015 film), an American remake of the French film

== Music ==
- Martyr (band), a French Canadian metal band
- The Martyr (album), a 2011 Immortal Technique album

=== Songs ===
- "Martyr" (song), a song by Depeche Mode
- "Martyr", a song by August Burns Red from Found in Far Away Places
- "Martyr", a song by Fear Factory from Soul of a New Machine
- "Martyr", a song by Morning Again from As Tradition Dies Slowly
- "Martyr", a song by Polaris from The Death of Me
- "Martyr", a song by Soilwork from Sworn to a Great Divide
- "Martyrs", a song by Betraying the Martyrs from Breathe in Life
- "Martyrs", a song by The Devil Wears Prada from 8:18
- "Martyrs", a song by Veil of Maya from Id
- "Martyrs", a psalm tune from the Scottish Psalter, also a set of organ variations on the tune by Kenneth Leighton
- "The Martyr", a song by Andy Black from The Ghost of Ohio
- "The Martyr", a song by Blind Guardian from Battalions of Fear
- "The Martyr", a song by Cursive from Domestica
- "The Martyr", a song by Living Sacrifice from Conceived in Fire
- "The Martyr", a song by the band Wally from Wally
- "The Martyr", a song by Senses Fail only released as downloadable content for Guitar Hero World Tour

== Other uses ==
- Martyr (politics)
- Martyr (surname)
- "The Martyr" (Herman Melville poem), on the assassination of Abraham Lincoln
- The Martyr (sculpture), by Rodin
- Matt Bentley, also known as Martyr, American professional wrestler
- Martyr (beetle), a genus of beetles in the family Carabidae
- Martyrs Bus Service, a bus and coach operator in Melbourne, Victoria, Australia
- Seoul FC Martyrs, a South Korean football team
- Martyr!, a 2024 novel by Kaveh Akbar

== See also ==
- Christian martyr
- Military saint
- Martyrs' Day
- Martyrs' Square (disambiguation)
- Martyre (disambiguation)
