= Merdeka Square =

Merdeka Square may refer to:

- Merdeka Square, Jakarta, Indonesia
- Merdeka Square, Kuala Lumpur, Malaysia
- Merdeka Square, Kota Kinabalu, Malaysia

== See also ==
- Freedom Square (disambiguation)
- Independence Square (disambiguation)
- Merdeka Palace, Jakarta, Indonesia
- Istiqlal Mosque (disambiguation)
