= Liberty Square =

Liberty Square may refer to:

== City squares ==
Alphabetical by city

- Liberty Square, Aleppo, Syria
- Praça da Liberdade, Belo Horizonte, Brazil
- Liberty Square (Budapest), Hungary
- Plaza Libertad, Iloilo City, Philippines
- Liberty Square, Łódź, Poland
- Liberty Square, Nikšić, or Freedom Square, Montenegro
- Liberdade Square (Porto), Portugal
- Liberty Square (Taipei), Taiwan
- Liberty Square, Timișoara, Romania
- Liberty Square (Tolyatti), Russia

== Other uses ==
- Liberty Square, Baltimore, Maryland, U.S., a neighborhood
- Liberty Square (Miami), Florida, U.S., a public housing project
- Liberty Square (Magic Kingdom), an area of the Magic Kingdom theme park at Walt Disney World Resort, Bay Lake, Florida, U.S.
- Liberty Square, a 2005 album by Udora

== See also ==
- Azadi Square, Tehran, Iran
- Freedom Square (disambiguation)
- Zuccotti Park, Manhattan, New York City, informally renamed "Liberty Square" during the Occupy Wall Street protests
