= Liberation Square =

Liberation Square may refer to:

- Liberation Square, Baghdad in Iraq
- Liberation Square, a square in Saint Helier, Channel Islands
- Congress Square in Ljubljana, Slovenia, formerly (1974–1991) known as Liberation Square
- Liberation Square (Felszabadulás tér), former name of Ferenciek tere (Budapest Metro)

== See also ==
- Tahrir Square (disambiguation) (Arabic for Liberation Square)
