= Martyre (disambiguation) =

Martyre is a music album released in 2000 by the band Saturnus.

Martyre (disambiguation) may also refer to:

- La Martyre, a commune in the Finistère department of Brittany, France

== See also ==
- Martyr (disambiguation)
