= Martyr (surname) =

Martyr is a surname. Notable people with this surname include:

- Grace Ethel Martyr (1888–1934), Australian poet, short story writer and journalist
- John Martyr (1932–2021), Australian politician
- Weston Martyr (1885–1966), pioneer British ocean yachtsman, writer and broadcaster

Notable people with Martyr as a middle name include:

- Nancy Martyr Bolton, Australian artist

== See also ==
- Martyr (disambiguation)
