= Istiqlal Mosque =

Istiqlal Mosque may refer to:

- Istiqlal Mosque in Jakarta, Indonesia
- Istiklal Mosque, Sarajevo in Otoka, Sarajevo, Bosnia and Herzegovina
