= Independence Square, Vilnius =

Urban square in Vilnius, Lithuania

Coordinates: 54°41′26″N 25°15′42″E

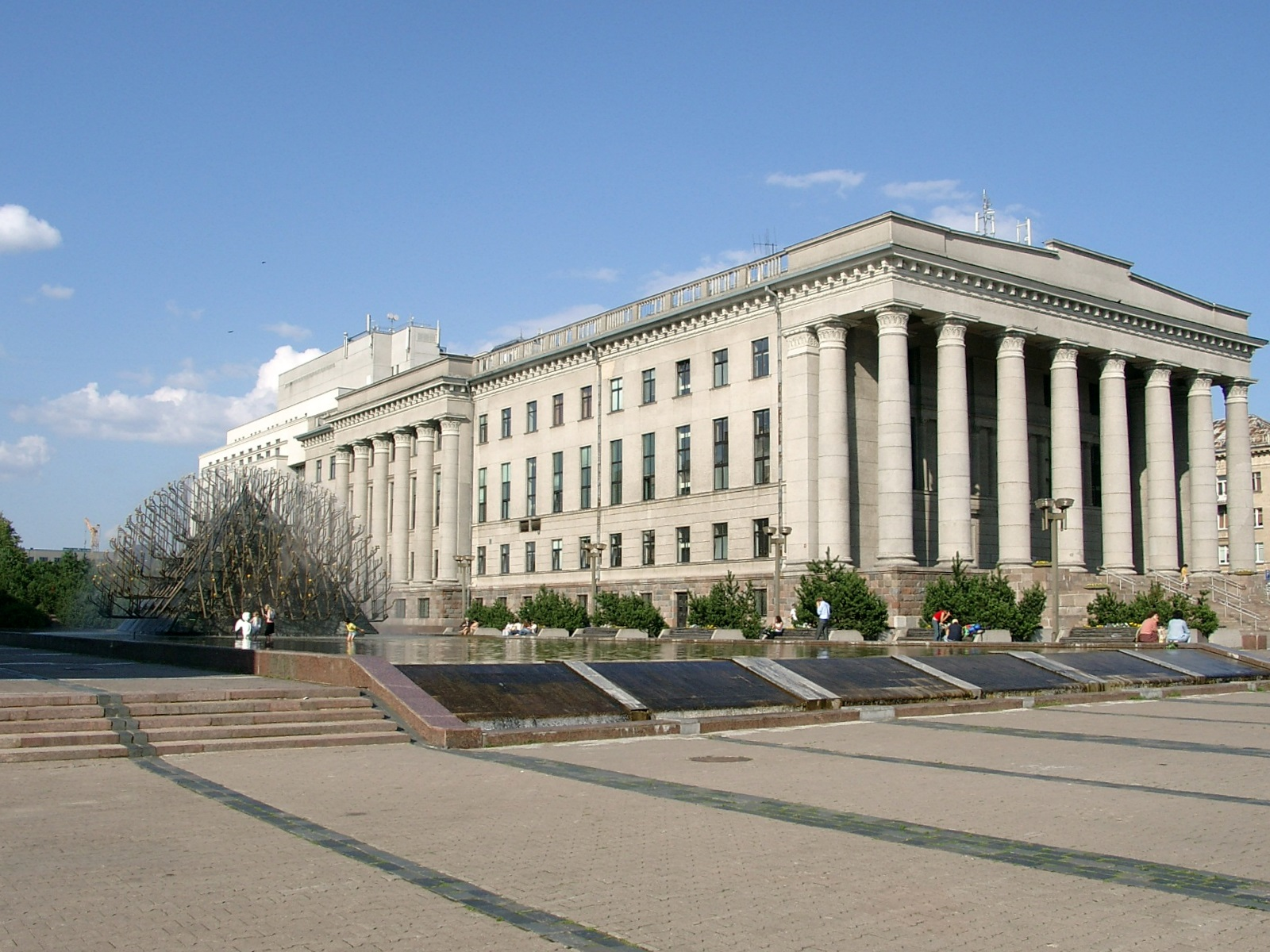
Fountain in the Independence Square in front of the Martynas Mažvydas National Library of Lithuania

Independence Square (Lithuanian: Nepriklausomybės aikštė) is a square in the Naujamiestis district of Vilnius, Lithuania. The square is surrounded by the Seimas Palace, Office of the Seimas, Martynas Mažvydas National Library of Lithuania. The square was originally constructed in 1981–1985, its architect is Algimantas Nasvytis. Currently, the square is named in honor of the Re-Establishment of the State of Lithuania on 11 March 1990 and the independence commemoration ceremonies annually takes place there.
