= Freedom Square, Bydgoszcz =

Square in Bydgoszcz, Poland

Coordinates: 53°07′36″N 18°00′21″E

Freedom Square
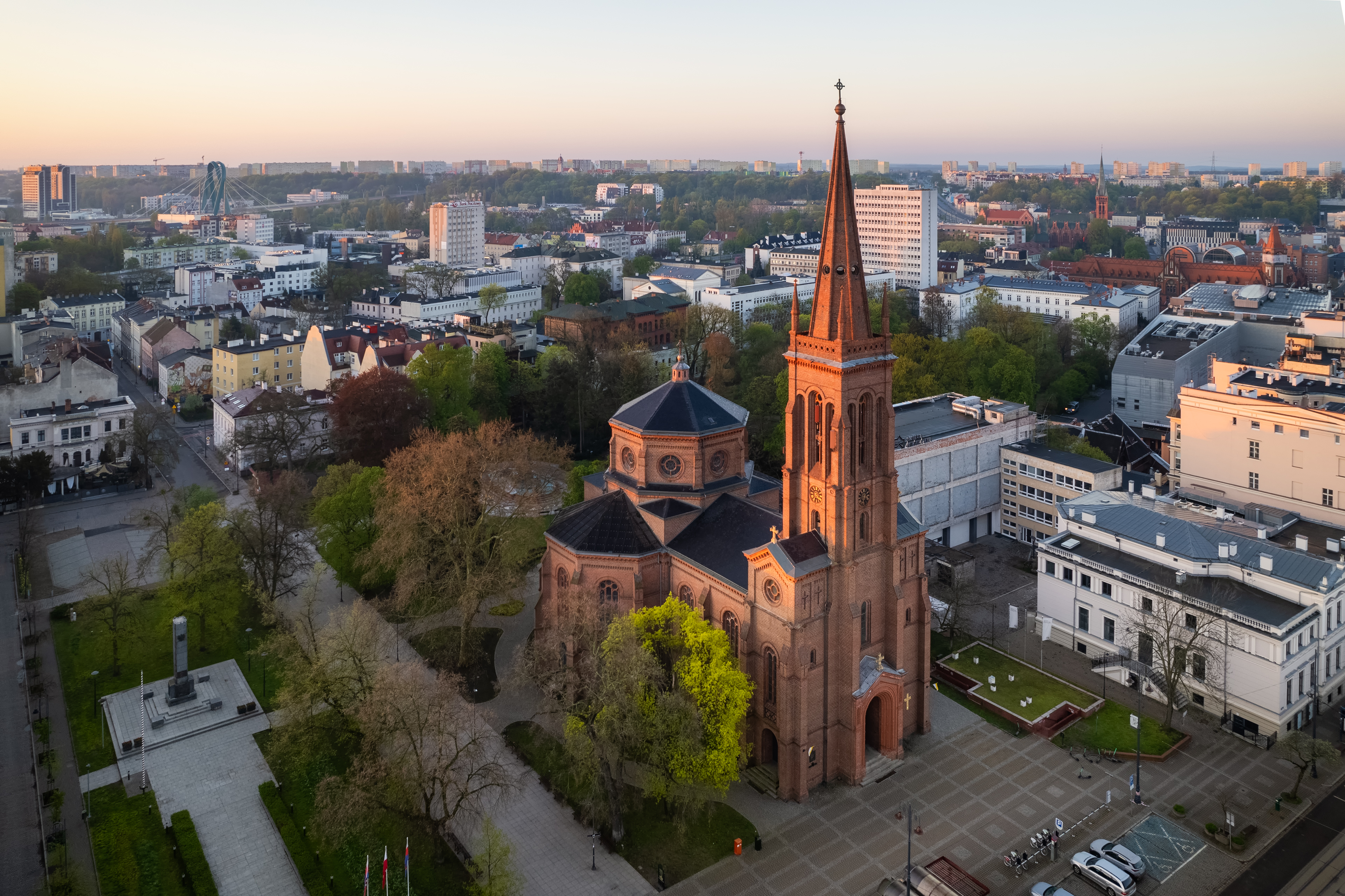
- Bird eye view of Freedom Square Bydgoszcz

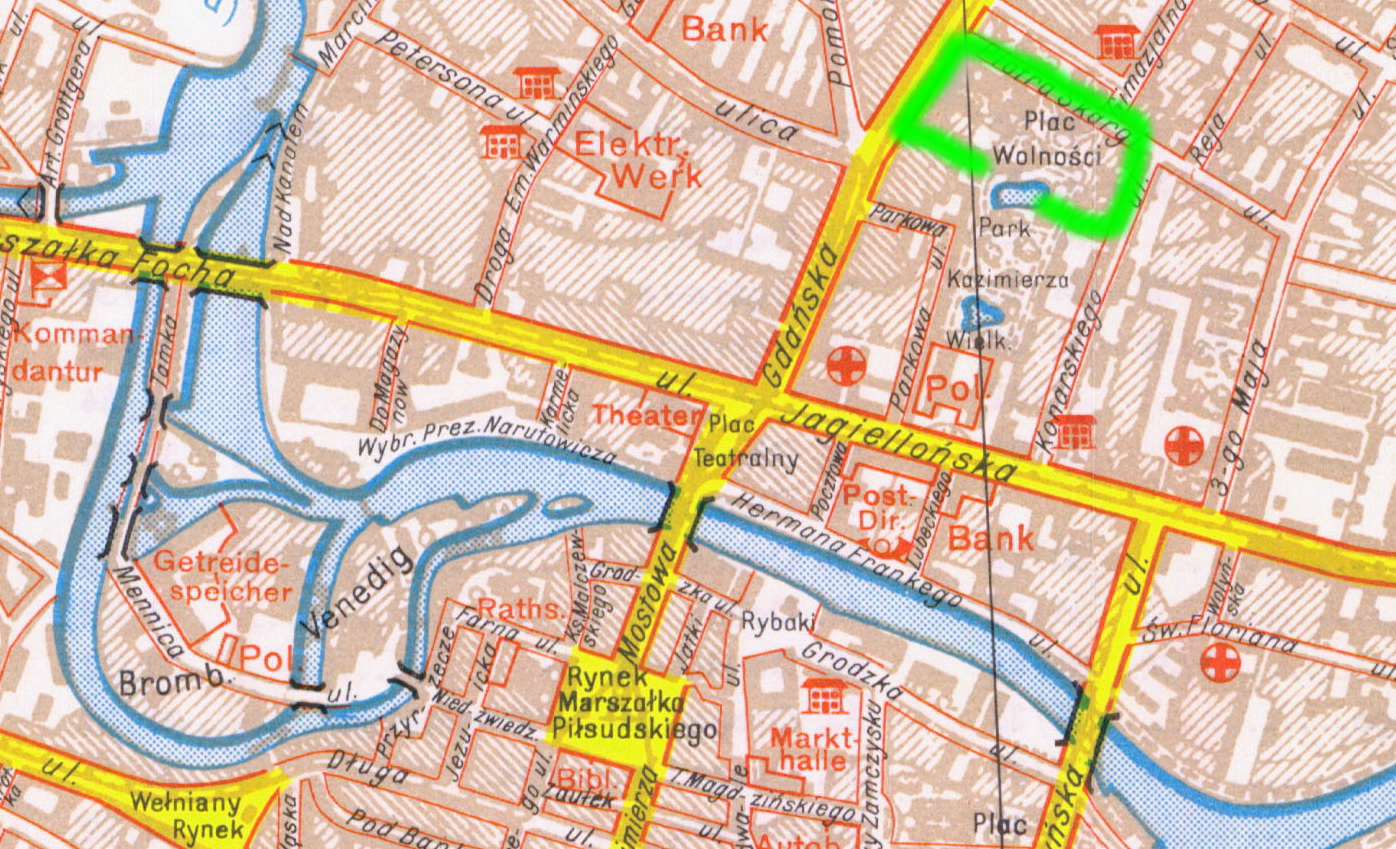
- Location of Freedom Square on a 1939 map
- Native name: Plac Wolności (Polish)
- Former names: Weltzien Platz (till 1920 & 1939–1945) – Plac Wolnosci (1920–1939) & after 1945
- Location: Bydgoszcz, Poland

Freedom Square in Bydgoszcz (Polish: Plac Wolności) is located in Bydgoszcz, Poland, in downtown area, between Gdańska Street and the park Casimir the Great.

== Characteristics and Location ==
Freedom Square is located in the Downtown district (Polish: Śródmieście) of Bydgoszcz, ornamented by Art Nouveau buildings, a historical church, a memorial and a green park. It is a location for recreational activities as well as military and official ceremonies.

The square is centrally located: on its western edge runs the Gdańska Street, heart of downtown Bydgoszcz. On its south border is the Casimir the Great Park, and to the east starts north the Gimnazjalna street.

== History ==
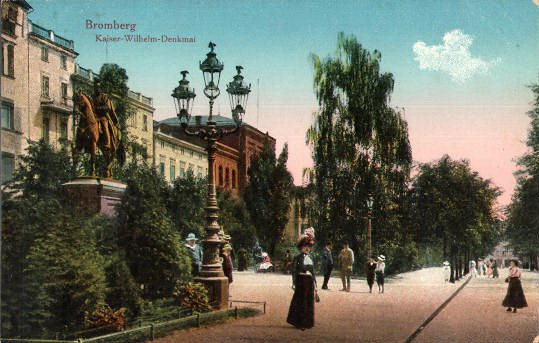
Freedom Square c. 1914

The land square was formerly part of the garden of 17th century monastery "Sisters of the Poor Clares", along with the area of today's park Casimir the Great. In 1835, the Bydgoszcz City Beautification Society ((in German) Verschönerungs – Verein zu Bromberg) founded on the east side of Gdańska Street a tree nursery tower grown to brighten up the eastern side of Gdanska Street. In 1854, a first and small square called the Place fodder (German: Kannonenplatz) existed. In 1859, the square was extended to the south and planted with trees and greenery, the entire project being financed by Major General Helmut Carl Christian von Weltzien. In 1860, the square was named in his honor (German: Weltzienplatz). Nursery trees in the square still functioned for several years, however, their importance was gradually reduced to the benefit of surfaces on which were erected buildings, High School Nr.1 and a church.

Originally its shape was a large rectangular square, with streets dividing it into four quarters. In 1873, the southern part of the square was used for the construction of the Lutheran church of St Peter's and St Paul. On 17 September 1893 a statue of Emperor Wilhelm I on horseback was erected in the center of the square: it was erected "in memoriam" of the deceased emperor, as a tribute to the creator of the German Reich and the father of the nation. The monument was funded partly by the city, partly by donation from wealthy citizens, like among others, Lewin Louis Aronsohn or Heinrich Dietz. This monument was short lived: after Bydgoszcz returned to Polish territory in 1919, the statue was dismantled and moved to the city of Meseritz (Międzyrzecz).

Later, in 1904, on the fringe of the Municipal Park (now the Park Casimir the Great) was established the monumental sculpted fountain "The Deluge". It remained for 40 years the most attractive sculpture of the city and a symbol of downtown Bydgoszcz, before being partially dismantled and melted down by German forces.

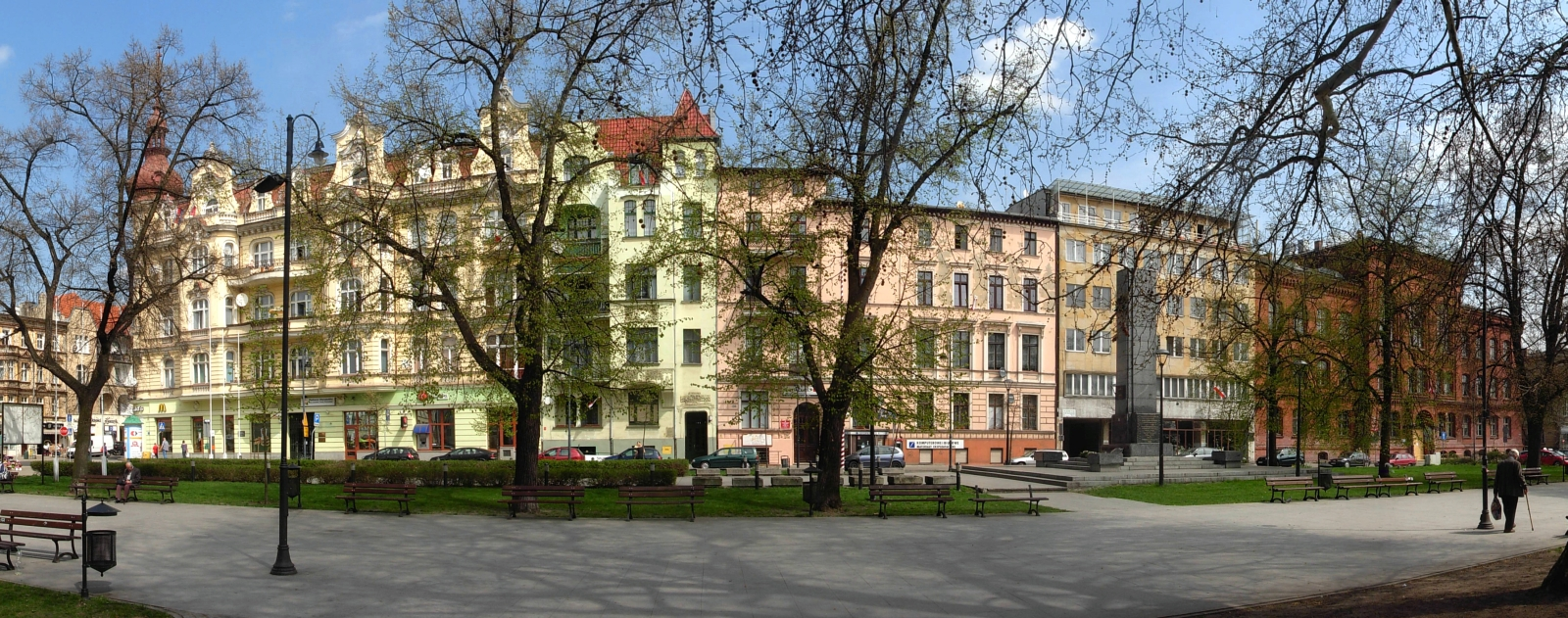
Panoramic view of the facades of Nr.1,3,5,7 and High School n.1 (left to right)

During the interwar period, Freedom Square was one of the most charming and well-kept places in Bydgoszcz, embellished by carpets of flowers. In 1938, a reconstruction project run by engineer Stefan Pietrzak modified the appearance of the square: the area adjacent to Gdańska Street was converted into a parking lot, with a lawn area leading to the park Casimir the Great.

In 1945, a memorial to freedom has been by architect Jan Kossowski at the center of the square, in honor of Soviet and Polish soldiers – liberators of the city from Nazi occupation. The monument still exists today, yet it was rebuilt in 1991, adding the following words, "Civitas Bydgostiensis Libera". In 1995, a bronze bas-relief (by Aleksander Dętkoś) was fixed on the memorial, commemorating both the fight for independence of the Poles and the return of Bydgoszcz city to Poland on 20 January 1920.

During the Polish People's Republic, a cannon stood on the square, in honor of a lieutenant colonel of the Red Army, Grzegorz Ivanovich Bolshanin. It was removed in 1964.

In 2023, city authorities launched a revitalization project of the entire square, with focus to the ground surface, green surroundings, aesthetic flower pavilions and the razing of the Freedom Monument. In summer 2026, the renovation works were completed and the Freedom Monument was being torn down.

== Architecture ==
The Freedom Square is enclosed by several different buildings on its northern front, several styles being represented, including Art Nouveau at Nr.3, Eclecticism at N.1 and 5, and Modern architecture at N.7. The neo-Romanesque St Peter's and St Paul's Church and the oldest city park lie on its southern border. The western side is delimited by Gdańska Street and Gimnazjalna street borders the east side.

Since 2004, restoration works have led to the recovering of the historic shape of the fountain "the Deluge", completed in 2014. In 2009–2010, a program of revitalization of the square has been carried out (alleys and greenery), together with a refurbishment of main facades.

== Main locations and buildings ==
St Peter's and St Paul's Church registered on Kuyavian-Pomeranian Voivodeship heritage list, Nr.A/62, 5 October 1971.

Built in 1872–1878, by Berlin architect Friedrich Adler: Eclecticism and Gothic Revival.

From 1878 to 1945, the temple was devoted to the congregation of the Evangelical Union. In 1945, it has been dedicated to Catholic liturgy, then to a parish church since 1946. Above the main altar stands a painting of the Immaculate Conception of the Blessed Virgin Mary (1850), by Maksymilian Piotrowski, inspired from the former Jesuit church standing at the very place.

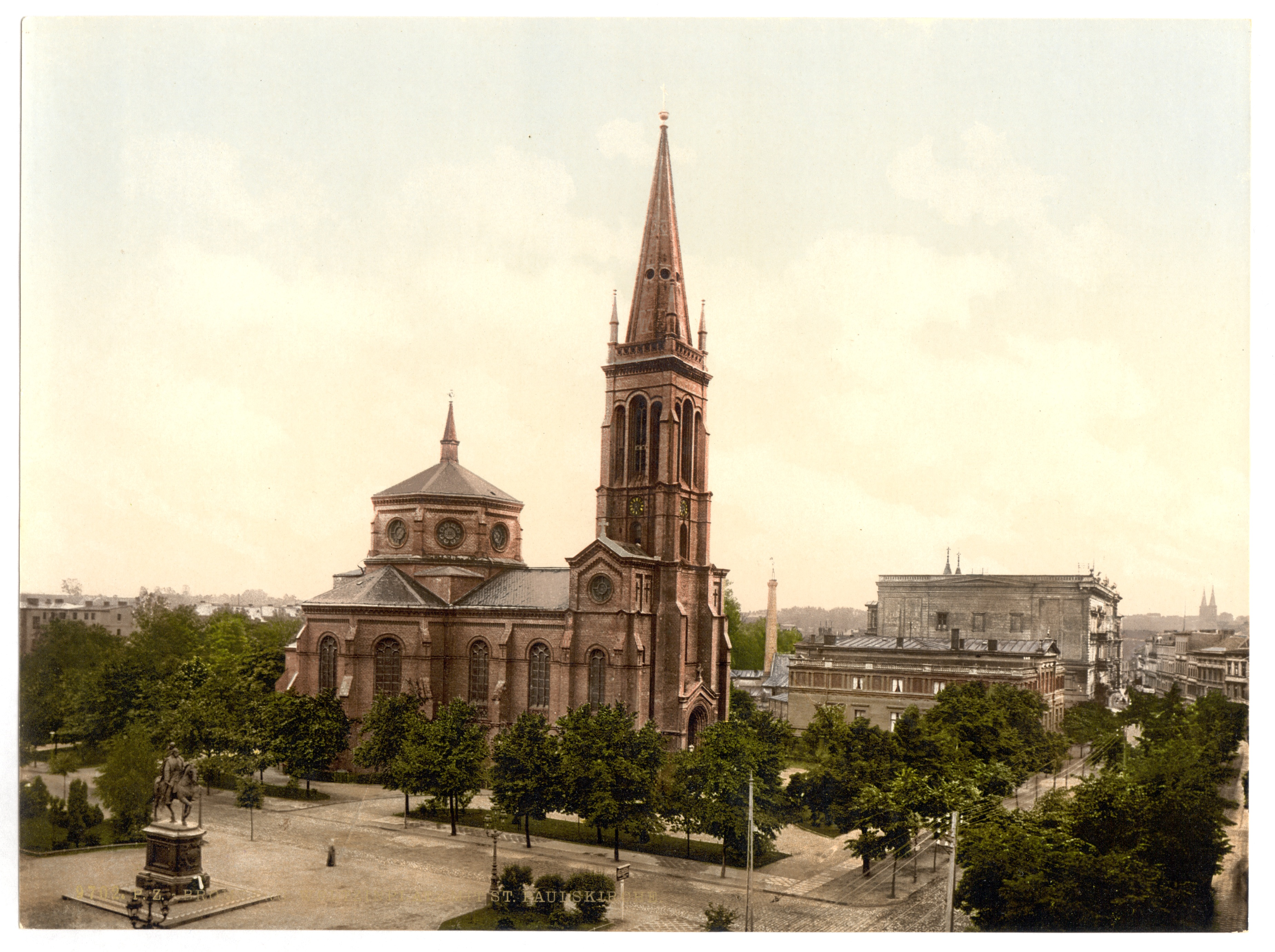
The church and the square ("Weltzin Platz") ca 1900

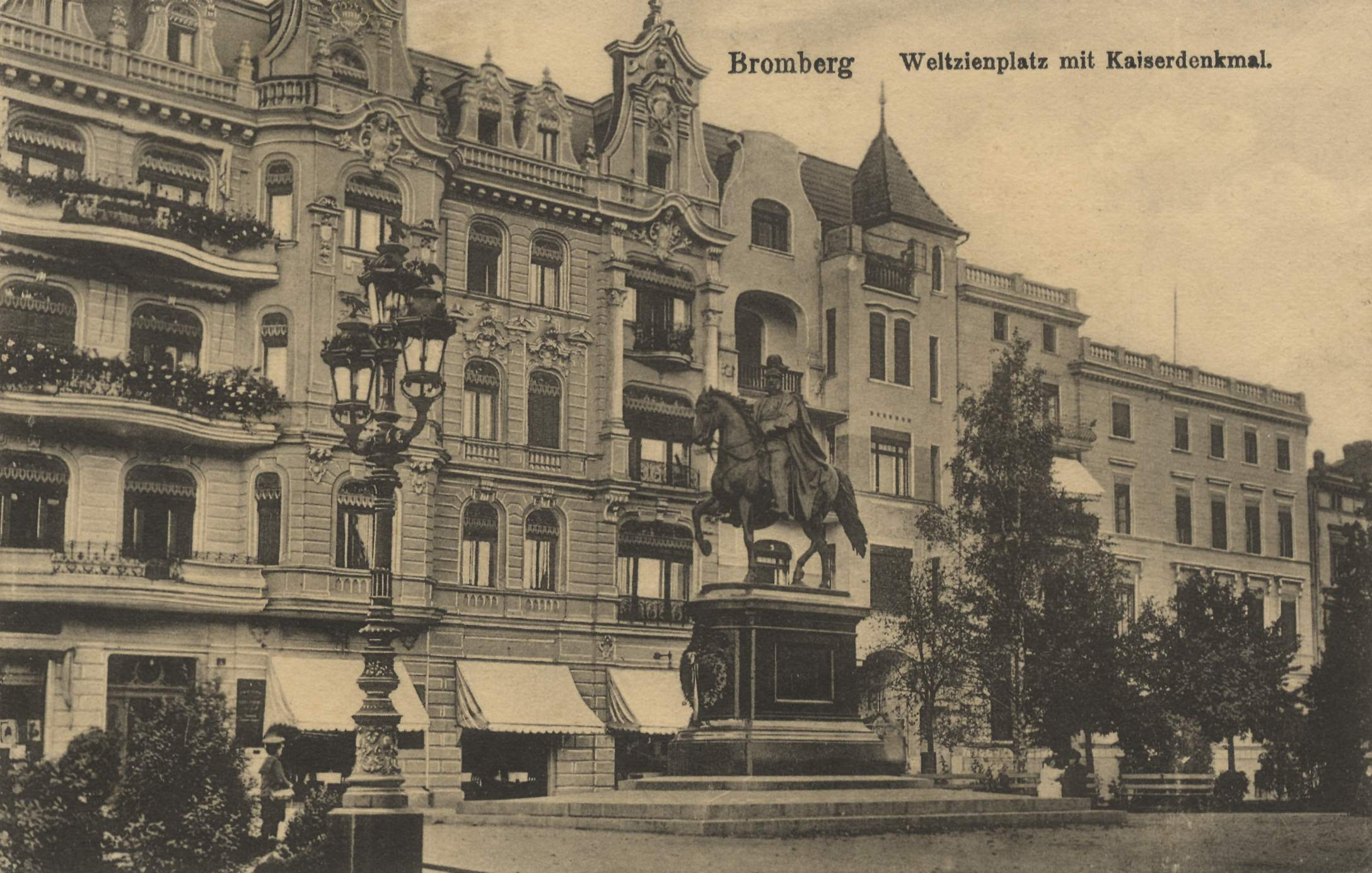
Statue of Emperor Wilhelm on Weltzienplatz square

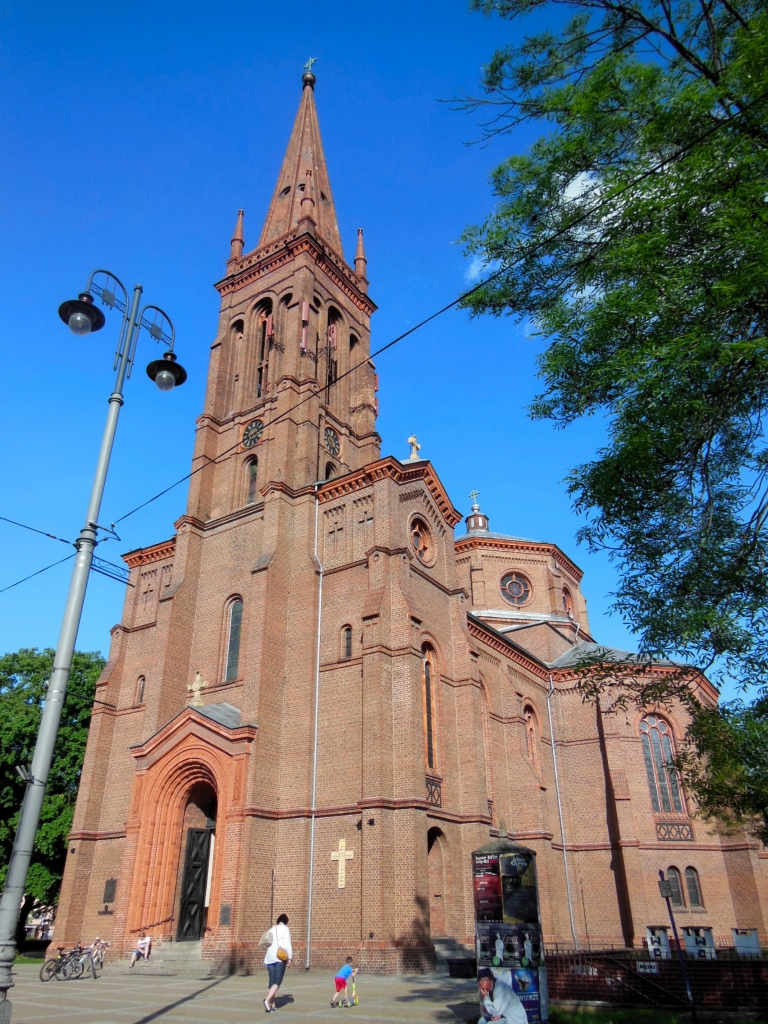
View from Gdańska Street

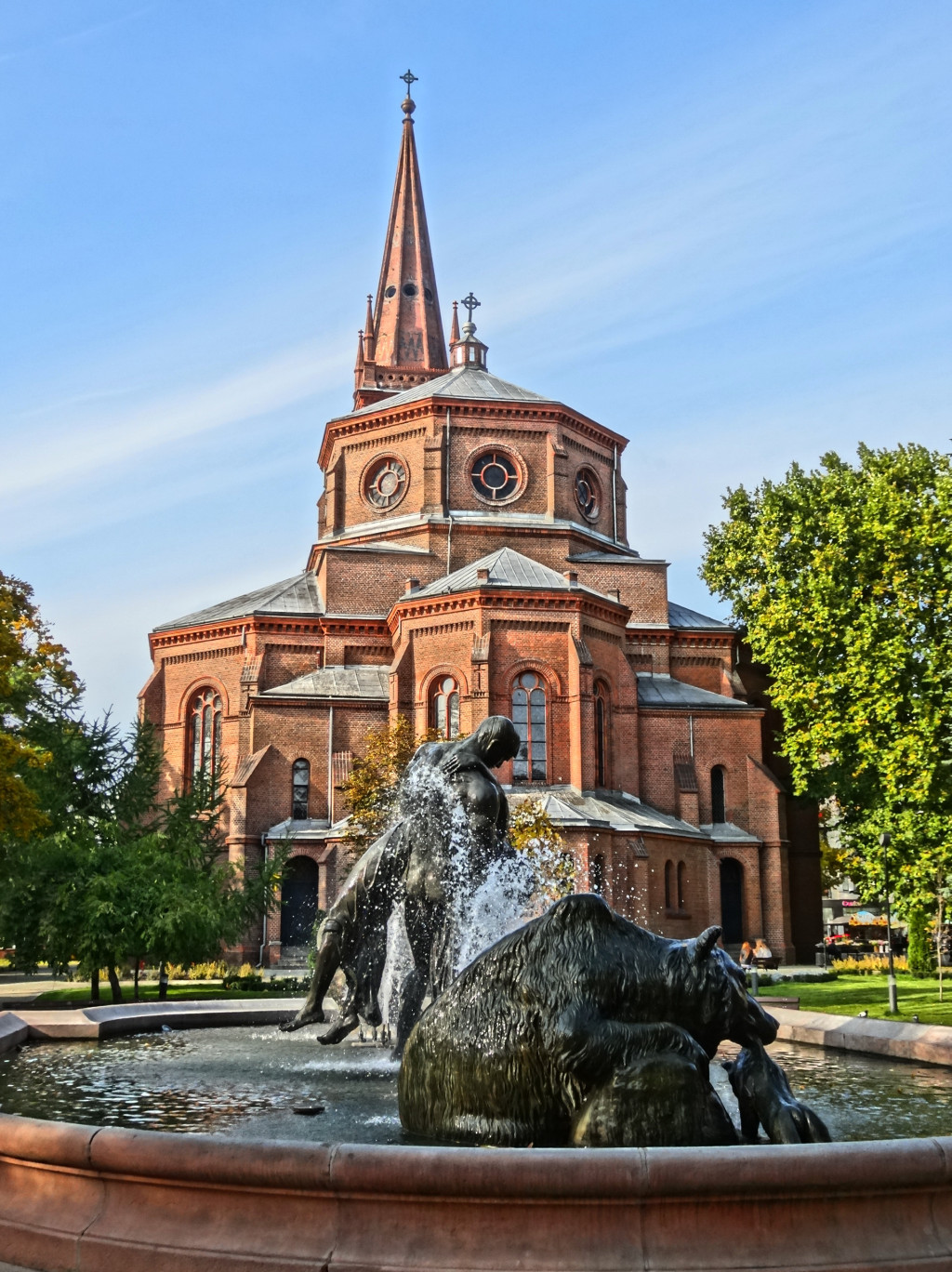
View from the foutain "Deluge"

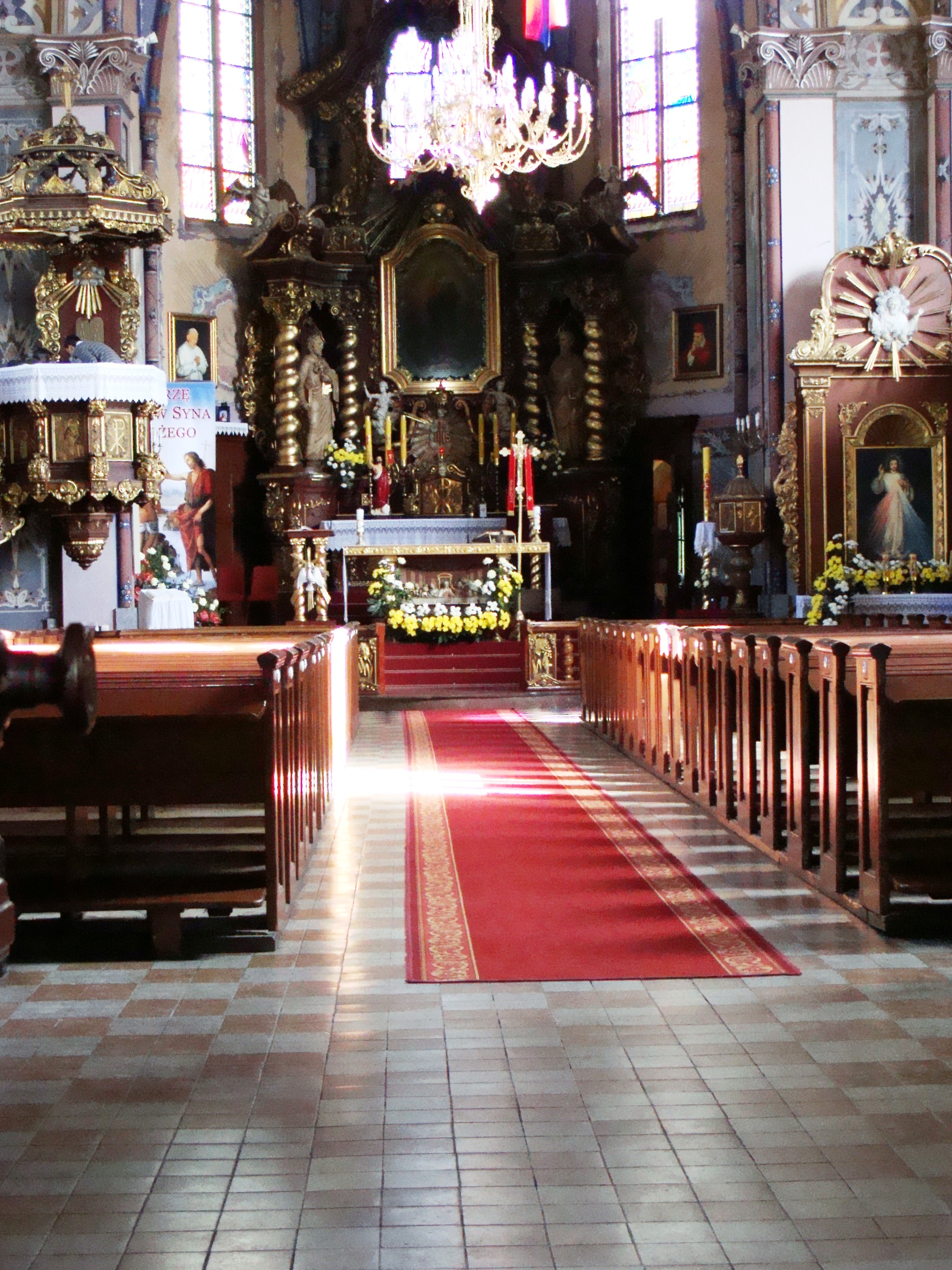
View of the nave

Tenement at Freedom Square 1

Registered on Kuyavian-Pomeranian Voivodeship heritage list, Nr.601429, Reg.A/1041 20 October 1990,.

Built in 1896–1898 by Józef Święcicki: Eclecticism and Neo-Baroque.

One of the most famous works of Józef Święcicki, a fecund Bydgoszcz architect from the start of the twentieth century. The building is famous for its sophisticated design and the architectural forms of the facade. The corner tower is topped with a bulbous dome.

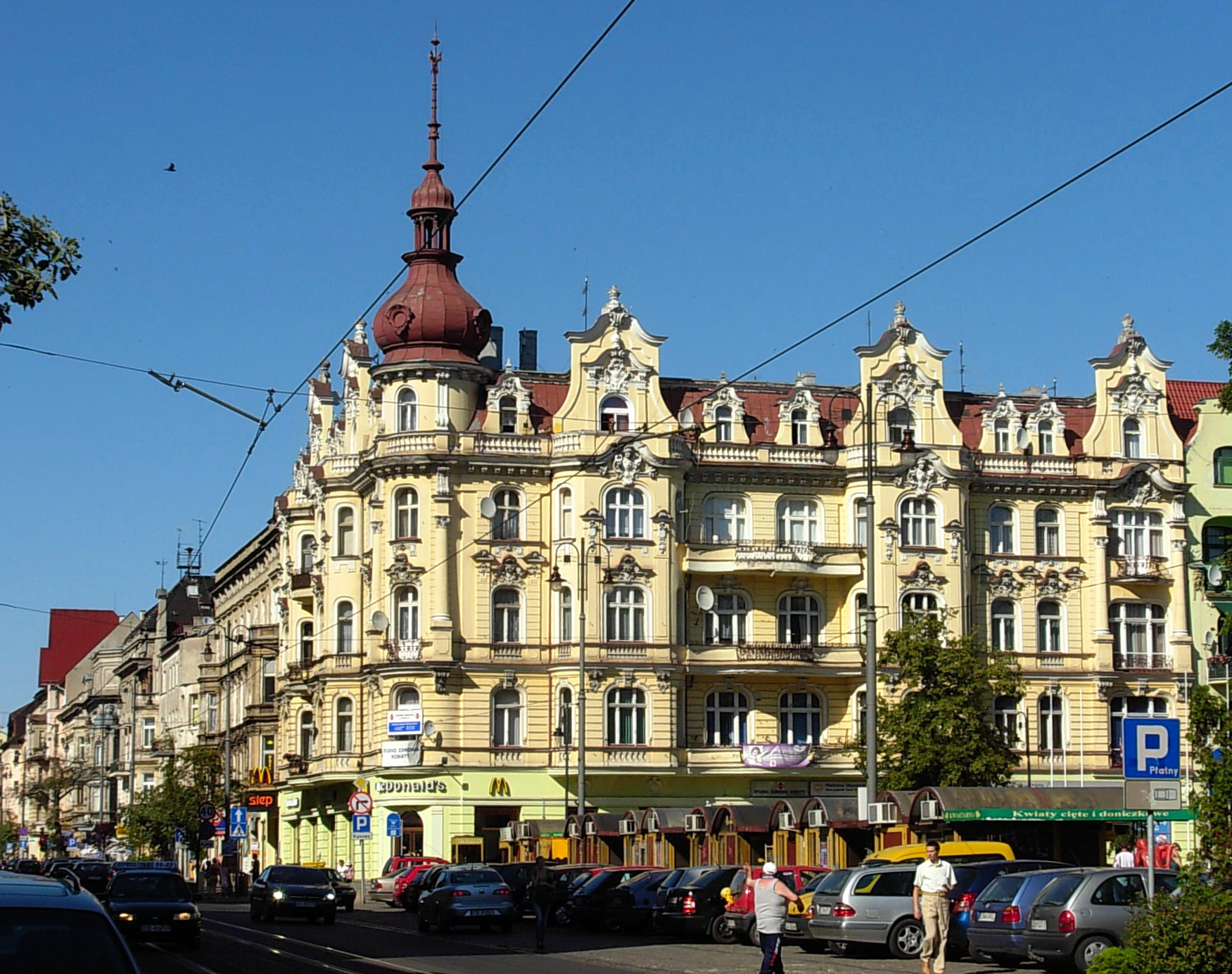
View from Gdańska Street

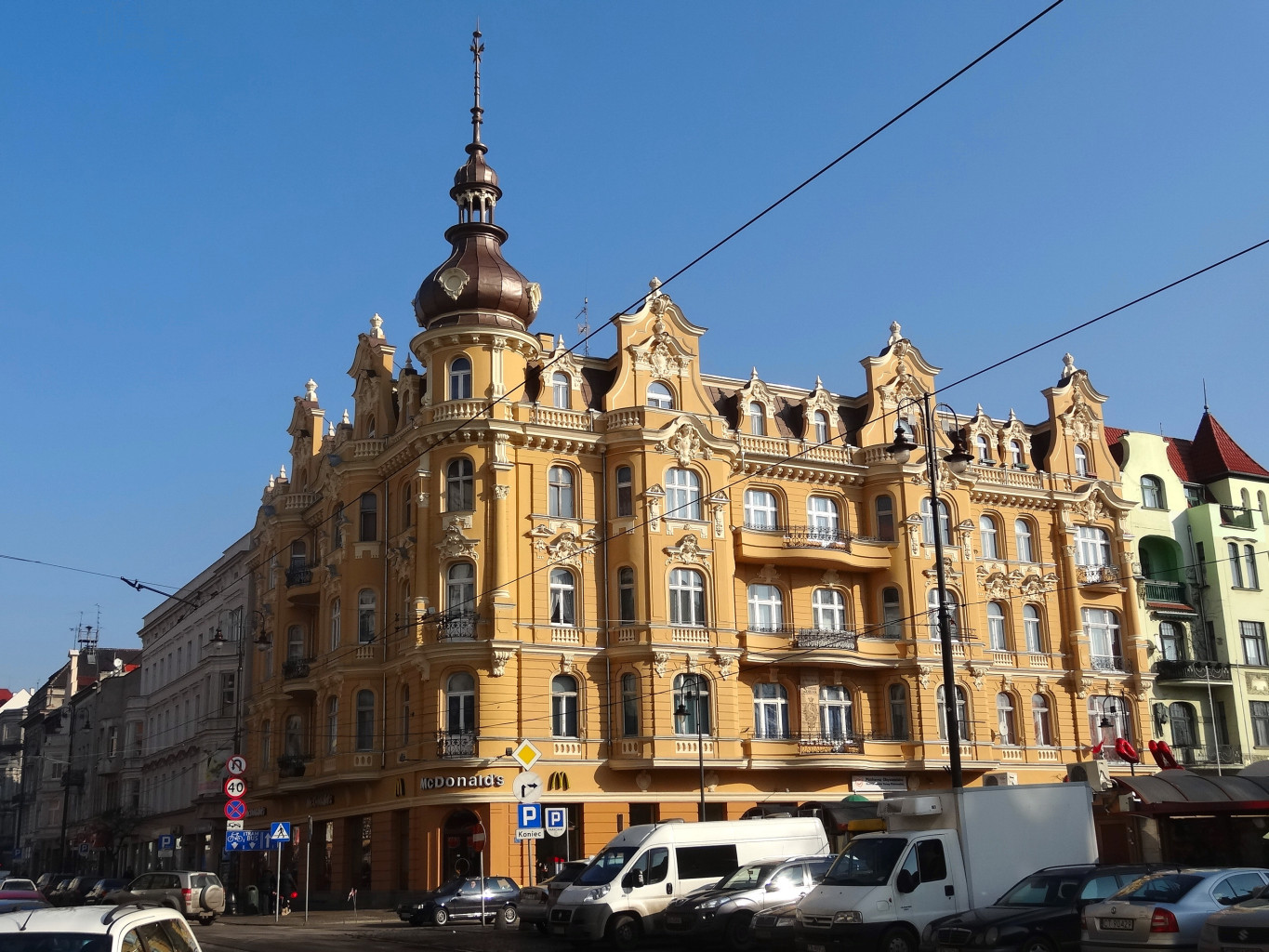
View of the facade on Freedom Square

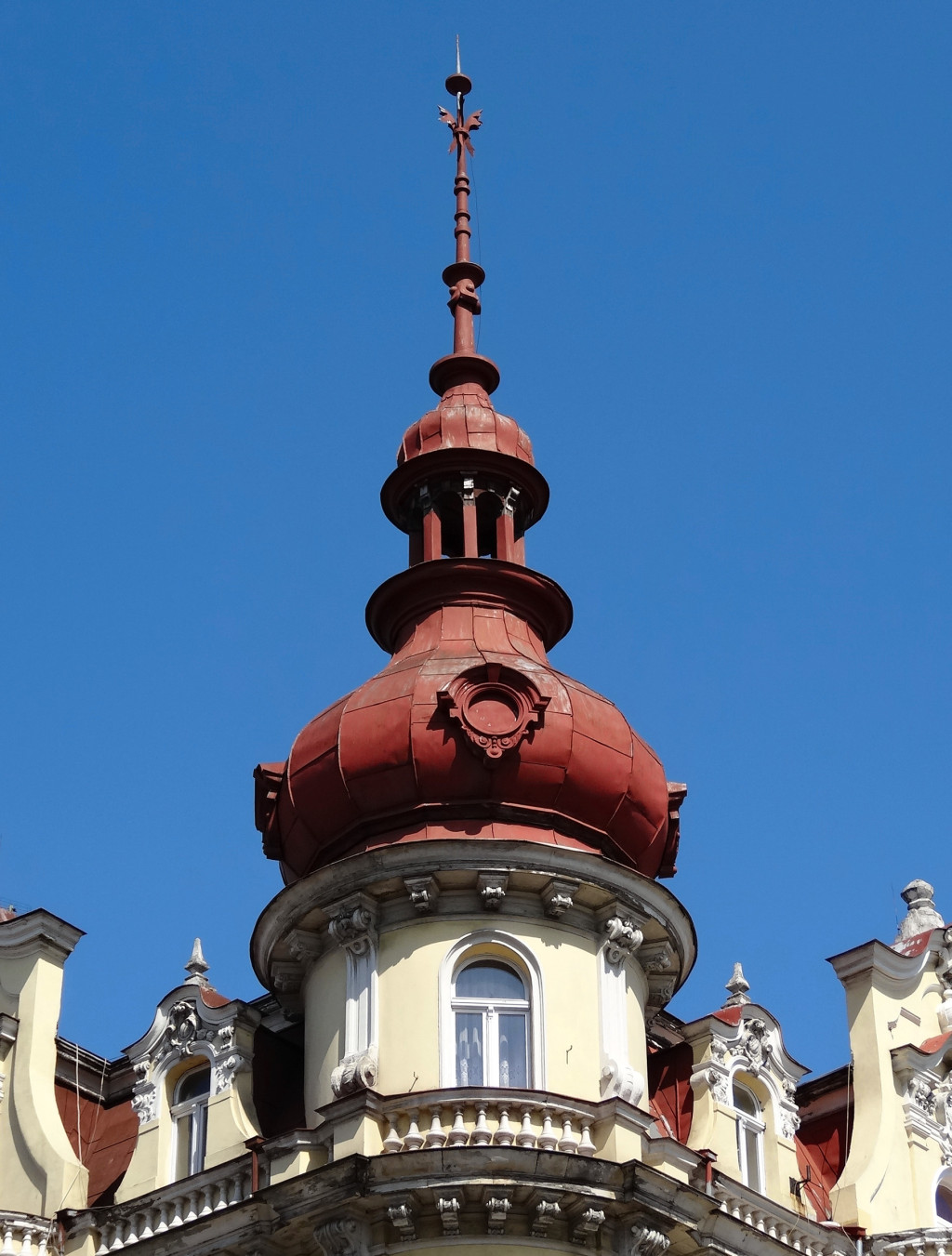
Detail of the corner spire

Tenement at 3 registered on Kuyavian-Pomeranian Voivodeship heritage list, Nr.oA/257/1, 6 May 1991.

Built in 1903, by Fritz Weidner: Historicism and Polish secession.

The building was ordered by Carl Ruckenschuch, a merchant to Fritz Weidner, as his family house.

The edifice has an asymmetrical façade, the way Weidner design other tenements (e.g. at Gdańska Street Nr.28, Nr.31 or Nr.34), with typical Art Nouveau motifs: feminine masks, owls and beehive. Interiors too have retained some Art Nouveau elements such as the stairwell with nice wall tiles. The plaque on the façade reminds people that in this building lived and worked Andrzej Nowacki for 50 years. A sculpture "Jeans Andrew" by Peter Wagner was unveiled in the 11th anniversary of the death of the artist, as a tribute to the Bydgoszcz art painter. "Jeans Andrew" refers to the artist's most famous cycle – "Udżinsowieni" whose main theme is blue pants. Jeans were for Andrew Nowacki symbol of the times, a symbol of freedom and youth, but on the other hand, is also a metaphor for submission to the fashion and cultural schemes.

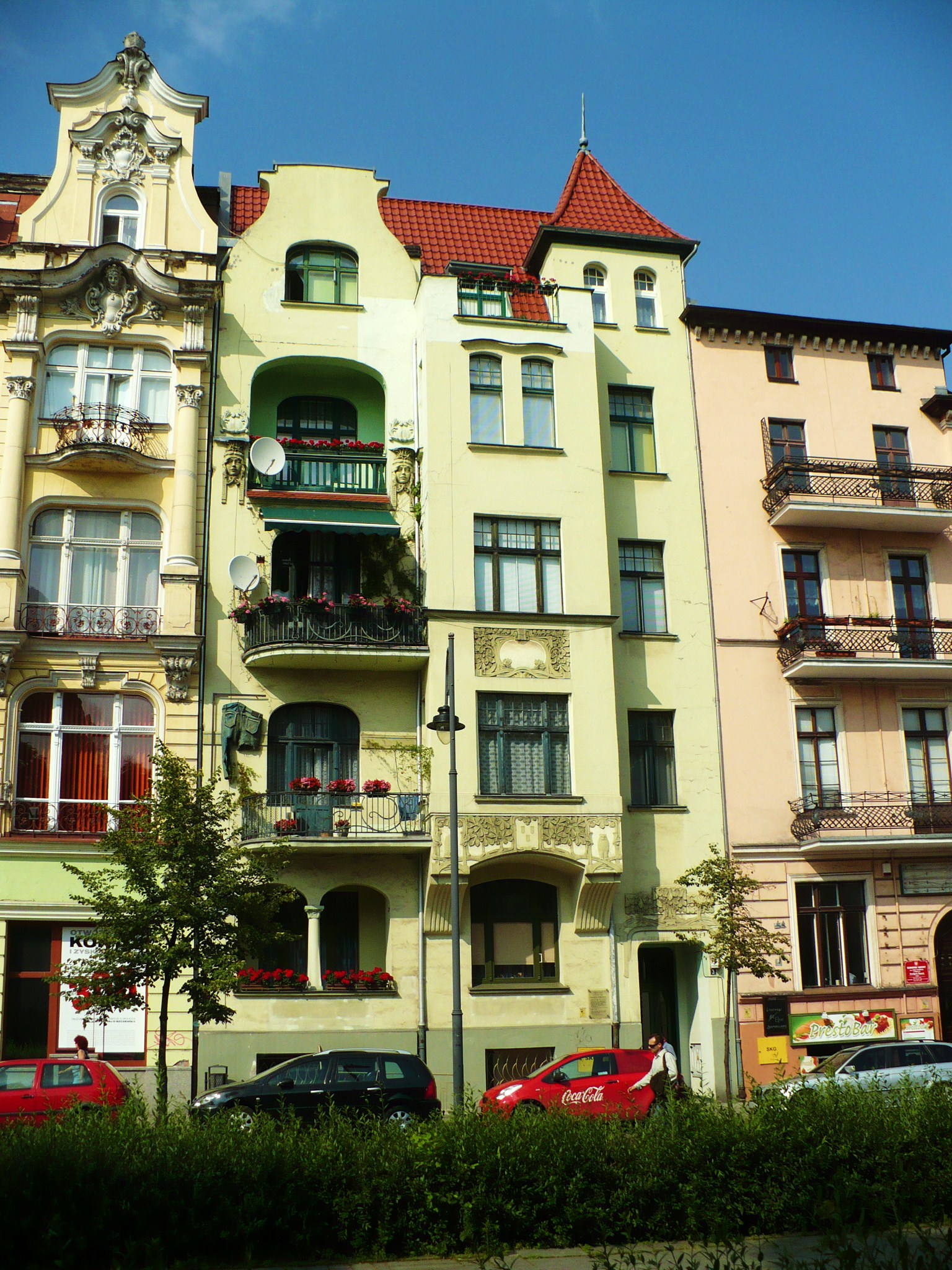
View of the facade on Freedom Square

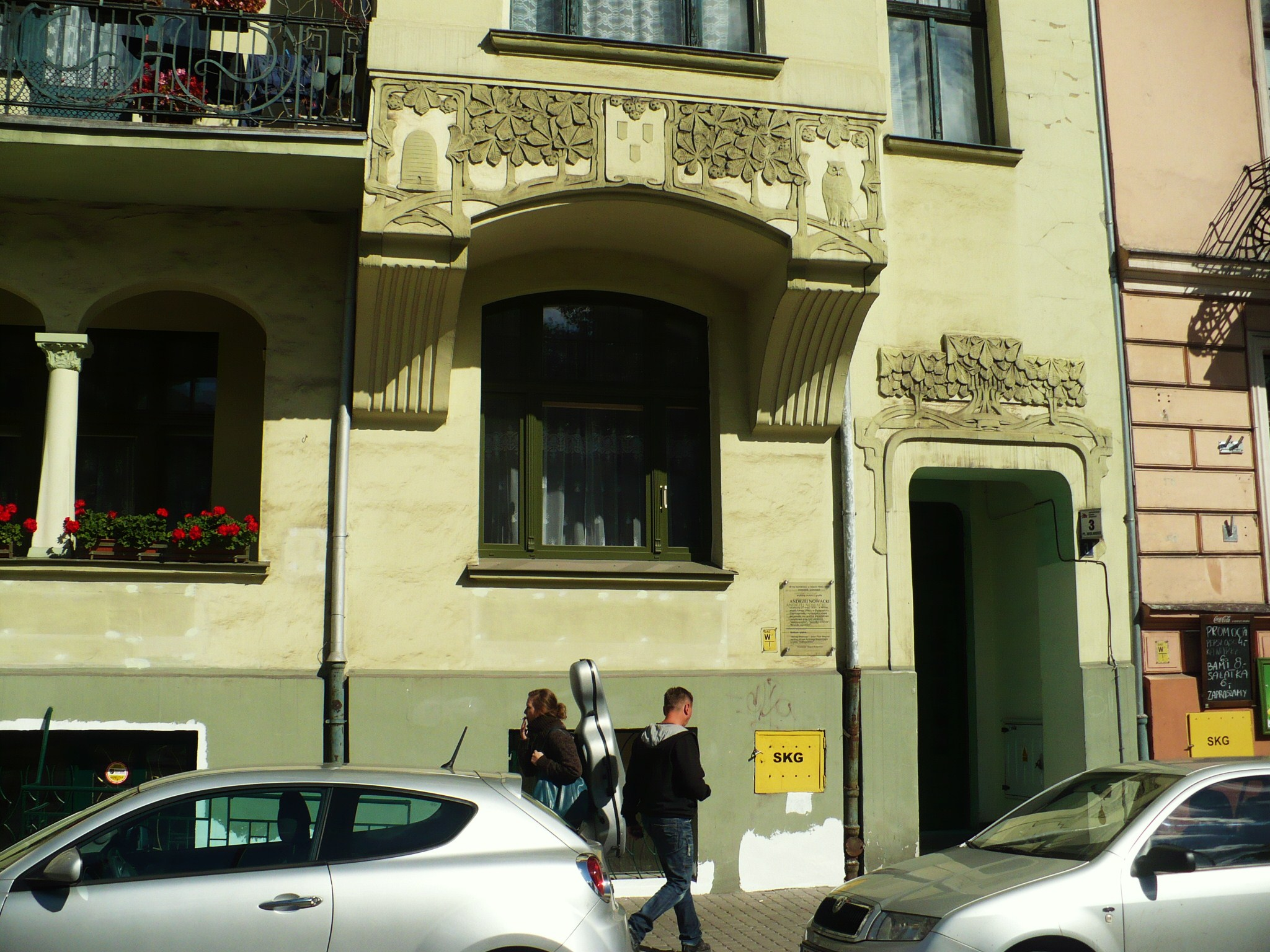
Detail of motifs

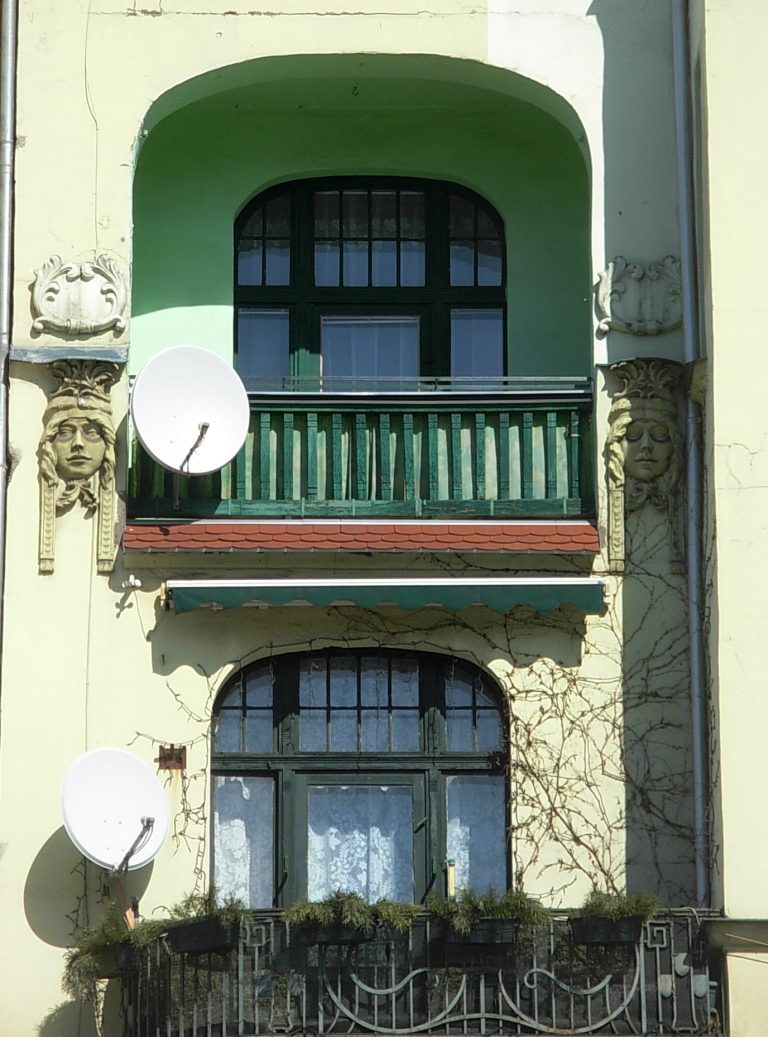
Detail of motifs

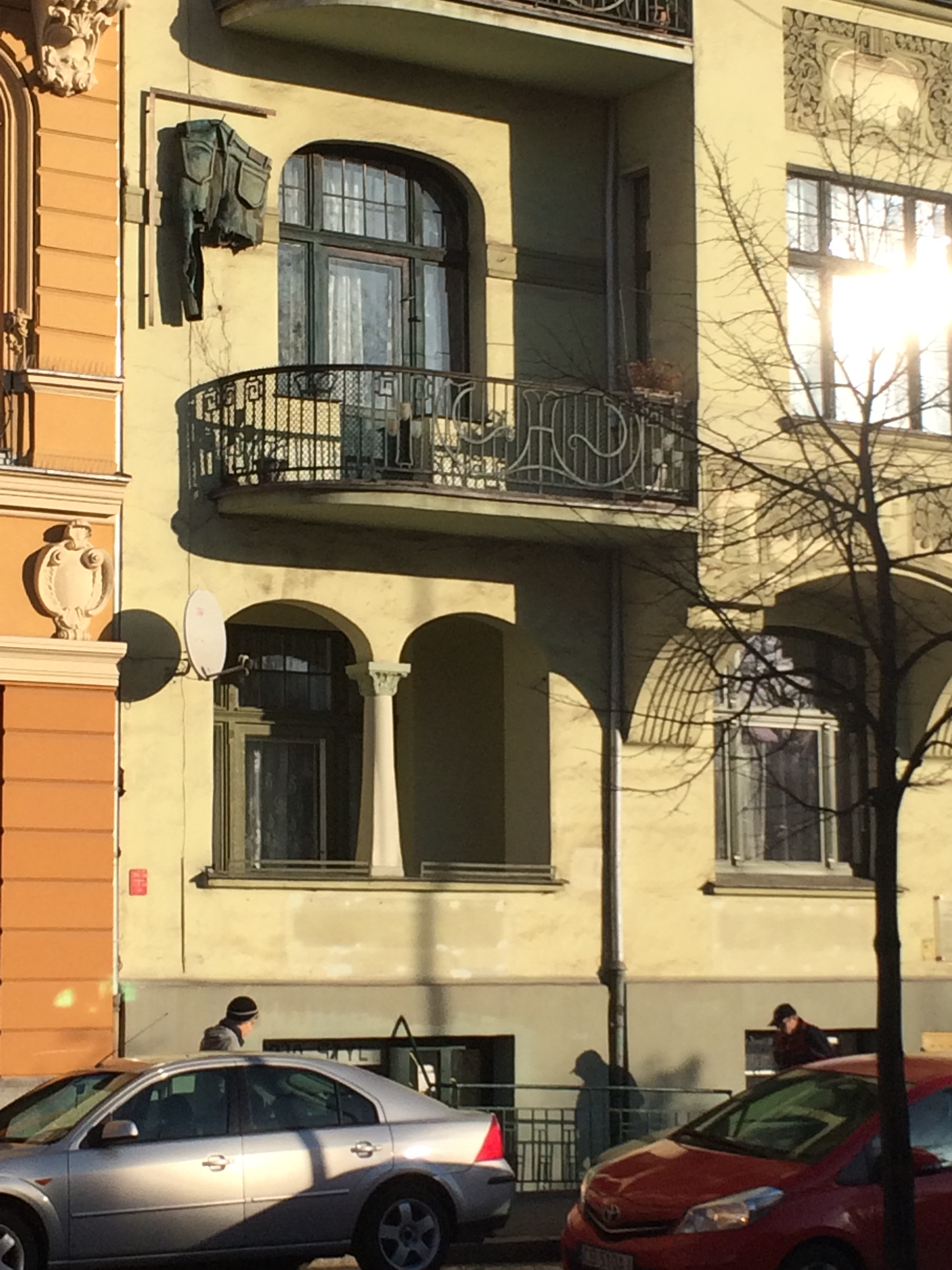
Detail of the facade with the "Jeans Andrew" art work

Tenement at 5, registered on Kuyavian-Pomeranian Voivodeship heritage list, Nr.A/278/1, 1 October 1991.

Built in 1880–1890: Eclecticism.

The building still features nice interiors: plastered ceiling in the hallway and ancient stoves in some flats. The main entry corridor displays stuccoed pilasters and a multicolored terrazzo floor with geometric motifs.

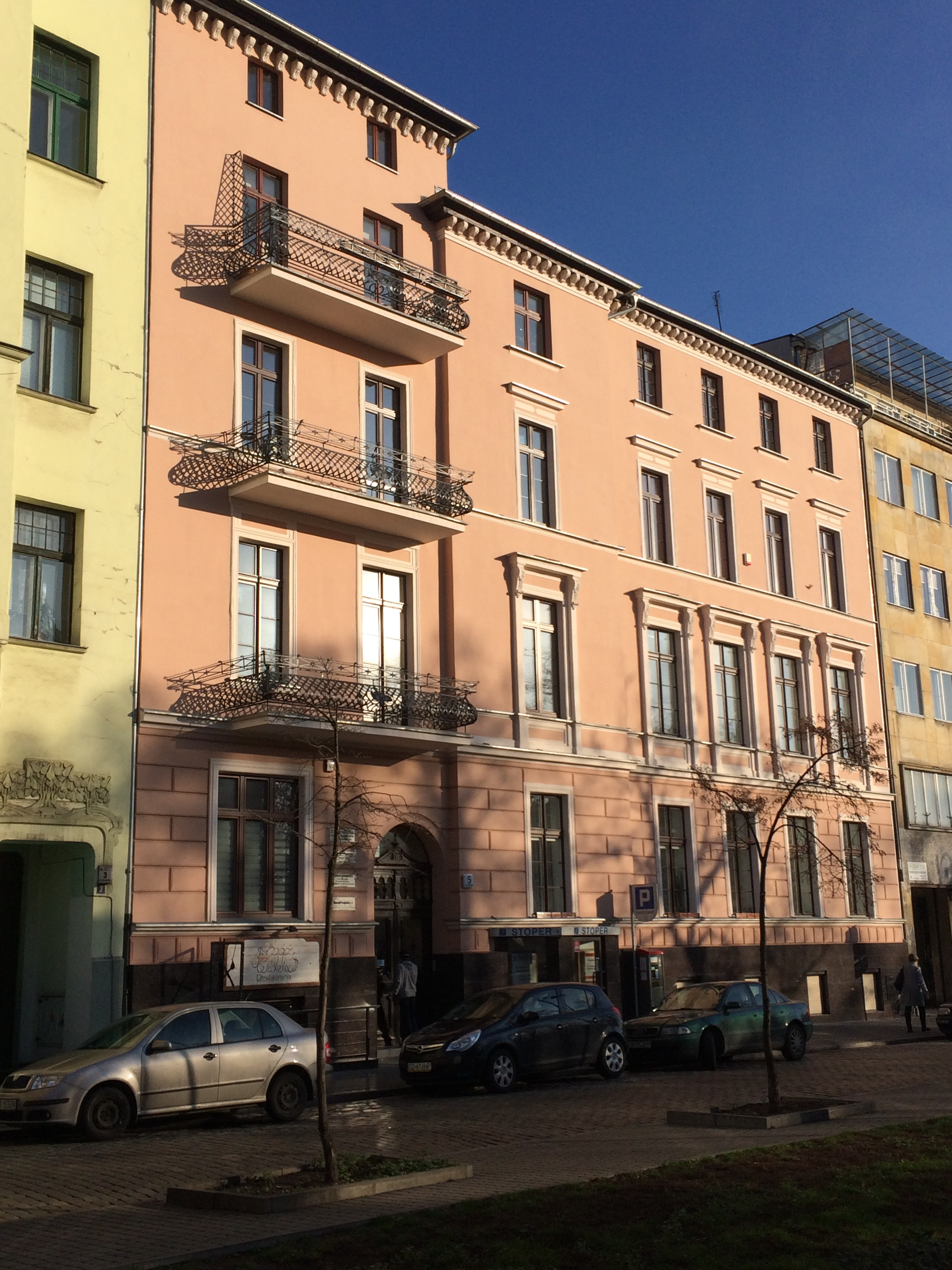
Main facade view from the square

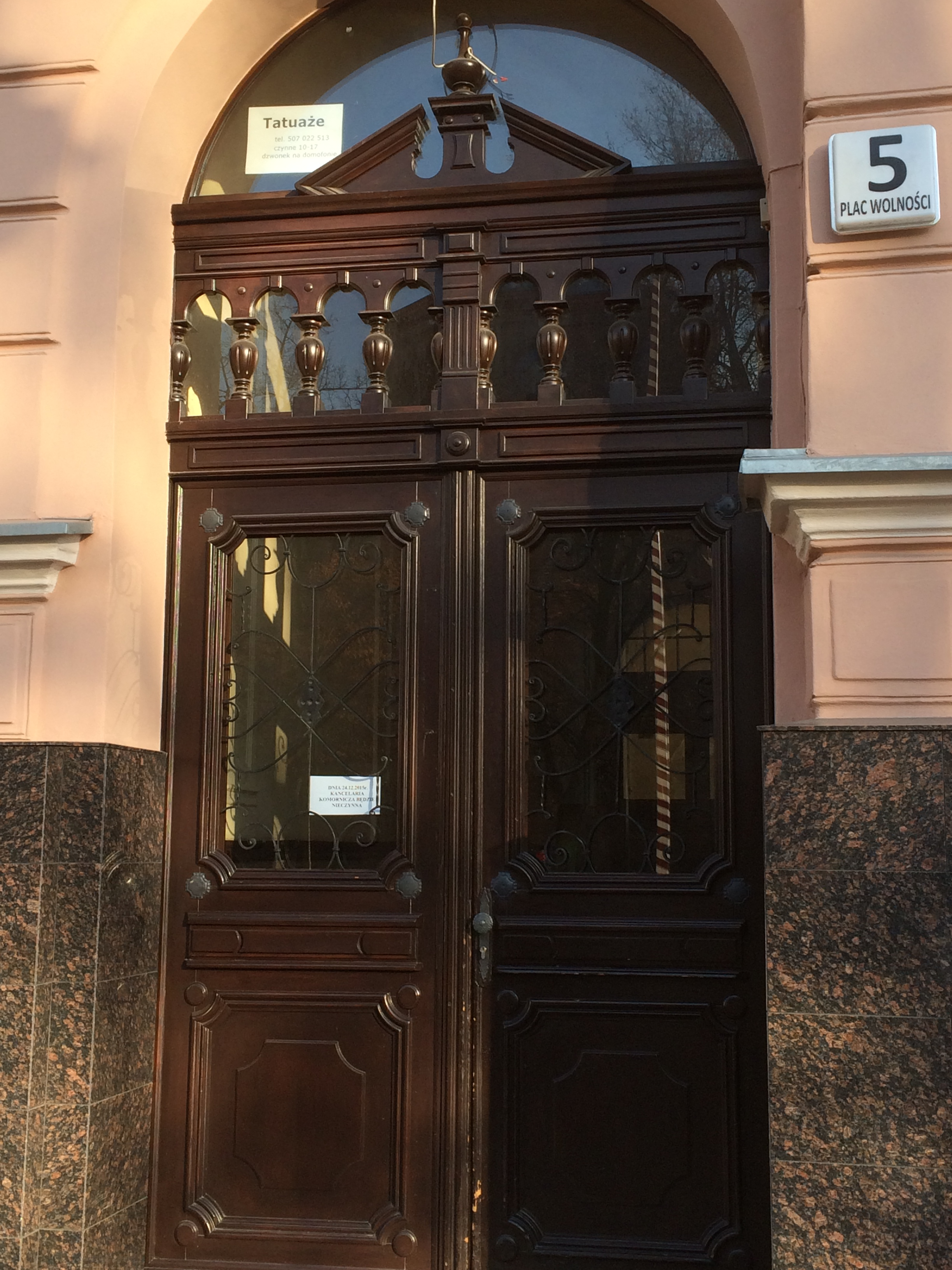
Detail of the gate

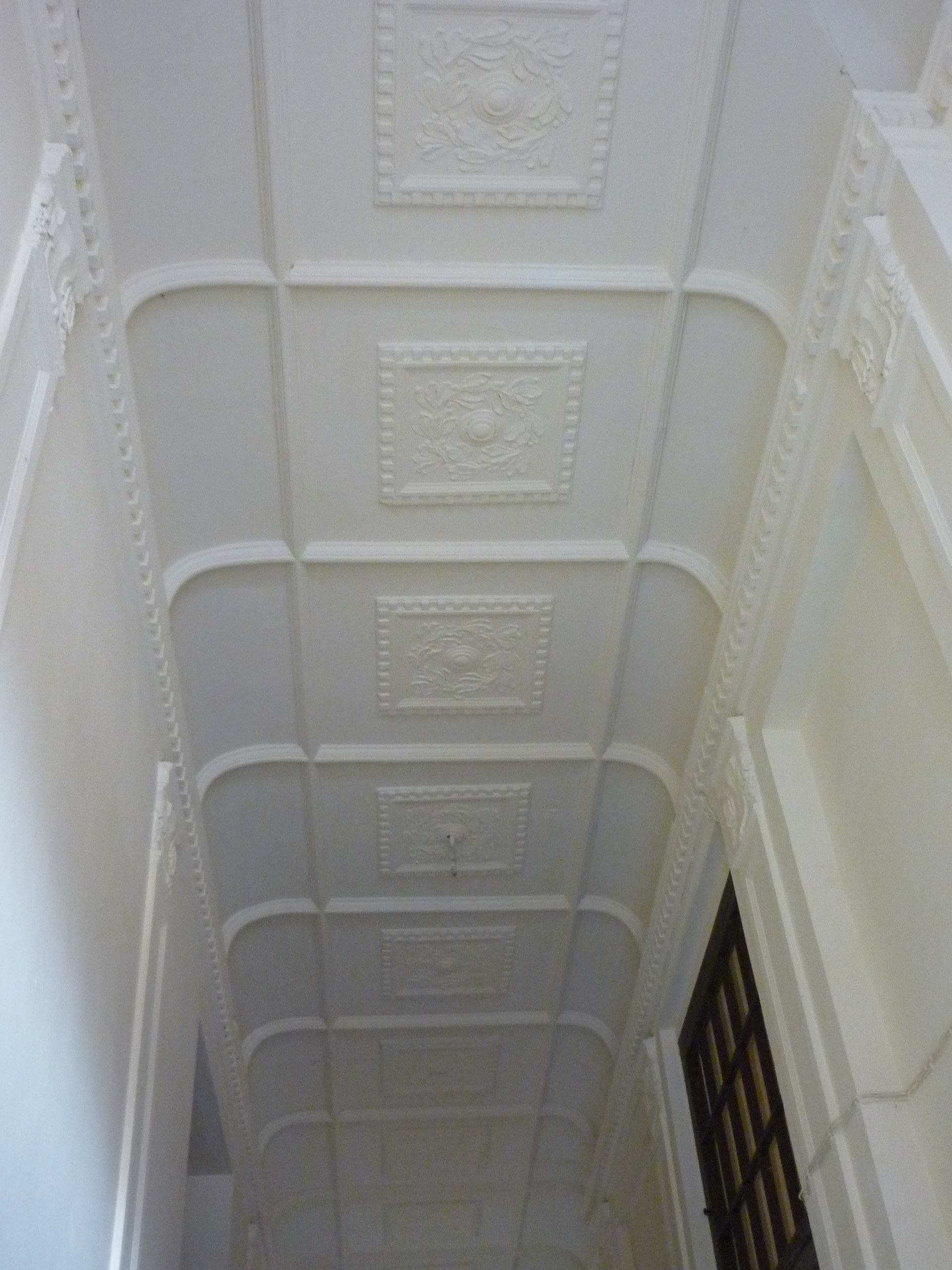
Hallway ceiling

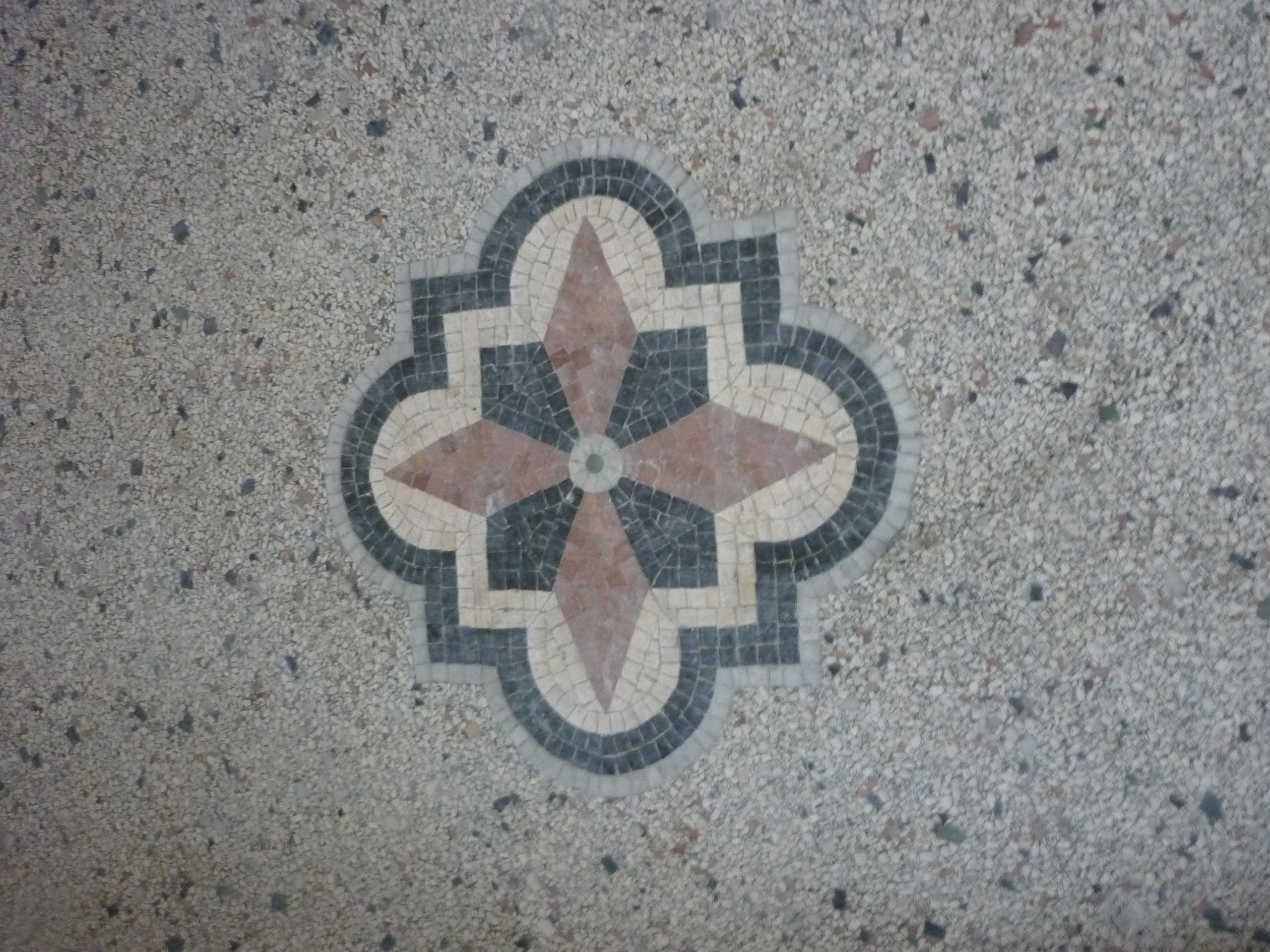
Hallway floor mosaic and terrazzo

Tenement at 7, 1939, by Jan Kossowski: Modern architecture.

The house was built according to a design by architect Jan Kossowski, who designed also Freedom Monument standing on the square. It is an example of Polish modernism of the interwar period. First owners of the building were an interior and furniture designer Jacob Hechliński, and the building designer Carl Meinhardt. The facade is clad with sandstone, and the glazed ground floor was originally occupied by a Chevrolet car dealer, Antoni Butowski.

During the Polish People's Republic'time (PRL) it housed a cafe, "Magnolia". Wacław Gieburowski, conductor of the Poznan Cathedral Choir, was born there as mentioned on commemorative plaque.

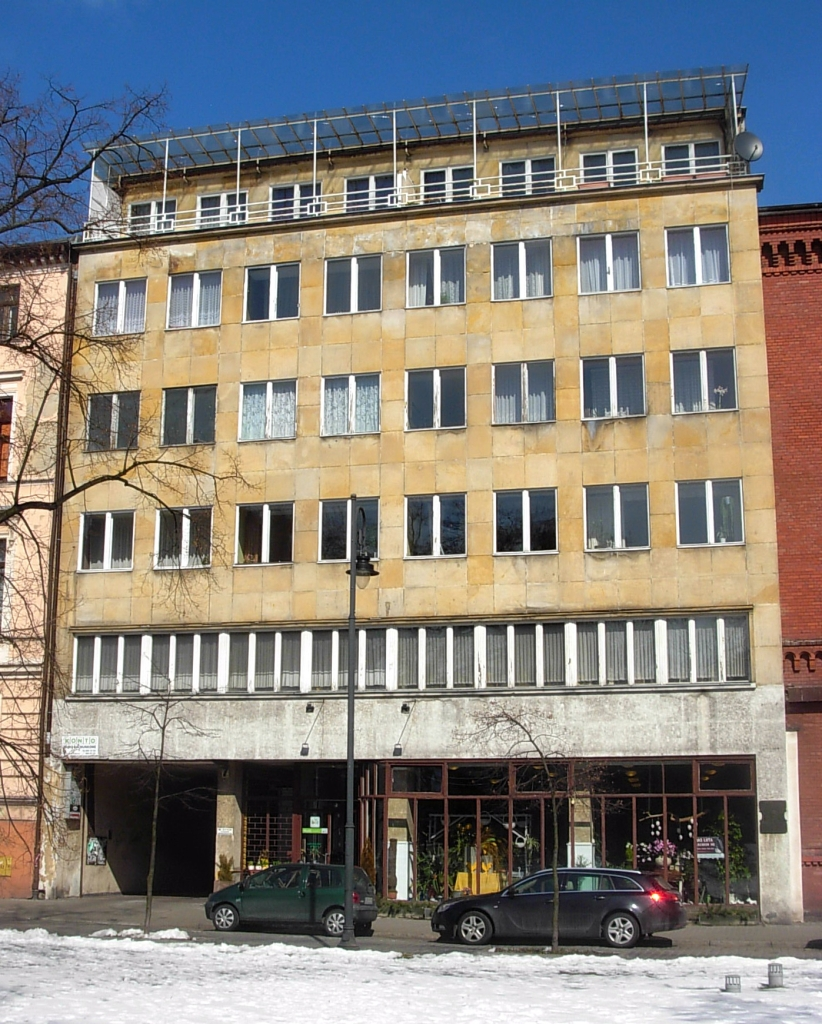
View from the square

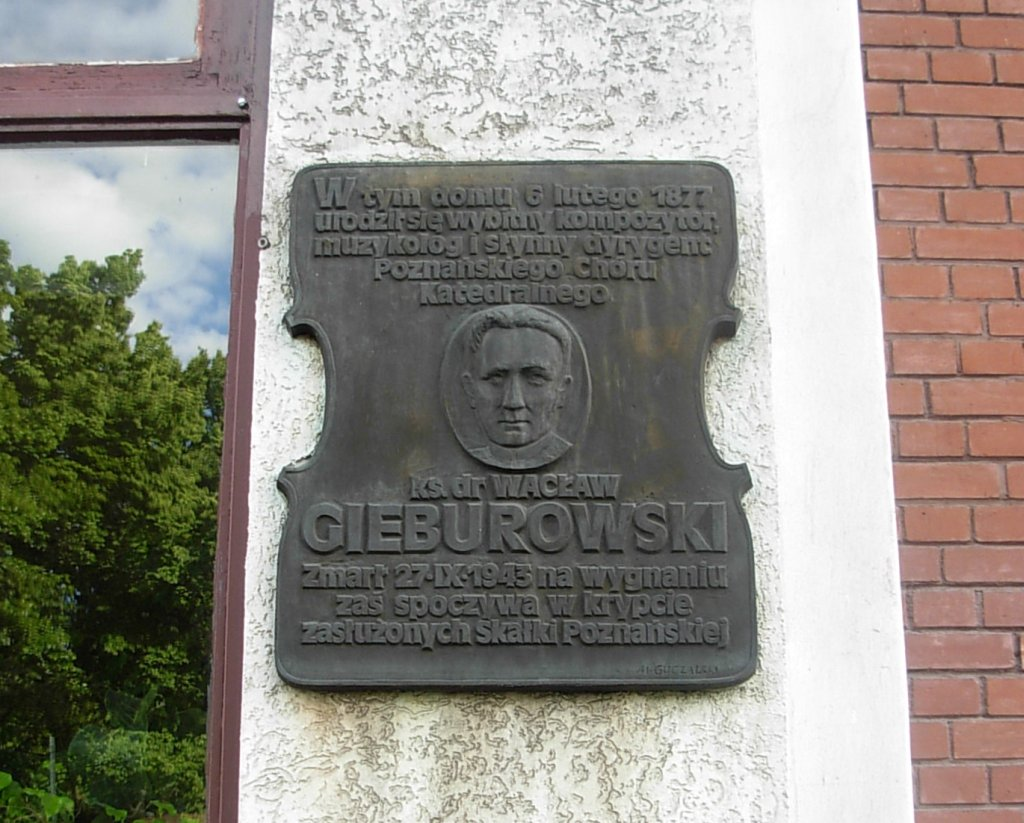
Commemorative plaque for Wacław Gieburowski

High School Nr.1

Registered on Kuyavian-Pomeranian Voivodeship heritage list, Nr.A/264/1, 28 May 1991.

Built in 1876–1877, by R. Oueissner: Neoclassicism.

Originally the seat of the German Royal Grammar School. In 1904–1905 a side wing was added. In 1920 the school was converted into State High School Classic, in 1938 it became the State High School and Middle School, and after World War II, High School in Bydgoszcz. The building is L-shaped, has two stories and an avant-corps.

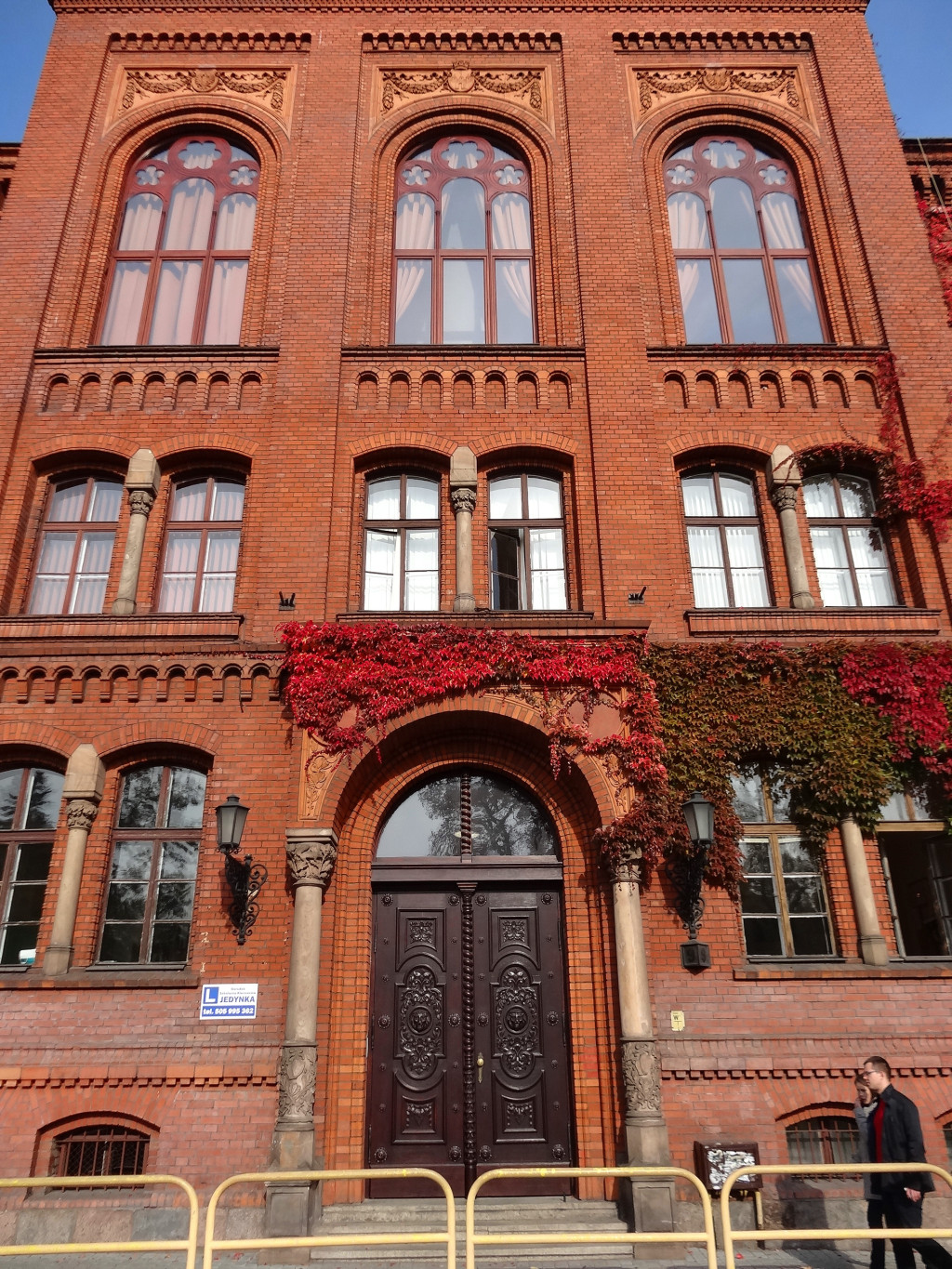
View from the square

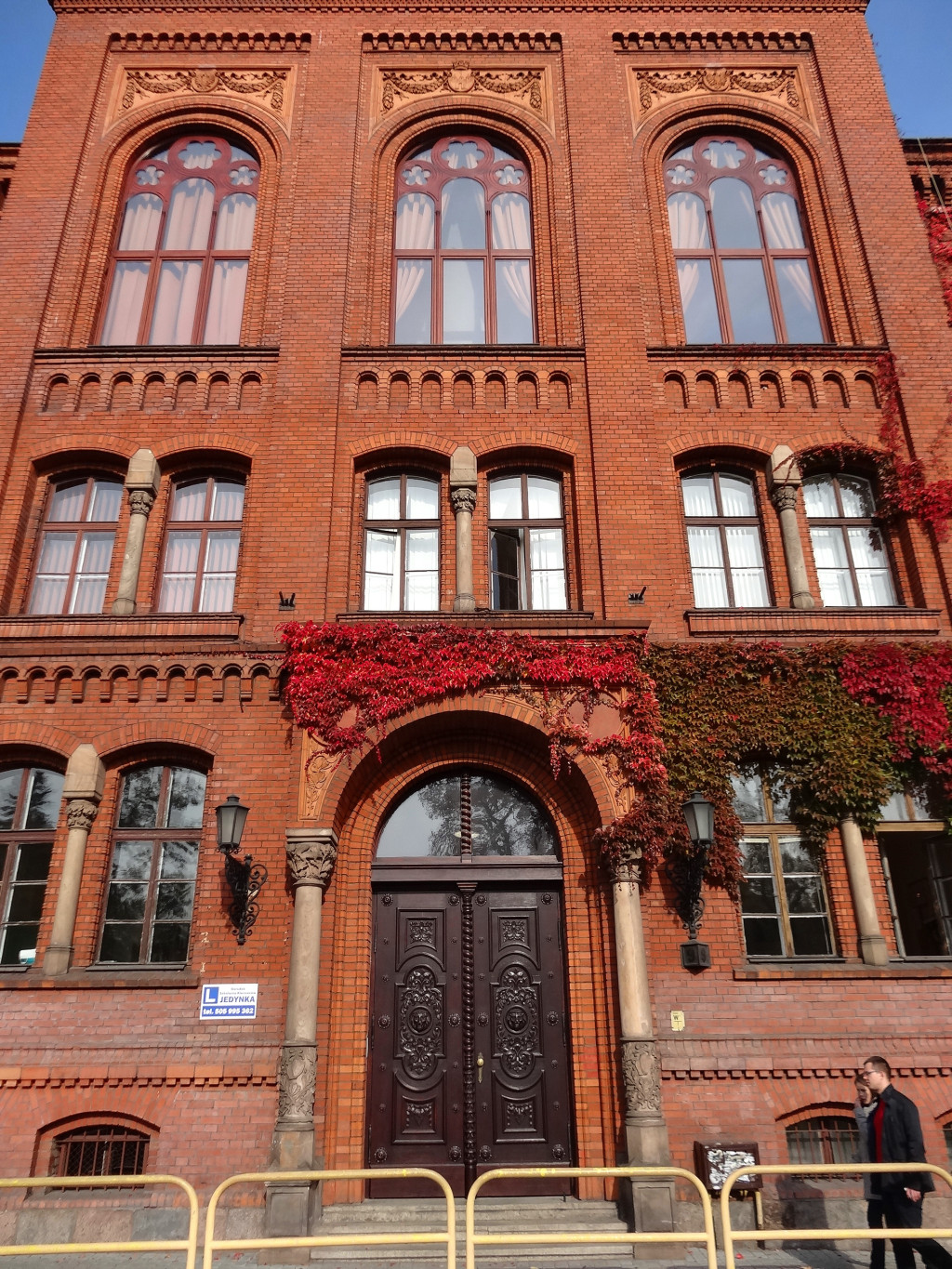
Detail of the avant-corps

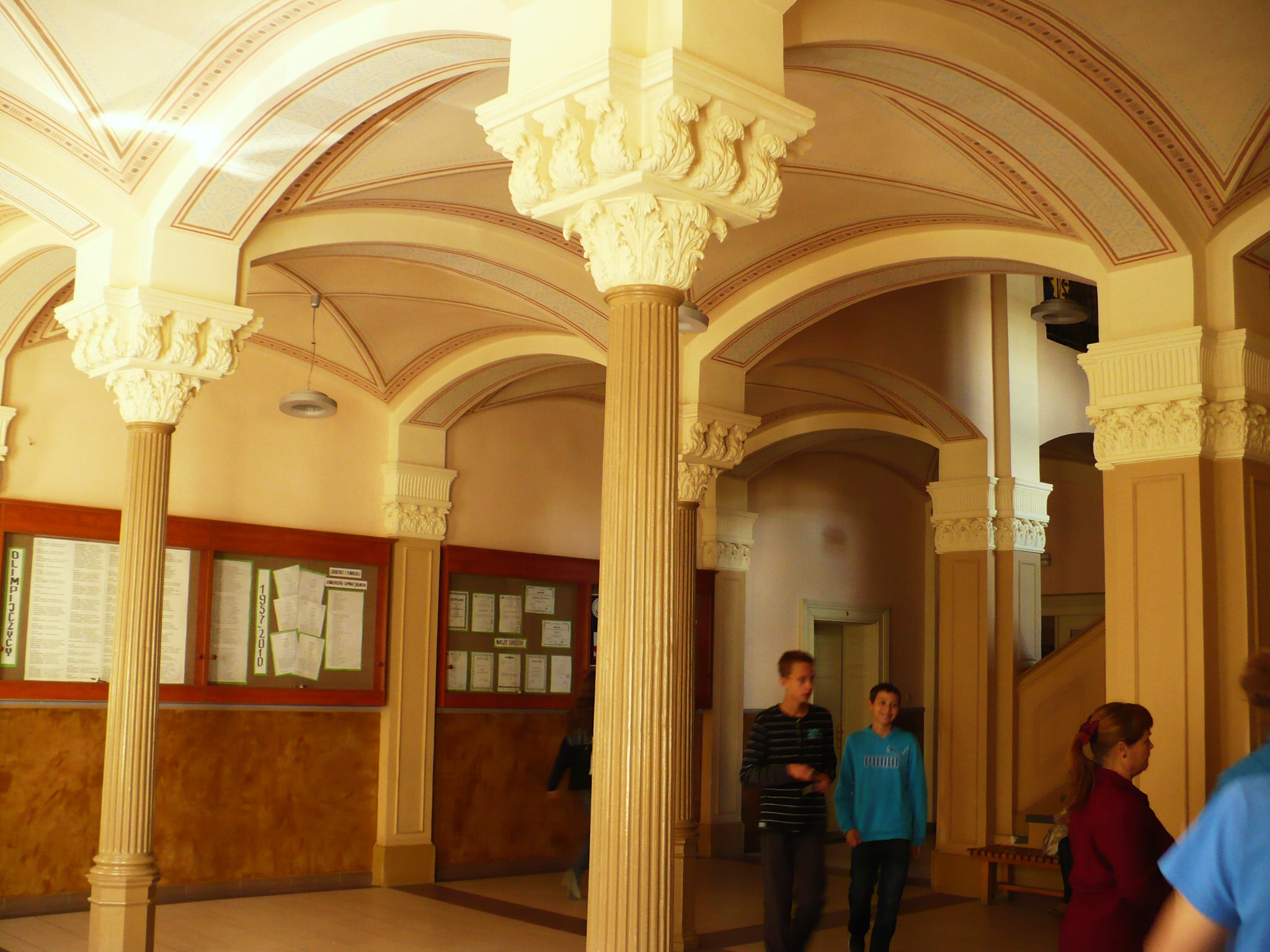
Detail of inside decoration

Freedom Monument

Built in 1945, by Jan Kossowski: Functionalism. Demolished in July 2026.

Monument to the fallen Soviet and Polish soldiers during the fighting for the liberation of the city in January 1945. It commemorates also the return of Bydgoszcz to Polish territory, on 20 January 1920. Design by Jan Kossowski as the "Monument of Gratitude to Soldiers of the Red Army". It was intended to be a temporary monument, pending the construction of more worthy project object, but this never happened. In 1990, it was renamed "Freedom Monument". In May 2025, the overall state of preservation of the monument was judged unsustainable and its demolition was included in the overall project of revitalization of the square. A competition for the erection of a new monument is planned to start during the third quarter of 2026.

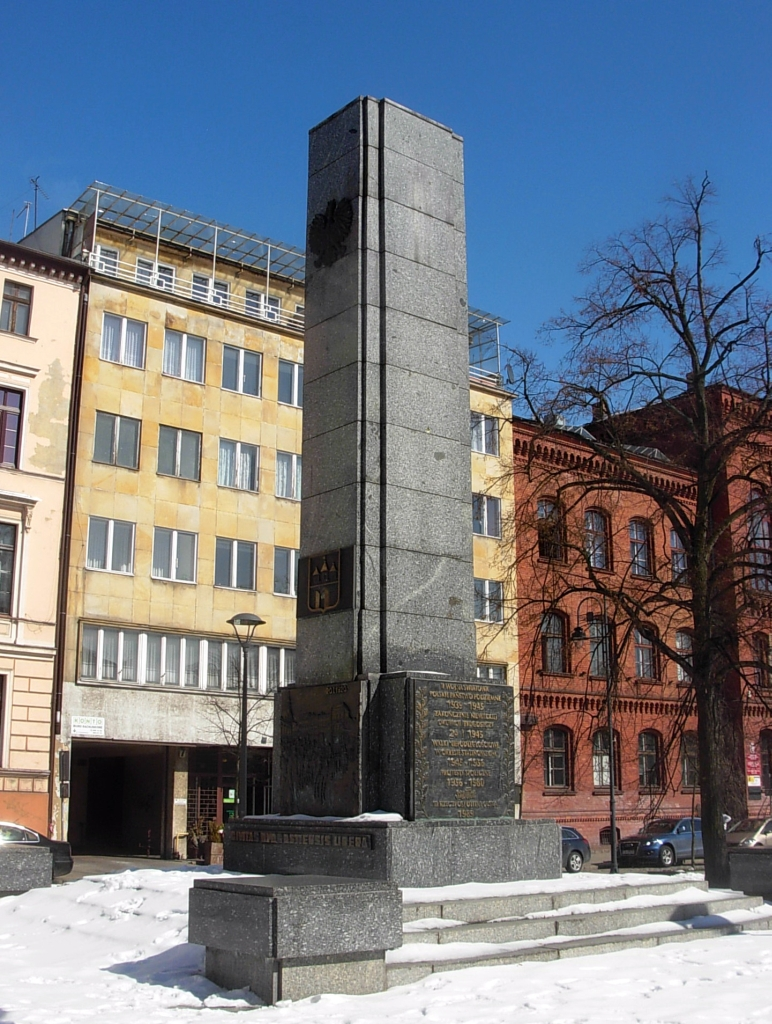
Freedom Monument

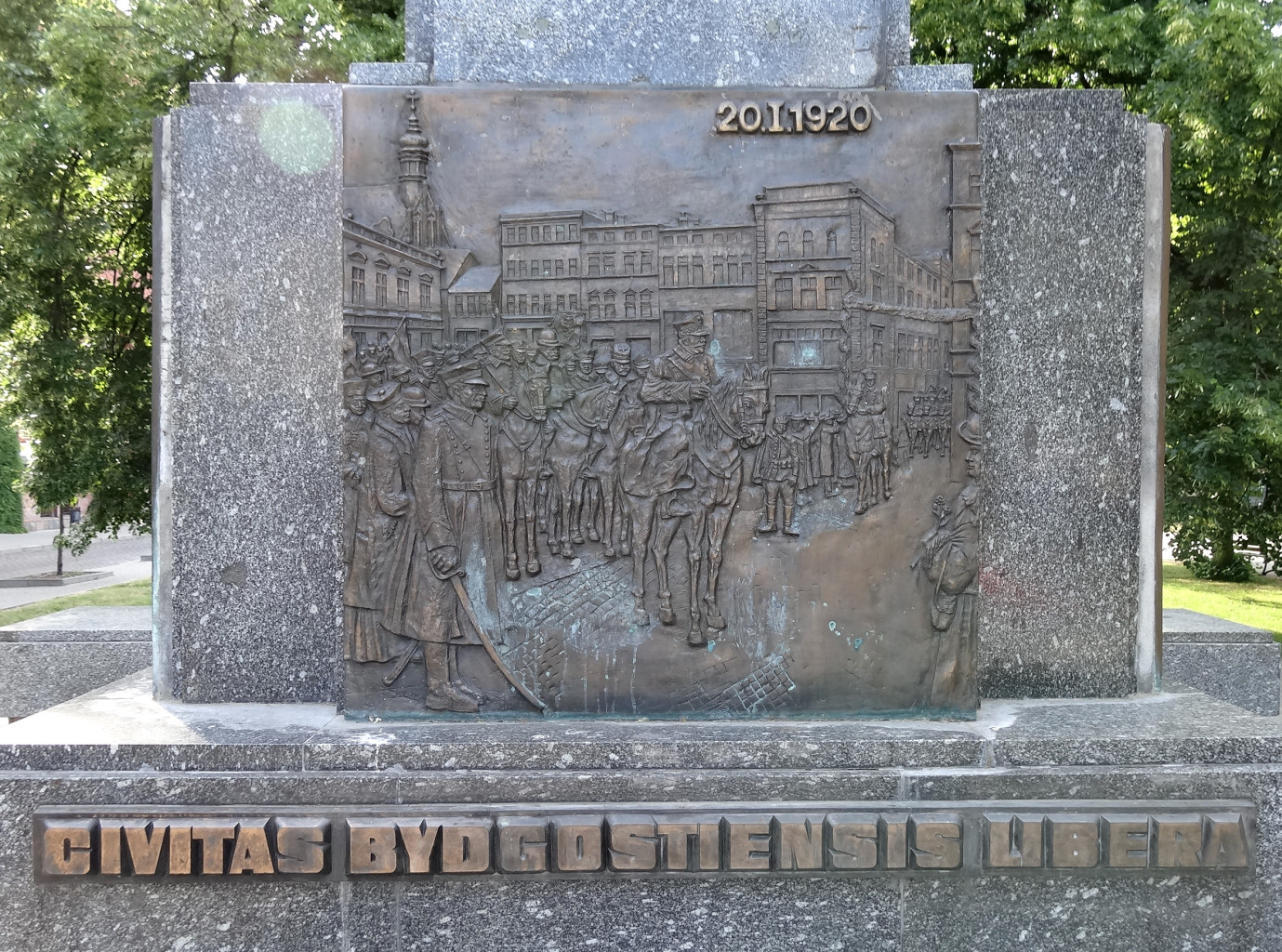
one of the plaques on the monument, commemorating the return of Bydgoszcz to the Polish territory.

Fountain "The Deluge"

Built in 1904, by Ferdinand Lepcke: Classicism.

One of the most original sculptures in Poland, it was an ornament in Bydgoszcz during the interwar period. Its designer was the Berlin sculptor Ferdinand Lepcke, also the author of Bydgoszcz Archer ("Łuczniczka"). The three-part sculpture depicted the people and animals trying to save themselves from the biblical flood. Water gushed fountains, reaching up to 6 m in height. In 1943, Nazis melted part of it for war purposes. Between 2004 and 2014, the original fountain was reconstructed by private fundings. Another fountain (built in 1906) of the same artist is still standing in the Rose Garden, Coburg.

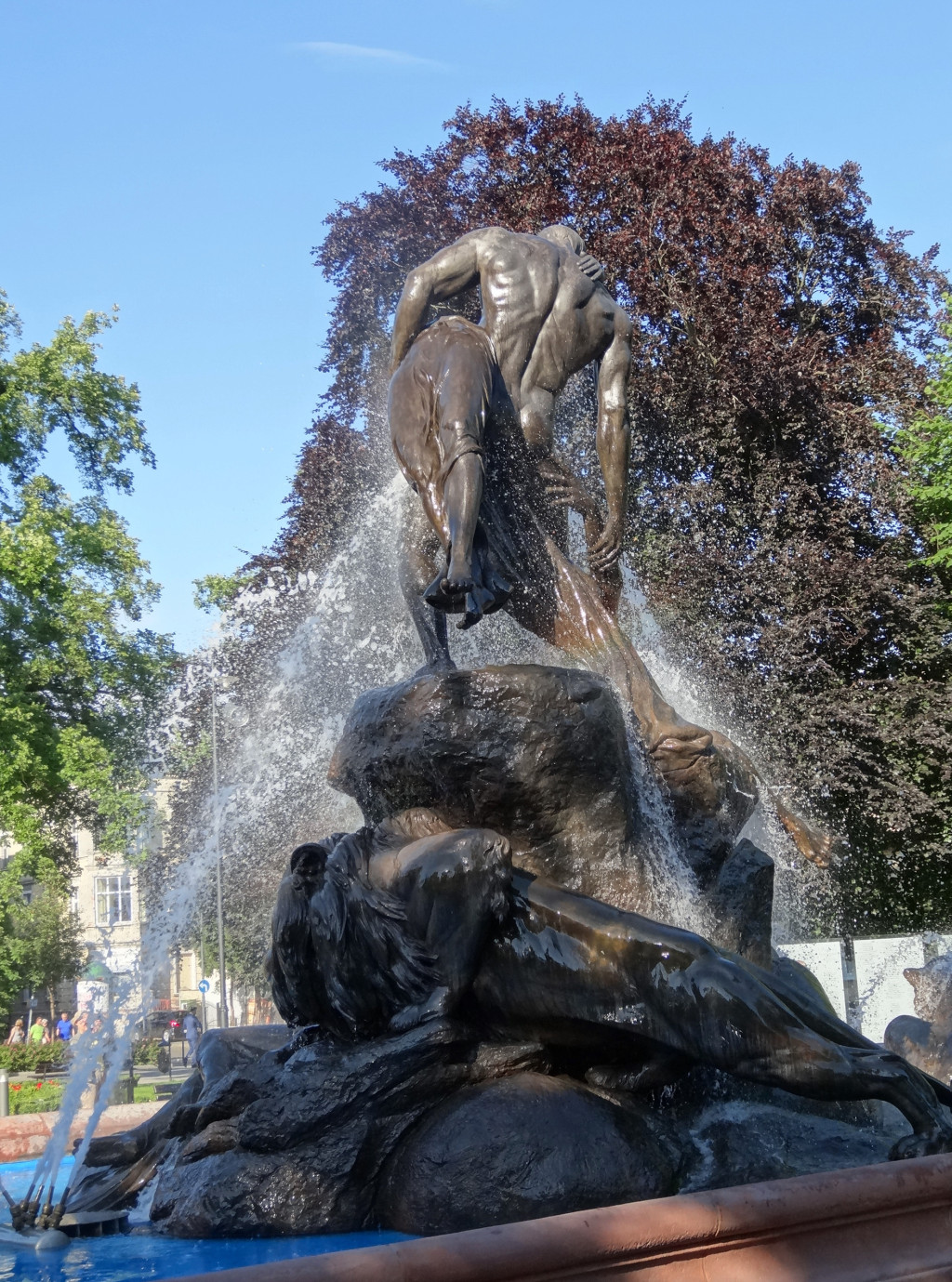
Global view of the fountain

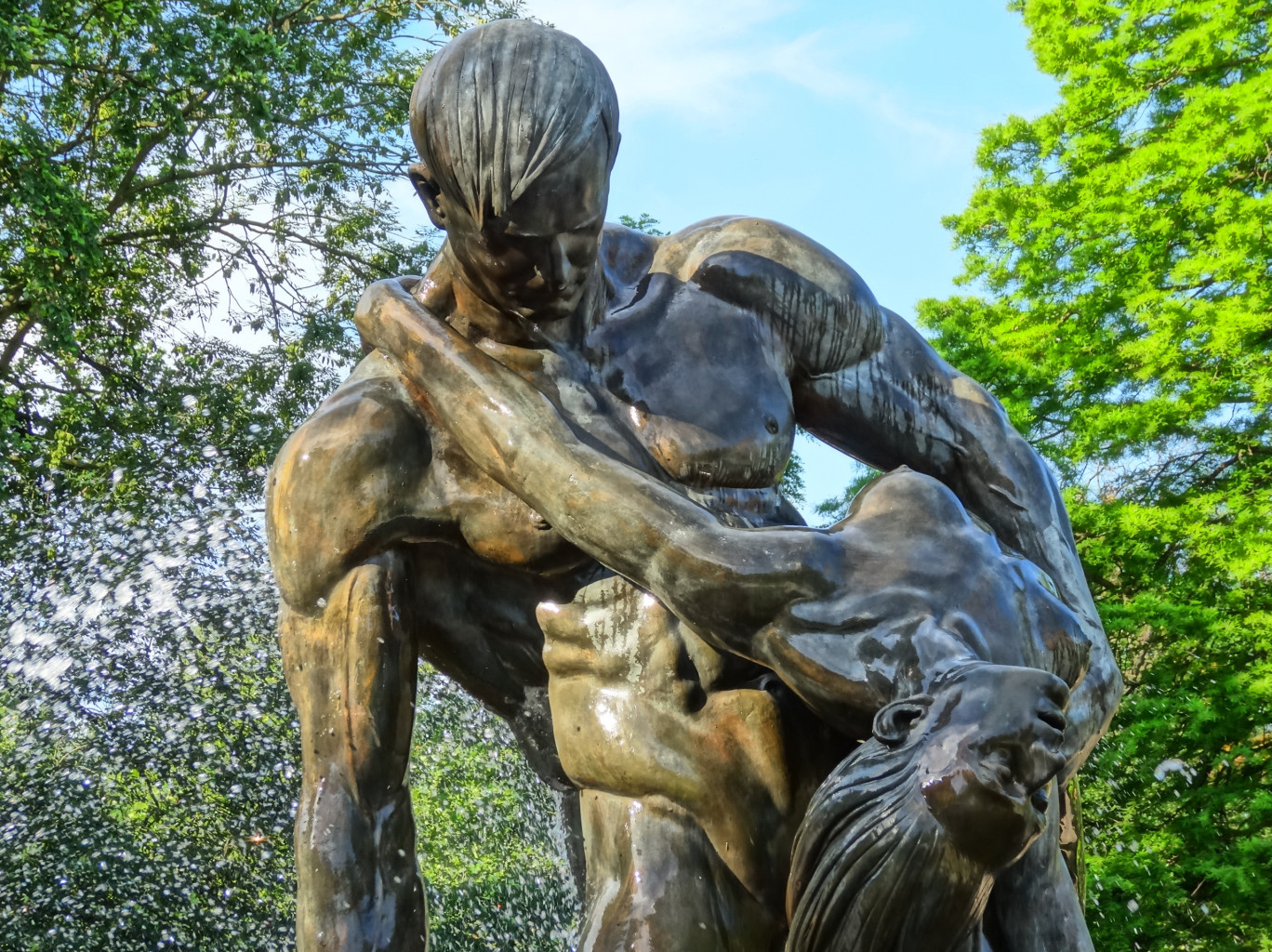
Detail of the characters

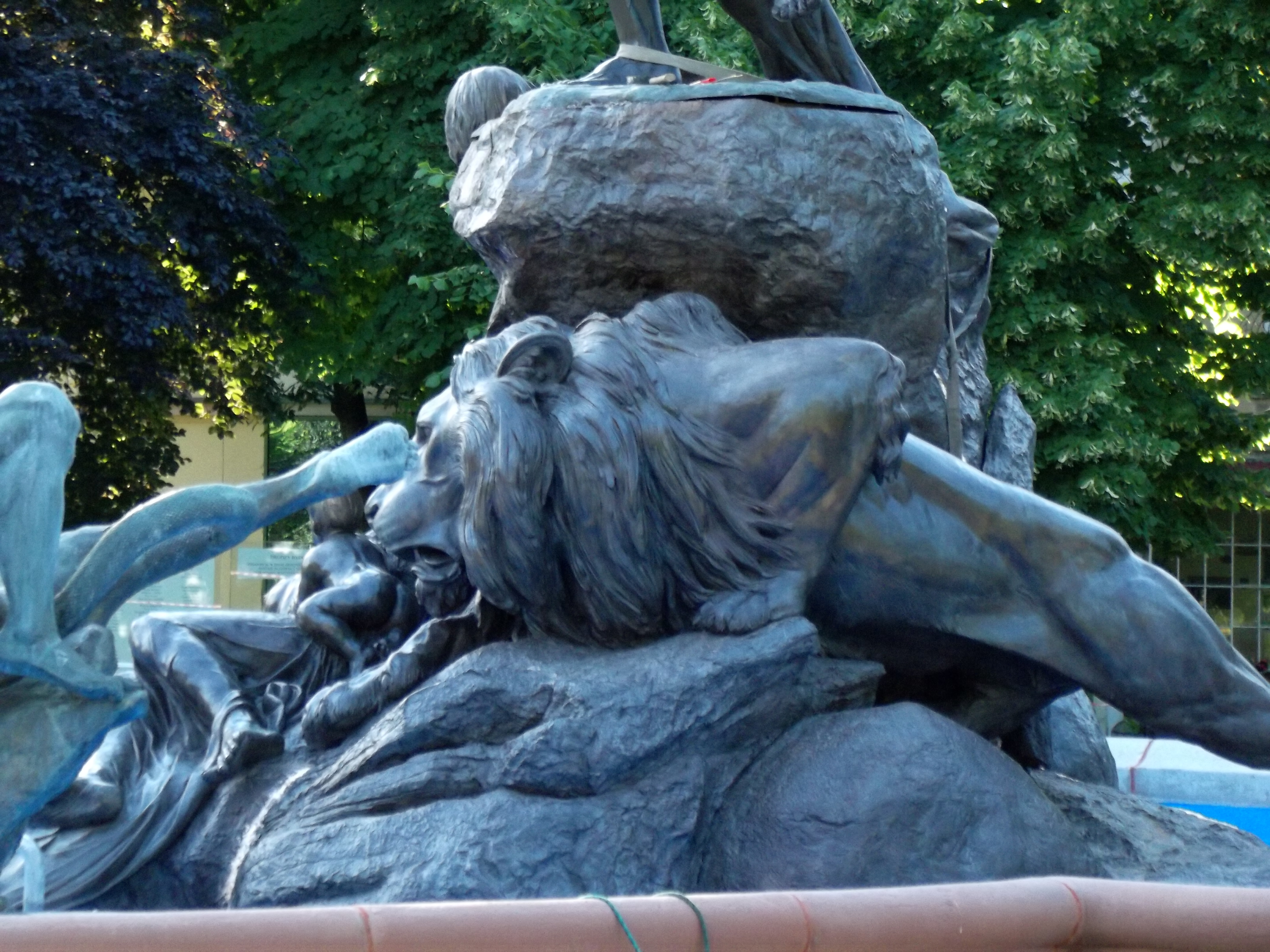
Detail of the base

== Miscellaneous ==
On the square grows a planetree registered on the Polish Natural Monument list: this 346 cm trunk circumference tree stands beside St Peter's and St Paul's Church.

In the immediate vicinity of High School Nr.1, at Gimnazjalna Street 2a, stands a neoclassical building built in 1865. During interwar was located there a private clinic for nervous diseases run by Dr. Króla. It served as a military hospital during World War II, and from 1975 to 1993 it was a pulmonary diseases clinic with an X-ray laboratory.

Here also grows a Ginkgo biloba, listed as Polish Natural Monuments.

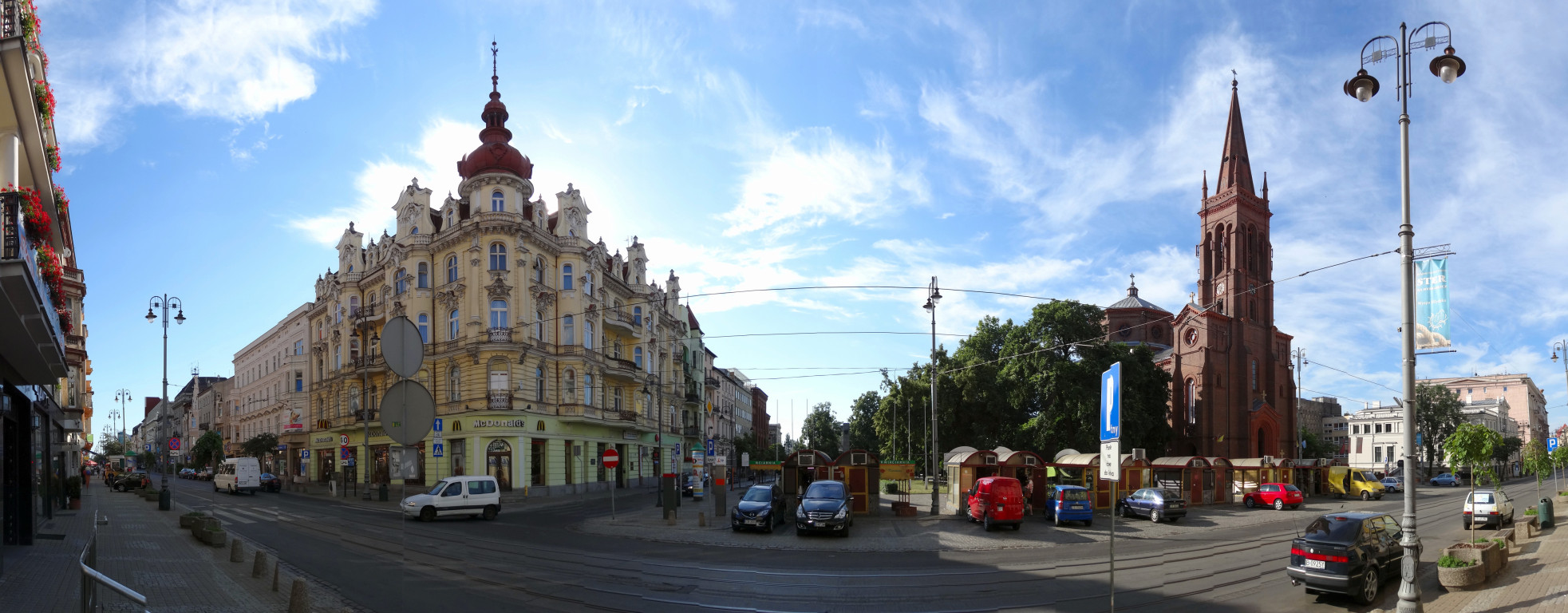
Freedom Square view from Gdanska Street

== See also ==
- Bydgoszcz
- Deluge Fountain
- Father Stanisław Konarski Street in Bydgoszcz
- Freedom Monument in Bydgoszcz
- Gdanska Street in Bydgoszcz
- High School No. 1 in Bydgoszcz
- Park Casimir the Great Bydgoszcz
- St Peter's and St Paul's Church in Bydgoszcz
- Tenement at Freedom Square 1, Bydgoszcz

== Bibliography ==
- (in Polish) Daria Bręczewska-Kulesza, Bogna Derkowska-Kostkowska, A. Wysocka (2003). Ulica Gdańska. Przewodnik historyczny. Bydgoszcz: Wojewódzki Ośrodek Kultury w Bydgoszczy. ISBN 9788386970100.
- (in Polish) Derenda, Jerzy (2006). Piękna stara Bydgoszcz, t. I z serii Bydgoszcz, miasto na Kujawach. Bydgoszcz: warzystwo Miłośników Miasta Bydgoszczy. ISBN 9788391617816.
- (in Polish) Derenda, Jerzy (2008). Bydgoszcz w blasku symboli, t. II z serii Bydgoszcz, miasto na Kujawach. Bydgoszcz: warzystwo Miłośników Miasta Bydgoszczy. ISBN 9788391617816.
- (in Polish) Jastrzębska-Puzowska, Iwona. Od miasteczka do metropolii. Rozwój architektoniczny i urbanistyczny Bydgoszczy w latach 1850-1920. Bydgoszcz.
- (in Polish) Romaniuk, Marek (1999). Pomnik konny cesarza Wilhelma I w Bydgoszczy. Materiały do dziejów kultury i sztuki Bydgoszczy i regionu, z. 4. Bydgoszcz: Pracownia Dokumentacji i Popularyzacji Zabytków Wojewódzkiego Ośrodka Kultury w Bydgoszczy. pp. 11–14.
- (in Polish) Umiński, Janusz (1996). Bydgoszcz. Przewodnik. Bydgoszcz: Regionalny Oddział PTTK "Szlak Brdy".
- (in Polish) Urbański, Dawid (2012). Plac Wolności. Kalendarz Bydgoski. Bydgoszcz: Towarzystwo Miłośników Miasta Bydgoszczy.
