= Tahrir Square (disambiguation) =

Tahrir Square (Arabic: ميدان التحرير, Mīdān at-Taḥrīr, lit: Liberation Square) is a major public town square in downtown Cairo, Egypt.

Tahrir Square may also refer to:

- Tahrir Square, Alexandria, Egypt
- Tahrir Square, Baghdad, Iraq
- Tahrir Square, Damascus, Syria; on Baghdad Street
- Tahrir Square, Sanaa, Yemen

== See also ==
- Liberation Square (disambiguation)
