= Freedom Square, Batumi =

Central square in Batumi, Adjara, Georgia

Coordinates: 41°38′45″N 41°38′30″E

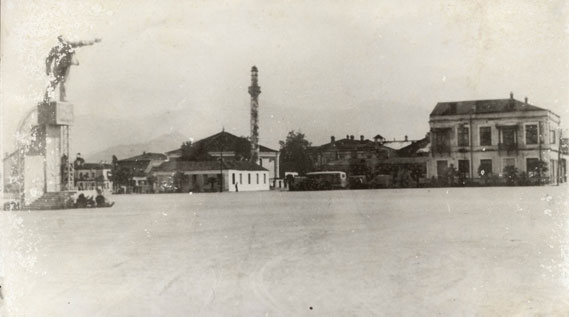

Freedom Square (Georgian: თავისუფლების მოედანი, tavisuplebis moedani) is a central square in Batumi, Georgia’s autonomous republic of Adjara. It is adjacent to Batumi's Black Sea port.

In the 19th century, the square was known as Aziziye Square after the cathedral mosque which stood there. Under the Soviet Union, the mosque was demolished and the square was renamed after Vladimir Lenin to whom a statue was erected there. After Georgia became independent again, the Lenin statue was removed and the square briefly bore President Zviad Gamsakhurdia’s name early in the 1990s. A common grave of the Georgian soldiers who fell fighting the Turkish troops in March 1921 was discovered in the vicinity of the square.
