= Martyrs' Square =

Martyrs' Square may refer to:

- Martyrs' Square, Brussels, Belgium
- Piazza dei Martiri, a martyrs' monument square in Naples, Italy
- Martyrs' Square, Tehran, Iran, previously known as Jaleh Square
- Martyrs' Square, Beirut, Lebanon
- Martyrs' Square, Tripoli, Libya, known historically by the names Green Square, Independence Square, and Piazza Italia
- Place des Martyrs, Luxembourg, a garden square in Luxembourg City, Luxembourg
- Martyrs' Square, Nablus, Palestine
- Martyrs' Square, Damascus, a.k.a. Marjeh Square, Syria
- Martyrs' Square, on Quwatli Street in Homs, Syria
