= Freedom Square, Nikšić =

Square in Nikšić, Montenegro

Coordinates: 42.773696°N 18.948545°E

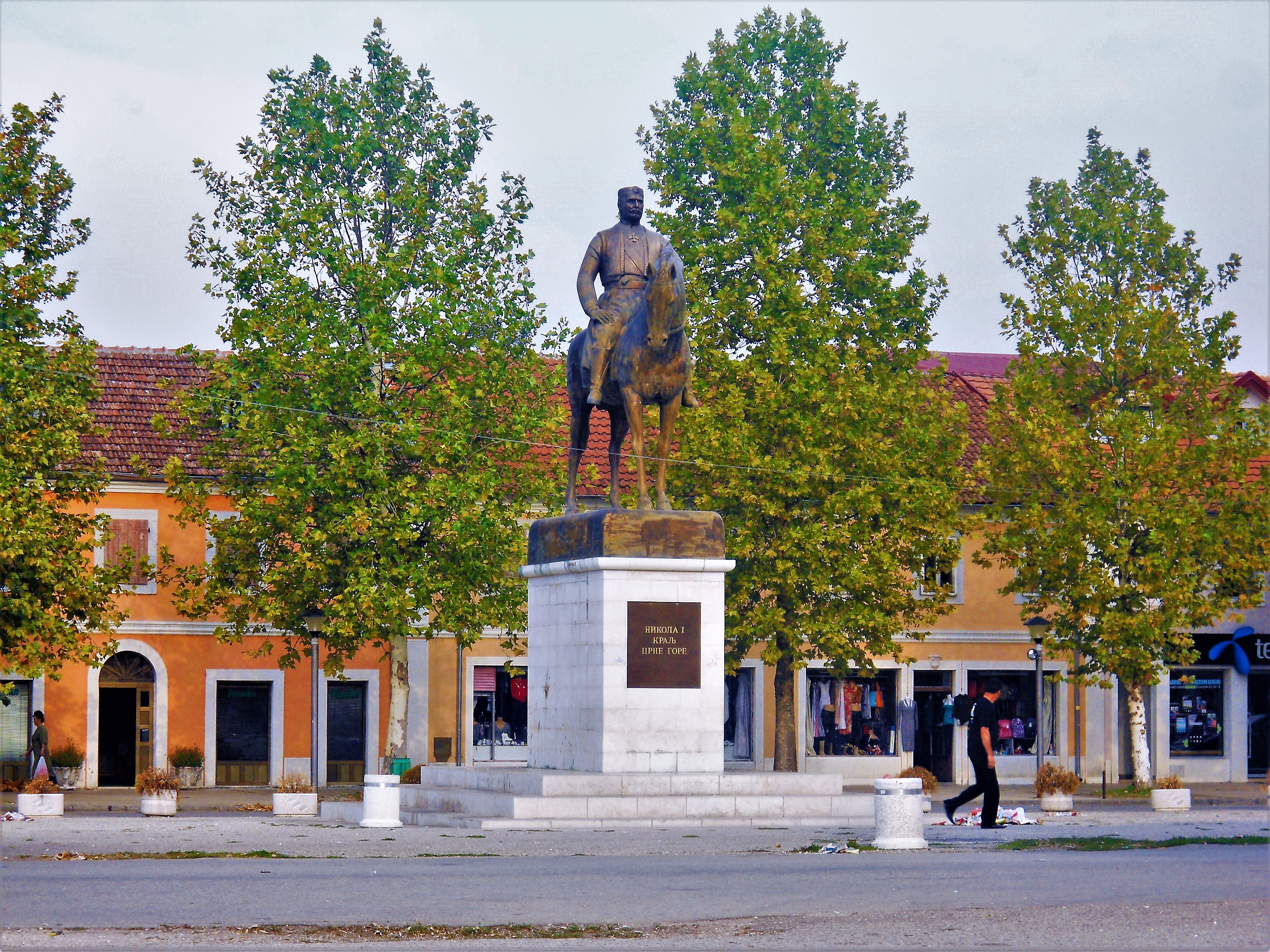
The monument to King Nicholas I

Freedom Square or Liberty Square (Serbian Cyrillic: Трг Слободе, romanized: Trg Slobode) is the main town square in Nikšić, Montenegro. It's the largest town square in the country. Numerous cafés and restaurants are located in the square, as well as many stores, banks and an art gallery. It also serves as one of the main concert venues in the city.

== History ==
The urban plan for the city was commissioned by King Nicholas in 1883, and designed by Josip Slade, an architect from Trogir, Croatia. Trg Slobode was modeled on the Versailles square - there is one main street passing through it (Njegoševa street), and four other streets leading to the square. The square has a large fountain, colloquially called the Swan Lake (Montenegrin: Labudovo jezero Лабудово језеро), built in 2004.

On May 9, 2006, the Victory Day over Fascism, a large monument to King Nicholas was uncovered by President Filip Vujanović. The author of the monument is Miodrag Živković, a sculptor from Belgrade. The monument's total height is 9.15 metres, and the bronze sculpture of King Nicholas itself weighs 5 tonnes.
