= Independence (disambiguation) =

Independence generally refers to the self-government of a nation, country, or state by its residents and population.

Independence may also refer to:

== Mathematics ==
- Algebraic independence
- Independence (graph theory), edge-wise non-connectedness
- Independence (mathematical logic), logical independence
- Independence (probability theory), statistical independence
- Linear independence

== Films ==
- Independence (1976 film), a docudrama directed by John Huston
- Independence (1999 film), an Indian film in Malayalam

== Music ==
- Independence (Lulu album), 1993
- Independence (Kosheen album), 2012

== Naval ships ==
- Independence class (disambiguation), several classes of ships
- USS Independence, any of seven US Navy ships
- Texan schooner Independence, an 1832 ship in the Texas Navy during the Texas Revolution

== Populated Places ==
=== United States ===
- Independence County, Arkansas
- Independence, California, a census-designated place in Inyo County
- Independence, Calaveras County, California, an unincorporated community
- Independence, Pitkin County, Colorado, a ghost town
- Independence, Indiana, an unincorporated community
- Independence, Iowa, a city
- Independence, Kansas, a city
- Independence, Kentucky, a home rule-class city
- Independence, Louisiana, a town
- Independence, Minnesota, a city in Hennepin County
- Independence, St. Louis County, Minnesota, an unincorporated community
- Independence, Mississippi, an unincorporated community
- Independence, Missouri, a city
- Independence, New York, a town
- Independence, Ohio, a city in Cuyahoga County
- Independence, Defiance County, Ohio, an unincorporated community in Defiance County, Ohio
- Independence, Oklahoma, a ghost town
- Independence, Oregon, a city
- Independence, Tennessee, an unincorporated community
- Independence, Texas, an unincorporated community
- Independence, Utah, a town
- Independence, Virginia, a town
- Independence, Barbour County, West Virginia, an unincorporated community
- Independence, Clay County, West Virginia, an unincorporated community
- Independence, Jackson County, West Virginia, an unincorporated community
- Independence, Preston County, West Virginia, an unincorporated community
- Independence, Washington, an unincorporated community
- Independence, Wisconsin, a city
- Independence County, Washington, a proposed county
- Independence Township (disambiguation)
- Lake Independence (disambiguation), various American lakes (and one constituency in Belize)
- Independence River, a tributary of the Black River in New York
- Independence Lake (Colorado)
- Independence Lakes, a number of lakes in Idaho
- Lake Independence (Michigan)
- Lake Independence (Jackson County, Minnesota)
- Independence National Historical Park, in Philadelphia, Pennsylvania
- Independence Rock (Wyoming)
- Fort Independence (disambiguation)
- Mount Independence (disambiguation)

=== Elsewhere ===
- Independence and Mango Creek, adjacent villages (considered as one community) in Belize
- Independence, a former name of Niulakita, Tuvalu
- Independence Fjord, Greenland

== Streams ==
- Independence Creek, a creek in west Texas
- Independence Creek (Sierra County, California), a tributary of the Little Truckee River in Sierra County and Nevada County, California

== Transportation ==
- SS Independence, an American passenger ship (built 1951)
- Independence (cruise ship), a small cruise ship (built 2010)
- FSRU Independence, a 2014 floating LNG storage and regasification unit
- Independence (schooner), a 35-ton schooner
- Independence Air, an American low-cost airline
- Independence Airport (disambiguation)
- Independence (Amtrak station), in Independence, Missouri, US
- Chevrolet Series AE Independence, an American automobile introduced in 1931
- Independence Avenue (disambiguation), in various countries
- Independence Paragliding, a German paraglider manufacturer
- Independence 20, an American sailboat design for disabled sailors
- Independence (fireboat), operated in Philadelphia, since 2007
- Independence (aircraft), US presidential transport in the 1940s and 1950s

== Schools ==
- Independence Community College, in Independence, Kansas, US
- Independence High School (disambiguation)
- Baltimore Independence School, a public charter high school in Baltimore, Maryland, US
- Independence Middle School (Jupiter, Florida), US
- Independence Middle School (Independence, Ohio), US

== Sports teams ==
- Charlotte Independence, an American soccer team based in Charlotte, North Carolina
- Philadelphia Independence, a former American soccer team based in Chester, Pennsylvania

== Other uses ==
- Independence Blue Cross, an American health insurer
- Independence Power Plant, near Newark, Arkansas
- Ulmus americana 'Independence', an American Elm cultivar
- Independence (Israeli political party), a political party in Israel
- Space Shuttle Independence, full-scale, high-fidelity replica of the Space Shuttle
- Independence Ogunewe, Nigerian politician (1960–2018)

== See also ==
- Independence Party (disambiguation)
- Independence Bowl, an annual American college football game
- Independence College (disambiguation)
- Independence Stadium (disambiguation)
- Independence Square (disambiguation)
- Independence Plaza (disambiguation)
- Independence Hall (disambiguation)
- Independence Mall (disambiguation)
- Independence Centre (disambiguation)
- Palace of Independence (disambiguation)
- Independencia (disambiguation)
- Independência (disambiguation)
- Indépendance, proper name of the exoplanet HD 1502 b
