= Independencia =

Independencia is the Spanish word for independence. It may refer to:

== Places ==
- Independencia, Chile
- Independencia, Cochabamba or Ayopaya, a town in Cochabamba Department, Bolivia
- Independencia Province, Dominican Republic
- La Independencia, Chiapas, Mexico
- Independencia, Monterrey, Nuevo León, Mexico
- Independencia, Paraguay
- Villa Independencia, original name of Fray Bentos, Uruguay
- Independencia District (disambiguation)
- Independencia Municipality (disambiguation)

== Ships ==
- Chilean corvette Independencia (1818)
- Independencia (1843), Yucetechan naval schooner in the Naval Battle of Campeche
- Independencia (Peruvian ship) (1865), Peruvian ironclad, wrecked and blew up in 1879 during the War of the Pacific
- Independencia (1874), ironclad for Brazil whose bungled launch led to bankruptcy of J & W Dudgeon shipbuilders. Subsequently became HMS Neptune
- ARA Independencia (1891), Argentine coastal ship
- ARA Independencia (1958), Argentine aircraft carrier
- USCGC Icarus (WPC-110) (1932), transferred to the Navy of the Dominican Republic and renamed Independencia
- P163 Independencia, an Oaxaca-class patrol vessel of the Mexican Navy
- Brazilian frigate Independência, a Niterói-class frigate

== Other uses ==
- Independencia (film), a 2009 Filipino film
- Independencia station (Mendoza), a light train station in Mendoza, Argentina
- Independencia (Line C Buenos Aires Underground), a metro station in Argentina
- Independencia (Line E Buenos Aires Underground), a metro station in Argentina
- Independencia metro station (Guadalajara), a metro station in Guadalajara, Mexico
- Independence (short film), a 1997 Paraguayan short film
- La Independencia, 1966 album by Argentine singer Jorge Cafrune

== See also ==
- Independência (disambiguation), Portuguese for "independence"
- Independencia Department (disambiguation)
- Independence (disambiguation)
