= Independence Plaza =

Office building in Midland, Texas

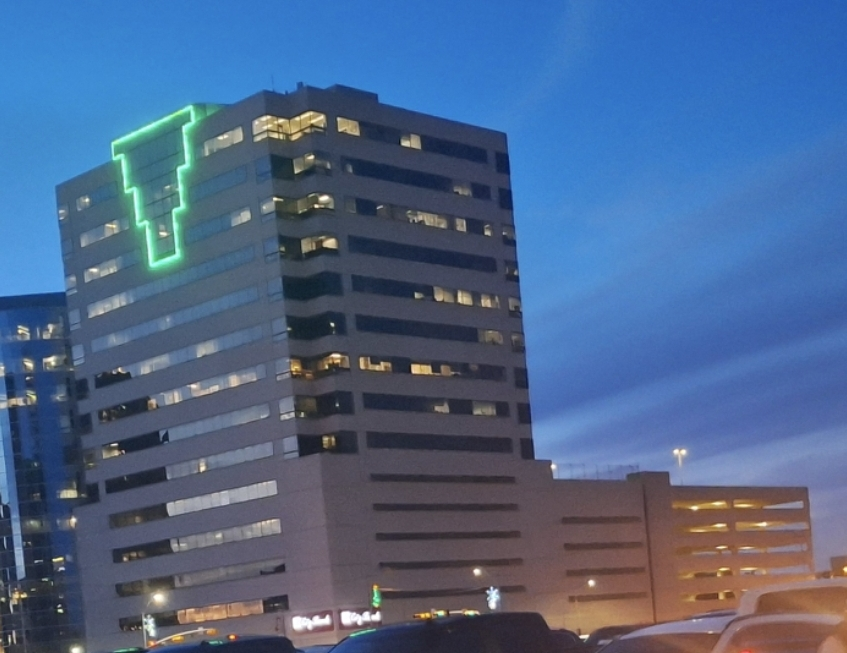
- Interactive map of the Independence Plaza area

Record height
- Preceded by: Pure Resources Tower
- Surpassed by: Centennial Tower

General information
- Status: Completed
- Type: Mixed Office Space
- Location: 400 W. Illinois; Midland, Texas
- Coordinates: 31.999523°N 102.078117°W
- Construction started: 1982
- Completed: 1984
- Opening: 1984

Height
- Top floor: 16

Technical details
- Floor count: 16
- Floor area: 160,000 sq ft (15,000 m^{2})

Other information
- Parking: Attached parking garage

Independence Plaza is a highrise office building located in downtown Midland, Texas. It is the city's fourth tallest building after the Bank of America Building, the Wilco Building and Centennial Tower. Floors two through seven are parking garage in the building and floors eight through 16 are office. The building also has a seven-level parking garage attached to it on its north side. Independence Plaza was constructed during Midland's building boom when the city experienced rapid growth and a need for office space in the early 80's due to an oil boom. Today, a local bank occupies the lobby of the building and various companies are tenants on floors eight through sixteen.

== See also ==
- List of tallest buildings in Midland, Texas
