= Independence Hall (disambiguation) =

Independence Hall is a historic building in Philadelphia, Pennsylvania, United States.

Independence Hall can also refer to:

- Independence Hall (Israel), in Tel Aviv, Israel
- Independence Hall of Korea, a history museum in Cheonam, South Korea
- Independence Commemoration Hall (Sri Lanka), in Colombo, Sri Lanka
- West Virginia Independence Hall, Wheeling, West Virginia, United States

== See also ==
- Palace of Independence (disambiguation)
- Independence Square (disambiguation)
- Independence Centre (disambiguation)
- Independence Plaza (disambiguation)
- Independence Mall (disambiguation)
- Independence (disambiguation)
