= Independence School =

Independence School may refer to:

- Independence High School (disambiguation)
- Baltimore Independence School, a public charter high school in Baltimore, Maryland
- Independence Middle School (Jupiter, Florida)
- Independence Middle School (Independence, Ohio)

== See also ==
- Independence Community College, Independence, Kansas
