= Independence Centre =

Independence Centre or variation may refer to:

- Independence Center, Independence, Missouri, US; a shopping mall
- Independence Center (St. Louis), Missouri, US; a psychiatric rehabilitation center
- Independence Events Center, Independence, Missouri, US; a multipurpose arena
- Independence Visitor Center, Philadelphia, Pennsylvania, US
- 101 Independence Center, Charlotte, North Carolina, US; an office building

== See also ==
- Independence Mall (disambiguation)
- Independence Hall (disambiguation)
- Independence (disambiguation)
- Centre (disambiguation)
