= Independencia Municipality =

Independencia Municipality may refer to the following places in the Venezuela:

- Independencia Municipality, Anzoátegui
- Independencia Municipality, Miranda
- Independencia Municipality, Táchira
- Independencia Municipality, Yaracuy
