= KDCD-TV =

Midland, Texas; United States
- Channels: Analog: 18 (UHF)

Programming
- Affiliations: Independent station

Ownership
- Owner: Midland Telecasting Company

History
- First air date: January 1962
- Last air date: October 1974

Technical information
- ERP: 0.631 kW
- HAAT: 134 m (440 ft)
- Transmitter coordinates: 31°59′54″N 102°04′30″W

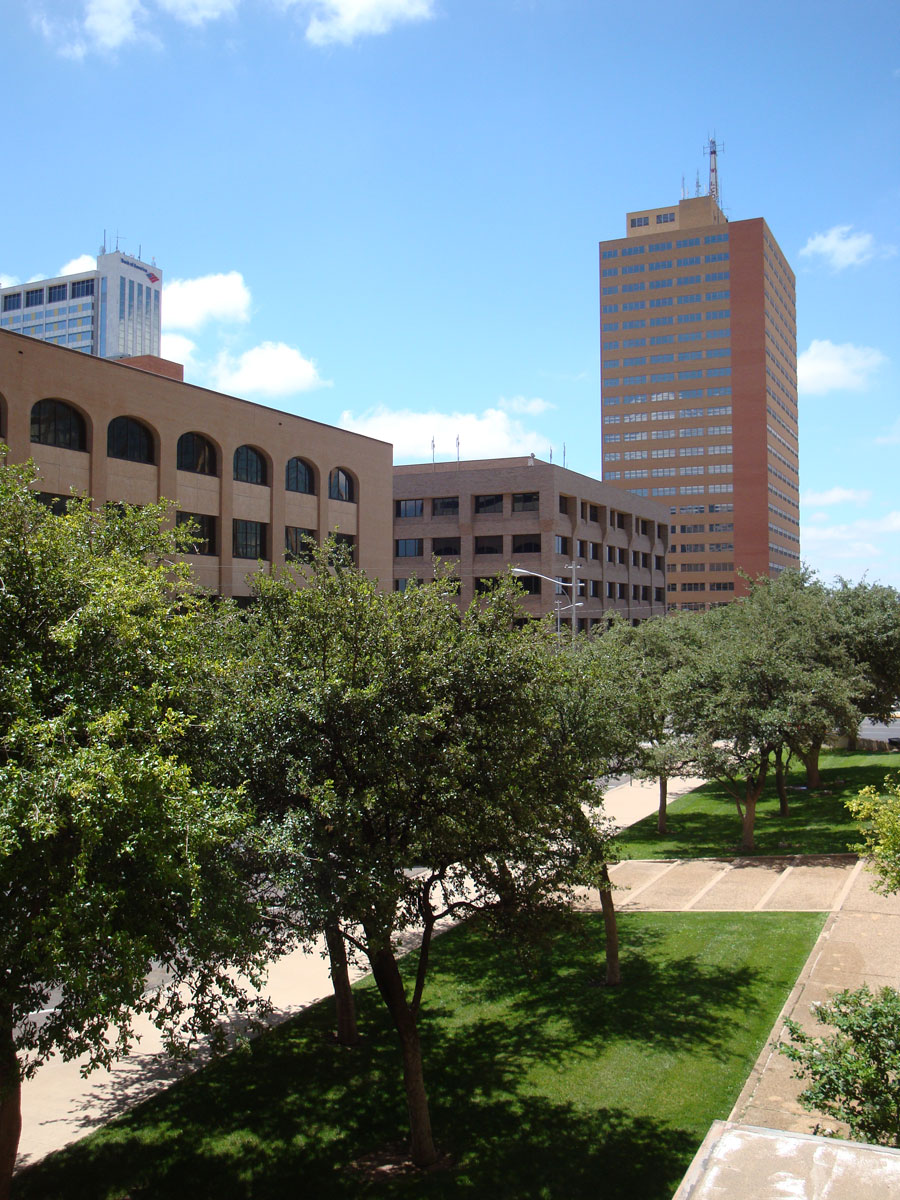
The Wilco Building (far right) served as KDCD-TV's transmitter site.

KDCD-TV (channel 18) was a television station in Midland, Texas, United States, owned by the Midland Telecasting Company. The station broadcast for three separate periods: briefly in January and February 1962; between June 8, 1969, and March 16, 1971; and from February 2, 1973, to either October 13, October 16, or November 15, 1974, though the construction permit remained on the books into the 1980s. An independent station without network affiliation for its entire run, KDCD-TV had an extremely low effective radiated power from its transmitter atop downtown Midland's Wilco Building. It struggled against a variety of economic headwinds.

== History ==
On September 12, 1960, the Midland Telecasting Company applied to the Federal Communications Commission (FCC) to build a new television station on ultra high frequency (UHF) channel 18 in Midland. The request was granted on May 13, 1961. Dalton Cobb, an independent oilman, was the president, and Chet Darwin was the manager. The station, KDCD-TV, initially promised a schedule of local, live programming.

The station announced its existence as an independent station, with an evening-only schedule, in a January 14, 1962, ad in the Midland Reporter-Telegram. Its first existence may have lasted less than a month. By February 7, the station was running advertising indicating it had suspended telecasting pending delivery of "better equipment" and promising a return to the air soon. The FCC's records state the station suspended operations on February 16, 1962.

During the first silence, KDCD attempted unsuccessfully to have the FCC assign a third regional very high frequency (VHF) channel, 10, to Midland. In 1967, Midland Telecasting became the plaintiff in a lawsuit against Cobb, seeking recovery of monies it received in a lawsuit settlement. Cobb admitted to taking the check for more than $44,000 and distributing the proceeds, including a personal payment of nearly $13,000 for what he claimed were related expenses. Midland Telecasting won the case against Cobb.

KDCD returned again to the air from June 8, 1969, to March 16, 1971, and again on February 2, 1973. Its technical facilities were unchanged; it broadcast with an effective radiated power of 740 watts, and its Grade B (secondary) signal contour extended no further than 10 miles (16 km) beyond the Wilco Building site. Darwin remained associated with the station and declared that it would largely utilize local programming. The station's last day of operation was listed in a 1976 FCC document as October 13, 1974, by the FCC's history cards as October 16, and in a 1982 lawsuit as November 15.

In May 1974, while KDCD was still operating, Midland Telecasting sued Midland–Odessa's three TV stations—KMID-TV, KOSA-TV, and KMOM-TV—as well as cable companies in Midland and Odessa—for antitrust damages. It alleged that the companies had scuttled a plan for KDCD-TV to use West Texas Microwave services to bring programs into the station at a rate of $475 a month, far less than the $17,975 a month charged by competitor Southwestern Bell. A 1976 countersuit for libel by Tall City Cable Co. in Midland noted that among the mentioned programs were Canadian Football League games and educational programming from KERA-TV in Dallas. The antitrust suit resulted in a license challenge to KMOM-TV and its sister stations, which in turn produced a distress sale of the set to minority-owned firms.

The Calvin Simmons Evangelistic Association and others contracted in 1981 to buy KDCD-TV from Chet Darwin for $350,000. The group had plans to petition for a newer, higher-power facility. Despite receiving FCC approval in February 1982, the deal never went through as the buyers refused to close the deal, and Midland Telecasting sued the buyers in May 1982 for $10 million. In 1984, the FCC designated a second deal to sell the station to Plains Television, Ltd., for comparative hearing against a new application for channel 18 by West Texas Communications. On May 14, 1985, the FCC granted the West Texas Communications application and dismissed the KDCD sale attempt.
