= Palace of Independence =

Palace of Independence or Independence Palace may refer to:

- Independence Palace, Ho Chi Minh City, Vietnam
- Independence Palace, Minsk, Belarus
- Palace of Independence (Astana), Kazakhstan
- Palácio da Independência, Lisbon, Portugal
- Saigon Governor's Palace, later renamed Independence Palace

== See also ==
- Independence (disambiguation)
- Independence Hall (disambiguation)
- Palace (disambiguation)
