= Santa Teresa del Tuy =

- City
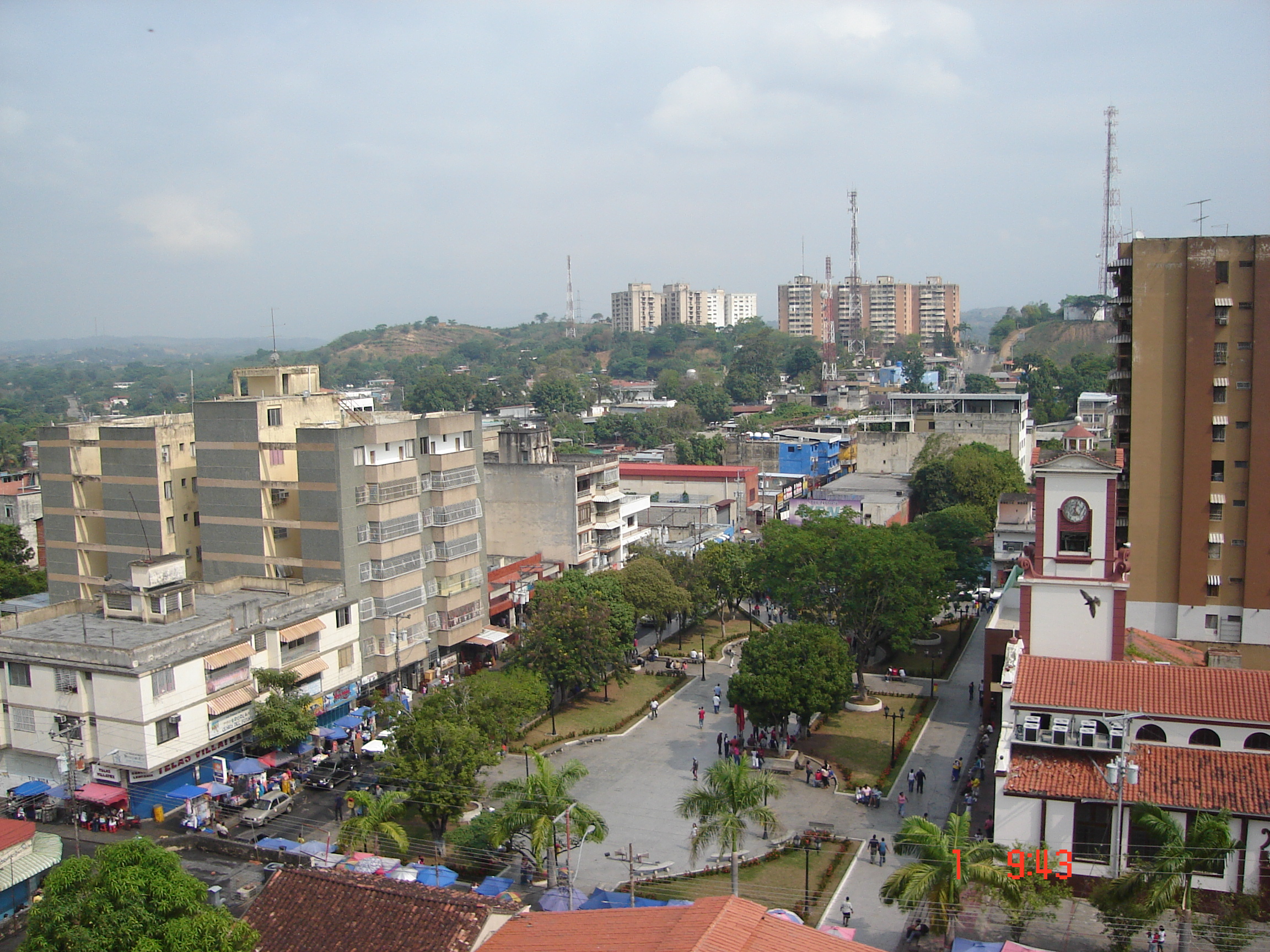

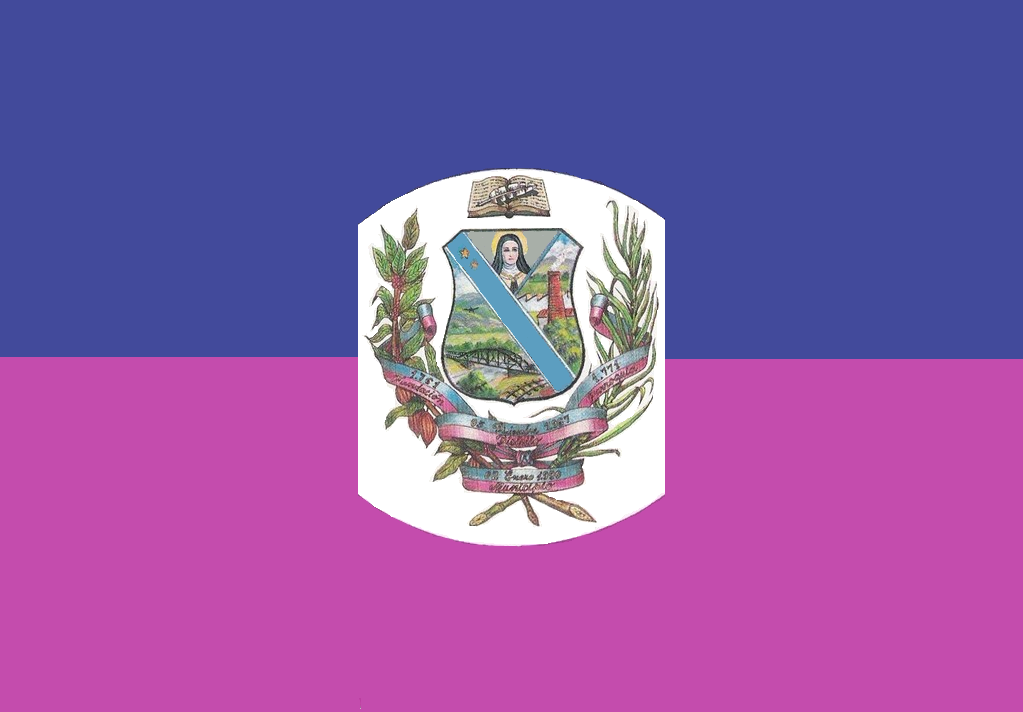
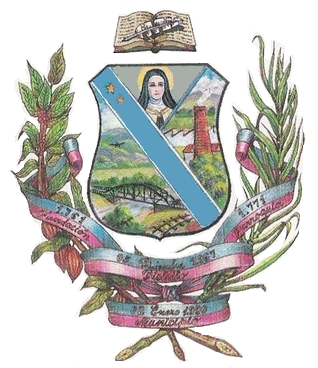
- Flag Coat of arms

- Location within Venezuela
- Coordinates: 10°14′0″N 66°39′50″W
- Country: Venezuela
- State: Miranda
- Municipality: Independencia Municipality
- Founded: 1761

Area
  - Total: 284 km^{2} (110 sq mi)
- Elevation: 160 m (520 ft)

Population (2005)
  - Total: 260,899
  - Demonym: tereseño/a
- Time zone: VST
- Postal code: 1215
- Area code: 0239
- Climate: Aw

Santa Teresa del Tuy (Spanish pronunciation: [ˈsanta teˈɾesa ðel ˈtuj]) is a city in the state of Miranda, Venezuela. It is the capital of Independencia Municipality.

== Notable people ==
- Edgardo Alfonzo, professional baseball player.
- Yoimer Camacho, professional baseball player.
- Felipe Lira, professional baseball player.
- Keider Montero, professional baseball player.
- Wilfredo Tovar, professional baseball player.
