= Independencia District =

Independencia District may refer to the following districts of Peru:

- Independencia District, Huaraz
- Independencia District, Vilcas Huamán
- Independencia District, Pisco
- Independencia District, Lima

== See also ==
- Independencia (disambiguation)
