= Fireboats of Philadelphia =

As a major port, the Philadelphia city government has operated multiple fireboats.

| image | name | launched | retired | gpm | notes |
|---|---|---|---|---|---|
| | Edwin S. Stuart | 1893 | ? | ? | named after one of Philadelphia's mayors. |
| | J. Hampton Moore | 1922 | ? | ? | named after one of Philadelphia's mayors. |
| | Bernard Samuel (fireboat) | | ? | ? | named after one of Philadelphia's mayors. |
| | Delaware | 1950 | | 6,000 | The Benjamin Franklin and the Delaware are sister ships.; Still in operation in 2015. |
| | Benjamin Franklin | 1950 | | 6,000 | The Benjamin Franklin and the Delaware are sister ships.; Still in operation in 2015. |
| | Independence | 2007 | | 7000 | Specially designed to be low enough to travel beneath key Philadelphia bridges.; Her largest water cannon is on a raisable mast, and is operated by remote control. |
