= Independent Township =

Independent Township may refer to one of the following places in the United States:

- Independent Township, Barton County, Kansas
- Independent Township, Valley County, Nebraska

== See also ==
- Independence Township (disambiguation)
