= Centennial Tower (Midland) =

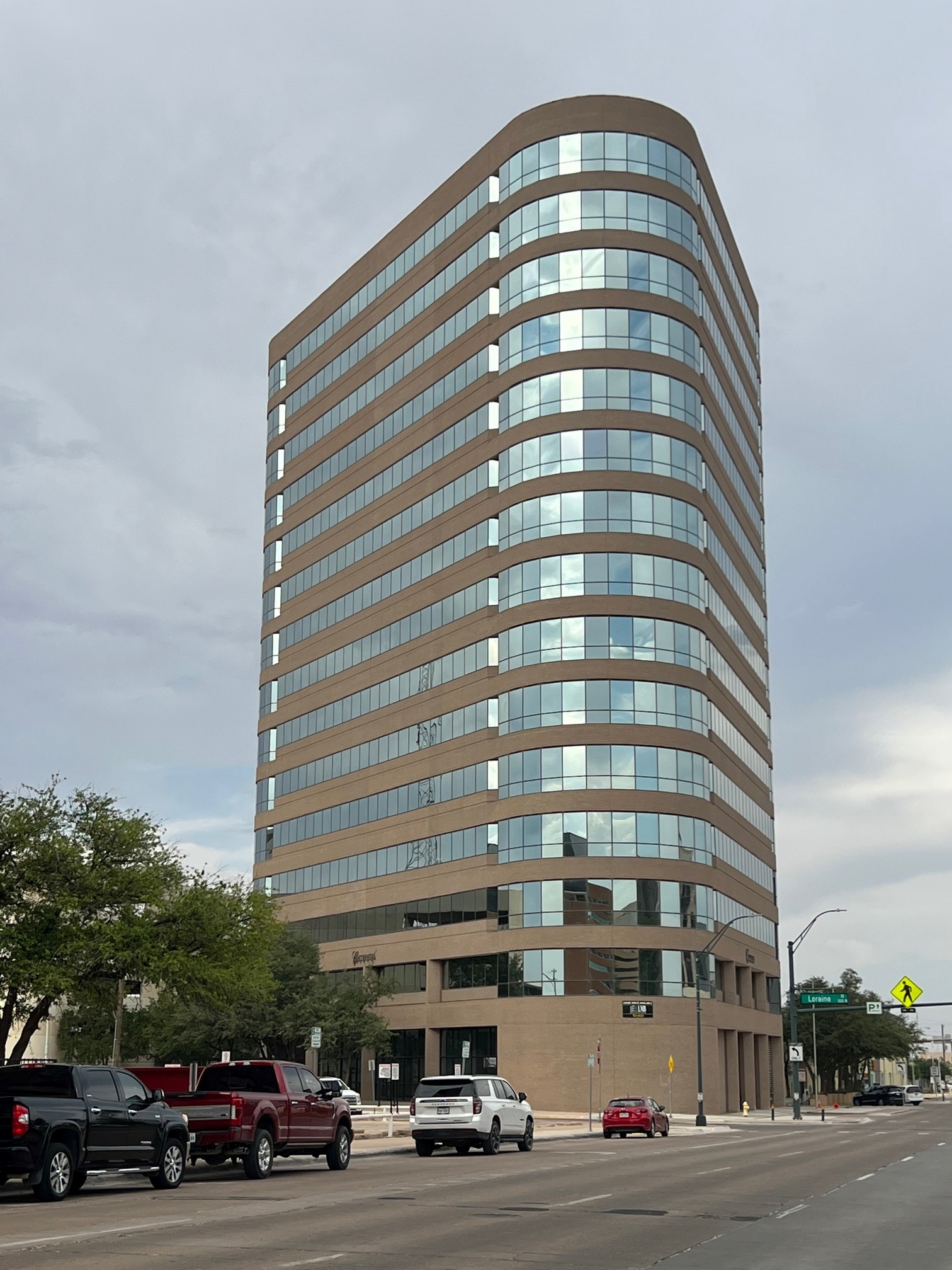
- Centennial Tower in Midland, Texas
- Interactive map of the Centennial Tower area

Record height
- Surpassed by: Wilco Building

General information
- Status: Completed
- Type: Office space
- Location: 200 N. Loraine St. Midland
- Coordinates: 31.998636°N 102.075563°W
- Construction started: 1978
- Completed: 1979
- Opening: 1979
- Owner: Jim Hightower

Height
- Roof: 191 feet (58 m)
- Top floor: 15

Technical details
- Floor count: 15
- Floor area: 184,900 sq ft (17,180 m^{2})

Other information
- Parking: Attached Multi-Level Parking Garage

Centennial Tower is a highrise building in Midland, Texas. The building stands at 15 stories and 191 feet (58 m). It is the third-tallest building in the city after the Bank of America Building and the Wilco Building.

== See also ==
- List of tallest buildings in Midland, Texas
