= Independência =

Independência (Portuguese meaning independence) may refer to:

== Places in Brazil ==
- Independência, Ceará, a municipality in the state of Ceará
- Independência, Rio Grande do Sul, a municipality in the state of Rio Grande do Sul
- Independência, Porto Alegre, a neighborhood in the city of Porto Alegre in the state of Rio Grande do Sul

== Other uses ==
- Independência Futebol Clube, a Brazilian football club
- Independência (album), a 1987 album by Brazilian rock band Capital Inicial

== See also ==
- Independence (disambiguation)
- Independencia (disambiguation), the Spanish word for independence
