= Independence Township =

Independence Township may refer to:

== Arkansas ==
- Independence Township, Baxter County, Arkansas, in Baxter County, Arkansas
- Independence Township, Lee County, Arkansas, in Lee County, Arkansas

== Illinois ==
- Independence Township, Saline County, Illinois

== Iowa ==
- Independence Township, Appanoose County, Iowa
- Independence Township, Hamilton County, Iowa
- Independence Township, Jasper County, Iowa
- Independence Township, Palo Alto County, Iowa

== Kansas ==
- Independence Township, Doniphan County, Kansas
- Independence Township, Montgomery County, Kansas, in Montgomery County, Kansas
- Independence Township, Osborne County, Kansas, in Osborne County, Kansas
- Independence Township, Washington County, Kansas, in Washington County, Kansas

== Michigan ==
- Independence Township, Michigan

== Missouri ==
- Independence Township, Dunklin County, Missouri
- Independence Township, Macon County, Missouri, in Macon County, Missouri
- Independence Township, Nodaway County, Missouri
- Independence Township, Schuyler County, Missouri

== Ohio ==
- Defunct townships of Cuyahoga County, Ohio
- Independence Township, Washington County, Ohio

== New Jersey ==
- Independence Township, New Jersey

== Pennsylvania ==
- Independence Township, Beaver County, Pennsylvania
- Independence Township, Washington County, Pennsylvania

== South Dakota ==
- Independence Township, Day County, South Dakota, in Day County, South Dakota
- Independence Township, Douglas County, South Dakota, in Douglas County, South Dakota

== See also ==
- Independent Township (disambiguation)
