= Edgardo Alfonzo =

Venezuelan baseball player (born 1973)

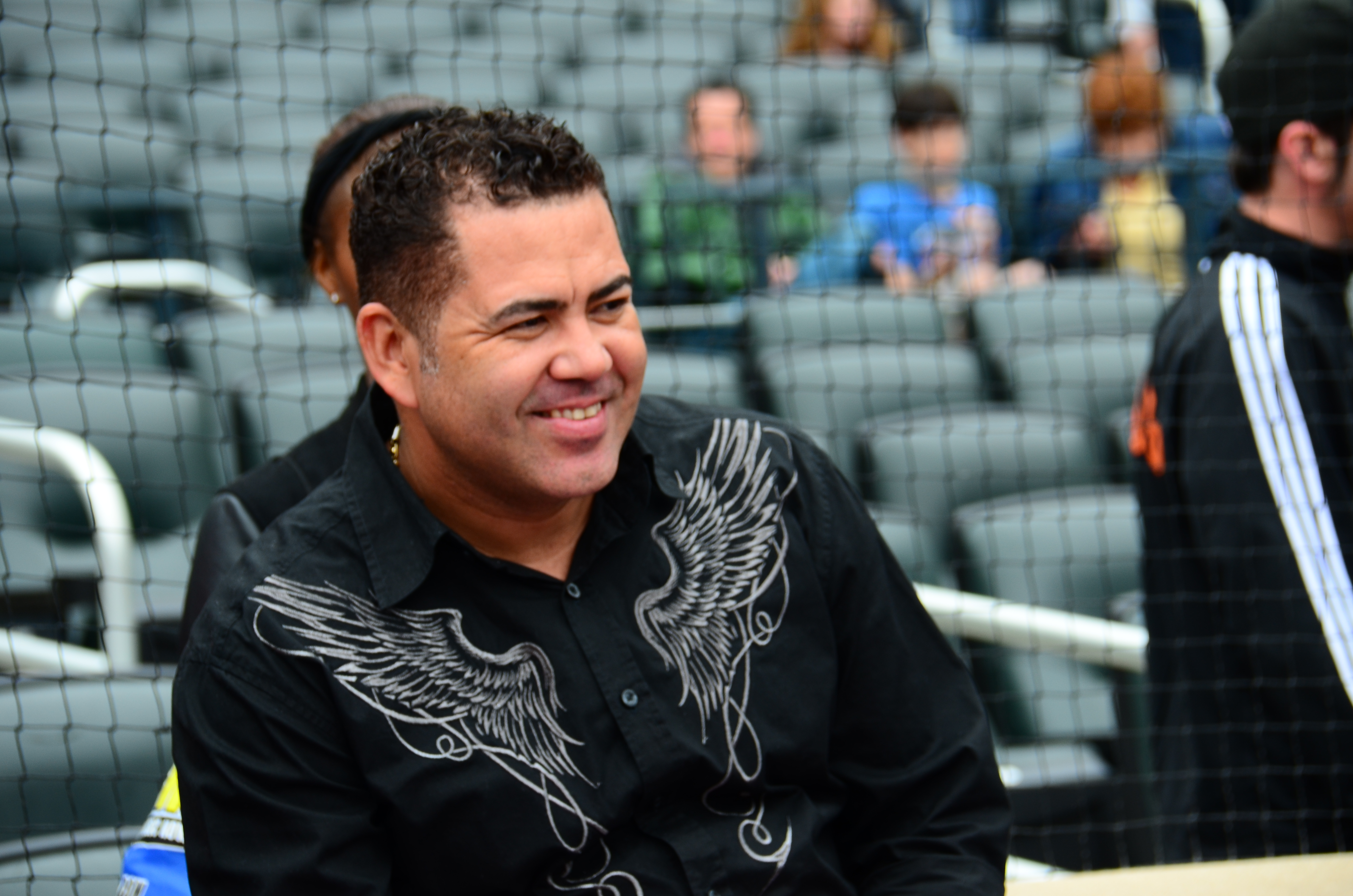
- Alfonzo at Citi Field for Banner Day in 2013
- Third baseman / Second baseman
- Born: November 8, 1973 (age 53); Santa Teresa del Tuy, Miranda, Venezuela
- Batted: Right Threw: Right

Professional debut
- MLB: April 26, 1995, for the New York Mets
- NPB: April 3, 2009, for the Yomiuri Giants

Last appearance
- MLB: June 11, 2006, for the Toronto Blue Jays
- NPB: July 29, 2009, for the Yomiuri Giants

MLB statistics
- Batting average: .284
- Home runs: 146
- Runs batted in: 744

NPB statistics
- Batting average: .146
- Home runs: 2
- Runs batted in: 4
- Stats at Baseball Reference

Teams
- New York Mets (1995–2002); San Francisco Giants (2003–2005); Los Angeles Angels of Anaheim (2006); Toronto Blue Jays (2006); Yomiuri Giants (2009)

Career highlights and awards
- All-Star (2000); Silver Slugger Award (1999); New York Mets Hall of Fame

Member of the Venezuelan

Baseball Hall of Fame
- Induction: 2021
- Vote: 75%
- Election method: Contemporary Committee

Edgardo Antonio Alfonzo (born November 8, 1973), nicknamed "Fonzie", is a Venezuelan former professional baseball player, coach and manager. He played Major League Baseball (MLB) as an infielder from 1995 to 2006, most prominently with the New York Mets, where he became an All-Star and was an integral member of the 2000 National League pennant winning team. Alfonzo's 29.7 wins above replacement (WAR) as a Met place him as the seventh most valuable player in franchise history. He also played for the San Francisco Giants, Los Angeles Angels of Anaheim, Toronto Blue Jays and Navegantes del Magallanes from the LVBP.

After his major league career, he played in the Liga Mexicana de Beisbol in 2008 for the Tigres de Quintana Roo then, played for one season in Nippon Professional Baseball (NPB) with the Yomiuri Giants in 2009. When his playing career ended, Alfonzo became a coach and later, the manager of the Brooklyn Cyclones. In 2020, Alfonzo was inducted into the New York Mets Hall of Fame.

== Early life ==
Alfonzo was born in Santa Teresa del Tuy, Venezuela and was raised in the nearby town of Soapire by mother Mercedes Porfiria, a preschool teacher, and father Edgar Alfonzo Sr., a truck driver. He attended Cecilio Acosta High School in Caracas. Alfonzo's older brother, Edgar Jr., taught him to play baseball. Edgar signed with the California Angels in 1985 when he was 18 years old and Alfonzo was 11. Edgar sent his baseball paychecks back home so that their father did not have to spend time away from the rest of the family driving a truck.

== Playing career ==
=== New York Mets ===
Alfonzo was signed by the Mets as an undrafted free agent in 1991. That year he joined the Gulf Coast League Mets. The following season Alfonzo moved up and split time with the short-season "A" Pittsfield Mets of the New York–Penn League and Class "A" Florida State League St. Lucie Mets in 1992. Alfonzo returned to St. Lucie the next season and played for them in 1993. In 1994, he was promoted to the Binghamton Mets of the Class "AA" Eastern League and led the team in home runs and RBI.

Alfonzo made his Major League debut on April 26, 1995. At the beginning, he was a semi-regular fielder, splitting time at second base, shortstop, and third base with several others. During his rookie season, Alfonzo spent most of his time at third base while accumulating a .310 batting average after the mid-season break. In 1997 and 1998, he started regularly on third. After the 1998 season, the Mets signed third baseman Robin Ventura, and Alfonzo was forced to move to second base. While he was upset about the move at first, he became one of the best defensive second baseman in the league from 1999–2001. Alfonzo was part of the infield considered to be among the best infields in MLB history on a cover of Sports Illustrated, along with Rey Ordóñez, Robin Ventura, and John Olerud. Before the 2002 season, the Mets signed the aging Roberto Alomar, and despite Alfonzo's tremendous offensive and defensive contributions during the previous three seasons, he was forced to move back to third base. He remained strong defensively; however, he struggled on offense, and the Mets decided not to re-sign him.

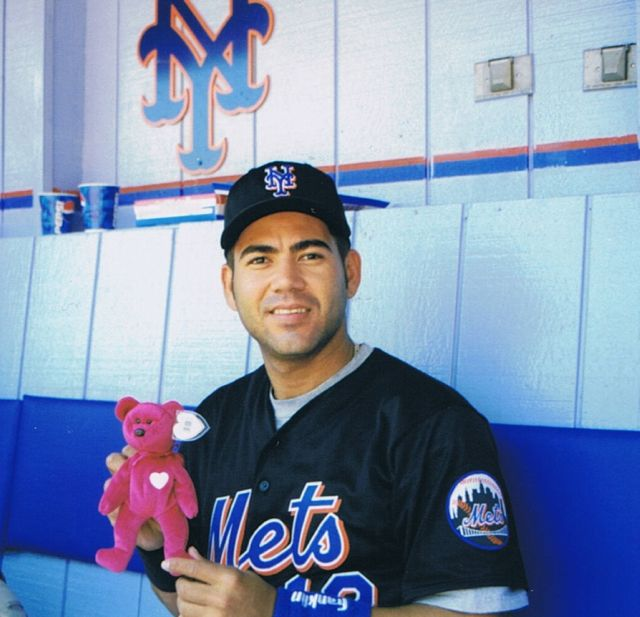
Alfonzo with the Mets on May 30, 1999

Alfonzo had his first opportunity to display his clutch hitting ability to a nationwide audience in the 1999 playoffs. After finishing in a tie with the Cincinnati Reds for the National League Wild Card, the Mets played a one-game playoff to decide who would go on to the division series. In his first at bat of the game, Alfonzo hit a two-run home run over the center field fence, providing the Mets with all the offense they would need as Al Leiter threw a complete-game shutout. On the very next night, the Mets played the Arizona Diamondbacks in the first game of the Division Series. Facing the feared Randy Johnson, Alfonzo again homered in his first at bat of the game, this time launching a two-run shot to center field. In the ninth inning of the same game, with the score deadlocked at 4–4, Alfonzo launched a grand slam down the left field line to help seal the victory for the Mets.

In 2000, playing against the San Francisco Giants in the Division Series, Alfonzo hit a two-run homer in the ninth inning of game two, which would prove to be of immense importance as J. T. Snow launched a three-run homer in the bottom half of the inning to tie the game. The Mets would eventually win the game 5–4 in ten innings. In game three of the series, with the Mets trailing 2–1 in the bottom of the eighth inning, the Giants brought in their dominant closer Robb Nen, who had not blown a save since the All-Star break. Alfonzo responded by lining a ball down the left-field line for a double to drive in Lenny Harris. Benny Agbayani would later homer in the thirteenth inning to win the game for New York. Alfonzo then batted .444 against the Cardinals in the NLCS, but batted just .143 in the World Series against the New York Yankees. Alfonzo's knack for clutch hitting had endeared him to many Met fans, who still consider him one of the all-time Met greats.

Coming off two excellent seasons in which he batted .304 and .324, Alfonzo had every reason to expect a big year in 2001. He had his best power numbers in 1999 (27 home runs, 108 RBI, 41 doubles) and 2000 (25, 94, 40), and at 27, he was at an age in which many hitters have their best season. However, Alfonzo suffered from a variety of injuries, including sore right hand, knee, thigh, and a back injury from years before, costing him playing time and lowering his stats to a .243 average, 17 HR, and 49 RBI in 2001. He finished 2002 with a .308 average, 16 HR, and 56 RBI.

2002 would be Alfonzo's last season as a Met as the team chose to move on, so he then became a free agent. In a show of appreciation to Met fans and New York, Alfonzo spent $15,000 to buy taxi tops (ads on the roofs of New York Yellow Cabs) reading “Fonzie Loves New York,” and “Edgardo Thanks You,” with a photo of himself in an FDNY cap.

=== San Francisco Giants ===
Alfonzo signed with the San Francisco Giants on a 4-year, $26 million contract. In 2003, Alfonzo struggled for most of the first half for the Giants. He was hitting .216 with 27 RBI at mid-season, but he hit .306 with 54 RBI the rest of the way, and performed well against the Florida Marlins in the National League Division Series, when he hit .529 (9-for-17) with five RBI. He had the lowest range factor among Major League third basemen (2.46).

Alfonzo enjoyed a slight career renaissance in 2004 hitting for his career average, although with reduced power numbers. But his career continued its downward trend in 2005 due to age, nagging injuries, and reduced playing time in favor of Pedro Feliz.

=== Los Angeles Angels ===
The Los Angeles Angels acquired Alfonzo in exchange for Steve Finley. As a member of the Angels, Alfonzo's playing time further decreased in favor of younger players. After hitting .100 for the season in late May, the Angels released Alfonzo, whose agent had gone public in demands for a trade for lack of playing time, on May 20.

=== Toronto Blue Jays ===
On May 26, 2006, Edgardo signed a minor league contract with the Toronto Blue Jays and was soon called up to Toronto to help the Jays' injury- and error-riddled middle infield. He was released on June 12, after appearing in only 12 games for Toronto.

=== Bridgeport Bluefish ===
In July 2006, Alfonzo signed a contract with the Bridgeport Bluefish of the independent Atlantic League of Professional Baseball.

=== New York Mets (second stint) ===
After appearing in a small number of games with the Bluefish, Alfonzo's contract was purchased by the Mets on July 15, 2006. Alfonzo reported to the then-Mets Triple-A affiliate Norfolk Tides with hopes of making it back to New York.

=== Long Island Ducks ===
In February 2007, Alfonzo returned to the ALPB, signing with the Long Island Ducks.

=== Texas Rangers ===
On December 14, 2007, Alfonzo signed a minor league contract with an invitation to spring training with the Texas Rangers. After getting reassigned to minor league camp, Alfonzo was released before the season on March 27, 2008, and signed with the Tigres de Quintana Roo in Liga Mexicana de Beisbol.

=== Long Island Ducks (second stint) ===
On June 9, 2008, Alfonzo signed with the Long Island Ducks.

=== Yomiuri Giants ===
In February 2009, Alfonzo signed a one-year contract with the Yomiuri Giants of Japan's Central League.

He was released by the Giants on December 2, 2009.

=== Newark Bears ===
In 2010 Alfonzo signed a contract with the Newark Bears, reuniting him with his former Mets teammate Armando Benítez.

=== Chicago White Sox ===
In 2012, the Chicago White Sox signed Alfonzo and assigned him to the Charlotte Knights.

== Coaching career ==
Alfonzo began serving as the Bench Coach for the Brooklyn Cyclones in 2014 under Tom Gamboa. He originally coached home games and select road games in 2014, before coaching all games in 2015 and 2016. In addition to that role, he served as a roving instructor with the Mets. On January 5, 2017, the Cyclones announced that Alfonzo replaced Gamboa, who had retired from baseball.

Alfonzo led the Brooklyn Cyclones to a New York - Penn League Championship victory on September 10, 2019. This occurred 18 years to the day since the Cyclones won a championship game. The 2001 Brooklyn Cyclones were managed by his brother, Edgar Alfonzo. On October 17, 2019, the Mets informed Alfonzo that his contract to manage the Cyclones would not be renewed.

On January 27, 2022, he was announced as the first manager of the Staten Island FerryHawks. The team finished with a 48–84 record and failed to qualify for the playoffs. Alfonzo was not retained following the season.

== Personal life ==
Alfonzo's older brother, Edgar, played in the minor leagues for 12 seasons. He has managed the Kingsport Mets, Brooklyn Cyclones, Savannah Sand Gnats and St. Lucie Mets. Another brother, Roberto, also played in 70 minor league games in the Mets farm system in 1993–94. A nephew, Giovanny, was selected in the 21st round of the 2015 MLB draft by the Miami Marlins. Another nephew, Edgar Jr., also played minor league baseball.

Alfonzo's son Daniel was selected by the Mets in the 38th round of the 2017 MLB draft out of Bayside High School in Queens, New York.

== Highlights ==
- All-Star (2000)
- Silver Slugger Award (1999)
- Top 10 MVP (8th, 1999)
- Top 10 in batting average (1997, 2002)
- Finished second in Gold Glove balloting on three occasions; in 1997 as a third baseman, and in 1999 and 2001 at second base. Alfonzo finished third in the voting as a third baseman in 1999 and fourth in 2004 at second base.
- Currently ranks third in New York Mets franchise history with 1,136 hits and fifth with 538 RBI.
- Currently ranks third in New York Mets franchise history with 123 runs scored in a single season. This feat was accomplished in the 1999 season.
- All-time New York Mets leader in postseason hits (26)
- On July 31, 2021, the Mets inducted Alfonzo into the New York Mets Hall of Fame in a ceremony at Citi Field.

== See also ==
- List of Major League Baseball players from Venezuela
- List of Major League Baseball single-game hits leaders
