= Independence Plaza (disambiguation) =

Independence Plaza or variation may refer to:

- Independence Plaza, Midland, Texas, USA; an office building
- Plaza de la Independencia, Quito, Ecuador; a public square
- Plaza Independencia, Montevideo, Uruguay; a public square
- Plaza Independencia (Cebu City), Philippines

== See also ==
- Independence Mall (disambiguation)
- Independence Square (disambiguation)
- Independence (disambiguation)
- Plaza (disambiguation)
- Azad Maidan, Mumbai, India
