= Belgrano (Buenos Aires Underground) =

Buenos Aires Underground station

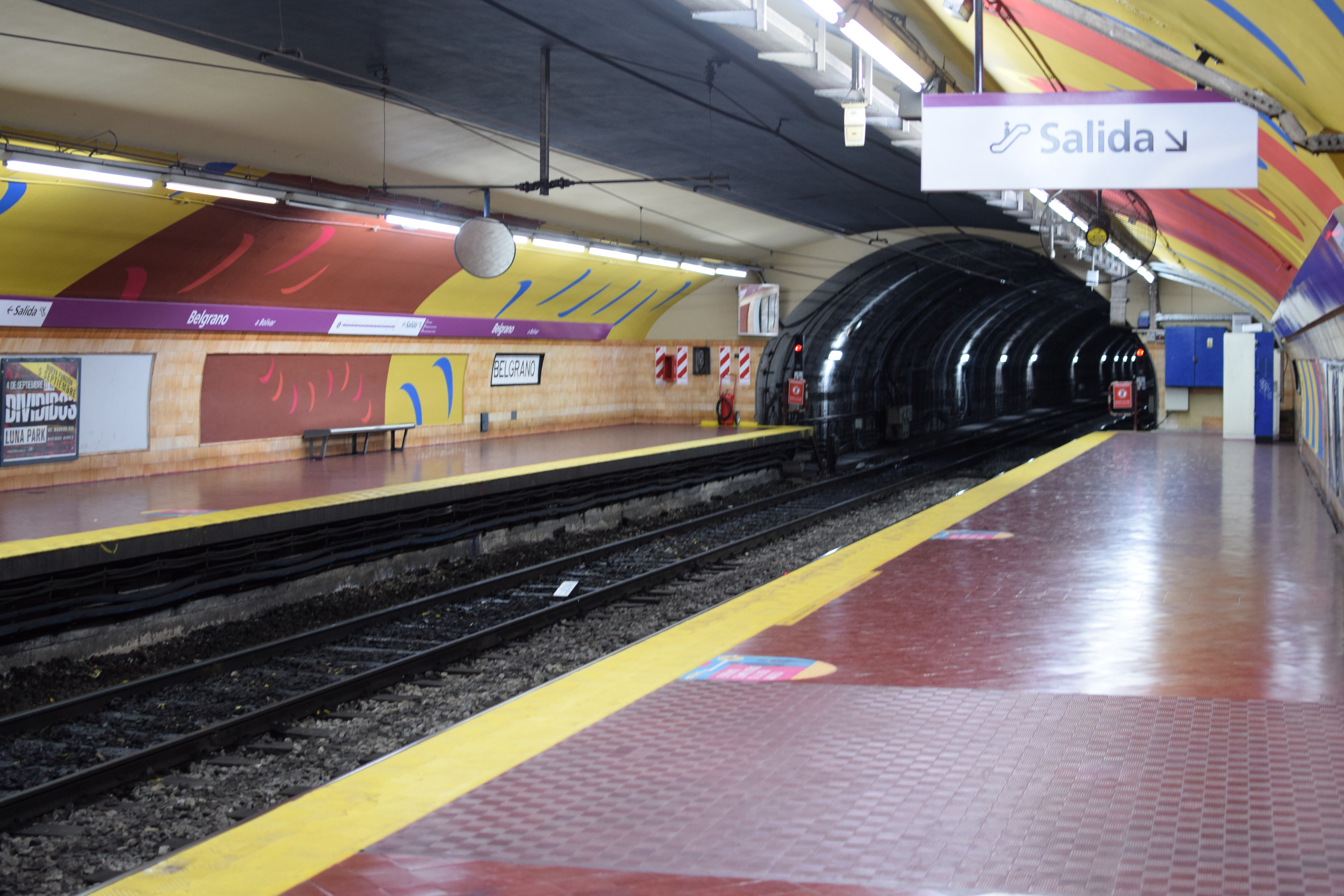

General information
- Location: Belgrano 800
- Coordinates: 34°36′46.3″S 58°22′39.1″W
- Platforms: Side platforms

History
- Opened: 24 April 1966

Services
Preceding station	Buenos Aires Underground	Following station
Independencia towards Plaza de los Virreyes	Line E	Bolívar towards Retiro
Location

Belgrano is a station on Line E of the Buenos Aires Underground.

The station was opened on 24 April 1966 as part of the extension of the line from San José to Bolívar. The name of the station pays homage to Manuel Belgrano, creator of the Argentinian flag.

The station is located at the intersection of the Julio Roca and Belgrano avenues.

== Gallery ==
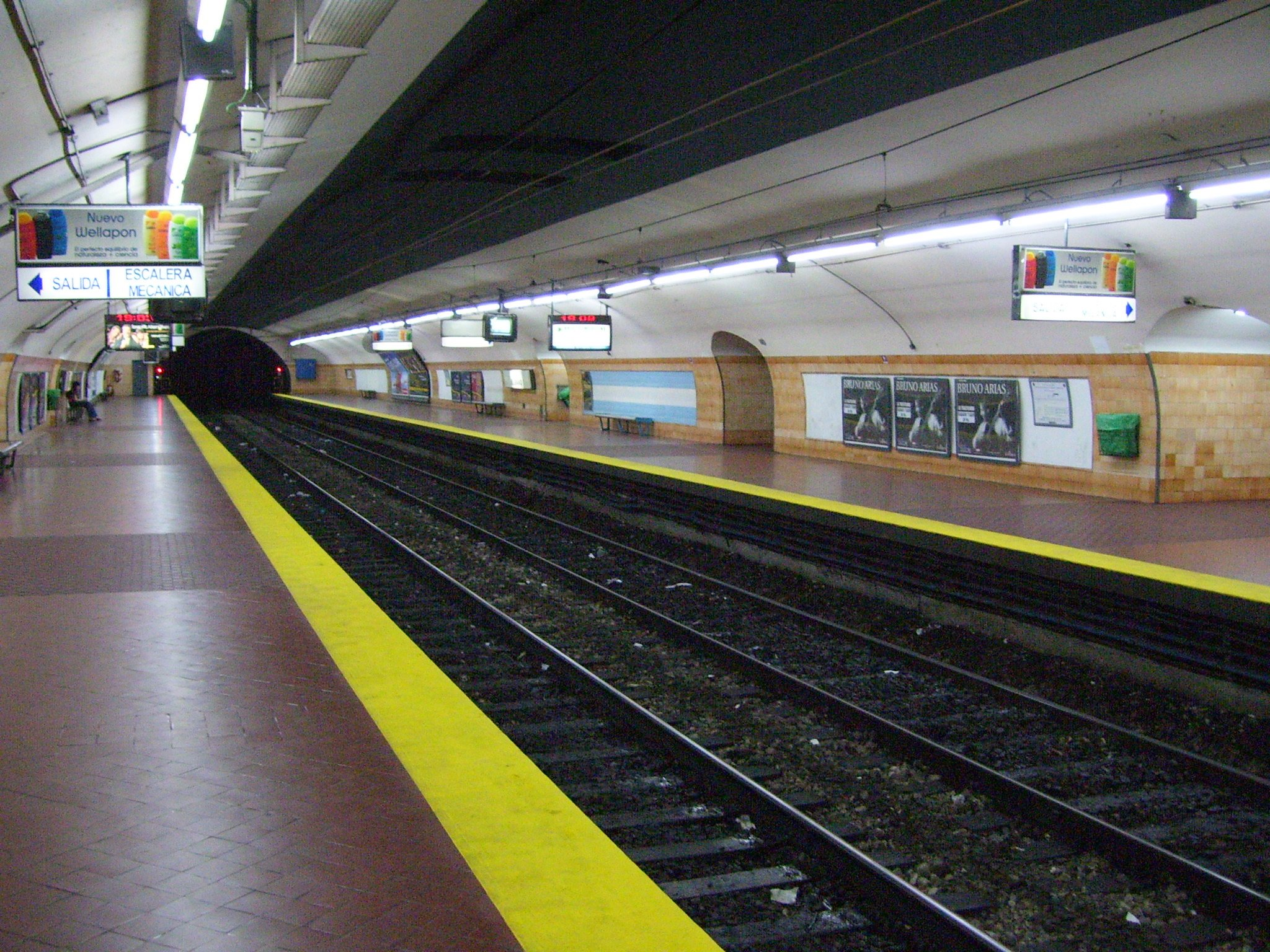

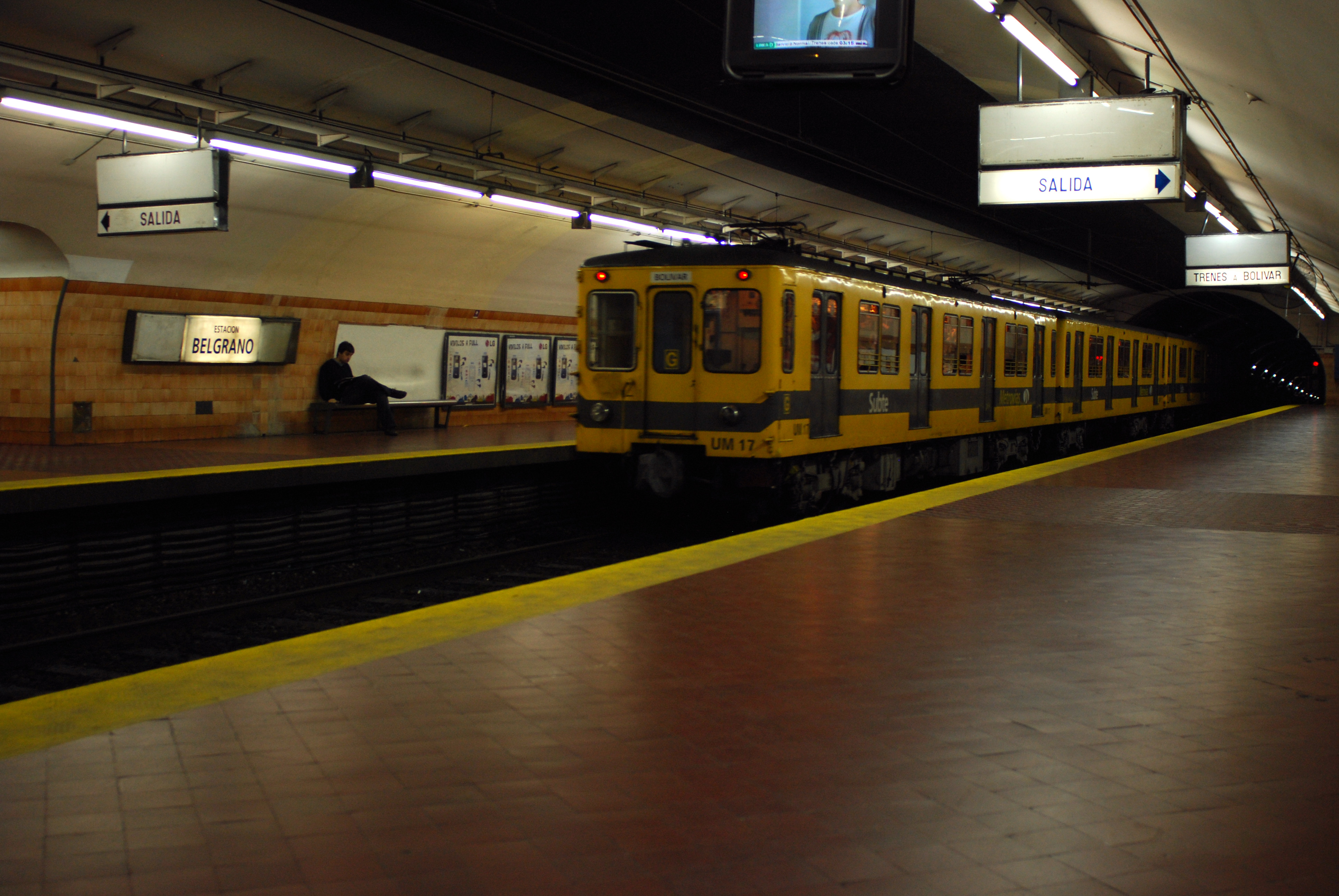

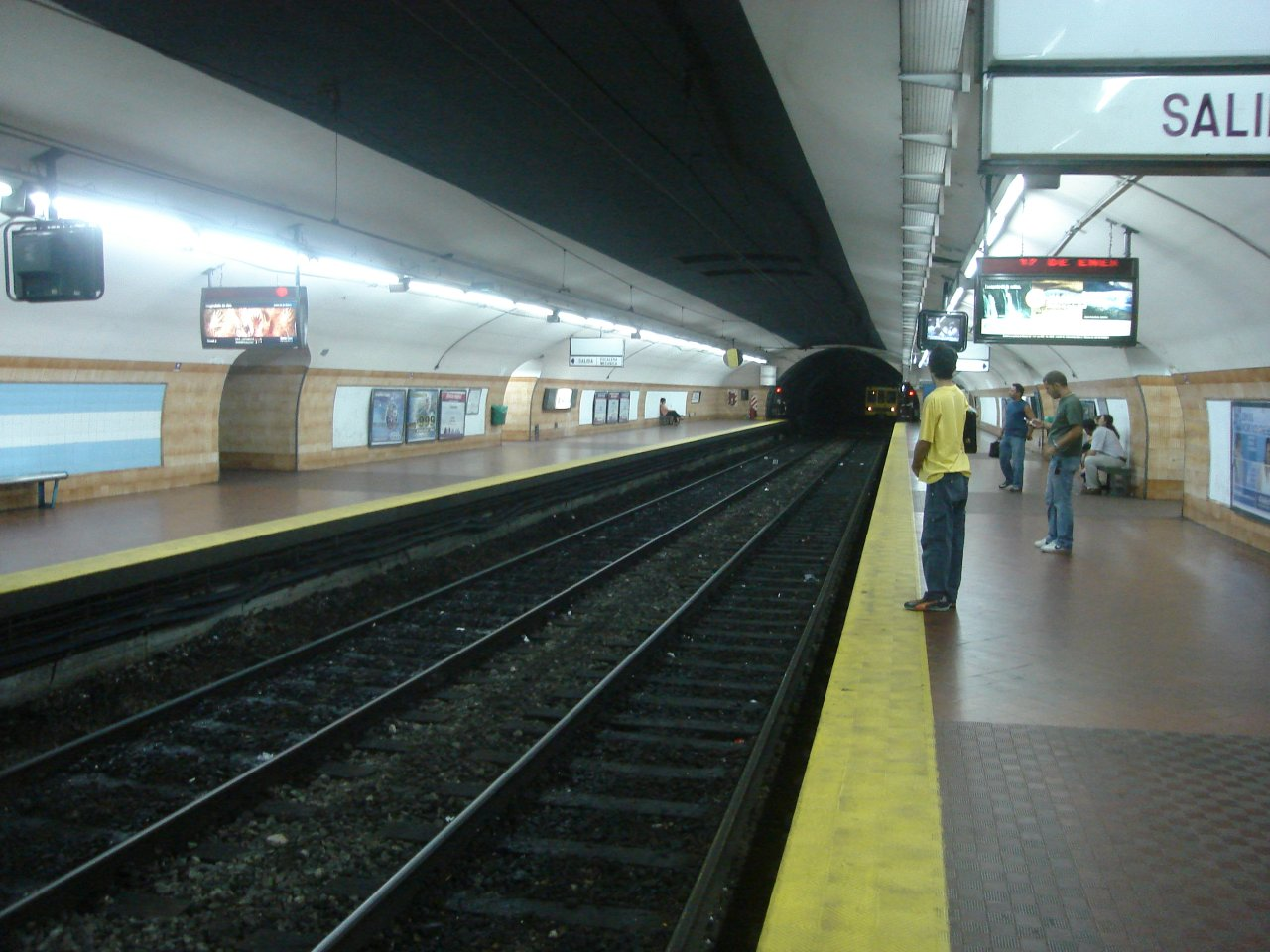

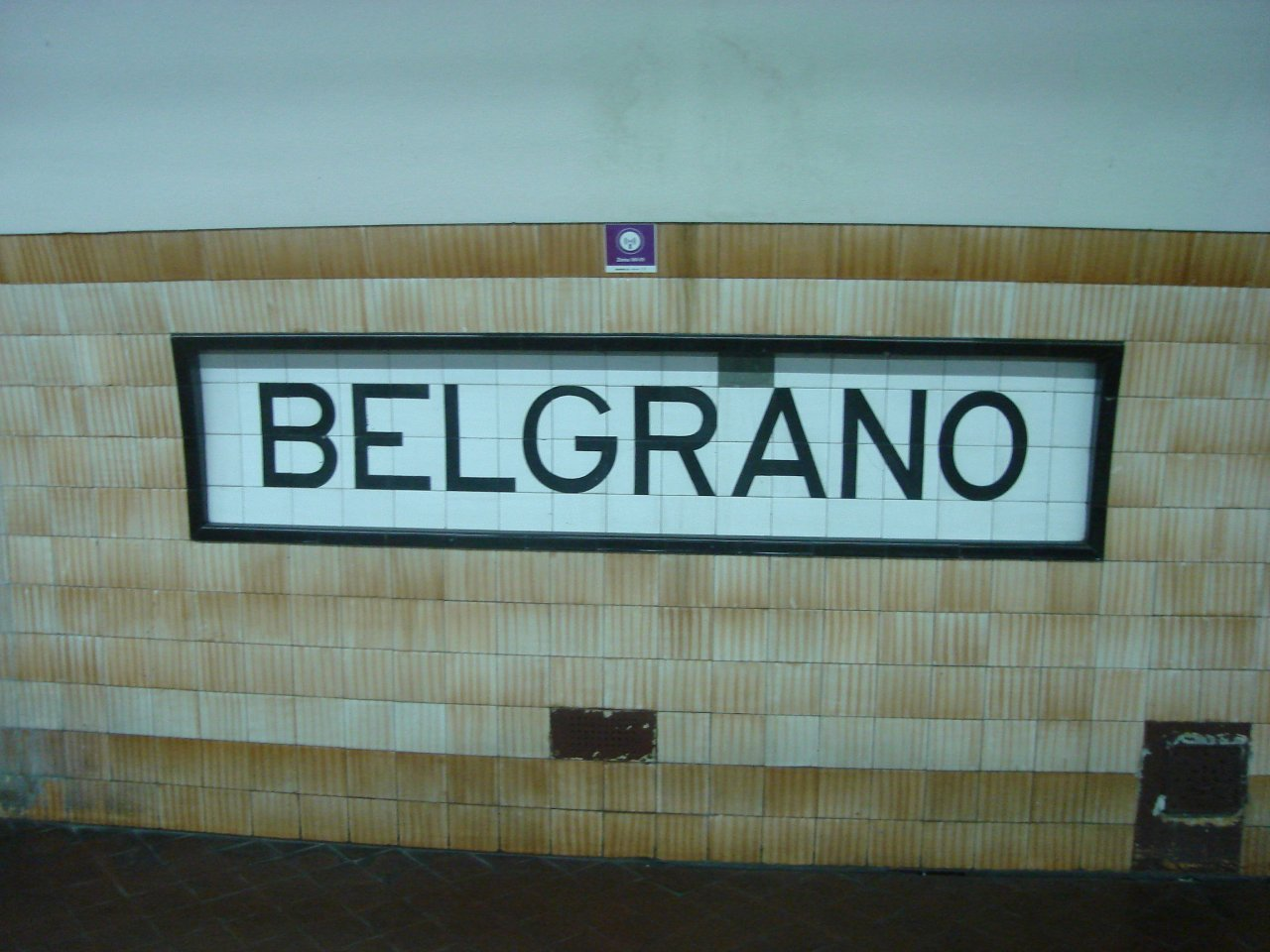
