= Moreno (Buenos Aires Underground) =

Buenos Aires Underground station

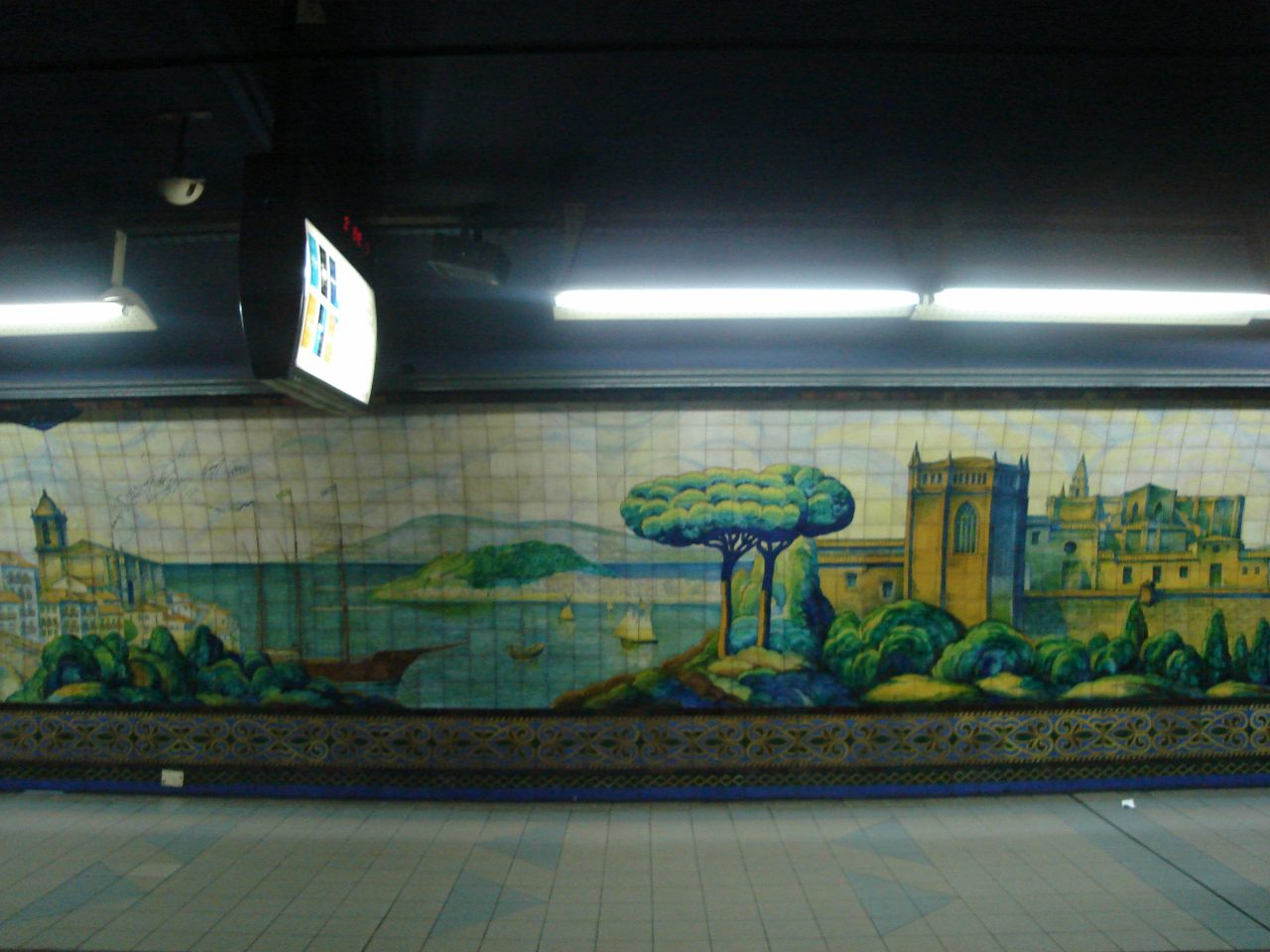

General information
- Location: Bernardo de Irigoyen and Moreno
- Coordinates: 34°36′45.4″S 58°22′50.1″W
- Platforms: Side platforms

History
- Opened: 9 November 1934

Services
Preceding station	Buenos Aires Underground	Following station
Avenida de Mayo towards Retiro	Line C	Independencia towards Constitución
Location

Moreno is a station on Line C of the Buenos Aires Underground in Argentina. From here passengers may transfer to Metrobus 9 de Julio. The station was opened on 9 November 1934 as part of the inaugural section of the line, from Constitución to Diagonal Norte.
