= Independence College =

Independence College or variation may refer to:

- Independence Junior College, Independence Village, Stann Creek District, Belize; a tertiary school
- Independence Community College, formerly Independence Community Junior College, in Independence, Kansas, USA
- Independence University, formerly California College for Health Sciences, Salt Lake City, Utah, USA; an online university

== See also ==
- Independence (disambiguation)
