= Independence Mall =

Independence Mall may refer to:

== United States ==
- Kingston Collection, formerly known as The Independence Mall, Plymouth County, Massachusetts
- Independence Center, Independence, Missouri
- Independence Mall (North Carolina), Wilmington, North Carolina
- Independence National Historical Park, Philadelphia, Pennsylvania

== See also ==
- Independence Plaza (disambiguation)
- Independence Centre (disambiguation)
- Independence (disambiguation)
