= Independencia Department =

Independencia Department may refer to:

- Independencia Department, Chaco
- Independencia Department, La Rioja
