= Independence Avenue =

Independence Avenue may refer to:

- Independence Avenue (Minsk), Belarus
- Independence Avenue (Santiago de Chile), Chile
- Independence Avenue (Szczecin), Poland
- Independence Avenue (Washington, D.C.), United States
- Independence Avenue (Windhoek), Namibia
- İstiklal Avenue, Istanbul, Turkey (İstiklal means Independence)
