= Independencia (Buenos Aires Underground) =

Buenos Aires Underground station

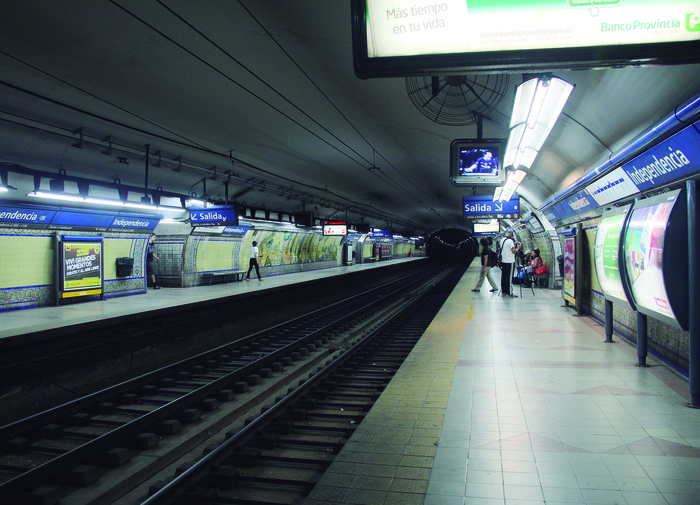

General information
- Location: Bernardo de Irigoyen and Independencia
- Coordinates: 34°37′05″S 58°22′49″W
- Platforms: Side platforms

History
- Opened: 9 November 1934

Services
Preceding station	Buenos Aires Underground	Following station
Moreno towards Retiro	Line C Transfer to: Independencia	San Juan towards Constitución
Location

Independencia is an underground station in Buenos Aires, Argentina serviced by two lines. The Line C platforms were opened in 1934. The Line E platforms, Independencia – Santa Mama Antula, were opened in 1966.

== History ==
The Line C station was opened on 9 November 1934 as part of the inaugural section of the line, from Constitución to Diagonal Norte.

Independencia – Santa Mama Antula
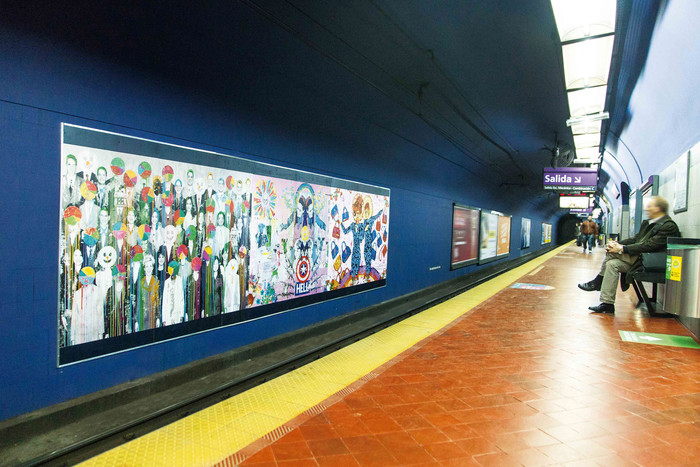

General information
- Location: Bernardo de Irigoyen 700
- Coordinates: 34°37′05″S 58°22′53″W
- Platforms: Island platforms

History
- Opened: 24 April 1966

Services
Preceding station	Buenos Aires Underground	Following station
San José towards Plaza de los Virreyes	Line E Transfer to: Independencia	Belgrano towards Retiro
Location

The Line E platforms were opened on 24 April 1966 as part of the extension of Line E from San José to Bolívar.

The two lines are connected by underground tunnels.

== Location ==
The station lies under the intersection of Avenida Independencia (from which it takes its name) and Avenida 9 de Julio. Notable sites within walking distance of the station include the Argentine University of Enterprise (UADE) and the University of Buenos Aires Faculty of Social Sciences.

At Independencia, passengers can transfer between the two lines or to Metrobus 9 de Julio.

== Popular culture ==
The station was used as a set in the 1996 Argentine science fiction film Moebius.
