= Independence, Defiance County, Ohio =

Unincorporated community in Ohio, U.S.

Coordinates: 41°17′52″N 84°18′00″W

Independence is an unincorporated community in Defiance County, in the U.S. state of Ohio.

== History ==
Independence was founded around 1838.
