= Independencia Municipality, Táchira =

Municipality in Táchira, Venezuela

Independencia Municipality Municipio Independencia
- Municipality

- Flag Seal

- Location in Táchira

- Location in Venezuela
- Coordinates: 7°48′52″N 72°17′28″W
- Country: Venezuela
- State: Táchira
- Founded: 1851
- Municipal seat: Capacho Nuevo

Government
  - Mayor: Luis Mendoza Chacón (PSUV)

Area
  - Total: 60.6 km^{2} (23.4 sq mi)

Population (2023)
  - Total: 47,114
  - Density: 777/km^{2} (2,010/sq mi)
- Time zone: UTC−4 (VET)
- Area code(s): 0277

The Independencia Municipality is one of the 29 municipalities that makes up the western Venezuelan state of Táchira and, according to the 2023 Venezuelan census, the municipality had a population of 47,114. The mayor of the municipality is Luis Mendoza Chacón of the PSUV and the town of Capacho Nuevo is the municipal seat of the Independencia Municipality.
