= Mount Independence =

In the United States Mount Independence can refer to:

- Mount Independence (Idaho), a mountain in Idaho
- Mount Independence (Massachusetts), a summit in Massachusetts
- Mount Independence (New York), a summit in Otsego County, New York
- Mount Independence (Pennsylvania), a populated place in Pennsylvania
- Mount Independence (Vermont), a hill and historic site in Vermont
