= Independence Paragliding =

German paraglider manufacturer

- Company type: Privately held company
- Industry: Aerospace
- Founder: Michaël Nesler and Christian Amon
- Headquarters: Eisenberg, Bavaria, Germany
- Products: Paragliders
- Parent: Fly-Market Flugsport-Zubehör GmbH & Co. KG
- Website: www.independence.aero

Independence Paragliding is a German aircraft manufacturer based in Eisenberg, Bavaria and founded by designer Michaël Nesler and test pilot Christian Amon. The company is a division of Fly-Market Flugsport-Zubehör GmbH & Co. KG and specializes in the design and manufacture of paragliders in the form of ready-to-fly aircraft as well as reserve parachutes, harnesses and paragliding accessories.

The company's line of aircraft in the mid-2000s included the Akron intermediate glider, the Avalon beginner glider and the Dragon intermediate. The competition glider of that period, the Raptor, was sold at a discounted price to support competition pilots. The company also sold a two-place glider for flight training, the Speed Tandem.

== Aircraft ==
Summary of aircraft built by Independence Paragliding:

- Independence Air Taxi
- Independence Akron
- Independence Avalon
- Independence Cruiser
- Independence Draco
- Independence Dragon
- Independence Duett
- Independence Duke
- Independence Excalibur
- Independence Galaxy
- Independence Garuda
- Independence Grasshopper
- Independence Geronimo
- Independence Groundhandling Trainer
- Independence Merlin
- Independence Mountain
- Independence Pioneer
- Independence Raptor
- Independence Speed
- Independence Speed Tandem
- Independence Sportster
- Independence Striker
- Independence Tensing
- Independence T-Fighter
- Independence Trainer
- Independence Voyager
- Independence Zippy PT
