= Independence Township, Schuyler County, Missouri =

Township in the American state of Missouri

Coordinates: 40.4114°N 92.4231°W

Independence Township is an inactive township in Schuyler County, in the U.S. state of Missouri.

Independence Township was erected in 1843, located in the southeast corner of the county.
