= Independence Stadium =

Independence Stadium may also refer to:

- Independence Stadium (Bakau) in Gambia
- Independence Stadium (Namibia) in Windhoek
- Independence Stadium (South Africa) in Mthatha, a football stadium in South Africa
- Independence Stadium (Tanzania) in Dar es Salaam
- Independence Stadium (Shreveport) in Louisiana, US
- Independence Stadium (Zambia) in Lusaka
- Stadium Merdeka (Independence Stadium) in Malaysia
