= Independence High School =

Independence High School may refer to:

- Independence High School (Glendale, Arizona) in Glendale, Arizona
- Independence High School (Alhambra, California) in Alhambra, California
- Independence High School (Brentwood, California) in Brentwood, California
- Independence High School (Bakersfield, California) in Bakersfield, California
- Independence High School (Diamond Springs, California) in Diamond Springs, California
- Independence High School (Jackson, California) in Jackson, California
- Independence High School (Madera, California) in Madera, California
- Independence High School (Lake Balboa, Los Angeles, California) in Lake Balboa, Los Angeles
- Independence High School (Merced, California) in Merced, California
- Independence High School (Roseville, California) in Roseville, California
- Independence High School (San Francisco, California) in San Francisco, California
- Independence High School (San Jose, California) in San Jose, California
- Independence High School (Sutter Creek, California) in Sutter Creek, California
- Independence High School (Van Nuys, California) in Van Nuys, California
- Independence High School (Wasco, California) in Wasco, California
- Independence High School (Alpharetta, Georgia) in Alpharetta, Georgia
- Independence High School (Illinois) in Country Club Hills, Illinois
- Independence High School (Iowa) in Independence, Iowa
- Independence High School (Kansas) in Independence, Kansas
- Independence High School (Louisiana) in Independence, Louisiana
- Independence High School (Mississippi) in Independence, Mississippi
- Independence High School (Nevada) in Elko, Nevada
- Independence High School (New Jersey) in Irvington, New Jersey
- Independence High School (Charlotte, North Carolina) in Charlotte, North Carolina
- Independence High School (Winston-Salem, North Carolina) in Winston-Salem, North Carolina
- Independence High School (Columbus, Ohio) in Columbus, Ohio
- Independence High School (Independence, Ohio) in Independence, Ohio
- Independence High School (Oklahoma)
- Independence High School (Tennessee) in Thompson's Station, Tennessee
- Independence High School (Frisco, Texas) in Frisco, Texas
- Independence High School (Utah) in Provo, Utah
- Independence High School (Ashburn, Virginia) in Ashburn, Virginia
- Independence High School (West Virginia) in Coal City, West Virginia
- Independence High School (Wisconsin) in Independence, Wisconsin
- Independence High School (Wyoming) in Rock Springs, Wyoming

== See also ==
- Baltimore Independence School, a public charter high school in Baltimore, Maryland
