= Independence (fireboat) =

The Philadelphia Fire Department started operating the fireboat Independence in 2007. The vessel was purchased for $5 million, $4.5 million of which came from a FEMA Port Security Grant.

On September 10, 2010, both the Independence and a smaller fireboat, Fireboat Seven from Westville, New Jersey, responded to a dock fire in Paulsboro, New Jersey. Fireboat Seven arrived first and put the fire out prior to the arrival of Independence. Independence received orders to turn around when it was near the dock. She reversed quickly generating a large wake which apparently caused Fireboat Seven to collide with shore-side equipment.

Westville's insurance adjuster determined Fireboat Seven was damaged beyond repair. Having initially failed to reach a settlement with the City of Philadelphia, on July 30, 2014, Westville filed a lawsuit in Federal Court. Philadelphia countersued. Philadelphia settled on March 31, 2016 for $117,000.

Specifications
Length	20.15 metres (66.1 ft)
Beam, Moulded	6 metres (20 ft)
Depth, Moulded	2.28 metres (7.5 ft)
Draft	0.81 metres (2.7 ft)
Power	4 x 681 kilowatts (913 shp)
Maximum speed	36 knots (67 km/h)
Fire monitors	1 x 3,500 gpm (800 m³/hr) – remote controlled, and operated on a hinged lifting mast for elevated operations 1 x 1,500 gpm (343 m³/hr) – manual controls, forward 2 x 1,000 gpm (2 x 230 m³/hr) – manual controls

== See also ==
- Fireboats of Philadelphia
