= Independence Center =

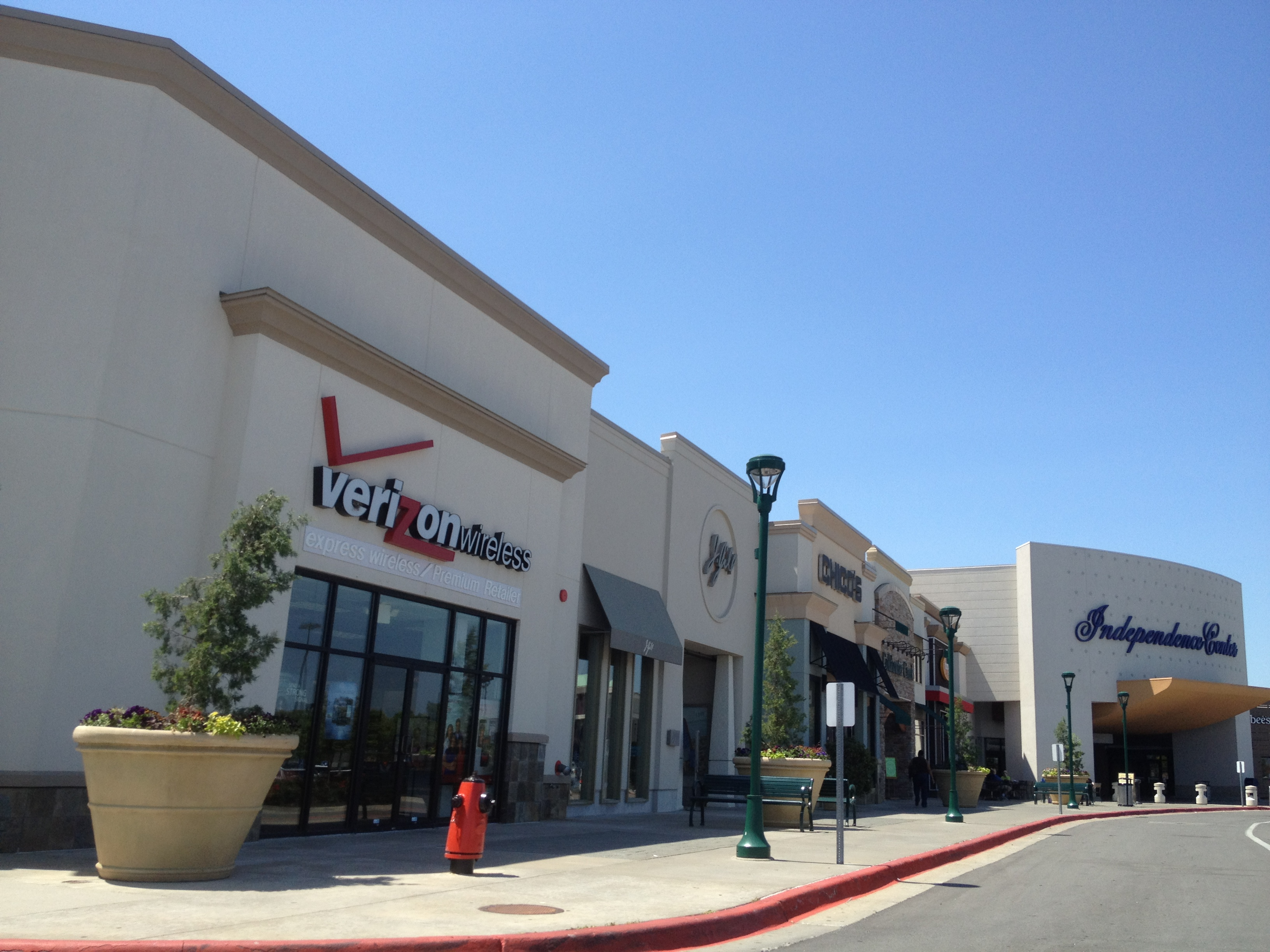
- One view of Independence Center, May 2012
- Location: Independence, Missouri, United States
- Coordinates: 39°02′43″N 94°21′29″W
- Opened: 1974
- Developer: Homart Development Company
- Owner: International Growth Properties
- Architect: Architectonics, Inc.
- Num. of stores: 120+
- Num. of anchor tenants: 4 (2 open, 2 vacant)
- Floor area: 1,032,000 sq ft (95,900 m^{2})
- Floors: 2 with partial 3rd floor (3 in Dillard's)
- Public transit: RideKC; Inde*Bus
- Website: shopindependencecenter.com

Independence Center is a 1,032,000-square-foot (95,900 m^{2}) shopping mall located in Independence, Missouri. Anchor stores are Dick's Sporting Goods and Dillard's with two vacant anchors last occupied by Macy's and Sears.

== History ==
=== Opening ===
Independence Center was built by Homart, a division of Sears Roebuck & Co. Architectonics, Inc. of Dallas was architect, C. H. Leavell & Co. also of Dallas was general contractor.

The mall opened in 1974. Its three department stores were Macy's, Sears, and Stix, Baer & Fuller's. The mall featured a unique three-level 60-foot-tall (18 m) central atrium, with a series of ramps and stair risers traversing the expanse of open space. In the center of the atrium, on the lowest floor, was a food court. When it first opened and for many years afterward, the mall's advertising carried the memorable slogan "Independence Center: The "I" has it." Independence Center even featured an enormous flashing advertising marquee which stood along I-70.

=== 1980s and 1990s ===
The mall saw its first cosmetic renovation in the mid-1980s. Stix Baer & Fuller became Dillard's after they acquired the chain in 1984. In 1985, after Dillard's acquired Macy's Midwest stores, it sold the Independence Center location to Mercantile Stores, then the parent company of The Jones Store Co.

In 1994, Independence Center was purchased by Simon Property Group.

In 1996, the mall added a two-story carousel in the atrium; and in 1998, the mall underwent a massive $20 million renovation, which improved the property's aesthetics and vertical transportation, it also improved the food court, and a large children's play area was added to the mall.

=== 2000s and 2010s ===
In 2004, Independence Center saw another renovation, which added small shop space on the outside of the mall facing 39th Street.

In 2006 Macy's returned to its original location in the mall after the Federated-May department stores merger, which resulted in all Kansas City area Jones Store locations being converted to Macy's stores.

In 2015, it was announced that the malls Sears location would be downsized to make way for a new Dick’s Sporting Goods location. Dick’s had relocated from the nearby Bolger Square. The mall had also received new signage on the malls entrances and a road facing sign, along with some minor renovations to the mall to coincide with the opening of the new store. Dick’s Sporting Goods opened at the Independence Center in February 2016.

=== Financial issues and sale ===
In February 2018, Independence Center was foreclosed on, as Simon Property Group had defaulted on a $200 million loan, as the property’s value gone from $250 million in 2007 down to $136 million in the summer of 2017. Because of this, the Simon signage and branding on the property were removed and the mall was removed from Simon’s website. Pacific Retail Capital Partners assumed management of the mall in the process of the sale.

In March 2019, it was announced that a Los Angeles based company, International Growth Properties, had acquired the Independence Center for a steep discount of $57 million.

On August 6, 2019, it was announced that Sears would be closing this location as part of a plan to close 26 stores nationwide. The store closed on October 27, 2019, at 3PM.

On August 20, 2019, the carousel and the play area on the ground floor were disassembled and removed from the mall and was replaced by a new entertainment concept called “The District”.

On January 6, 2021, it was announced that Macy's would also be closing on March 21, 2021 as part of a plan to close 46 stores nationwide (the European Furniture Center opened in the vacant Macy's in May, 2022 and closed in July, 2023), which left Dick's Sporting Goods and Dillard's as the only anchors left.

As of 2026, Independence Center is up for sale, including the former Macy's (which is separate from the sale), while Transformco Properties owns the former Sears building, which it too is up for lease or sale.

== Overview ==
Independence Center is the second-largest mall in the KC Metro Area, behind Oak Park Mall.

With 12 million annual visitors, Independence Center has constantly been named the most visited attraction in Independence, Missouri. Department stores and other tenants earn their highest sales in the Independence area at Independence Center.

== See also ==
- Independence Mall (disambiguation)
