= Independencia Municipality, Miranda =

Independencia Municipality Municipio Independencia
- Municipality
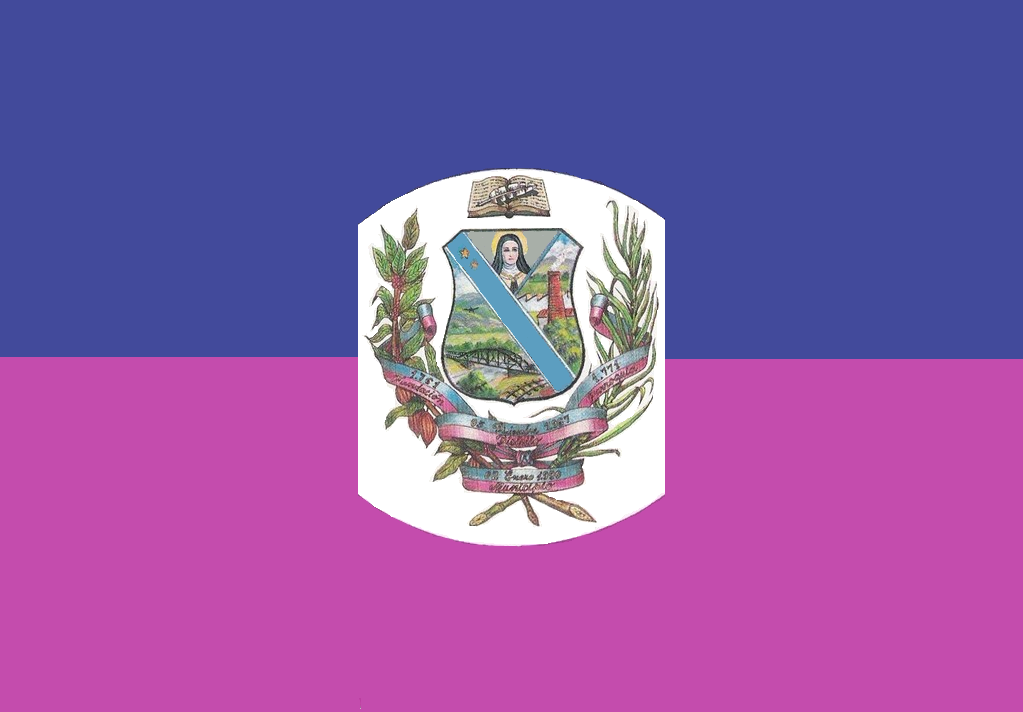
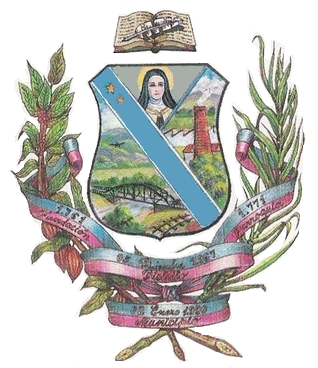
- Flag Coat of arms

- Location in Miranda

- Location in Venezuela
- Coordinates: 10°11′05″N 66°36′52″W
- Country: Venezuela
- State: Miranda
- Municipal seat: Santa Teresa del Tuy

Government
  - Mayor: Rayner Pulido Fuentes (PSUV)

Area
  - Total: 366.2 km^{2} (141.4 sq mi)

Population (2007)
  - Total: 160,899
  - Density: 439.4/km^{2} (1,138/sq mi)
- Time zone: UTC−4 (VET)
- Area code(s): 0239
- Website: Official website

Independencia is one of the 21 municipalities (municipios) that makes up the Venezuelan state of Miranda and, according to a 2007 population estimate by the National Institute of Statistics of Venezuela, the municipality has a population of 160,899. The town of Santa Teresa del Tuy is the municipal seat of the Independencia Municipality.

== Demographics ==
The Independencia Municipality, according to a 2007 population estimate by the National Institute of Statistics of Venezuela, has a population of 160,899 (up from 137,469 in 2000). This amounts to 5.6% of the state's population. The municipality's population density is 566.55 inhabitants per square kilometre (1,467.4/sq mi).

== Government ==
The mayor of the Independencia Municipality is Wilmer Salazar, re-elected on October 31, 2004, with 50% of the vote. The municipality is divided into two parishes; Santa Teresa del Tuy and El Cartanal.
