= Independence Airport (disambiguation) =

Independence Airport may refer to:

- Independence Airport in Independence, California, United States (FAA: 2O7)
- Independence Airport (Belize) in Belize
- Independence Municipal Airport (Iowa) in Independence, Iowa, United States (FAA: KIIB)
- Independence Municipal Airport (Kansas) in Independence, Kansas, United States (FAA: KIDP)
- Independence State Airport in Independence, Oregon, United States (FAA: 7S5)

Other airports located in cities named Independence:

- Faust Field a private use airport in Independence, Oregon, United States (FAA ID: OR77)
- Wigrich Airport a private use airport in Independence, Oregon, United States (FAA ID: OR85)
