= Fort Independence =

Fort Independence is the name of several forts in the United States:

- Fort Independence (California), U.S. Cavalry fort during the 1860s, now site of the Fort Independence Indian Reservation near Independence, California
- Fort Independence (Colorado), frontier trading post near present-day Pueblo, Colorado
- Fort Independence (Massachusetts), fort located at the mouth of Boston harbor on Castle Island
- Fort Independence (Missouri), in Independence, Missouri; the starting point of the Oregon Trail
- Fort Independence (Nebraska) military installation in Nebraska in the 1900s
- Fort Independence (Vermont), is an infrequently used and incorrect alternative name for Mount Independence in Orwell, Vermont
- Fort Independence (New York), Revolutionary War fort in the Bronx, NY
- Fort Independence (New York), Revolutionary War fort at Peekskill, NY

== People ==
- Fort Independence Indian Community of Paiute Indians, a federally recognized tribe in California
