= Independence class =

Independence class may refer to:

- Independence-class littoral combat ship, a series of United States Navy littoral combat ships
- Independence-class littoral mission vessel, a series of Republic of Singapore Navy littoral mission ships
- Independence-class aircraft carrier, a series of light carriers built for the United States Navy that served during World War II
