= Wilco Building =

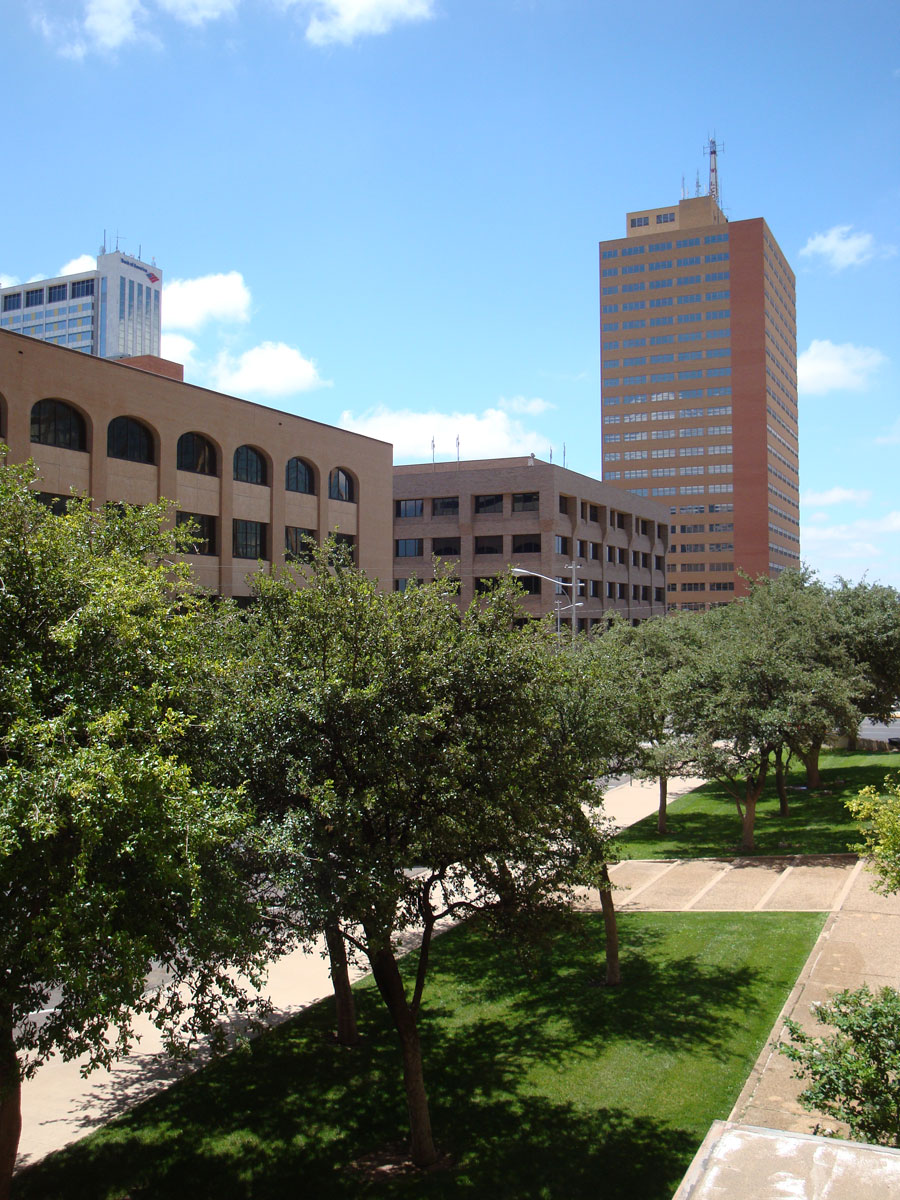
- View of the Wilco Building looking South
- Interactive map of the Wilco Building area

Record height
- Preceded by: Centennial Tower
- Surpassed by: Bank of America Building

General information
- Status: Completed
- Type: Office space
- Location: 415 W. Wall St. Midland
- Coordinates: 31.997325°N 102.078347°W
- Construction started: 1956
- Completed: 1958
- Opening: 1958
- Owner: Wilco Building Partners, Ltd.

Height
- Roof: 308 ft (94 m)
- Top floor: 22

Technical details
- Floor count: 22
- Floor area: 197,207 sq ft (18,321.1 m^{2})

Design and construction
- Architect: Dan Boone

Other information
- Parking: Attached parking garage

The Wilco Building is a high rise in downtown Midland, Texas. At 308 feet (94 m) tall and 22 floors, it is the second-tallest building in the city after the Bank of America Building. In 1985, the Wilco Building underwent some renovations. It is one of the iconic images of the Midland downtown skyline.

== See also ==
- List of tallest buildings in Midland, Texas
