= Bank of America Building (Midland) =

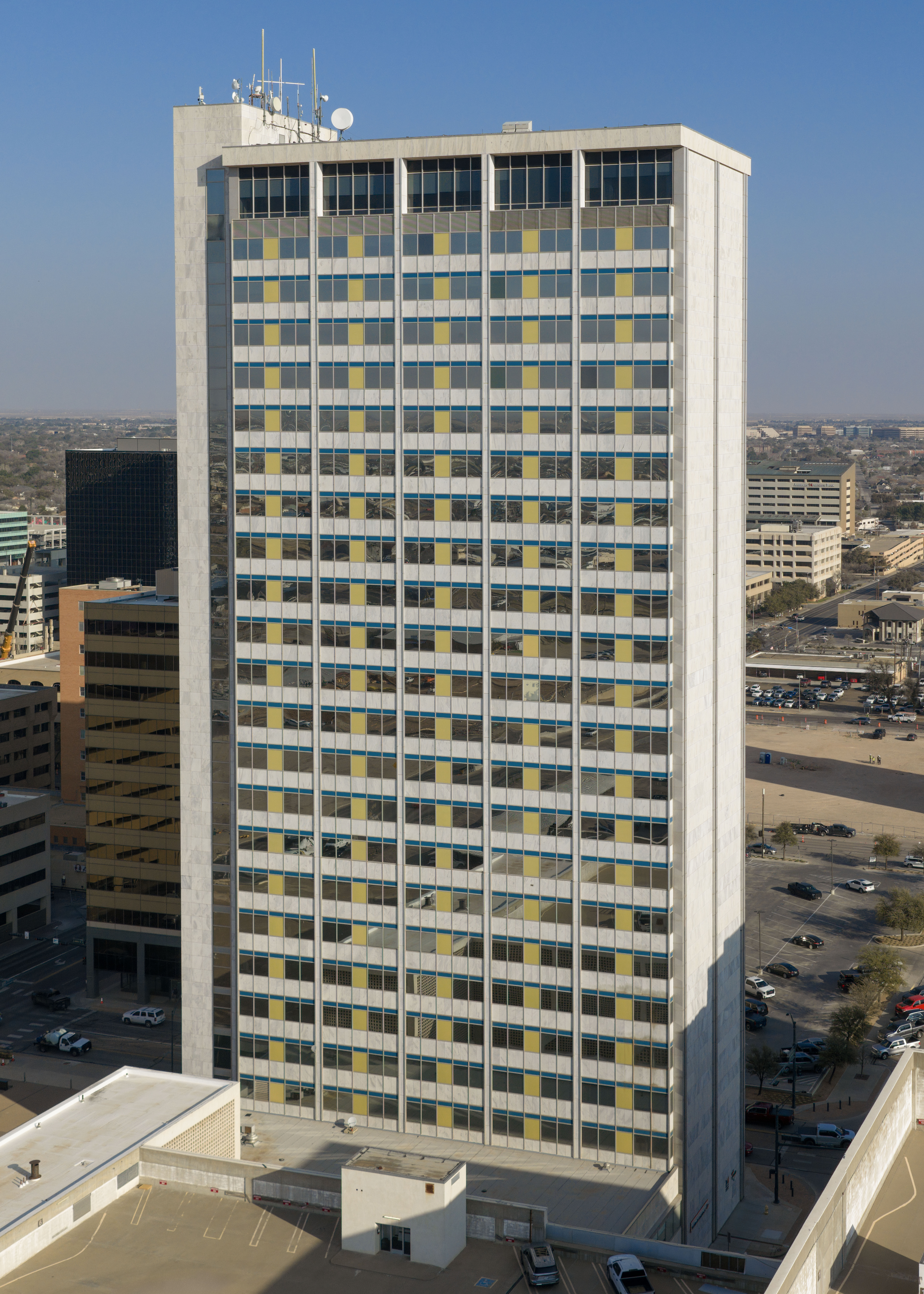
- Aerial view of the Bank of America Building
- Interactive map of the Bank of America Building area

Record height
- Preceded by: Wilco Building
- Surpassed by: Present

General information
- Status: Completed
- Type: highrise, offices
- Location: 303 W. Wall St. Midland
- Coordinates: 31.997385°N 102.076929°W
- Completed: 1978
- Owner: John Morgan; HPG Acquisitions, LP

Height
- Roof: 332 ft (101 m)

Technical details
- Floor count: 24
- Floor area: 329,178 sq ft (30,581.6 m^{2})

Design and construction
- Architect: George Leighton Dahl, Architects and Engineers, Incorporated

Other information
- Parking: Attached parking garage - 850 spaces

The Bank of America Building, originally known as the First National Bank Building, is a highrise located in downtown Midland, Texas. It is designed by Texas architect George Dahl in 1952 and completed in 1978. It is notable for its marble 2-story banking lobby. It remains the tallest building in the city at 24 stories 332 feet (101 m). The building is located at 303 W. Wall St. and currently houses various oil and gas companies as well as Bank of America, Midland.

== See also ==
- List of tallest buildings in Midland, Texas
