= Baltimore Independence School =

Independence School Local 1 High School

Location
- 1250 West 36th Street; Baltimore, Maryland 21211; United States
- Coordinates: 39°19′50″N 76°38′12″W

Information
- School type: Public, Charter
- School district: Baltimore City Public Schools
- Superintendent: Dr. Gregory Thornton [CEO]
- School number: 333
- Principal: Dimitric Roseboro
- Grades: 9–12
- Enrollment: 127 (2014)
- Area: Urban
- Website: www.baltimorecityschools.org/333

Independence School Local 1 is a public charter high school in Baltimore, Maryland, United States. It is a part of the "small-schools" initiative to consolidate large school sizes into smaller learning environments.
