= St. Andrew's Mission Church (Charleston, South Carolina) =

Coordinates: 32°49′9″N 80°2′9″W

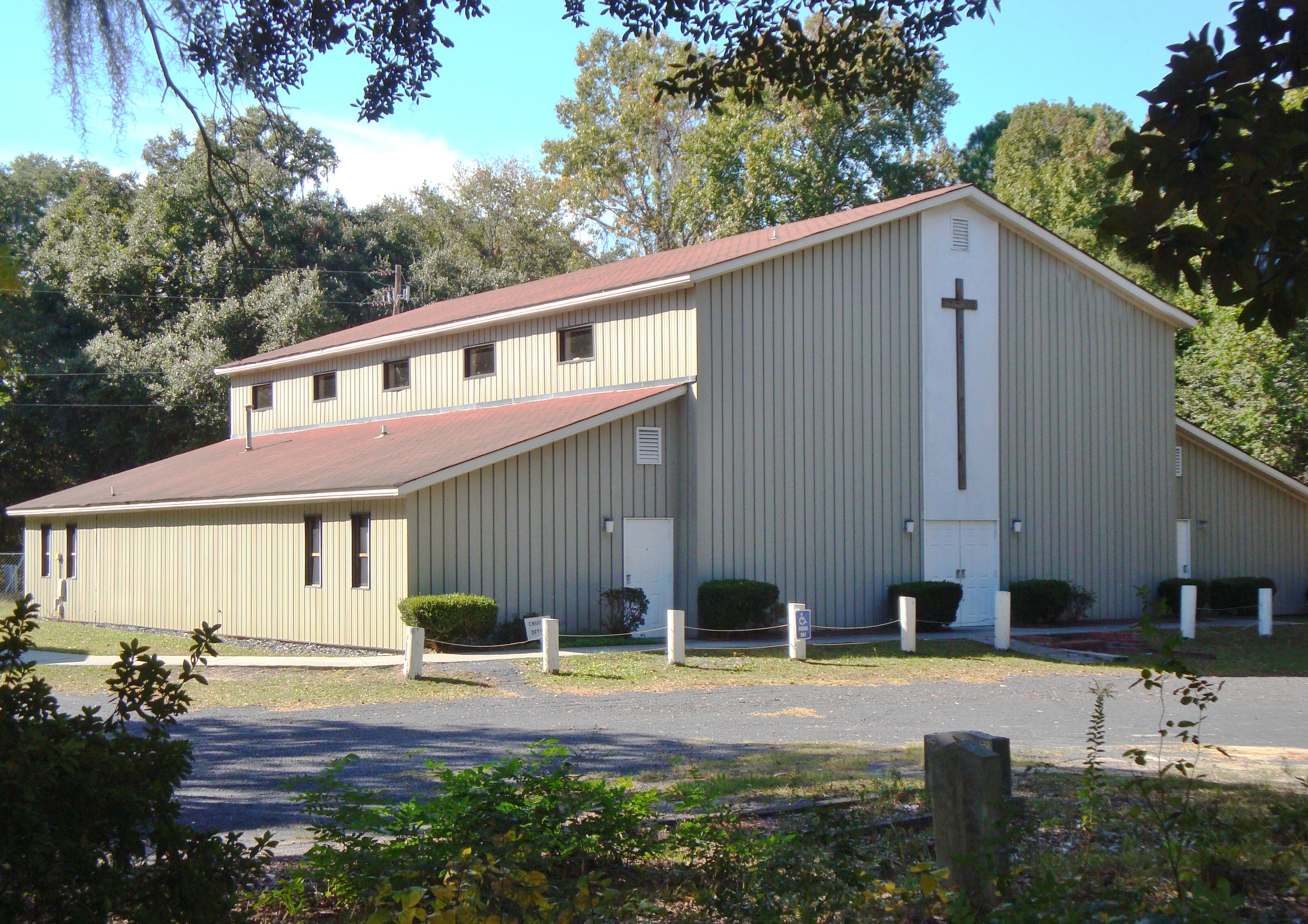
St. Andrew's Mission Church, 2011

Saint Andrew's Mission is a church in the West Ashley area of Charleston, South Carolina, that is affiliated with the Anglican Diocese of South Carolina and the Anglican Church in North America.

== Background ==
St. Andrew's Mission Church was established in 1845 as a chapel on the plantation of Simon J. Magwood in the central part of St. Andrew's Parish, located just west of Charleston along the Ashley River. It was one of three chapels administered by St. Andrew's Parish Church (also called Old St. Andrew's) to bring Christian ministry to enslaved African Americans on parish plantations before the Civil War. The other two were located on the plantations of Nathaniel Russell Middleton (later Samuel G. Barker) at Bolton-on-the-Stono in the southern part of the parish and on John Grimké Drayton's Magnolia-on-the-Ashley in the northern part of the parish. Many Protestant denominations (Methodist, Baptist, Presbyterian, and Episcopal) brought the word of God to the enslaved where they worked and lived. Both Magwood's Chapel, as it was then called, and the parish church were part of the Episcopal Diocese of South Carolina.

== Ministry ==
=== As Magwood's Chapel ===
==== Before the Civil War ====
The Reverend Stuart Hanckel was rector of St. Andrew's when Magwood's Chapel was established. He conducted worship and instruction there every other Sunday, while the owner or a candidate for Holy Orders did so on the other Sundays. That candidate for Holy Orders, John Grimké Drayton, lived not far from the parish church at Magnolia-on-the-Ashley and would become a key figure in the life of Magwood's Chapel.

Reverend Hanckel resigned in 1851. Drayton, who had since been ordained an Episcopal deacon and then priest, replaced him late that year. Reverend Drayton held worship at Magwood's Chapel throughout the year, although the church was open only seasonally from November to May. In the 1850s Drayton baptized 48 enslaved African Americans at Magwood's Chapel, about four times as many as his predecessor at any location. In January 1855 Bishop Thomas F. Davis confirmed 23 enslaved adults there.

==== After the Civil War ====
After the Civil War, freedmen left the white Protestant churches they had attended as slaves "in an exodus of Biblical proportions." One place was different: St. Andrew's Parish, South Carolina. Rev. John Grimké Drayton restarted religious instruction and worship among his prewar African American parishioners – at their request. St. Andrew's Parish Church, one of a few buildings not burned by Union troops and freed slaves, was used as a polling place and was off limits to Drayton until 1876.

"Our progress here is very decided and encouraging," Reverend Drayton reported to the diocese in 1871. "The [black] congregations are large and growing, and the colored people have retained, through all the upheavals of the recent past an unaltered attachment to our Church." That year Bishop Davis made his first visit to the parish since the war, confirming thirteen blacks at Magwood's Chapel. He was impressed with the congregants "most cordial greetings and expressions of affectionate regard; they had never forsaken the Church, and may be considered as permanently related to it." The parish church's white population was virtually nonexistent.

In March 1873 Bishop William B. W. Howe confirmed six more at Magwood's Chapel. "I had feared lately," Drayton said, "that the efforts of political preachers and exhorters would tell fatally upon my chapel congregation. But [I] am glad to say that after a full investigation and a face to face talk with my people, I find them determined to abide in the communion of the Church in which they have so long worshipped." The following year he related that "the devotion of my people to our Church continues firm and unabated. They are with rare exceptions, very poor; yet they are doing what they can to aid in restoring our places of worship, and in sending the Gospel to those at home and abroad. May our Church never neglect to foster those who, amid so many, so peculiar, so strong temptations to leave her have yet remained steadfast."

Despite inclement weather, Drayton wrote in 1875, "the interest of my people has not flagged, and, with great distances to overcome, they have continued 'the assembling of themselves together.'" Magwood's Chapel had fallen into disrepair but was restored "as to greatly eclipse [its] former state." After Barker's Chapel was destroyed by fire in 1876, those who had attended services there and who could make the journey now used Magwood's Chapel. The spirit of Drayton's parishioners never wavered in the face of hardship. "The last summer's drought," he reported in 1876, "brought great distress and suffering among my poor people, but they have continued to give in spite of their poverty".

Drayton praised his black congregation to anyone who would listen. "Some of our brethren warned us, not long since, that the exodus of our colored worshippers was near at hand," he reported to the diocese. "I wish that they could come and spend a Sunday with us." Another 26 were confirmed at the chapel in 1880.

Magwood's Chapel was nearly lost when the property was unexpectedly sold. A deed had never been formally recorded for it when the chapel was built under Stuart Hanckel's tenure. Reverend Drayton borrowed money from a friend and bought the property back. The deed showed that the chapel was made of wood and measured 45 by 20 feet (900 square feet), slightly smaller than the nave at St. Andrew's Parish Church. Drayton's black congregation repaid him in full in only two years. "The day upon which I took up the deed which made the Chapel and its surroundings theirs and their childrens," he said, "was a day of rejoicing indeed, and with hearts aglow with gratitude they girded up their loins to work yet more vigorously for the Saviour. Poor in this world, they are rich in faith and works." St. Andrew's Mission Church can date its beginnings to the establishment of Magwood's Chapel in 1845, but it can remember 1880 when the chapel became its own.

After Bishop Howe visited Magwood's Chapel in January 1882 to preach and hold confirmation, he praised the people for their financial generosity. The next year a diocesan committee commended the giving levels of the black congregants of St. Andrew's Parish. "The attention of the Church is called to the very striking fact," the committee said, "that the colored members of Rev. Mr. Drayton's charge have again been among the leading contributors to Missions in this Diocese. They have given, as the Rev. Mr. Drayton says, from their hard earned incomes, out of their poverty, $121.76 to spread the gospel in this Diocese, and to build up this Church, ranking fifth. When we learn such a fact, thoughtful men will pause and consider."

From 1879 to 1883, black communicants in the parish outnumbered whites more than eight-to-one (an average of 161 to 19) and accounted for one-fourth of the total in the entire diocese.

Drayton had suffered from tuberculosis his entire adult life, and now in his seventies, his condition was worsening. In 1889 the illness incapacitated him, and Bishop Howe turned over care of the chapel to the Reverends J. M. H. Pollard (priest) and E. N. Hollings (deacon). In March 1889 the bishop confirmed fifteen there.

=== Established as St. Andrew's Mission Church ===
Magwood's Chapel continued to flourish under its new leadership. Shortly after Drayton's death in 1891 the chapel was designated a mission church and given its own name, St. Andrew's, Berkeley County, and then St. Andrew's, Charleston County. St. Andrew's Mission was administered through the diocese. The Reverends Pollard, Hollings, and F. I. A. Bennett served the church in the last decade of the nineteenth century. Black churches established after the Civil War became community centers for their people. So it was with St. Andrew's Mission. It held not only Sunday worship but offered a variety of instructional opportunities, with a Sunday school, day school, and industrial school each serving about 150 students. Reverend Pollard opened a dispensary on the grounds, the only place where the large black population in the parish could find medical treatment besides crossing the toll bridge into Charleston. By the end of the century, the value of St. Andrew's Mission's property far exceeded that of the parish church and glebe.

=== Ministry at St. Andrew's Mission Church through the Diocese ===
St. Andrew's Mission prospered under a series of diocesan archdeacons who aided black Episcopal churches in their development. The first was the Reverend Edmund N. Joyner, who served in this capacity for sixteen years beginning in 1892. During his tenure there were 32 missions with 19 day schools with more than 1,200 students. The Reverend A. E. Cornish was next appointed archdeacon (1908–1910), followed by the Rev. Erasmus L. Baskervill (1914–1937). On Baskervill's death, Bishop Albert Sidney Thomas said, "A man of broad sympathies, singularly free from prejudices of any kind, his benign influence reached far and wide. . . . His stalwart figure, his pleasing personality, his wise counsel, will be sadly missed." Baskervill's son Louis was ordained an Episcopal priest and in 1939 helped establish Camp Baskervill at Pawleys Island, a summer camp and conference center for black Episcopalians, in memory of his father. In 1942 Charleston County took over the administration of the day school of St. Andrew's Mission.

The Reverend Stephen B. Mackey served as archdeacon from 1944 to 1977. In 1945, St. Andrew's Mission's centennial year, the church underwent a thorough restoration. A new parish hall was built and dedicated in 1960. "Of the many unsung heroes this Diocese has produced," Bishop Gray Temple said on Mackey's retirement, "Steve Mackey stands high among them. His whole ministry has been given to South Carolina by choice and at a time of great change. For years, as Archdeacon for colored work, he was the Bishop, without portfolio, for our negro congregations. For years, he was the major, if not the only, link between the black and the white congregations."

The Reverend John B. Richards succeeded Mackey as archdeacon for two years, followed by the Rev. William C. Weaver in 1979. The following year the Mission was destroyed by fire. A new (the current) church was completed and dedicated in September 1981. Reverend Weaver resigned in July 1983 and was replaced by the Rev. Cornelius White, who served for four years.

The Rev. Stephen Scott Kirk became priest in charge of St. Andrew's Mission in 1988. Reverend Kirk, a graduate of North Carolina A&T and Yale Divinity School, brought renewed energy to the church. The Rev. James Kowbeidu, a Liberian, served as vicar of St. Andrew's Mission until 2004, when he was succeeded by the Rev. James Yarsiah, another Liberian, who served from 2004 to 2011. Reverend Yarsiah left to become chaplain at Voorhees College and vicar of St. Philip's Episcopal Church in Denmark, South Carolina.

The Rev. Dr. James S. (Jimmy) Gallant III followed Reverend Yarsiah to St. Andrew's Mission from St. Paul's, Orangeburg. Reverend Gallant, a former member of the Charleston City Council, had served as a long-time police chaplain and a chaplain at the 1996 Atlanta Summer Olympics, at youth detention centers, nursing homes, prisons, fire houses, police stations, hospitals, and inner city streets, and as an evangelist around the world. For "his devoted and passionate ministry to his community, his church, and his God," the South Carolina House of Representatives in 2014 formally recognized Reverend Jimmy Gallant.

== St. Andrew's Mission Church and St. Andrew's Parish Church ==
The two churches remained apart in the segregated South of the mid-twentieth century. Toward the end of Reverend Mackey's long tenure at St. Andrew's Mission, Bishop Temple discussed with the Reverend John Gilchrist, the rector of St. Andrew's, the possibility of either St. Andrew's assuming responsibility for the mission or hiring an assistant minister to serve it. The St. Andrew's vestry investigated the implications, but Reverend Mackey continued as priest in charge.

Not long after the Rev. Marshall Huey was elected rector of Old St. Andrew's in 2006, he and Reverend Yarsiah began exploring ways of bringing their churches together based on their common history, albeit marred by slavery and segregation. One of the first things they did was to jointly hold an Easter sunrise service at Drayton Hall in 2008. Four years later the location was moved to Magnolia Plantation and Gardens, ancestral home of the Rev. John Grimké Drayton. Easter sunrise service continues as an annual event, attracting as many as seven hundred worshipers. Reverend Gallant frequently preaches there, illustrating how a black minister now leads worship at a place that was once a slave plantation.

Another attempt to link the churches came with the establishment of worship and fellowship during Lent. Weekly Lenten series events rotated between the churches, so parishioners could share with one another their venues in hospitality. These renewed ties were the subject of a 2010 article by Charleston Post and Courier columnist Ken Burger, who attended one of these gatherings. "While we have come a long way in race relations," Burger said, "churches remain the most segregated institutions in our community". Here he saw nearly all-white and all-black congregations come together in friendship. "When heads were bowed," Burger wrote, "black and white hands were joined in thanks, not just for the food, but for the fellowship between two cultures reaching out to understand each other. . . . Here along Church Creek in West Ashley, these two churches are . . exploring their similarities rather than their differences."

On May 1, 2016, Old St. Andrew's celebrated the 200th anniversary of Reverend Drayton's birth with a month-long series of events. A lecture series on Drayton's horticultural and ministerial life, including his ministry to his black parishioners, was held on four successive Sundays at the church, followed by commemoration weekend featuring a traditional lowcountry supper under the oaks, with the Voorhees College Gospel Choir singing; remarks on "The Rev. Drayton's St. Andrew's Parish Church"; and a Festal Eucharist officiated by the Reverends Huey and Gallant, followed by a reception.

The long history between St. Andrew's Mission and Old St. Andrew's Parish Church was the subject of a 2018 book published jointly by the churches, "In My Trials, Lord, Walk with Me": What an Antebellum Parish Register Reveals about Race and Reconciliation. Based on the discovery of the parish church's original register from 1830 to 1859, more than eighty percent of which listed slave baptisms, slave confirmations, slave marriages, and slave burials, the book explores ministry to enslaved African Americans on plantations in South Carolina and St. Andrew's Parish, in particular. It traces the linkage between St. Andrew's Mission and St. Andrew's Parish Church, established in slavery, enduring segregation, now connecting in faith.

As Reverend Marshall Huey of Old St. Andrew's said in the book's foreword, "In my Christian journey I am blessed to be part of a church family that encompasses not only Old St. Andrew's, but my brothers and sisters at St. Andrew's Mission. . . God will use this book in redemptive ways that we cannot now imagine. That is how God works through us flawed humans who do such things as enslave each other physically, emotionally, or otherwise." Reverend Gallant added that what's happening in these churches "isn't by happenstance. God has prepared this for our two St. Andrew's churches. . . . In my heart, I believe that God's put us together to send a signal that there's one church – not just St. Andrew's Mission Church or just St. Andrew's Parish Church – and that's the church of Jesus Christ. It's so special that the Lord's chosen one black congregation, a mission church, and one white congregation, a parish church, to make this community look whole, look colorless, look seamless, look like the Holy Spirit, who doesn't have a color to it."

In 2012 the Episcopal Diocese of South Carolina disaffiliated from the Episcopal Church over matters of Christian doctrine, morality, and polity. A decade-long court battle ensued over the ownership of individual church properties. The South Carolina Supreme Court ruled that the Episcopal Church and not St. Andrew's Mission owned its property. In the final settlement, however, the Episcopal Church reversed course and gave the deed to the Mission. On November 30, 2022, St. Andrew's Day, Bishop Charles F. (Chip) Edgar III of the Anglican Diocese of South Carolina formally presented the deed to the Rev. Jimmy Gallant and his lay leaders at a ceremony held at Old St. Andrew's. It was 1880 all over again, despair followed by euphoria, history repeating itself one-hundred forty-two years later.

== See also ==
- Old St. Andrew's Parish Church
- John Grimké Drayton
