= Runnymede Plantation =

Coordinates: 32°52′56″N 80°05′37″W

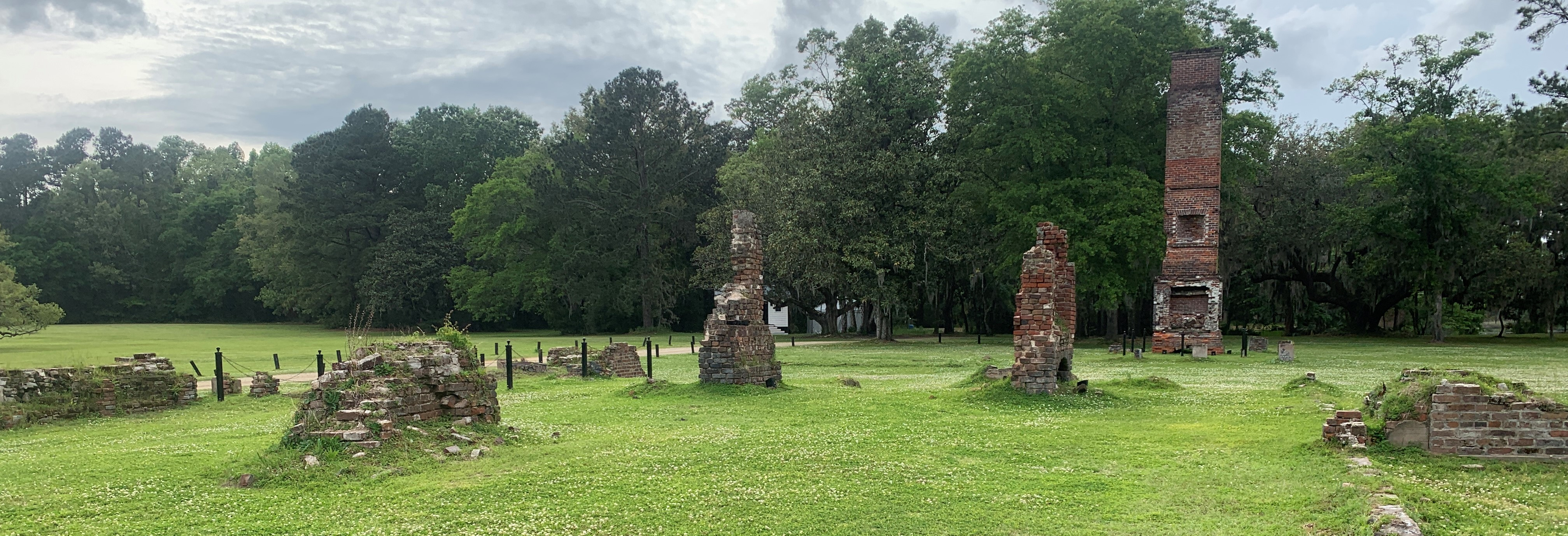
Both the second and third house on the site had been built on the foundations of the original house. The third house burned to the ground in 2002 leaving only some brick ruins.

Runnymede was a plantation home at 3760 Ashley River Road near Charleston, South Carolina. The land borders Magnolia Gardens to the southeast.

The plantation existed at least by 1705 when John Cattell acquired the tract. John Julius Pringle acquired the plantation in 1795 after a fire destroyed the original house. He changed the name of the plantation from Greenville to Susan's Place (a reference to his wife), and still later, changed the named to Runnymede. The name is sometimes spelled Runnymeade. During the Civil War, Union forces burned the second house, and it was replaced in 1882 with a third house by Charles C. Pinckney. Both the second and third houses were built on the foundations of the first house.

In 1898, Runnymede, which was 1475 acres at the time, was sold by order of the court, and Mrs. C.C. Pinckney bought the plantation for $200, but the land was subject to a $12,000 mortgage and also a mining lease.

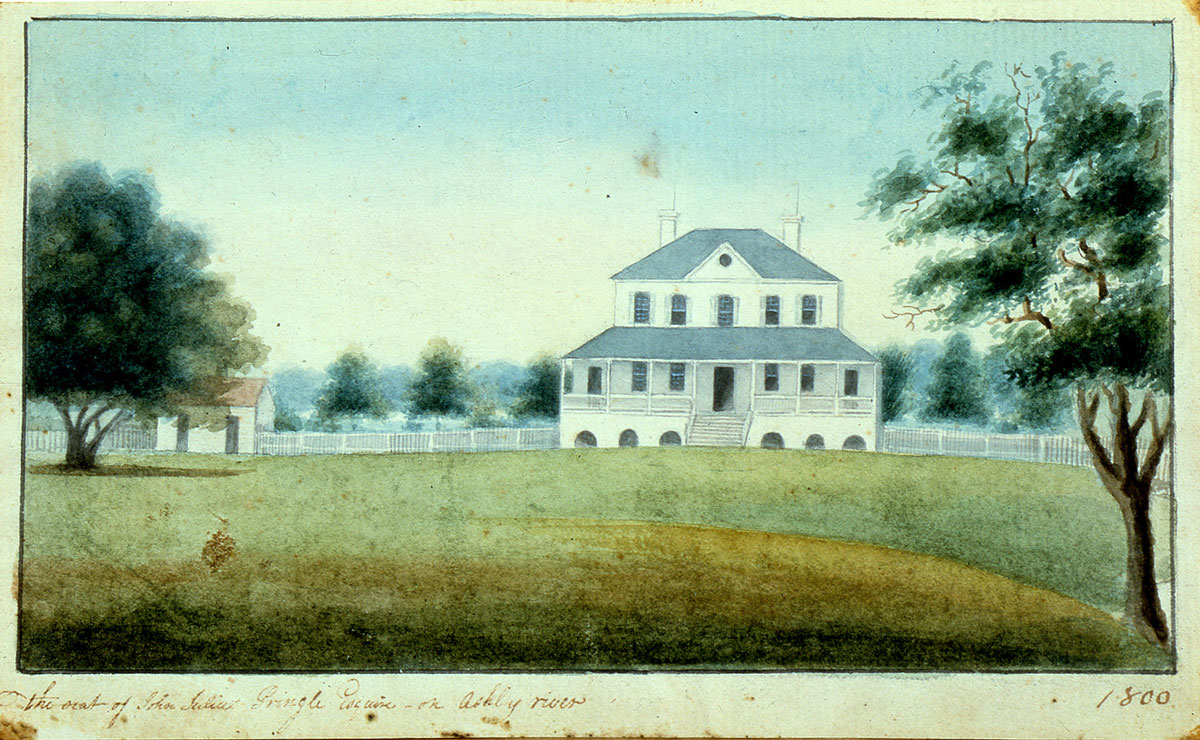
Charles Fraser painted the second of three houses on the site in 1800 when it was the home of John Julius Pringle.

The house burned on September 10, 2002. Both the main house and a detached, two-story kitchen house to the north were destroyed. The kitchen's chimney is now the tallest structure on the land. The investigation into the fire closed in November 2002 without finding a cause. The plantation had been bought by nearby property owners Floyd and Shirley Whitfield in 1997.

The house was open to the public infrequently but was open at times including 1919, 1929, and 1938. Guests included 20th century painter William Posey Silva.

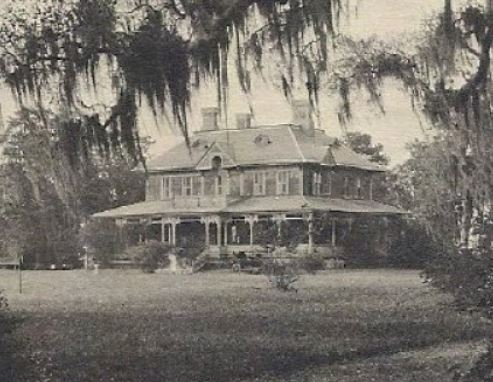
After the second house at Runnymede Plantation was destroyed during the Civil War, a similar house was erected in 1882 by Charles Cotesworth Pinckney; it burned down in 2002.
