= John Grimké Drayton =

- Born: May 1, 1816; Charleston, South Carolina
- Died: April 2, 1891 (aged 74); Summerville, South Carolina
- Burial place: Cemetery at St. John in the Wilderness Church, Flat Rock, North Carolina
- Education: Southworth School, Charleston, South Carolina; College of Charleston; General Theological Seminary, New York City
- Occupations: Plantation owner and episcopal priest
- Spouse: Julia Ewing (m. 1840)
- Parents: Thomas Smith Grimké (father); Sarah Daniel Drayton (mother)
- Relatives: Thomas Drayton Grimké Drayton (brother); Theodore Dehon Grimké (brother); James McBride Grimké (brother); Thomas Smith Grimké Jr. (brother); Benjamin Grimké (brother); Sarah Moore Grimké (aunt); Angelina Grimké (aunt)

John Grimké Drayton (May 1, 1816 – April 2, 1891) was a nineteenth-century planter and priest in Charleston, South Carolina. He was a horticulturalist at Magnolia Plantation and Gardens on the Ashley River and an Episcopal priest who served nearby Old St. Andrew's Parish Church for forty years.

== Early life ==
John Drayton Grimké was born on May 1, 1816, to Thomas Smith Grimké and Sarah Daniel Drayton. He was the second of six children. His father was a renowned attorney and state senator whose real calling, he believed, was to the ministry. Pursuing that vocation, however, was overruled by his father, the acclaimed Charleston attorney and politician, John Faucheraud Grimké. His mother's parents owned a large plantation west of Charleston, Magnolia-on-the-Ashley (now known as Magnolia Plantation and Gardens). His aunts were Sarah Moore Grimké and Angelina Grimké, who had left Charleston as young adults when John was still young and became noted abolitionists.

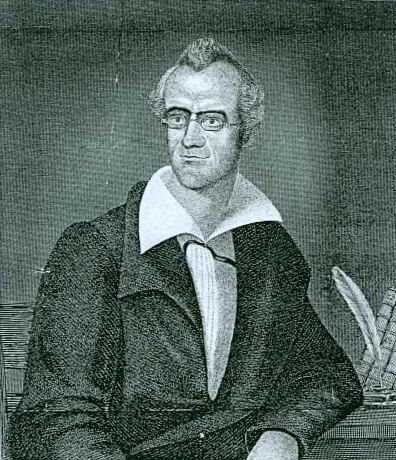
Thomas Smith Grimké, 1830s

== Education ==
John attended the Southworth School in Charleston, and later the College of Charleston, where he graduated in 1833. He studied and traveled abroad in 1836. The following year he became a candidate for Holy orders in the Episcopal Diocese of South Carolina. In 1838–39 he enrolled at General Theological Seminary in New York City. On his return to Charleston, he continued his studies for the ministry under the Reverend James Stuart Hanckel, rector of St. Andrew's Parish Church just south of Magnolia, and Bishop Nathaniel Bowen.

== Inherits Magnolia ==
Magnolia has been in the Drayton family since 1679. John's grandfather, Thomas Drayton, had willed the plantation to his son William Henry, on the condition that he marry and produce a son. When Thomas died in 1825, and childless William Henry died the following year, the property went to John's older brother Thomas – provided that he changed his surname from Grimké to Drayton. He did, and he inherited the 1,872 acre Magnolia plantation. Thomas died in a hunting accident on the property in 1836. John heard of his brother's death while he was in Europe and returned home. He was next in line to inherit Magnolia provided he also changed his surname, which he did. John Grimké became John Grimké Drayton. Throughout his life, he considered himself a Drayton and not a Grimké-Drayton, since he signed his letters "J. G. Drayton."

== Marries Julia Ewing ==
On his way to New York City and the seminary, Drayton stopped in Philadelphia to visit family. There he met Julia Ewing, whom he fell in love with. She came from a prominent family and led an active social life. The couple were married on July 9, 1840, and moved to Magnolia soon afterwards. The couple divided their time between Magnolia and the Grimké family's Charleston home at 42 South Bay fronting the harbor. Today the site is a national historic landmark known as the William Gibbes House located at 64 South Battery.

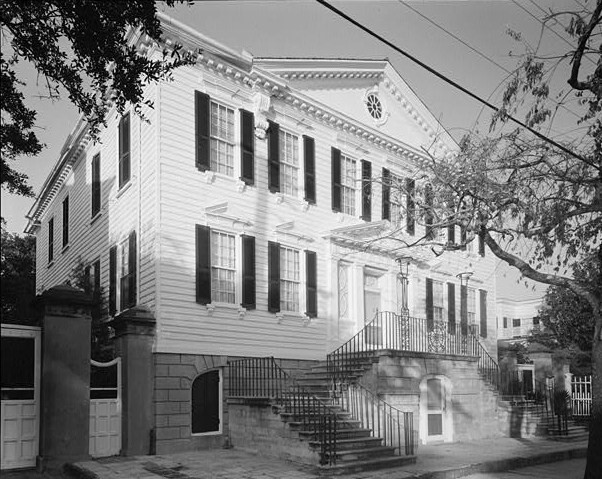
William Gibbes House, Charleston

== Contracts Tuberculosis ==
Just after his marriage John became ill with tuberculosis. Where he contracted it is unknown, although he may have picked it up in the cold, damp, crowded living conditions at seminary. His granddaughter Marie Clinton Hastie remembered that John was troubled with a "weak throat and chest". His doctor prescribed a treatment common to tuberculosis patients in the first half of the nineteenth century: exercise and farming. "The dilemma was frustrating and ongoing," wrote Sheila Rothman in a study of tuberculosis and its social effects, "how to reconcile an invalid's moral and medical obligations with personal ambitions and goals. Was it necessary for those who yearned to become ministers or teachers to take up farming?" That is exactly what John Grimké Drayton did.

Tuberculosis plagued Drayton for his entire adult lifetime. After he became active in ministry, he recounted numerous times that illness had limited his ability to preach, teach, and conduct worship. The severity of the illness intensified as he aged.

== Develops Magnolia's Gardens ==
Drayton's treatment plan was "digging in the dirt". He also wanted to please his new wife, who found it difficult to adjust to such an isolated, rural life after leaving Philadelphia. His goal: "to create an earthly paradise in which my dear Julia may forever forget Philadelphia and her desire to return there."

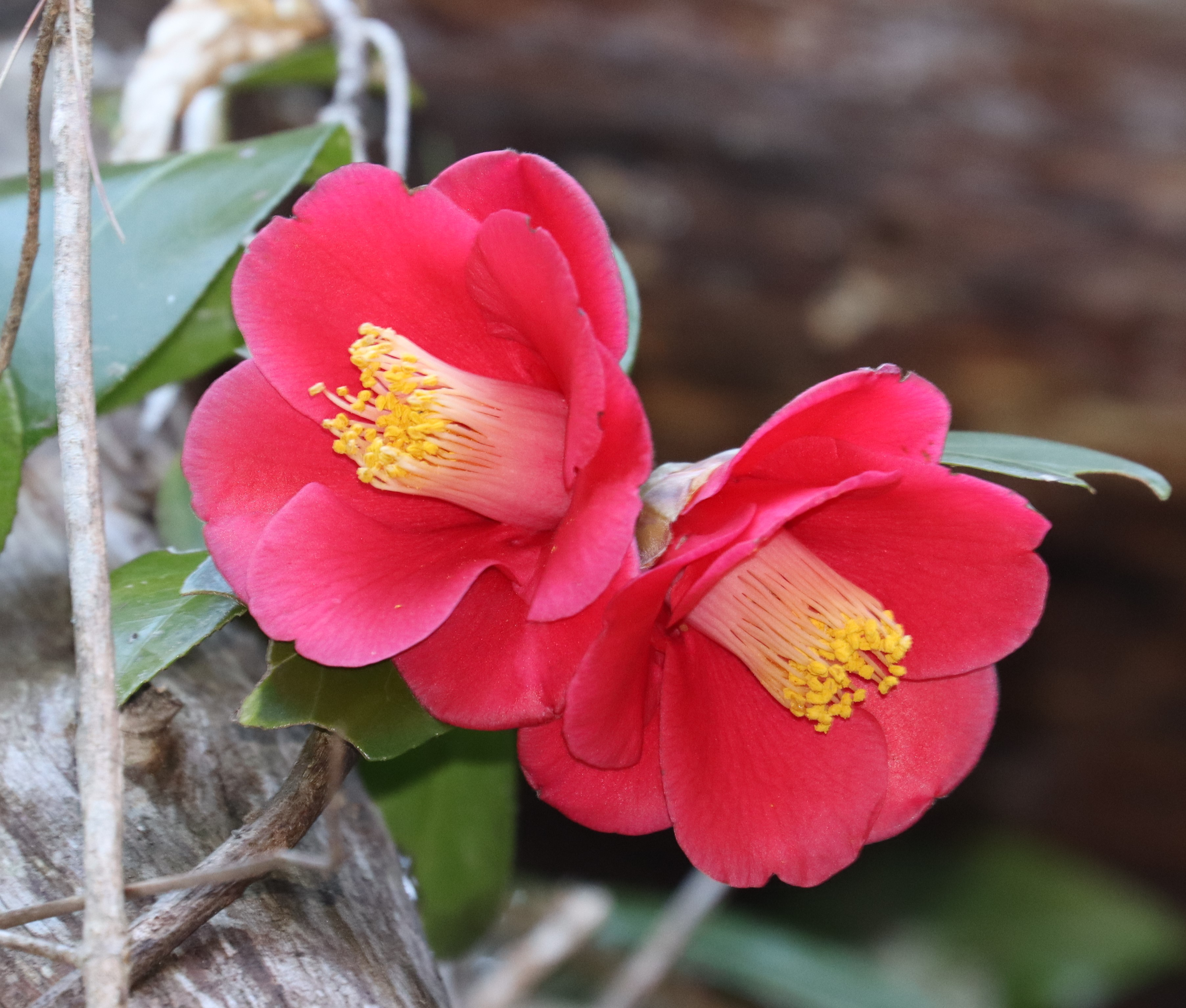
Camellia japonica

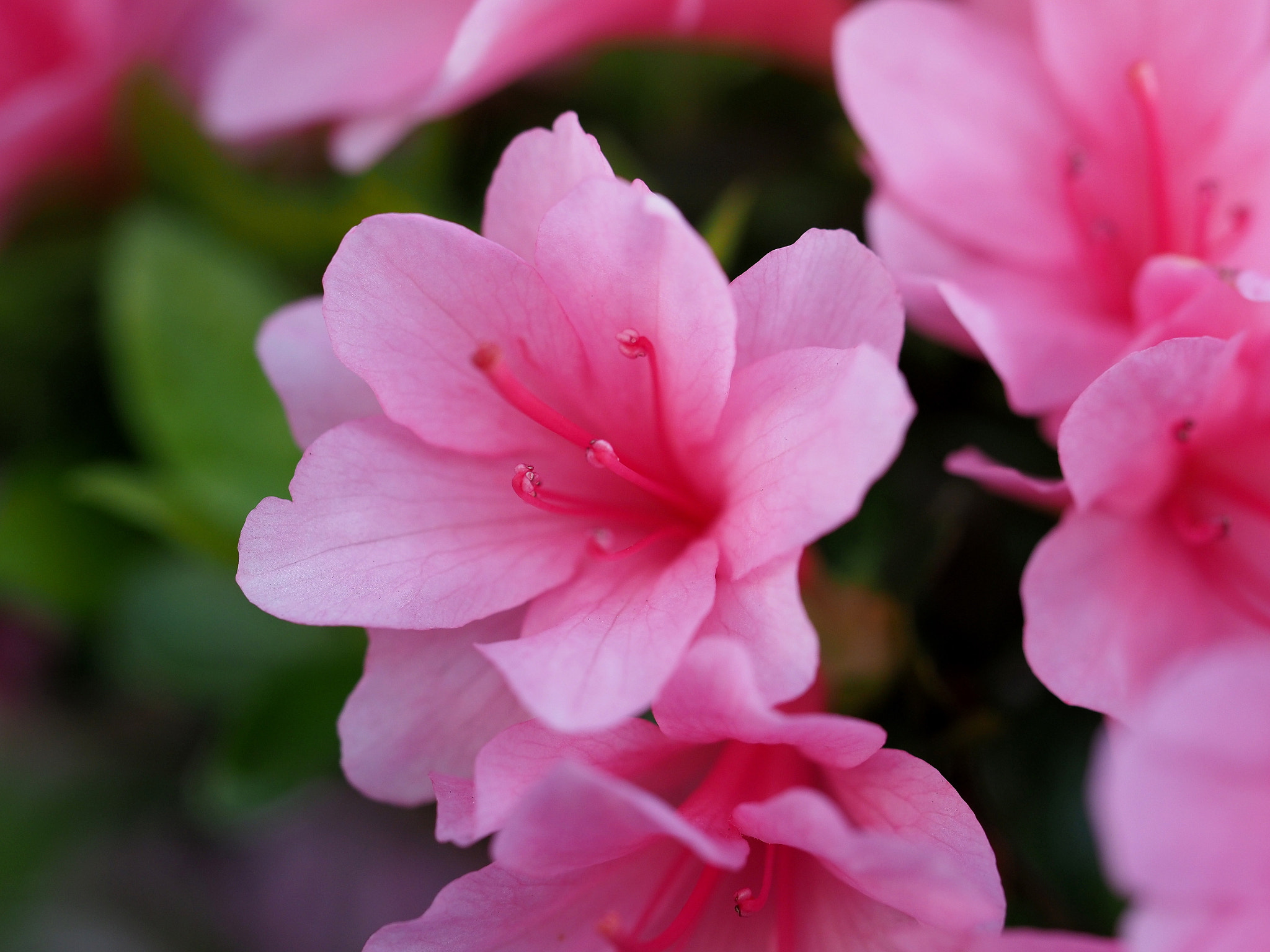
Azalea Indica

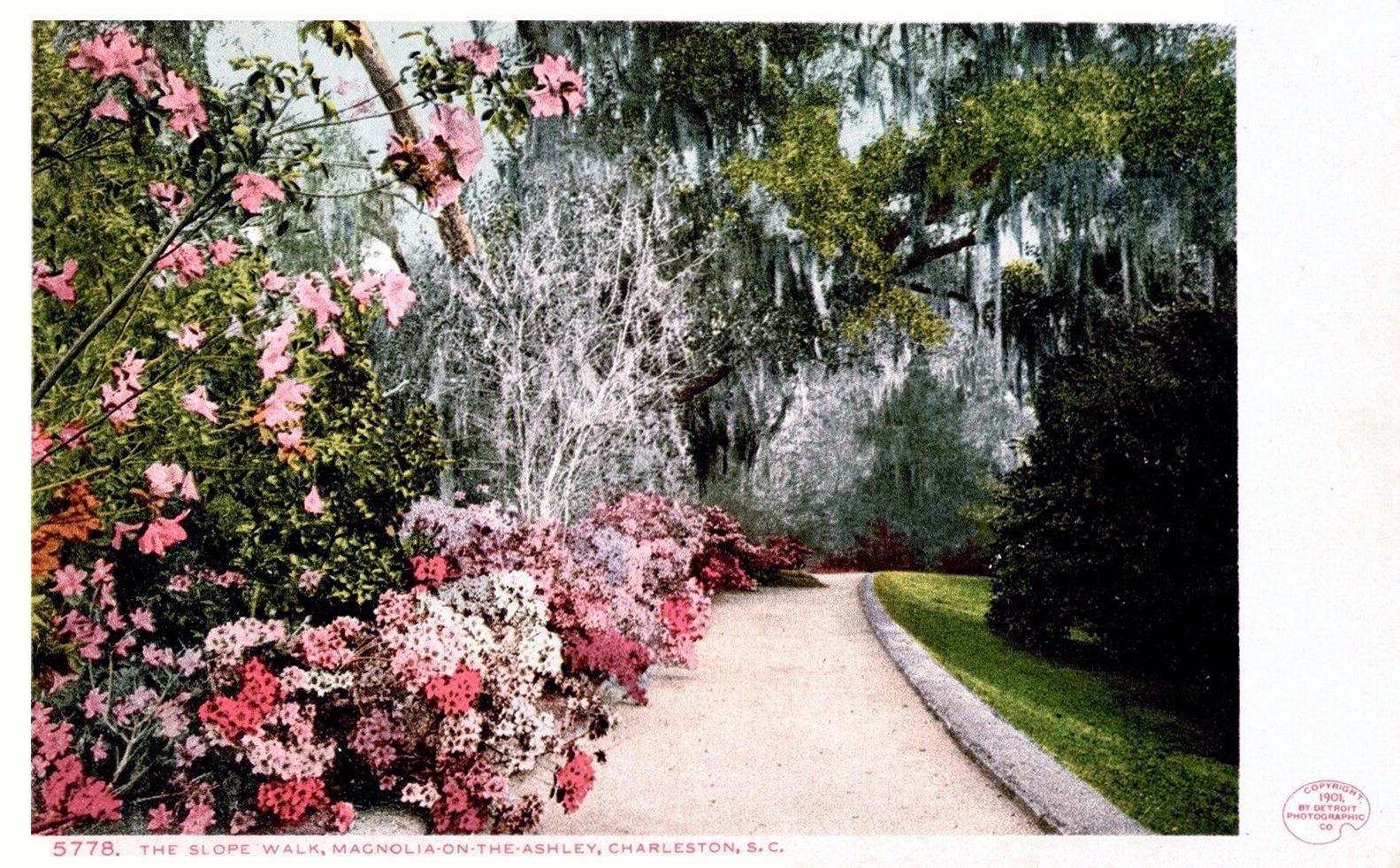
The Slope Walk, Magnolia Plantation, 1901

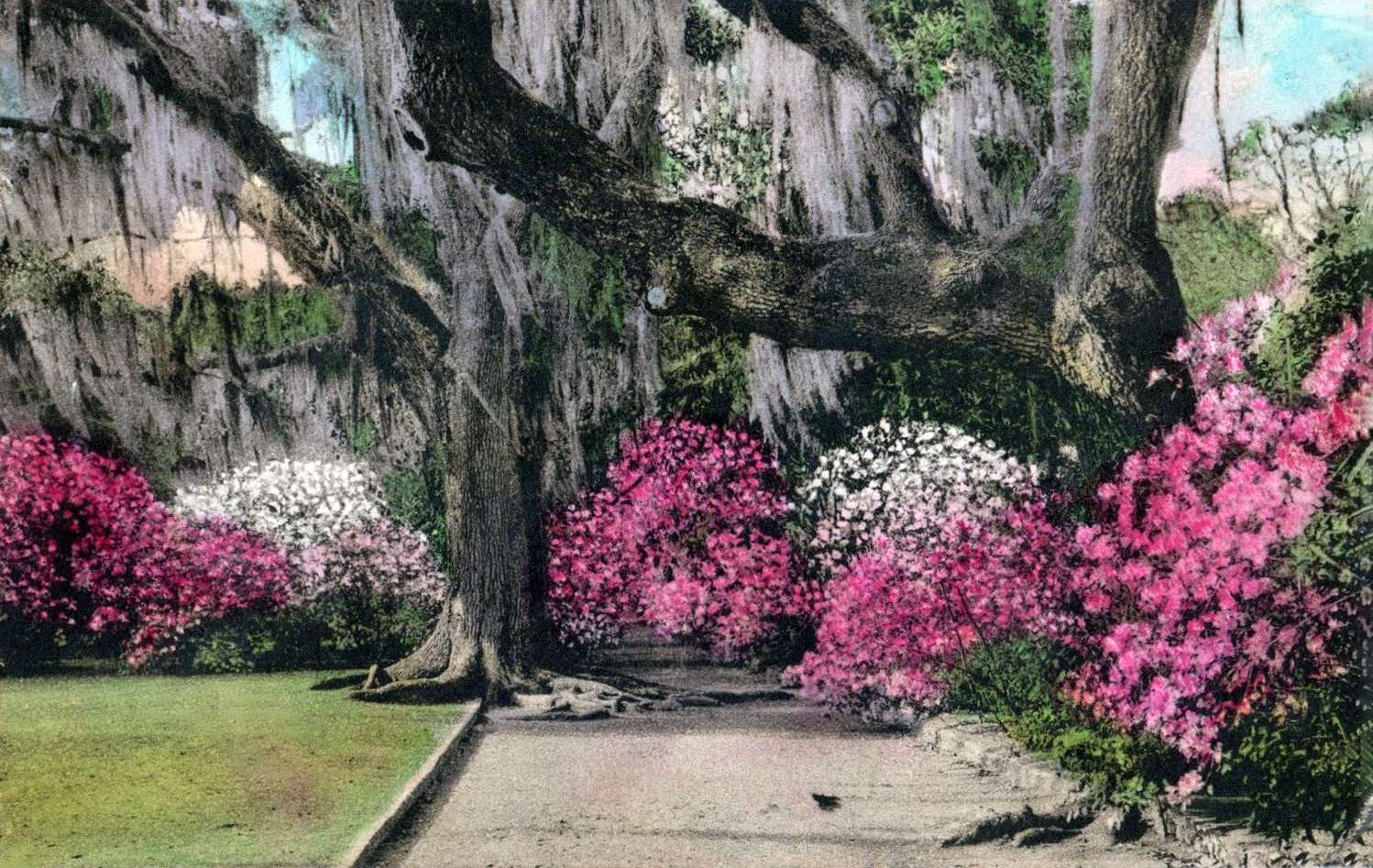
Magnolia Gardens, 1925

Drayton's focus now became rebuilding Magnolia's deteriorating gardens and postponing his ordination. He chose a garden format popular in the mid-nineteenth century called the Romantic style, a natural, informal approach to design and plantings. Drayton's "picturesque" style of Romanticism, "expressed by striking, irregular spirited forms", was a stark contrast to the formal, geometric style of nearby Middleton Place and a naturalistic expression at Drayton Hall, where "man exert[ed] control over the natural environment." Drayton's Magnolia became an innovative showcase for unbridled natural beauty, "which allowed man and nature to co-exist. Wildness was glorified and enhanced, not tamed." In the 1840s Drayton was one of the first people in the United States to plant Camellia japonica (Japanese camellia) outdoors on a large-scale and grow Azalea Indica (Indian azalea) outdoors. His vision and genius turned Magnolia Plantation and Gardens into one of the world's most impressive, cultivated landscapes.

John Grimké Drayton's Magnolia was not only a beautiful gardens but also a working farm. The 1860 agricultural census showed that Magnolia produced 13,000 lb. (6.5 tons) of rice, one of the few areas where rice was grown in St. Andrew's Parish; 2,000 lb. (1 ton) of cotton, a minor producer; 600 bu. (42,000 lb. or 21 tons) of corn; 20 bu. (1,200 lb. or .6 tons) of Irish potatoes; and 40 bu. (1,120 lb. or .56 tons) of peas and beans.

None of this gardening or farming would have been possible without the labor of Magnolia's enslaved men, women, and children. The 1850 Census listed 45 in 1850 and 41 in 1860.

== Raises a Family ==
John and Julia Drayton had two daughters. Julia was born on October 30, 1848, and Ella, on March 10, 1853. Julia would marry William S. Hastie Jr. and settle at Linwood, in Summerville, in 1883. Julia would inherit Magnolia on her father's death and take great care of it. She died on November 3, 1920. Ella would marry Edward Reed Memminger, whose indifferent approach to Christianity infuriated Reverend Drayton, who attended their wedding but did not officiate it. She died on February 23, 1926.

== Begins His Ministry ==
For more than a decade, Drayton postponed his entry into the ministry to recover his health and focus on his gardens. He was ordained a deacon in the Episcopal Church at St. Andrew's Parish Church on March 16, 1851, and a priest seven months later at Grace Church, Charleston. Later that year Reverend Drayton replaced Stuart Hanckel at St. Andrew's and became the church's eleventh rector. He would also become its longest serving rector, for forty years until his death in 1891.

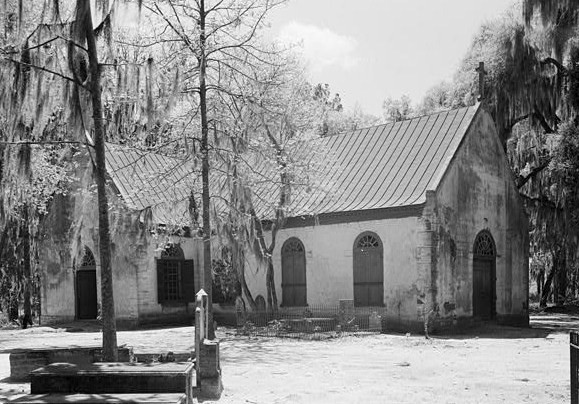
Old St. Andrew's Parish Church, 1940

He inherited a parish church whose best days seemed to be behind it. St. Andrew's was one of the wealthiest parishes in British North America before the American Revolution, due to rice, indigo, and the plantation slave system that made it possible. But the parish suffered severe economic decline after the war, and the parish church felt the effects. The church was open only seasonally, from about November through May when the weather was cooler. When Stuart Hanckel arrived in 1838, there were only 17 white communicants. When John Grimké Drayton arrived in 1851, the number of white communicants had risen to 26, but the 69 black communicants outnumbered them by more than two-to-one.

Stuart Hanckel had begun a ministry to the enslaved on the plantations in St. Andrew's Parish. Three chapels had been built for slave worship and instruction: at Nathaniel Russell Middleton's (later Samuel G. Barker's) plantation on the Stono River in the southern part of the parish (1845), at Simon J. Magwood's plantation in the center of the parish (also 1845), and at John Grimké Drayton's Magnolia (1850). Drayton took this ministry to new heights. During the 1850s, the number of white communicants remained low (an annual average of 21), dwarfed by the number of black communicants (an annual average of 119, or five times as many as white). Drayton used all four venues as worship centers. From 1856 to 1860 he held an annual average of 20 services at the parish church, 29 at Magnolia Chapel, 12 at Magwood's Chapel, and 7 at Barker's Chapel. He wrote to a Delaware friend and Episcopal priest in 1858 that "My black Roses are prospering."

The antebellum parish register, begun in 1830, further illustrates Reverend Drayton's focused ministry to the enslaved. Of the more than two hundred baptisms, confirmations, marriages, and burials he performed in the 1850s, more than 90 percent involved the enslaved.

Drayton's tenure before the Civil War was also marked by one of the most comprehensive renovations of a "very dilapidated" parish church since its founding in 1706. Col. William Izard Bull, a prominent parishioner who lived at Ashley Hall Plantation south of the church, installed new pews, a new pulpit and reading desk, cast iron railing around the pulpit, desk, and altar, a new sandstone paver floor, and two marble monuments, one to his Izard family and one to the Bulls. He also had the walls painted to cover cherubs which had previously been added, "all to the horror of grandma and the other ladies".

In addition to his work at St. Andrew's, Reverend Drayton filled in for absent clergy at St. Peter's Church, Charleston (1857–60), St. Philip's Church, Charleston (1858), and beginning in 1855, St. John in the Wilderness in Flat Rock, North Carolina, from June to early November.

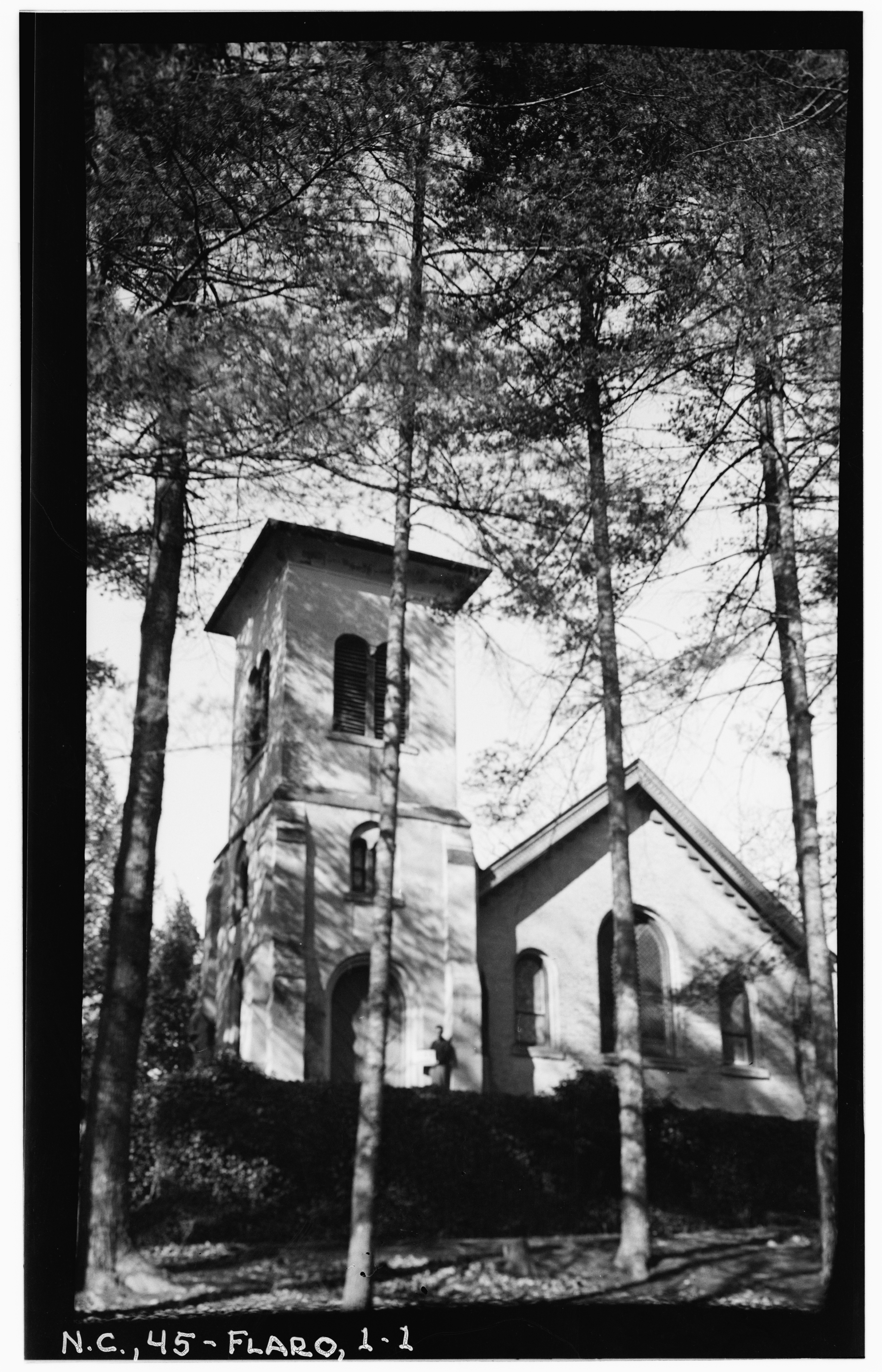
Church of St. John in the-Wilderness, Flat Rock, 1934

== Builds a Home in Flat Rock ==
Flat Rock, North Carolina, was a haven for wealthy Charlestonians who sought relief from the lowcountry's heat, humidity, and insects. It was informally called "Little Charleston in the Mountains." John Grimké Drayton first visited Flat Rock in 1853 and a few years later built a summer home and gardens there, which he called Ravenswood. It was situated next to Rock Hill, the home of Christopher Gustavus Memminger, who would become the Confederacy's first Secretary of the Treasury.

== Endures Civil War ==
The Civil War caused much instability and disruption within St. Andrew's Parish. Drayton continued to travel to Flat Rock in the summer, where in June 1863 he was elected rector of St. John in the Wilderness for the summer months. The following year he witnessed the confirmation of his slave Adam, a key figure in building the gardens at Magnolia, at St. John's. As Union troops and freed slaves marched toward Charleston from the west, Drayton held his last worship service at St. Andrew's on Sunday, February 12, 1865, days before Charleston was evacuated. He left for Flat Rock and left Adam in charge of Magnolia.

Once the war was over and it was safe for Drayton to return, Adam walked the 260 miles from Magnolia to Flat Rock to retrieve him. Drayton found his home at Magnolia burned, but his gardens spared. Every residence but one along the west bank of the Ashley River (Drayton Hall) was burned by Union troops. The parish church was spared. "The demon of civil war was let loose in this Parish," Drayton reported to the diocese. "But three residences exist in the whole space between the Ashley and Stono Rivers [about seven miles]. . . . It must be many years before the congregation can return in sufficient numbers to rebuild their homes and restore the worship of God."

== Rebuilds Magnolia ==
With Magnolia burned, Drayton and his wife lived at the Grimké residence on the Charleston Battery. In 1869 Drayton sold nearly 80 percent of Magnolia (1,482 acres), everything west of Ashley River Road, to the Charleston Mining and Manufacturing Company for $25,000, which allowed him to rebuild his house and gardens. He also allowed phosphate mining on his remaining property. Four years later Drayton had a small, pre-Revolution summer house in Summerville taken apart and moved by barge down the Ashley River, where it was rebuilt on the ruined house's foundation, so he and his family could again live on the property. The Great Charleston Earthquake of 1886 damaged the walls of the house, but these were repaired.

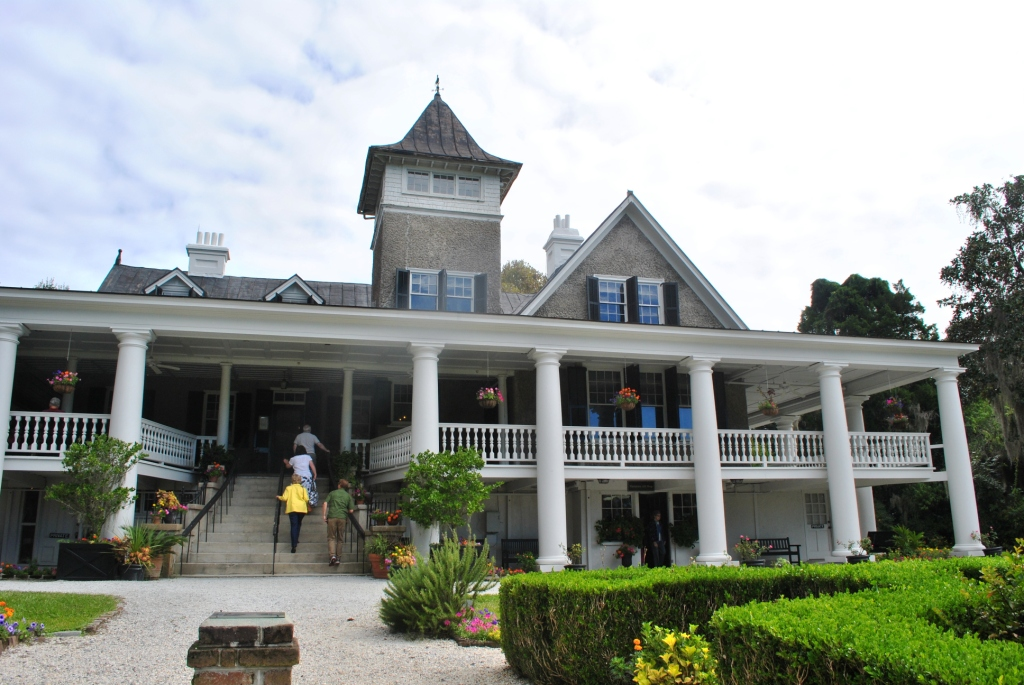
House at Magnolia Plantation and Gardens, 2013

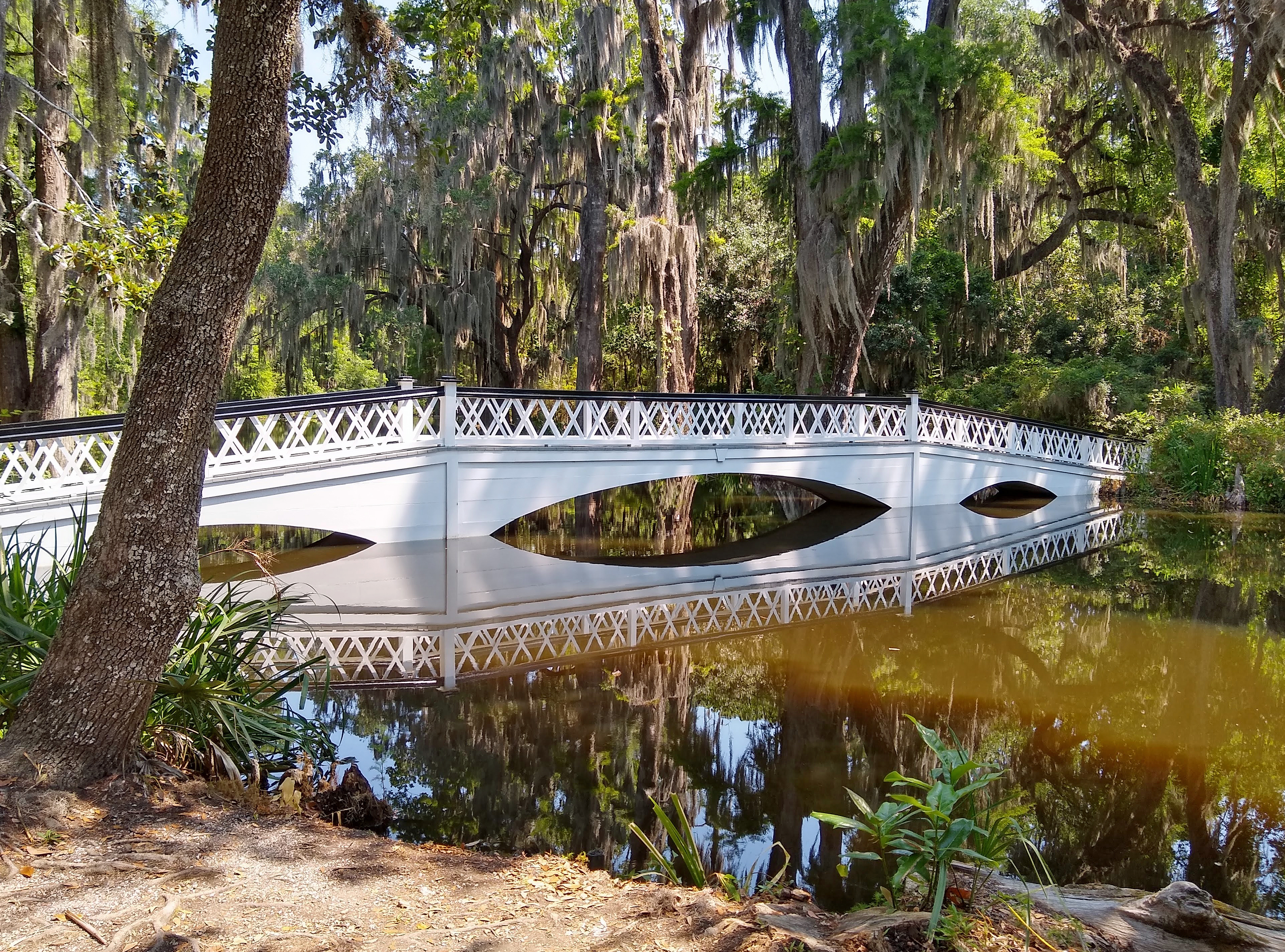
The Long Bridge, Magnolia Plantation and Gardens, 2021

Old rice fields were no longer feasible to maintain and were shaped into an area served by intricate walking paths among the flowering plants. Adam Bennett continued as his master gardener. In 1872 the gardens were opened to the public for the first time, and a small entrance fee was charged. Railroads and steamers from Charleston brought visitors to the grounds. The publicity that Magnolia received in glowing articles in national publications such as Harper's Monthly Magazine increased exposure and attendance. Drayton's granddaughter, Marie Clinton Hastie, wrote years later than opening Magnolia to the public provided funds for Drayton's ministry to his African American parishioners. Reverend Drayton was not paid for his ministry after the war, except for $50 the vestry gave him in 1880.

The scope of Magnolia's diversity of azaleas and camellias cannot be understated. Drayton's garden journal listed 229 named varieties of azaleas at Magnolia in 1879. Many of these are now extinct. Ten years later there were almost 300 varieties of camellias. Magnolia now has the largest collection of camellias in the United States.

== Rebuilds His Ministry: To the Freedmen ==
Not only did John Grimké Drayton not have access to his home at Magnolia, but he was also barred from using his parish church. Union forces appropriated the church, one of the only buildings left standing in the area, as a public facility, a polling place. Reverend Drayton's white congregation was, he said, "annihilated".

All over South Carolina, freed men and women shunned their prewar white churches, in an "exodus of biblical proportions". Episcopal priests in the lowcountry who had had a thriving ministry among the enslaved now discovered that freedmen had no interest in them.

With no ministry to return to and his parish church off limits, Drayton could have abandoned both his black and white parishioners. But he did just the opposite. The only documented instance in South Carolina where freedmen willingly reunited with their prewar, white pastor was John Grimké Drayton in St. Andrew's Parish. Reverend Drayton was walking through the parish one Sunday in May, 1867 when he met a group of freedmen who asked him to restart worship services. "If Drayton had been a typical slave owner," a current history writes, "or had shown the slightest cruelty to his slaves, these freed people would have avoided him like the plague instead of seeking him out".

This ministry was not short-lived or one of expediency until his parish church could be recovered. Drayton ministered to the freedmen in the parish for twenty-two years (1867–89). He reopened each chapel and began holding services there on Sundays. Drayton was now in his sixties and living with tuberculosis, but he still walked sixteen to eighteen miles from Charleston to the chapels "eating my dinner from my pocket".

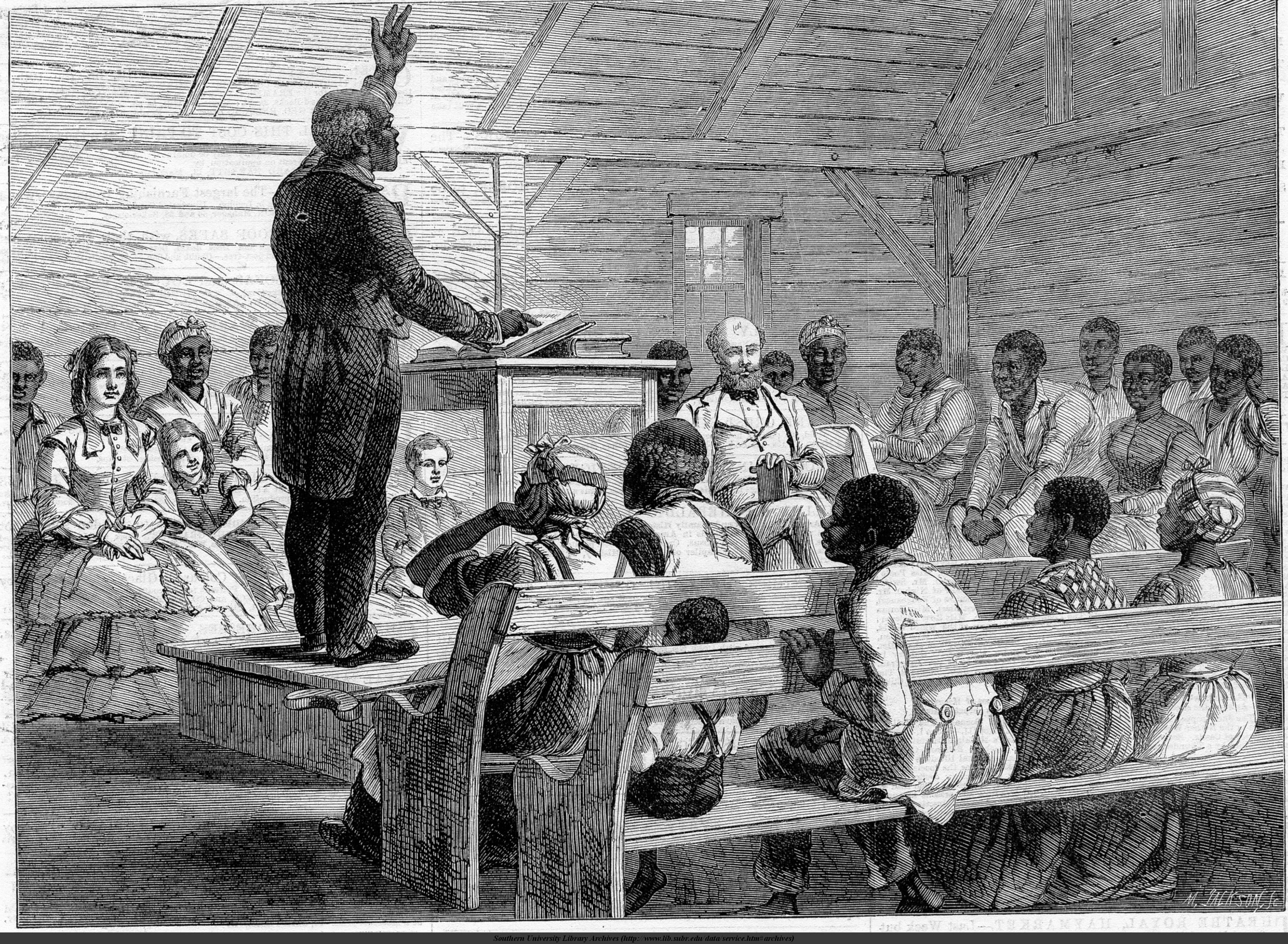
Plantation slave chapel worship in South Carolina, 1863

As strong as his ministry was among African American parishioners before the Civil War, now it was even stronger. Drayton openly praised those who returned to him to anyone who would listen. In 1869 Drayton preached to "overflowing congregations" at all three chapels. In 1874 Drayton wrote that "the devotion of my people to our Church continues firm and unabated. They are with rare exceptions, very poor; yet they are doing what they can to aid in restoring our places of worship, and in sending the Gospel to those at home and abroad. May our Church never neglect to foster those who, amid so many, so peculiar, so strong temptations to leave her have yet remained steadfast." Writing to a friend in 1881, he said, "How I wish I had you here for 2 or 3 Sundays. You would enjoy it."

From 1879 to 1883 there were an annual average of 161 black communicants at Magwood's and Magnolia chapels (Barker's had burned down) compared to only 19 whites, a margin of more than eight-to-one. Drayton's parishioners accounted for one-fourth of all black communicants in the entire Episcopal Diocese of South Carolina.

== Rebuilds His Ministry: At the Churches ==
Reverend Drayton reopened the dormant St. James Goose Creek Parish Church, another old colonial church not far from St. Andrew's, on January 2, 1876. Less than three months later, on Sunday, March 26, Drayton reopened St. Andrew's for worship for the first time in eleven years. The service was promoted in the Charleston News and Courier. Steamers ferried people from Charleston, where they disembarked at Bees Ferry just north of the church and walked through the old graveyard to the church. The money for repairing and reopening the church likely came from landowners selling part of their property to phosphate miners, as Drayton himself had done, which provided these property-rich but cash-poor people a financial lifeline. Ten years later the Great Earthquake "wrecked the Parish church ... The Chapels were also to some extent injured, and my own house [at Magnolia] was rendered uninhabitable," recounted Reverend Drayton. Reverend continued to spend summers at Flat Rock, where he continued his ministry at St. John in the Wilderness.

== The End ==
During the 1880s Drayton lived for a time with the Hasties – his daughter Julia, son-in-law William, and their children at Linwood in Summerville. By this time he was sick much of the time. His wife Julia died on May 23, 1887, and was buried in the graveyard at St. John in the Wilderness, Flat Rock. With Drayton's illness incapacitating him, care of the black congregation was turned over to another priest and deacon. In 1890 his condition worsened, and on April 2, 1891, John Grimké Drayton died at Linwood. He was one month shy of his seventy-fifth birthday. He was buried next to Julia in Flat Rock.

== Legacy ==
On Drayton's death, the Charleston News and Courier asked: "His soft voice and pleasing countenance will be sadly missed from his accustomed walks, and how can so rare an influence be replaced?" Bishop William B. W. Howe said of him, "Of late he was obliged by failing health to give up the work in St. Andrew's, but to the last he retained his interest in the work among the colored people; and the Diocese had no more effective preacher among them than Mr. Drayton."

In the 1890s the African American congregation worshiping at Magwood's Chapel that Reverend Drayton ministered to for so many years became its own church, called St. Andrew's, Charleston County. The same church today is known as St. Andrew's Mission Church.

In 1900 the Baedeker Guide for America listed only three sights worthy of two stars: Niagara Falls, the Grand Canyon, and Magnolia Gardens.

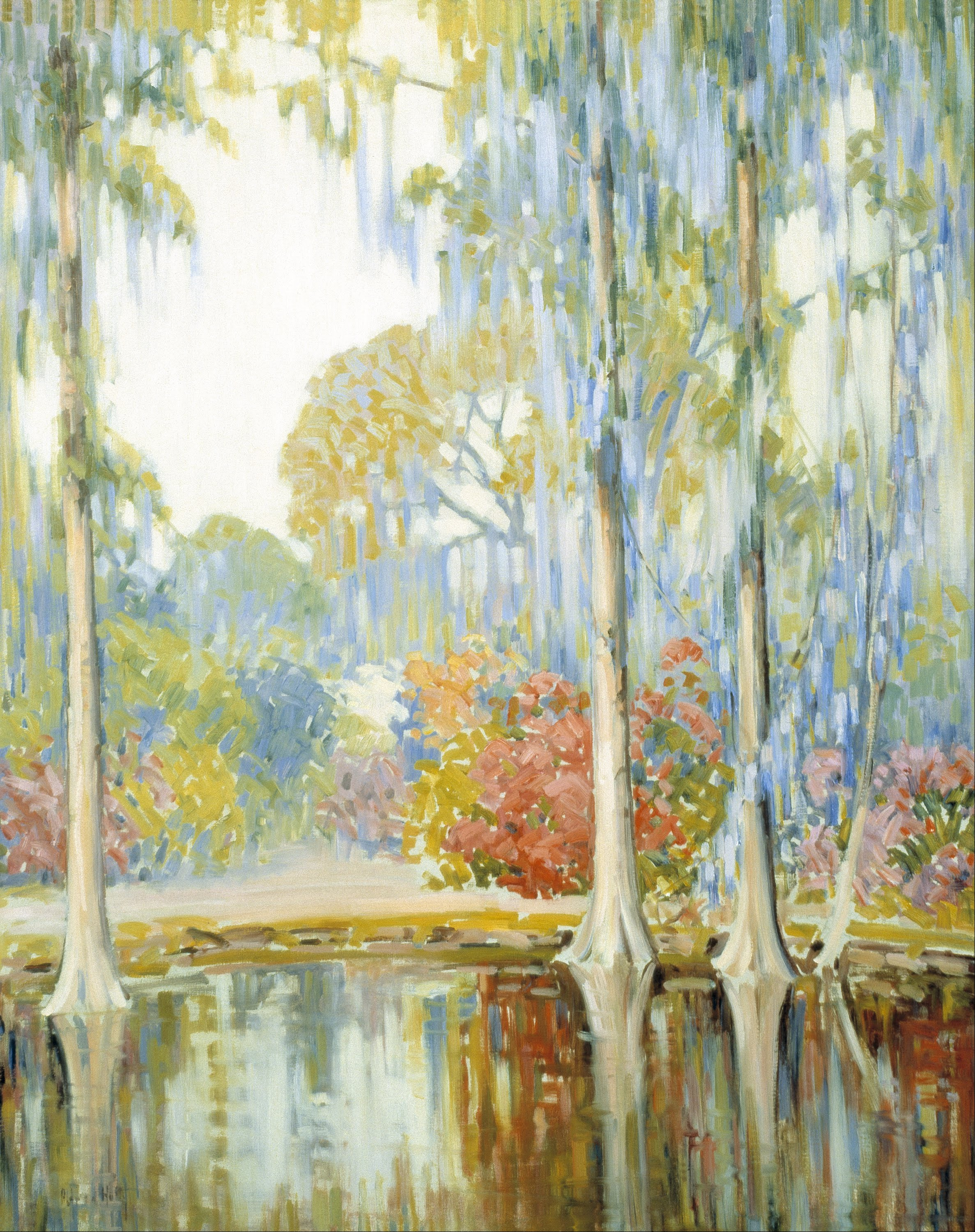
Magnolia Gardens by Alfred Hutty, 1920

In 1927 the Charleston News and Courier related that "in the wonderful Kew Gardens of London, England, there is a notice that tells all who walk [toward their collection of azaleas] that azaleas in their highest glory are to be found in Magnolia, near Charleston, South Carolina."

After Reverend Drayton died, he was not replaced at St. Andrew's, and the church sat dormant for the next fifty-seven years. It was reopened on Easter Day 1948. Two years later a marble memorial tablet commemorating the life and rectorship of the Rev. John Grimké Drayton was installed on the south wall of the nave and consecrated by Bishop Thomas N. Carruthers.

In 1957, sixty-six years after Drayton's death, Bishop Albert Sidney Thomas, writing in his history of the diocese, said, "he not only planted seed in the earth to form what has been called the most beautiful garden in the world (Magnolia) but he planted many a seed of the Word which we doubt not will flower to all eternity."

In 2000 Historic Flat Rock, Inc. purchased "The Preserve" in the center of the village to prevent further commercial expansion. This tract was the last remaining part of the Ravenswood estate built by the Rev. John Grimké Drayton. The house had been demolished in the early 1960s.

In 2012 Easter Sunrise service, hosted by Old St. Andrew's and St. Andrew's Mission Church, was held at Magnolia Plantation and Gardens for the first time after being hosted by Drayton Hall for three years. The service has remained at Magnolia since, with more than five hundred worshipers attending each year along the banks of the Ashley River.

In 2012 Magnolia Plantation and Gardens and Old St. Andrew's honored Reverend Drayton with six events on the 160th anniversary of the start of Drayton's ministry at the church and the 120th year of his death the prior year.

On March 5, 2013, the South Carolina House of Representatives passed a resolution honoring the Reverend John Grimké Drayton "for his lasting legacy of faith, compassion, and beauty" and declared May 1, 2013, as "John Grimké Drayton Day" in South Carolina.

On May 1, 2016, St. Andrew's Parish Church celebrated the 200th anniversary of Reverend Drayton's birth with a month-long series of events. A lecture series on Drayton's horticultural and ministerial life was held on four successive Sundays at the church, followed by commemoration weekend featuring a traditional lowcountry supper under the oaks, with the Voorhees College Gospel Choir singing; remarks on "The Rev. Drayton's St. Andrew's Parish Church"; and a Festal Eucharist followed by a reception.

In 2018 Old St. Andrew's and St. Andrew's Mission published "In My Trials, Lord, Walk with Me": What an Antebellum Parish Register Reveals about Race and Reconciliation. The book explores plantation slave ministry in St. Andrew's Parish before the Civil War, including that of John Grimké Drayton. "In his ministry to the enslaved before the Civil War and to the freedmen after it," the preface declares, "Drayton focused his life on improving the condition of people of color – every bit as much as the Grimké sisters did through their abolitionist writing and speeches." The book also features the relationship between two churches named St. Andrew's, one the predominantly white parish church and one the predominantly black mission church that was established in 1845 as a slave chapel, that builds on a difficult, shared history with an eye toward reconciliation. "This book contains a story that needs to be told," wrote the Rev. Marshall Huey, rector of Old St. Andrew's, "and a story that needs to be understood by all who seek true racial understanding and reconciliation in the Lowcountry of South Carolina." Said the Rev. Dr. Jimmy Gallant, vicar of St. Andrew's Mission: "Anyone who reads this book or reads about what we're doing will get excited about forgiveness and loving and kindness, how we're walking in the cause of Christ."

In 2022 Old St. Andrew's placed a new South Carolina highway marker near the entrance to the grounds that chronicles the long history of the church. John Grimké Drayton's influence as rector and minister to his African American parishioners are documented on this marker.

(Note: Images of John Grimké Drayton are intellectual property owned by Magnolia Plantation and Gardens.)

== See also ==
- Magnolia Plantation and Gardens (Charleston, South Carolina)
- Old St. Andrew's Parish Church
- St. John in the Wilderness (Flat Rock, North Carolina)
