= Audubon Swamp Garden =

Garden in South Carolina, United States

Coordinates: 32°52′29″N 80°5′21″W

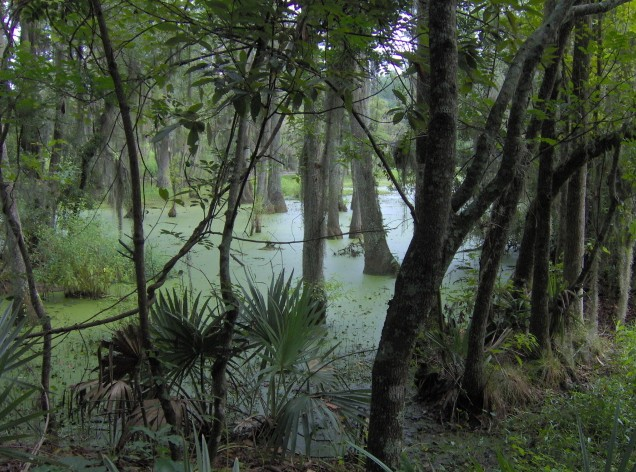
The Audubon Swamp Garden

Audubon Swamp Garden is a 60-acre (24 ha) cypress and tupelo swamp on the grounds of Magnolia Plantation near Charleston, South Carolina, United States. At one time, the swamp served as a reservoir for the plantation's rice cultivation. The swamp garden includes native flora and non-native, exotic plantings and is home to herons, ibis, turtles, otters, alligators, and other wildlife.

The swamp garden is named for ornithologist and artist John James Audubon, who visited the plantation before the Civil War and is said to have collected waterfowl specimens there as models for his paintings. Director Wes Craven made use of the site while filming the 1982 horror film Swamp Thing. The site also served as inspiration for Shrek's swamp.
