= Magnolia Plantation and Gardens (Charleston, South Carolina) =

Historic house in South Carolina, United States

- U.S. National Register of Historic Places
- U.S. Historic district
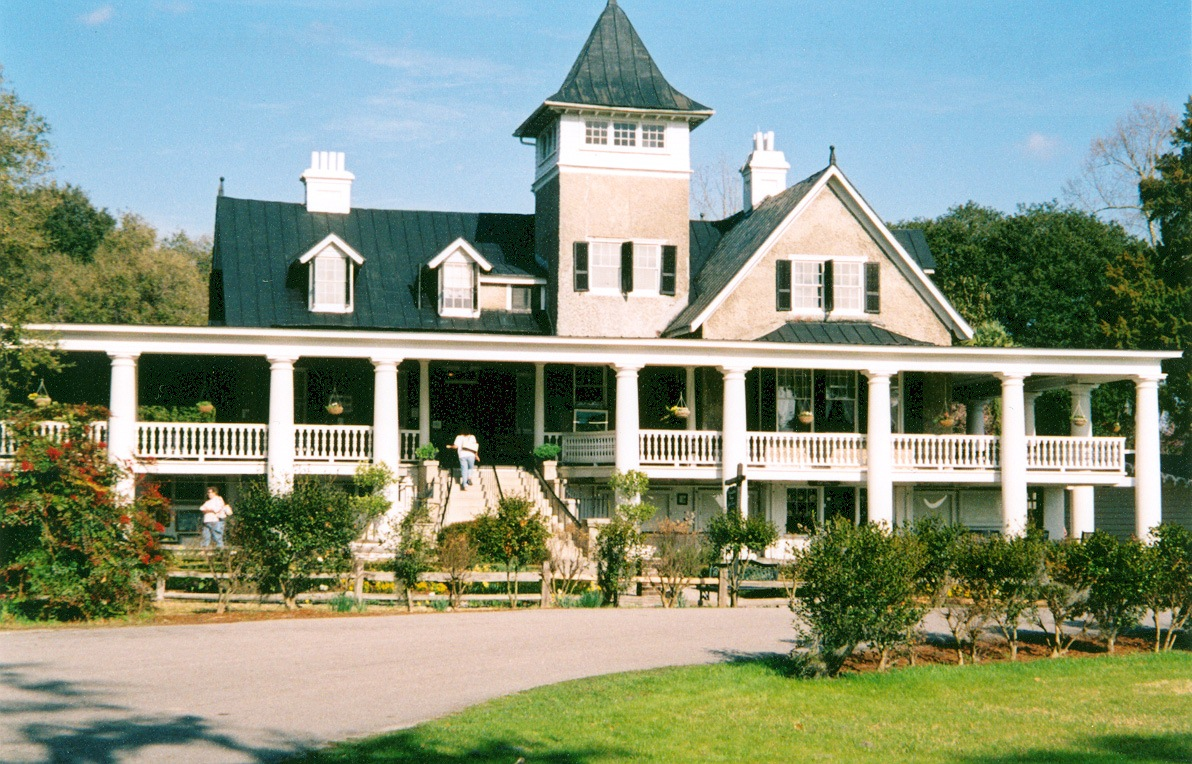
- Plantation home at Magnolia Plantation

- Location within South Carolina Location within the United States
- Nearest city: Charleston, South Carolina
- Coordinates: 32.87651°N 80.08351°W
- Area: 390 acres (160 ha)
- Built: 1850
- NRHP reference No.: 72001198
- Added to NRHP: December 11, 1972

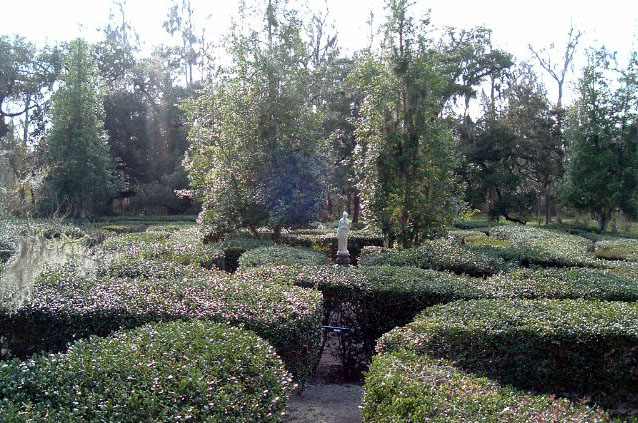
Horticulture maze on the plantation

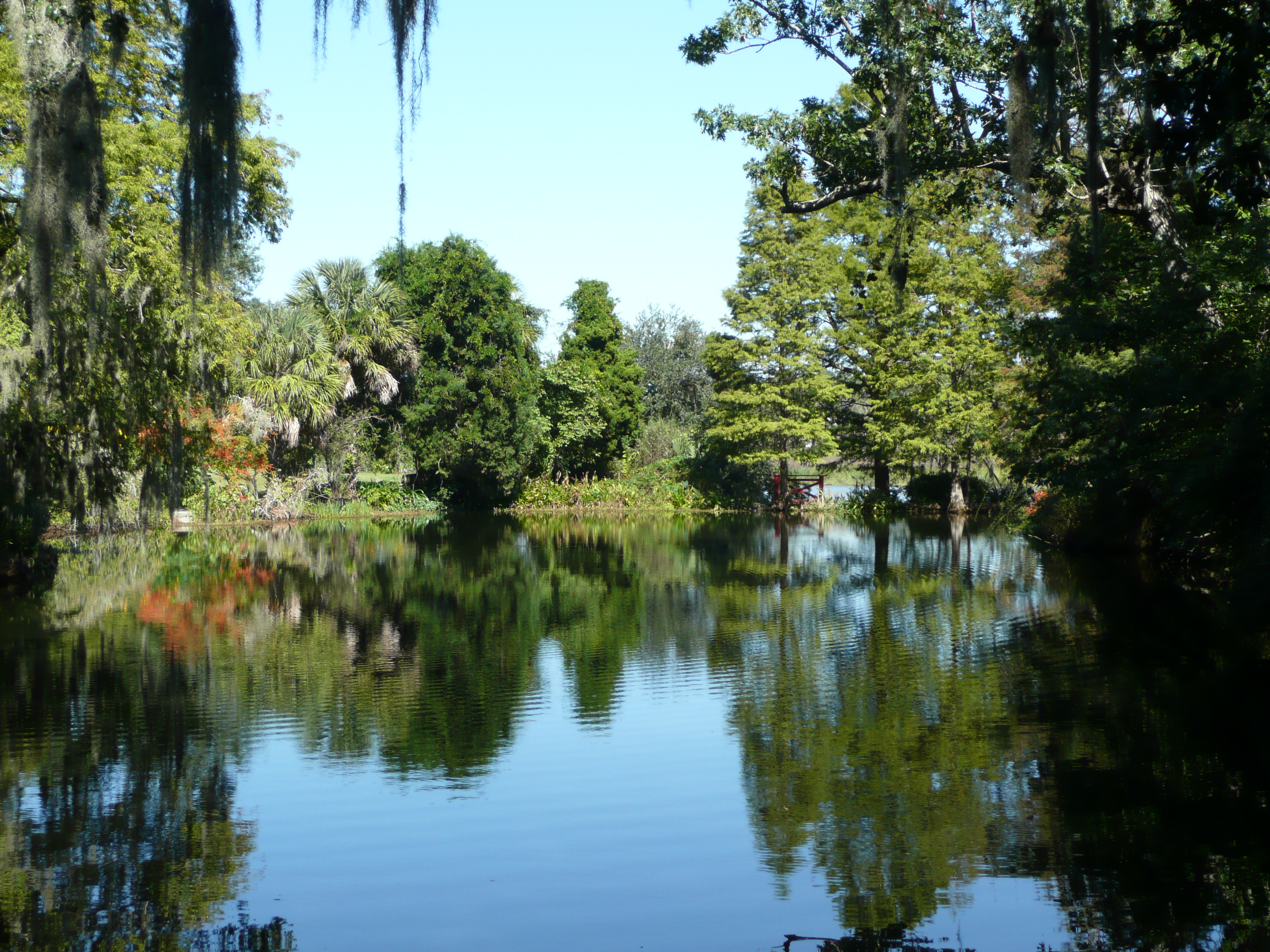
Lake on the plantation

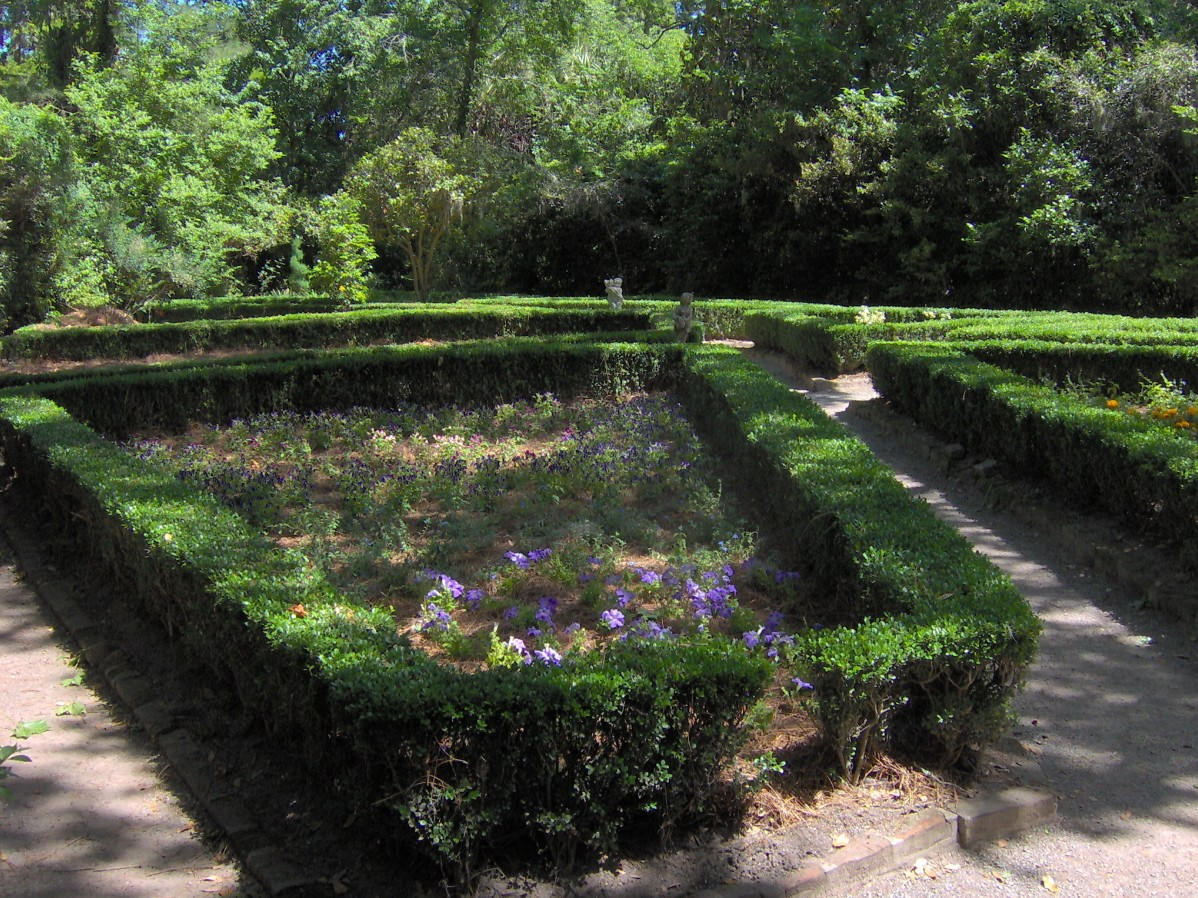
Flowerdale — first planted in 1680

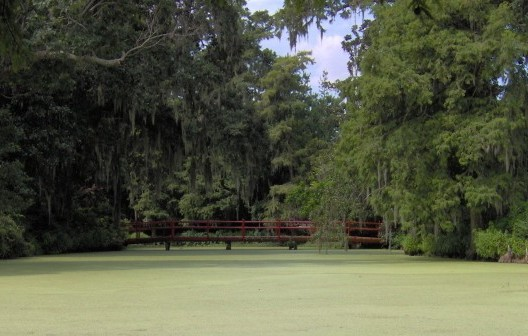
Red footbridge over green water

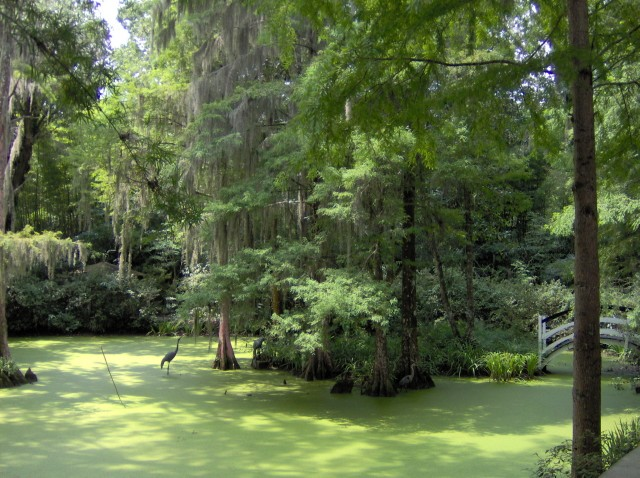
Pond with heron statues

Magnolia Plantation & Gardens (464 acres, 187.77 hectares) is a historic house with gardens located on the Ashley River at 3550 Ashley River Road West of Ashley, Charleston County, South Carolina. It is one of the oldest plantations in the South, and listed on the National Register of Historic Places. Magnolia is located near Charleston and directly across the Ashley River from North Charleston. The house and gardens are open daily; an admission fee is charged.

The plantation dates to 1679, when Thomas and Ann Drayton (née Anna Fox) built a house and small formal garden on the site. The plantation still remains under the control of the Drayton family after 15 generations. Some of the enslaved people who were forced to work at the house were brought by the Draytons from Barbados in the 1670s. The historic Drayton Hall was built in 1738 by enslaved laborers for John Drayton, grandfather of judge John Drayton II, on an adjoining property.

Magnolia was originally a rice plantation, with extensive earthworks of dams and dikes built in fields along the river for irrigating land for rice cultivation. African enslaved people from rice-growing regions created the works. As time went on, these enslaved people developed a creolized Gullah language and vibrant culture, strongly influenced by their West African cultures. They have retained many combined cultural elements from West Africa to this day in what is known as the Gullah Heritage Corridor of the Lowcountry and Sea Islands of the Carolinas and Georgia.

== History ==
Magnolia became known for its gardens after the Reverend John Grimké Drayton inherited the property in the 1840s and developed them. Through his mother, Grimké was the grandson of Thomas Drayton, who bequeathed the 1872-acre plantation to him on condition that he take the Drayton surname. Through his father, John was a nephew of sisters Sarah and Angelina Emily Grimké, who moved north and became noted abolitionists.

Drayton, an Episcopal minister, began to have the gardens reworked in an English style; according to legend, this was done to lure his bride south from her native Philadelphia. He was among the first to use Camellia japonica in an outdoor setting (1820s), and is said to have introduced the first azaleas to America. Under his supervision, the gardens of Magnolia on the Ashley became well known in the antebellum period for their azaleas and live oak trees. They were photographed by Mathew Brady, who would later become famous for his photographs of the American Civil War. Another visitor to Magnolia in this period was John James Audubon, for whom Magnolia's Audubon Swamp Garden is named.

The plantation house was burned during the Civil War, likely by Union troops, as was neighboring Runnymede Plantation to the northwest. In the aftermath of the Civil War and postwar economic disruption, John Grimké Drayton sold all but 390 acres to raise money. Today, 25 acres of the property are devoted to the gardens, 16 acres for the wide lawn surrounding the live oak allée, and 150 acres for a marsh and water fowl conservatory. Since 1941, about 199 acres have been used for a wholesale ornamental plant nursery to raise money for garden operations.

In the 20th century, notable visitors included George Gershwin, Henry Ford, Eleanor Roosevelt, Orson Welles and Reba McEntire. In the early 20th century, the impressionist painter William Posey Silva painted the garden a number of times, and several of his canvases are on display in the main house.

Magnolia Plantation has been credited for including information regarding slavery on their website.

== Description ==
Magnolia Plantation is operated as a house museum and tourist attraction. It has a reconstructed and restored plantation house, based on what was built after the Civil War. The oldest section was built prior to the Revolutionary War near Summerville. This structure was transported down the Ashley River after the Civil War and added to the house during its rebuilding. The wide verandah and huge columns were added more recently.

Enslaved Africans and African Americans worked in large gangs and lived in large groups on such plantations as Magnolia and others in the Low Country and the Sea Islands, often with little interference by whites. They developed a Creole language, now known as Gullah, that was based on West African languages and incorporated some English, as well as a culture that drew from these various cultures. This is considered a unique culture among the various African-American groups, distinguished by a specific cuisine, which features rice and seafood, and crafts such as baskets made of sea grass.

Of the five cabins on site, four were built in slavery times and one about 1900. During the Reconstruction period and later, freedmen lived in the former slave cabins. In order to represent the range of enslaved and free black workers' lives, these cabins have been restored to differing periods: one for 1850 and others to decades after the Civil War into the 20th century. The interpretive program reflects African-American history at the plantation, From Slavery to Freedom. Archeological work is revealing more about the lives of both slaves and free black workers, who were skilled gardeners and craftsmen.

Other elements of the plantation emphasize the natural setting: a nature train, a marsh boat tour, and a wildlife area. The Wildlife Center and the gardens feature a kind of cultivated nature. Many of today's attractions were built starting in 1975 during the garden's renewal.

Major garden features include numerous azalea plantings, as well as:

- Barbados Tropical Garden - indoor tropical garden.
- Biblical Garden - plants mentioned in the Bible, with Old Testament and New Testament areas
- Camellia Collection - First Camellia japonica plantings date from the 1820s, with current plantings containing nearly 900 varieties. Nearly 150 were bred in the gardens' nursery.
- Cattail Wildlife Refuge - approximately 500 acres (2 km^{2}), with tower for bird observation.

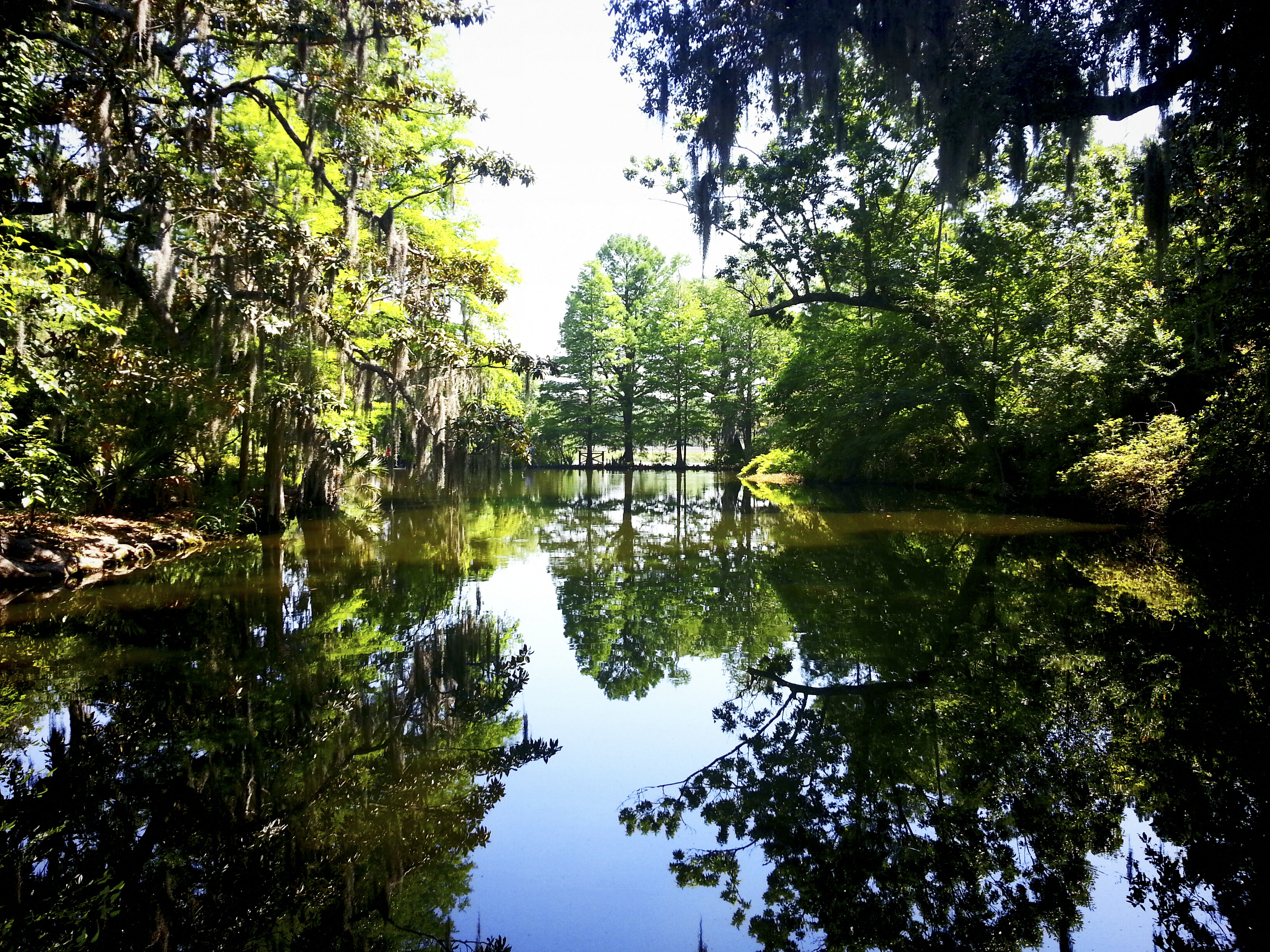
Magnolia Plantation's noted "mirroring" Cypress Lake

- Cypress Lake - Bald cypress trees, up to 100 years old, along riverbanks and wetlands.
- Flowerdale (50 acres) - Oldest sections established in 1680. Formal plantings of annuals set within triangular beds enclosed by boxwood hedges. Two large camellias date from the 1840s.
- Long Bridge - Built in the 1840s, one of seven bridges on the grounds.
- Maze - replica of England's famous Hampton Court maze, but planted with some 500 Camellia sasanqua interspersed with Burford holly. Nearly 14 miles (23 km) of pathways.
- Wildlife Center: Domesticated animals typical to Southern plantations such as Muscovy Ducks and Pygmy Goats. Many injured or orphaned native animals like Raccoons, a Bobcat, and Southern Flying Squirrels. As well as exotic birds like Peafowl.
- Audubon Swamp Garden - emphasizing indigenous plants and rich ecosystem.

== See also ==
- John Grimké Drayton
- McLeod Plantation
- Middleton Place
- List of botanical gardens in the United States
- Old St. Andrew's Parish Church
- St. Andrew's Mission Church (Charleston, South Carolina)
