= Ashley Landing =

Shopping mall in South Carolina, USA

Coordinates: 32°48′50″N 79°59′45″W

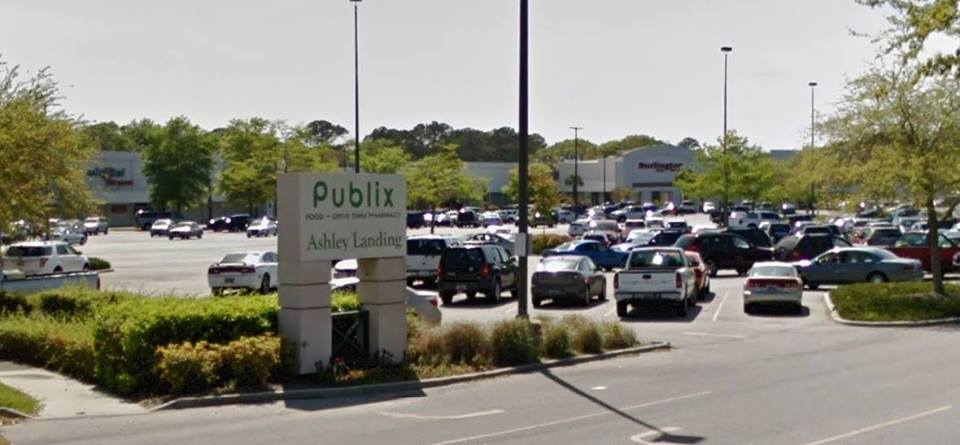
- Location: Charleston, South Carolina, United States
- Address: 1401 Sam Rittenberg Boulevard
- Opened: 1970 as Ashley Plaza and later Ashley Plaza Mall in 1972 (Renamed Ashley Landing, 1989)
- Developer: Gate City Realty Co.
- Owner: Ashley Landing (Edens), LLC
- Architect: Bartlett Hartley & Mulkey
- Num. of stores: 23
- Num. of anchor tenants: 5
- Floors: 1
- Website: www.ashleylanding.com

Ashley Landing (originally opened as Ashley Plaza and later known as Ashley Plaza Mall) is a shopping center in Charleston, South Carolina, United States. It was the first indoor shopping mall in the West Ashley area of Charleston when the complex was fully completed in 1972. The center, located at 1401 Sam Rittenberg Boulevard (S.C. Highway 7) at the fork of Old Towne Road (S.C. Highway 171) was developed by Gate City Realty Company of Fort Lauderdale, Florida. Ground was broken for the complex in 1962 with Ashley Plaza opening on April 16, 1964. At its opening the shopping center consisted of J.M. Fields Department Stores joined to a Pantry Pride supermarket, built at a cost of $1.75 million and owned by Sumar Corporation of South Carolina. The locally owned Condon's Department Store, constructed adjacent to Pantry Pride as a freestanding building, became the third tenant when it opened in 1970. The center, originally known as "Ashley Plaza" was noted for its large red and white neon pylon "Ashley Plaza" sign in the center of the parking lot that remained until 1989 when it was destroyed by Hurricane Hugo.

== Expansion and mall addition ==
In April 1972 an indoor shopping mall that was created by adding on to the shopping plaza and enclosing the area between Pantry Pride and Condon's Department Store opened. The mall featured a number of local retailers as well as nationally known retailers and specialty shops and a dual screen General Cinemas (which was later expanded to three screens). A third department store, the locally owned Edward's was also added at this time. With the completion of the enclosed mall came a new name, Ashley Plaza Mall.

== Turbulent 1970s and 1980s ==
The mall thrived for many years during the 1970s, but was dealt several blows beginning in the late 1970s. Perhaps the most devastating was the bankruptcy and subsequent closure of J.M. Fields and Pantry Pride leaving one entire wing of the shopping complex vacant. Locally owned Edward's, on the opposite end of the mall, was purchased by the Kuhn's-Big K Corporation who renamed the store "Big K-Edwards." The changes were in name only as the merchandise mix was not altered with the sale. Big K was subsequently sold to Wal-Mart Stores, Inc. who closed the Big K-Edwards store as it was not large enough to operate as a Wal-Mart. This left another large vacancy on the other end of the shopping center.

The mall's owners worked diligently to secure replacement anchor tenants for the vacant buildings and were successful in leasing the vacant J.M. Fields building to the F.W. Woolworth Company which opened a Woolco Department Store in the building. The Pantry Pride store was leased to a local businessman who opened Jameson's Red & White Supermarket in the vacated space. The former Edward's store remained vacant for a number of years before finally being subdivided and leased to a mattress shop and an unfinished furniture store. While all appeared to be on the upswing for the newly invigorated mall, change was again in store and would deal another devastating blow to the mall.

== Woolco closure and Citadel Mall opening ==
The early 1980s brought a surprising announcement when the F.W. Woolworth Company announced that it was closing all Woolco stores in the United States in 1983. The 87,000-square-foot (8,100 m^{2}) big box store would again be left vacant which made a tremendous impact on traffic at the mall. Two years before Woolco closed, the new 100-store Citadel Mall opened less than three miles (5 km) away from Ashley Plaza Mall. Many of the major national retailers pulled out of Ashley Plaza Mall and opened new locations in the much larger, more modern Citadel Mall. The mall struggled to survive as occupancy rates fell significantly. The supermarket space that formerly housed Pantry Pride and later Jameson's Red & White was leased to another locally based supermarket retailer known as The Big W Food Warehouse and ultimately closed. This space would later temporarily become a locally operated fruit and vegetable retailer for a short time.

A large portion of the mall, including the space formerly occupied by Edward's, was closed in the late 1980s and vacant stores were combined and reconfigured for a Burlington Coat Factory store leaving only one small wing of the indoor mall operating with a handful of merchants.

== Hurricane Hugo ==
On September 22, 1989, the mall was dealt another tremendous blow with the arrival of Hurricane Hugo which caused severe roof and water damage to many of the stores and destroyed some of the exterior facades. It would be several months before the majority of the stores could be repaired and reopened. The exterior was given a fresh new look with synthetic stucco and paint and redesigned storefronts and the remaining interior mall wing was updated with lighter floors and decor. The mall was renamed Ashley Landing (complete with new signage) to honor its close proximity to the nearby Charles Towne Landing state historic site, and "mall" was officially dropped from the name. The remaining indoor mall wing was closed within a short period of time and the individual store spaces combined and converted into space for another discount retailer, 50-Off Stores, which also ultimately closed, thus ending the mall's classification as a true indoor mall.

== Conversion to a strip shopping center ==
With the mall's two concourses now combined to make space for big box retailers, the shopping center returned to its original roots as a strip shopping center. The former Woolco space had been subdivided into two smaller spaces and a portion was leased to Brendle's Catalog Showroom and the remaining space to a regionally owned clothing store, United Clothing Company. The clothing store closed within a year of opening although Brendle's, which had opened in the late 1980s, was rebuilt after Hurricane Hugo and reopened a newly designed store. The store remained at Ashley Landing until the company's subsequent bankruptcy in the mid-1990s. Discount retailer Big Lots leased the former grocery store space and remains there today. Upon Brendle's departure, the subdivided space that originally housed J.M. Fields and later Woolco was once again converted back into a single 87,000-square-foot (8,100 m^{2}) building and leased in 1997 to Carolina Pottery, a large regionally based importer of pottery, housewares and china.

Carolina Pottery remained at the center until 2001 when they suddenly broke their lease and departed resulting in a lawsuit filed by the center's owner, Ashley Plaza Mall Associates. The Carolina Pottery space was once again subdivided - this time into 3 separate buildings, with portions being leased to Dollar Tree and Pivotal Fitness, with a remaining 24,500-square-foot (2,280 m^{2}) space leased to NAPA Auto Parts.

Another dispute emerged between original anchor, Condon's Department Stores, and Ashley Plaza Mall Associates over the center's construction of a new Publix Super Market addition that left large piles of dirt in the parking area, which Condon's claimed blocked customer access to their store and created a dangerous situation for customers. The dispute ultimately led to the Condon's store closing after their lease was not renewed.

== Ashley Landing today ==
The center still suffered from an identity crisis in 2000 when the City of Charleston, in conjunction with the adjoining residential neighborhoods conducted a design charrette for the Ashley Landing site and recommended a number of improvements to the shopping center's owners for revitalization. The city proposed an extensive overhaul of the property in an attempt to make it a neighborhood gathering place, complete with redesigned buildings that would include retail, offices and residences. Design elements such as new store facades, extensive landscaping and brick pedestrian crosswalks were proposed. Representatives from The Cordish Company indicated that they were interested in the city's plans but could not commit to any revitalization efforts due to existing store leases.

It was announced on February 5, 2014, that Faison Enterprises Inc. of Charlotte, NC acquired Ashley Landing for $19.2 million. Faison is currently undertaking an extensive renovation, revitalization and expansion of the property and adding new tenants that are better suited to the area. While initial and substantial improvements are underway, Faison has indicated that this is a long-term redevelopment project. In conjunction with the redevelopment plans, Faison also acquired the adjacent vacant former Piggly Wiggly building and adjoining property located on Sumar Street, which was later sold to the City of Charleston. Faison Enterprises spun off a majority of its retail holdings in 2017, including Ashley Landing, to a newly formed sister company, Wintergreen Capital.

In 2024, plans for a $345 million redevelopment of the Ashley Landing area were announced. The project, spearheaded by developer Edens, combines city-owned land and the existing shopping center. It includes over 6 acres of green space, 325 apartments, 100 townhomes, and 230,000 square feet of retail and restaurant space. The redevelopment aims to revitalize West Ashley and is projected to be completed by 2028, with phased construction starting in 2025.
