= MUSC Health University Medical Center =

Geography
- Location: 171 Ashley Ave, Charleston, SC, USA
- Coordinates: 32°47′10″N 79°56′52″W

Organisation
- Care system: Public
- Type: Teaching
- Affiliated university: Medical University of South Carolina
- Network: MUSC Health

Services
- Standards: ANCC Magnet Designation
- Emergency department: Level I Adult Trauma Center / Level I Pediatric Trauma Center
- Beds: 865 Licensed Beds

History
- Former names: Medical University Hospital (1955), MUSC Medical Center (1985)
- Constructed: 1951
- Opened: 1955

Links
- Website: muschealth.org/locations/university-medical-center
- Other links: muschealth.org

MUSC Health University Medical Center is a university hospital associated with the Medical University of South Carolina, based in Charleston, South Carolina with additional sites located throughout the state.

Founded in 1824 in Charleston, MUSC and MUSC Health make up the state’s only comprehensive academic health system. As the health care system of MUSC, patient care is provided at 16 hospitals (includes owned and affiliated), with approximately 2,700 beds and four additional hospital locations in development; more than 350 telehealth sites and connectivity to patients’ homes; and nearly 750 care locations situated in all regions of South Carolina. In 2023, for the ninth consecutive year, U.S. News & World Report named MUSC Health University Medical Center in Charleston the No. 1 hospital in South Carolina.

MUSC has a total enterprise annual operating budget of $5.9 billion. The nearly 26,000 MUSC workers include faculty, physicians, specialty providers, scientists, students, affiliates and care team members who deliver education, research and patient care.

The MUSC Health Transplant Center is one of the top ten kidney transplantation centers in the nation. The MUSC Health Transplant Center is supported by the only HLA Laboratory in South Carolina. MUSC Health University Medical Center is the regional referral center for the Lowcountry of South Carolina.

Plans were announced in 2017 for a new 126,000-square-foot outpatient facility to be constructed in the former JCPenney building at Citadel Mall in West Ashley. The two-story complex will be completely renovated with the lower level used for surgery and procedures, radiology and therapy; a second floor will hold physician offices and examination rooms.

The Phase I Replacement Hospital with 156 beds was completed in 2008 and a new Bee Street Parking Garage opened for employee and rehab patient parking. The Pediatric Trauma Center/Emergency Room was re-built, opening in first quarter 2009. The long-term plan includes 4 more phases of construction which will provide an updated trauma center, adult rooms and expanded Children's Hospital.

== Allegations of racism ==
In the summer of 1969, Coretta Scott King, the widowed wife of the civil rights hero Dr Martin Luther King Jr., led a strike of hundreds of black women nurses at MUSC Health. Although the strike failed to win the workers their desired collective bargaining rights, it did bring their concerns of unequal treatment to the attention of MUSC Health management.

In 2018 many black women working at MUSC Health argue little has changed and at least two workers sued for redress, claiming they have been the victims of systemic racism. Workers allege that whites are given favoritism in promotions and are less often fired, that the grievance panel discriminates against blacks, and that there is a long-standing problem with racist language and behavior involving managers. The hospital vehemently denies these allegations.

== Transgender healthcare ==
In late 2022, following pressure from the South Carolina Freedom Caucus, MUSC Health ended its pediatric/adolescent transgender hormonal care, noting that MUSC Health did not offer gender-altering surgery.
