= Charles Towne Square =

- Location: North Charleston, South Carolina, United States
- Coordinates: 32°52′38″N 80°0′41″W
- Address: 2401 Mall Drive
- Opened: March 25, 1976; 50 years ago
- Closed: 1997
- Developer: Melvin Simon & Associates
- Owner: WP Glimcher
- Num. of stores: 75
- Num. of anchor tenants: 3
- Floor area: 467,811 sq ft (43,461.1 m^{2})
- Floors: 1

Charles Towne Square was an indoor shopping mall located in North Charleston, South Carolina opened in 1976 by developer Melvin Simon & Associates. It was most noted for its large "town square" style clock and children's train ride during Christmas time. The mall's tenants included original anchors Montgomery Ward, JCPenney and Edward's, a local department store which would later be sold to Kuhn's-Big K and renamed "Big K-Edwards." Big K-Edwards closed and Wilson's Catalog Showrooms moved into the space. The Wilson's chain was later sold to Service Merchandise. In addition to the mall's anchors, the shopping complex also featured approximately 75 specialty stores and a General Cinemas. The mall opened with great fanfare in 1976 with a Charlestonian bi-centennial theme. Television celebrity Ed McMahon led the festivities, complete with American Revolutionary War-era costumes. Other special guests included World War II soldier Mark Clark, football player Rosey Grier, and Claude Akins.

== The mall's demise ==
Changing economic conditions spurred by the closure of the nearby Charleston Naval Base prompted anchor JCPenney to relocate to the larger Northwoods Mall in the early 1990s followed by the exit of Service Merchandise. The mall never recovered from these moves and most specialty stores ultimately left the mall. Plans were announced in 1997 to raze the mall, with the exception of the still operating Montgomery Ward, and replace it with a number of big box retailers connected to the existing Montgomery Ward and surrounded by a few smaller shops. The mall was demolished and an 18-screen Regal Cinemas was added along with a Courtyard by Marriott hotel; however, plans for the big box retailers and other shops never materialized.

The subsequent bankruptcy of Montgomery Ward in 2000 also dealt the project a final blow. The store ultimately closed in 2001 and was later converted to office space, with Montgomery Ward's free-standing auto center converted to an art gallery that relocated from inside the mall and later would become a restaurant and daycare. The only remaining original tenant from its days as a mall, Piccadilly Cafeterias, which opened in 1976 with the mall and relocated to a newly constructed building on an outparcel at the mall after the mall was demolished, closed suddenly on July 22, 2012, and the building was sold to Cowboy Brazilian Steakhouse. The former mall site has been redeveloped as an office complex, with a Verizon Wireless call center operating in the former Ward's building and a new multi-story office tower near Piccadilly which houses the new City Hall for the City of North Charleston.

The main road where the mall was located is still is called Mall Drive, even though prior to the mall's construction it was known as Goodrich Road.

The mall's large "town square" style clock was donated to the City of North Charleston upon the mall's closing and placed in storage. It was recently refurbished and added to the food court of the nearby newly opened Tanger Outlet Center.

In April 2019, the 18-screen Regal Cinemas was proposed to be demolished for a 300 residential unit complex. As of February 2020, the demolition has wrapped up and the site of the cinema is being prepared for redevelopment.
