= Middleton High School =

Middleton is a name for several high schools in North America, including:

- Middleton High School (Florida) — Tampa, Florida
- Middleton High School (Idaho) — Middleton, Idaho
- Middleton High School (South Carolina) — Charleston, South Carolina
- Middleton High School (Tennessee) — Middleton, Tennessee
- Middleton High School (Middleton, Wisconsin) — Middleton, Wisconsin
- Middleton Transition School — Middleton, Idaho

== See also ==
- Middletown High School (disambiguation)
