= Big K =

Big K may refer to:

- Kuhn's-Big K, southeast American department store chain, sold out to Wal-Mart in 1981
- A larger store format of Kmart
- A store brand used by Kroger (and subsidiaries) for soft drinks
- Big K (magazine), a national UK computer magazine in the 1980s
- A nickname for the International Prototype of the Kilogram
