= History of Walmart =

Logo used since January 13, 2025

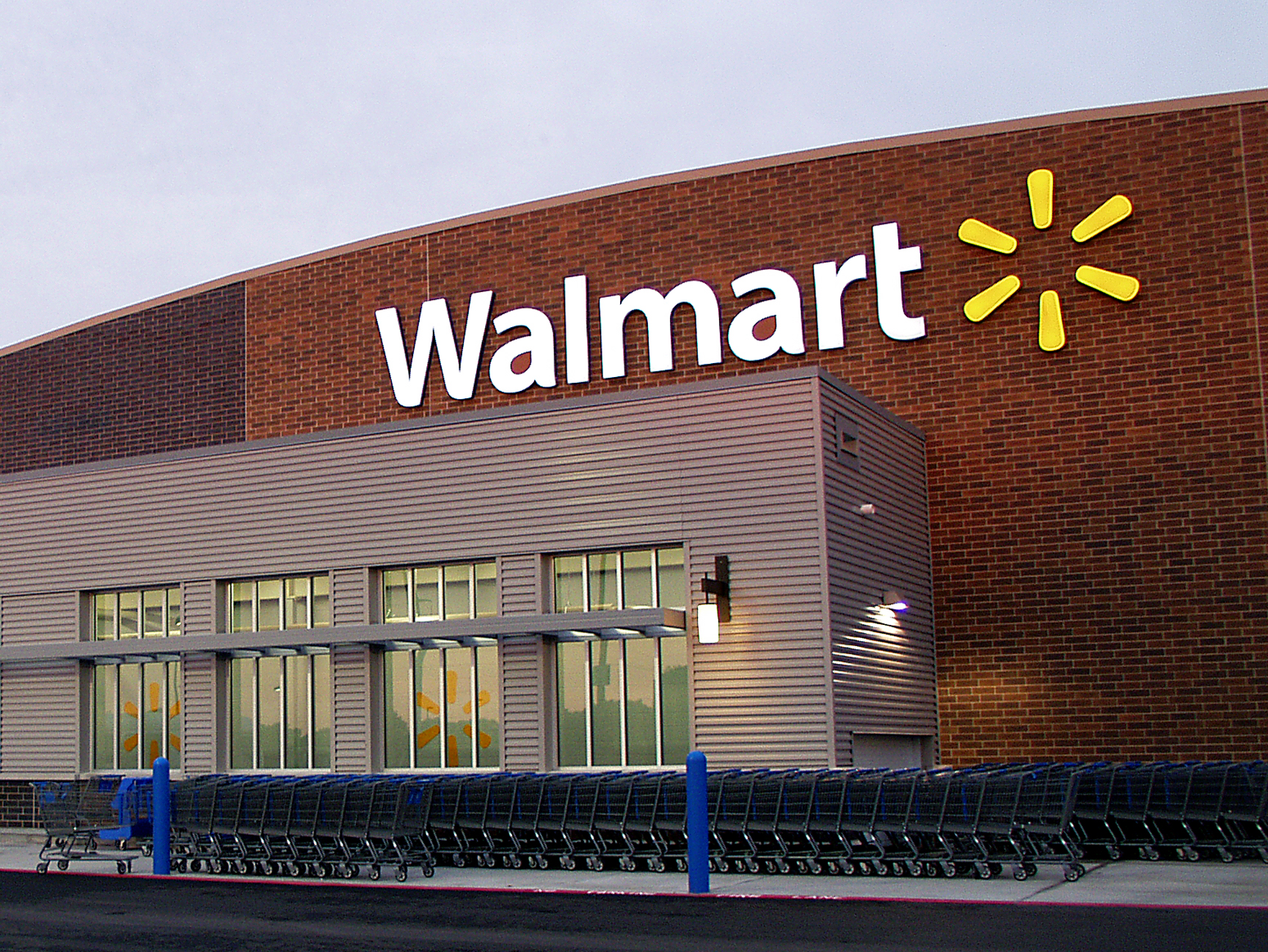
A Walmart Supercenter store in Bloomington, Minnesota

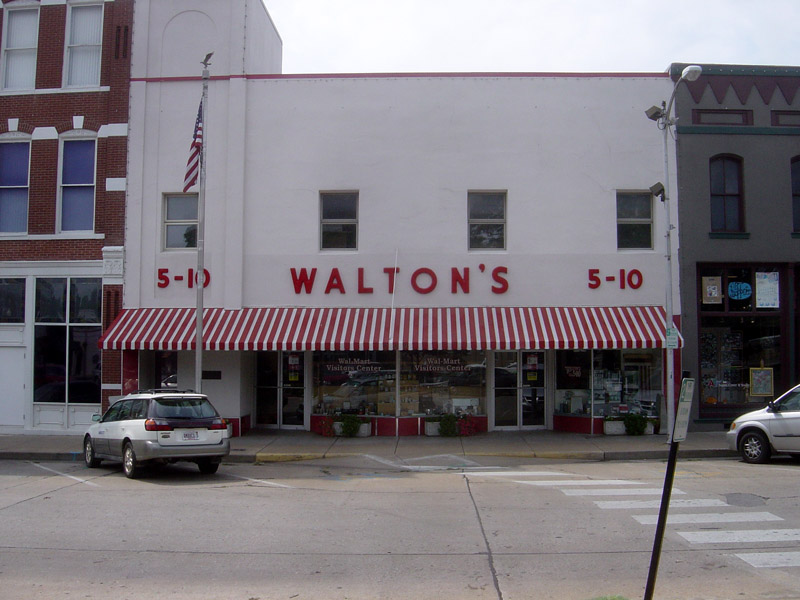
Sam Walton's original Walton's Five and Dime, now the Walmart Museum Visitor Center in Bentonville, Arkansas.

The history of Walmart, an American discount department store chain, began in 1950 when businessman Sam Walton purchased a store from Luther E. Harrison in Oklahoma City, Oklahoma, and opened Walton's 5 & 10. The Walmart chain proper was founded in 1962 with a single store in Rogers, Arkansas, expanding inside Oklahoma by 1968 and throughout the rest of the Southern United States by the 1980s, ultimately operating a store in every state of the United States, plus its first stores in Canada, by 1995. The expansion was largely fueled by new store construction, although the chains Mohr-Value and Kuhn's Big K were also acquired.

== 1960s and 1970s ==
Logo used from 1962 to 1964

At some point, Sam Walton made the decision to achieve higher sales volumes by keeping sales prices lower than his competitors by reducing his profit margin. Inspired by the successes of other discount department store chains, Walton opened the second store in Harrison, Arkansas, that year. Responsible for the purchase and maintenance of signage, Walton's assistant, Bob Bogle, came up with the name "Wal-Mart" for the new chain. By 1967, the company grew to 24 stores across the state of Arkansas, and had reached $12.6 million in sales, and by 1968, the company opened its first stores outside of Arkansas in Sikeston, Missouri, and Claremore, Oklahoma.

The company's first stock split occurred in May 1972 at a market price of $47 (~$274.00 in 2025). By this time, Walmart was operating in five states: Arkansas, Kansas, Louisiana, Missouri, and Oklahoma, and expanded into Tennessee in 1973 and Kentucky and Mississippi in 1974. As the company expanded into Texas in 1975, there were 125 stores with 7,500 associates, and total sales of $340.3 million (~$1.58 billion in 2025).

Logo used from 1964 to 1981

By 1977, Walmart expanded into Illinois and made its first corporate acquisition, assuming ownership and operation of 16 Mohr-Value stores, which operated in Missouri and Illinois. This was followed by the acquisition of the Hutcheson Shoe Company in 1978. In the same year, Walmart also branched out into several new specialty divisions, creating its first wholly-owned pharmacies, auto service centers, and jewelry departments.

== 1980s and 1990s ==
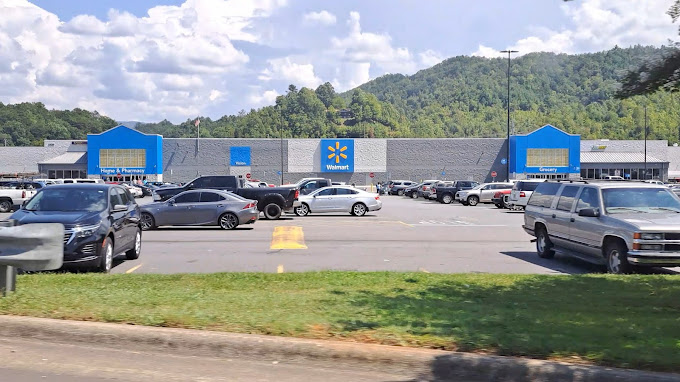
Walmart Store 515 in Murphy, NC, the first Walmart in North Carolina, opening on August 16, 1983. This store has a new exterior design that was introduced in 2021. Taken August 27, 2023.

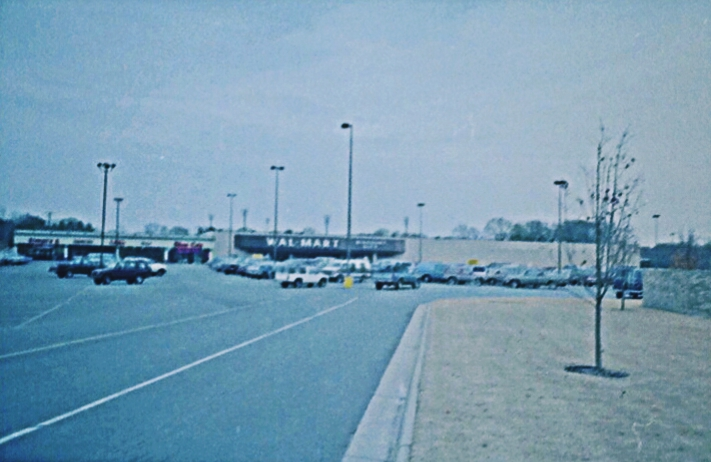
A Walmart store in the 1980s.

In 1981, Walmart expanded into the southeastern US market, opening stores in Alabama, Georgia and South Carolina, and acquiring 92 Kuhn's Big K stores. They expanded into Florida and Nebraska in 1982.

In April 1983, the company opened its first Sam's Club store, a membership-based discount warehouse club, in Midwest City, Oklahoma. They also expanded into Indiana, Iowa, New Mexico, and North Carolina and implemented "people greeters" in all of their stores. The first stores opened in Virginia in 1984.

In 1985, with 882 stores with sales of $8.4 billion and 104,000 associates, the company expanded into Wisconsin and Colorado, and the first stores opened in Minnesota in 1986.

By the company's 25th anniversary in 1987, there were offices to track inventory, sales, and send instant communication to their stores. Continuing their technological upgrades, they had equipped 90% of their stores with barcode readers by 1988, to further assist in keeping track of their large inventory.

In February 1988, company founder Sam Walton stepped down as chief executive officer, and David Glass was named to succeed him. Walton remained on as Chairman of the Corporate Board of Directors, and the company also restructured their senior management positions, elevating a cadre of executives to positions of greater responsibility.

Also in 1988, the first Wal-Mart Supercenter was opened in Washington, Missouri. The supercenter concept features everything contained in an average Walmart discount store, in addition to a tire and oil change shop, optical center, one-hour photo processing lab, portrait studio, and numerous alcove shops such as banks, cellular telephone stores, hair and nail salons, video rental stores, and fast-food outlets.

By 1988, Wal-Mart was the most profitable retailer in the United States, though it did not outsell K-Mart and Sears in terms of value of items purchased until late 1990 or early 1991.

By 1988, Walmart was operating in 27 states, having expanded into Arizona, Michigan, Ohio, West Virginia, and Wyoming. By 1990, they expanded into California (which marked Walmart officially becoming a fully nationwide retailer), Nevada, North Dakota, Pennsylvania, South Dakota, and Utah. The Walmart Visitor Center also opened this year on the site of Sam Walton's original store.

The 1990s saw an era of furious growth on an unprecedented scale and the incorporation of several new ideas and technology into the business.

In 1990, US sales had quadrupled to $32 billion over the previous five years and Walmart acquired The McLane Company, a food service distributor, which was later sold to Berkshire Hathaway in 2003.

In 1991, the company expanded into Connecticut, Delaware, Maine, Maryland, Massachusetts, New Jersey, New Hampshire, and New York. Walmart expanded worldwide this year, with the opening of their first store outside the United States in Mexico City. They also acquired Western Merchandisers, Inc. of Amarillo, Texas. 1991 also saw the launch of the Sam's American Choice brand of products "Made in America" initiative, to stimulate American suppliers to produce more products and lower the price.

Logo used from 1992 to 2007. This logo is still in use at many locations as hundreds of stores are being transitioned to the newest logo. This logo can still be found on some semi-truck trailers. The first version of this logo used a hyphen instead of a star.

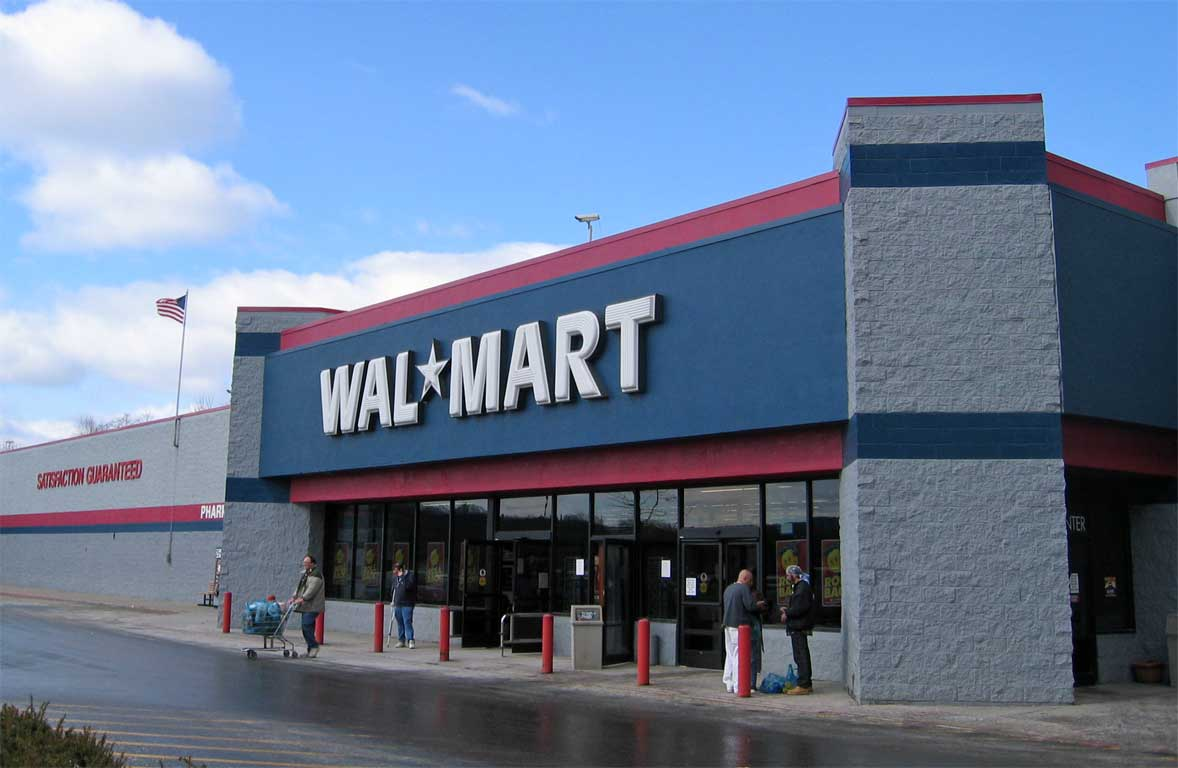
A Walmart store with its 1990s exterior, taken in 2004.

On March 17, 1992, US President George H. W. Bush presented Sam Walton with the Presidential Medal of Freedom. Walton died on April 5, 1992. His eldest son, S. Robson Walton, succeeded him as chairman of the corporate board of directors, on April 7, 1992. This year, Walmart had a presence in 45 states which by this time expanded into Idaho, Montana, and Oregon, as well as Puerto Rico.

In 1993, the Walmart International Division was formed with Bobby Martin as its president. The company also expanded into Alaska, Hawaii, Rhode Island, and Washington. Their stores also achieved the billion-dollar sales mark in one week in December 1993.

In 1994, the National Advertising Review Board challenged the Walmart slogan, "Always the low price. Always," contending that it implied that Walmart's prices were always the lowest and could mislead some shoppers. In response, Walmart adopted a new slogan, "Always low prices. Always."

Also in 1994, the Code Adam program was instituted in Walmart stores. That same year, Walmart acquired 91 PACE Membership Warehouse clubs from Kmart and 122 Woolco stores in Canada in 1994. In addition, it opened 3 value clubs in Hong Kong, and had 96 stores in Mexico.

By 1995, Walmart had 1,995 discount stores, 239 Supercenters, 433 SAM'S CLUBS and 276 international stores with sales at $93.6 billion (~$180 billion in 2025) (including US sales of $78 billion) and 675,000 associates. Walmart expanded into its final state (Vermont), and also expanded into South America, with three new units in Argentina and five in Brazil.

The company entered the Chinese market in 1996 through a joint-venture agreement. In 1996, a Walmart location in Dickson City, Pennsylvania closed after the building was damaged by a boulder, it was temporarily relocated to a former Jamesway store in Taylor, Pennsylvania in 1997. (in 1998 the location was replaced by a larger one in another part of Dickson City the following year). The site was purchased by the neighboring Wegmans and demolished in 2016. In 1997, Walmart replaced Woolworth on the Dow Jones Industrial Average. The company had its first $100 billion sales year, with sales totaling $118.1 billion. Also, this year, they acquired 21 Wertkauf stores in Germany, and introduced their OneSource nutrition centers.

In 1998, Walmart introduced the Neighborhood Market concept at three stores in Arkansas. Neighborhood Market stores are predominantly grocery stores, and are intended to attract customers with easier parking, less crowded aisles, and quicker checkout compared to an average grocery store. Internationally, Walmart enters South Korea by acquiring 4 stores operated by Korea Makro.

Also in 1998, Walmart launched its Wal-Mart Television Network, a vast, in-store advertising network showing commercials for products sold in the stores, concert clips and music videos for a recording artist's media, trailers for upcoming movie releases, and news.

The Asda chain in the United Kingdom became a subsidiary in 1999 and is the second-largest chain in the UK after Tesco.

== 21st century ==
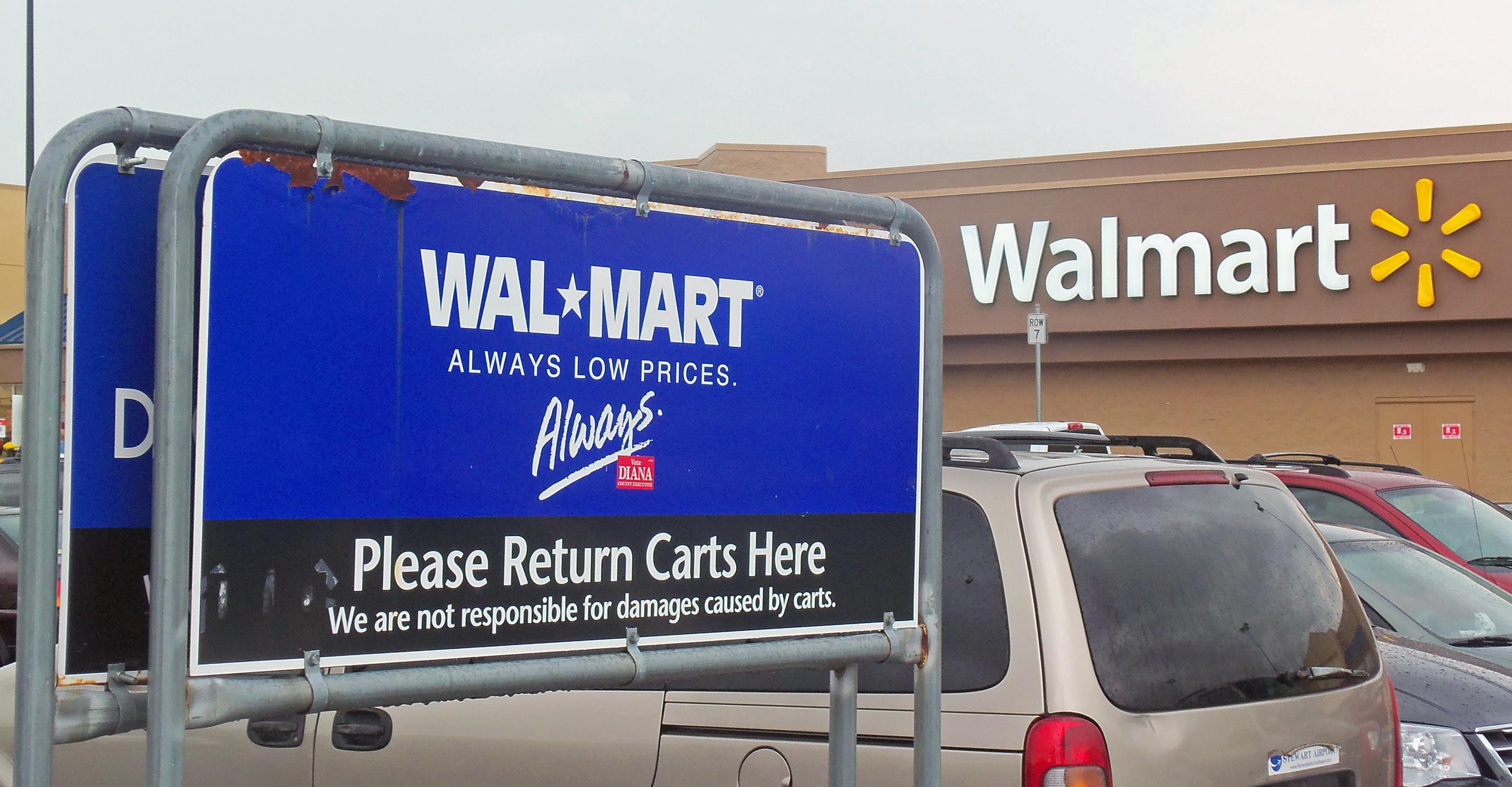
New and old Walmart logos outside store in Newburgh, New York, 2012 (Store #2104)

In 2000, Lee Scott was named president and CEO and US sales had doubled to $156 billion since 1995. That same year, Walmart was ranked fifth by Fortune magazine on its Global Most Admired All-Stars list and in 2003 and 2004, it was named as the most admired company in America.

In 2002, Walmart entered the Japanese market by acquiring a minor stake in Seiyu Group, who would become a wholly owned subsidiary of Walmart by 2008.

In 2005, had $312.4 billion (~$494 billion in 2025) in sales, more than 6,200 facilities around the world, including 3,800 stores in the United States and 3,800 international units, and more than 1.6 million associates employed worldwide. Their US presence had grown so rapidly that there were only small pockets of the country that remained further than 60 miles away from the nearest Walmart. Approximately 138 million customers visited Walmart stores each week all over the world. Their corporate philanthropy efforts also assisted the US hurricane relief efforts with $18 million in cash donations. Through a purchase of stock in Central American Retail Holding Company (CARHCO), Walmart also entered the countries of Guatemala, El Salvador, Honduras, Nicaragua, and Costa Rica.

On May 22, 2006, Walmart announced the sale of its 16 stores in South Korea to Shinsegae Co, which rebranded the stores to E-Mart. Then on July 26, 2006 Walmart announced a complete pull-out from the German market; all existing 85 stores were sold to the Metro Group, which rebranded most of them to Real (hypermarket).

The first iteration of the Walmart "spark" symbol used from September 12, 2007 to January 13, 2025. This symbol precedes the full new logo that launched nine months later.

The 1992 logo was also colored to a lighter shade of blue ion September 12, 2007 in preparation of Walmart's next logo.

On September 12, 2007, for the first time in 13 years, Walmart introduced new advertising with the slogan "Save money. Live better." instead of "Always Low Prices, Always." as well as a "spark", a symbol chosen to represent Walmart associates. It commissioned Global Insight for the ads and the report stated that as of 2006, the retailer saves American families $2,500 (~$3,993 in 2025) yearly (up 7.3% from $2,329, 2004). The new research found that the reduction in price levels due to Walmart resulted to savings for consumers of $287 billion in 2006, equivalent to $957 per person and $2,500 per household.

Logo used from 2008 to 2025

On June 30, 2008, Walmart unveiled the company's new logo, which stylized the name as "Walmart". In early 2009, Walmart entered Chile by acquiring Distribucion y Servicio D&S SA. In May 2009, Walmart entered into a 50/50 partnership with Bharti to gain access to the Indian market. Also in 2008, a Walmart that was built atop a landfill in Garfield Heights, OH closed due to toxic fumes.

On February 22, 2010, the company confirmed it was acquiring the video streaming company Vudu, Inc. for an estimated $100 million (~$144 million in 2025).

In June 2011, Walmart acquired 51% of Massmart Holdings. This acquisition gives the company access to the African countries of: South Africa, Botswana, Ghana, Lesotho, Malawi, Mauritius, Mozambique, Namibia, Nigeria, Swaziland, Tanzania, Uganda, and Zambia.

The Massmart acquisition received final governmental approval in early 2012. The single store Mauritius was closed in January 2012.

In June 2014, Walmart employees went on strike in several major cities in the United States.

The coronavirus (COVID-19) pandemic that occurred in early 2020 forced temporary measures such as store closures, limited store occupancy, large-scale employee dismissal, and the enforcement of social distancing protocols for Walmart and many other companies. Store hours were adjusted to allow cleaning and stocking. Limits on items for a short while were placed due to the rise of panic buying.

During the pandemic, Walmart changed some of its employee benefits. Employees were able to decide to stay home and take unpaid leave if they feel unable to work or uncomfortable coming to work. Additionally, Walmart employees who contract the virus would receive "up to two weeks of pay". After two weeks, hourly associates who are unable to return to work are eligible for up to 26 weeks in pay. Walmart paid pandemic bonuses of $428 million to its staff. People who did part-time or temporary work received a bonus of $150 while those who worked full-time received a bonus of $300. From 2020 to early 2022, Walmart customers were required to wear masks in all stores nationwide, including Sam's Club. By February 2022, the COVID-19 restrictions such as the mask requirements and employee benefits were lifted.

In the first quarter of 2020, Walmart consumers shopped less frequently (5.6% fewer transactions) and buying more when they did shop (16.5%).

In December 2020, Walmart launched a new service, Carrier Pickup, that allows the customers to schedule returns.

In January 2021, Walmart announced that the company is launching a fintech startup, with venture partner Ribbit Capital, to provide financial products for consumers and employees. As of 2024, Walmart is removing the self-checkout from some stores.

Walmart's current wordmark used since 2025

On January 13, 2025, Walmart unveiled a new logo for the first time in 17 years, which was designed by Jones Knowles Ritchie and Landor. This new branding involved the redesign of the iconic spark to made it more eligible for digital devices and separation of the new wordmark and redesigned spark, which now act as primary and secondary logos that can be used interchangeably. Additionally, Walmart unveiled a new custom font "Everyday Sans" implemented across the brand, which is based on Antique Olive Black, a font used from 1977 to 1992 and used in the logo from 1981 to 2008.

The second iteration of the Walmart "spark" symbol used since January 13, 2025

In November 2025, Walmart announced that longtime CEO Doug McMillon would retire in January. John Furner, who had served as president and CEO of Walmart U.S. since 2019, took over as chief executive on February 1. On December 10, 2025, Walmart Inc. announced it had officially transferred its common stock and bonds to Nasdaq.

=== New ventures ===
In late 2005, Walmart designed two experimental stores, one in McKinney, Texas and the other in Aurora, Colorado, which featured wind turbines, photovoltaic solar panels, biofuel-capable boilers, water-cooled refrigerators, and xeriscape gardens.

In March 2006, Walmart sought to appeal to a more affluent demographic, with the opening of a new supercenter in Plano, Texas, at the corner of Park Blvd. and the Dallas North Tollway which was intended to compete against stores that some viewed as more upscale and appealing. The new store features wooden floors, wider aisles, a sushi bar, a coffee/sandwich shop (with free Wi-Fi Internet access), a Subway, and higher-end items such as microbrew beer, expensive wines, and high-end electronics. The exterior sports the less-common hunter green background behind the Walmart letters instead of the trademark blue.

In response to the popularity of organic food supermarkets, such as Whole Foods and Wild Oats, Walmart announced plans in May 2006, to increase the amount of organic food available in its stores. They announced that both conventionally grown and organic versions of certain products would be available, and the price of organic versions would not be more than 10% over the price of conventionally grown products. Since Walmart is one of the nation's largest grocery retailers, there was some concern expressed that their push to lower prices would not be sustainable for inexpensive organic food.

=== Legal trouble ===
Over the last decade or so, Walmart has become involved in numerous lawsuits for a variety of reasons. The majority of the suits are class action lawsuits in which employees are suing for unpaid wages. They have also run into numerous discrimination cases in which employees are suing for being profiled out of money or out of jobs. For example, there were two separate cases, one in 2004 and one in 2005, in which black employees were suing two different Walmarts for denying them jobs based on race. These became so popular that the Reverend Jesse Jackson intervened and spoke during both of the proceedings. There are also many lawsuits in which women are suing Walmart for discriminating against them. In one article written in 2004, USA today mentioned 32 different lawsuits that involved women suing Walmart. But still, Walmart has prevailed. However, all of this has not had any effects on Walmart financially. According to Fortune 500, Walmart still had $351 billion (~$524 billion in 2025) in revenue ($11 billion in profit) in 2007, a new high for the corporation.

On December 3, 2008, the family of Walmart service worker Jdimytai Damour, who was killed by a stampede of shoppers frantically entering a Walmart store in Valley Stream, New York, on Black Friday (November 28), filed a wrongful death lawsuit against the corporation; Damour's family alleged Walmart of encouraging a mass number of customers to come to the store simultaneously. In addition, the Occupational Safety and Health Administration cited Walmart for "...inadequate crowd management following the Nov. 28, 2008, death of an employee at its Valley Stream, New York, store. The worker died of asphyxiation after being knocked to the ground and trampled by a crowd of about 2,000 shoppers who surged into the store for its annual 'Blitz Friday' pre-holiday sales event." The company went on to spend an estimated $2 million in legal fees fighting OSHA's $7,000 fine, because it apparently wished to prevent OSHA from establishing a precedent that would enable OSHA to influence Walmart's crowd control measures in the future.

=== Countries of operation ===
As of 2023, Walmart stores operate in Botswana, Canada, Chile, China, Costa Rica, El Salvador, Ghana, Guatemala, Honduras, India, Kenya, Lesotho, Malawi, Mexico, Mozambique, Namibia, Nicaragua, Nigeria, South Africa, Eswatini, Tanzania, Uganda, the United States (including Puerto Rico), and Zambia.

== See also ==
- Criticism of Walmart
- List of Walmart brands
- List of assets owned by Walmart
