= Garrett Chisolm =

American football player (born 1988)

No. 71
- Position: Guard

Personal information
- Born: April 2, 1988 (age 38); Charleston, South Carolina
- Listed height: 6 ft 6 in (1.98 m)
- Listed weight: 312 lb (142 kg)

Career information
- High school: Charleston (SC) West Ashley High School
- College: South Carolina
- NFL draft: 2011: undrafted

Career history
- Miami Dolphins (2011)*; Carolina Panthers (2011)*; Baltimore Ravens (2011)*; San Francisco 49ers (2012)*; Carolina Panthers (2013)*
- * Offseason or practice squad member only

Awards and highlights
- Second-team All-SEC (2010)
- Stats at Pro Football Reference

Garrett Chisolm (born April 2, 1988) is an American former football offensive guard for the Carolina Panthers of the National Football League (NFL). He played college football as an offensive lineman for the South Carolina Gamecocks. As a senior, the former walk-on was selected as a second-team All-SEC player, was a semi-finalist for the William V. Campbell Trophy, won 2011 Gamecock Inspiration Award, was named to the 2010 SEC Football Community Service Team, and was nominated by Steve Spurrier for the Rudy Awards. Chisolm tore his Anterior cruciate ligament after the 2010 SEC Championship Game against the Auburn Tigers. Chisolm play for many teams which include the Miami Dolphins, San Francisco 49ers, Baltimore Ravens and the Carolina Panthers.

== Early life ==
Born in Charleston, South Carolina, Chisolm attended West Ashley High School in Charleston, South Carolina. He played football his junior year for West Ashley and also threw the shot put and discus for the track team. After graduating from high school in 2006, Chisolm was not recruited by the major college football powers. He attended Pikeville College in Kentucky and later enrolled Trident Technical College in Charleston.

== University of South Carolina ==
=== 2009 season ===
In 2008, Chisolm enrolled at the University of South Carolina. After spending one year at South Carolina, Chisolm tried out for the South Carolina Gamecocks football team as an unrecruited walk-on football player. He started practicing with the scout team in August 2009 and quickly drew the attention of the coaching staff. Head coach Steve Spurrier recalled, "I remember one day coach Lorenzo Ward said, 'That new kid over there has knocked our guys on their butts.'" Spurrier was also impressed by Chisolm's work ethic: "He's got a wonderful attitude that hopefully will rub off on all these other players. As a coach, you love those kind of guys. You love those guys that really act like this is important to them."

Chisolm made the team as an offensive lineman and earned his first start in early November 2009. After earning his third consecutive start against Clemson, Chisolm's quick rise to the starting lineup for an SEC squad was described as "one of the best stories in the league." Reminding the press that Chisolm had not even joined the team until two weeks before the season started, offensive line coach Eric Wolford said, "I wouldn't think that's ever happened in the history of the SEC. It may have, but it was probably a long time ago." Strength and conditioning coach Craig Fitzgerald also noted the remarkable nature of Chisolm's accomplishments:

"You can go an entire career and you'll never see another story like this, never. ... If you're a walk-on in the [Southeastern Conference], you're lucky if you finish out your eligibility by being a part-timer on special teams. You might start a few games along the way as a part-time fullback. You don't become a starter in a couple of months, especially on the offensive line."

During the 2009 season, Chisolm established himself as one of the best players on the squad. Chris Low, SEC specialist for ESPN.com, said of Chisolm: "He really is one of the best success stories in this league, starting his career as a walk-on, working his way up to where he's not only a part of that offensive line but he's an integral part of that offensive line and now starting."

=== 2010 season ===
In the months before his senior year, Chisolm's parents, who ran a janitorial service in Charleston, both died of cancer. His mother, Purcella, died of ovarian cancer on January 8, 2010, and Chisolm considered leaving school to help his father run the family's janitorial business. He stayed in school, but spent hours driving 115 miles between Columbia and Charleston, "often taking off just after practice to help his father, Garrett Sr., after the death of his mother." In the spring, his father developed a cough which was eventually diagnosed as lung cancer. Chisolm stayed in school, but continued to make the 115-mile drive from Columbia to Charleston to see his father. His father died on September 15, 2010. Despite the loss of both parents, Chisolm continued to compete for the 2010 South Carolina Gamecocks football team and helped lead the team to its first SEC East football title.

Adding to the obstacles facing Chisolm in his senior year, Chisolm suffered an ACL injury that ultimately required surgery in January 2011 to surgically repair his right leg.

Having joined the team as an unrecruited walk-on, Chisolm became a second-team All-SEC player and also won several academic awards, including the Harold White GPA Award. In September 2010, Chisolm was selected as a semifinalist for the William V. Campbell Trophy, awarded annually to the top scholar-athlete in college football. He was also named to the 2010 SEC Football Community Service Team for his volunteer work reading at elementary schools, feeding the homeless, and preparing food for the needy at the Harvest of Hope food bank. He also won the Gamecock Inspiration Award in April 2011 as South Carolina's most inspirational athlete during the 2010–2011 academic year. South Carolina head coach Steve Spurrier also nominated Chisolm for the Rudy Awards.

In April 2011, Chisolm was the subject of an in-depth feature story by Yahoo Sports. In the story, Jason Cole described Chisolm's story as follows: "To find a man out of tryout who is big enough, athletic enough and smart enough to play major college football is as likely as finding a wild iguana in the far reaches of Canada, even if you give that guy two years to get ready. Chisolm did it in the space of three months and then came back as a full-time starter the following season."

=== 2014 season ===
November 2014, Chisolm decided to retire from football due to health reason.

== Professional career ==
In July 2011, Chisolm signed a contract with the Miami Dolphins of the National Football League. He spent most of the pre-season on the injured list while recovering from ACL surgery. He was cut on September 4, 2011, in the Dolphins' final round of cuts, but he was then signed as a practice squad member of the 2011 Miami Dolphins. He was released from the practice squad on September 12.

Chisolm was signed by the San Francisco 49ers on February 1, 2012. He was waived/injured on August 13, 2012, and subsequently reverted to injured reserve on August 15. He was given an injury settlement and released from injured reserve on August 20.
