= West Ashley =

Neighbourhood in Charleston, South Carolina, United States

Coordinates: 32.8071282°N 80.0646682°W

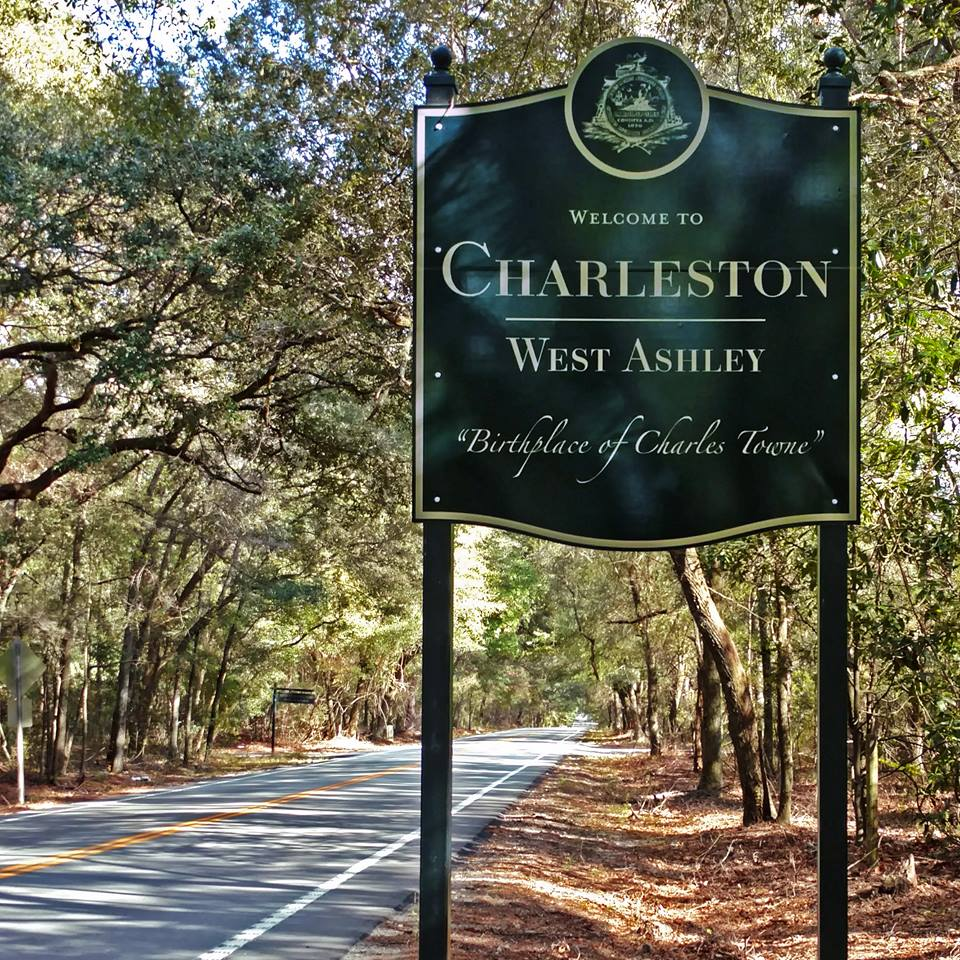
Welcome to Charleston - West Ashley - Birthplace of Charles Towne

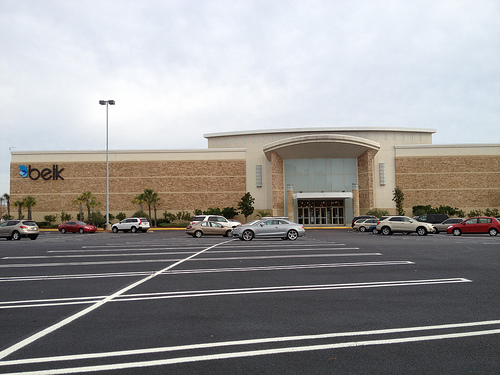
Citadel Mall in West Ashley

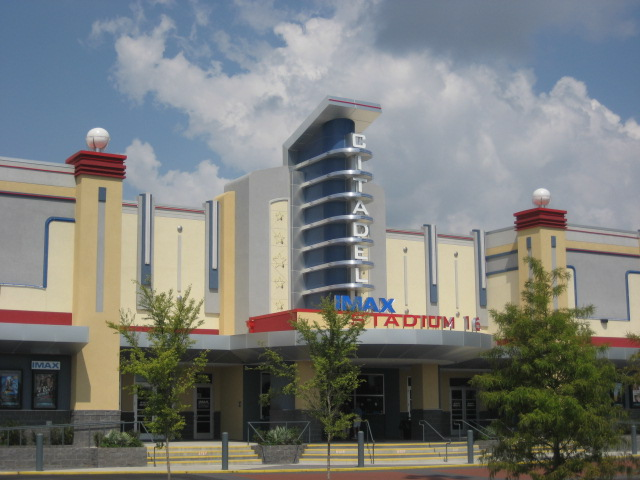
IMAX Stadium 16 Cinemas at Citadel Mall

West Ashley, or more formally, west of the Ashley, is one of the six distinct areas of the city proper of Charleston, South Carolina. As of July 2022, its estimated population was 83,996. Its name is derived from the fact that the land is west of the Ashley River.

== Description ==
The first neighborhoods west of the Ashley were developed in the postwar period of the 1950s. The area is flanked by the scenic waterfront vistas and marshes of the Ashley and Stono rivers and ancient moss-draped oak trees. The largest residential and business development took place during the 1970s and 1980s, following suburban highway development that eased commuting.. As Interstate 526 (I-526) was built in the early 1980s, and the South Carolina Highway 461 (SC 461 (Glenn McConnell Parkway) was built in the 1990s to accommodate traffic on the historic SC 61 (Ashley River Road) corridor, explosive residential and commercial growth took place in the area. Major retailers located in this community as the large plots of land needed for "big box" stores was not available on the historic downtown Charleston peninsula.

West Ashley's original neighborhoods line (U.S. Route 17 (US 17; Savannah Highway)) in an area closest to the historic Charleston peninsula. The earliest retail district, built in the 1950s, is being revitalized, attracting many art and design-oriented businesses in the early 21st century..

The community's major arteries include SC 7 (Sam Rittenberg Boulevard), SC 61 (Ashley River Road), US 17 (Savannah Highway), SC 461 (Paul Cantrell Boulevard/Glenn McConnell Parkway), and I-526. It also is served by the West Ashley Greenway, a popular rail trail that parallels Savannah Highway.

West Ashley is home to Citadel Mall, the region's largest indoor shopping mall and Bon Secours St. Francis Hospital. These two constitute major employers of the region.. WCSC-TV Channel 5, the area's CBS affiliate and first television station to sign on the air in Charleston in 1953, moved to a newly constructed broadcast facility in West Ashley in 1997. West Ashley has an independent weekly community newspaper titled West Of, which publishes news pertaining to the area.

West Ashley is not a self-governed city or town. The majority of the area west of the Ashley is located within the city limits of Charleston. A few remaining pockets in unincorporated Charleston County are served by the Saint Andrews Public Service District, which provides municipal services for areas outside the city limits.

== History ==
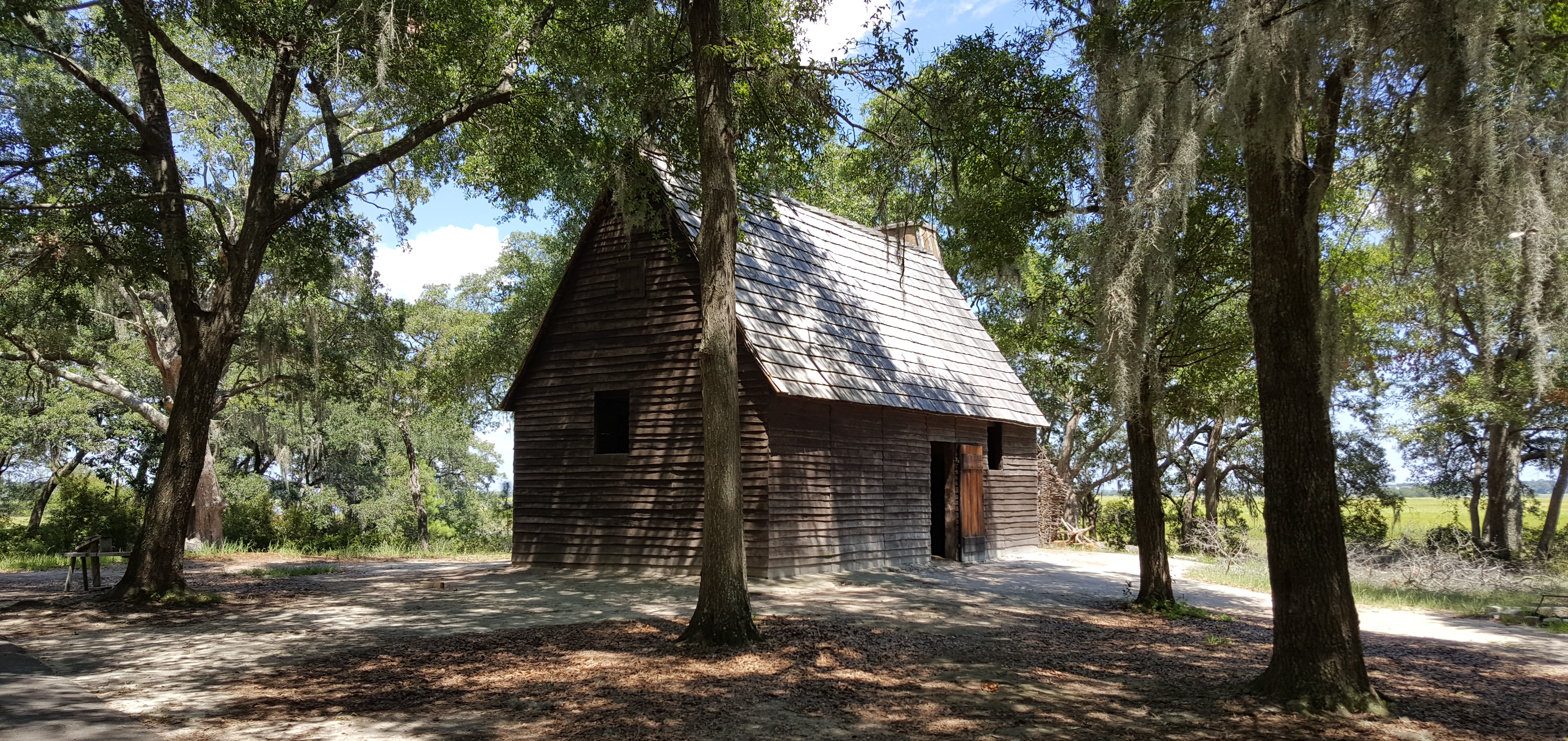
Cabin at Charles Towne Landing

West Ashley is noted as the birthplace of Charleston, where English colonists established the first permanent settlement in the Carolina colony at Albemarle Point in 1670. Local Native Americans, particularly the Kiawah, led the colonists from the ship Carolina to a suitable settling ground. It is believed that the Indians welcomed the colonists, in the hope they might provide defense against the constant raids by the slaving Westo Indians from Georgia (originally known as the Erie). The original settlement, which was built in an unorganized manner, built fortifications early on due to fears of an invasion by the Spanish. In 1680, the settlement was moved to the Charleston peninsula, in between the Ashley and Cooper rivers. The 663-acre (2.68 km^{2}) area of the original settlement's location has been preserved as a state historic site known as Charles Towne Landing.

A few skirmishes took place there in the American Revolution during which time parts of the area faced occupation by British forces, specifically at Rantowles Creek, where William Washington defeated cavalry forces under Banastre Tarleton, and at Old St. Andrew's Presbyterian Church during the 1780 Siege of Charleston conducted by the British. Thousands of slaves escaped to British lines and some fought with the British, qualifying for freedom and evacuation with their troops when the British withdrew from the colony.

For much of its history, West Ashley had a focus primarily on agriculture, hosting several slave plantations prior to the Civil War.

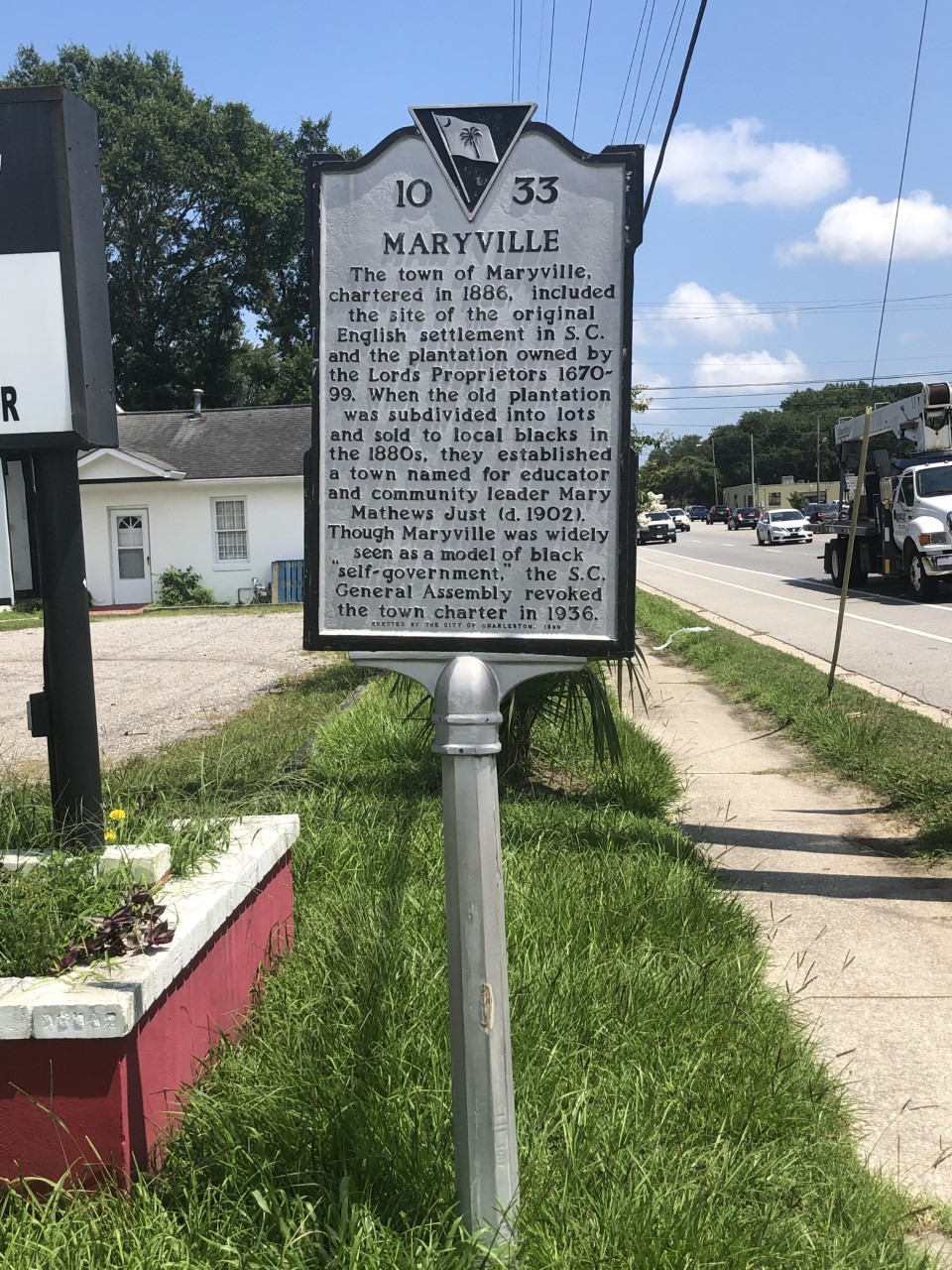
This historic marker was placed in 1999 to indicate the location of the town of Maryville, an early South Carolina town governed by African Americans from 1886 to 1936.

Some military activity took place here during the Civil War. The area had several batteries, including those at Fort Bull (near present-day Bees Ferry Road), but no major battles occurred. Sherman's forces did burn down Middleton Place Plantation in the 1865 march to the sea. The Charleston and Savannah Railway extended from downtown to West Ashley during the 19th century, and the Union had attempted to cut it off in 1864, but were beaten back at the Battle of Burden's Causeway on nearby Johns Island.

West Ashley also includes the historic location of Maryville, a defunct town. Originally chartered in 1886 and incorporated in 1888, Maryville included the site of the original English settlement, now the site of Charles Towne Landing State Historic Park, and a plantation owned by the Lords Proprietors. Land at the former plantation site was divided and sold to African-American residents in the late 1880s. Following the death of her husband, Mary Mathews Just purchased land at the site of the former Hillsborough Plantation and named Maryville for herself. In the year following its incorporation, Maryville was reported as having "two churches, four stores, and seventy houses, which have been erected in two years. Six hundred and forty-four building lots sold in three years."

The town's elected council held regular meetings to elect members, address public building projects, and raise taxes to pay for necessary infrastructure. Notable town buildings and public spaces included a two-story police station and town hall, the Frederick Demming Jr. Industrial School for Blacks, and Invincible Park. Invincible Park housed a pavilion and hosted many events, including dances and concerts. The South Carolina General Assembly revoked the town's charter in 1936 despite its success as a model for African-American "self government."

Ashley Hall Plantation and Magnolia Plantation and Gardens are listed on the National Register of Historic Places.

== West Ashley neighborhoods ==
- Air Harbor
- Albemarle Point
- Ardmore
- Asheford Place
- Ashland Plantation
- Ashley Forest
- Ashley Hall Manor
- Ashley Hall Plantation
- Ashley Harbor
- Ashley Park Townhomes
- Ashley Towne Landing
- Ashleyville
- Avondale
- Battery Haig
- Bolton's Landing
- Byrnes Downs
- Canterbury Woods
- Capri Isle
- Carolina Bay
- Carolina Terrace
- Charlestowne Estates
- Church Creek
- Citadel Woods
- Croghan Landing
- Dogwood
- Drayton on the Ashley
- East Oak Forest
- Edgewater Park
- Forest Lakes
- Geddes Hall
- Governor's Point
- Grand Oaks Plantation
- Harrison Acres
- Heathwood
- Hickory Farms
- Hickory Hill
- Hunt Club
- Huntington Woods
- Hutton Place
- Indigo Point
- Isle De Nemours
- Lenevar
- MacLaura Hall
- Magnolia Bluff
- Marsh Cove
- Maryville
- McLaura Bluff
- Melrose
- Memminger Hall
- Middleborough Estates
- Middleton Cove
- Moreland
- Northbridge Terrace
- Oakland
- Old Towne Acres
- Orange Grove Estates
- Orange Grove Shores
- Orleans Woods
- Parkdale
- Parkshore
- Parkshore 3
- Parkwood Estates
- Pierpont
- Pinecrest Gardens
- Pinepoint
- Ponderosa
- Providence Commons
- Red Top
- Rice Hollow
- Rotherwood Estates
- Saint Andrews
- Sandhurst
- Savannah (The)
- Schieveling Plantation
- Seagate Village
- Shadowmoss Plantation
- Sherwood Forest
- South Windermere
- Springfield
- Stone Creek
- Stono Park
- Sunday Hill
- Sylvan Shores
- The Crescent
- Village Green
- Wappoo Heights
- Wappoo Shores
- Washington Park
- Wespanee Plantation
- West Ashley Plantation
- West Oak Forest
- Westwood
- Windermere

== Education ==
The community formerly served by two public high schools is now served by one, West Ashley High School, with 2,043 students and 135 full-time teachers. West Ashley High School was created by the merging of Middleton and St. Andrews high schools. There are also seven public elementary schools (Drayton Hall, Springfield, St. Andrews School of Math and Science, Oakland, Stono Park, Orange Grove, and Ashley River Creative Arts), and four public middle schools (C.E. Williams, Orange Grove, Montessori Community School, and West Ashley). Among the numerous private schools in the West Ashley area are Porter-Gaud School, a K-12 grade college preparatory school founded in 1867.

== Major commercial areas ==
- Ashley Landing (formerly Ashley Plaza Mall)
- Citadel Mall

== Notable people ==
- Ernest Everett Just, noted African American biologist and zoologist, born in Maryville.
- Darius Rucker, lead singer of the band Hootie and the Blowfish, grew up in West Ashley. He graduated from Middleton High School.
- Stephen Colbert, host of The Late Show with Stephen Colbert, graduated from Porter-Gaud School located in West Ashley.

== External links with photos of West Ashley ==
- West Of newspaper, official website
- CharlesTowne Landing State Historic Site
- Ashley River Road Links
- Historic Drayton Hall
- Historic Magnolia Plantation & Gardens
- The Official Website of the City of Charleston
- Byrnes Downs Garden Club Scrapbook
- west of the Ashley - Charleston, SC — forum for community events and issues
