= West Ashley High School =

High school in Charleston, South Carolina, United States

Coordinates: 32°49′10″N 80°04′25″W

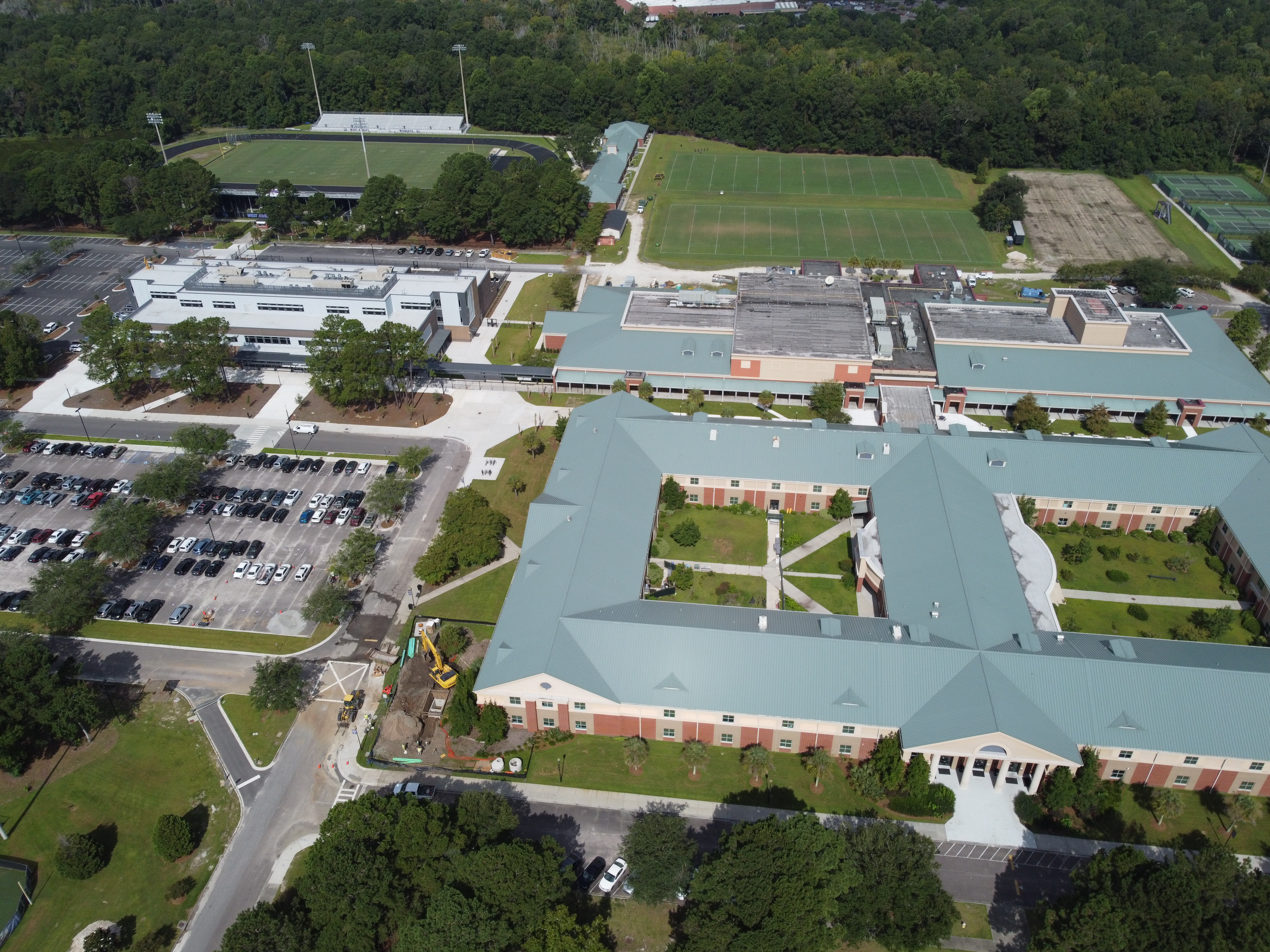
- Figure-eight shaped building, right
- 4060 West Wildcat Boulevard, Charleston, South Carolina, 29414

Information
- School type: Public high school
- Established: 2000
- CEEB code: 410420
- Principal: Andy Brandt
- Teaching staff: 121.00 (FTE)
- Secondary years taught: 9th–12th grade
- Enrollment: 2,043 (2023–2024)
- Student to teacher ratio: 16.88
- Colors: Purple and black
- Nickname: Wildcats

West Ashley High School is the only public high school located in the West Ashley area in Charleston, South Carolina, United States. It was created in 2000, when the Charleston County School District merged Middleton High School and Saint Andrews High School. It is a part of St. Andrews Constituent District #10.

== Notable events ==
On July 29, 2002, President George W. Bush visited West Ashley High School to speak about welfare reforms and other topics.

== Athletics ==
West Ashley competes in Class 5A of the SCHSL. Their main rivals are the Wando High School Warriors and the James Island Charter High School Trojans.

- Fall sports: football, volleyball, girls' tennis, cross-country, swimming
- Winter sports: basketball, wrestling
- Spring sports: soccer, track and field, lacrosse, boys' tennis, baseball, softball

=== Volleyball ===
West Ashley High School's volleyball team established one of the best programs in the state. During the 2005 season the Lady Wildcats were crowned State Champions, and the following year the Wildcats were runners-up, falling to Hillcrest High School. The team is coached by Christy Jickling, a former professional Canadian volleyball player, the wife of former ECHL South Carolina Stingrays player Mike, one of numerous former Stingrays to have settled in Charleston after their playing careers ended.

- Region Champions: 2004, 2005, 2006, 2007, 2008
- Lower-State Champions (State Runners-Up): 2006
- State Champions: 2005

=== Girls' soccer ===
- State Champions: 2002, 2003, 2005
- Lower State Runners-Up: 2004, 2006, 2012

== Notable alumni ==
- Garrett Chisolm (born 1988), former American football offensive guard
- Tre McLean (born 1993), basketball player in the Israeli Basketball Premier League
- Brett Toth (born 1996), American football offensive guard
