= SEC community service team =

Each year, the Southeastern Conference (SEC), a college athletic conference whose member institutions are located primarily in the Southern part of the United States, chooses Community Service Teams of players of various sports from among its member universities. The honor goes to players in recognition of their off-the-court/off-the-field volunteering and community service activities. The Community Service Team is meant to highlight an athlete from each SEC school in a variety of sports. The SEC began this concept with a football Community Service Team in 1994, originally called the Good Works team. The recognition has expanded to other sports over the years. Like an all-conference team or an all-American team, the Community Service Team is a hypothetical team - the members won't actually get together and play a game.

The community service and volunteering the players engage in includes volunteering in schools and for local nonprofits and communities of faith, as well as in youth-focused programs at their respective universities.

== 2018 Winners ==
2018 SEC Men's Basketball Community Service Team:

- Braxton Key, Alabama
- Trey Thompson, Arkansas
- Jared Harper, Auburn
- Kevarrius Hayes, Florida
- Yante Maten, Georgia
- Dillon Pulliam, Kentucky
- Aaron Epps, LSU
- Terence Davis, Ole Miss
- Mitchell Storm, Mississippi State
- Jeremiah Tilmon, Missouri
- Khadim Gueye, South Carolina
- Grant Williams, Tennessee
- Tonny Trocha-Morelos, Texas A&M
- Djery Baptiste, Vanderbilt

SEC Women's Basketball Community Service Team:

- Ashley Williams, Alabama
- Keiryn Swenson, Arkansas
- Bria Johnson, Auburn
- Haley Lorenzen, Florida
- Mackenzie Engram, Georgia
- Makenzie Cann, Kentucky
- Raigyne (Moncrief) Louis, LSU
- Shandricka Sessom, Ole Miss
- Blair Schaefer, Mississippi State
- Sophie Cunningham, Missouri
- A'ja Wilson, South Carolina
- Mercedes Russell, Tennessee
- Anriel Howard, Texas A&M
- Kaleigh Clemons-Green, Vanderbilt

2018 SEC Women's Swim and Dive Community Service Team:

- Christina Lu, Alabama
- Chelsea Tatlow, Arkansas
- Erin Falconer, Auburn
- Hannah Burns, Florida
- Megan Kingsley, Georgia
- Ann Davies, Kentucky
- Jane MacDougall, LSU
- Payton Conrad, Missouri
- Katie Shannahan, South Carolina
- Alex Cleveland, Tennessee
- Esther González Medina, Texas A&M

== 2017 Winners ==
2017 SEC Baseball Community Service Team:

- Mike Oczypok, Alabama
- Alex Gosser, Arkansas
- JJ Shaffer, Auburn
- Alex Faedo, Florida
- Keegan McGovern, Georgia
- Storm Wilson, Kentucky
- Jared Poche', LSU
- Thomas Dillard, Ole Miss
- Andrew Mahoney, Mississippi State
- Nolan Gromacki, Missouri
- Wil Crowe, South Carolina
- Eric Freeman, Tennessee
- Cason Sherrod, Texas A&M
- Collin Snider, Vanderbilt

2017 SEC Football Community Service Team:

- Minkah Fitzpatrick, Alabama
- Frank Ragnow, Arkansas
- Daniel Carlson, Auburn
- Johnny Townsend, Florida
- Aaron Davis, Georgia
- Jacob Hyde, Kentucky
- John David Moore, LSU
- Javon Patterson, Ole Miss
- Gabe Myles, Mississippi State
- Anthony Hines, Missouri
- Spencer Eason-Riddle, South Carolina
- Kyle Phillips, Tennessee
- Koda Martin, Texas A&M
- Tommy Openshaw, Vanderbilt

2017 SEC Gymnastics Community Service Team:

- Aja Sims, Alabama
- Heather Elswick, Arkansas
- Kullen Hlawek, Auburn
- Grace McLaughlin, Florida
- Morgan Reynolds, Georgia
- Sidney Dukes, Kentucky
- Sydney Ewing, LSU
- Becca Schugel, Missouri

2017 SEC Women's Tennis Community Service Team:

- Erin Routliffe, Alabama
- Sasha Shkorupeieva, Arkansas
- Kourtney Keegan, Florida
- Caroline Brinson, Georgia
- Morgan Chumney, Kentucky
- Joana Valle Costa, LSU
- Anastasia Rentouli, Mississippi State
- Bea Machado Santos, Missouri
- Rachel Rohrabacher, South Carolina
- Sadie Hammond, Tennessee
- Eva Paalma, Texas A&M
- Georgina Sellyn, Vanderbilt

2017 SEC Soccer Community Service Team:

- Maddy Anzelc, Alabama
- Hannah Neece, Arkansas
- Kristen Dodson, Auburn
- Courtney Douglas, Florida
- Summer Burnett, Georgia
- Jada Holmes, Kentucky
- Lily Alfeld, LSU
- Courtney Carroll, Ole Miss
- Rhylee DeCrane, Mississippi State
- Kelsey Dossey, Missouri
- Jackie Schaefer, South Carolina
- Maya Neal, Tennessee
- Haley Pounds, Texas A&M
- Gabrielle Rademaker, Vanderbilt

2017 SEC Softball Community Service Team:

- Sydney Littlejohn, Alabama
- Parker Pockington, Arkansas
- Kasey Cooper, Senior, Auburn
- Kayli Kvistad, Florida
- Maeve McGuire, Georgia
- Shannon Smith, Kentucky
- Elyse Thornhill, LSU
- Miranda Strother, Ole Miss
- Alexis Silkwood, Mississippi State
- Kirsten Mack, Missouri
- Macey Webb, South Carolina
- Megan Geer, Tennessee
- Celena Massey, Texas A&M

2017 SEC Track and Field Community Service Team:

- Steven Gayle, Alabama
- Quanesha Burks, Alabama
- Eric Janise, Arkansas
- Taliyah Brooks, Arkansas
- Xavier Coakley, Auburn
- Marshay Ryan, Auburn
- Marques Burgman, Florida
- Emily Chapman, Florida
- Bryan Kamau, Georgia
- Mary Terry, Georgia
- Noah Castle, Kentucky
- Amy Hansen, Kentucky
- LaMar Bruton, LSU
- Nataliyah Friar, LSU
- Payton Moss, Ole Miss
- Mercedes Mattix, Ole Miss
- Curtis Thompson, Mississippi State
- Leah Lott, Mississippi State
- Taylor Stephen, Missouri
- Hannah Thomas, Missouri
- Ryan Bermudez, South Carolina
- Maya Evans, South Carolina
- Drew Kelley, Tennessee
- Cassie Wertman, Tennessee
- Robert Grant, Texas A&M
- Madalaine Stulce, Texas A&M
- Skyler Carpenter, Vanderbilt

2017 SEC Volleyball Community Service Team:

- Cidavia Hall, Alabama
- Kelly O'Brien, Arkansas
- Macy Reece, Auburn
- Ann-Lorrayne Bzoch, Florida
- Kendall Kazor, Georgia
- Darian Mack, Kentucky
- Cheyenne Wood, LSU
- Caroline Adams, Ole Miss
- Kanani Price, Mississippi State
- Ali Kreklow, Missouri
- Courtney Furlong, South Carolina
- Erica Treiber, Tennessee
- Amy Houser, Texas A&M

== Past winners ==
- Makeba Alcide
- Garrett Chisolm
- Rotnei Clarke
- Peter Dyakowski
- Mustapha Heron
- Malcolm Mitchell
- Nerlens Noel
- Jacob Tamme
- Tyler Wilson

== See also ==
- Walter Payton NFL Man of the Year Award (football)
- Allstate AFCA Good Works Team
- Bart Starr Award (football)
- Arthur Ashe Courage Award
- NBA Community Assist Award (basketball)
- J. Walter Kennedy Citizenship Award (basketball)
- Laureus Sport for Good Award
- List of volunteer awards
