= Middletown High School =

Middletown High School can refer to:

- Middletown High School (California) in Middletown, California
- Middletown High School (Connecticut) in Middletown, Connecticut
- Middletown High School (Delaware) in Middletown, Delaware
- Middletown High School (Maryland) in Middletown, Maryland
- Middletown High School North, in Middletown Township, New Jersey
- Middletown High School South, in Middletown Township, New Jersey
- Middletown High School (New York) in Middletown, Orange County, New York
- Middletown High School (Ohio) in Middletown, Ohio
- Middletown Area High School (Pennsylvania) in Middletown, Dauphin County, Pennsylvania
- Middletown High School (Rhode Island) in Middletown, Rhode Island

== See also ==
- Middleton High School (disambiguation)
