= Tre McLean =

American basketball player

No. 24 – Guaiqueríes de Margarita
- Position: Small forward / shooting guard
- League: Superliga Profesional de Baloncesto

Personal information
- Born: October 19, 1993 (age 33) Charleston, South Carolina, U.S.
- Listed height: 6 ft 5 in (1.96 m)
- Listed weight: 205 lb (93 kg)

Career information
- High school: West Ashley (Charleston, South Carolina)
- College: Queens (2012–2013); Chattanooga (2014–2017)
- NBA draft: 2017: undrafted
- Playing career: 2017–present

Career history
- 2017–2018: Parma
- 2018–2019: Avtodor Saratov
- 2019: Parma
- 2019–2020: Brose Bamberg
- 2020–2021: Peristeri
- 2021–2022: Split
- 2022: Apollon Patras
- 2022: Abejas de León
- 2022–2023: Hapoel Gilboa Galil
- 2023–present: Guaiqueríes de Margarita

Career highlights
- LNBP champion (2022); LNBP All-Star (2022); First-team All-SoCon (2016); Third-team All-SoCon (2017)

Tre McLean (born October 19, 1993) is an American professional basketball player for Guaiqueríes de Margarita of the Superliga Profesional de Baloncesto. He played college basketball for the Queens College and Chattanooga Mocs.

== High school career ==
McLean attended West Ashley High School at Charleston, South Carolina. As a senior at West Ashley, McLean averaged 16.2 points, 2.7 steals and 2.2 assists per game, leading the Wildcats to a 20-6 record as a senior and to the third round of the South Carolina Class 4A playoffs.

== College career ==
=== Queens College ===
McLean started his college career with Queens College, where he played for one year. He averaged 5 points and 5.1 rebounds per game, being the second best rebounder of the team.

=== Chattanooga ===
The following year, he was transferred to Chattanooga, where he stayed for the next 3 years. As a senior, McLean averaged 13.7 points and 5.4 rebounds per game, earning All-Southern Conference recognition. During his tenure with the Mocs, he averaged 10 points, 4.9 rebounds, 1.9 assists and 1.3 steals per game.

== Professional career ==
After going undrafted in the 2017 NBA draft, McLean joined Parma of the VTB United League. After a decent season with Parma, he joined Avtodor Saratov, the following season, before returning once again to Parma in order to finish the season with the Russian club.

On July 5, 2019, McLean joined Brose Bamberg of the Basketball Bundesliga.

On October 7, 2020, he signed a short term deal with Peristeri of the Greek Basket League, replacing the injured Christos Saloustros in the team΄s squad. He subsequently re-signed for the remainder of the season. In 2021, McLean joined Split of the Adriatic League and the Croatian League, averaging 12.8 points and 4.8 rebounds per game.

On January 13, 2022, McLean signed with Apollon Patras of the Greek Basket League. In 13 games, he averaged 10.4 points, 5.5 rebounds, 1.4 assists and 1 steal, playing around 31 minutes per contest.

In June 2022, McLean joined Abejas de León of the Liga Nacional de Baloncesto Profesional (LNBP) in Mexico. He earned All-Star honors and led his team to a LNBP title.

On December 12, 2022, he signed with Hapoel Gilboa Galil of the Israeli Basketball Premier League. On February 25, 2023, McLean signed with Guaiqueríes de Margarita of the Superliga Profesional de Baloncesto.
