= Ashley Hall Plantation =

Historic house in South Carolina, United States

- U.S. National Register of Historic Places
- U.S. Historic district
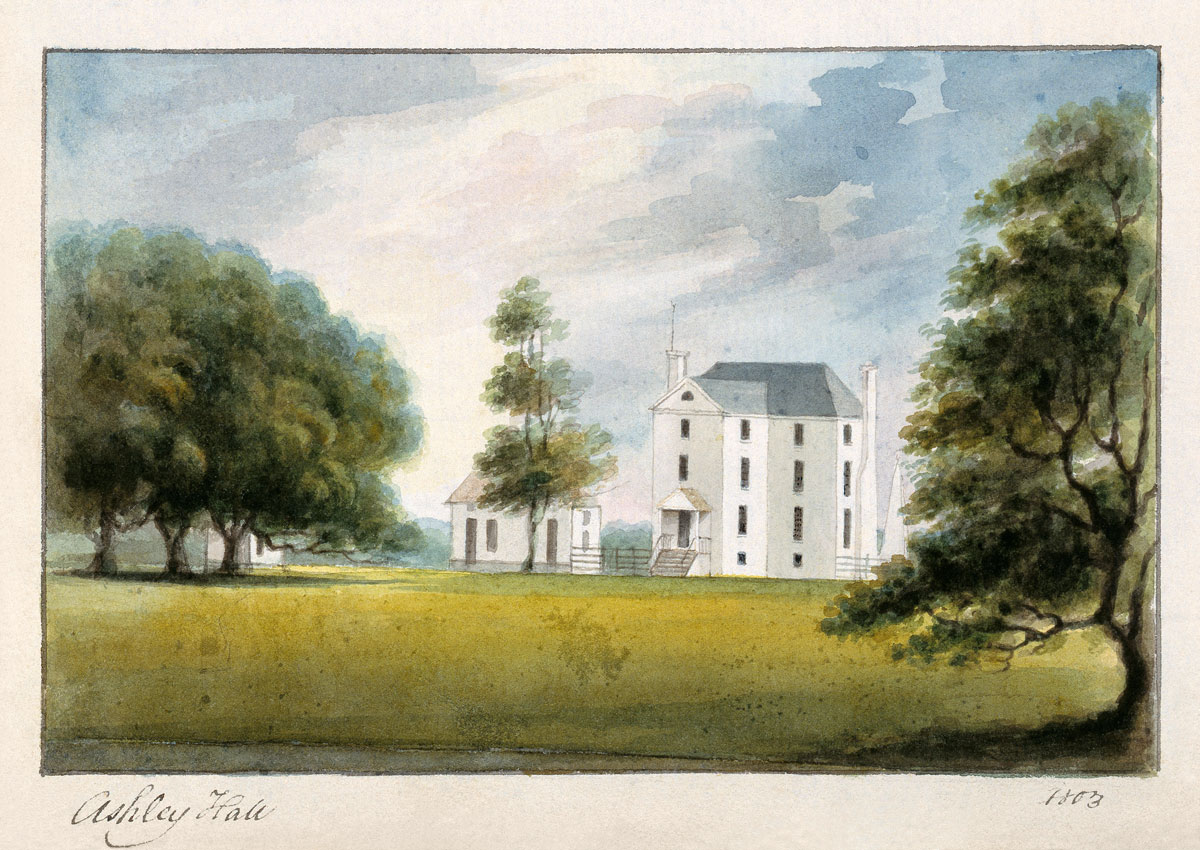
- Nearest city: West Ashley, South Carolina
- Area: 38 acres (15 ha)
- Built: c. 1675, 1704
- NRHP reference No.: 75001691
- Added to NRHP: June 5, 1975

Ashley Hall Plantation is a historic plantation complex located on the Ashley River near West Ashley, Charleston County, South Carolina. The plantation was established in the early 1670s by Stephen Bull. It was listed on the National Register of Historic Places in 1975.

== History ==
The earliest occupants of the property now known as Ashley Hall Plantation were Native Americans, based on the high concentration of artifacts that have been found on the site.

In the early 1670s, English immigrant Stephen Bull established Ashley Hall Plantation on 400 acres (160 ha) along the Ashley River near Charleston, South Carolina. It was one of the first white settlements along the river. Bull named his plantation for Anthony Ashley-Cooper, 3rd Earl of Shaftesbury, a Lords Proprietor of the colony under who Bull whom Bull had served.

Bull was a planter, trader, and explorer who helped the South Carolina Colony negotiate with Native Americans in the 17th century. He built a small tabby-walled one-story house around 1675; this is one of the oldest standing houses in the state. In 1694, Ball added 100 acres (40 ha) to the plantation.

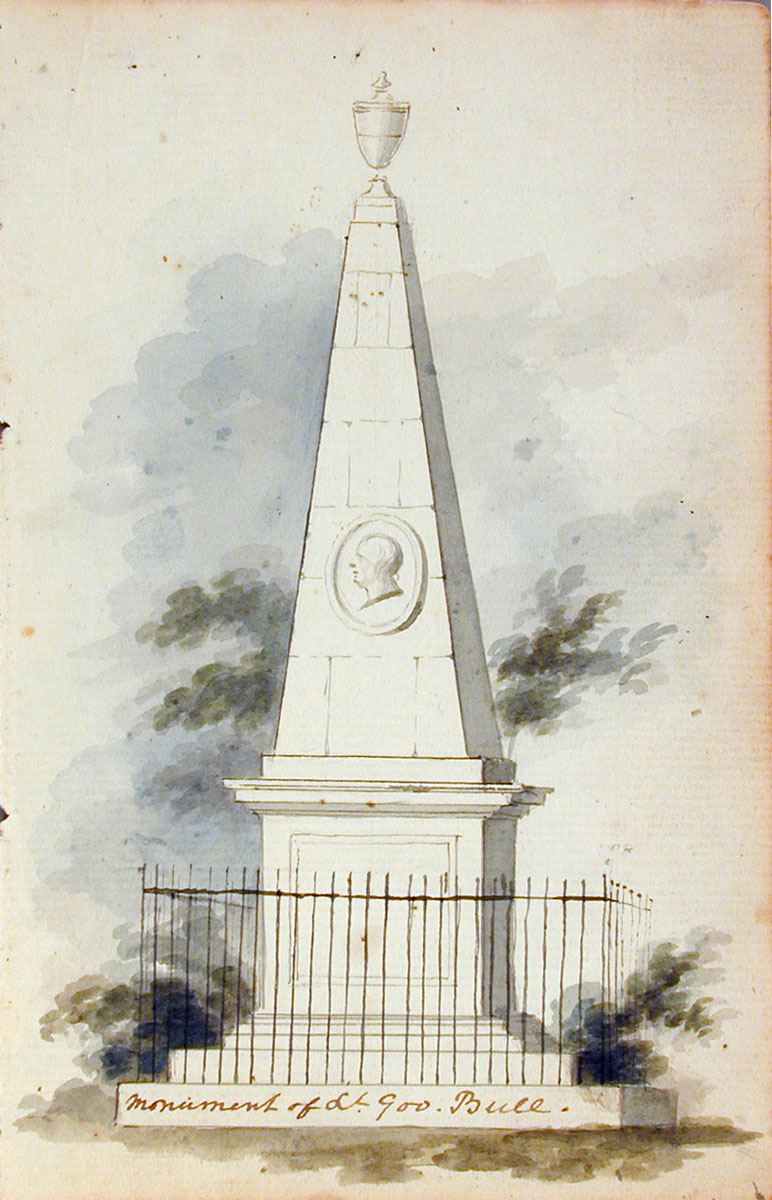
Charles Fraser painted the monument at Ashley Hall to Lieutenant Governor Bull about 1800.

In 1704, Bull's son, William Bull, built a two-story brick Georgian plantation house; an Italianate garden and open park was added to the property later in the 18th century. He added 500 acres (200 ha) to the plantation in 1707. William Buill became the colony's governor in November 1737. Around 1791, the governor's widow installed a stone obelisk monument to honor her late husband.

William Bull II inherited the property from his parents. He served as acting governor of South Carolina in 1760 and 1775. He also followed his grandfather in working as a diplomate to the Native Americans. in Under his leadership, treaties with the Catawba of South Carolina and the Iroquiois Confederacy were signed at Ashley Hall Plantation. The peace treaty to end the Cherokee War of 1763 was also signed at Ashley Hall. After the Revolutionary War, William Bull II returned to England and gave the plantation to his nephew William Bull.

Colonel William Izard Bull made updates to the house in the 19th century, including adding a third story and red sandstone steps in 1853. However, the plantation house was burned in 1865 during the American Civil War to prevent its destruction by Union forces. The family sold the plantation in 1883; Colonel Bull was the last member of the Bull family to live at Ashley Hall Plantation.

The plantation was sold several times before John William Kennerty purchased 1,000 acres (400 ha) in 1900. Kennerly failed and farming and sold the property to the owner who added a large two-story house in 1904. However, Kennerly's son, William Charles Kennerty acquired the plantation in 1919. When he died in the 1930s, the plantation was divided between his wife and two children. However, they sold all but 30 acres (12 ha) because of high property taxes.

The 1,000 acres (400 ha) property was sold to Julius Jahnz for $30,000 ($954,770 in 2024). In the run up to World War I, some locals circulated a rumor that German-born Jahnz was shipping large amounts of concrete to his new property to erect a German fortress. In reality, Jahnz was using the concrete to construct a modern creamery on 400 acres (160 ha) of the property. Jahnz also undertook the clean-up of the grounds, including the ruins of the Bull house. Jahnz also added a monument erected to Bull's memory.

It was listed on the National Register of Historic Places on June 5, 1975. Today, the house and its relocated structures are located on 38 acres (15 ha) near West Ashley, South Carolina. Part of the former plantation is now a residential development.

== Architecture ==
The property includes a small tabby-walled house (c. 1675) with a 20th-century second-story addition, the ruins of the Georgian plantation house (1704), a monument to the second governor, William Bull (c. 1791), two prehistoric Indian archaeological sites, and two 18th-century well sites associated with the plantation.
