= Northwoods Mall (North Charleston, South Carolina) =

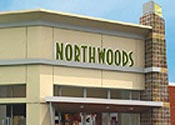
- Location: North Charleston, South Carolina, United States
- Coordinates: 32.944113°N 80.044241°W
- Address: 2150 Northwoods Boulevard
- Opened: 1972
- Developer: Buckner Land Company
- Manager: CBL Properties
- Owner: CBL Properties
- Num. of stores: 101
- Num. of anchor tenants: 4
- Floor area: 833,833 square feet (77,466 m^{2}) (GLA)
- Floors: 1 (2 in JCPenney)
- Website: shopnorthwoodsmall.com

Northwoods Mall is a 101-store super-regional 833,833-square-foot (77,465.6 m^{2}) indoor shopping mall located in North Charleston, South Carolina. It is the second largest indoor shopping mall in the Tri-County area next to Citadel Mall. Built in 1972, the mall is located at the intersection of Rivers Avenue (U.S. Highway 52), Ashley Phosphate Road and Interstate 26. Northwoods Mall was the first regional indoor shopping mall constructed in the South Carolina lowcountry and featured Belk, Sears, and the locally owned Kerrison's department stores as its original anchor tenants. A food court offers options such as Charleys Philly Steaks and Sbarro. The mall's anchor stores are Dillard's, Belk, JCPenney and Burlington. Northwoods Mall also features Books-A-Million and Planet Fitness as inline junior anchors.

The mall also once housed a Woolworth's but it was remodeled into the food court in 1997. In 1989 the mall closed its small theater in favor of a multi-screen complex located just outside of Dillard's. The mall underwent a significant expansion and renovation in 1985 and Thalhimer's was added as an anchor tenant. Lost in the remodel was a Morrison's Cafeteria located next to Kerrison's.

In 1992 Thalhimer's was sold to Dillard's. The store would later be expanded in 2004. Also in 1992, Kerrison's was closed and demolished. It would be replaced by a two-level JCPenney in February 1993 that was relocating from the nearby Charles Towne Square which was beginning a steep decline at the time. The first Disney Store in South Carolina opened at Northwoods Mall in April 1993. Northwoods Mall was purchased in 1984 by Jacobs, Visconsi & Jacobs (later known as the Richard E. Jacobs group), owners and developers of Charleston's Citadel Mall, and later sold to current owners CBL & Associates Properties who again remodeled the mall in 2004. CBL & Associates Properties owned Citadel Mall until defaulting on mortgage payments and losing it to the lien-holder in a foreclosure sale in 2014.

In 2015, Sears Holdings spun off 235 of its properties, including the Sears at Northwoods Mall, into Seritage Growth Properties. Sears closed its store in July 2017 and the building was subdivided with half left vacant and half becoming Burlington. Carrabba's is also an outparcel on the Seritage site.
