= Charles Towne Landing =

- Site of Old Charles Towne
- U.S. National Register of Historic Places
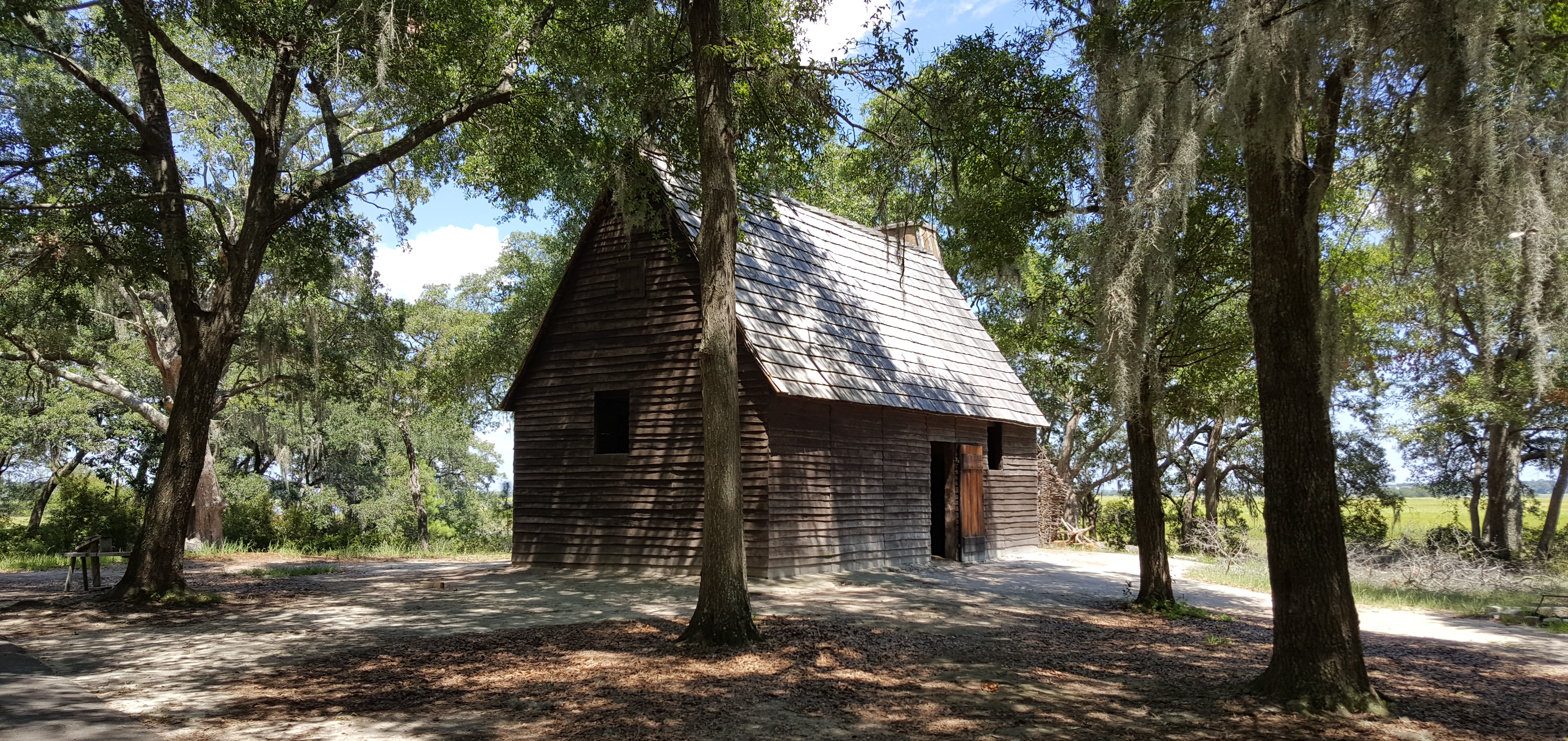
- Cabin at Charles Towne Landing, August 2016

- Location within South Carolina Location within the United States
- Location: 1500 Old Towne Road
- Nearest city: Charleston, South Carolina
- Coordinates: 32°48′27″N 79°59′13″W
- Area: 184 acres (74 ha)
- Built: 1670
- NRHP reference No.: 69000162
- Added to NRHP: December 17, 1969

Charles Towne Landing State Historic Site in the West Ashley area of Charleston, South Carolina, preserves the original site of the first permanent English settlement in Carolina. Originally opened in 1970 to commemorate South Carolina's tricentennial, this 664-acre (269 ha) site is home to an exhibit hall, rental facility, a natural habitat zoo, ongoing archeological excavations, miles of trails, dozens of picnic tables, a replica tall ship, six fireable replica cannon, and much more.

The Tricentennial Commission selected Corkern and Wiggins of Hilton Head, South Carolina in 1968 to design the exhibition pavilion at the site. When public comments criticized a drawing of the proposed pavilion, a member of the Tricentennial Commission released a second drawing that, he claimed, would better present the structure; he noted also that the pavilion would be built near the location of the Old Town egg factory and not on the site of the Waring gardens. Many delays pushed the opening of the pavilion past the opening of the park itself. Problems with the roof of the pavilion were more complicated to fix than expected, and the discussion with the contractor and engineers over repairs continued into June 1970. Plans were finally agreed upon to reinforce the roof with additional columns. The pavilion eventually opened on July 16, 1970. During Hurricane Hugo, the pavilion was damaged and never repaired; permission to demolish the pavilion (and other park buildings) was granted in November 2002.

== Living history ==
=== Experimental Crop Garden ===
The Experimental Crop Garden showcases crops planted by early colonists for food and profit. While offerings vary seasonally, sugarcane and indigo, two attempted cash crops, are frequently visible.

=== Adventure ===
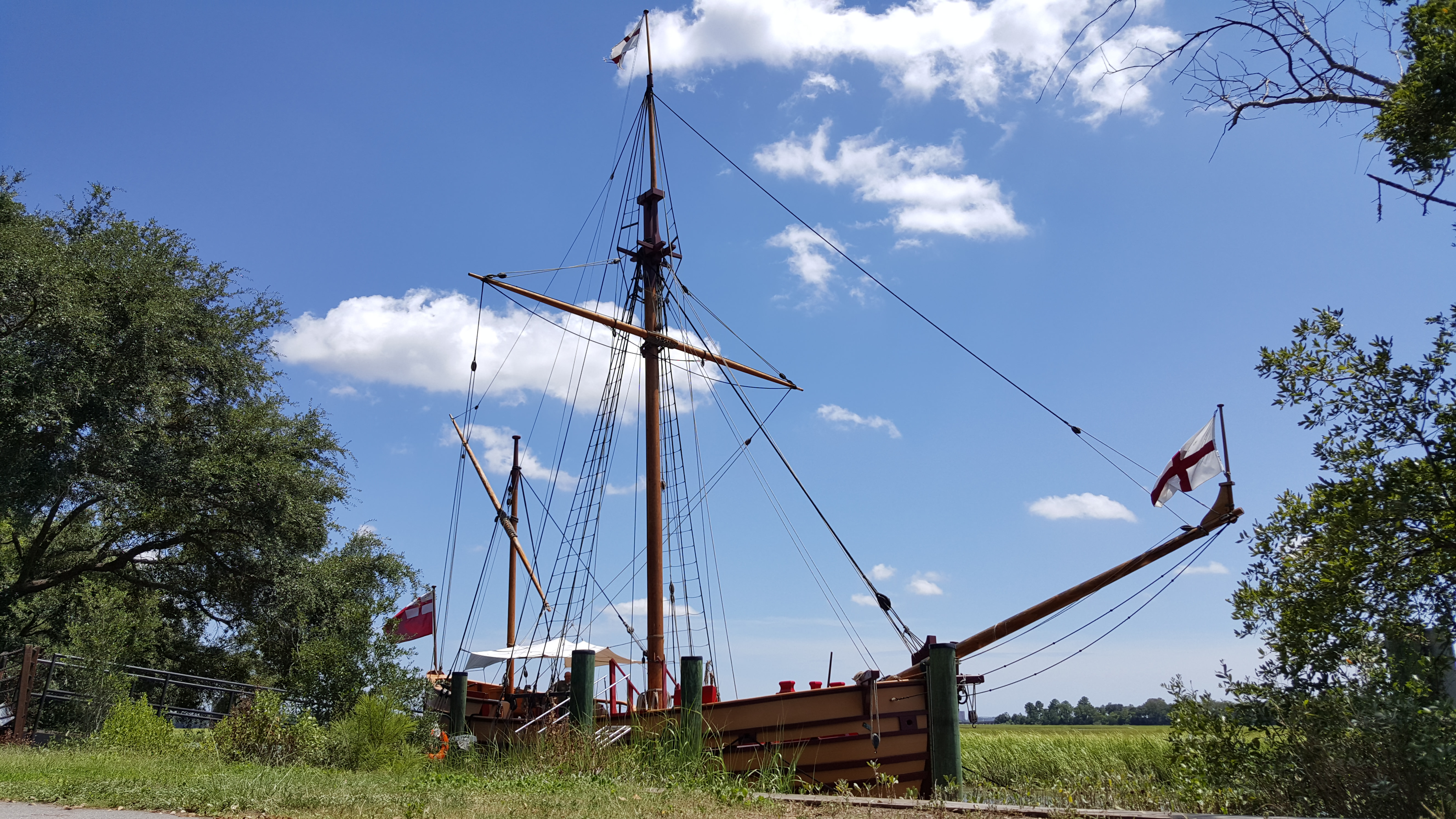
Adventure, August 2016

Adventure is a replica of a ketch, a popular style of 17th-century cargo vessel. Similar ships carried commercial goods, foodstuffs, and even livestock between New York, Barbados, and everywhere in between. Renowned 20th century naval architect and historian William Avery Baker designed Adventure in 1969. The first Adventure served Charles Towne Landing from 1970 until 2004. The second Adventure was constructed in 2008 by Rockport Marine in Maine and sailed to Charles Towne Landing in October, 2008.

=== Fortified area ===
The Fortified Area of the site is bounded by a reconstructed palisade wall. Colonists constructed the original palisade wall to defend the young colony from a land-side attack from the Spanish. The Fortified Area also contains reconstructed earthwork fortifications and six replica cannon. The colonists mounted a battery of cannon facing the Ashley River, and a second battery defended Towne Creek (present day Old Towne Creek). Both the palisade wall and earthwork fortifications are both partially reconstructed on their archeological footprint.

=== Animal forest ===
The Animal Forest, a natural habitat zoo, is home to species indigenous to Carolina in the 1670s. Some of these animals, such as puma and bison, are no longer native to the South Carolina Low Country. Animals at the zoo include:

==== Birds ====
- Great blue heron (Ardea herodias)
- Brown pelican (Pelecanus occidentalis)
- Great egret (Casmerodius albus)
- Black-crowned night heron (Nycticorax nycticorax)
- White ibis (Eudocimus albus)
- Wild turkey (Maleagris gallopavo)
- Turkey vulture (Cathartes aura)
- Black vulture (Coragyps atratus)
- Yellow-crowned night heron (Nyctanassa violacea)

==== Mammals ====
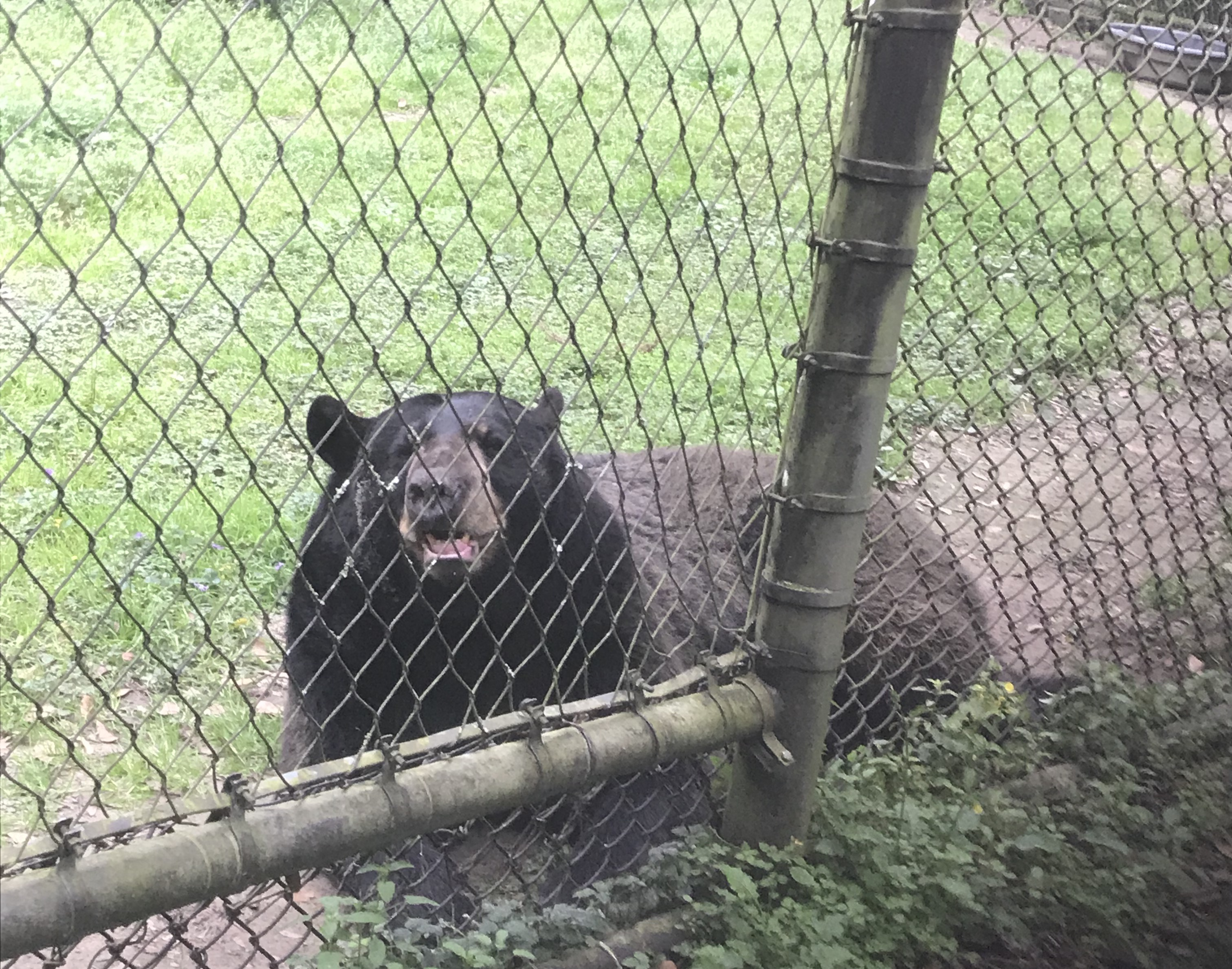
Black bear at the Charles Towne Landing's animal forest, March 2019

- Red wolf (Canis rufus)
- Striped skunk (Mephitis mephitis)
- Black bear (Ursus americanus)
- White-tailed deer (Odocoileus virginianus)
- Bison (Bison bison)
- Bobcat (Felis rufus)
- Pumas/cougars/mountain lions (Felis concolor)
- North American river otter (Lutra canadensis)

=== Archaeology ===
Archaeological finds include Native American, English, and African artifacts. Professional archeology at the site began in 1967, and continues through the present day.
