= Citadel Mall =

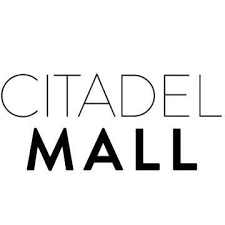

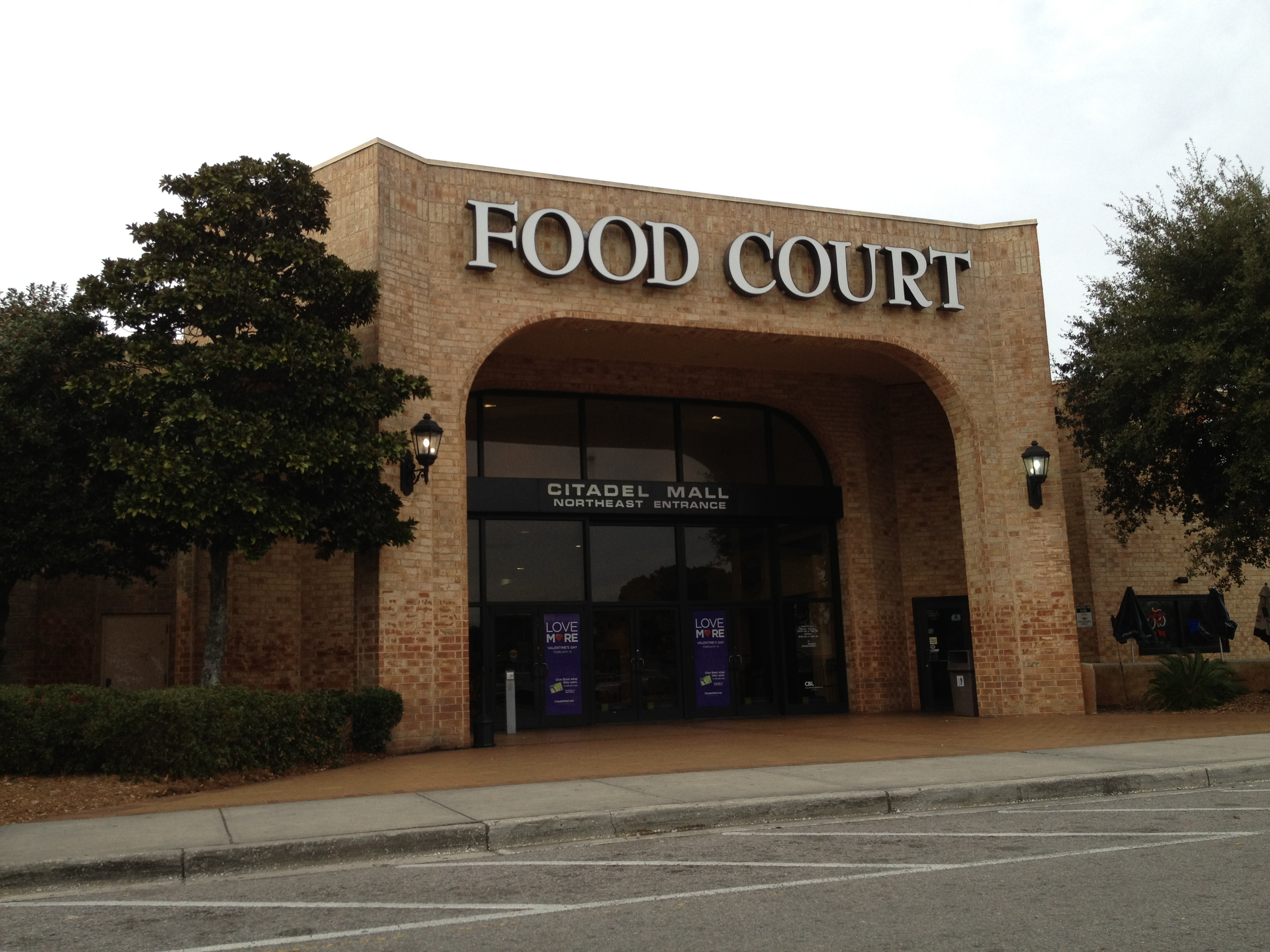
- Citadel Mall food court entrance, January 2012
- Location: West Ashley-Charleston, South Carolina, U.S.
- Coordinates: 32°47′53″N 80°1′55″W
- Address: 2070 Sam Rittenberg Boulevard
- Opened: July 29, 1981 renovated 2000
- Developer: Jacobs, Visconsi & Jacobs
- Manager: JLL Properties
- Owner: Medical University Hospital Authority
- Num. of stores: 100+
- Num. of anchor tenants: 5
- Floor area: 1,138,527 square feet (105,773 m^{2})
- Floors: 1 (2 in Belk, Dillard's, and MUSC)
- Parking: 5427
- Website: citadelmall.net

Citadel Mall is a regional 1,138,527 square feet (105,773 m^{2}) shopping mall located in Charleston, South Carolina, United States. It opened on July 29, 1981 and is located at the intersection of Sam Rittenberg Boulevard (SC Hwy. 7) and I-526. On September 1, 2013 the mall went into foreclosure after then owner CBL & Associates Properties defaulted on mortgage payments, and it was purchased at auction by the lender in January 2014. After the auction, the mall was placed under the ownership of a holding company formed by the lender, 2070 Sam Rittenberg Boulevard Holdings LLC and as of January 2017 was under contract to be sold to an undisclosed buyer. The anchor stores are Target, Belk, Dillard's, Dick's Sporting Goods, Medical University of South Carolina and junior anchor PetSmart.

== History ==
The mall opened in 1981 as a project of National Mall developer Jacobs, Visconsi & Jacobs of Cleveland, Ohio. Citadel Mall is located at the intersection of Sam Rittenberg Boulevard (S.C. Highway 7) and Savannah Highway (U.S. Highway 17) at the junction of Interstate 526 in the heavily commercialized West Ashley suburb of Charleston, South Carolina.

At the time of its opening, Citadel Mall was anchored by Sears which relocated from a free-standing location in Downtown Charleston at Calhoun and St. Philip Streets. Belk, which shuttered a 1950s store in Pinehaven Shopping Center in North Charleston relocated to the mall, and Thalhimer's, an upscale Richmond, Virginia-based department store chain new to South Carolina owned by Carter Hawley Hale Stores.

Jacobs, Visconsi and Jacobs later became The Richard E. Jacobs Group in the 1990s. The first major change at the mall occurred in 1992 when it was announced that Thalhimer's, now owned by the May Department Store Company, would be folded into the Hecht's Department Store chain and the Charleston location would be sold to Dillard's. Dillard's operated in the space for two years before moving to a newly constructed larger building at the mall in 1994. Dillard's sold the former Thalhimer's building to JCPenney, which remodeled the space and operated there until 2001 when it was sold to Target and torn down, replaced by a newly constructed one-story building for Target.

Belk relocated its original mall store into a newly constructed larger two-story building next to Dillard's, selling its old building to Parisian in 2000. When Belk bought the Parisian chain in 2006 from Saks Incorporated and folded the Parisian chain into Belk, the Parisian store at Citadel Mall was closed since Belk already operated a location at the mall. The building was sold to JCPenney, who returned to the mall in 2007.

The Richard E. Jacobs Group added a Food Court and completely remodeled the mall's interior in the early 2000s. Shortly thereafter, Jacobs divested the majority of its mall portfolio and sold Citadel Mall to CBL & Associates Properties. CBL added a sixth anchor store to the mix in 2005 - Dick's Sporting Goods on an outparcel next to the mall's freestanding six screen AMC Theatres.

On April 8, 2008, AMC Theatres announced that it was closing its Citadel Mall Cinema 6 after the final showing on Saturday, June 28, 2008. AMC also announced plans to close its Northwoods Mall Cinema 8 on the same date. The last film shown was WALL-E.

The cinema was originally built as a part of the General Cinemas chain which later was sold to AMC Theatres. General Cinemas had announced plans to demolish and replace the Citadel Mall Cinema 6 with a huge new multiplex featuring stadium seating and Dolby surround sound to be built on a vacant parcel of land behind the existing cinemas. With the sale to AMC, these plans never materialized. On April 12, 2008 it was announced that the property was acquired by Southeast Cinema Entertainment of Charlotte, North Carolina. It was reopened temporarily until September 2008 when the current cinema building was demolished. It was replaced by a state-of-the-art sixteen screen megaplex known as Citadel Mall IMAX Stadium 16 with several screens dedicated to art films and featuring stadium-style seating. The new IMAX megaplex opened October 2, 2009.

The mall was prominently featured in an episode of The Food Network's popular program "Food Court Wars" hosted by famed chef Tyler Florence that was taped at the mall in June 2013. The show pitted two couples against one another for the chance to win a lease of a vacant food court space at the mall for a year.

On September 10, 2013 The Post & Courier reported that US Bank National Association filed foreclosure proceedings against Citadel Mall's owners Citadel Mall CMBS LLC, a subsidiary of CBL & Associates Properties in Charleston County Court and had plunged the mall into receivership. Spinoso Real Estate Group of North Syracuse, New York was retained to manage the mall by the court appointed receiver and continued managing the mall for the holding company that purchased the mall at auction.

Spinoso Real Estate Group aggressively marketed the mall and successfully attracted new tenants during the period in which the mall was under bank ownership. Citadel Mall is seen as a highly attractive property due to its central location and visibility at the convergence of two major highways and an interstate and the fact that it has six successful anchor tenants and a new state-of-the-art IMAX cinema complex.

It was announced on February 24, 2017 that the mall was purchased for $17 million by TMP SRE 1, LLC, a limited-liability company of local business persons led by managing partner Richard C. Davis who is noted for developing and starring in the first season of A&E's "Flip This House" reality television series. The new owners have indicated that they intend to upgrade the mall's tenant mix to better suit the area while also adding entertainment and mixed-use elements including the construction of a multi-story travel sports facility attached to the mall. Former management company Spinoso Real Estate Group has been replaced by the new ownership and the property is now managed by JLL - Jones Lang LaSalle.

On March 17, 2017, JCPenney announced that its store would be closing as part of a plan to close 138 stores nationwide. The store closed on July 31, 2017. The JCPenney building was purchased by a subsidiary of the mall's new owners for $5.2 million and has been leased to the Medical University of South Carolina for a 20-year lease. It will undergo a $32.9 million renovation and conversion into a MUSC outpatient medical facility to include a musculoskeletal service line, ambulatory surgery center, imaging, patient services and support.

On May 3, 2018, Sears announced that it would also be closing in August 2018 as part of a plan to close 42 stores nationwide. Within days of the news of the closure, it was subsequently announced that the mall's owners had acquired the Sears property for $7.55 million. They stated that the acquisition of the Sears parcel was the final piece of a three-step process to transform the mall "into something more grand and consistent with the West Ashley revitalization plan." As a part of the planned upgrades and renovations Citadel Mall was also to be renamed EPIC Center.

From 2019 to 2025, HBO leased the 132,000-square-foot Sears store for principal photography for its television series The Righteous Gemstones. The show used the space as a new satellite location of the fictional Gemstone Family Ministries megachurch and openly referenced its status as a disused Sears. Since the series ended with the 2025 season, the former Sears space remains vacant.

On January 6, 2023 it was reported that the mall was acquired by real estate investors Singerman Real Estate of Chicago, Illinois for an undisclosed sum. Future plans have not as yet been announced, although the new owners removed all references to the “Epic Center” name throughout the mall. The name was formerly found on temporary walls covering vacant storefronts. All Epic Center signage has since been covered over with other graphics.

It was announced on December 20, 2025 that MUSC Health's West Ashley Medical Pavilion building (former JCPenney/Parisian/original Belk) which had been previously leased, along with the vacant Sears building and the entire mall inline space and concourses had been acquired by Medical University Hospital Authority from owner Singerman Real Estate LLC for $83.5 million. The purchase includes five separate parcels totaling 550,000 square feet over 53 acres and 2,000 parking spaces. Belk, Dillard's, Target, Citadel Mall Stadium 16 Cinemas, Dick's Sporting Goods and PetSmart will all retain their store locations and surrounding property and parking areas as these are privately owned by each business. MUSC Health has also announced that the existing inline mall tenants will remain and it will be continued to be utilized for retail spaces for the near term. The retail portion of the center will remain named Citadel Mall, with the medical portion being named West Ashley Medical Pavilion.

A press release issued by MUSC Health stated that the purchase would enable MUSC to expand research facilities, enhance educational programs and improve clinical care delivery, while also addressing critical parking challenges on the downtown Charleston campus. MUSC will begin setting up fencing and transportation schedules for employee parking in early 2026. Long-term plans may include repurposing existing structures into clinical space and adding modular facilities to support MUSC’s new comprehensive cancer hospital and medical office building. MUSC also purchased the former Red Lobster outparcel on Sam Rittenberg Blvd at the mall's main entrance road last year with plans to demolish the shuttered restaurant and construct a stand-alone emergency room.
