= Middleton High School (South Carolina) =

Location
- 1776 William Kennerty Dr. Charleston, South Carolina; United States

Information
- Former name: St. Andrews Junior High School
- School type: Public, high school
- Established: 1 September 1970
- Status: Closed
- Closed: 1 June 2000
- School district: Charleston County School District
- Principal: Rufus German
- Grades: 9–12
- Gender: Coeducational
- Campus: West Ashley High School
- Campus type: Suburban
- Athletics: South Carolina High School League (SCHSL)
- Athletics conference: 4-AAAA
- Sports: Football, Basketball, Soccer, Track and Field, Baseball
- Nickname: Razorbacks

Middleton High School was a high school in South Carolina. It is now closed.

== History ==
The school closed as it gave way to a more modern high school West Ashley High School. The former school was located West of the Ashley in Charleston, S.C. at 1776 William Kennerty Dr. just off SC Hwy 61. The school opened in 1970 and closed its doors as a high school in 2000. Mr. Rufus German was Middleton's principal. He spent many years trying to make Middleton a bigger and better school. The structure of the Middleton High School building was that of St. Andrews Junior High School. When the student body split in 1970 between Middleton and St. Andrews, Middleton students were going back in time to their junior high school years. When the split was announced in 1970, students that were zoned for Middleton were concerned, as all had expected to move on to St. Andrews High School. In the spring of 1970, Mr. John Kicklighter, a coach who became the principal of the new school, held a meeting for the new students. In this meeting, Mr. Kicklighter stated his intention to make Middleton a superlative high school, and one worthy of respect. It was he that first mentioned the idea of using a Razorback as a school mascot. When the school year began in the fall of 1970, Middleton and St. Andrews shared a football team. By that winter, Middleton fielded their own basketball team.

== Sports ==
Middleton won the South Carolina 4-AAAA state basketball championship in 1972, 1974, and 1977 and lower state titles in 1973 and 1978; the school achieved numerous region titles. The Razorbacks were led by Head Coach Jerry Waters, one of the winningest basketball coaches in South Carolina. During his tenure at Middleton High School from 1970-1978, coach Waters accrued more than 100 victories, including 54 consecutive wins, a South Carolina 4A record, and a perfect 28-0 season.

The football program began its quest for a championship in 1971. The Razorbacks were led by head coaches Dan Coury in 1971, Emerson Wiles in 1972-73 and Jim Werden for the next 26 years from 1974 to 2000. The Razorbacks won the state championship in 1982. That year they defeated the Summerville Greenwave during the season. The Greenwaves went on to win the Division 1 State Championship therefore the "Real" State Champions were the Middleton Razorbacks. They were lower state champions in 1985. The Razorbacks won region titles in 1982, 1987, and 1999. The Razorbacks finished with a 193–131 record through the years.

1970s - 53 wins, 43 losses 1980s - 78 wins, 38 losses 1990s - 62 wins, 50 losses

The Middleton soccer program was the best in the state through the 1980s and 1990s. Middleton fielded its first soccer team in 1980, under the direction of Coach Ted Miller. The team finished with a 0-13 record in their first year but never had a losing season for the next 19 years. Building on the success of year two, in which the Razorbacks finished with a 10-4-1 record, Coach Miller built a soccer powerhouse throughout the 1980sz and 1990s. The soccer program closed its doors in 2000 with a lower state championship and a state runner-up championship prior to opening West Ashley High School. The School won three state championships (1985, 1986, and 1988), six lower state championships (1987, 1989, 1993, 1994, 1996, and 2000), and twelve region titles (1981, 1986–1989, 1992–1996, and 2000).

It also led the state in other sports like track and field, baseball, and soccer.

== Reputation ==
Between 1984 and 1990, the faculty, staff and parents created a synergy and excellence in academics, sports, and the arts. It was more the rule than the exception that the star athletes were also featured in the vocal programs. In 1986 the Middleton singers directed by Robin Rogers and Page Kelly represented SC in a national vocal competition in California. They were placed second, with their lead soloist Leland Simmons winning the top soloist in the nation.

Charleston parents began removing their children from area private schools (Porter Gaud, Ashley Hall, Bishop England) and enrolling them in Middleton.

All of the former Middleton High School alumni can be found on the alumni site.

== Noteworthy Graduates ==
- Darius Rucker, country music singer and lead singer of the pop band, Hootie and the Blowfish.
- Eric Bass, lead bass for heavy metal group Shinedown
- Bobby Harrell, former Speaker of the South Carolina House of Representatives.
