= Kuhn's-Big K =

American discount store chain

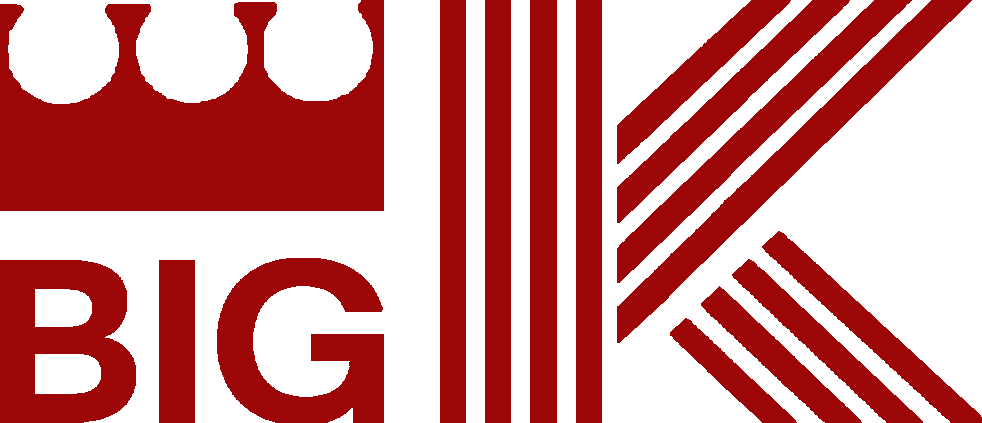
- Founded: 1913 (as Kuhn Brothers); 1962 (as Big K)
- Defunct: 1981
- Fate: Merged with Walmart
- Successor: Walmart
- Headquarters: Columbia, Tennessee
- Number of locations: 18 (1969); 21 (1970); 105 (1977)
- Subsidiaries: Big K-Edward's

Kuhn's-Big K, (typically signed as simply Big K) was a large discount store chain in the Southeastern United States that merged with Walmart in 1981.

== History ==
Kuhn's-Big K began in 1913, as a chain of variety stores called Kuhn Brothers, founded in Columbia, Tennessee. The first Kuhn's-Big K was opened in 1962, and by 1969 operated 35 variety stores and 18 Big K discount department stores. That same year, the company was officially renamed to Kuhn's - Big K Stores Corporation. In March 1970, the company announced plans to go public with 400,000 shares, then operating 21 Big K stores and 34 Kuhn's Variety Stores. The company later went public in April 1971, with 512,000 shares of common stock.

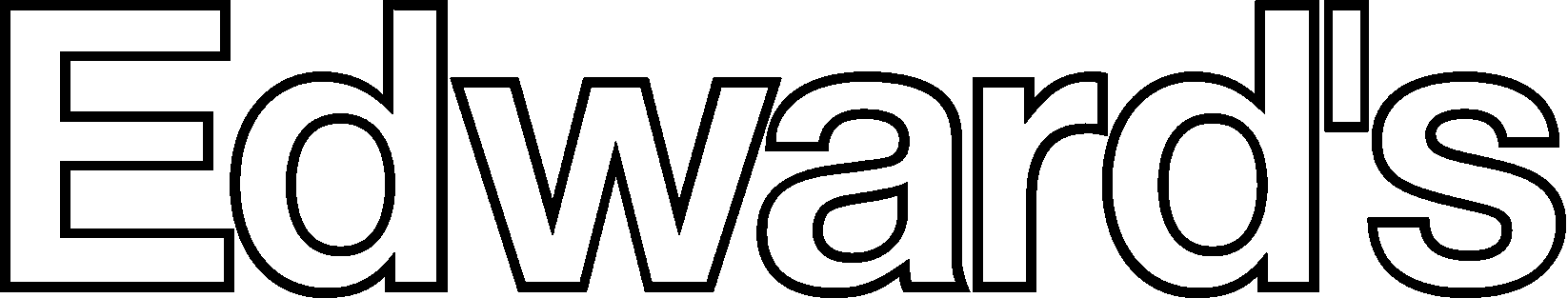
Edward's was purchased in 1977 with stores changing to the Big K-Edwards name

Kuhn's Big K began an expansion push in the early 1970s, and by August 1971 had a total of 17 stores in varying stages of development. The company at this time began to open larger and larger stores, the biggest at the time being a planned 76,000 sq ft location in Nashville, Tennessee. The company had a total of 30 Big K stores and 32 Kuhn's Variety Stores, when they bought out the lease of a Sky City store in Greeneville, Tennessee in January 1972. Big K expanded into South Carolina with the purchase of competing discount chain Edward's in September 1977, adding 33 stores, operated as subsidiary Big K-Edwards, to the then 105 stores.

In June 1981, Kuhn's-Big K, then described as "financially struggling" by The New York Times, agreed to a merger with competitor Walmart in a deal valued at $13 million. The merger followed another attempted merger with Walmart in 1980, which collapsed due to store lease complications.
