= Sears (surname) =

Sears is a surname. People with the name include:

- Andrew Sears, American computer scientist
- Eleonora Sears (1881–1968), American national tennis champion
- Ernest Robert Sears (1910–1991), American plant geneticist
- Francis Sears (1898–1975), American physicist
- Fred F. Sears (1913–1957), American film actor and director
- Freddie Sears (b. 1989), English professional footballer
- James T. Sears (born 1951), American historian
- JP Sears, a life coach and internet comedian
- JP Sears (baseball) (born 1996), American baseball player
- Leslie Sears (1901–1992), English cricketer
- Mark Sears (born 2002), American basketball player
- Mary Sears (disambiguation), multiple people
- Michael M. Sears (born 1947), American executive
- Minnie Earl Sears (1873–1933), American librarian, cataloguer, and bibliographer who formulated the Sears Subject Headings
- Richard Sears (disambiguation), multiple people
  - Richard Warren Sears (1863–1914), American manager, businessman, and co-founder of Sears, Roebuck and Company
- Robert Sears (disambiguation), multiple people
- Simon Sears (b. 1984), Danish actor
- Teddy Sears (b. 1977), American actor
- Varley F. Sears (1937–2019), Canadian physicist
- William Sears (disambiguation), multiple people
- Winsome Sears (b. 1964), American politician

== See also ==
- Sear
