= Se =

SE, Se, or Sé may refer to:

== Initialisms ==
- Standard Edition (e.g. Java Platform, Standard Edition)
- Special Edition
- Second Edition (e.g. Windows 98 Second Edition)

== Arts and entertainment ==
- Sé (album), by Lúnasa, 2006
- Se (instrument), a traditional Chinese musical instrument

== Businesses and organizations ==
- Societas Europaea, a form of legal entity registered under European Union law
- Sea Ltd (NYSE: SE), tech conglomerate headquartered in Singapore
- Slovenské elektrárne, electric utility company in Slovakia
- XL Airways France, IATA airline designator SE
- Southeastern (train operating company), or SE Trains Limited, in England

== Places ==
- Sè, Atlantique, Benin
- Sè, Mono, Benin
- Subprefecture of Sé, São Paulo, Brazil
  - Sé (district of São Paulo)
  - Sé (São Paulo Metro), a station
- Sé, Hungary
- Sé, Macau
- Sé (Angra do Heroísmo), Terceira, Azores, Portugal
- Sé (Braga), Portugal
- Sé (Bragança), Faro, Portugal
- Sé (Funchal), Madeira, Portugal
- Sé, Lamego, Portugal
- Sé (Lisbon), Portugal
- Sé, Portalegre, Portugal
- Sé (Porto), Portugal
- SE postcode area, London, England
- Sergipe (SE), a state of Brazil
- Sweden, ISO country code SE

== Language ==
- Se (kana) (せ and セ), a Japanese kana
- Northern Sami language, ISO 639-1 code se
- Standard English, in linguistics
- Se (letter) (Ս,ս) an Armenian letter

== Science and technology ==
- Se (unit of measurement), a Japanese unit of area
- .se, Internet country code top-level domain for Sweden
- Se, a text editor
- Selenium, symbol Se, a chemical element
- Special Euclidean group
- Standard error, of a statistic
- Status epilepticus, a medical state of persistent seizure
- Synthetic environment, a computer simulation
- Sony Ericsson, a former name of Sony Mobile
- iPhone SE, a series of budget smartphones by Apple
- Macintosh SE, an Apple personal computer

== Other uses ==
- Southeast (direction)
- S. E. (name), initials used by several people
- Lisbon Cathedral, or simply the Sé, Portugal
- Sé da Guarda, Portugal
- Split end, a type of wide receiver in American football
- Somatic experiencing, a method of alternative therapy
- Asüna SE, a compact car marketed in Canada
- Secondary School Entrance Examination, a standardized examination from 1962 to 1977
- Sweden (aircraft registration prefix SE)

== See also ==
- Single-ended (disambiguation)
- Windows 11 SE, a computer operating system
