= Seer =

A seer is a person who practices divination.

Seer(s) or SEER may also refer to:

== Arts and entertainment ==
- Seer (band), an Austrian music band
- Seer (game series), a Chinese video game and animated series
  - Seer (film), 2011, based on the video game
- Seer, a playable character in the game Apex Legends

== Businesses and organizations ==
- Seer, Inc., an American proteomics company

== People ==
- Seer of Lublin (Yaakov Yitzchak HaLevi Horowitz, 1745–1815), Polish rebbe
- Dudley Seers (1920–1983), British economist
- Graham Seers (born 1958), Australian cyclist
- Lindsay Seers (born 1966), British artist
- Matt Seers (born 1974), Australian rugby league player

== Other uses ==
- Seer (unit), a traditional Asian unit of mass and volume
- Seer fish (or Spanish mackerel), a subfamily of the Scombridae mackerel fish
- USS Seer (AM-112), an American warship
- Prophet, seer, and revelator, a title in the Latter Day Saint movement

== SEER ==
- Scottish Executive Emergency Room (SEER), renamed Scottish Government Resilience Room
- Seasonal energy efficiency ratio (SEER), measuring the efficiency of air conditioners
- Surveillance, Epidemiology, and End Results (SEER), a program of the U.S. National Cancer Institute

== See also ==
- Sear (disambiguation)
- Sears (disambiguation)
- Seir (disambiguation)
- Sere (disambiguation)
- The Seer (disambiguation)
- Oracle
- Khirbet Sir, a Palestinian village on the West Bank
