= Ser =

Ser or SER may refer to:

== Places ==
- Ser, a village in Bogdand Commune, Satu Mare County, Romania
- Serpens (Ser), an astronomical constellation of the northern hemisphere
- Serres, known as Ser in Serbian, a city in Macedonia, Greece

== Organizations ==
- Social-Economic Council (Sociaal-Economische Raad, SER) of the Dutch government
- Society for Ecological Restoration (SER)
- Society for Epidemiologic Research, North America

== Science and technology ==
- Ser (unit), an obsolete unit of volume in India
- Sequence of events recorder
- Serine (Ser), an ɑ-amino acid in biochemistry
- Single-ended recuperative burner, a type of gas burner
- SIP Express Router
- Smooth endoplasmic reticulum, in cell biology
- Soft error rate, in computing
- Ser., taxonomic author abbreviation of Nicolas Charles Seringe (1776–1858), French physician and botanist

== Transport ==
- SER, IATA code for Freeman Municipal Airport, Seymour, Indiana, U.S.
- SER, MRT station abbreviation for Serangoon MRT station, Singapore
- SER, National Rail code for St Erth railway station in Cornwall, UK
- South Eastern Railway (England), UK
- South Eastern Railway zone, India

== Other uses ==
- SER (magazine), Nicaragua
- ser, ISO 639-3 language code for Serrano language
- Cadena SER (SER network), a Spanish radio network
- Darren Cullen (graffiti artist), a graffiti artist known by the tag name SER
- Hedva Ser, French artist

== See also ==
- Serr
- Sir (disambiguation)
