= Otherspace =

Otherspace may refer to:

- Otherspace (novel), the third novel in David Stahler Jr.'s Truesight trilogy
- OtherSpace, an online text-based role-playing game created by Wes Platt
- Otherspace, or Todash space, a dimensionless void that is featured in the Stephen King works The Dark Tower and The Mist
- Other Space, a 2015 web series
