= La Serre (disambiguation) =

La Serre might refer to:

- Jean Puget de la Serre (1594-1665), writer and dramatist
- Jean-Louis-Ignace de La Serre (1662-1757), writer and dramatist
- Charles Barbier de la Serre (1767-1841), cryptographer
- La Serre, commune in the department of Aveyron, France
- La Serre-Bussière-Vieille, commune in the department of Creuse, France
- La Serre, pen name of Simon-Joseph Pellegrin

== See also ==
- Lasserre (disambiguation)
- Serre (disambiguation)
