= The Seer =

The Seer may refer to:

== Film and television ==
- The Seer (film), a 2007 Italian thriller and horror film
- "The Seer" (Sliders), an episode of the TV series
- "The Seer" (Stargate Atlantis), an episode of the TV series
- "The Seer", an episode of the cartoon Challenge of the GoBots

== Literature ==
- The Seer (novel), by David Stahler Jr.
- The Seer (novel series), by Linda Joy Singleton
- The Seer (periodical), a Latter Day Saint periodical 1853–1854
- The Seer, a 2016 novel in The Seer Saga series by Sonia Orin Lyris

== Music ==
- The Seer (Big Country album), 1986
- The Seer (Swans album), 2012
- The Seer (EP), by Tarja, 2008
- The Seers, a British rock group

== See also ==
- Seer (disambiguation)
