= Serre =

Serre may refer to:

- Serre (surname)
- Serre (grape), a red Italian wine grape
- Serre (river), a tributary of the Oise in France
- Serre, Campania, a town and comune in Salerno, Campania, Italy
- Serre-lès-Puisieux, a village in Pas-de-Calais department, northern France
- Serre Chevalier, a French ski resort in the Alps
- Serre Calabresi, a mountain and hill area of Calabria, Italy

== See also ==
- Serr, a surname
- Serres (disambiguation)
- La Serre (disambiguation)
