= Sere =

Sere or SERE may refer to:

== Military ==
- Survival, Evasion, Resistance and Escape, an American military training program
- Survive, Evade, Resist, Extract, a British military training program

== People ==
- Sere (name)
- Sere people, an ethnic group in Southern Sudan

== Places ==
- Serè, Liege, Belgium
- Sère, Gers department, France
- Sere, Mali, a rural commune in the Tombouctou region of Mali

== Other uses ==
- Ṣērê, a Hebrew niqqud vowel sign
- "Seré", a song by Chilean musician Nicole Natalino
- Sere (ecology), an ecological stage or event, one such event in a series
- Sere languages, a proposed family of Ubangian languages
  - Sere language, spoken in northeastern Democratic Republic of the Congo
- "SERE", an episode of The Unit (season 1)

== See also ==
- Sear (disambiguation)
- Seer (disambiguation)
- Seir (disambiguation)
- Serr, a surname
