= Trivial school =

Historical type of school in Sweden

Trivial schools (Swedish: trivialskolan, Finnish: triviaalikoulu; from Latin trivium) were schools in Sweden and its integrated part Finland from the early 17th century, in Sweden to 1905.

Trivial schools were the second grade of education in the 1649 school reform of Queen Christina. First grade was Pedagogium, followed by Trivial school and Gymnasium. Education in Trivial schools was given in three subjects; grammar including Latin and Greek, rhetoric and dialectic. The school lasted for eight years, having four two-year classes. They were disbanded in Grand Duchy of Finland by the 1843 school reform and in Sweden in 1905.

== Trivial schools in Sweden ==
- Eksjö
- Falun
- Frösön
- Gothenburg
- Gävle
- Hudiksvall
- Härnosand
- Jönköping
- Kalmar
- Karlshamn
- Katedralskolan, Uppsala
- Klara skola, Stockholm
- Kristianstad
- Kungälv
- Linköping
- Maria trivialskola, Stockholm
- Nicolai skola, Stockholm
- Nyköping
- Piteå
- Skara
- Skänninge
- Strängnäs
- Sundsvall
- Söderköping
- Umeå
- Visby
- Visingsö
- Västervik
- Västerås
- Växjö
- Ystad
- Örebro

== Trivial schools in Finland ==
- Helsinki
- Hämeenlinna
- Kuopio
- Oulu
- Pori
- Rauma
- Turku
- Vaasa
- Vyborg
