= Torsten Pettersson =

Finnish-Swedish author, poet and professor

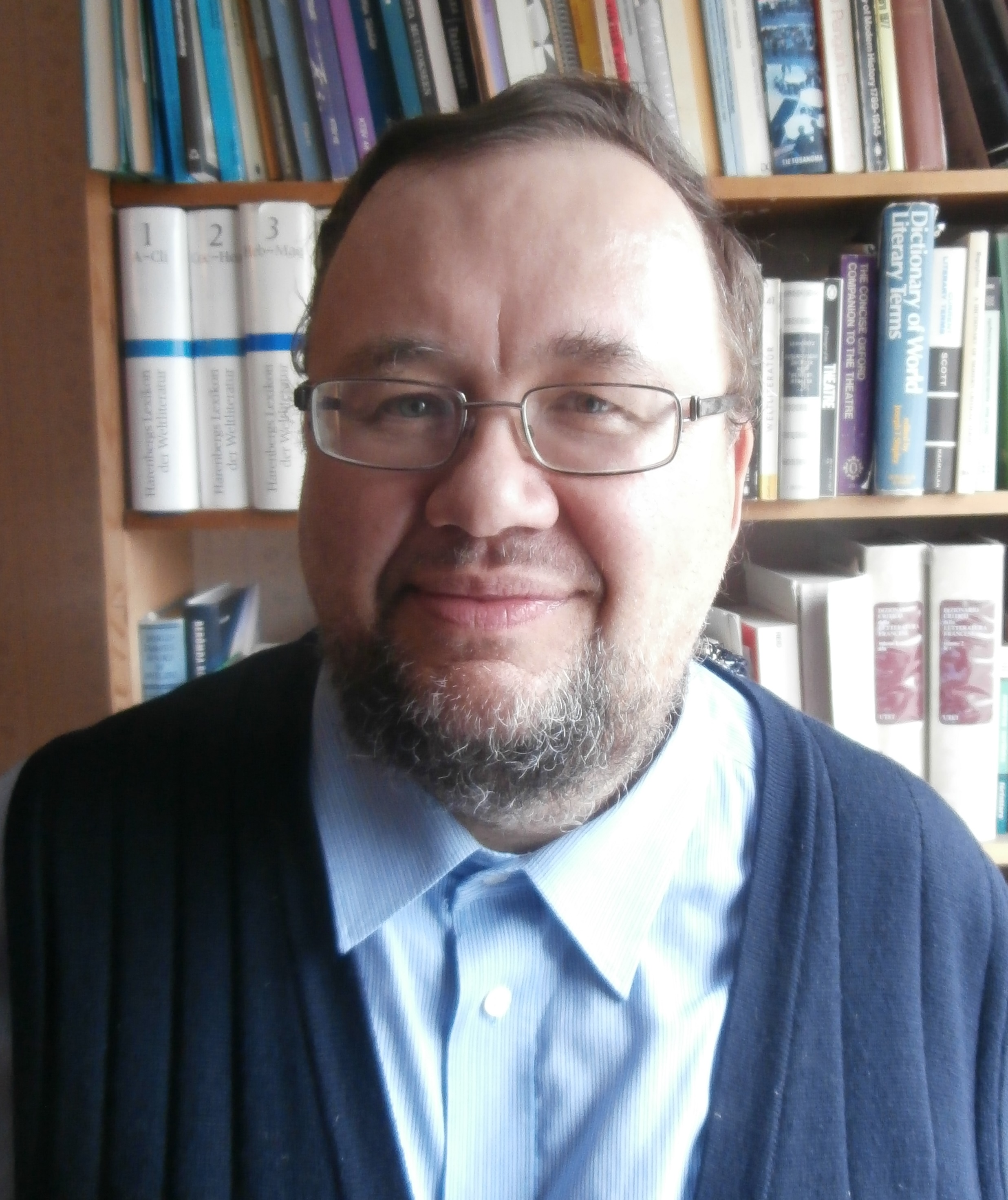
Torsten Pettersson in 2015

Torsten Pettersson (born 9 July 1955) is a Finnish-Swedish author, poet and professor.

Born in Turku, Finland, Pettersson lives in Uppsala, Sweden where he works as a professor of literature at Uppsala University. In 1982, he graduated from Åbo Akademi University with a work about Joseph Conrad. He has also been professor in literature and aesthetics at University of Helsinki and in 1994 he started working as professor in Uppsala full time.

== Bibliography ==
- 1982 – Consciousness and time – a study in the philosophy and narrative technique of Joseph Conrad (ISBN 951-648-809-9)
- 1983 – Åbo akademi forskar Pågående projekt 1983. Red. Torsten Pettersson (ISBN 951-648-962-1)
- 1985 – Besvärjelse (ISBN 951-52-1028-3)
- 1986 – Att söka sanningen : en grundprincip i Eyvind Johnsons författarskap (ISBN 951-649-248-7)
- 1987 – Ser du dem inte? (ISBN 951-52-1112-3)
- 1989 – Solen är en tunnel (ISBN 951-52-1263-4)
- 1991 – Vargskallen och andra berättelser (ISBN 951-52-1362-2)
- 1994 – Livets namn är alltid (ISBN 951-52-1502-1)
- 1999 – Det finns inget annat (ISBN 951-52-1766-0)
- 1999 – Litteratur och verklighetsförståelse – idémässiga aspekter av 1900-talets litteratur. Redaktörer: Anders Pettersson, Torsten Pettersson och Anders Tyrberg (ISBN 91-7191-719-5)
- 2000 – Tid och evighet – nedslag i det gångna årtusendets europeiska litteratur. Red. av Stefan Mählqvist och Torsten Pettersson (ISBN 91-88300-41-2)
- 2001 – Gåtans namn – tankens och känslans mönster hos nio finlandssvenska modernister (ISBN 91-7486-543-9, Atlantis)
- 2001 – Modernitetens ansikten – livsåskådningar i nordisk 1900-talslitteratur. Red.: Carl Reinhold Bråkenhielm och Torsten Pettersson (ISBN 91-578-0362-5)
- 2002 – Dolda principer : kultur- och litteraturteoretiska studier (ISBN 91-44-04170-5)
- 2002 – Varje dag (ISBN 951-52-2034-3)
- 2003 – Att fånga världen i ord – litteratur och livsåskådning – teoretiska perspektiv. Redaktörer: Carl Reinhold Bråkenhielm och Torsten Pettersson (ISBN 91-7217-058-1)
- 2004 – Det mesta som finns är osynligt (ISBN 91-506-1768-0)
- 2005 – Mörkret, det börjar, glansen, den varar – en diktsvit (ISBN 951-52-2241-9, Söderström)
- 2006 – Operavärldar från Monteverdi till Gershwin – tjugo uppsatser redigerade av Torsten Pettersson (ISBN 91-7353-116-2)
- 2007 – Att tolka det tomma – om figurativt inriktade tolkningar av det nonfigurativa i bildkonst, litteratur och musik – Konstverk och konstverkan (ISBN 978-91-7139-688-4; S. [9]–31)
- 2007 – Jag ser en stjärna – ett diktat porträtt av Carl von Linné (ISBN 978-91-89352-31-5, Edition Edda)
- 2008 – Ge mig dina ögon (ISBN 9789515225733, Söderströms)
- 2010 – Göm mig i ditt hjärta (ISBN 9789515227409, Söderströms)
- 2013 – Hitlers fiender : Berlin oktober 1938–januari 1939 (ISBN 9789185379712)
