= Darren Cullen =

Darren Cullen may refer to:

- Darren Cullen (activist), British artist and political cartoonist
- Darren Cullen (graffiti artist), British graffiti artist
