= Nils Storå =

Nils Eugen Storå (29 May 1933 – 22 March 2023) was a Finnish ethnologist.

He was born in Jakobstad. He was employed at Åbo Akademi University in 1959, and took his doctorate in 1968. From 1972 to 1997 he was a professor of Nordic ethnology, among others with an emphasis on skerry guard culture. He is a member of the Norwegian Academy of Science and Letters.

He married librarian Siv Storå in 1958. He died in March 2023.
