= Kaisa Sere =

Finnish computer scientist

- Born: 3 June 1954; Gamlakarleby
- Died: 5 December 2012 (aged 58)

Academic background
- Education: Åbo Akademi University

Academic work
- Discipline: Computer science
- Sub-discipline: Formal methods
- Institutions: Turku Center for Computer Science; Åbo Akademi University; Academy of Finland; University of Kuopio; Utrecht University; Ohio State University

Kaisa Sere (3 June 1954 – 5 December 2012) was a Finnish computer scientist, specialising in research into formal methods.

Kaisa Sere was born 3 June 1954 in Gamlakarleby. She received an MSc in mathematics in 1979 and a PhD in computer science in 1990, both from Åbo Akademi University in Turku, southern Finland. She undertook formal methods research in action systems, distributed systems, hardware design, neural networks, and program refinement. She undertook joint research with Ralph-Johan Back and was involved in many collaborative European research projects. She also supervised 19 PhD students.

During 1984–5, Sere was a lecturer at Ohio State University in the United States. During 1991–2, she was a post-doctoral researcher in the Department of Computer Science at the Utrecht University in the Netherlands. During 1993–8, she held an Associate Professorship at the Department of Computer Science and Applied Mathematics in the University of Kuopio in Finland. In 1997, she became a Docent of Computer Science in the same department in 1997. During 1998–9, she held a senior research professorship funded by the Academy of Finland. In 1998, she became a full professor of Computer Science and Engineering in the Department of Information Technology at Åbo Akademi University. She held a senior researcher position from the Academy of Finland during 2010–11. Sere was also affiliated with the Turku Center for Computer Science (TUCS) and a member of the Research Council for Natural Sciences and Engineering for the Academy of Finland.

== Publications ==
Sere's books included:

- Emil Sekerinski and Kaisa Sere, Program Development by Refinement: Case Studies Using the B Method. Springer-Verlag, Formal Approaches to Computing and Information Technology (FACIT), 1998. ISBN 978-1-85233-053-8.
- Michael Butler, Luigia Petre, and Kaisa Sere (editors), Integrated Formal Methods, Springer-Verlag, Lecture Notes in Computer Science, Volume 2335, 2002. ISBN 978-3-540-43703-1.
