= Sears (disambiguation) =

Sears may refer to:

== Department store chains ==
- Sears, Roebuck and Co., commonly known as Sears, a chain of department stores in the US
- Sears Mexico, a chain of department stores in Mexico
- Sears Canada, a chain of department stores in Canada
- Gala-Sears, a chain of department stores in Chile

== Related and unrelated businesses ==
- Sears Holdings, former parent of Sears and other companies
- Sears plc, a former British holdings company
- Sears Seating, also known as Sears Manufacturing, an American designer and manufacturer

== Buildings ==
- Sears Building, the name of several buildings
- Sears, Roebuck and Company Complex, in Chicago, Illinois, U.S.
- Sears Tower, the former name of the Willis Tower, in Chicago, Illinois, U.S.

== People ==
Sears (surname)

== Other uses ==
- Scotland's Environmental and Rural Services (SEARS), a partnership of environmental agencies
- USNS Mary Sears (T-AGS-65), a United States Navy oceanographic survey ship in commission since 2001
- Sears, Michigan, an unincorporated community

== See also ==
- Sear (disambiguation)
- Seares (disambiguation)
- Transform Holdco, the parent of Sears and other companies
