= Serr =

Serr is a surname. Notable people with this surname include:

- Jan Serr (born 1943), American visual artist
- Michael Serr (born 1962), German football player

== See also ==
- Ser (disambiguation)
- Sere (disambiguation)
- Serre (disambiguation)
