= Otherspace (novel) =

2008 novel by David Stahler Jr

- Author: David Stahler Jr.
- Cover artist: Steve Stone
- Language: English
- Series: Truesight Trilogy
- Genre: Young adult, Science fiction novel
- Publisher: Eos Books
- Publication date: 2008
- Publication place: United States
- Media type: Print (hardback & paperback)
- Pages: 342
- ISBN: 978-0-06-052291-9 (first edition, hardcover)
- OCLC: 166317460
- LC Class: PZ7.S782460 Lif. 2008
- Preceded by: The Seer

Otherspace is a 2008 young adult science fiction novel by American author David Stahler Jr. It is the third and final book in the Truesight trilogy, following Truesight and The Seer.

== Plot summary ==
The story begins with Xander and Jacob hunting gruskers, a strange plant-eating creature. Later, Jacob reveals that he wants to go to Teiresias in hopes of meeting the other escaped Seers. Delaney sells her eyes to buy his passage aboard the Odessa, commanded by Captain Bennet. Jacob becomes acquainted with the crew, but is wary of Folgrin, a businessman with strange eyes who seems suspicious. Aboard the ship, they go into Otherspace, a place encountered by entering a wormhole, and Jacob discovers that he is able to move during Otherspace, while others are rendered immobile.

When the ship crashes on Maker's Drift, a dark, neglected planet surrounded in superstition, only Bennet, Folgrin, and Jacob survive. After Jacob meets a strange couple, he and Bennet buy passage aboard a passenger liner to Teiresias, a strange planet where one half of the planet receives sunlight and the other is dark, cold, and barren. At Teiresias, Jacob eventually meets Avery, another Blinder who received vision. Jacob is taken to a base on the dark side of Teiresias where he meets the other Blinders who received sight and escaped.

== Reception ==
According to Kirkus Reviews, "Jacob’s unexplained near-magical powers don’t detract from the pleasantly unexpected conclusion of his character arc. While Jacob’s earlier adventures suffered from a heavy-handed connection between metaphorical and physical blindness, this final volume deftly avoids that weakness."
