= Serre (surname) =

Serre is a French surname. Notable people with the surname include:

- Chantal Serre
- Claude Serre (1938–1998), French cartoonist
- Henri Serre (1931–2023), French actor
- Jean-Pierre Serre (born 1926), French mathematician, husband of Josiane
- Josiane Serre (1922–2004), French chemist, wife of Jean-Pierre
- Louis Serre (disambiguation), multiple people
- Marine Serre (born 1991), French fashion designer
- Nathalie Serre (born 1968), French politician

== See also ==
- Benoît Serré (1951–2019), Canadian politician
- Josephus Serré (1907–1991), Dutch athlete
- Gaetan Serré (1938–2017), Canadian politician
- Marc Serré (born 1967), Canadian politician
