= Di Wei =

Chinese research fellow

- 魏迪
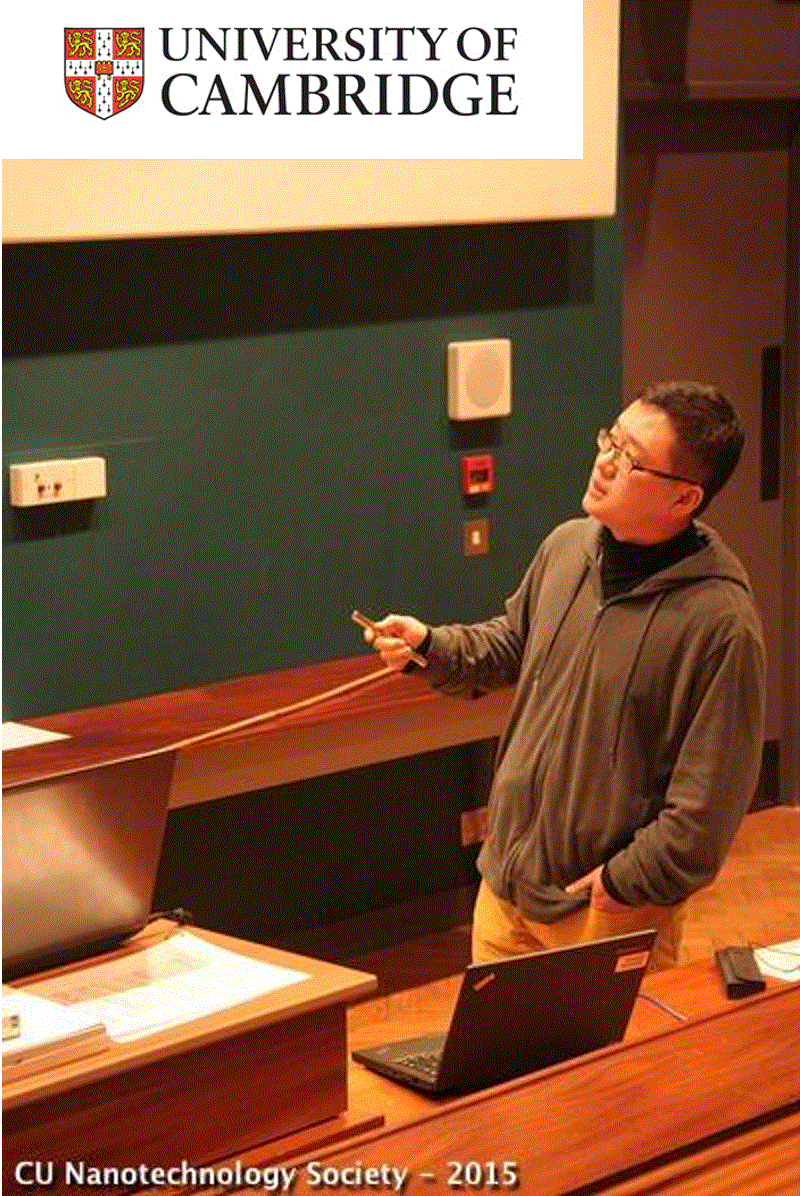
- Di Wei in Cambridge
- Education: Åbo Akademi University; University of Science and Technology of China
- Scientific career
- Fields: Nanotechnology
- Workplaces: Beijing Institute of Nanoenergy and Nanosystems
- Doctoral advisor: Ari Ivaska
- Website: http://www.iontronics.group/en/

Di Wei (Chinese: 魏迪) is an affiliated research fellow at the University of Cambridge and serves as principal investigator at Beijing Institute of Nanoenergy and Nanosystems (BINN) as head of the iontronics laboratory.

== Professional career ==
Wei obtained BSc degrees in applied chemistry from the University of Science and Technology of China in 2002, followed by MSc degrees in chemical engineering from Åbo Akademi University in 2003 and a PhD degree in chemical engineering from Åbo Akademi University in 2007. He was a Research Associate (Postdoc Fellow) in University of Cambridge from 2007 to 2008, during which time he worked in the laboratory of Gehan Amaratunga. Later, he worked as senior researcher at the Nokia Technologies, Cambridge from 2008 to 2010; and principal researcher in Nokia Technologies Cambridge/Bell Labs from 2010 to 2016 before starting his venture in China.

Wei is now principal investigator at BINN and leads the Iontronics Laboratory, focusing on iontronic devices, nanofluidics, and electrochemical energy systems. He is also affiliated with the University of Cambridge and is a Life Senior Member of Wolfson College. Currently, he is research fellow in the Center for Photonic Devices and Sensors (CPDS) at Cambridge University, Founder and Executive Director in Innoviva Ltd., Docent (adjunct professor) in engineering at Åbo Akademi University.

== Current research ==
Wei's group studies nanoconfined iontronics, using ions as charge carriers and precisely modulating the electrical double layer (EDL) in nanoscale channels and interfaces to control charge transport for energy, information processing, and probing interfacial reaction kinetics. Reported directions include 2D nanofluidic systems for selective, directional ion transport and fully printable, ultra-thin osmotic energy devices; triboiontronics, which employs triboelectric fields to dynamically tune EDL polarity and magnitude for self-powered, neuromimetic ionic logic and tele-perception; and contact-electro-chemistry at solid–liquid interfaces, where EDL-mediated electron transfer governs radical generation and enables chemiluminescence, polymerization, and redox reactions in aqueous and non-aqueous media.

Over the past two decades, Wei has developed a program on EDL regulation at nanoconfined charged interfaces, enabling control over ionic charge transport in energy conversion, neuromorphic computing, sensing, and probes for reaction kinetics. EDL is influencing processes in energy storage, catalysis, and sensor technology through its ability to modulate charge distribution and transport at interfaces.

== Awards and achievements ==
Wei is listed on about 200 international patent applications, including PCT, with more than 100 granted; several have been transferred to industry such as Nokia and Lyten alongside spin-off activities. He received the Brian Conway Prize in Physical Electrochemistry (ISE), the Nokia Global Innovation and Excellence Award (NIEA).

He has been elected as Life Fellow of the National Academy of Inventors (FNAI, USA), Fellow of Institute of Materials, Minerals & Mining (FIMMM, UK), Fellow of Royal Society of Chemistry (FRSC, UK), Member of the European Academy of Sciences and Arts (MEASA), and a Fellow of the European Academy of Sciences (FEurASc). Wei has also participated in UK–EU research collaborations (including Graphene Flagship–related activities) and supervised more than twenty graduate researchers.

His work on catalyzed transformative advances in iontronics has been recognized by the International Union of Pure and Applied Chemistry (IUPAC) as one of the Top 10 Emerging Technologies in Chemistry in 2024.

== Selected publications ==
- Du, Yan; Shen, Penghui; Liu, Houfang; Zhang, Yuyang; Jia, Luyao; Pu, Xiong; Yang, Feiyao; Ren, Tianling; Chu, Daping; Wang, Zhonglin; Wei, Di (2024-09-11). "Multi-receptor skin with highly sensitive tele-perception somatosensory". Science Advances. 10 (37) eadp8681. doi:10.1126/sciadv.adp8681. PMC 11389779. PMID 39259789.
- 2Yang, Feiyao; Peng, Puguang; Yan, Zhao-Yi; Fan, Hongzhao; Li, Xiang; Li, Shaoxin; Liu, Houfang; Ren, Tian-Ling; Zhou, Yanguang; Wang, Zhong Lin; Wei, Di (March 2024). "Vertical iontronic energy storage based on osmotic effects and electrode redox reactions". Nature Energy. 9 (3): 263–271. Bibcode:2024NatEn...9..263Y. doi:10.1038/s41560-023-01431-4. ISSN 2058-7546.
- 3Li, Xiang; Li, Roujuan; Li, Shaoxin; Wang, Zhong Lin; Wei, Di (2024-07-23). "Triboiontronics with temporal control of electrical double layer formation". Nature Communications. 15 (1): 6182. Bibcode:2024NatCo..15.6182L. doi:10.1038/s41467-024-50518-3. ISSN 2041-1723. PMC 11263338. PMID 39039038.
- Wei, Di; Yang, Feiyao; Jiang, Zhuoheng; Wang, Zhonglin (2022-08-24). "Flexible iontronics based on 2D nanofluidic material". Nature Communications. 13 (1): 4965. Bibcode:2022NatCo..13.4965W. doi:10.1038/s41467-022-32699-x. ISSN 2041-1723. PMC 9402920. PMID 36002461.
- 5Yang, Lu; Yang, Feiyao; Liu, Xu; Li, Ke; Zhou, Yaning; Wang, Yangjian; Yu, Tianhao; Zhong, Mengjuan; Xu, Xiaobing; Zhang, Lijuan; Shen, Wei; Wei, Di (2021-04-20). "A moisture-enabled fully printable power source inspired by electric eels". Proceedings of the National Academy of Sciences. 118 (16) e2023164118. Bibcode:2021PNAS..11823164Y. doi:10.1073/pnas.2023164118. PMC 8072409. PMID 33846255.
