= Sears Building =

Sears Building is the name of a number of buildings across North America, most of which have been converted to other uses since being Sears regional headquarters, warehouses, and/or retail stores:

== Canada ==
- Toronto: 222 Jarvis Street

== Mexico ==
- Mexico City: Edificio La Nacional

== United States ==
- Los Angeles, California (Boyle Heights): Sears, Roebuck & Company Mail Order Building (Los Angeles, California)
- Los Angeles, California (Pico and Rimpau blvds., Mid-City): Sears, Roebuck and Company Retail Department Store-Pico Boulevard, Los Angeles
- Washington, DC: Sears, Roebuck and Company Department Store (Washington, D.C.)
- Miami, Florida: Sears, Roebuck and Company Department Store (Miami, Florida)
- Atlanta, Georgia: Ponce City Market (formerly known as City Hall East 1990–2011)
- Chicago, Illinois: Second Leiter Building
- Chicago, Illinois: Sears, Roebuck and Company Complex (also known as Sears Merchandise Building Tower)
- Chicago, Illinois: Willis Tower (former Sears Tower)
- Boston, Massachusetts: Landmark Center (Boston)
- Minneapolis, Minnesota: Midtown Exchange
- Camden, New Jersey: Sears, Roebuck and Company Retail Department Store-Camden
- Cleveland, Ohio: Sears Building at Case Western Reserve University
- Memphis, Tennessee: Sears Crosstown Concourse
- Knoxville, Tennessee: Sears Roebuck Building
- Kirkland, Washington: Joshua Sears Building
- Seattle, Washington: Sears Roebuck and Company Building
