= Lasserre =

Lasserre may refer to:

Places

- Lasserre, Ariège, in the Ariège department
- Lasserre, Haute-Garonne, in the Haute-Garonne department
- Lasserre, Lot-et-Garonne, in the Lot-et-Garonne department
- Lasserre, Pyrénées-Atlantiques, in the Pyrénées-Atlantiques department

People

- Augusto Lasserre (1826–1906), Argentinian naval officer
- Pierre Lasserre (1867–1930), French literary critic, journalist and essayist
- René Lasserre (1895–1965), French rugby union player
- Françoise Lasserre (born 1955), French conductor and artistic director

Ships

- ARA Augusto Lessarre (Q-9), a survey ship which served in the Argentine Navy from 1963 to 1969, previously the British Royal Navy frigate HMS Caicos

Establishments

- Lasserre, a restaurant in Paris
