= Single-ended =

Single-ended may refer to:

- Single ended recuperative burner, a type of gas burner used in industrial furnaces
- Single-ended signaling, the simplest commonly used method of transmitting electrical signals over wires
- Single-ended triode, an audio amplifier
- Single-ended playing card
