= Mason, Wisconsin =

- Village
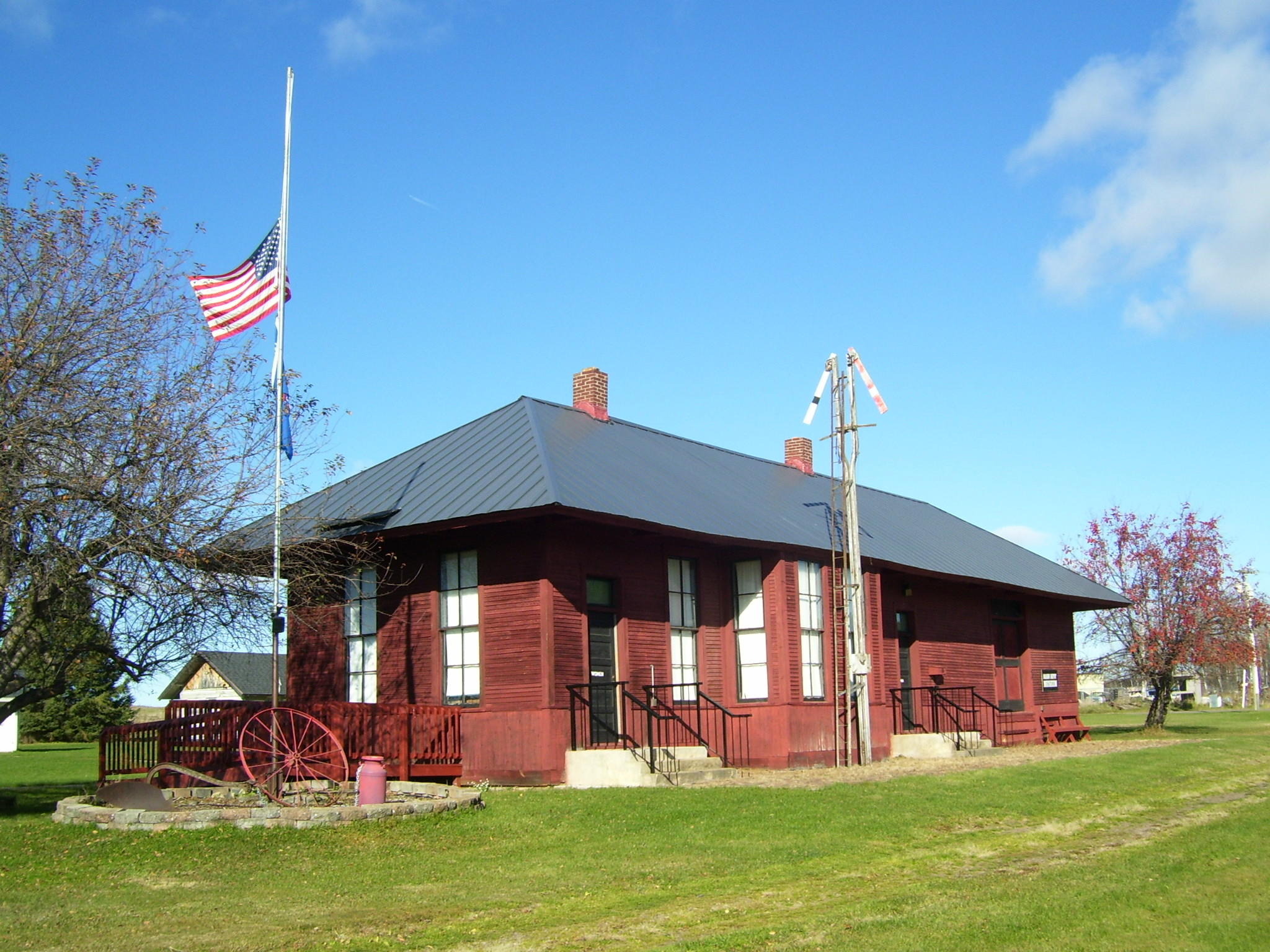
- The Mason Depot, home of the Mason Area Historical Society

- Location of Mason in Bayfield County, Wisconsin.
- Coordinates: 46°27′38″N 91°6′11″W
- Country: United States
- State: Wisconsin
- County: Bayfield

Area
  - Total: 0.71 sq mi (1.85 km^{2})
  - Land: 0.71 sq mi (1.85 km^{2})
  - Water: 0 sq mi (0.00 km^{2})
- Elevation: 945 ft (288 m)

Population (2020)
  - Total: 101
  - Density: 131.8/sq mi (50.89/km^{2})
- Time zone: UTC-6 (Central (CST))
  - Summer (DST): UTC-5 (CDT)
- ZIP code: 54856
- Area codes: 715 and 534
- FIPS code: 55-49925
- GNIS feature ID: 1569112
- Website: https://www.villageofmasonwi.com/

Mason is a village in Bayfield County, Wisconsin, United States. The population was 101 at the 2020 census. The village is located within the Town of Mason.

U.S. Highway 63 serves as a main route in the community.

== History ==
In the early 1880s, a railroad line, operated by the Chicago, St. Paul, Minneapolis and Omaha Railway was built to serve northern Wisconsin, crossing the White River at what would become the Village of Mason. After the railroad was established, John Alexander Humbird opened the White River Lumber Company on the banks of the White River. The mill served as the catalyst for the settling of the area. A post office called Mason has been in operation since 1883. The mill closed in 1914 when the area no longer contained enough trees to continue supporting the mill and the population of the town decreased significantly as a result. In 1925, the Village of Mason was incorporated, separate from the Township of Mason. The village's name honors Freemasonry.

== Geography ==
According to the United States Census Bureau, the village has a total area of 0.71 square miles (1.84 km^{2}), all land.

Mason is located 17 miles southwest of the city of Ashland; and 41 miles northeast of the city of Hayward.

== Demographics ==
Historical population
Census	Pop.	Note	%±
1930	153		—
1940	152		−0.7%
1950	140		−7.9%
1960	100		−28.6%
1970	119		19.0%
1980	102		−14.3%
1990	102		0.0%
2000	72		−29.4%
2010	93		29.2%
2020	101		8.6%
U.S. Decennial Census

=== 2020 census ===
As of the census of 2020, there were 101 people and 44 households, and 28 families living in the village. The population density was 142.25 inhabitants per square mile (54.9/km^{2}). There were 44 housing units at an average density of 62.0 per square mile (23.9/km^{2}). The racial makeup of the village was 86.1% White, 9.9% Native American, 2.0% African American, and 2.0% from two or more races.

There were 44 households, of which 34.6% had children under the age of 18 living with them, 35.7% were married couples living together, 25.0% had a female householder with no husband present, 17.9% had a male householder with no wife present, and 21.4% were non-families. The average family size was 3.19.

The median age in the village was 47.5 years. 14.1% of residents were 65 years of age or older. The gender makeup of the village was 50.5% male and 49.5% female.

The median income was $53,750 with 19.2% of residents in poverty.

=== 2010 census ===
As of the census of 2010, there were 93 people, 34 households, and 21 families living in the village. The population density was 131.0 inhabitants per square mile (50.6/km^{2}). There were 43 housing units at an average density of 60.6 per square mile (23.4/km^{2}). The racial makeup of the village was 81.7% White, 5.4% African American, 2.2% Native American, and 10.8% from two or more races. Hispanic or Latino of any race were 3.2% of the population.

There were 34 households, of which 41.2% had children under the age of 18 living with them, 44.1% were married couples living together, 11.8% had a female householder with no husband present, 5.9% had a male householder with no wife present, and 38.2% were non-families. 20.6% of all households were made up of individuals, and 14.7% had someone living alone who was 65 years of age or older. The average household size was 2.74 and the average family size was 2.90.

The median age in the village was 36.2 years. 28% of residents were under the age of 18; 8.5% were between the ages of 18 and 24; 22.6% were from 25 to 44; 28% were from 45 to 64; and 12.9% were 65 years of age or older. The gender makeup of the village was 50.5% male and 49.5% female.

=== 2000 census ===
As of the census of 2000, there were 72 people, 26 households, and 19 families living in the village. The population density was 141.8 people per square mile (54.5/km^{2}). There were 35 housing units at an average density of 68.9 per square mile (26.5/km^{2}). The racial makeup of the village was 87.50% White, 4.17% Native American, 4.17% Asian, and 4.17% from two or more races.

There were 26 households, out of which 30.8% had children under the age of 18 living with them, 69.2% were married couples living together, 7.7% had a female householder with no husband present, and 23.1% were non-families. 23.1% of all households were made up of individuals, and 7.7% had someone living alone who was 65 years of age or older. The average household size was 2.77 and the average family size was 3.30.

In the village, the population was spread out, with 31.9% under the age of 18, 4.2% from 18 to 24, 26.4% from 25 to 44, 20.8% from 45 to 64, and 16.7% who were 65 years of age or older. The median age was 37 years. For every 100 females, there were 100.0 males. For every 100 females age 18 and over, there were 96.0 males.

The median income for a household in the village was $32,917, and the median income for a family was $34,583. Males had a median income of $19,583 versus $13,125 for females. The per capita income for the village was $12,742. There were 15.4% of families and 30.6% of the population living below the poverty line, including 100.0% of under eighteens and none of those over 64.

== Notable people ==
- Thorvald A. Solberg, United States Admiral was born in Mason.
- Samuel E. Squires, Wisconsin State Representative was Chairman of Mason.
