= Pradère-les-Bourguets =

- Part of Lasserre-Pradère
- Location of Pradère-les-Bourguets
- Location within France Location within Occitanie
- Coordinates: 43°38′30″N 1°10′01″E
- Country: France
- Region: Occitania
- Department: Haute-Garonne
- Arrondissement: Toulouse
- Canton: Léguevin
- Commune: Lasserre-Pradère
- Area^{1}: 4.89 km^{2} (1.89 sq mi)
- Elevation: 140 m (460 ft)
- Highest elevation: 160 m (520 ft)
- Lowest elevation: 128 m (420 ft)
- Population (2017): 540
  - Density: 110/km^{2} (290/sq mi)
- Time zone: UTC+01:00 (CET)
  - Summer (DST): UTC+02:00 (CEST)
- Postal code: 31530
- ^{1} French Land Register data, which excludes lakes, ponds, glaciers > 1 km^{2} (0.386 sq mi or 247 acres) and river estuaries.

Pradère-les-Bourguets (French pronunciation: [pʁadɛʁ le buʁɡɛ]; Occitan: Pradèra e les Borguets) is a former commune in the Haute-Garonne department in southwestern France. On 1 January 2018, it was merged into the new commune of Lasserre-Pradère.

== See also ==
- Communes of the Haute-Garonne department
