= Thorvald A. Solberg =

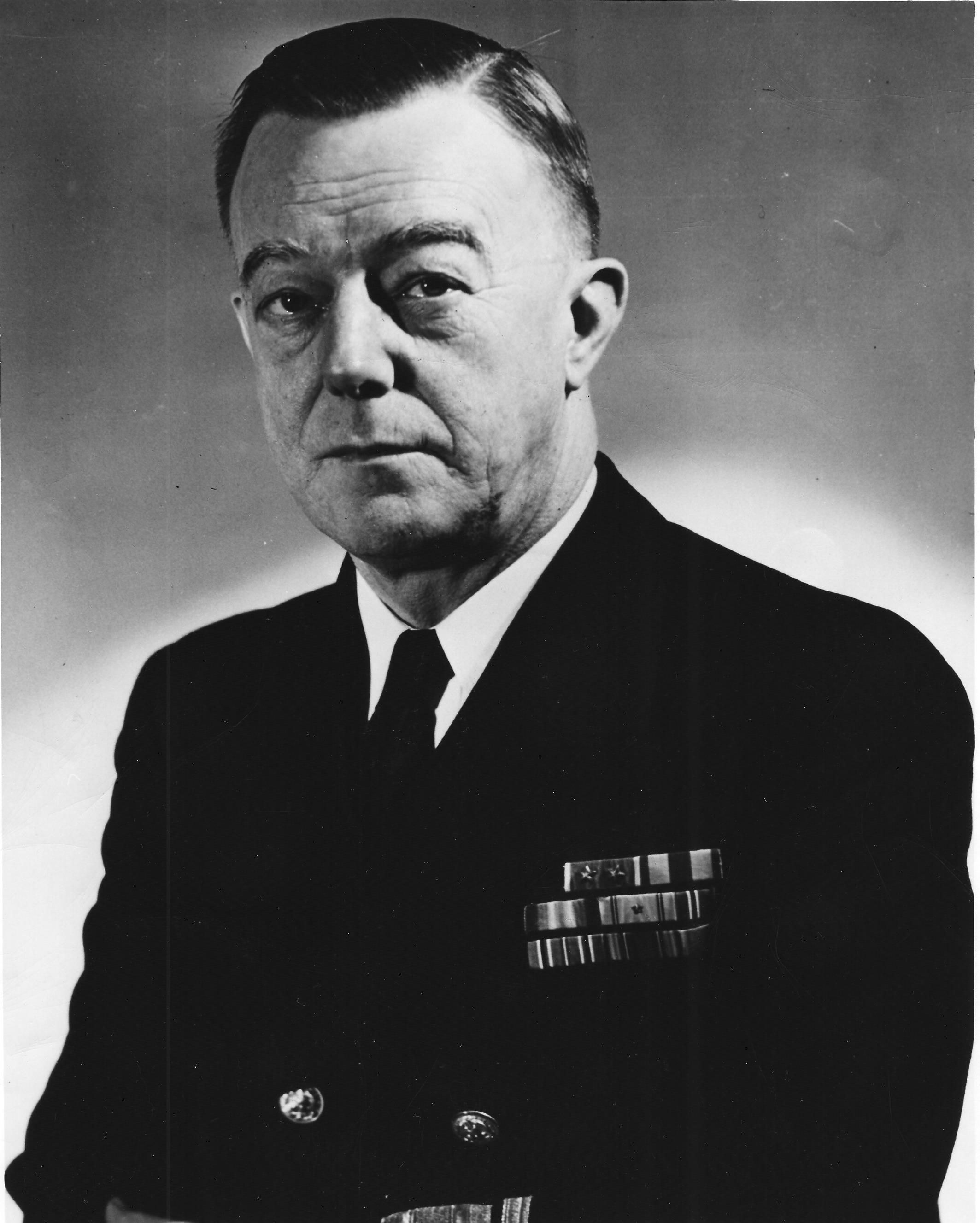
- Rear Admiral Thorvald A. Solberg
- Born: 17 February 1894; Mason, Wisconsin, U.S.
- Died: 16 May 1964 (aged 70); Philadelphia, Pennsylvania, U.S.
- Burial place: Arlington National Cemetery
- Military career
- Allegiance: United States
- Branch: United States Navy
- Service years: 1916–1951
- Rank: Rear Admiral
- Service number: O-2552
- Commands: Office of Naval Research
- Conflicts: World War I World War II
- Awards: Legion of Merit (3); Order of the British Empire

Rear Admiral Thorvald A. Solberg (17 February 1894 – 16 May 1964) was a senior officer in the United States Navy, and the Chief of the Office of Naval Research from 1948 to 1951.

== Biography ==
Thorvald A. Solberg was born in Mason, Wisconsin, on 17 February 1894, the son of Norwegian immigrants Thomas and Martha Solberg. In 1905, the family moved to Sandpoint, Idaho, where he graduated from Sandpoint High School in 1911.

Solberg was appointed to the United States Naval Academy in Annapolis, Maryland by Senator William Borah of Idaho, and was commissioned in the United States Navy as an ensign on graduation in 1916. During World War I he served on board the cruiser USS Tacoma.

Solberg studied electrical engineering at the Naval Postgraduate School, and then attended Columbia University, receiving a Master of Science (M.S.) degree in 1924. In 1931 and 1932 he worked on the development of a boiler compound to prevent the buildup of limescale in ships' boilers. This was approved by the Bureau of Engineering in its 1933 "Standard Navy Boiler Compound Specifications".

During World War II, he was an engineering officer on the staff of the Commander, Battle Force from July 1939 to April 1941. He then went to London as a naval observer. He returned to the United States in March 1944, and served with the Bureau of Ships until October 1946. He was promoted to the rank of rear admiral in 1945, with his seniority backdated to December 1942.

During Operation Crossroads in 1946, Solberg was responsible for preparing the target fleet. As head of the Bureau of Ships' Research and Standards Branch, he was also appointed to the Military Liaison Committee of the Atomic Energy Commission in November 1946. He became the Chief of the Office of Naval Research in 1948, a position he held until he retired in 1951.

Solberg was thrice awarded the Legion of Merit. In 1947, Solberg Inlet in Antarctica was named after him by the Ronne Antarctic Research Expedition (RARE) in recognition of the assistance given to the expedition by Solberg and the Office of Naval Research. He was also appointed Honorary Knight Commander of the Order of the British Empire for his service for the allied cause.

He was forced to retire in 1951 after reaching 35 years of service. He died on 16 March 1964, and was buried in Arlington National Cemetery.
