= Darren Cullen (graffiti artist) =

British graffiti artist

Ser
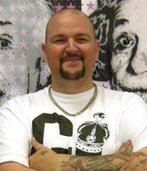
- Ser in his London studio, 2014
- Born: Darren James Cullen; 1973 or 1974 (age 51–52)
- Known for: Graffiti, public art, stenciling
- Movement: Graffiti

Darren Cullen (born 1973 or 1974) is a London-based professional graffiti artist who is known by the tag name SER. Cullen emerged as an artist from the British graffiti art scene in the early 1980s.

== Early life ==
Cullen grew up in Croydon, United Kingdom, where he became active in the graffiti and street art scene starting in 1983. His graffiti name "Ser" was originated as a crew name, which stood for "South East Rockers" – an unorganized crew name used by other graffiti artists in the south east area of London. When other graffiti artists stopped using the name "Ser", Cullen adopted the name as his own.

== Artwork ==
In 2012, Cullen worked for the London 2012 Olympic Games, painting the stage sets for the opening ceremony.

Cullen created a Hyperrealist mural of Kate Middleton and a "royal baby" on a wall at Brookland Lake, Snodland, Kent.

Cullen has been donating pieces of artwork to non-profit organizations for underprivileged children.

Rockmount Infants School in Upper Norwood received a council community grant to commission Cullen and fellow artist Paul Barlow to paint two sea murals on the classroom walls.

Cullen has given credit to street artist Banksy saying: "If it wasn't for Banksy, graffiti would still be about vandalism".

== Business ventures ==
Cullen founded Graffiti Kings, a commercial graffiti and street art company based in Leake Street in London. The company provided spraycan artwork and branding to major international brands. They have also appeared on BBC TV programme Young Apprentice. Graffiti Kings represents around 30 artists.

=== History ===
Graffiti Kings was founded in 1999 as a movement by Cullen. Graffiti Kings became an organised business in 2007.

==== Graffiti Vehicles ====
Graffiti Kings gave the London Tonight Olympic cab a new look. The cab was used by London Tonight presenter Ben Scotchbrook to interview the public and get their views on the 2012 Summer Olympics. Ben Scotchbrook said the "Graffiti Kings are artistic royalty"

Green campaigner Mr Peg from Croydon commissioned the Graffiti Kings to paint his chip fat-powered eco bus in return for a pallet of Tangy Toms crisps before it went on a worldwide tour to help promote low carbon use.

=== Live performances ===
Graffiti Kings take part in a live online hashtag campaign that was featured on the Sony Facebook and Twitter social media sites.

Graffiti Kings produce a live piece of art in front of shoppers to help launch the opening of a new store in Trinity Leeds.

=== Graffiti Workshops ===
Students from South Worcestershire College England work with the Graffiti Kings to paint a colourful graffiti art mural in their college youth centre. Graffiti Kings help the visitors at the National Railway Museum in York England to produce graffiti art murals over a 2-week period.

Graffiti Kings has been holding weekend graffiti workshops at the Banksy Tunnel in London to explain the distinctions between graffiti and street art.

== Community work ==
Cullen has admitted to engaging in vandalism and tagging while growing up in Croydon, but after later turning his work into a legal, commercial activity, Cullen was commissioned by Merton Council to run graffiti workshops for young people. The workshops aimed to reduce vandalism and to foster an understanding of graffiti art and its positive uses among at-risk youth in Croydon by offering opportunities for graffiti artists to practise their art legally on designated walls.

Val Shawcross from the GLA's anti-graffiti committee visited Cullen while he painted a 300-yard-long subway. Local youths from South Norwood London helped Cullen paint the mural, which was part of the Croydon Council Smarter Croydon initiative.

Cullen has received the backing of the British Government for his work to prevent graffiti on trains. Cullen has painted 15 train stations, the first being Wallington Train Station in Sutton south London. The Wallington project had more than fifty young people taking part and around 300 more arrived to watch the event.

== Opinion on graffiti ==
In July 2012 interview, Cullen told Rebecca Cafe of BBC News and said he was confused as to why the graffiti walls in East London were all of a sudden being cleaned. The walls in East London "the mecca of graffiti" had been there for years, but with the Olympics about to start the authorities wanted to clean the streets.

In November 2013, in an interview with The Economist, Cullen said that in his view graffiti had become respectable. Cullen went on to say that graffiti had evolved due to a number of factors. Magazines and documentaries documenting good graffiti art and spray paint had been produced especially for graffiti. The paint now gave the artist more control over his artwork, he said.
