= Lasserre-Pradère =

- Commune
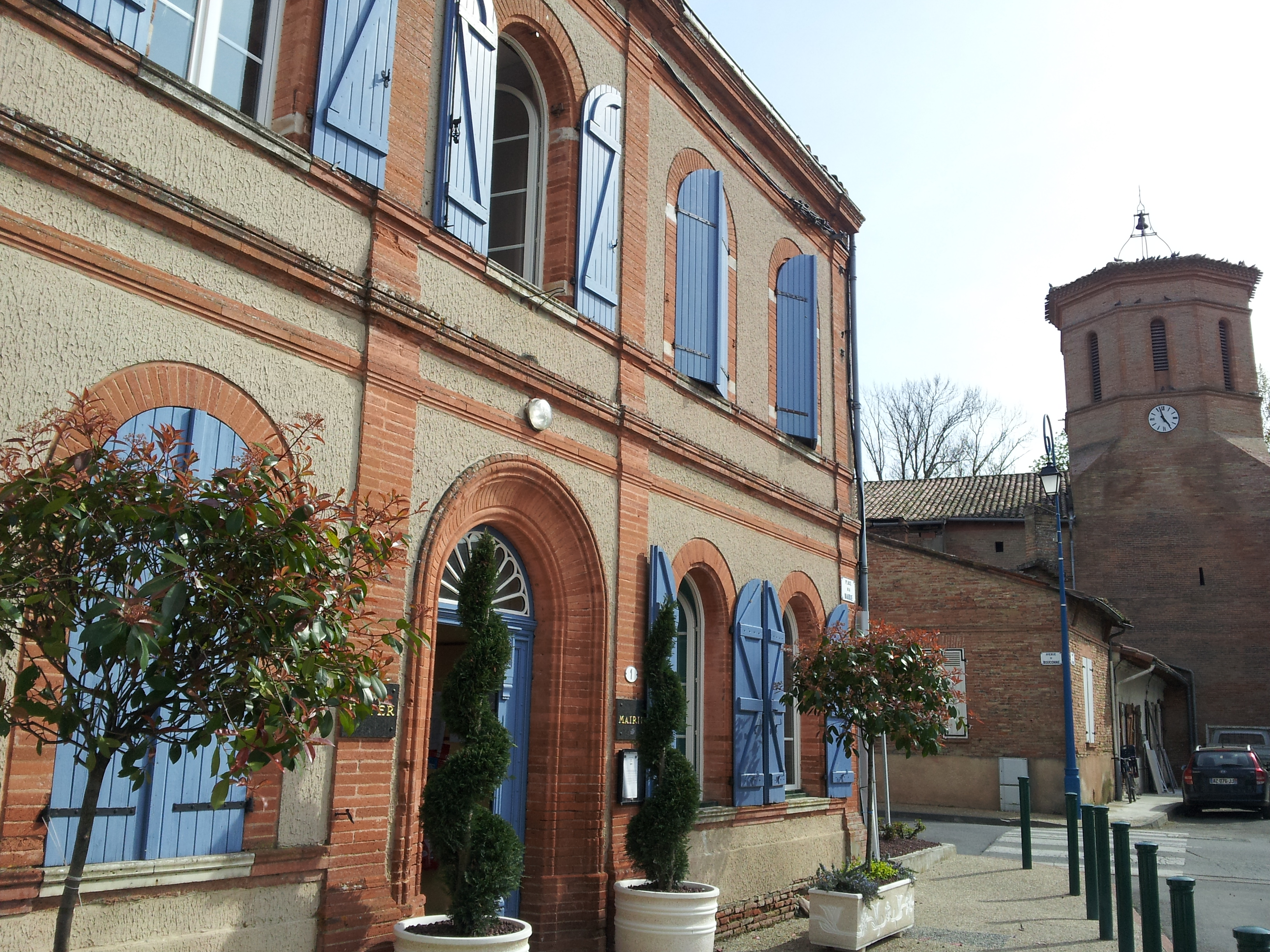
- The town hall and church in Lasserre
- Location of Lasserre-Pradère
- Location within France Location within Occitanie
- Coordinates: 43°38′23″N 1°10′10″E
- Country: France
- Region: Occitania
- Department: Haute-Garonne
- Arrondissement: Toulouse
- Canton: Léguevin
- Intercommunality: CC Le Grand Ouest Toulousain

Government
  - Mayor (2020–2026): Hervé Serniguet
- Area^{1}: 14.40 km^{2} (5.56 sq mi)
- Population (2023): 1,574
  - Density: 109.3/km^{2} (283.1/sq mi)
- Time zone: UTC+01:00 (CET)
  - Summer (DST): UTC+02:00 (CEST)
- INSEE/Postal code: 31277 /31530
- ^{1} French Land Register data, which excludes lakes, ponds, glaciers > 1 km^{2} (0.386 sq mi or 247 acres) and river estuaries.

Lasserre-Pradère (French pronunciation: [lasɛʁ pʁadɛʁ]; Occitan: La Sèrra e Pradèra) is a commune in the department of Haute-Garonne, southern France. The municipality was established on 1 January 2018 by merger of the former communes of Lasserre (the seat) and Pradère-les-Bourguets.

== See also ==
- Communes of the Haute-Garonne department
