= Serres (disambiguation) =

Serres (Greek: Σέρρες) is a city in Greece, seat of the Serres regional unit.

Serres may also refer to:

== Places ==
In Germany:

- Serres, Germany, a part of Wiernsheim in Baden-Württemberg

In Greece:

- Serres, a city in Central Macedonia
  - Serres railway station
- Serres Province
- Serres Prefecture
- Serres (constituency)
- Serres (regional unit)
- Principality of Serres, a principality from 1355 until 1371 with the capital being Serres

In France:

- Serres, Aude in the Aude département
- Serres, Hautes-Alpes in the Hautes-Alpes département
- Serres, Meurthe-et-Moselle in the Meurthe-et-Moselle département

== People ==
- Dominic Serres (1710–1793), French-born marine painter in England
- Emiliano Serres (born 1997), Uruguayan basketballer
- Étienne Serres (1786–1868), French embryologist
- Günther Serres (1910–1981), German politician
- John Thomas Serres (1759–1825), marine painter and son of Dominic Serres
- Michel Serres (1930–2019), French philosopher
- Olivia Serres (1772–1834), English painter, writer, and impostor who claimed the title Princess Olive of Cumberland
- Olivier de Serres (1539–1619), French agricultural writer

== See also ==
- Serres-Castet, in the Pyrénées-Atlantiques département of France
  - Serres-Morlaàs
  - Serres-Sainte-Marie
  - Serres-et-Montguyard
  - Serres-Gaston
- Serre (disambiguation)
