= Sere (name) =

Sere is a name which is used as a surname and a given name. People with the name include:

== Surname ==
- Amadou Séré (born 1987), Burkinabé football player
- Boubacar Séré (born 1984), Burkinabé athlete
- Emile La Sére (1802–1882), American politician
- Émilienne de Sère, French singer
- Kaisa Sere (1954–2012), Finnish computer scientist

== Given name ==
- Sere Matsumura (born 2003), Japanese football player

== Other uses ==
- Sere (rapper) (born 1976), stage name of Finnish rapper Matti Huhta
- Octave Séré, pseudonym of the French music critic Jean Poueigh
