= Seares =

Seares may refer to:

- Seares (Castropol), a parish in Castropol, Asturias, Spain
- Seares (crater), a lunar impact crater located in the northern part of the Moon's far side
- Frederick Hanley Seares (1873–1964), American astronomer

== See also ==
- Sears, an American chain of department stores
- Sears (disambiguation)
