= S. E. (name) =

The initials S. E. have been used by several people, including:

- S. E. Cottam (1863–1943), English poet and priest
- S. E. Cupp (born 1979), American political commentator
- S. E. Gontarski (born 1942), scholar
- S. E. Hinton (born 1948), American author
- S. E. Krupa Rao (1939–1993), pastor
- S. E. Lister (born 1988), English novelist
- S. E. Rogers (1888–1965), Manitoba politician
- S. E. Rogie (1926–1994), singer and guitarist
- S. E. Runganadhan (1877–1966), Indian educationist
- S. E. Squires (1882–1967), American politician
- S. E. Winbolt (1868–1944), English archaeologist
