= Louis Serre =

Louis Serre may refer to:

- Louis Serre (physician)
- Louis Serre (politician)
