= Vasa övningsskola =

Location
- Kyrkoesplanaden 11-13 (preschool-9); Skolhusgatan 31 (gymnasium); Vaasa, Finland; Finland
- Coordinates: 63°5′40.38″N 21°36′31.62″E

Information
- Type: Public
- Established: 1684; 342 years ago
- Principal: Bernt Klockars
- Grades: preschool, 1-12, IB DP
- Affiliation: Åbo Akademi University
- Vice-principal, Principal of grades 1-9: Elisabet Backlund-Kärjenmäki
- Principal of Upper Secondary Education: Mats Borgmästars

Vasa övningsskola (VÖS) is a Swedish-speaking normal school in Vaasa, Finland. VÖS is a part of Åbo Akademi University, and its Faculty of Education and Welfare Studies located in Vaasa. It is the only Swedish normal school in Finland. VÖS provides preschool, primary and lower and upper secondary education, and in addition is one of the 17 schools in Finland with an International Baccalaureate upper secondary school programme.

The predecessor of VÖS was Wasa Trivialskola, which was officially founded in 1684, although teaching began already in 1611. The name Trivialskola refers to the trivium, and in that time, the subjects were religion, Latin and Greek. In 1844, the school changed its name to Vasa Gymnasium. In the town fire of Vaasa in 1852, the school building was destroyed, and upon rebuilding, the school was located to its present location in the center of the city, next to the church of Vaasa on Kirkkopuistikko (Swedish: Kyrkoesplanaden).

In rankings based on scores of the Finnish matriculation examination, the upper secondary school of VÖS (Vasa övningsskola gymnasium) has been ranked as #8 of the 35 Swedish-speaking schools of Finland. The average score was 25.1, slightly higher than the national average of 24.0, which score nevertheless places it #1 in the city of Vaasa. 104 students completed the matriculation examination in 2009, and 49% gained admission to tertiary education immediately upon graduation.

Former students of the school include Finland's national poet Johan Ludvig Runeberg (1804–1877).

== See also ==
- Education in Finland
