= Sear =

Sear might refer to:-

== People ==
- Cliff Sear (1936–2000), a Welsh footballer
- Helen Sear (born 1955), a Welsh photographic artist
- Morey Leonard Sear (1929–2004), a United States federal judge
- Tammy Sear (born 1977), a British former competitive figure skater
- Walter Sear (1930–2010), an American recording engineer and musician

== Places ==
- Sahar Elevated Access Road, an elevated express access road in Mumbai, India

== Other uses ==
- Sear (firearm), part of the trigger mechanism on a firearm
- Sear, to cook by searing, a cooking technique which quickly cooks the exterior of a food item
- Sear, a client for the WorldForge MMORPG framework
- Seir (demon), a Prince of Hell; also spelled Sear
- S_{E}Ar, the Hughes–Ingold symbol for the electrophilic aromatic substitution reaction

== See also ==
- Cere, part of the beak of some birds
- Sears (disambiguation)
- Seer (disambiguation)
- Seir (disambiguation)
- Sere (disambiguation)
