= Richard Sears =

Richard Sears may refer to:

- Richard Warren Sears (1863–1914), founder of Sears, Roebuck and Co.
- Richard Sears (pilgrim) (1595–1676), early settler of Yarmouth, Cape Cod, Massachusetts
- Richard Sears (tennis) (1861–1943), American tennis player
- Dick Sears (politician) (1943–2024), Vermont state senator

== See also ==
- Dick Seers (1926–2022), Australian speedway rider
