= Robert Sears =

Robert Sears may refer to:

- Robert Sears (sportsman) (1884–1979), American fencer and modern pentathlete
- Robert Sears (physician), contemporary American pediatrician
- Robert Richardson Sears (1908–1989), American psychologist
