= Truesight =

Young adult and science fiction novel, by American author David Stahler Jr.

- Truesight
- Author: David Stahler Jr.
- Language: English
- Series: Truesight Trilogy
- Genre: Young adult, Science fiction novel
- Publisher: Eos Books
- Publication date: 2004
- Publication place: United States
- Media type: Print (hardback & paperback)
- ISBN: 0-15-205826-5 (first edition, hardcover)
- OCLC: 52895593
- LC Class: PZ7.P44855 Lif 2006
- Followed by: The Seer

Truesight is a young adult and science fiction novel, by American author David Stahler Jr. It is the first book of the Truesight Trilogy.

== Plot summary ==
Truesight, a novel written by David Stahler Jr., takes place in the futuristic colony, Harmony Station, which is located on a foreign planet. Everyone in Harmony is willingly or genetically blind. They follow the philosophy of Truesight in which people cannot see, so they do not get caught up in an external beauty of the world but an internal beauty of people.

The protagonist, Jacob, is a 12 going on 13-year-old boy living in Harmony station on Nova Campi. While at school, he has a terrible headache that is described as being like “a web of fire.” The headaches eventually leads to Jacob receiving sight. The novel portrays this as a gradual shift from blur to clarity. While in the early stages of his sight's development, Egan, Jacob's best friend, proposes that they check out a delivery. Deliveries are the rare occasions in which “seers” bring supplies or food from Harmony's Earth-based foundation located in Australia. Harmony's rules state that every citizen must be inside their houses during a delivery following the curfew unless otherwise authorized. Jacob manages to escape his house and he finds a bush to hide behind to check out the delivery. He finds another of his friends, Delaney, who is the daughter of the high councilor, and his mother's prime music student, there too. Both of them are discovered and run in different directions. Jacob gets back to his house, but Delaney dies.

Later, after running down a hill with Egan and falling, Jacob can see clearly. He has to keep his sight a secret. He skips school one day and saves a field worker's life but cannot tell anyone because he would be discovered. He plays games in which he avoids other people's detection as he passes them on the streets. He enjoys this sight, but that goes against the very foundation of his community. He tells Egan the secret of his sight, but Egan turns him in. Jacob is taken to the high councilor's house and is sentenced to surgery to remove his sight as well as his memory of sight. He conflicts. He goes to Delaney's grave using a tool people in Harmony use to find other people called a finder. However, he concludes that she's not dead, but that she ran away because the finder points away from the community. He doesn't run away to find her too due to his lack of preparation.

While Jacob is preparing for his surgery, he talks to the high councilor. He learns that the high councilor is having an affair with Jacob's mother and that the high councilor can see too. Jacob jumps up and runs away. He grabs provisions from his house and exits Harmony “for good”

== Major themes ==
Critics have noted that Truesight’s “science-fiction theme” deals with the role of society and hypocrisy. Kirkus Reviews noted that “the conflict between individual and society” plays a key role in Truesight. Kirkus Reviews called the society a “dystopia”. Publishers Weekly also noted that Truesight revolves around “the dangers of fundamentalism”. Kirkus Weekly also claimed that Truesight uses the theme of hypocrisy through pointing out “unevenly distributed food, government corruption, and the misery of his friend Delaney” (Kirkus). Inkweaver Review showed that Truesight “revolves around the theme of what happens when we close our eyes to what is around”. Publishers Weekly showed the hypocrisy thought describing how “his supposedly pious, tightly knit, morally upright community harbors thieves, adulterers, and hypocrites".

== Reception ==
The School Library Journal compared Truesight to “Lois Lowry’s The Giver”. Critics from Inkweaver Reviews called it a “remarkable debut novel”. Publishers Weekly claimed that “Stahler does a remarkable job". Some critics described it as memorable. The School Library Journal claimed that “fans...will find it absorbing”. Inkweaver also said that this would make “a great read”.

However, not all reviews were as positive. The School Library Journal stated that there were “less attractive aspects of the story”. Publishers Weekly also claimed that “the story can be easily anticipated”. Some critics like Kirkus Review called Truesight “an interesting concept marred by poor execution”.

== Background ==
While at Dartmouth College working for his master's degree, David Stahler Jr. wrote his thesis "which turned into the novel Truesight" soon after.

== Bibliography ==
- Stahler Jr., David (2004). Truesight. New York: Harper Collins Publisher. ISBN 978-0-7569-5124-5.
