= William Sears =

William Sears may refer to:

- William Sears (Baháʼí) (1911–1992), American author, sportscaster and prominent member of the Baháʼí Faith
- William Sears (physician) (born 1939), American pediatrician and author
- William Sears (politician) (died 1929), Irish politician
- William J. Sears (1874–1944), U.S. Representative from Florida
- William R. Sears (1913–2002), American aerodynamicist
- William R. Sears (New York politician) (1928–1998), New York politician
