= Graffiti in the United Kingdom =

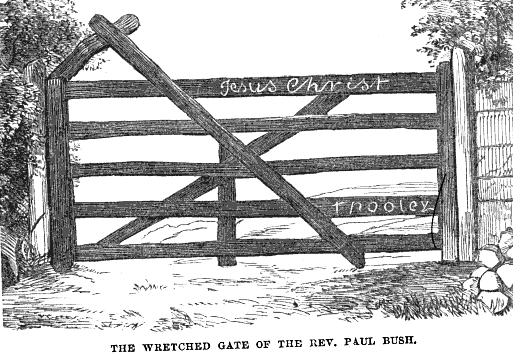
- Illustration of graffiti relating to the Thomas Pooley blasphemy case, 1857
- Years active: 1980s–present (on a large scale)
- Major figures: Banksy; Ben Eine; Robbo; Tox
- Influences: Electro and hip hop culture
- Influenced: Street art in the UK

Since the 1980s, the introduction of hip hop and electro music brought street art and graffiti to the UK on a large scale. This was further expanded with the introduction of custom made spray paint which allowed artists to create even more artistic and experimental graffiti. Notably, Banksy is arguably one of the most famous graffiti artists in the UK, but it was the crews such as DryBreadZ who first gained recognition. Examples of UK graffiti artists include: Banksy, Stik, Inkie, Sweet Toof and My Dog Sighs.

Graffiti was not considered a credible form of art until the 2000s with the likes of Alex Martinez spreading awareness of this new type of art form. As a result of this art collectors began to get street artists to do commissioned pieces of art for them which lead to graffiti becoming a viable option for street artists to earn some money.

== Law ==
When the criminal damage caused by the graffiti exceeds £5,000 the maximum penalty for individuals aged 18 or more is 10 years imprisonment and the maximum penalty for people ages between 12 and 17 is a detention and training order up to 24 months. Alternatively if the damage is less than £5,000 the maximum sentence possible is 3 months imprisonment or a total fine of £2,500 for adults. The Anti-social Behaviour Act 2003 allows police community support officers an alternative remedy by allowing them to issue penalty notices of £50.

Penalties for graffiti and vandalism have occasionally caused controversy in the UK. For example, public demonstrations occurred after the prison suicide of graffiti artist Tom Collister, who had received a 20 month sentence for vandalism.

== Gallery ==
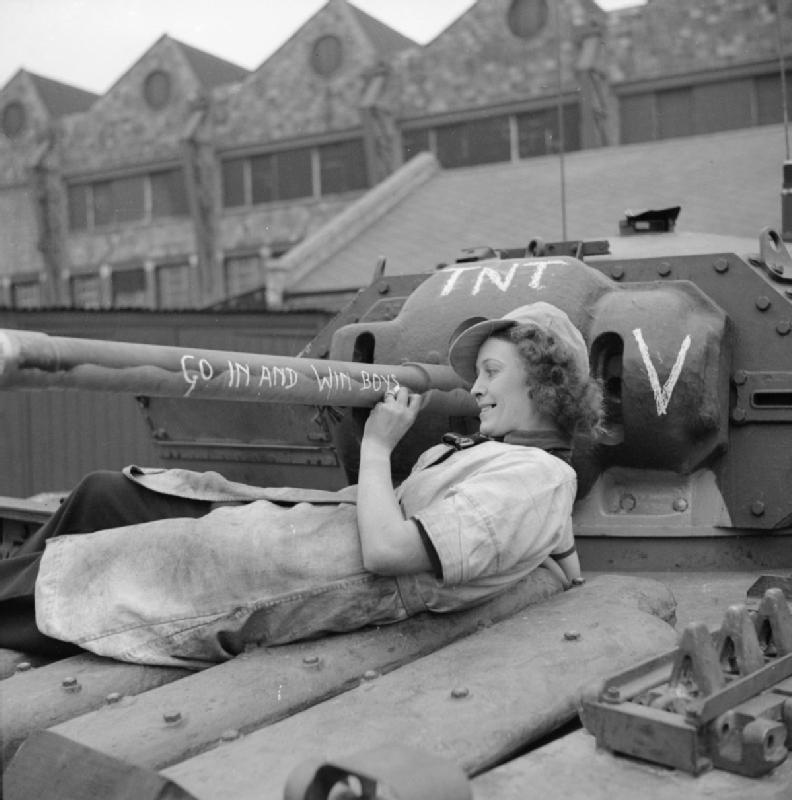
A woman writes graffiti on a Covenanter tank, 1942

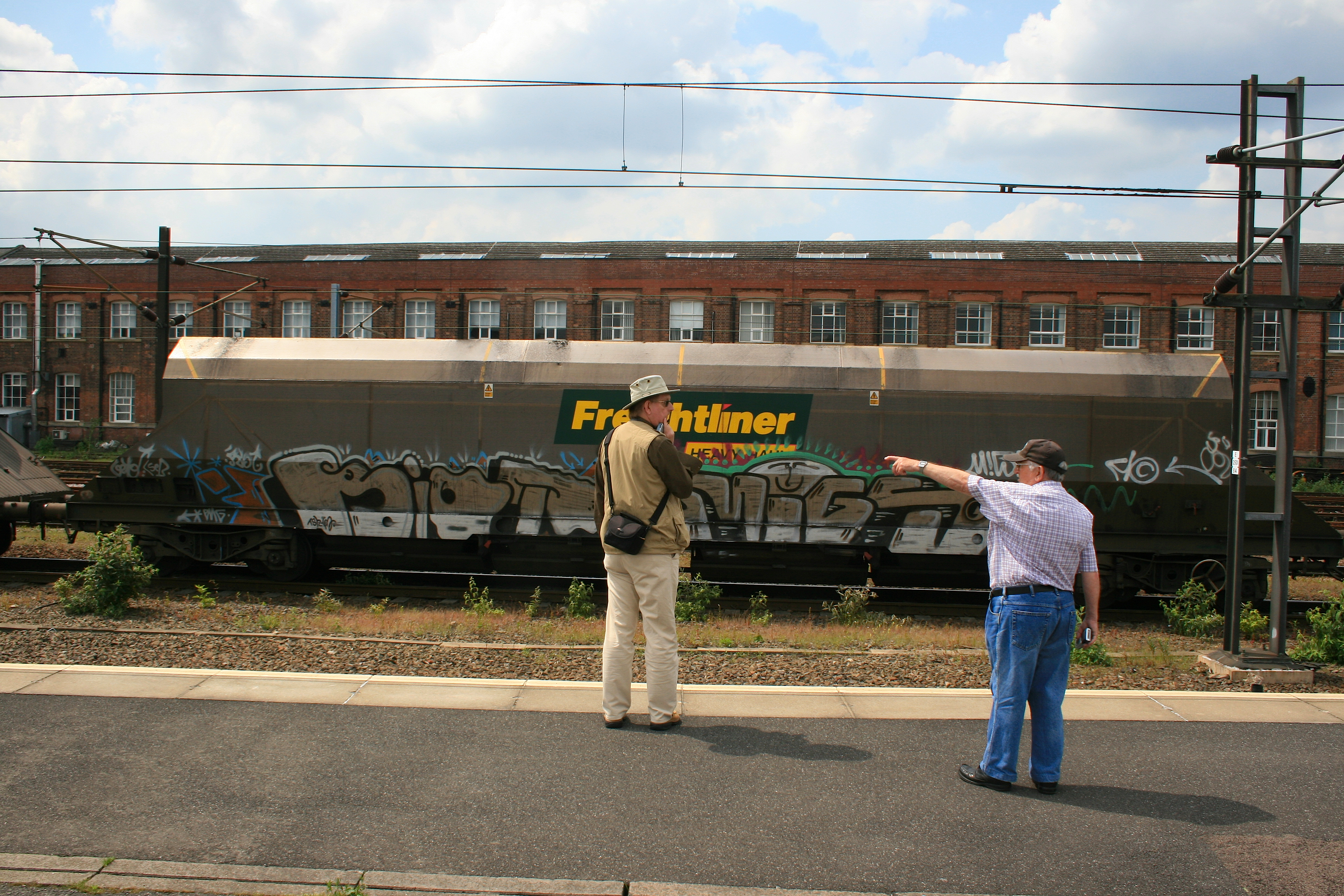
Graffiti on a Freightliner coal hopper at Doncaster railway station, with two trainspotters in the foreground

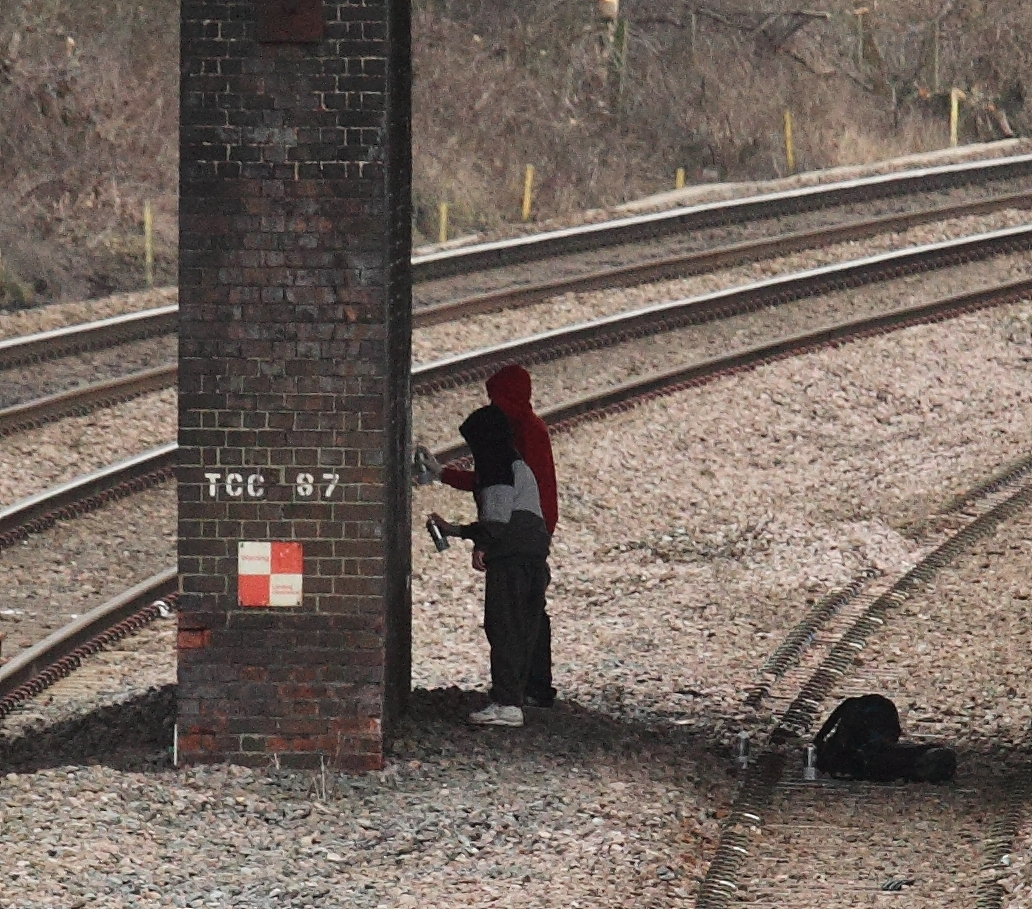
A pair of graffiti artists painting a bridge on the Erewash Valley line, 2010

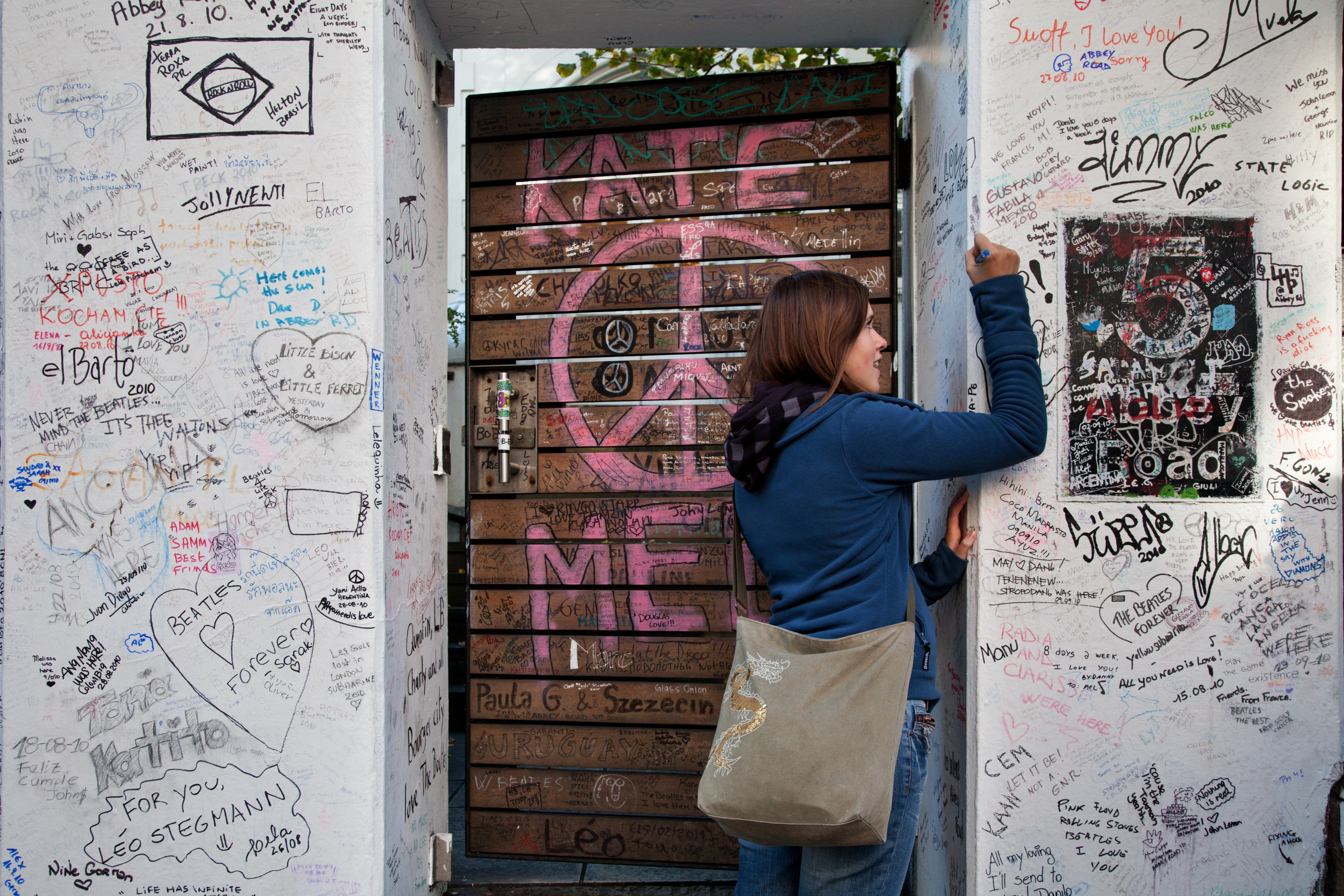
A woman writing graffiti on the Abbey Road Studios, 2010

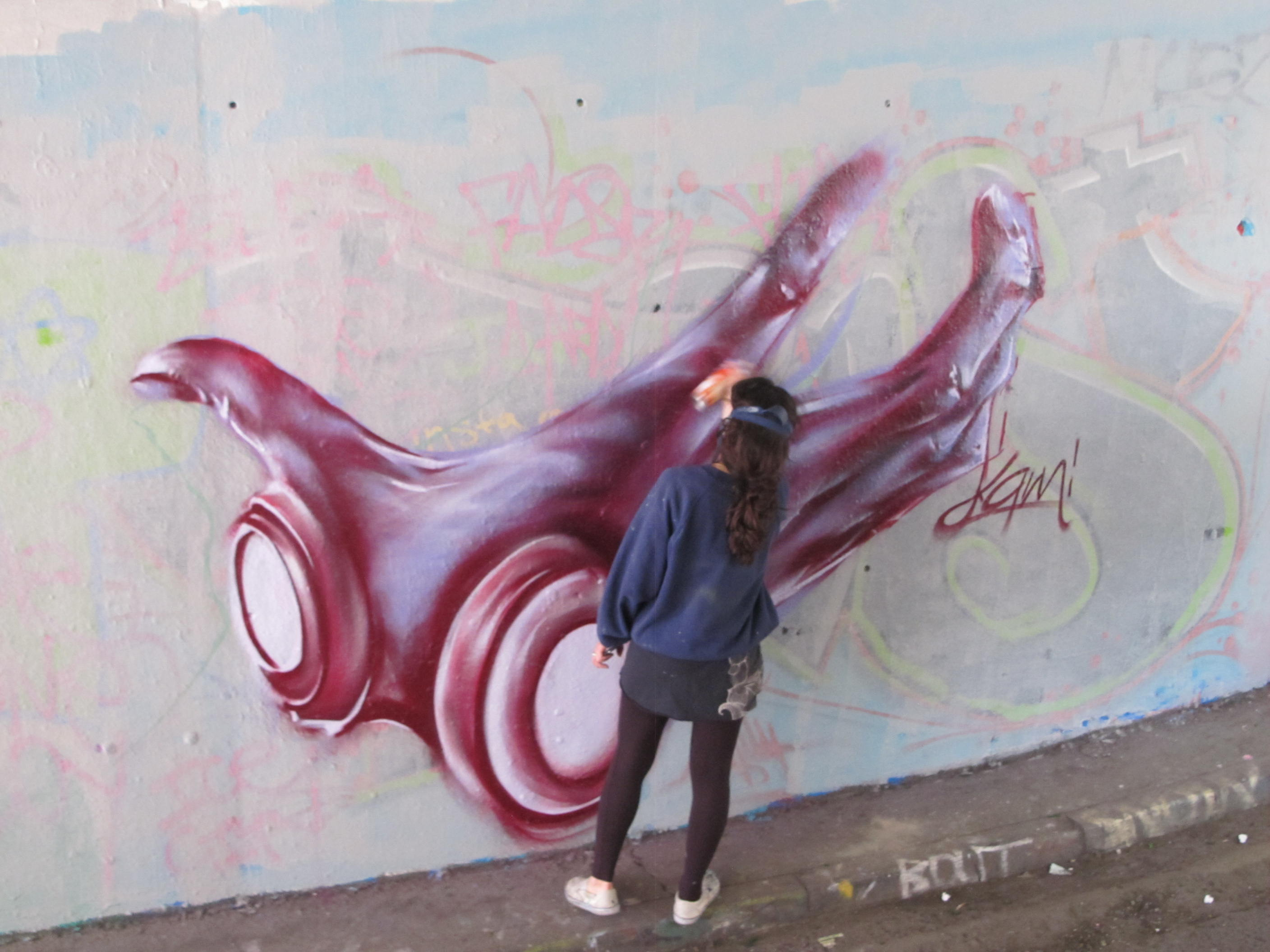
A graffiti artist in the Leake Street tunnel in London, 2016

== See also ==
- Leake Street
