= Lasserre, Haute-Garonne =

Lasserre
- Part of Lasserre-Pradère
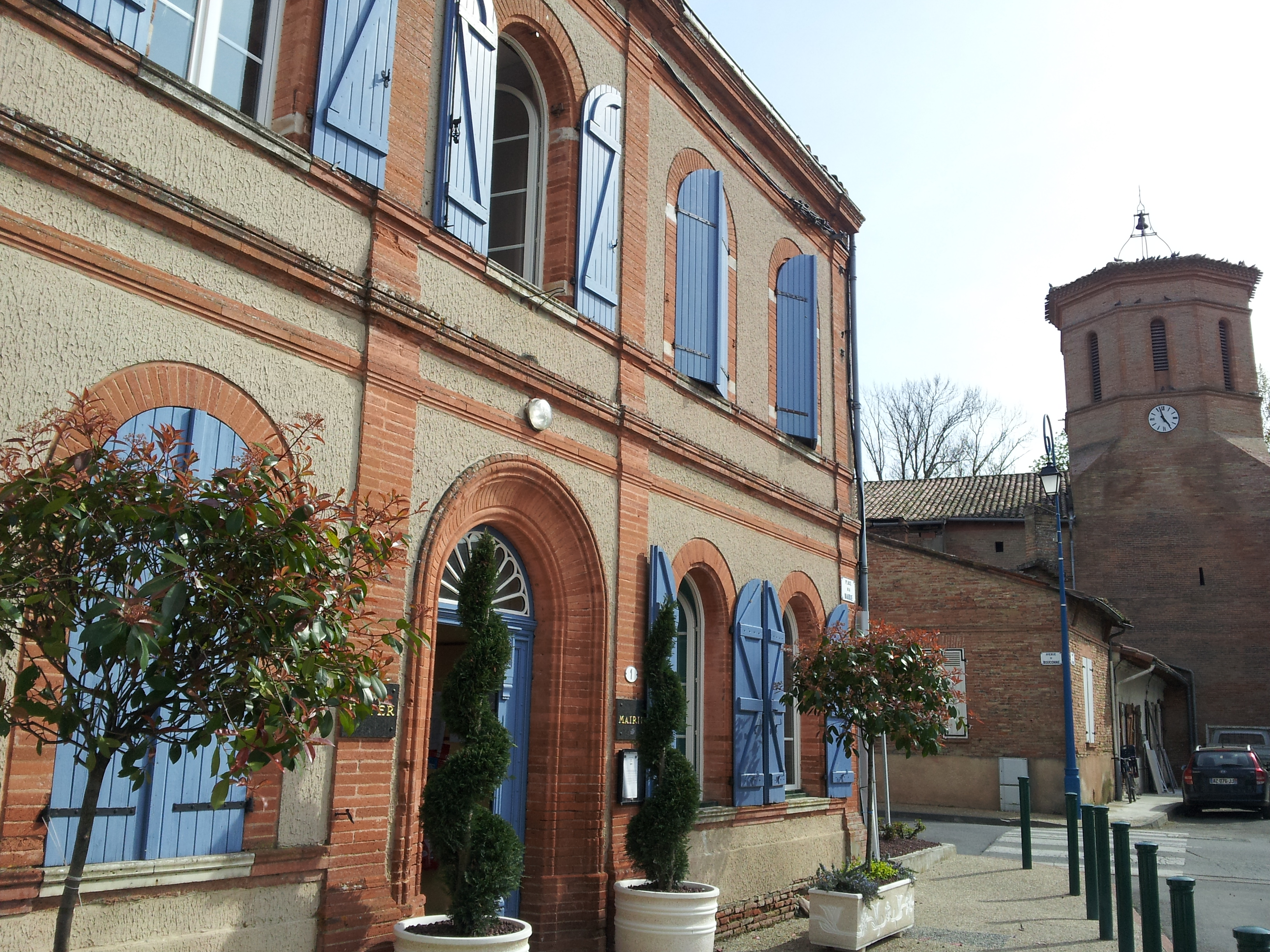
- Town hall
- Location of Lasserre
- Location within France Location within Occitanie
- Coordinates: 43°38′23″N 1°10′10″E
- Country: France
- Region: Occitania
- Department: Haute-Garonne
- Arrondissement: Toulouse
- Canton: Léguevin
- Commune: Lasserre-Pradère
- Area^{1}: 9.51 km^{2} (3.67 sq mi)
- Elevation: 179 m (587 ft)
- Highest elevation: 253 m (830 ft)
- Lowest elevation: 145 m (476 ft)
- Population (2017): 982
  - Density: 103/km^{2} (267/sq mi)
- Time zone: UTC+01:00 (CET)
  - Summer (DST): UTC+02:00 (CEST)
- Postal code: 31530
- ^{1} French Land Register data, which excludes lakes, ponds, glaciers > 1 km^{2} (0.386 sq mi or 247 acres) and river estuaries.

Lasserre (French pronunciation: [lasɛʁ]; Occitan: La Sèrra) is a former commune in the Haute-Garonne department in southwestern France. On 1 January 2018, it was merged into the new commune of Lasserre-Pradère.

== Population ==
Historical population
Year	Pop.	±% p.a.
1962	192	—
1968	213	+1.74%
1975	276	+3.77%
1982	465	+7.74%
1990	574	+2.67%
1999	647	+1.34%
2017	982	+2.35%
Source: EHESS and INSEE

== See also ==
- Communes of the Haute-Garonne department
