= Sears Roebuck Building (Knoxville) =

Historic building in Knoxville, Tennessee

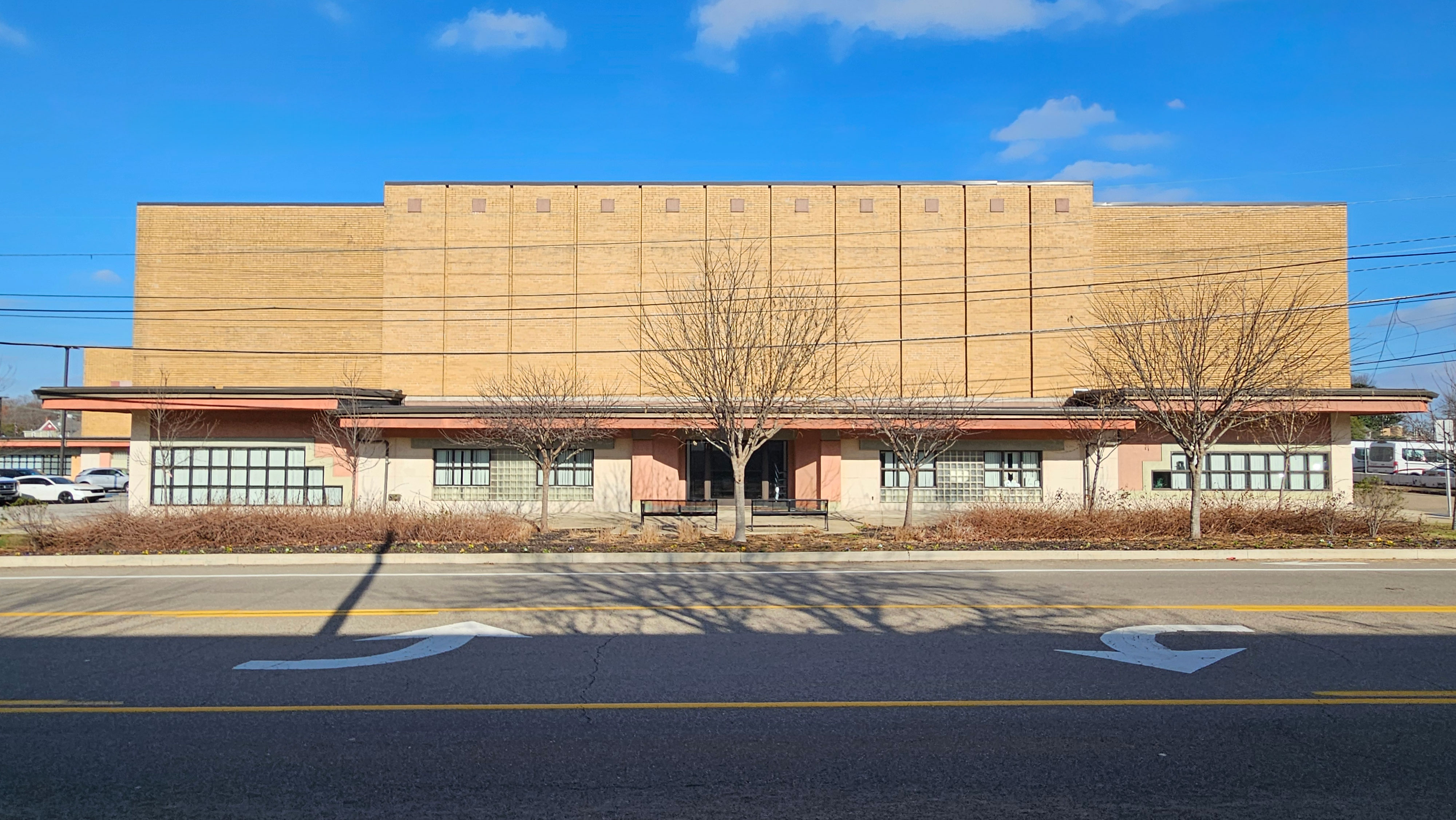
- Front facade of the Sears Roebuck Building
- Interactive map of Sears Roebuck Building
- 35°58′49″N 83°55′37″W

History
- Built: 1948

Site notes
- Architectural style: Art Deco
- Owner: Knox County

Sears Roebuck Building, also known as the Old Sears Building and the Knox County Central Building, is an office building in Knoxville, Tennessee, United States. It was initially constructed in 1948 for Sears, Roebuck & Company as a retail store.

== History ==
The building stands on a site that previously hosted a local baseball games and the old North Knoxville School, both of which were demolished before construction began. Built between 1946 and 1948, it became the first major department store located outside Downtown Knoxville and featured the largest free parking lot in the city at that time.

The store represented Sears' first relocation from its former Gay Street location in downtown Knoxville. The original design included marble floors, escalators, and a free shuttle to Gay Street.

In April 1949, country singer Maybelle Carter, her teenage daughter June Carter, and guitarist Chet Atkins held a record-signing event at the store.

The store closed in 1984 after the opening of Sears' West Town Mall location, which became the company's primary Knoxville store. In 1991, the building underwent renovation for use by the Knox County School System as office and warehouse space. Renovations included a long strip of glass blocks on two sides of the building.

As of 2025, the building houses Knox County Records Management, Purchasing and Veterans Services.

== In popular culture ==
The building appears in Richard Marius’s final novel An Affair of Honor (2001), which is partly set in Knoxville in the 1950s. The narrator writes:

"Sears, Roebuck [sic] had moved out to a large store a couple of miles away from the center of town. It was an ugly, flat building with an enourmous parking lot."

Later, a character, Jane Whitaker, describes it as a place of “diabolical ugliness”.
