= Turku Centre for Computer Science =

Finnish research department

Turku Centre for Computer Science (abbr. TUCS, Finnish: Turun tietotekniikan tutkimus- ja koulutuskeskus, Swedish: Åbo datatekniska forsknings- och utbildningscentrum) is a joint department of University of Turku and Åbo Akademi University. TUCS was founded on March 21, 1994. The mission of TUCS is to coordinate the education, research and societal interaction of the affiliate Universities in the field of ICT. The TUCS office facilities are located in Turku in the Turku Science Park area.

== Departments involved in TUCS ==
=== University of Turku ===
Faculty of Mathematics and Natural Sciences

- Department of Information Technology.
- Department of Mathematics and Statistics

Turku School of Economics

- The Institute of Information Systems Sciences

=== Åbo Akademi University ===
Faculty of Natural Sciences and Technology

- Computer Science
- Computer Engineering

Faculty of Social Sciences, Business and Economics

- Information Systems

== Organization ==
Turku Centre for Computer Science coordinates education and research Computer Science (understood in a broad sense) in Turku. TUCS is governed by a board. The Director of TUCS is Prof. Ion Petre.

TUCS has been a Center of Excellence of Research of the Academy of Finland in the very first round of such centers in Finland, 1995–1999. A unit of TUCS, the Centre for Reliable Software Technology (CREST), has also been a Center of Excellence during 2002–2007. Two Academy Professors, as well as three FIDIPRO professors have been / are affiliated with TUCS.

The research in TUCS is focused on TUCS Research Programmes. Currently the research programmes are:

- Combinatorics, Complex Systems and Computability (Com^{3}) - director Prof. Jarkko Kari
- From Computational Biology and Medical Informatics to Health and Wellbeing (BioHealth) - directors Prof. Tapio Salakoski and Prof. Ion Petre
- Resilient IT Infrastructures (RITES) - directors Prof. Ivan Porres and Dr. Juha Plosila
- Turku Information Systems Research Alliance (TISRA) - directors Prof. Emer. Christer Carlsson and Prof. Jukka Heikkilä

The research is carried out in 17 research units.

TUCS organises the TUCS Distinguished Lecture Series, a forum for public lectures delivered by outstanding national and international scientists and innovators in all aspects of computing. They come from diverse backgrounds from academia, as well as from industry. The purpose is to facilitate contacts between young scientists and top research groups as well as inform and inspire wider audiences about recent developments and future visions in ICT-related theory and practice. The lectures are recorded and published on YouTube channel.

TUCS coordinates the master- and doctoral-level education in computer science, computer engineering, mathematics, and information systems between the two universities in Turku, helping to provide the educational programs of both universities to all students. This is made possible by the joint campus of the two universities.

== Cooperation with other universities and colleges ==
TUCS is an affiliate partner of EIT ICT Labs of the European Institute of Innovation and Technology.

TUCS is a member of the European Education Forum (abbr. EEF). There are seven research centers in EEF in Denmark, Netherlands, Finland, Italy, Germany and United Kingdom.

TUCS is a member of the Finnish statewide INFORTE-programme for ICT professionals, which is designed to offer networking and education events to professionals working in Finnish companies, polytechnics and public administration.
