= Seir =

Seir or SEIR may refer to:

- Mount Seir, a mountainous region stretching between the Dead Sea and the Gulf of Aqaba
- Seir the Horite, chief of the Horites, a people mentioned in the Torah
- Sa'ir, also Seir, a Palestinian town in the Hebron Governorate in the West Bank
- Seir, a demon in the Ars Goetia
- Southeast Indian Ridge (SEIR), is a mid-ocean ridge in the southern Indian Ocean
- SEIR model, a compartmental model in epidemiology
- Single-engine instrument rating, an aircraft pilot qualification

== See also ==
- Sear (disambiguation)
- Sere (disambiguation)
- Osiris, an Egyptian god
- Sah (god), in Egyptian mythology the deification of the constellation Orion
- Seri people, an indigenous group of the Mexican state of Sonora
