= The Seer (novel) =

2007 novel by David Stahler, Jr.

- The Seer
- Author: David Stahler Jr.
- Cover artist: Steve Stone
- Language: English
- Series: Truesight Trilogy
- Genre: Young adult, Science fiction novel
- Publisher: Eos Books
- Publication date: 2007
- Publication place: United States
- Media type: Print (hardback & paperback)
- Pages: 248
- ISBN: 978-0-06-052288-9 (first edition, hardcover)
- OCLC: 70251114
- LC Class: PZ7.S78246 Lif 2007
- Preceded by: Truesight
- Followed by: Otherspace

The Seer is a young adult science fiction novel by David Stahler Jr. It is the second book in the Truesight trilogy, followed by Otherspace.

== Plot ==
After leaving Harmony, Jacob follows the trail to find Delaney Carrow, a girl presumed dead. By homing in on Delaney's sounder, he meets Xander, an ex-mercenary for the Mixel corporation. Xander initially gives Jacob a hard time, but as the weeks pass, he warms to her, calling her "Blinder." Jacob, once again homing in on Delaney's sounder, discovers that Xander has it. Upon confronting Xander with a kitchen knife, he learns that Xander gave Delaney a ride and left her on Mixel's doorstep. Desperate, Jacob pleads with Xander to take him to Melville to see if he can find Delaney. Initially hesitant, Xander eventually agrees and takes him to Mixel Tower. Once there, they find that Delaney has become a pop star and that she has been given artificial eyes so that she can see. But Delaney is not happy. In truth, she is a prisoner in the tower, and Jacob hatches a plan with Xander to free her from Mixel.

Later, Jacob starts having visions, first about Delaney and Harmony. Eventually, bits and pieces of these visions come true, and he realizes that he can see future events. With this new power, he gets his companions out of difficult situations. One night, he has a vision of a boy telling him that there is a colony of people like him out there - Blinders turned Seers. However, the message becomes garbled before Jacob can hear the location of the colony, so Jacob decides to revisit Harmony to find answers.

Upon returning to Harmony, Jacob and Delaney pay a visit to the high councilor's house, where Delaney tells her father of her return. The high councilor tries to strangle her but is presumably killed by Jacob, and she escapes while Jacob heads to the ghostbox. He asks the ghostbox if there are other people like him out there. The ghostbox tells Jacob that there are others like him: people who were born blind and have gained the ability to see (called "abominations" by the ghostbox), who were supposed to be killed rather than simply having their sight taken away as Jacob believed before. Jacob then proceeds to ask the ghostbox where the other escaped Seers might be and discovers from the machine that they could be on the colony of Tieresias. Eventually, he is detected by listeners who chase him throughout Harmony. They fail to catch him, and he and his companions make a hasty escape away from the colony.

== Reception ==
According to Kirkus Reviews, the novel's overlay "between metaphorical and genuine blindness is so heavy-handed as to lead to occasional inappropriate linkages between the two. Luckily, it’s only blindness that Stahler handles ham-handedly, and this volume of Jacob’s trilogy focuses on non–vision-related themes."
