= Mary Sears =

Mary Sears may refer to:

- Mary Sears, birth name of Mary Sears McHenry (1834–1912) American community organizer
- Mary Sears (oceanographer) (1905–1997), United States Naval Reserve officer and oceanographer
  - USNS Mary Sears (T-AGS-65), a 2001 United States Navy oceanographic survey ship named after her
- Mary Sears (swimmer) (born 1939), American swimmer
