= Leake Street =

Road tunnel in Lambeth, London

Coordinates: 51.5020°N 0.1157°W

- Banksy Tunnel
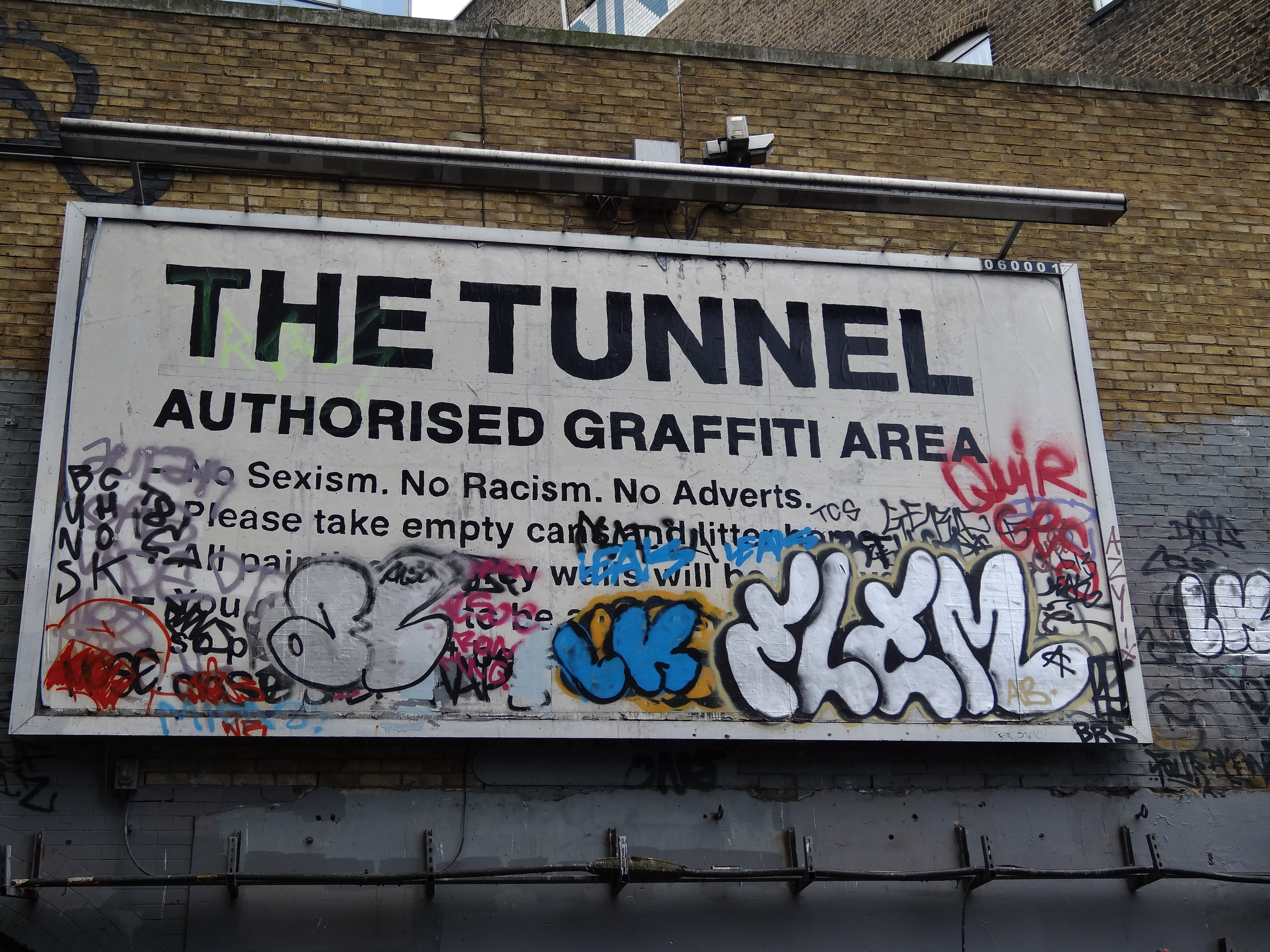
- A sign at the entrance to the tunnel informing the public about its use
- Interactive map of Leake Street
- Former name: York Street
- Area: Waterloo
- Location: Lambeth, London
- Postal code: SE1 7NN
- Nearest metro station: Waterloo station

Leake Street (also known as the Banksy Tunnel) is a road tunnel in Lambeth, London where graffiti is legal and promoted despite the fact that it is against UK law on public property. The street is about 300 metres long, runs off York Road and under the platforms and tracks of Waterloo station.

The walls are decorated with graffiti, initially created during the Cans Festival organised by Banksy on 3–5 May 2008. The festival ran again on the August Bank Holiday weekend 2008.

While the Eurostar terminal was at Waterloo, the road was open for through vehicular traffic. On 14 November 2008 ownership of the road passed from Eurostar to Network Rail and through traffic was restricted to pedestrians.

Prior to the 1920s the street was known as York Street.

== Gallery ==
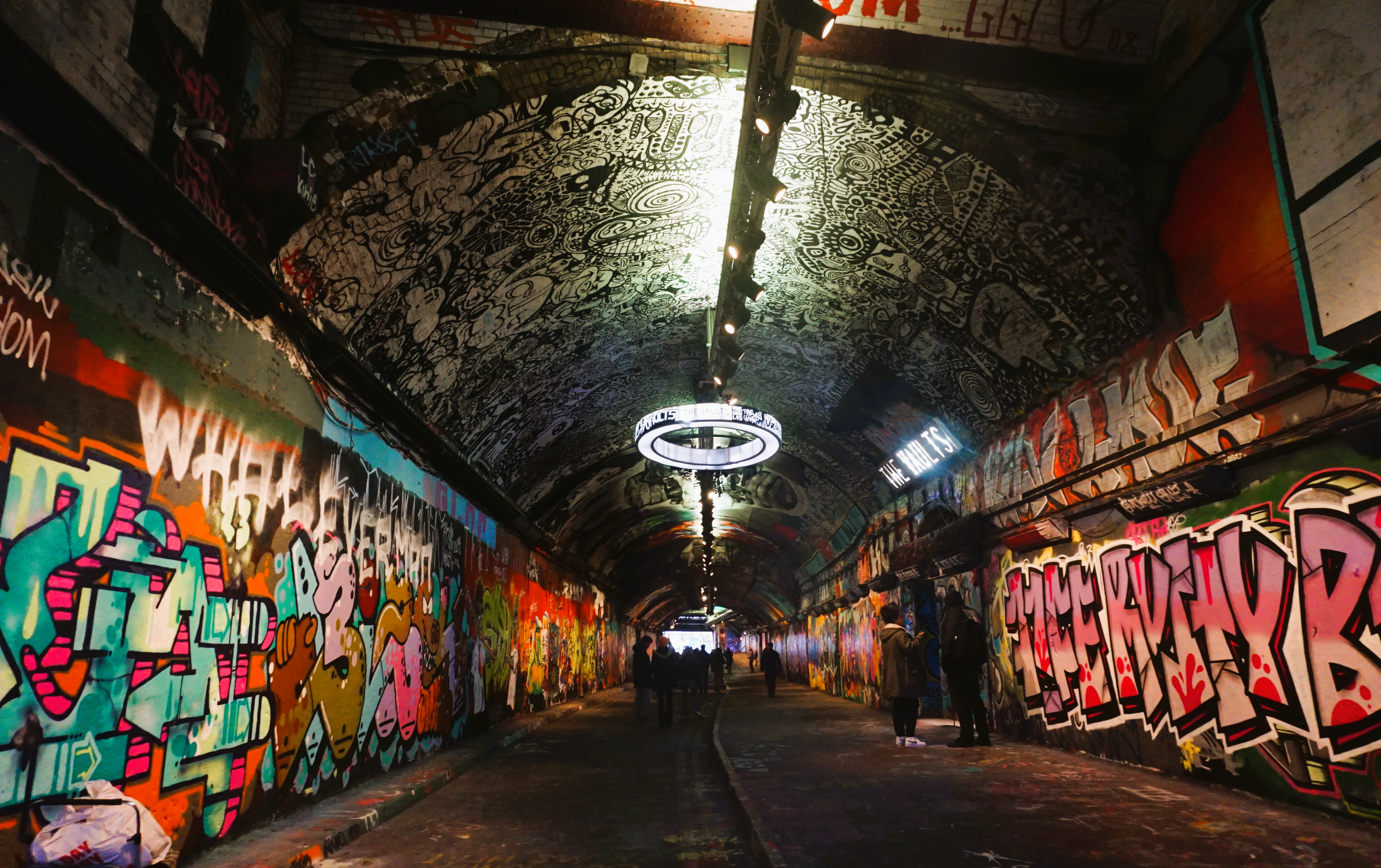
Leake Street tunnel. 2023

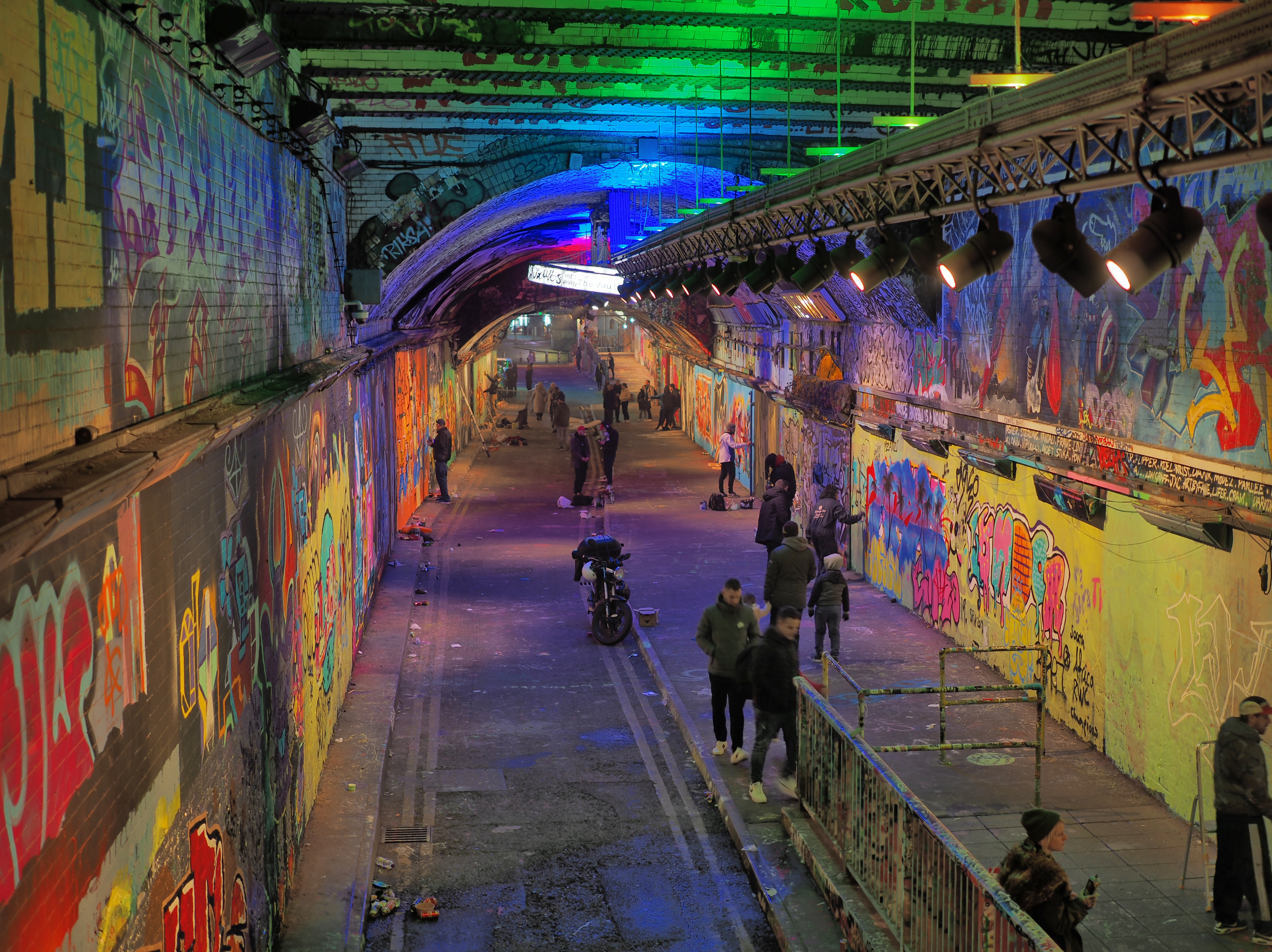
Leake Street tunnel. 2019

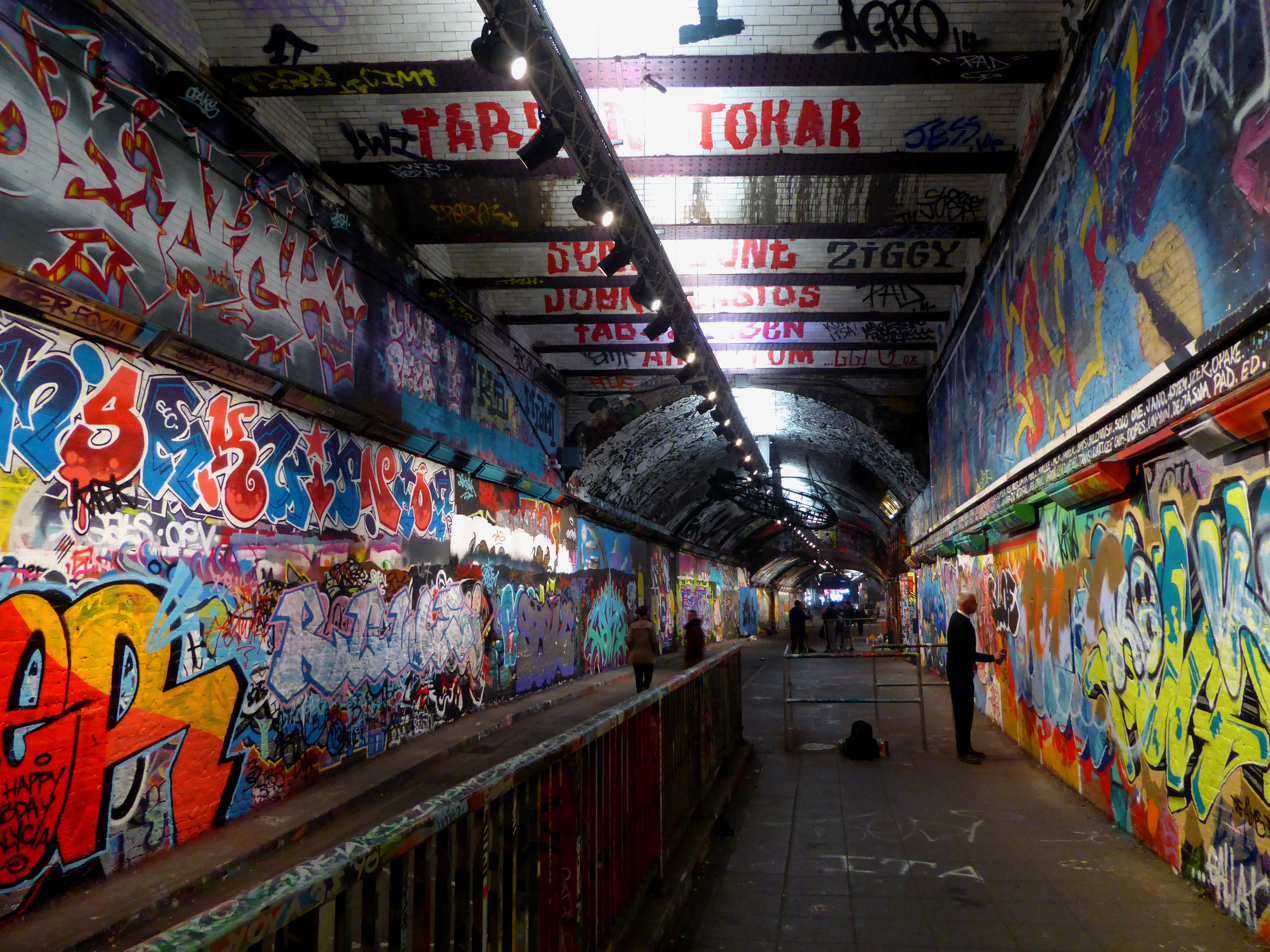
Leake Street tunnel. 2018

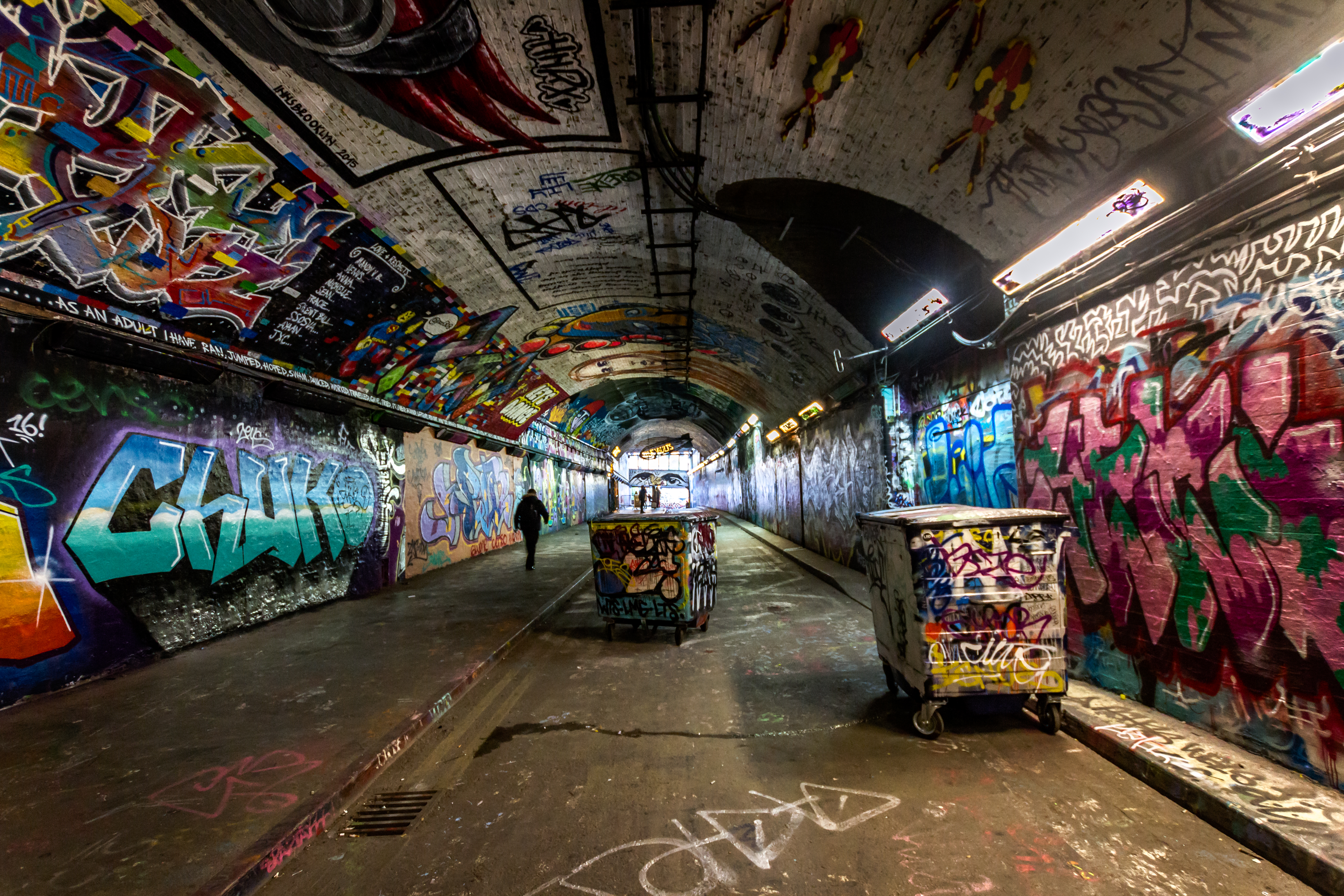
Leake Street tunnel. 2016

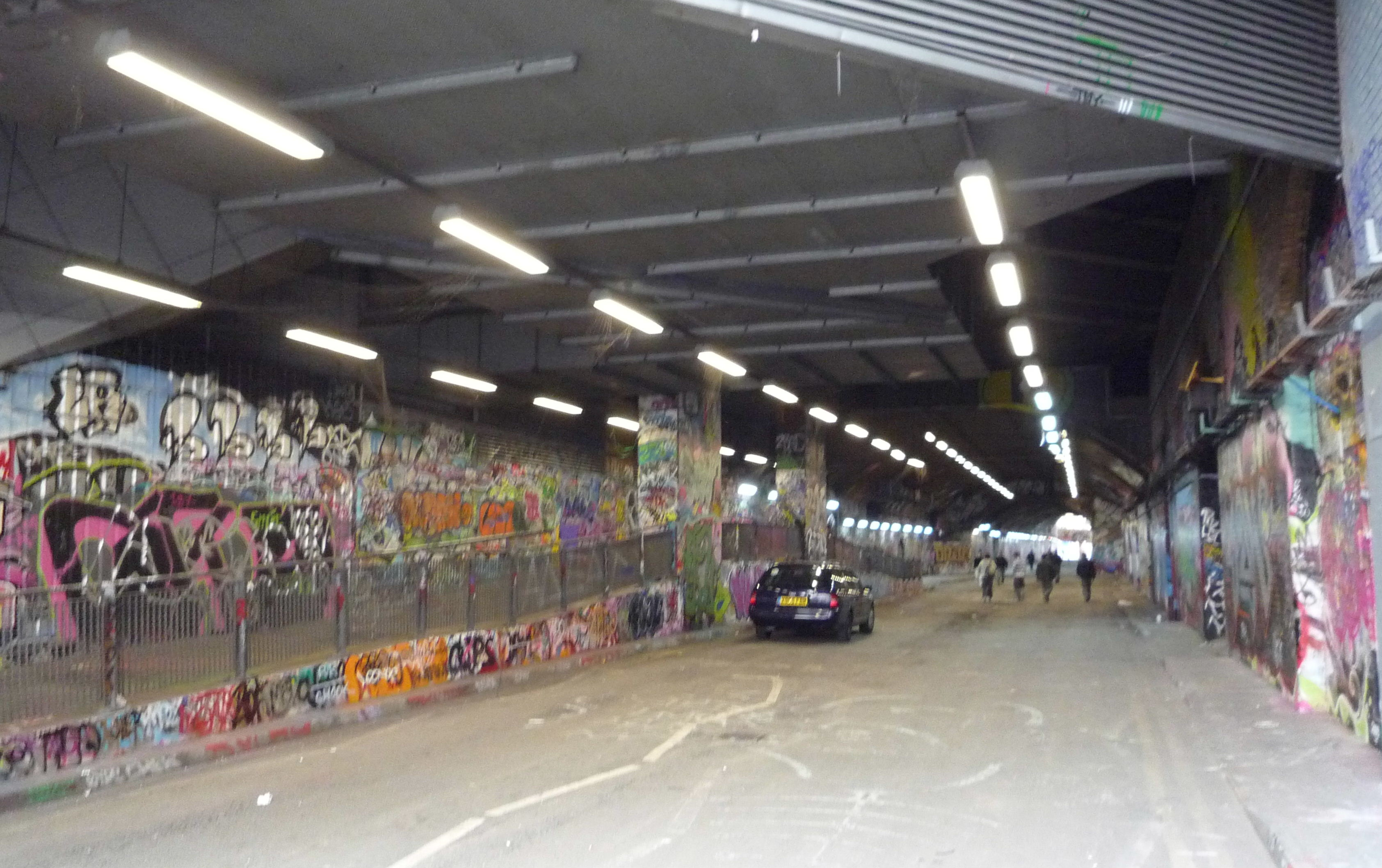
Leake Street tunnel. 2009

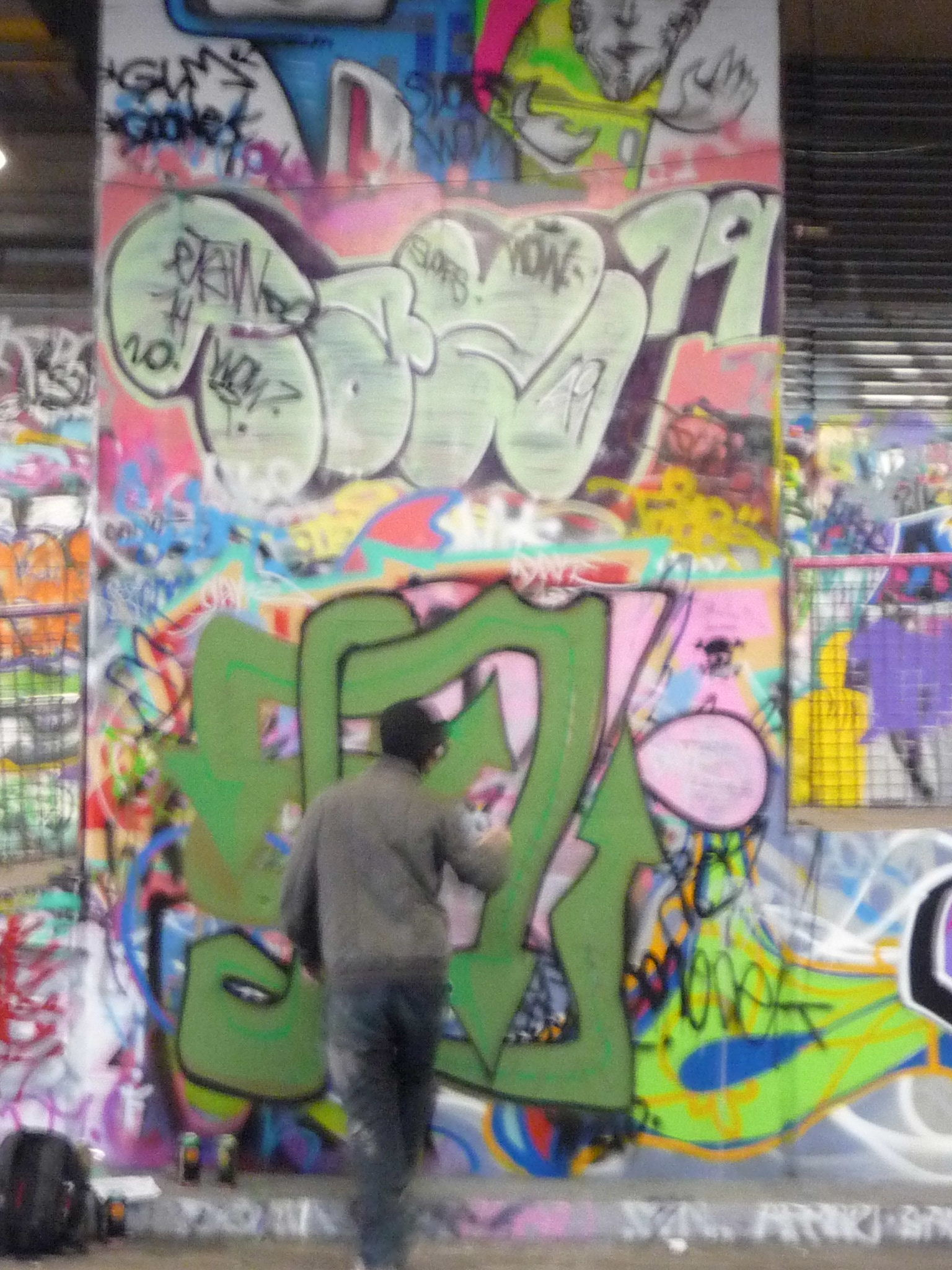
A graffiti artist in the Leake Street tunnel. 2009

== See also ==
- Graffiti in the United Kingdom
