= Samuel E. Squires =

American politician

Samuel Squires

Member of the Wisconsin State Assembly
- In office 1942–1948

Personal details
- Born: September 27, 1882 Iowa
- Died: July 25, 1967 (aged 84)
- Party: Republican

Military service
- Branch/service: United States Army
- Rank: Captain
- Battles/wars: World War I

Samuel E. Squires (September 27, 1882 – July 25, 1967) was an American politician who served as a member of the Wisconsin State Assembly.

== Background ==
Squires was born in Iowa. During World War I, he served in the United States Army, achieving the rank of captain.

Squires was a Republican. He was elected to the Wisconsin State Assembly from 1942 to 1948. During his career as an assemblyman, he was a member of a group of northern Wisconsin legislators known as the "Woodchoppers," who favored reintroducing bounties on wolves and other predators. In addition to serving in the Assembly, he was town chairman of Mason, Wisconsin and a member of the Bayfield County Board.
