= Single-ended recuperative burner =

A single-ended recuperative (SER) burner is a type of gas burner used in high-temperature industrial kilns and furnaces. These burners are used where indirect heating is required, e.g. where the products of combustion are not allowed to combine with the atmosphere of the furnace. The typical design is a tubular (pipe) shape with convoluted pathways on the interior, closed on the end pointed into the furnace. A gas burner fires a flame down the center of these pathways, and the hot combustion gases are then forced to change direction and travel along the shell of the tube, heating it to incandescent temperatures and allowing efficient transfer of thermal energy to the furnace interior. Exhaust gas is collected back at the burner end where it is eventually discharged to the atmosphere. The hot exhaust can be used to pre-heat the incoming combustion air and fuel gas (recuperation) to boost efficiency.

Such burners compete with electrical heating and can be more economical to operate than electric heat, particularly in larger furnaces and in most areas where the price of natural gas per unit of available energy is lower than that of electricity.

These particular furnaces are claimed to have a significant increase in efficiency over other types of furnaces, and are said to achieve efficiency up to 80 percent and higher.
