= Åbo Akademi University =

Finnish university

Coordinates: 60°27′14″N 22°16′43″E

- Åbo Akademi
- Latin: Academia Aboensis
- Type: Public
- Established: 1918; 108 years ago
- Affiliations: Coimbra Group
- Chancellor: Carl G. Gahmberg
- Rector: Mikael Lindfelt
- Administrative staff: 1,100
- Students: 5,500
- Location: Turku, Vaasa, Finland
- Campus: Urban
- Language: Swedish
- Colours: Red and yellow
- Website: www.abo.fi/en/

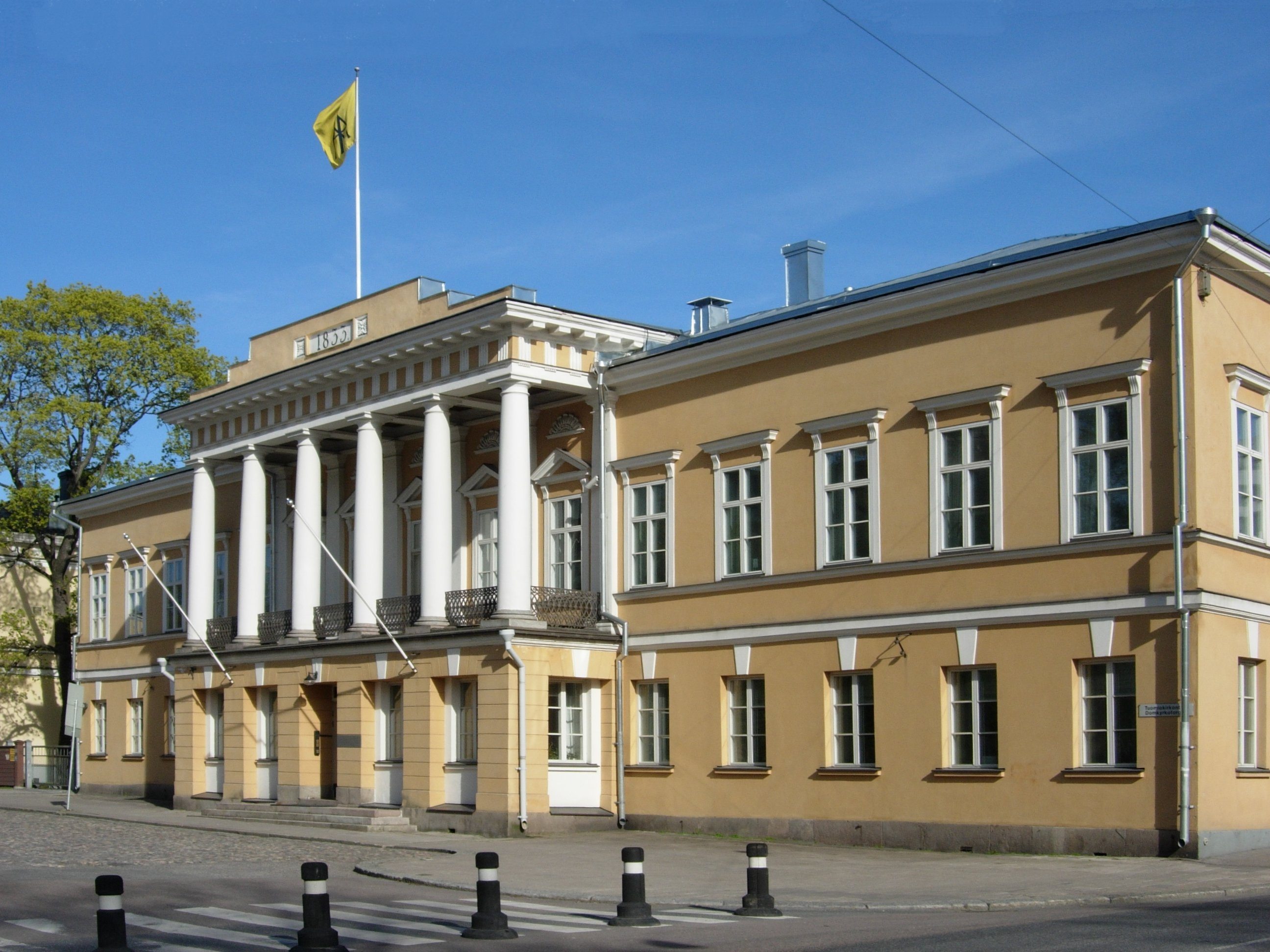
The main building at Åbo Akademi University.

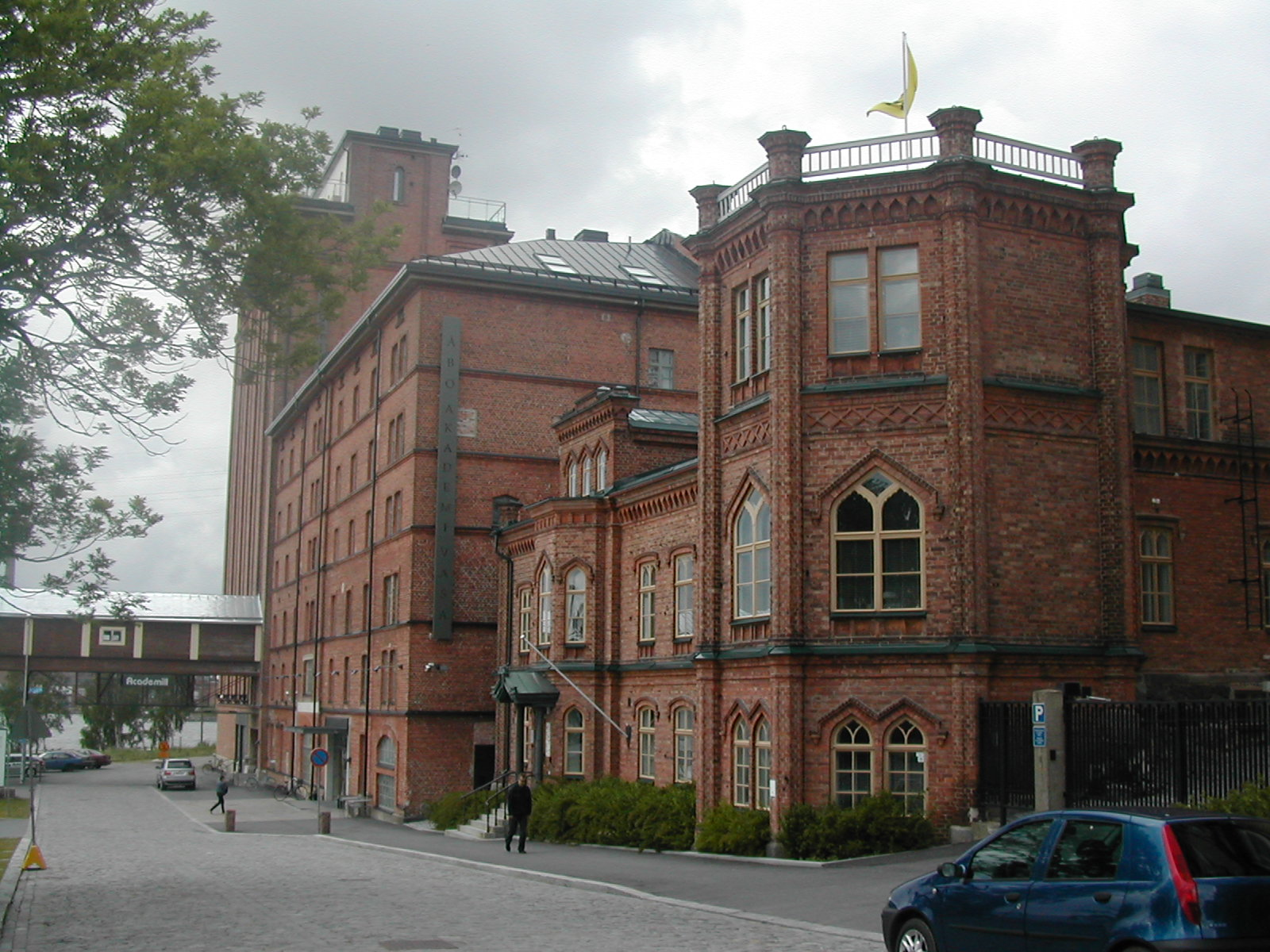
Åbo Akademi in Vaasa.

Åbo Akademi University (Swedish: Åbo Akademi, [ˈoːbu ɑkɑdeˈmiː]) is the only exclusively Swedish language multi-faculty university in Finland (or anywhere outside Sweden). It is located mainly in Turku (Åbo is the Swedish name of the city) but has also activities in Vaasa. Åbo Akademi should not be confused with the Royal Academy of Åbo, which was founded in 1640, but moved to Helsinki after the Turku fire of 1827 and is today known as the University of Helsinki.

Åbo Akademi was founded by private donations in 1918 as the third university in Finland, both to let Turku again become a university town and because it was felt that the Swedish language was threatened at the University of Helsinki. The Finnish University of Turku was founded in 1920, also by private donations and for similar reasons. Åbo Akademi was a private institution until 1981, when it was turned into a public institution.

University rankings

Global – Overall
- QS World: =643 (2026)

As the only uni-lingually Swedish multi-faculty university in the world outside Sweden and consequently the only one in Finland, Åbo Akademi University is responsible for higher education for a large proportion of the Swedish-speaking population. This role has many implications for education and research as well as for the social environment. As there are few students in most subjects, cooperation between faculties and with other universities is very important.

A minority of students are Finnish speakers who have passed a university entrance Swedish language test. While Turku itself is a bilingual city, the university provides a strong Swedish environment. Most of the students, regardless of their original language, will be functionally bilingual when finishing their studies.

== Organisation ==
After reorganization approved in February 2025, the university consists of two faculties:

- Faculty of Human and Social Sciences, with departments:
  - Business and Economics and Law (Turku)
  - Humanities (Turku)
  - Education (Vaasa)
  - Social Sciences (Turku)
- Faculty of Science and Engineering, with departments:
  - Natural and Health Sciences (Turku)
  - Engineering and Information Technology (Turku)

In addition, there are several other units and joint programs, such as:

- Language Centre
- Centre for Lifelong Learning
- Donner Institute for Research in Religious and Cultural History
- Institute of Human Rights
- Turku PET Centre (jointly run by the University of Turku, Åbo Akademi and the Turku University Hospital)
- Turku Centre for Computer Science (TUCS) (in co-operation with the University of Turku, among others)
- Turku Centre for Biotechnology (in co-operation with the University of Turku, among others)
- Vasa övningsskola, located in Vaasa, is the normal school of the teacher training programme.

While the university turned into a public institution, the foundation Stiftelsen för Åbo Akademi remained. Besides maintaining many of the university buildings, it is also a significant donor.

== Notable people ==
=== Alumni ===
- Di Wei, research fellow at the University of Cambridge

=== Rectors ===
The following people have served as rectors of Åbo Akademi:

- 1918–1921: Edvard Westermarck
- 1921–1929: Severin Johansson
- 1929–1936: Otto Andersson
- 1936–1942: Rolf Pipping
- 1942–1950: Georg Olof Rosenqvist
- 1950–1957: Lars Erik Taxell
- 1957–1962: Sven Lindman
- 1962–1966: Oscar Nikula
- 1966–1969: Nils Erik Enkvist
- 1969–1975: Karl-Gustav Fogel
- 1975–1978: Kurt Nyholm
- 1978–1982: Bill Widén
- 1982–1988: Caj-Gunnar Lindström
- 1988–1997: Bengt Stenlund
- 1997–2005: Gustav Björkstrand
- 2006–2014: Jorma Mattinen
- 2015–2019: Mikko Hupa
- 2019–1 November 2021: Moira von Wright
- 2022–4 April 2025: Mikael Lindfelt
- 4 April 2025–present: (Acting Rector) Gunilla Widén

== See also ==
- Education in Finland
- List of modern universities in Europe (1801–1945)
