= Arnstein & Lehr =

American law firm

Arnstein & Lehr, LLP
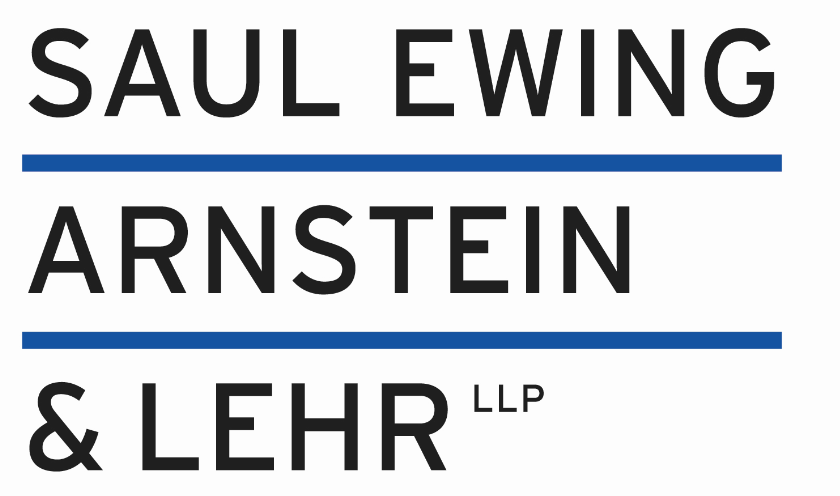
- Headquarters: 161 North Clark Street, Suite 4200; Chicago, Illinois
- No. of offices: 9
- No. of attorneys: approximately 150
- Major practice areas: General practice
- Date founded: 1893
- Founder: Albert Henry Loeb, and Sidney Adler
- Company type: Limited liability partnership

Arnstein & Lehr was a national law firm founded in Chicago in 1893, with offices in Chicago and Springfield, Illinois; Milwaukee, Wisconsin; and Boca Raton, Fort Lauderdale, Miami, Tampa, and West Palm Beach, Florida. The firm represented business enterprises in significant legal victories in the United States and Puerto Rico. Its representation of Sears, Roebuck and Co. since 1895 is one of the country's longest continuous attorney-client relationships. On September 1, 2017, Arnstein & Lehr, LLP combined with Saul Ewing to form Saul Ewing Arnstein & Lehr, LLP with 14 offices and over 400 attorneys.

== History ==
In 1893, Albert Henry Loeb and Sydney Adler founded a law partnership specializing in corporate and real estate law, known as Loeb & Adler, with offices in room 903 of the Chamber of Commerce Building on the southeast corner of LaSalle and Washington Streets in Chicago. In 1895, the firm handled the reorganization of Sears and the entry into the company of Julius Rosenwald and Aaron Nusbaum. Albert Henry Loeb was retained to draft the reorganization documents giving equal ownership to Rosenwald and Nusbaum with Richard Warren Sears and incorporating the company in Illinois.

By 1898 the firm's clients included the State Bank of Chicago, Security Title & Trust Company, the Sheriff of Cook County, and all the judges of the Circuit Court of Cook County and Superior Court of Cook County. In 1902 the firm represented the Coliseum Garden Company “to provide music and high class vaudeville entertainment.”

Albert Henry Loeb resigned from the firm in 1903 to become a full-time executive for Sears. In 1923, United States Senator James Hamilton Lewis, who had lost a re-election bid, joined the firm as a partner, and his name was included in the firm name. To begin his successful bid to regain his seat in the Senate, he resigned from the firm in 1927. In 1929, Lucy Mae Viner, one of the earliest women lawyers in the city, became an associate, and then in 1934 the firm's first woman partner, listed as L. M. Varner. The firm represented Kroehler Manufacturing Company, Rudolph Wurlitzer Co., Lady Esther Company, The Edgewater Beach Hotel, Lloyd A Fry Roofing Co., Johnson Controls, Inc. and Navistar. By 1970, the firm was outside General Counsel for five New York Stock Exchange Companies, DeSoto, Roper Corporation, Sears Roebuck & Co., Universal-Rundle Corporation and Whirlpool Corporation.

After several changes in name to reflect the changing membership, the firm eventually, in 1988, became Arnstein & Lehr, LLP. The firm was then located in the Sears Tower and subsequently moved to its present location at 120 South Riverside Plaza, Chicago.

== Notable cases ==
=== Sears Tower litigation ===
On March 28, 1972, as construction of the building neared the 50th storey, the state's attorney of neighboring Lake County brought suit against Sears, Roebuck and Co. in the name of the People of the State of Illinois to halt construction and limit the height of the building, claiming that the completed building would interfere with television reception to the north and west of Chicago. Shortly thereafter, on March 28, 1972, a similar suit was filed in Cook County by several Chicago suburbs. The firm defended the lawsuits and won both of them in the trial courts. On June 6, 1972, Lake County appealed and because of the importance of the litigation the suits were consolidated, the Appellate Courts were by-passed and the matter went directly to the Supreme Court of Illinois. The suit by the Chicago suburbs was subsequently added. On June 30, 1972, the Supreme Court entered a letter order upholding the decision of the trial courts to permit the construction as planned and followed it with a written opinion on September 20, 1972.

=== Japanese Electronic Products antitrust litigation – MDL189 ===
(Zenith Radio Corporation v. Matsushita Electric Industrial Co.)

In the 1970s, one of this country's largest and most complex antitrust suits began when an antitrust and dumping suit was filed in 1972 in New Jersey by National Union Electric Corp. against many of its Japanese competitors, alleging a conspiracy to destroy the United States television industry. In 1974, Zenith Radio Corporation filed a similar suit seeking $900,000,000.00 in Philadelphia federal court against the same defendants and added Motorola and Sears as co-conspirators. The suits were consolidated for trial in the United States District Court in Philadelphia. The firm defended Sears. The suit first made legal history in 1980 when the U.S. Court of Appeals for the Third Circuit ruled that a plaintiff does not have an absolute right to a trial by jury in a civil case. Subsequently, the defendants, including Sears, filed motions for Summary Judgment on both the antitrust and dumping claims. After summer long hearings on a daily basis to determine what evidence could be considered on the Summary Judgment Motions, Judge Edward R. Becker entered summary judgment for all defendants on both claims and dismissed what was then a $1,500,000,000.00 lawsuit. Plaintiffs appealed and the Third Circuit Court of Appeals reversed the summary judgments for all the defendants, but affirmed the decision for Sears and two other defendants. The Supreme Court of the United States later reinstated the summary judgments for the Japanese defendants.

=== Adamo Wrecking Co. ===
In 1977, the firm handled a case involving regulations promulgated by the Environmental Protection Agency under the Clean Air Act that went as far as the Supreme Court of the United States. In the early 1970s, the Environmental Protection Agency promulgated a “National Emission Standard for Asbestos” and specified a certain procedure to be followed in the demolition of buildings containing asbestos but did not limit asbestos emissions that occur during a demolition. The National Association of Demolition Contractors retained the firm to defend criminal charges brought against member demolition contractors throughout the country for violation of what the government termed an “emission standard.”

One such indictment was returned on February 20, 1973, in the federal court in Detroit, Michigan, against Adamo Wrecking Co. The district court trial judge agreed with the firm that the regulation was not an “emission standard” but rather a “work rule” the violation of which was not a criminal offense. On appeal, the Sixth Circuit Court of Appeals reversed the district court on the basis it did not have jurisdiction to review the validity of the standard in a criminal proceeding.

The firm petitioned the Supreme Court of the United States to grant certiorari to review the ruling, and the Court did. On January 10, 1978, the Supreme Court in a 5 to 4 decision, first ruled that the District Court did have jurisdiction to determine the validity of the EPA regulation in a criminal proceeding and then upheld the decision of the District Court that the regulation was not an “emission standard” rather than a “work rule” which a failure to follow was not a criminal activity.

=== Dupont Plaza Hotel arson ===
In San Juan, Puerto Rico, on New Year's Eve in 1986, 97 people perished and over 200 were injured in a fire which spread through the hotel and casino after being set by disgruntled employees in a vacant ballroom. Within a few months 2,300 plaintiffs had filed 264 separate lawsuits in Puerto Rico and throughout the United States seeking $1,800,000.00 in damages.

The judicial panel for Multidistrict Litigation transferred these related cases to San Juan, Puerto Rico, for discovery and subsequently for trial against approximately 230 defendants. The United States 1st Circuit Court of Appeals called this litigation “a litigatory monster.” The trial court divided the lawsuit into three trial phases. All of the defendants in the first trial phase settled. The second trial phase dealt with product liability defendants and suppliers to the hotel.

The case was tried in a specially built federal courtroom in a vacant hotel in Hato Ray, Puerto Rico. The attorneys for Plaintiffs and Defendants were each given floor for offices and conference rooms. Over objection by the defendants, the court allowed live satellite testimony beamed into the courtroom from various locations in the United States.

ne of the defendants was Johnson Controls, Inc. of Milwaukee defended by the firm. Plaintiffs claimed that Johnson Controls sold and installed an energy management system that failed to give an early warning of the fire. After nine months of trial, Johnson Controls was one of only three defendants to receive a directed verdict at the close of the plaintiffs’ case.

When this trial phase was completed, there was approximately $220,908,549.00 accumulated in a settlement fund for the plaintiffs as a result of the various settlement agreements and a jury verdict against some of the defendants.
