= Albert Henry Loeb =

American lawyer

Albert Henry Loeb (February 18, 1868 – October 27, 1924) was a Chicago attorney and the former vice president and treasurer of Sears, Roebuck and Co. Loeb was the brother of Jacob Loeb, the former president of the Chicago Board of Education and was also the father of convicted murderer Richard Albert Loeb of the infamous Leopold and Loeb.

== Early years ==
Albert Henry Loeb was born to a Jewish family in Rockford, Illinois. Loeb married Anna H. Bohnen on April 26, 1894. The couple settled in the Kenwood neighborhood on Chicago's south side and had four sons: Allan, Ernest, Richard, and Thomas. In addition to their Kenwood mansion, Loeb built a summer estate for the family called Loeb Farms in 1918, in Charlevoix, Michigan. Part of the property was purchased from the Loebs in 1962, was renamed Castle VanHaver and hosted an art gallery. It was again sold in 1969 and was renamed Castle Farms.

== Career ==
Loeb did not attend law school. Rather, he was admitted to the bar by examination in 1889, a common practice at the time. In 1893, Loeb and Sydney Adler founded their law partnership in Chicago, Illinois, which specialized in corporate and real estate law. The firm is now known as Saul Ewing Arnstein & Lehr, LLP.

In 1895, Sears Roebuck and Co. became a client of Loeb & Adler when Aaron Nusbaum and Richard Warren Sears retained the firm to draft reorganization documents, which gave ½ of the stock to Richard Sears and ½ to Rosenwald and Nusbaum and, on September 7, 1895, incorporated the company in Illinois as Sears, Roebuck and Co. of Illinois. Loeb was given four shares of stock, two from each of the sides, which would enable him to break a tie vote should the occasion arise. Loeb, remaining with the Firm of Loeb & Adler, became general counsel of the new company. In 1901 Loeb left the practice of law and became the corporate secretary of Sears, Roebuck and Co. In 1908 Loeb was appointed vice president and treasurer of Sears. Loeb and Julius Rosenwald, the Chairman of Sears, maintained a close relationship throughout their professional lives. It has been said that Rosenwald never made an important decision without asking Loeb's advice.

== Leopold and Loeb murder trial ==
On May 21, 1924, Loeb's second son Richard, and Richard's friend Nathan Leopold, kidnapped and killed Bobby Franks, a 14-year-old neighborhood boy. Upon his son's arrest, the elder Loeb contacted attorney Charles Lederer, who was a member of Loeb's former law firm and active in Chicago politics. Lederer, who maintained a personal friendship with the Cook County District Attorney, requested on Loeb's behalf that the D.A. release Richard Loeb, but the request was refused. The Loeb family considered retaining Lederer and Lederer's law partner (and former U.S. Senator) J. Hamilton Lewis to defend Leopold and Loeb since both were well-known Chicago trial lawyers. However, the firm declined due to the relationship with the elder Loeb and client Sears, Roebuck and Co. Instead, the Loeb family retained Clarence Darrow.

Albert Loeb had suffered an initial heart attack a few days before the murder of Bobby Franks and remained in poor health. He accordingly retired to the family's Charlevoix estate and remained there in seclusion during the period of the trial. During his enforced absence Loeb's brother Jacob and eldest son Allan represented the family, attending the court hearings while liaising with Darrow and other involved parties.

The elder Loeb made a partial recovery at Charlevoix and returned to Chicago shortly after the conclusion of the trial. However he died of a second heart attack on October 28, 1924, less than two months after his son Richard was sentenced to life plus ninety-nine years on September 10.
