= Castle Farms =

- Loeb Farms Barn Complex
- U.S. National Register of Historic Places
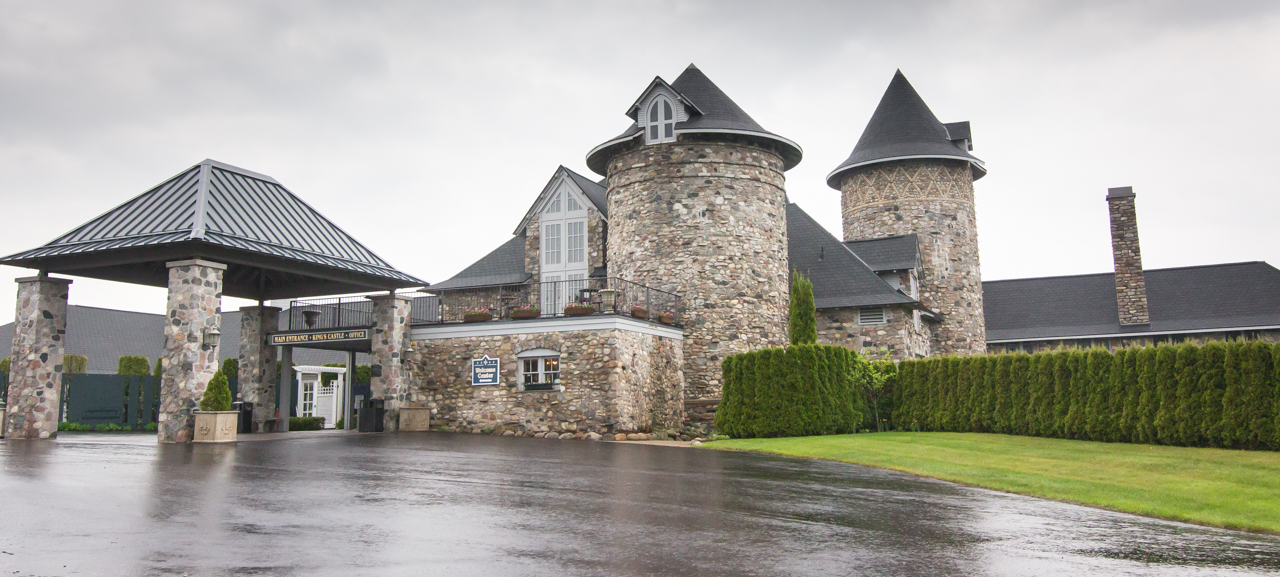

- Location within Michigan Location within the United States
- Interactive map
- Nearest city: Charlevoix, Michigan
- Coordinates: 45°16′43″N 85°13′46″W
- Area: 45 acres (18 ha)
- Built: 1917
- Architect: Arthur Heun
- Architectural style: Late 19th And 20th Century Revivals, Neo-Norman
- NRHP reference No.: 95001392
- Added to NRHP: November 29, 1995

Castle Farms is a special events facility located in Charlevoix, Michigan. It was constructed in 1918 by Albert Loeb, who was the Vice President of Sears, Roebuck and Company, and it was designed by Arthur Heun.

== History ==
Albert Loeb built Castle Farms as a model farm to showcase livestock in addition to new farm equipment that was sold by his company. The original estate covered 1600 acres, and included the Loebs's summer home, caretakers houses, fields, orchards, and a livestock barn complex. Loeb hired Chicago architect Arthur Heun to design the buildings on the estate, including the farm buildings. The architecture was inspired by French Normandy castles. During the farm's operation, Loeb bred prize-winning stock of Holstein-Friesian cattle, Duroc-Jersey hogs, and Belgian horses. The farm also established a premium-quality mail-order business in butter, syrup, honey, poultry, eggs, and other products. Albert Loeb died in 1924, but his son Ernest continued the farm for a few years until financial difficulties forced its closure in 1927.

After the farm ceased operations, the buildings remained in the Loeb family and were rented for storage space until 1962, when it was purchased by John Van Haver, an executive who restored the facility and opened it to the public. It was then sold to Arthur and Erwina Reibel in 1969, and from 1976 to 1996 the property became a popular venue for rock concerts. Some of the more notable acts to perform at Castle Farms include Aerosmith, Bon Jovi, Def Leppard, Metallica, AC/DC, Tina Turner, Ozzy Osbourne, and The Beach Boys, among others.

In 2001, Castle Farms was sold to current owner Linda Mueller who finished restoring it to its original condition by 2005. Today, it is open year-round, and is primarily used for weddings and receptions. However, Castle Farms is also used for other various festivals and social events, such as the Charlevoix Renaissance Festival. In 2008, a model railroad was added that provides a scenic journey through Charlevoix's history.

== Description ==
The original 1917/18 buildings at Castle Farms include seven structures: dairy barn, horse barn, blacksmith's shop, equipment shed, ice house, office, and cheese shop. They all have walls constructed from locally gathered fieldstone, and have high hip, conical, or pyramid roofs. The buildings are grouped into a horse barn complex and a dairy barn complex.

There was once a chicken coop on the property, which was torn down between 1943 and 1944. The wood was used to build a 4 bedroom cottage, beginning in the winter of 1944, and completed by August 1945, on Oyster Bay in Lake Charlevoix that still stands today.

The horse barn with its wagon sheds, the ice house, and the office form an open courtyard, facing the dairy barn. The blacksmith's shop, with a forge and massive chimney, sits next to the barn. The horse barn is a long rectangular structure with a high hip roof, pierced on both sides by dormers with pointed-arch windows. The wagon sheds, once open, have been enclosed. The icehouse is a windowless octagonal building standing at the corner of the courtyard. At the adjacent corner is the round office with a conical roof.

A rectangular, one-story, hip-roof building used as a cheese shop stands between the horse barn and dairy barn complexes. The dairy barn consists of a U-shaped cattle barn and a connected service wing with what was originally a dairy, a dormitory, a bunk house, a kitchen, and four round-plan silos. The barn consists of a high hip-roof section at the base of the U and lower gable-roof sections forming the legs. The barn has horizontal bands of square-head windows. The service wing has an arched gateway that leads to the courtyard against the dairy barn.
