= Alvah Curtis Roebuck =

American businessman, co-founder of Sears (1864–1948)

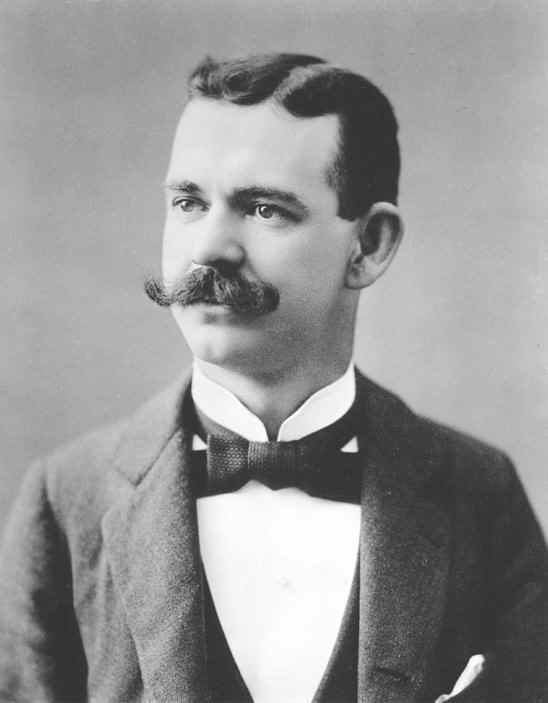
- Born: January 9, 1864; Lafayette, Indiana, U.S.
- Died: June 18, 1948 (aged 84); Evanston, Illinois, U.S.
- Resting place: Acacia Park Cemetery, Chicago, U.S.
- Occupation: Businessman
- Years active: 1891–1948
- Known for: Co-founder Sears, Roebuck & Co.
- Spouse: Sarah Blanche Lett
- Children: 3 (2 sons, 1 daughter)

Alvah Curtis Roebuck (January 9, 1864 – June 18, 1948) was an American retail businessman, who was one of the co-founders of department store Sears, Roebuck and Company with his partner Richard Warren Sears.

== Early life ==
Alvah Curtis Roebuck was born on January 9, 1864, in Lafayette, Indiana. He began work as a watchmaker in a Hammond, Indiana, jewelry store at age 12.

== Career ==
Roebuck co-founded Sears, Roebuck and Company with Richard Warren Sears in 1891.

In 1895, Roebuck asked Sears to buy him out for about $20,000. At Richard Sears's request, Roebuck took charge of a division that handled watches, jewelry, optical goods, and, later, phonographs, magic lanterns and motion picture machines. His business interests did not end with Sears. He later organized and financed two companies: a manufacturer and a distributor of motion picture machines and accessories. Roebuck also served as president (1909–1924) of Emerson Typewriter Company, where he invented the improved typewriter, called the "Woodstock."

After several years in semi-retirement in Florida, the financial losses he suffered in the stock market crash of 1929 forced Roebuck to return to Chicago. By 1933, Roebuck had rejoined Sears, Roebuck and Co., where he largely devoted his time to compiling a history of the company he helped found.

In September 1934, a Sears store manager asked Roebuck to make a public appearance at his store. After an enthusiastic public turnout, Roebuck went on tour, appearing at retail stores across the country for the next several years.

== Personal life and death ==
Roebuck married his first wife Kittie Rice on September 2, 1890, in York, Ontario, Canada, and had a son Theodore Roebuck, born 2 July 1891. Roebuck later married Sarah Blanche Lett. They lived in Tujunga, Los Angeles, California. They had a son, Alvah Curtis Roebuck Jr., born 27 April 1914, who also lived in Tujunga, and a daughter, Lucile May Roebuck, born 16 April 1902, who lived in Evanston, Illinois, with her husband Raymond Hiram Keeler.

Roebuck died on June 18, 1948, while visiting his daughter in Evanston, Illinois. He was 84 years old. He was entombed in a crypt at Acacia Park Cemetery in Chicago, Illinois.
