= Sears =

Department store chain in the United States

Sears, Roebuck and Co.

- Willis Tower (previously Sears Tower), corporate headquarters from 1973 to 1995.
- Trade name: Sears
- Type: Subsidiary (Formerly Public)
- Traded as: NYSE: S (1906–2005); DJIA component (1924–1999); S&P 100 component (until 2005); S&P 500 component (until 2005)
- Industry: Retail
- Founded: 1886 (140 years ago) as R.W. Sears Watch Company; 1892 (134 years ago); Chicago, Illinois, U.S.
- Founders: Richard Warren Sears; Alvah Curtis Roebuck
- Headquarters: Hoffman Estates, Illinois (originally Chicago, Illinois), U.S.
- Number of locations: 5 (2026)
- Area served: United States
- Products: Clothing; footwear; bedding; bath; furniture; jewelry; beauty products; electronics; appliances; housewares; tools; toys; auto repair
- Revenue: ▼US$16.702 billion (2017); ▼US$22.138 billion (2016)
- Operating income: ▼US$−0.430 billion (2017); ▼US$−$1.978 billion (2016)
- Parent: Sears Holdings (2005–2019); Transformco (2019–present)
- Subsidiaries: Kenmore; Craftsman (1927–2017); DieHard (1967–2019); Sears Puerto Rico (1937–2025); Sears Canada (1952–2018); Orchard Supply Hardware (1996–2012); The Great Indoors (1997–2012)
- Website: sears.com
- Footnotes; Financial data:^{,}

Sears, Roebuck and Co., commonly known as Sears (/sɪərz/ SEERZ), is an American chain of department stores and online retailer. The company was founded in 1892 by Richard Warren Sears and Alvah Curtis Roebuck and reincorporated in 1906 by Richard Sears and Julius Rosenwald. The company began as a mail-order catalog company and opened its first retail locations in 1925. Through the 1980s, Sears was the largest retailer in the United States, but was surpassed in 1989 by Walmart.

In 2005, Eddie Lampert took control of the company through Kmart. The merger resulted in Sears Holdings. Sears' parent company filed for Chapter 11 bankruptcy on October 15, 2018. After the bankruptcy, Transformco has shifted focus onto managing and selling off the remaining real estate assets.

From 2,705 stores at its peak in 2011, only five stores are still open in the U.S. as of December 2025.

== History ==
=== 19th century: Beginnings ===
Sears's founders

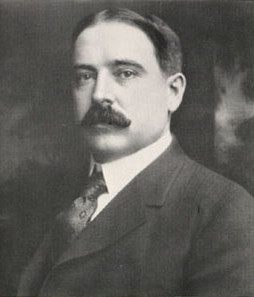
Richard Warren Sears

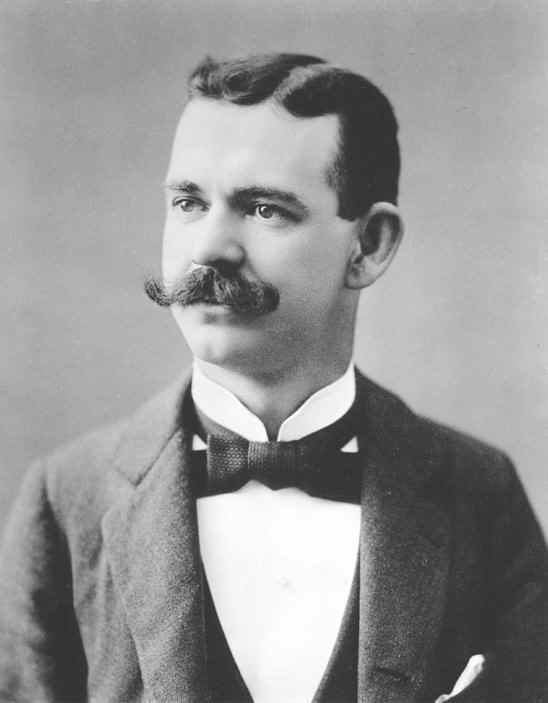
Alvah Curtis Roebuck

Richard Warren Sears was born in 1863 in Stewartville, Minnesota, to a wealthy family which moved to nearby Spring Valley. In 1879, his father died shortly after losing the family fortune in a speculative stock deal. Sears moved across the state to work as a railroad station agent in North Redwood, then Minneapolis.

While he was in North Redwood, a jeweler refused delivery on a shipment of watches. Sears purchased them and sold them at a low price to the station agents, making a profit. He started a mail-order watch business in Minneapolis in 1886, calling it the R.W. Sears Watch Company. That year, he met Alvah Curtis Roebuck, a watch repairman. In 1887, Sears and Roebuck relocated the business to Chicago, and the company published Richard Sears's first mail-order catalog, offering watches, diamonds, and jewelry.

In 1889, Sears sold his business for $100,000 ($3.2 million in 2025 dollars) and relocated to Iowa, planning to be a rural banker. He returned to Chicago in 1892 and established a new mail-order firm, again selling watches and jewelry, with Roebuck as his partner, operating as the A. C. Roebuck watch company. On September 16, 1893, they renamed the company Sears, Roebuck, and Co. and began to diversify the product lines offered in their catalogs.

By 1894, the Sears catalog had grown to 322 pages, including many new items, such as sewing machines, bicycles, sporting goods and automobiles (later produced, from 1905 to 1915, by Lincoln Motor Car Works of Chicago [no relation to the current Ford line]). By 1895, the company was producing a 532-page catalog. Sales were over $400,000 ($13 million in 2025 dollars) in 1893 and over $750,000 ($25 million in 2025 dollars) two years later. By 1896, dolls, stoves, and groceries were added to the catalog.

Despite the strong and growing sales, the national Panic of 1893 led to a full-scale economic depression, causing a cash squeeze and large quantities of unsold merchandise by 1895. Roebuck decided to quit, returning later in a publicity role. Sears offered Roebuck's half of the company to Chicago businessman Aaron Nusbaum, who in turn brought in his brother-in-law Julius Rosenwald, to whom Sears owed money. In August 1895, they bought Roebuck's half of the company for $75,000 ($2.5 million in 2025 dollars), and that month the company was reincorporated in Illinois with a capital stock of $150,000 ($5 million in 2025 dollars). The transaction was handled by Albert Henry Loeb of Chicago law firm Loeb & Adler (now Arnstein & Lehr); copies of the transaction are still displayed on the firm's walls.

=== Early 20th century ===
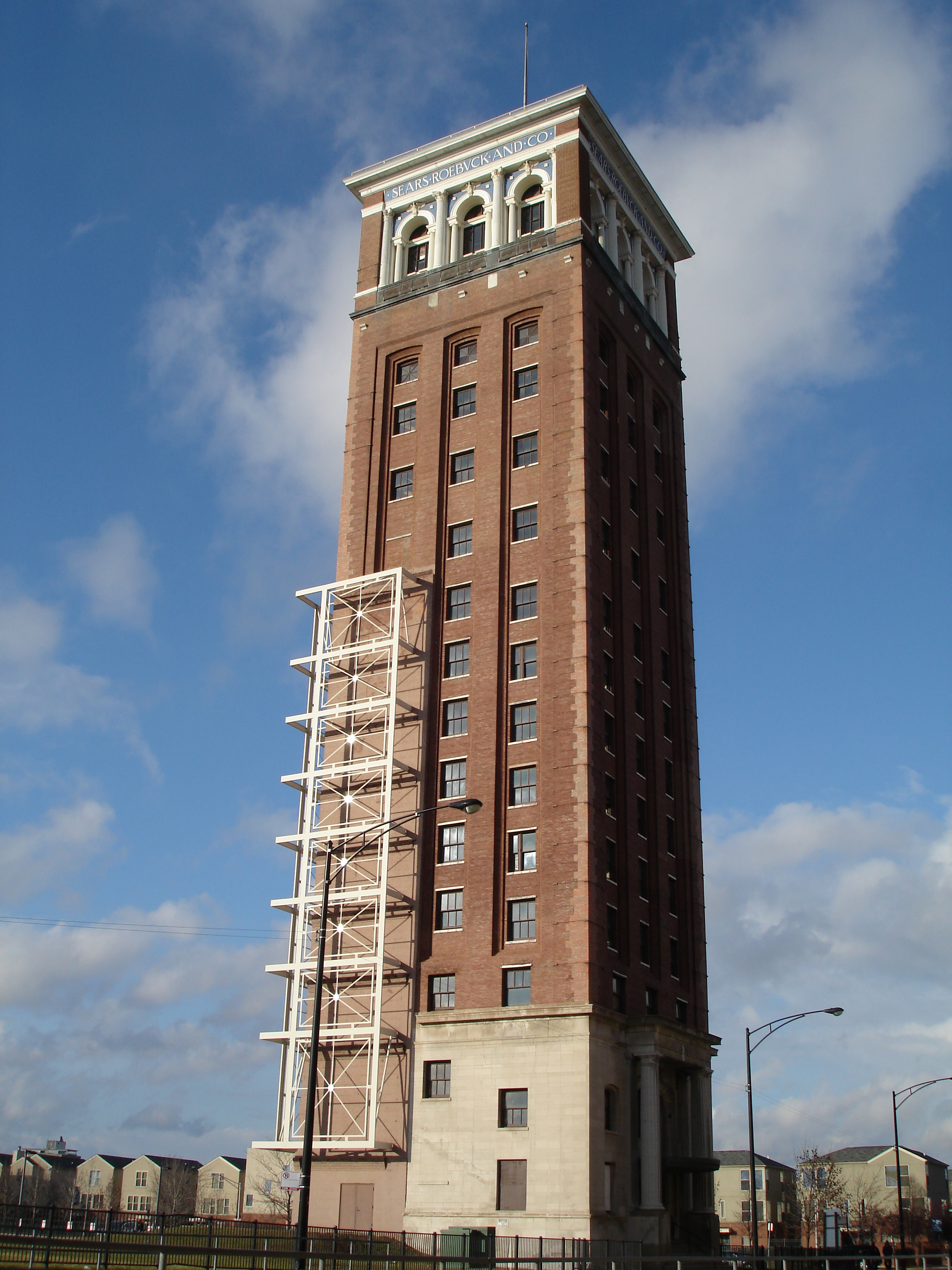
The exterior of the former Sears Merchandise Building Tower, now the John D. and Alexandra C. Nichols Tower

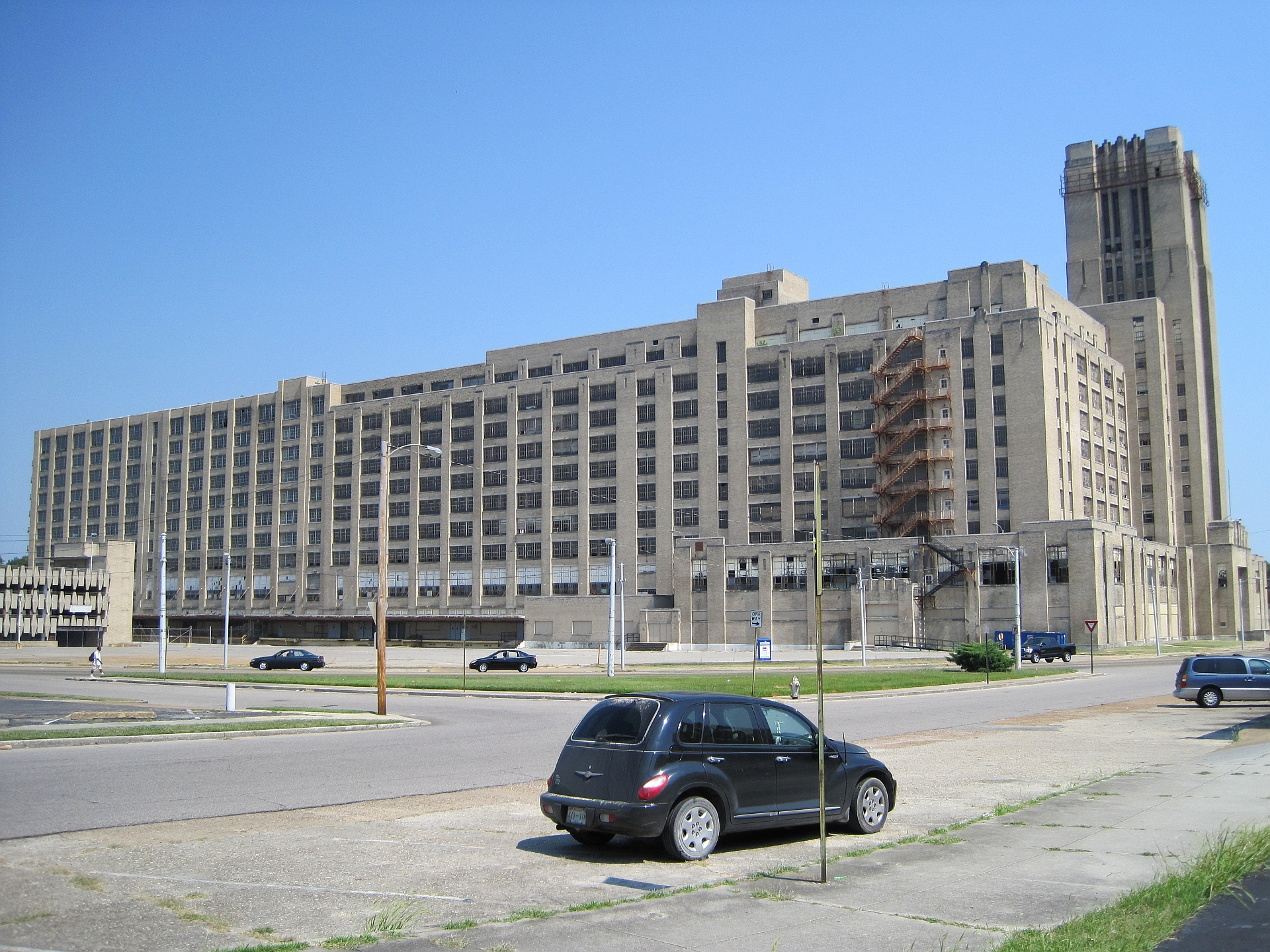
Former Sears Catalog Distribution Center and Retail Store, now Crosstown Concourse, in Memphis, Tennessee

Sears and Rosenwald got along well with each other, but not with Nusbaum; they bought his interest in the firm for $1.3 million in 1903 ($47 million in 2025 dollars). Rosenwald brought to the mail-order firm a rational management philosophy and diversified product lines: dry goods, consumer durables, drugs, hardware, furniture, and nearly anything else a farm household could desire.

Sales continued to proliferate, and the prosperity of the company and their vision for more significant expansion led Sears and Rosenwald to take the company public in 1906, with a stock placement of $40 million ($1.1 billion in 2025 dollars). They had to incorporate a new company to bring the operation public; Sears and Rosenwald established Sears, Roebuck and Company with the legal name Sears, Roebuck and Co., in the state of New York, which effectively replaced the original company. The current company inherits the history of the old company, celebrating the original 1892 incorporation, rather than the 1906 revision, as the start of the company.

Sears's successful 1906 initial public offering (IPO) marks the first major retail IPO in American financial history and represented a coming of age, financially, of the consumer sector. The company traded under the ticker symbol S and was a component of the Dow Jones Industrial Average from 1924 to 1999.

In 1906, Sears opened its catalog plant and the Sears Merchandise Building Tower in Chicago's West Side. The building was the anchor of what would become the massive 40-acre (16 ha) Sears, Roebuck and Company Complex of offices, laboratories, and mail-order operations at Homan Avenue and Arthington Street. The complex served as corporate headquarters until 1973 when the Sears Tower was completed and served as the base of the mail-order catalog business until 1995.

By 1907, under Rosenwald's leadership as vice president and treasurer, annual sales of the company climbed to roughly $50 million ($1.3 billion in 2025 dollars). Sears resigned from the presidency in 1908 due to declining health, with Rosenwald named president and chairman of the board and taking on full control.

In 1910, Sears acquired the David Bradley Plow company. This acquisition would lead to the manufacturing of riding mowers, chainsaws, tillers, etc., in the Bradley Illinois factory.

The company was badly hurt during 1919–21 as a severe depression hit the nation's farms. To bail out the company, Rosenwald pledged $21 million ($300 million in 2025 dollars) of his personal wealth in 1921. By 1922, Sears had regained financial stability.

=== Boom years ===
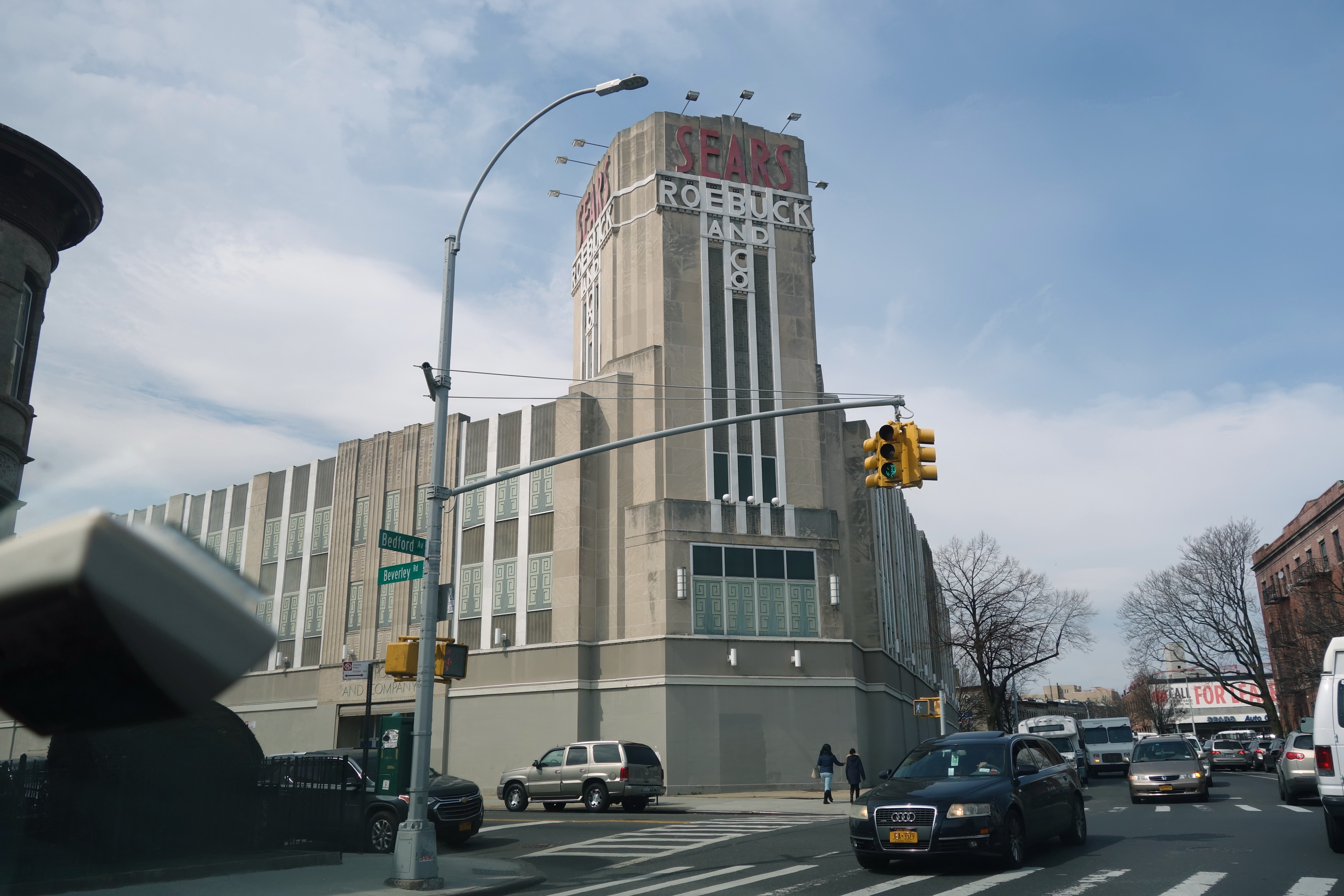
Art Deco 1930s Sears store in Brooklyn, New York City

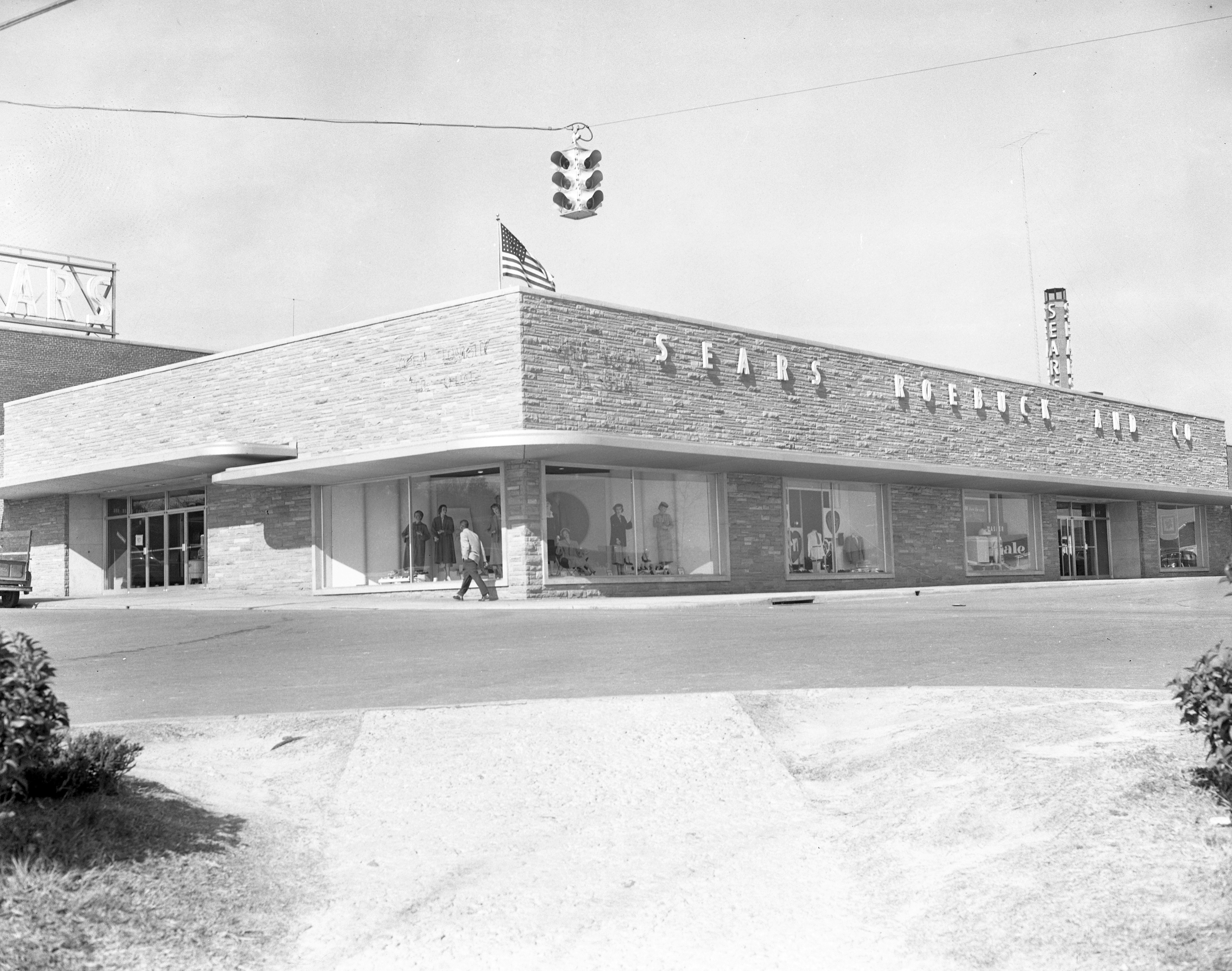
Store in Raleigh, North Carolina (c. 1952)

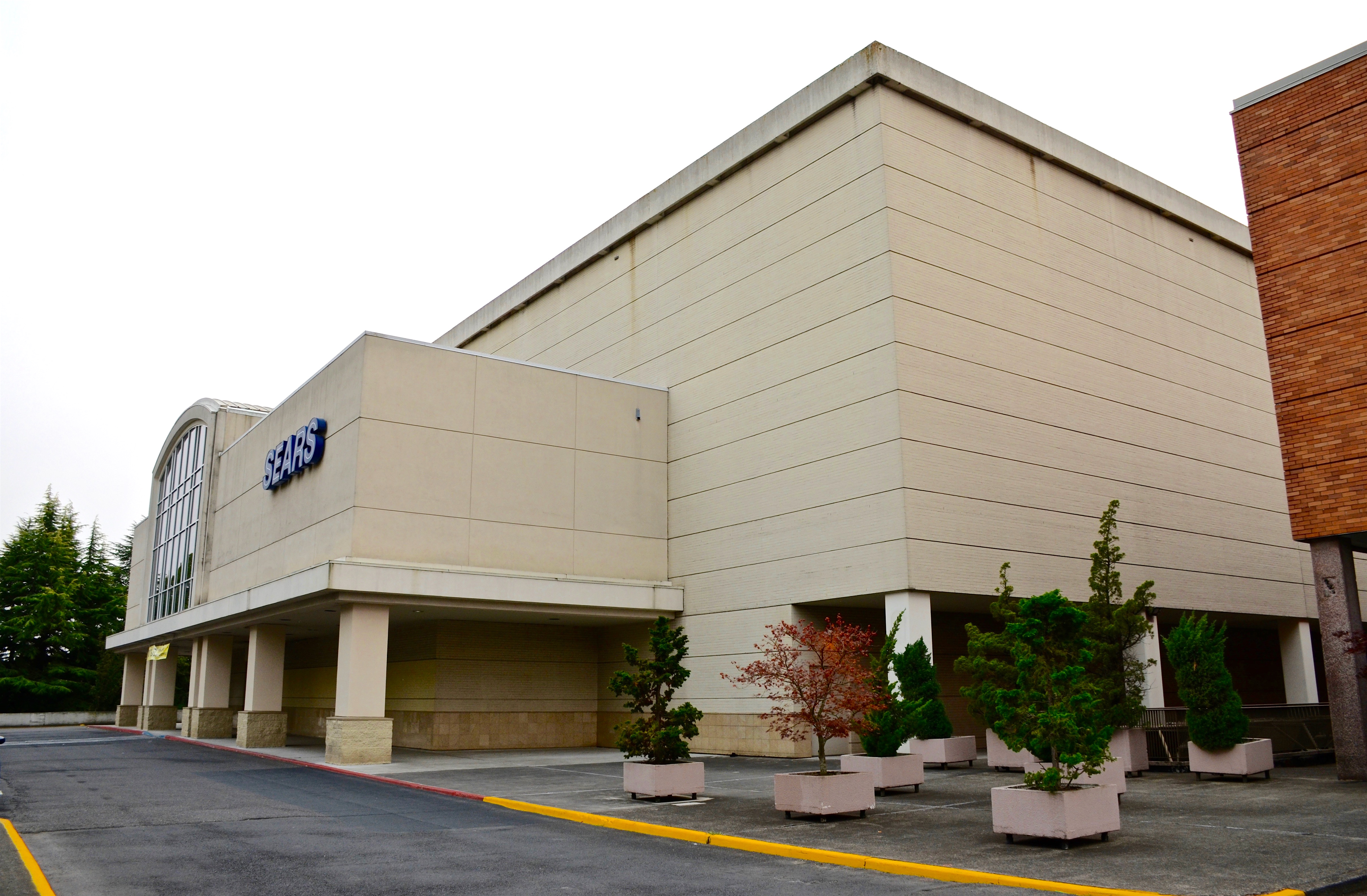
Typical Sears mall anchor store in the Lloyd Center in Portland, Oregon, shown here in 2017, that opened in November 1999 in a former JCPenney that closed in June 1998. The store closed on April 8, 2018.

==== Brick and mortar ====
Rosenwald decided to shift emphasis to urban North America and brought in Robert E. Wood to take charge. Rosenwald oversaw the design and construction of the firm's first department store, built on land within the Sears, Roebuck, and Company Complex. The store opened in 1925. In 1924, Rosenwald resigned the presidency but remained as chair until he died in 1932; his goal was to devote more time to philanthropy.

The first store opened on February 2, 1925, as an experiment in the North Lawndale Sears, Roebuck and Company Complex. Despite its remote location on the outskirts of Chicago, its success led to dozens of further openings across the country, many in conjunction with the company's mail-order offices, typically in lower-middle-class and working-class neighborhoods, far from the main downtown shopping district. This was considered highly unconventional at a time when shopping was concentrated in city centers, but through World War II, there was an extensive streetcar network in Chicago and other U.S. cities. However, rapidly increasing car ownership and the brand's huge popularity helped attract customers.

Sears retail stores were pioneering and broke the conventions of the time in three ways:

- their location away from central shopping districts,
- innovative store design, and
- unconventional product mix and retailing practices.

Many stores at this time were designed by architect George C. Nimmons and his firms. The architecture was driven by merchandising needs rather than the desired outer appearance. This made the stores excellent examples of the modern architecture of the time—styles made famous by Bertram Goodhue and Eliel Saarinen.

Its stores were oriented to motorists. Set apart from existing business districts amid residential areas occupied by their target audience, they had ample, free, off-street parking and communicated a clear corporate identity. In the 1930s, the company designed fully air-conditioned, "windowless" stores, such as Sears-Pico in 1939 in Los Angeles, which was the first to have an open plan selling floor (instead of breaking up the floor into discrete sections).

Sears was also a pioneer in creating department stores that catered to men and women. The stores included hardware and building materials. It de-emphasized the latest clothing fashions in favor of practical and durable clothing and allowed customers to select goods without the aid of a clerk.

==== Catalog ====
In 1933, Sears issued the first of its Christmas catalogs known as the "Sears Wishbook", a catalog featuring toys and gifts, separate from the annual Christmas Catalog. From 1908 to 1940, it included ready-to-assemble Sears Catalog Home kit houses.

==== Americas ====
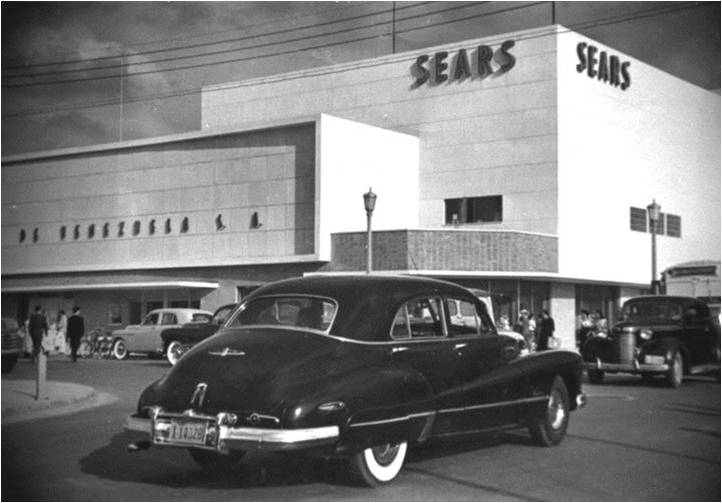
Sears at Bello Monte in Caracas, Venezuela, in 1950

Sears opened a small store in Downtown Havana, Cuba, in 1942. Sears opened its first store in Mexico City in 1947; the Mexican stores would later spin off into Sears Mexico, now owned by billionaire Carlos Slim's Grupo Sanborns, which in 2020 operated more than 75 stores across Mexico.

Sears had sales of US$78 million in other territories in 1953. Over time, Sears expanded into all Brazil, Colombia, Cuba, Ecuador, Peru, Puerto Rico, Venezuela and all Central American countries. Currently Sears operates in Mexico, Guatemala, and El Salvador.

==== Expansion ====
From the 1920s to the 1950s, Sears built many urban department stores in the U.S., Canada, and Mexico (apart from, but not far from, existing central business districts), and they overshadowed the mail-order business. Following World War II, the company expanded into suburban markets and malls. In 1959, it had formed the Homart Development Company for developing malls. Many of the company's stores have undergone major renovations or replacements since the 1980s. Sears began to diversify in the 1930s, creating Allstate Insurance Company in 1931 and placing Allstate representatives in its stores in 1934 (Allstate was also used as a house brand on a range of motorized vehicles sold by Sears). Over the decades, it established major national brands, such as Kenmore, Craftsman, DieHard, Silvertone, Supertone, and Toughskins — and marketed widely under its private labels, e.g., marketing the Sears Archer 600 typewriter as a rebranded Silverette model, manufactured by Silver Seiko Ltd. of Japan.

The success of Sears outdoor products raised the attention of the Federal Government and the antitrust laws. Sears purchased David Bradley to manufacture farm and lawn equipment. Its success was broken up in 1962 as they sold more plows than John Deere. Sears sold half of the David Bradley factory in Bradley, Illinois to the Newark Ohio Company that was shortly acquired by Roper Industries.

==== 1970s pinnacle ====
Sears reached its pinnacle in the 1970s. In 1974, Sears completed the 110-story Sears Tower in Chicago, which became the world's tallest building, a title it took from the former Twin Towers in New York. Upon moving out of Chicago, Sears sold the Sears Tower in 1988. In the sale contract of the tower, Sears retained its naming rights to the building until 2003, but the Sears Tower retained the name until early 2009, when London-based insurer Willis Group Holdings, Ltd. was given the building's naming rights to encourage them to occupy the building. Sears moved to the new Prairie Stone Business Park in Hoffman Estates, Illinois, between 1993 and 1995. The Sears Centre Arena (renamed to Now Arena in 2020) is a 10,001-seat multi-purpose arena located in Hoffman Estates adjacent to the former Prairie Stone campus.

==== Video games ====
Sears formed a stable OEM relationship with Atari, Inc., being responsible for distributing home versions of Pong in 1975 and eventually the Atari Video Computer System under their Tele-Games brand, where the company published games under different titles. Sears released several models of the VCS as the Sears Video Arcade series starting in 1977, with the final Sears-specific model, the Video Arcade II, releasing during the fall of 1982. Three games developed by Atari were exclusively released by Sears: Steeplechase, Stellar Track, and Submarine Commander.

==== Mail order ====
The Sears catalog became known in the industry as "the Consumers' Bible". The company began selling to foreign customers after the American occupation of Greenland in World War II and the Philippines, among others, when locals ordered from catalogs left by soldiers. Novelists and story writers often portrayed the importance of the catalog in the emotional lives of rural folk. The catalog also entered the language, particularly of rural dwellers, as a euphemism for toilet paper, as its pages could be torn out and used as such. In addition, for many rural African-Americans, especially in areas dominated by Jim Crow racial segregation, the Sears catalog was a vital alternative to white-owned stores, bypassing the stores' frequent intention to deny them fair access to merchandise.

However, as the nation urbanized, Sears's catalog business faced competition from city department stores. Rural North America's population was slow-growing and possessed far less spending power than urban North America.

=== 1980s: Expansion into non-retail entities ===
In the 1980s, the company began to diversify into non-retail entities such as buying Dean Witter and Coldwell Banker in 1981. In 1984, it launched Prodigy as a joint venture with IBM and CBS, and introduced the Discover credit card in 1985. However, these actions have been said to have distracted management's attention from the core retail business and allowed competing retailers to gain significant ground, culminating with Walmart surpassing Sears as the largest retailer in the United States in 1990.

=== 1990s and early 2000s: decline ===
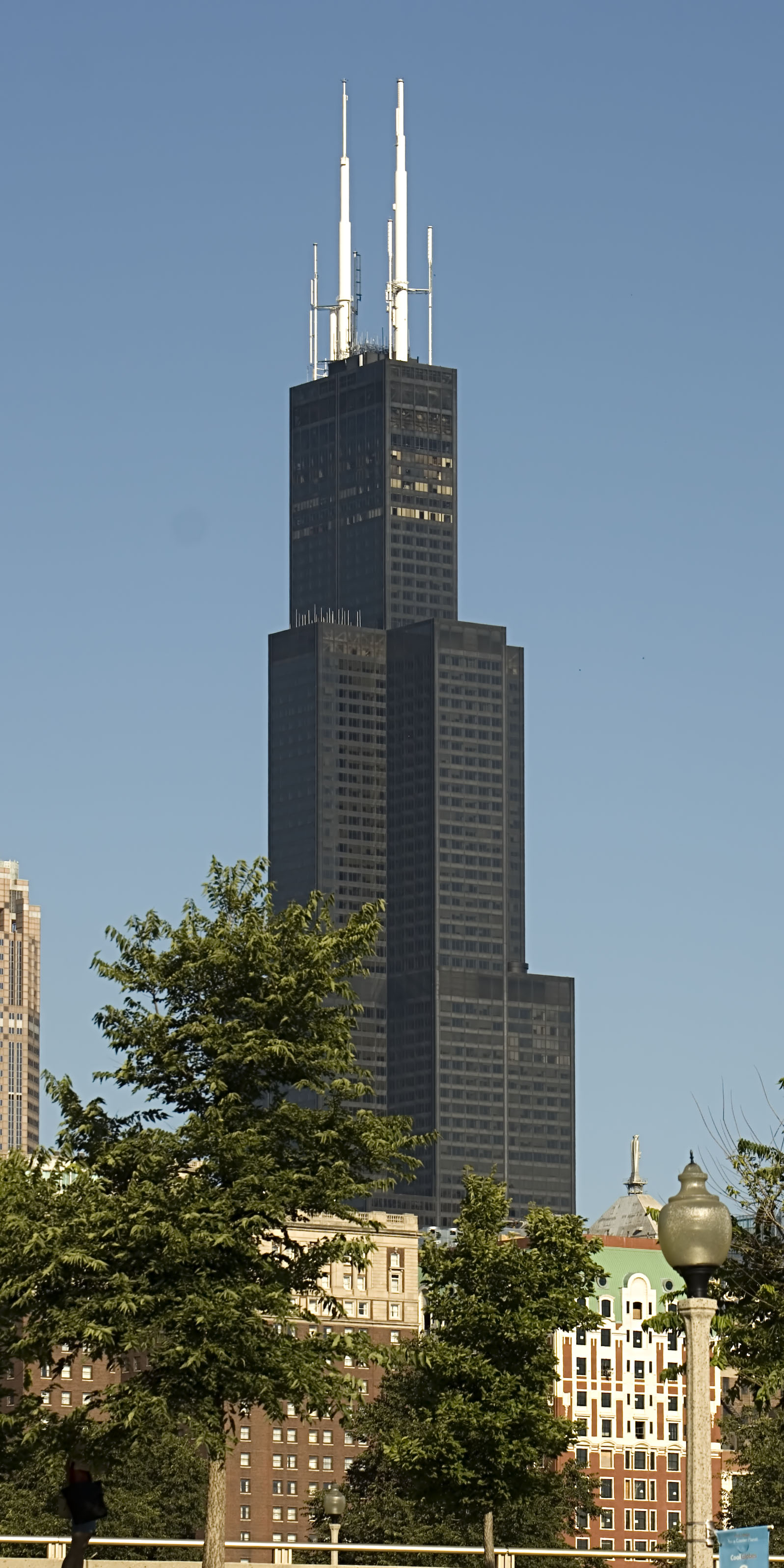
The former Sears Tower, now the Willis Tower, in Chicago

In the 1990s, the company began divesting itself of many non-retail entities, which were detrimental to its bottom line. Sears spun off Allstate and its financial services arm, which included brokerage business Dean Witter Reynolds and Discover Card. It sold its mall building subsidiary Homart to General Growth Properties in 1995. Sears later acquired hardware chain Orchard Supply Hardware in 1996 and started home improvement store The Great Indoors in 1997.

The cost of distributing the once highly influential general merchandise catalog became prohibitive; sales and profits had declined. The company announced on January 25, 1993 that it would close 113 stores, terminate 50,000 workers, and discontinue the "big book" catalogue. In 1992, the company posted a $3.9 billion loss, the largest ever from a North American retailer.

In 1992, California successfully sued the company for falsely finding things wrong with automobiles in for repair for other reasons. In 1997, criminal charges were made. In 1998, Sears announced it had sold the remnants of Western Auto (which it had acquired in 1998) to Roanoke-based Advance Auto Parts. The business deal was not what experts in the after-market automotive industry expected: Sears, Roebuck became "one of the largest shareholders" after obtaining a 40% stake in Advance Auto Parts and merging their two store networks, which included Western Auto's wholesale and retail operations. The existing store network of Advance Auto Parts, comprising 915 stores in 17 U.S. states, merged with 590 U.S.-based Parts America Stores in addition to 40 Western Auto stores in the Commonwealth of Puerto Rico. In 1997, Sears sold 85% of its Mexico affiliate to Grupo Carso. Sears Holdings continued to produce specialty catalogs and reintroduced a smaller version of the Holiday Wish Book in 2007.

On March 26, 2001, Sears acquired 18 department stores and 10 freestanding auto centers from Montgomery Ward, planning to remodel and reopen these former Ward stores by 2002. Four of these former Montgomery Ward locations were to be converted to The Great Indoors, while 14 were to be converted to Sears. Sears also opened two new Chicago-area Appliances and Electronics stores in Bolingbrook and Mt. Prospect, Illinois on November 15 of the year.

In 2002, Sears announced plans to open 15 new full-line stores, including a new store at the Harford Mall in Bel Air, Maryland, alongside remodeling an additional 50 nationwide by the end of the year. The following year, Sears sold its U.S. retail credit card operation to Citibank. The remaining card operations for Sears Canada were sold to JPMorgan Chase in August 2005.

In 2003, Sears opened a new concept store called Sears Grand. Sears Grand stores carried everything that a regular Sears carried, and more. The first store was opened at 7453 South Plaza Center Drive, at Jordan Landing, in West Jordan, Utah on October 11 of the year, followed in 2004 by Gurnee, Illinois on April 3, Las Vegas, Nevada on July 31, and Rancho Cucamonga, California on October 30.

=== 2004–2018: Merger with Kmart and decline ===
On November 17, 2004, Kmart Holdings Corporation announced it would acquire Sears, Roebuck, and Co. for $11 billion after Kmart completed its recovery from bankruptcy. As a part of the acquisition, Kmart Holding Corporation, along with Sears, Roebuck, and Co., was transformed into the new Sears Holdings Corporation. The new company started trading on the NASDAQ stock exchange as SHLD; Sears sold its single-letter ticker symbol 'S' in the New York Stock Exchange that it had held since 1910 to Sprint Corporation. The new corporation announced that it would continue to operate stores under both the Sears and Kmart brands. In 2005, the company began renovating some Kmart stores and converting them to the Sears Essentials format, only to change them later to Sears Grands. The combined company's profits peaked at $1.5 billion in 2006.

By 2010, the company was no longer profitable; from 2011 to 2016, the company lost $10.4 billion. In 2014, its total debt ($4.2 billion at the end of January 2017) exceeded its market capitalization ($974.1 million as of March 21, 2017). Sears declined from more than 3,500 physical stores to 695 U.S. stores from 2010 to 2017. Sales at Sears stores dropped 10.3 percent in the final quarter of 2016 when compared to the same period in 2015.

Sears spent much of 2014 and 2015 selling off portions of its balance sheet; namely, Lands' End and its stake in Sears Canada, one of the biggest e-commerce players in Canada, with CAD$505 million in sales in 2015—more than Walmart and others who had begun pushing aggressively into online sales, such as Canadian Tire. Sears stated that the company was looking to focus on becoming a more tech-driven retailer. Sears's CEO and top shareholder said the sell-off of key assets in the last year had given the retailer the money it needs to speed up its transformation. Sears Holdings had lost a total of US$7 billion in the four years to 2015. In part, the retailer was trying to curb losses by using a loyalty program called Shop Your Way. Sears believed the membership scheme would enhance repeat business and customer loyalty in the long term.

Between September 26 and October 12, 2017, a malware was installed in the computers operated by a service provider for sears.com and kmart.com e-commerce sites in which the credit card information of 100,000 customers were exposed via a malicious script. The breach was not publicly announced until April 2018.

CEO Eddie Lampert also concluded an arrangement that sold the Craftsman brand to Stanley Black & Decker Inc. for approximately US$900 million. In October 2017, Sears and appliance manufacturer Whirlpool Corporation ended their 101-year-old association, reportedly due to pricing issues, although Whirlpool continued supplying Sears with Kenmore-branded appliances. In May 2018, Sears announced it had formed a "special committee" to explore the sale of Kenmore.

=== 2018–present: Bankruptcy and current operations ===
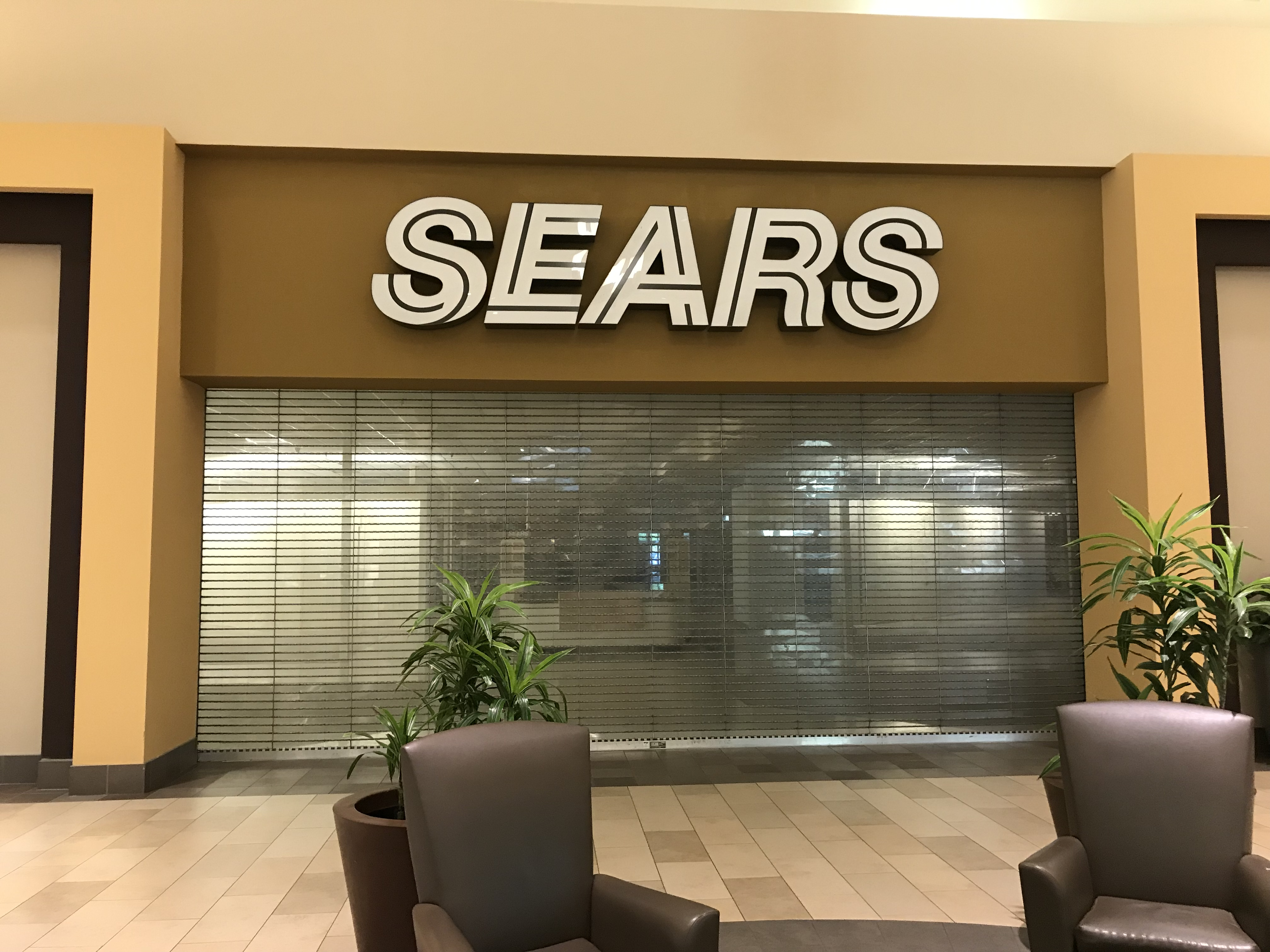
A closed Sears store at Stones River Town Centre, in Murfreesboro, Tennessee, in April 2019, with signage still intact. The store closed two months earlier, in February 2019.

On September 24, 2018, Lampert warned that Sears was "running out of time" to salvage its business. Sears Holdings filed for Chapter 11 bankruptcy on October 15, 2018, ahead of a $134 million debt payment due that day. On November 23, 2018, Sears Holdings released a list of 505 stores, including 266 Sears stores, that were for sale in the bankruptcy process, while all others would hold liquidation sales.

On January 16, 2019, Lampert won the bankruptcy auction with an offer to maintain about 400 stores; Sears Holdings announced it would remain open. On February 7, 2019, Lampert's $5.2 billion plan to keep the business going was approved by a bankruptcy judge. The approval meant roughly 425 stores, including 223 Sears stores, and 45,000 jobs would be preserved.

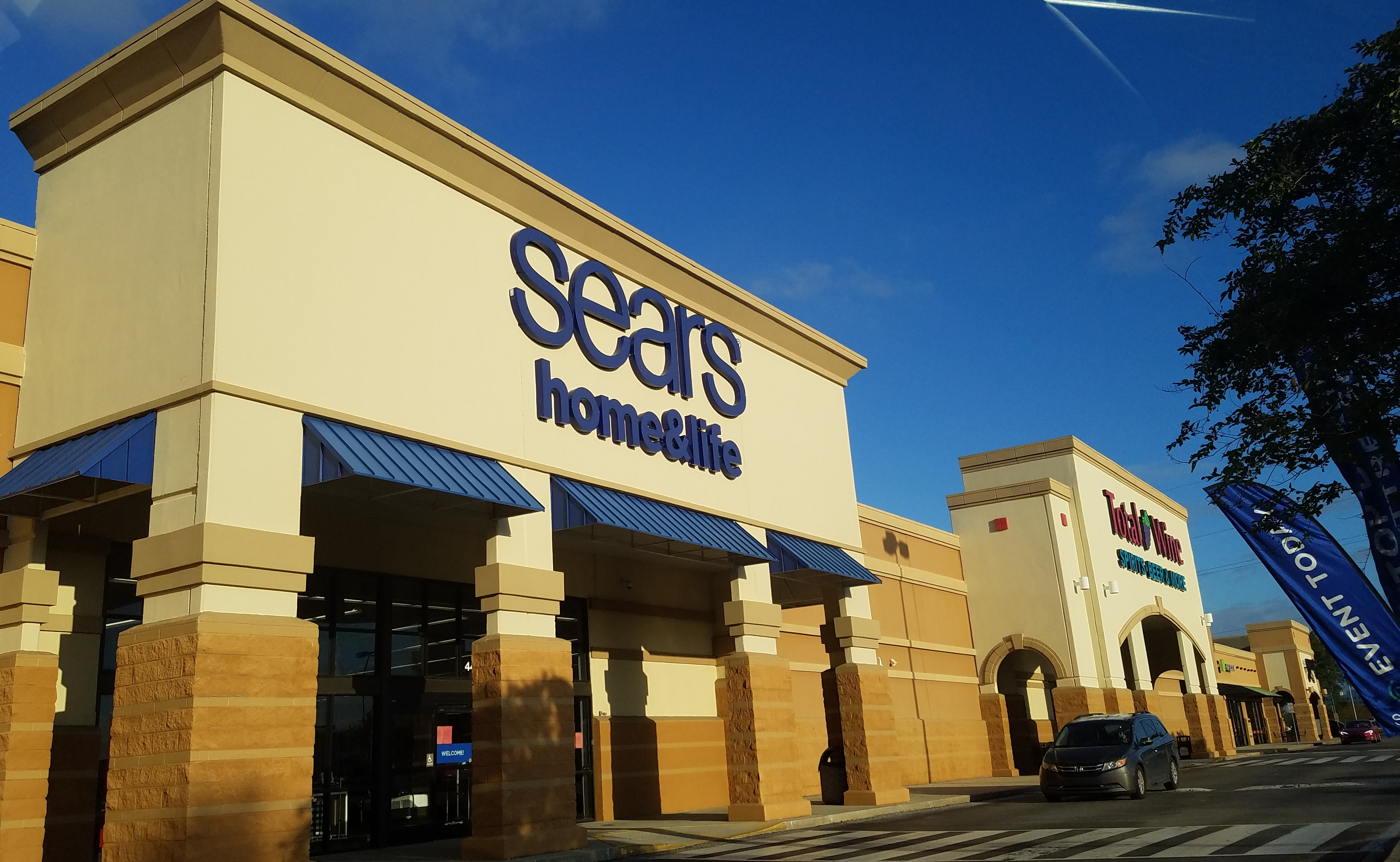
A new Sears Home & Life store in Lafayette, Louisiana, as depicted in November 2020. It closed in June 2023 along with all other remaining small-format Sears stores in the U.S.

In April 2019, Sears announced the opening of three new stores with a limited set of merchandise under the name Sears Home & Life. Also that month, Sears closed its store at Windward Mall in Kaneohe, Hawaii, and its store at Oakbrook Center in Oak Brook, Illinois (which was razed and already rebuilt as a 1-story store), making it the first post-bankruptcy closure for the brand since being bought by ESL.

On June 3, 2019, the company announced that Transform Holdco would acquire Sears Hometown & Outlet Stores. As per deal, it might need to divest its Sears Outlet division to gain approval. On August 7, 2019, it was announced that 26 stores would close that October, including 21 Sears stores, among them the last Sears stores in Alabama and West Virginia, at Riverchase Galleria in Hoover and at Huntington Mall in Barboursville, respectively. The announcement also included plans to "accelerate the expansion of our smaller store formats which includes opening additional Home & Life stores and adding several hundred Sears Hometown stores after the Sears Hometown and Outlet transaction closes." On August 31, 2019, management announced that Transform would close an additional 92 stores, including 15 Sears stores, by the end of 2019. Near the end of 2019, Sears sold the brand name DieHard to Advance Auto Parts for $200 million.

A total of 100 more stores closed by December 2019. 51 Sears stores were closed in February 2020. More stores continued to close throughout 2020 and 2021 including the final Sears in Maine at The Maine Mall.

In 2021, an unauthorized party accessed Transformco computer servers between June 3 and June 15 that held employee payroll and healthcare information that affected current and past Sears and other Transformco employees.

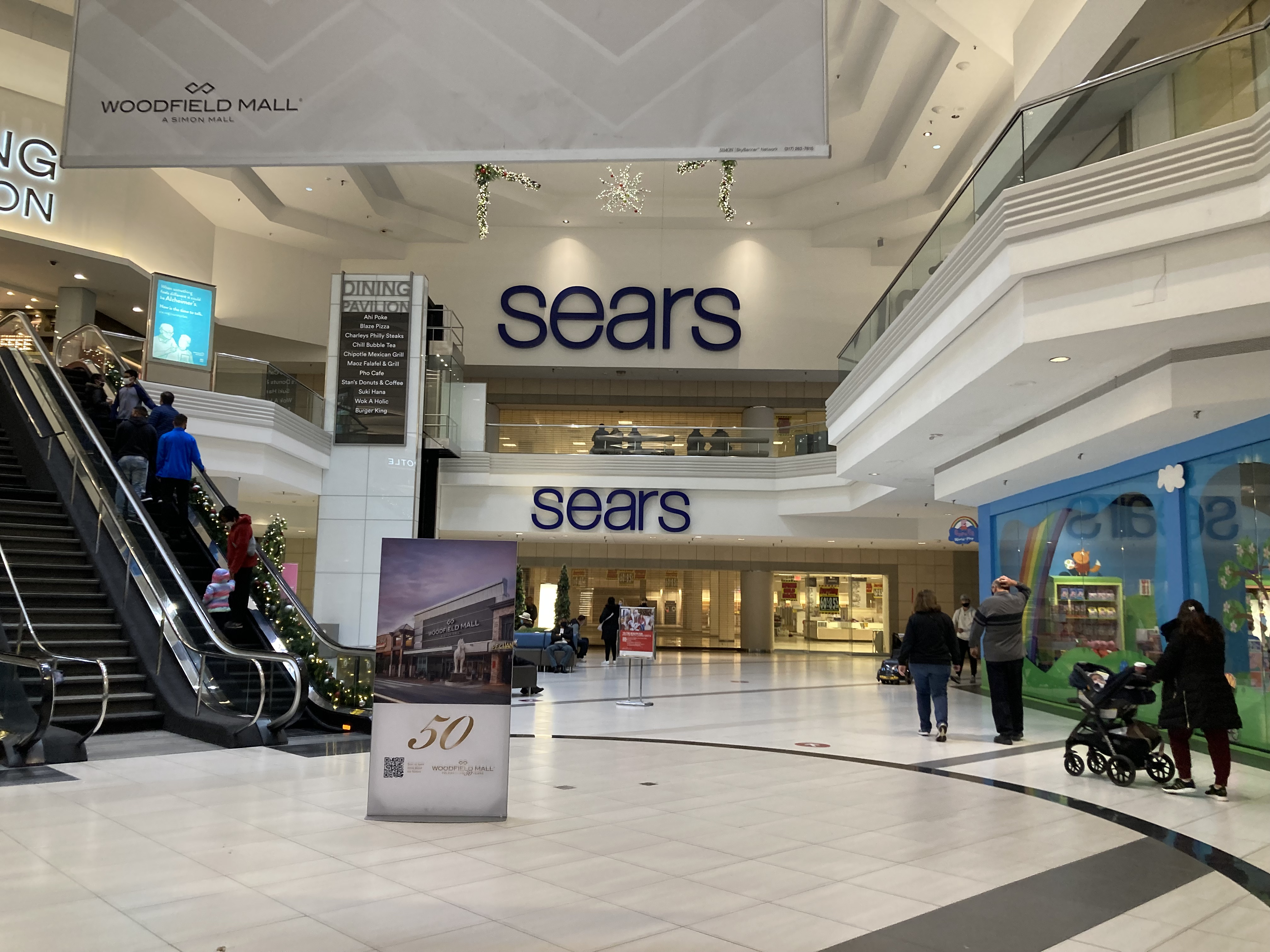
The store at Woodfield Mall in Schaumburg, the last Illinois Sears location to close on November 14, 2021

In September 2021, the company's website listed 35 Sears stores. That month, Sears announced that it would close more stores, including the last Sears store in New York City. The New York City Sears closed by November 24, 2021, with the potential to be redeveloped. Transformco announced in December 2021 its plans to sell the 2.3 million sq ft (210,000 m^{2}) Sears headquarters in Hoffman Estates, which includes 100 acres (40 ha) of undeveloped land.

On January 19, 2022, Sears shut down the remaining 15 Sears Auto Centers in the United States.

In May 2022, it was announced that roughly 100 more Sears Hometown stores, including the last four in Michigan, would close permanently. On December 13, 2022, Sears Hometown filed for Chapter 11 bankruptcy. It was later revealed that all remaining Sears Hometown stores would be liquidated and permanently closed.

On December 12, 2022, Sears Authorized Hometown Stores, LLC, and affiliated debtor Sears Hometown, Inc., filed for Chapter 11 bankruptcy protection, and on December 26 announced the liquidation of the 115 largely owner-operated Hometown stores.

Demolition of the company's former headquarters in Hoffman Estates began in August 2024 in order to build datacenters.

By 2023, there were fewer than 20 locations still open in the United States and that year alone saw Sears exiting five more states: Colorado, Kansas, Louisiana, North Carolina and Pennsylvania. The last store in Puerto Rico closed on August 31, 2025. As of December 2025, there are five Sears stores remaining, two of which are in Florida, including one in operation since 1954. The company's U.S. website, Sears.com, remains active for online purchases via distribution centers and third-party sellers using the website as an online sales portal.

== Corporate affairs ==
=== Logo ===
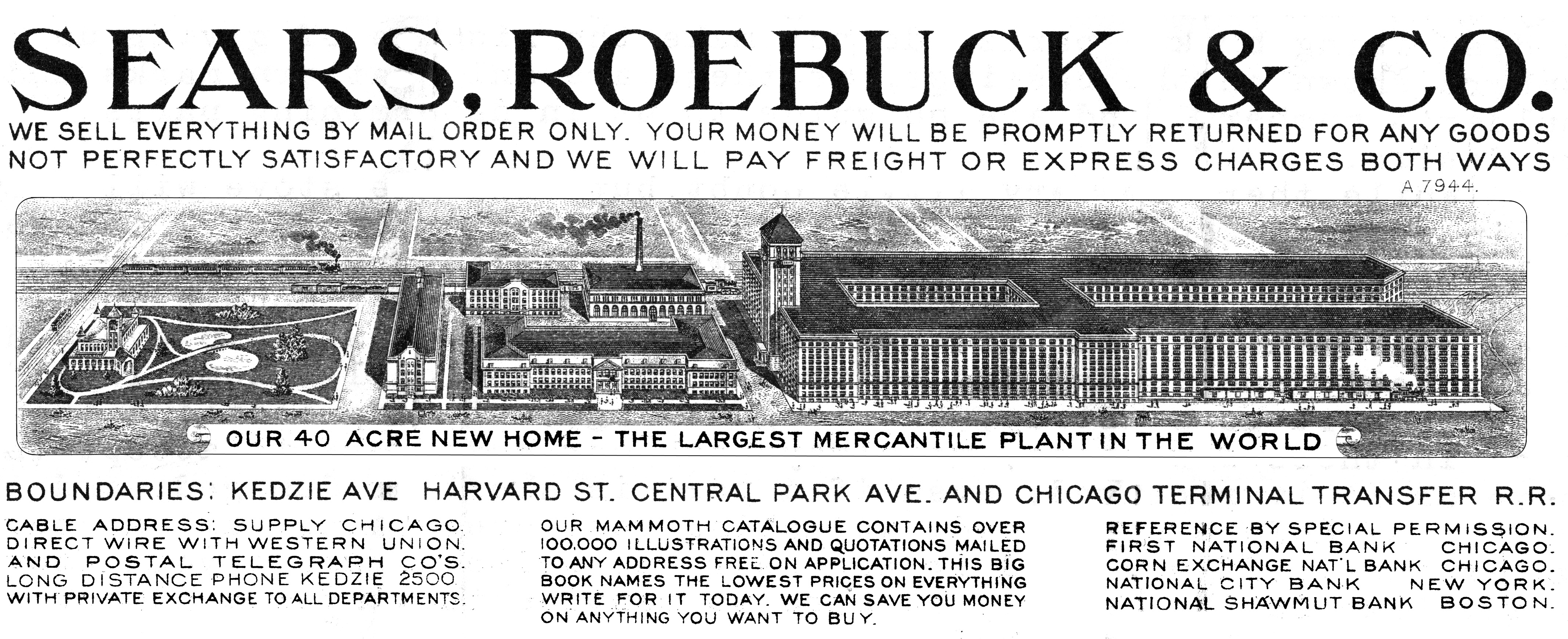
Logo used in 1907

Logo used from 1966 to 1984

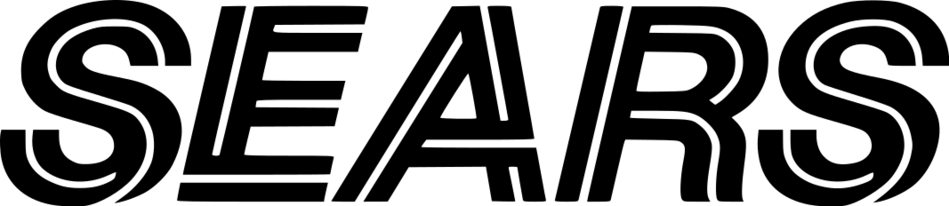
Logo used from 1984 to 1994

Logo used from 1994 to 2004; a red version of this logo is still used by Sears Mexico.

Logo used from 2004 to 2007

Logo used from 2007 to 2010 in the United States, this variant removes the red stripe that was seen underneath the previous logo

Logo used from 2010 to 2019

Logo used from 2019 to 2020

Logo used from 2020 to present

=== Sponsorships ===
Before the company filed for bankruptcy, Sears sponsored many entertainment and sporting events.

From 2006 until 2020, it had the naming rights to an 11,000-seat multi-purpose family entertainment, cultural and sports center in Hoffman Estates, the Now Arena.

The company sponsored the television series Extreme Makeover: Home Edition. The company also underwrote the PBS television series Mister Rogers' Neighborhood, under the name The Sears-Roebuck Foundation, from the show's premiere in 1968 until 1992.

Through the Sears Auto Centers, the company sponsored the Formula Drift Darren McNamara Sears/Falken Saturn Sky drift car. It sponsored the NASCAR Truck Series, using the Craftsman brand as the title sponsor, from the series' inception in the 1995 NASCAR SuperTruck Series presented by Craftsman to the 2008 season, when the agreement ended. It sponsored the #10 Gillett Evernham Motorsports car of Scott Riggs for the September 2, 2007, running of the Sharp AQUOS 500 at California Speedway through its Sears Auto Center branch. However, Riggs failed to qualify for the event. In 2016, Craftsman became the title sponsor of the World Racing Group, World of Outlaws Sprint car racing series.

=== Employee relations ===
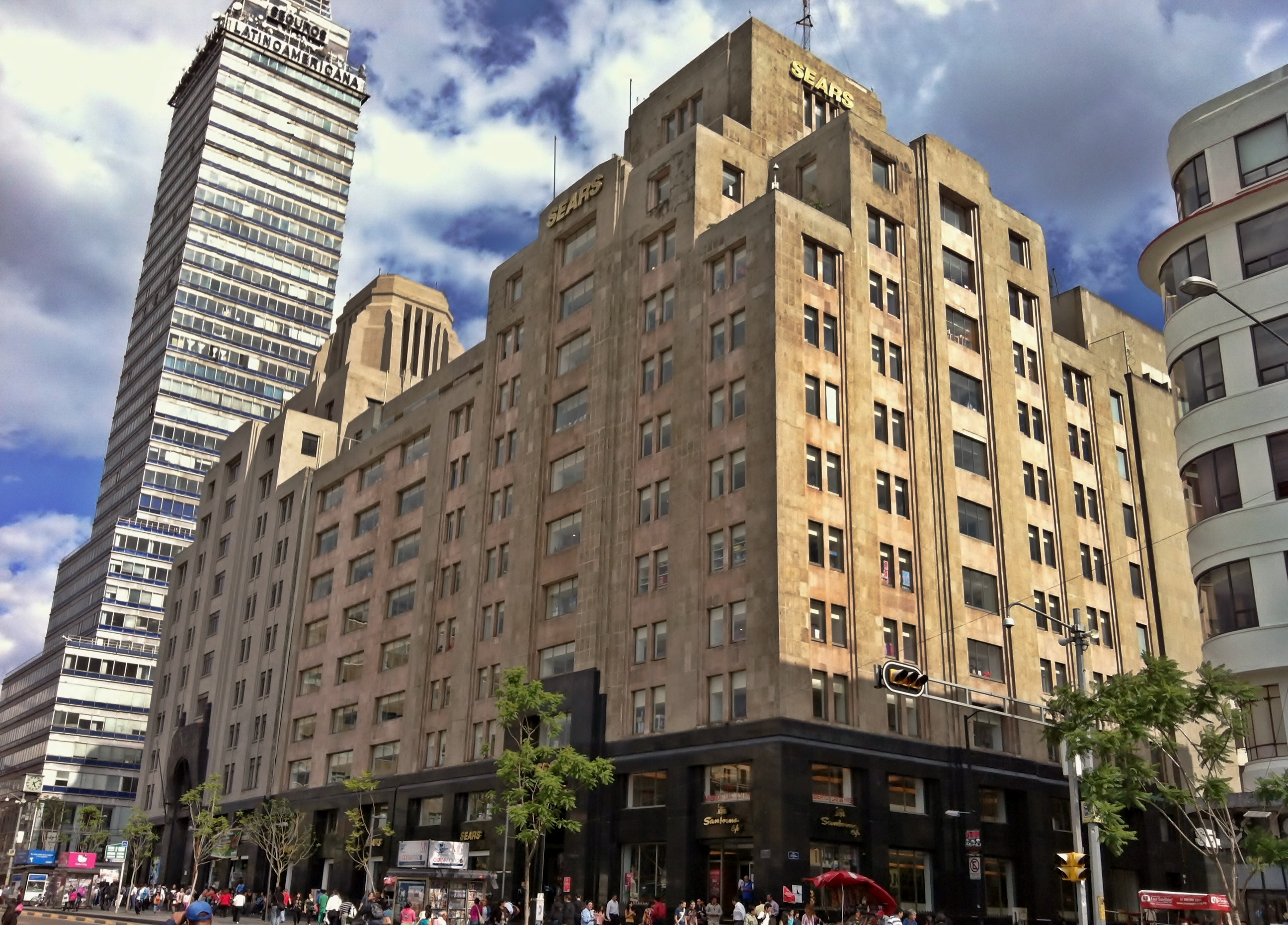
Sears building in the Edificio La Nacional building in Mexico City, across from the Palacio de Bellas Artes

Sears has struggled with employee relations. One notable example was the shift in 1992 from an hourly wage based on longevity to a base wage (usually between US$3.50 and US$6 per hour) and commissions ranging from 0.5% to 11%. Sears said the new base wage, often constituting a substantial (up to 40%) cut in pay, was done "to be successful in this highly competitive environment".

In early October 2007, Sears cut commission rates for employees in some departments to between 0.5% and 4% but equalized the base wage across all Home Improvement and Electronics departments. In 2011, commission rates on non-base items were cut by 2% in the electronics department. In late 2009, the electronic department's commission on "base items" was cut to 1%. As of 2017, appliances is the only remaining department where compensation is based entirely on commission. Other departments give a base pay plus commission. In many stores, jewelry department associates receive a low base salary with a 1% commission on their sales.

In March 2019, Sears said that it was ending life insurance benefits for an undisclosed number of its 90,000 retirees. A few months earlier, the company had handed out over $25 million in bonuses to executives. This key Sears Retiree Benefit was worth between $5,000 and $15,000 for most of the pool (29,000) of eligible retired employees.

In May 2019, former Sears Holdings chairman and CEO Eddie Lampert, months after purchasing the remains of Sears from the holding company, threatened not to pay out the $43 million in pension payments owed to 90,000 former Sears and Kmart employees and retirees. A Forbes editorial pointed out that Steven Mnuchin, Secretary of the Treasury at the time, was a board member of Sears Holding until 2016 and was, at the time, one of three directors of the Pension Benefit Guaranty Corporation, which manages administration of pensions for defunct or bankrupt businesses.

== Leadership ==
=== President ===
1. Richard W. Sears, 1886–1908
2. Julius Rosenwald, 1908–1924
3. Charles M. Kittle, 1924–1928
4. Robert E. Wood, 1928–1939
5. Thomas J. Carney, 1939–1942
6. Arthur S. Barrows, 1942–1946
7. Fowler B. McConnell, 1946–1958
8. Charles H. Kellstadt, 1958–1960
9. Crowdus Baker, 1960–1968
10. Arthur M. Wood, 1968–1973
11. A. Dean Swift, 1973–1981
12. Edward R. Telling, 1981–1982
13. Archie Boe, 1982–1986
14. Richard M. Jones, 1986–1988

=== Chairman of the board ===
1. Julius Rosenwald, 1924–1932
2. Lessing Rosenwald, 1932–1939
3. Robert E. Wood, 1939–1954
4. Theodore V. Houser, 1954–1958
5. Fowler B. McConnell, 1958–1960
6. Charles H. Kellstadt, 1960–1962
7. Austin T. Cushman, 1962–1967
8. Gordon M. Metcalf, 1967–1973
9. Arthur M. Wood, 1973–1978
10. Edward R. Telling, 1978–1981
11. Edward A. Brennan, 1981–1982
12. Edward R. Telling, 1982–1986
13. Edward A. Brennan, 1986–1995
14. Arthur C. Martinez, 1995-2000
15. Alan J. Lacy, 2000-2006

== Gallery ==
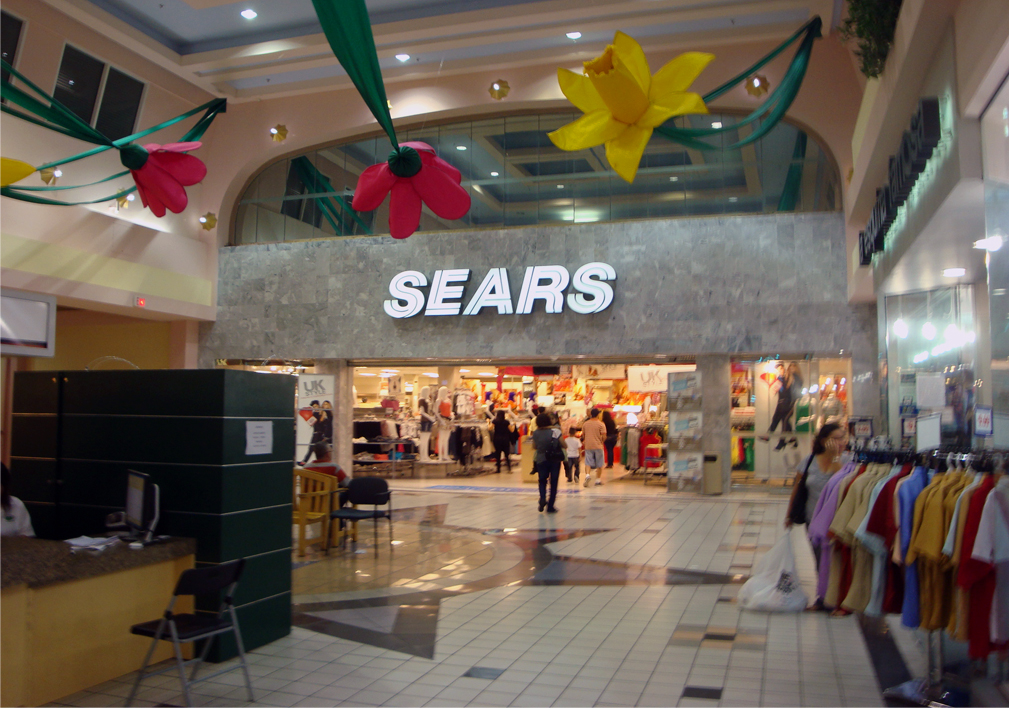
Mall entrance to the Sears store at Plaza del Norte in Hatillo, Puerto Rico, in 2011. This store closed in April 2021.

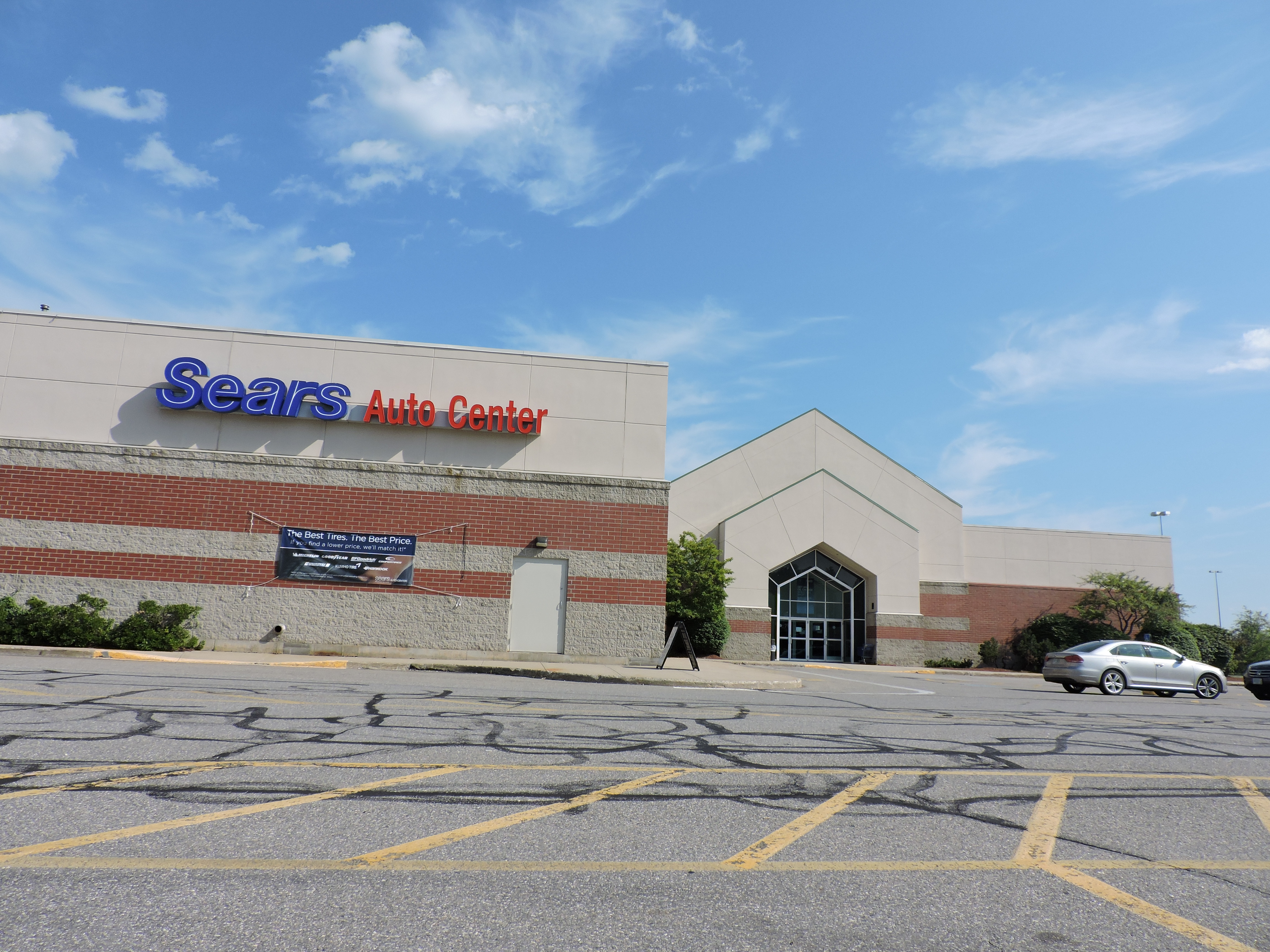
Sears Auto Center at Steeplegate Mall in Concord, New Hampshire, in 2017. The Auto Center and the main store at this location closed in February 2020.

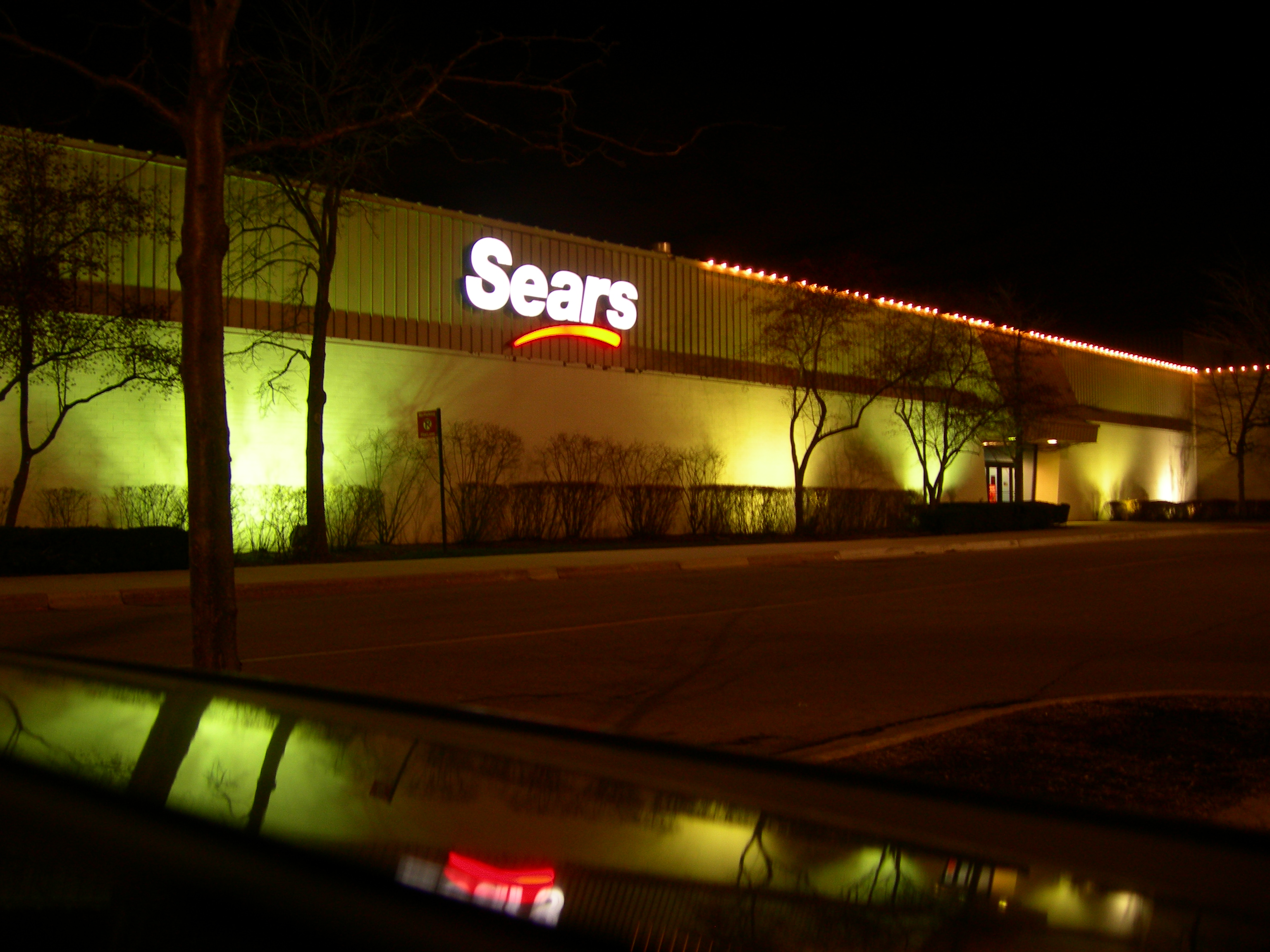
Exterior of the Sears at the Westfield Hawthorn in Vernon Hills, Illinois, in 2006. This location closed in September 2018 and was demolished in 2021.

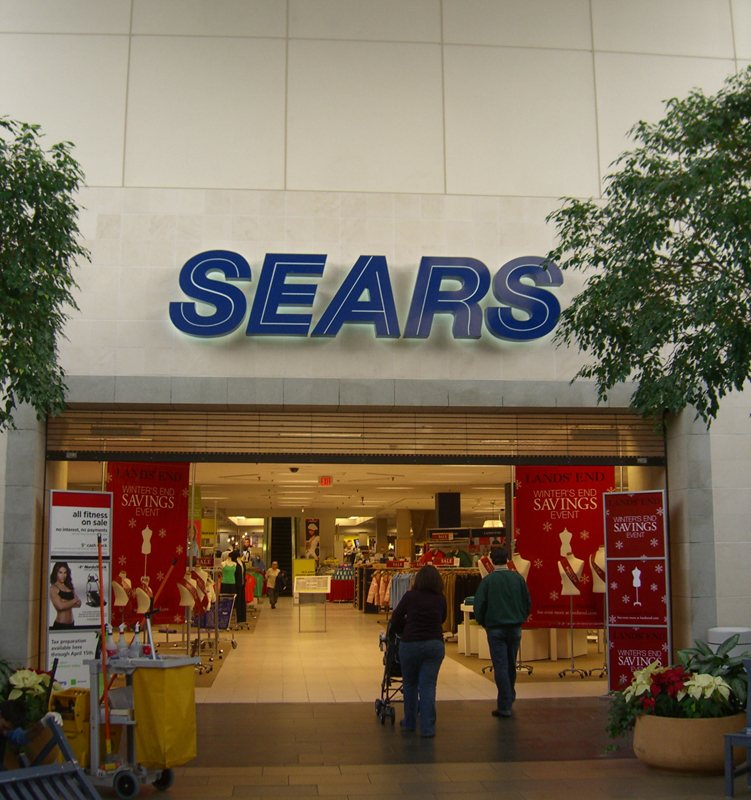
Mall entrance to the former Sears at Paramus Park in Paramus, New Jersey, in 2009. This location closed in 2018.

Sears, Roebuck and Company Warehouse and Service Center in Houston, Texas, in August 2020. On the National Register of Historic Places.

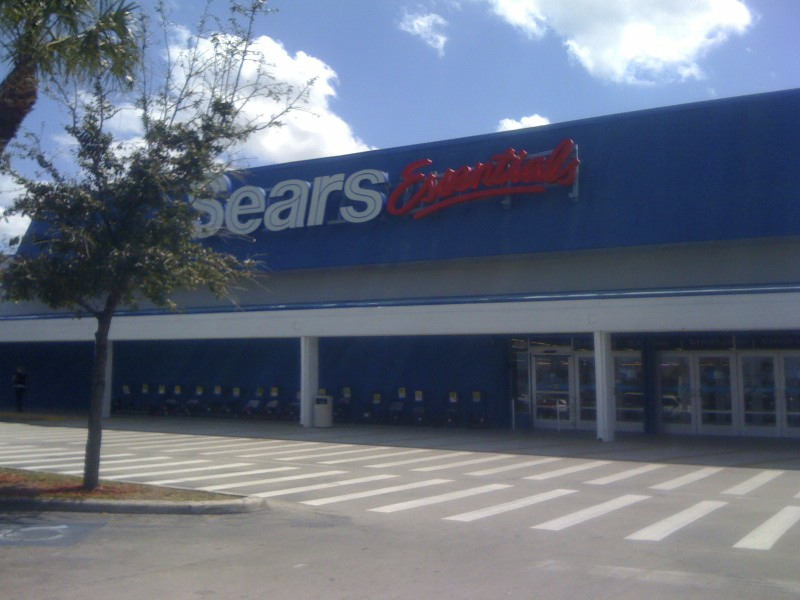
Exterior of the Sears Essentials in Palm Springs, Florida, in 2010; later reopened as Sears Outlet and closed once again in 2020

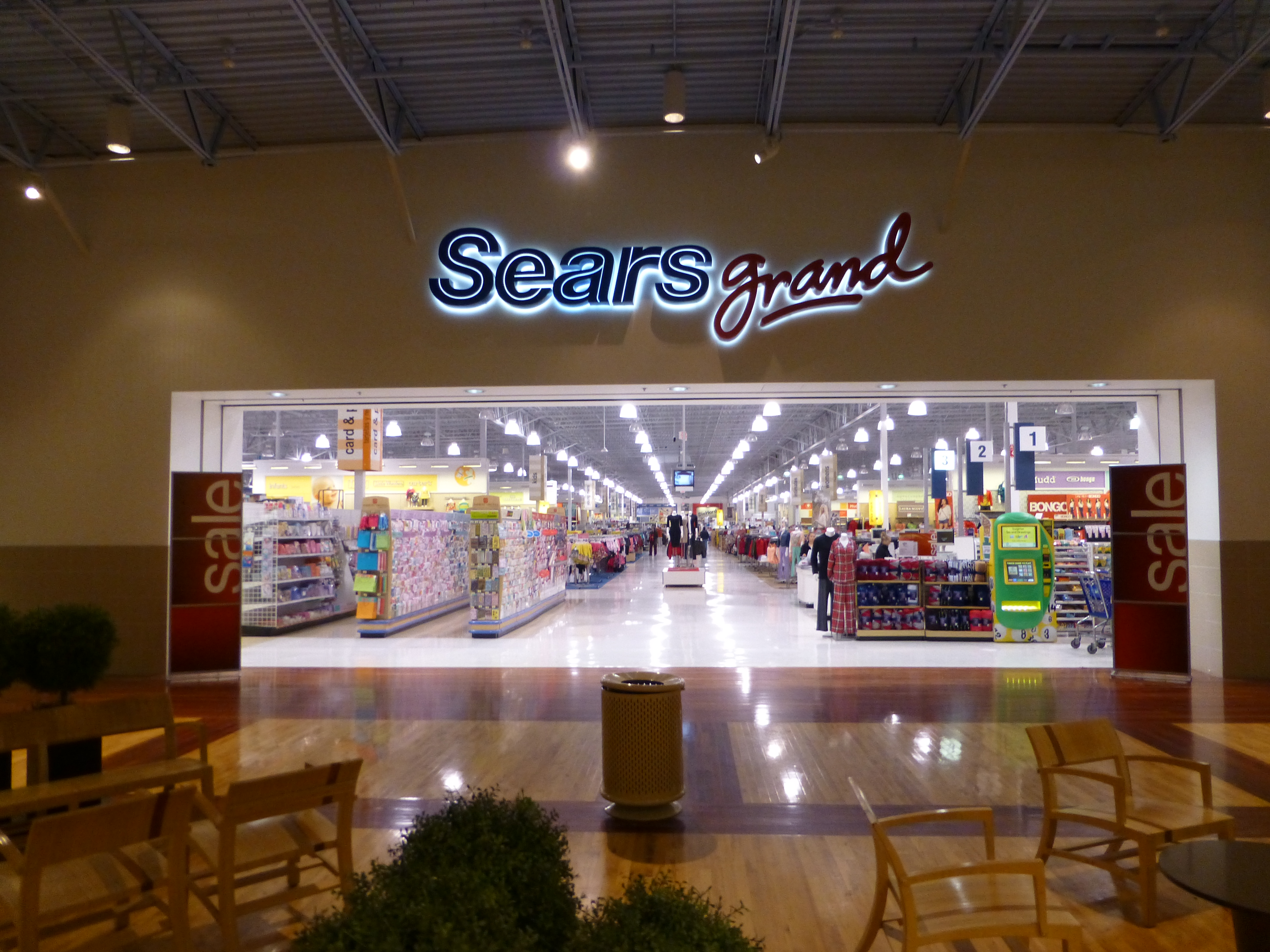
2013 photo of the mall entrance to the Sears Grand at Pittsburgh Mills in Tarentum, Pennsylvania. This Sears closed in January 2015.

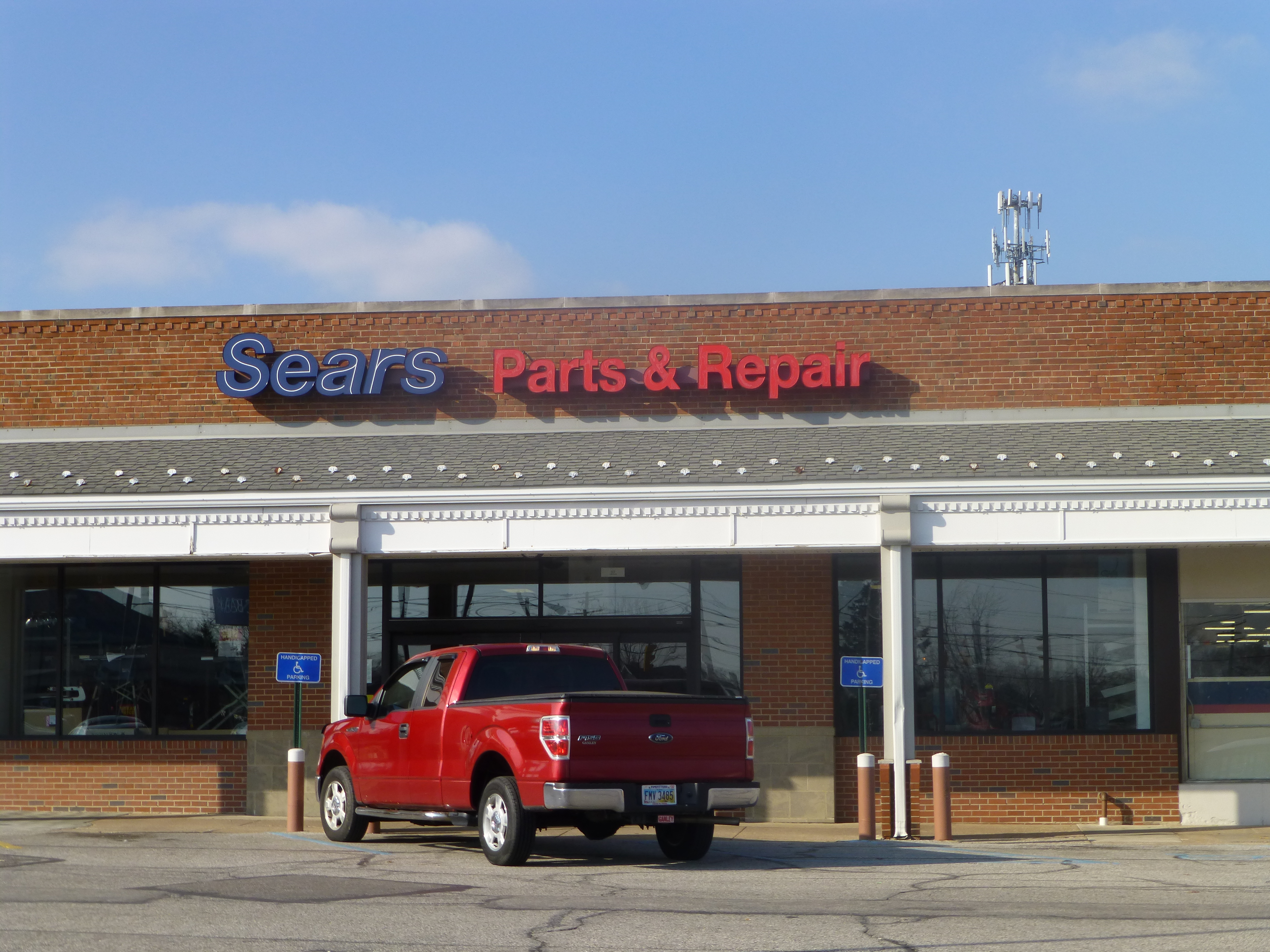
Exterior of the Sears Parts & Repair Store in Brooklyn, Ohio, in 2012

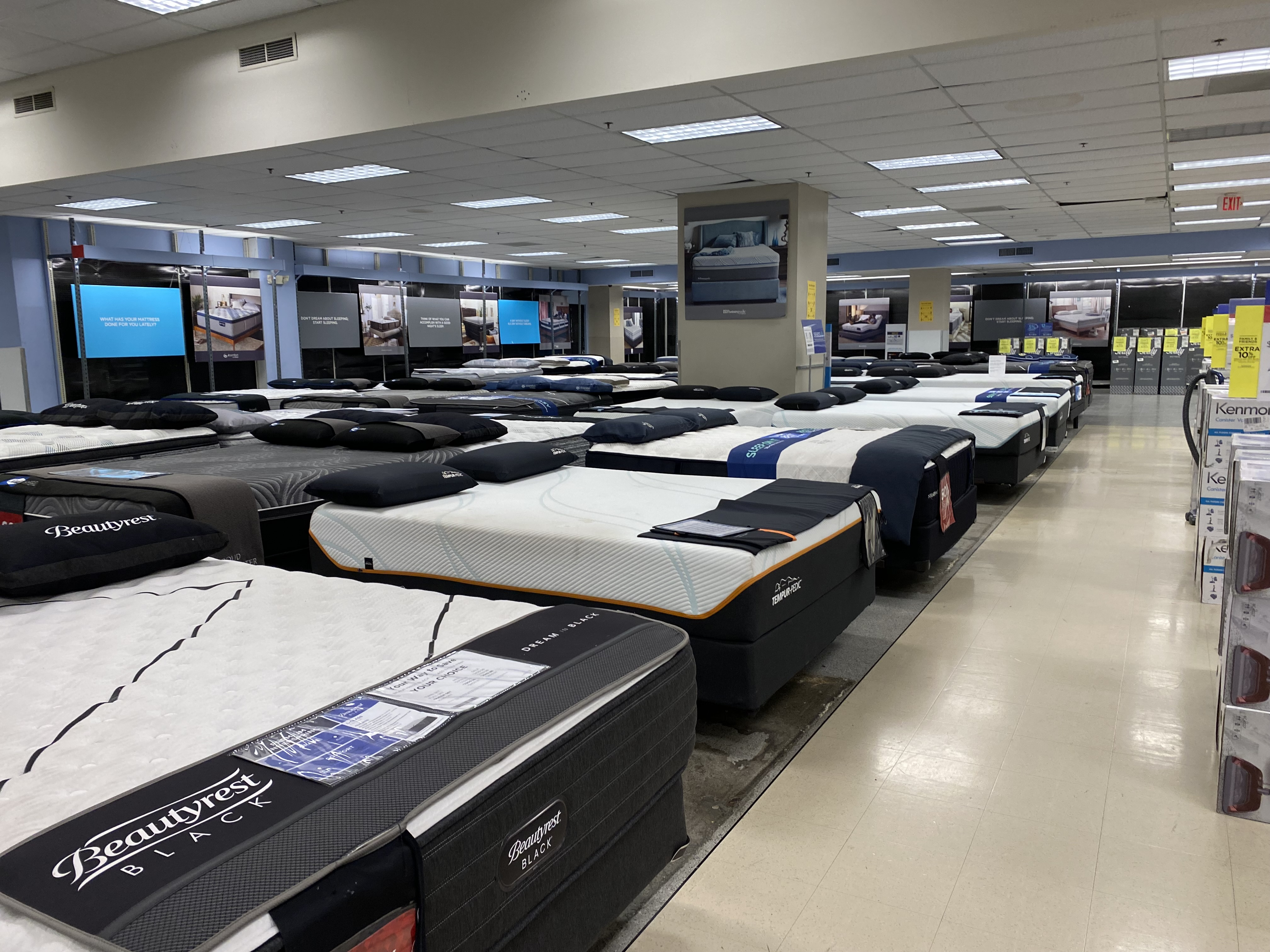
Inside a Sears Store at Coral Gables in Miami, Florida, in 2022, one of the few remaining Sears stores

== See also ==
- Retail apocalypse
