= Edward R. Telling =

Edward Riggs Telling (April 1, 1919 – October 19, 2005) was chairman and chief executive officer of Sears, Roebuck from 1978 to 1985 and led the company in expanding beyond retailing and insurance into financial services.

Telling was born in Danville, Illinois, where his father and uncles owned a bank that was forced to merge with a wealthier institution in the Depression. He won a football scholarship to Duke University but returned to Illinois Wesleyan University to be near his high-school sweetheart; his father withdrew his financial support and he worked his way through college, graduating in 1946. After service as a pilot in the Navy, he joined Sears in 1946, beginning at the Danville store.

Telling rose to manage the Eastern and then the Midwestern territories of the Sears retailing division, became Senior Executive Vice President for all Sears stores in 1976, then on February 1, 1978, became chairman and CEO of the company, succeeding Arthur Wood. At the request of the board of directors, he retired on December 31, 1985, rather than on his 65th birthday as expected under company rules; his successor, Edward A. Brennan, became president and chief operating officer of the company in August 1984.

Sears was beset by crises at the start of Telling's chairmanship. Although during the first four years of his tenure the company's situation continued to worsen and business publications described him as one of the worst corporate executives, when he left it was again on a sound footing. He reorganized the company, changing its internal culture to introduce central control and planning, and diversified it to create a conglomerate, acquiring both the Dean Witter Reynolds brokerage firm and the Coldwell Banker real estate agency in the same week, and in the last year of his tenure launching the Discover Card. He received honorary Doctor of Law degrees from Illinois Wesleyan University in 1978 and from St. Norbert College in 1985. He served on the boards of companies including American Can, Philadelphia National Bank, Illinois Tool Works, Kraft, Cox Enterprises and Premark International.

He died of cancer in North Palm Beach, Florida.
