= Aaron Nusbaum =

American entrepreneur and philanthropist (1859–1936)

Aaron E. Nusbaum
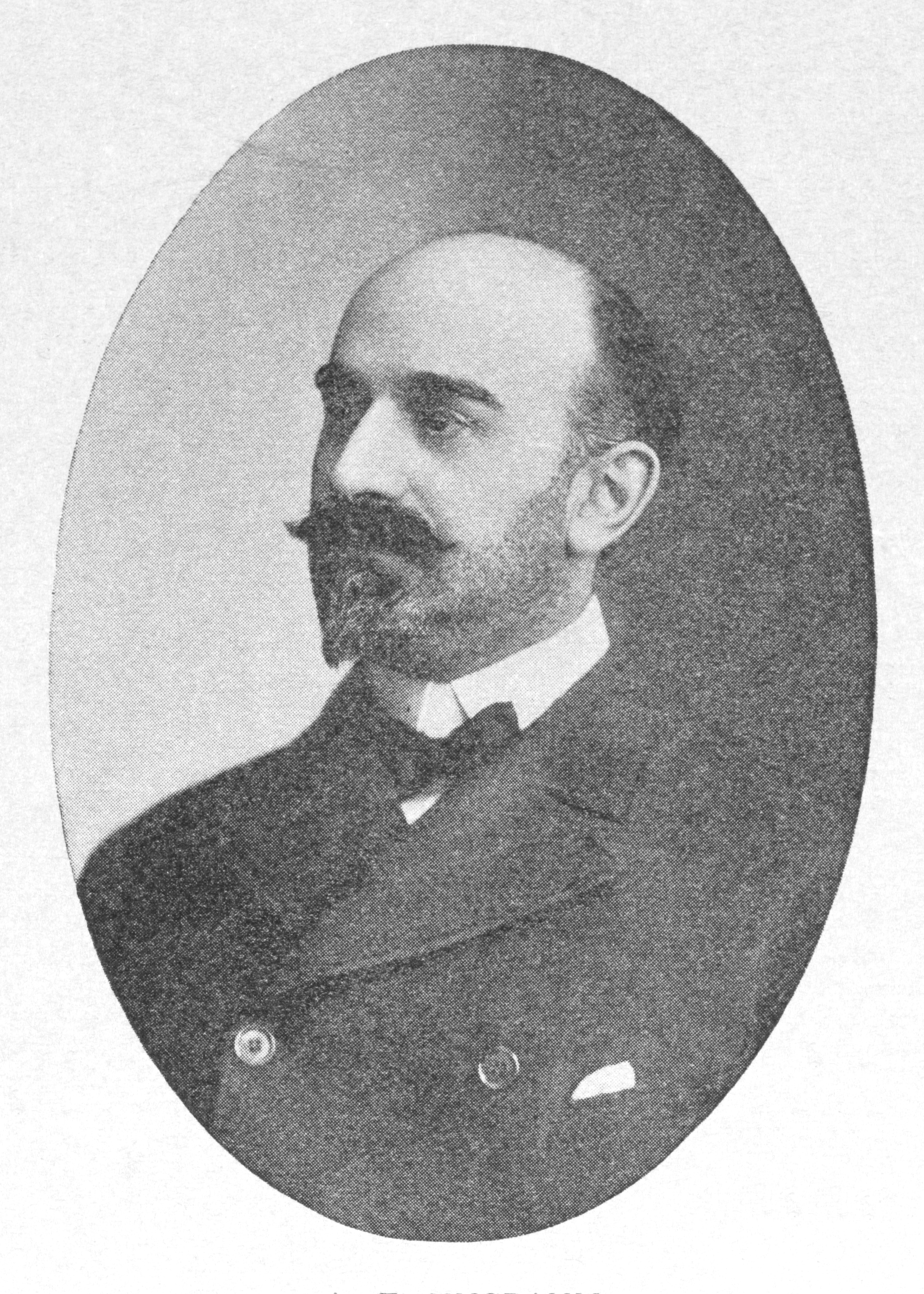
- Born: January 8, 1859; New York City, NY
- Died: July 1, 1936 (aged 77); Westchester, NY
- Other names: Aaron E. Norman
- Occupations: entrepreneur; philanthropist

Aaron E. Nusbaum (January 8, 1859 – July 1, 1936), later Aaron Norman, was an American entrepreneur and philanthropist who is best known as one of the two men who acquired 50% of the stock in the fledgling Sears, Roebuck and Co. from Richard Sears and started it on the road to becoming a retail giant.

== Early career ==
Aaron Edward Nusbaum was born in New York City to Emanuel Nusbaum and Regina Stonehill. Nusbaums were of German immigrants of Jewish descent.

By 1893 he was a successful businessman in Chicago and earned his first fortune when he obtained a concession to sell soda water soft drinks at the World’s Columbian Exposition. He received the contract by doing a favor for Marshall Field, a member of the Fair’s planning commission. His profit for the summer’s work was $150,000.00. ($3,750,000.00 in 2010). He invested part of that money in Bastedo Tube Company, a pneumatic tube manufacturer whose product is used to deliver messages and money in department stores between floors and departments. A sales call in 1895 led to his investment in Sears.

== Purchase of Sears ==
In 1895 Nusbaum had a meeting with Richard Sears, the co-founder of Sears Roebuck and Company. Nusbaum thought the meeting would involve selling pneumatic tubes to Sears however Richard Sears had other plans. The company was short of cash and Sears offered to sell Nusbaum half of the company for $75,000.00. In 1890 Julius Rosenwald had married Augusta Nusbaum, Aaron's sister. Nusbaum asked his brother-in-law if he would be willing to buy a quarter of Sears Roebuck for $37,500.00. Rosenwald agreed and they paid Richard Sears $75,000.00 for one-half interest in Sears Roebuck and Company. The sale took place in 1895 and at that time the company was grossing about $800,000.00 a year. By 1900 that figure had grown to $11,000,000.00.

In 1901 Sears and Rosenwald had a dispute with Nusbaum, bought him out for $1.25 million and Nusbaum resigned as Secretary and Treasurer. He was succeeded as Secretary by the company’s outside lawyer, Albert Henry Loeb of Loeb & Adler (now known as Arnstein & Lehr, LLP) who had prepared the papers for Nusbaum’s departure and had also structured the original sale to Nusbaum and Rosenwald and the incorporation of Sears in Illinois. The decision to oust Nusbaum was difficult for Rosenwald. Despite repeated attempts by his wife Gussie for reconciliation, Nusbaum never spoke again with his brother-in-law or sister.

== Later years ==
After Nusbaum left Sears, he took an extended trip to Europe. On returning, he changed his name to Aaron Norman and his investments added to his wealth. He founded Abacus & Associates, a wealth investment firm, which is still operated by his family. Upon his death in 1936, Nusbaum willed a million dollars to the Assistance Fund, Inc, a New York charitable organization.
