= Edward A. Brennan =

American businessman (1934–2007)

- Born: January 16, 1934; Chicago, Illinois, U.S.
- Died: December 27, 2007 (aged 73); Burr Ridge, Illinois, U.S.
- Known for: CEO of Sears, Roebuck, & Co.
- Spouse: Lois Lyon
- Children: 6
- Awards: Call of Lincoln

Edward A. Brennan (January 16, 1934 – December 27, 2007) was chairman of the board, president (1980–1995) and chief executive officer (1984–1995) of Sears, Roebuck and Co.

Edward Brennan was born in Chicago into a family of Sears associates: his grandfather, father and uncles all worked there, and his younger brother, Bernard F. Brennan, left Sears for the rival Chicago-based retailer Montgomery Ward and became its CEO in 1985. His mother, who also worked at Sears, left the family and went to Mexico when he was young; he worked after school to pay for bus trips with his brother to visit her.

He attended Marquette University while working for Benson and Rixon, a menswear store where he had started work at 15 and where he rose to be a high-level manager before joining Sears in 1956. In March 1980 his predecessor as CEO, Edward R. Telling, appointed him president with the task of reinvigorating the company's stores. In October of that year, he was a passenger aboard the cruise vessel Prinsendam in the Gulf of Alaska when its engine room caught fire and the order was given to abandon ship. All 520 passengers and crew were rescued without loss of life or serious injury.

The following January the managerial structure was changed and he became chairman and CEO of the Sears Merchandise Group subsidiary of the company, a position he held until being appointed CEO of the company in August 1984, after which he also served as president again until Telling's retirement from the position of chairman of the board on January 1, 1986. During his first period as president and his chairmanship of the merchandising division, he turned around the performance of the company's stores by introducing "challenge sales" and by building and renovating Sears stores in a scientifically developed "Store of the Future" format, while closing aged and under-performing stores including the original Chicago store. As CEO, although in 1985 he presided over the introduction of the Discover Card, the first new major credit card in twenty years, during the 1990s he dismantled the conglomerate that Telling had assembled, spinning off Discover, Dean Witter, Coldwell Banker, the Sears Mortgage Banking Group, and also Allstate Insurance, which was founded in 1931 as part of Sears. During his chairmanship, the company also mortgaged and ultimately gave up and moved out of its headquarters, the Sears Tower.

Brennan also served on the boards of 3M, Exelon, McDonald's, and AMR Corporation, where he was chairman of the board in 2003–04 and enabled the company to avoid bankruptcy.

== Awards ==
Brennan was inducted as a Laureate of The Lincoln Academy of Illinois and awarded the Order of Lincoln (the State's highest honor) by the Governor of Illinois in 2005 in the area Business and Social Service.

Brennan died on the evening of December 27, 2007, at his home in Burr Ridge, Illinois.
