= Edificio La Nacional =

Coordinates: 19°26′03″N 99°08′28″W

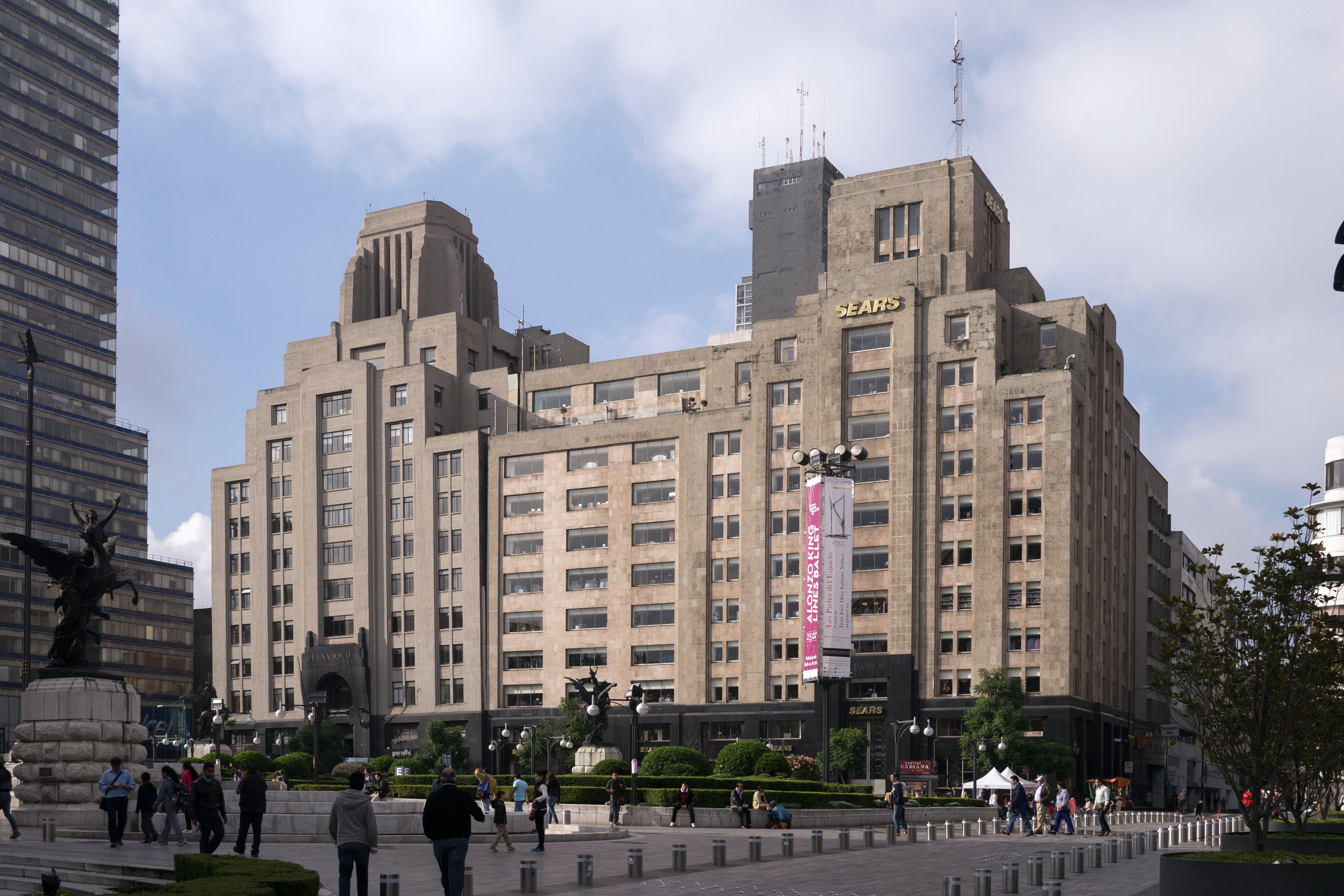
- Edificio La Nacional I (left) and II (right)
- Interactive map of the Edificio La Nacional area

General information
- Construction started: 1929
- Completed: 1932

Height
- Height: 56 metres (184 ft)

Technical details
- Floor count: 13

Design and construction
- Architect: Manuel Ortiz Monasterio

Edificio La Nacional is an Art Deco office building located in Avenida Juárez, in the Historical Centre of Mexico City, just across the street from Palacio de Bellas Artes. The building's architect was Manuel Ortiz Monasterio, former director of the Escuela Nacional de Arquitectura. It is considered to be the first building over 10 stories in Mexico.

The building was built between 1929 and 1932. It is known as "La Nacional" because it was originally home to the National Insurance Company (La Companía Nacional de Seguros). It was the tallest building in Mexico City until Edificio Corcuera was built in 1937. It stands 56 meters and 13 floors, served by five elevators. Its steel frame was designed to withstand the strong earthquakes that regularly shake the city. Total building area is 15,000 square metres (160,000 sq ft). It suffered some damage but survived the 1957 and 1985 earthquakes that took place in Mexico City, but was slightly damaged in the 2012 Oaxaca-Guerrero earthquake.

The building next to it, known as "La Nacional II" and considered an annex, was built in 1949 and contains a Sears store. The eight floor houses a popular café, that offers views to Palacio de Bellas Artes and Alameda Park.
