= Richard Warren Sears =

American businessman, founder of Sears

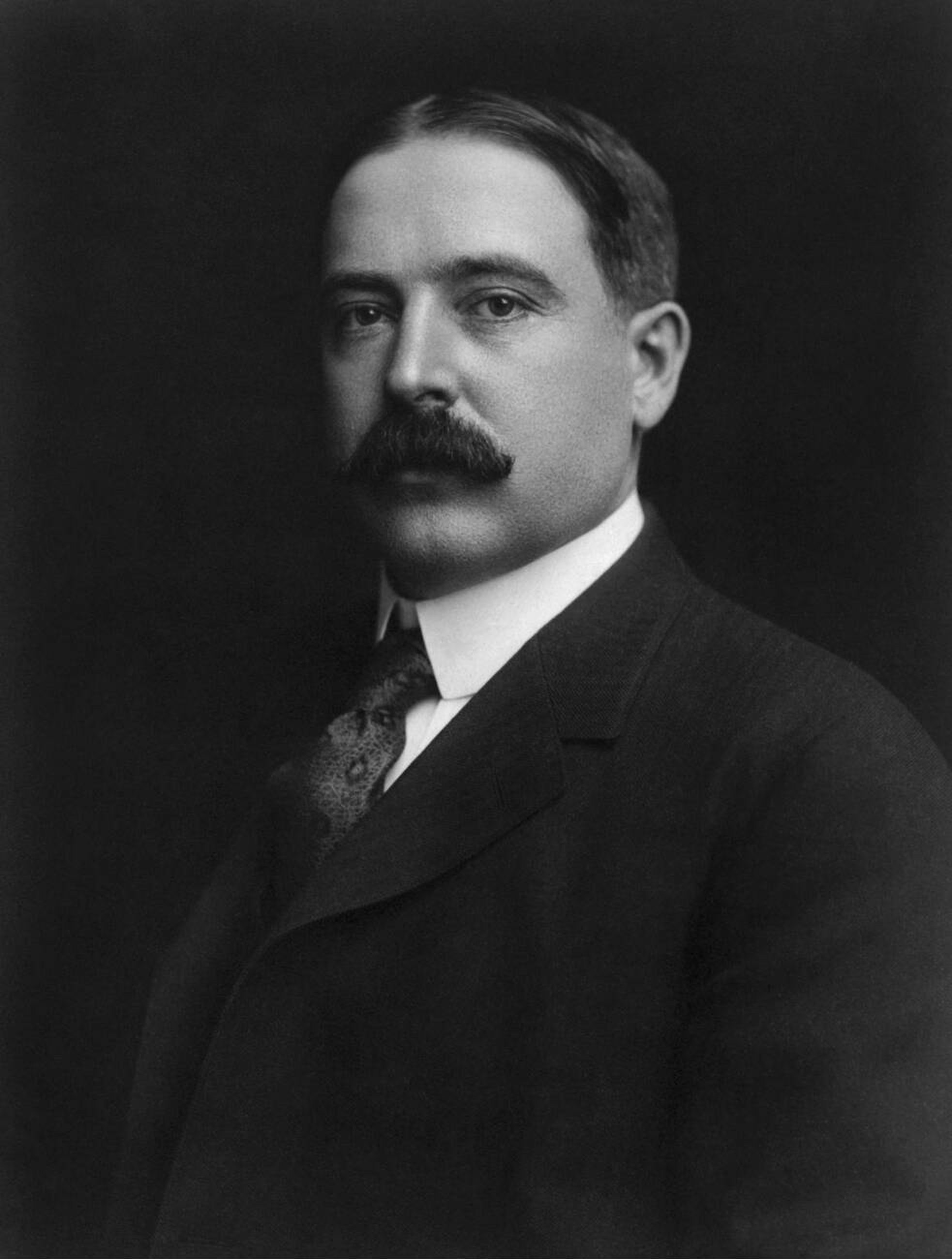
- Born: December 7, 1863; Stewartville, Minnesota, US
- Died: September 28, 1914 (aged 50); Waukesha, Wisconsin, US
- Occupation: Businessman
- Years active: 1886–1908
- Known for: Co-founder of department store Sears, Roebuck and Company

Richard Warren Sears (December 7, 1863 – September 28, 1914) was an American businessman who co-founded the department store Sears, Roebuck and Company with his partner Alvah Curtis Roebuck.

== Early life ==
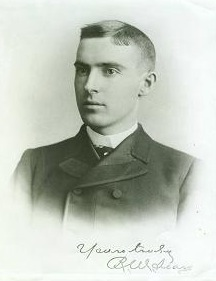
Sears as a young man

Sears was born in Stewartville, Minnesota. His father was James Warren Sears, born circa 1828 in New York, a blacksmith and wagon-maker; his mother was Eliza Burton, born in Ohio circa 1843. The family was living in Spring Valley, Minnesota, by June 1870, where his father served as a city councilman and eventually sold his wagon shop in 1875. Both of his parents were of English descent. During his boyhood in Spring Valley, he befriended Almanzo Wilder, the future husband of Laura Ingalls Wilder. In 1880, he started working as a telegraph operator in the town of North Branch, Minnesota, for the Minneapolis and St. Louis Railway, and was later transferred to North Redwood Falls, Minnesota, to be station agent there.

== Businessman ==
In 1886, when Sears was 23, his station received a shipment of gold watches from a Chicago manufacturer, but the local consignee, jeweller Edward Stegerson, refused the unsolicited shipment.

A common scam existing at the time involved wholesalers who would ship their products to retailers who had not ordered them. Upon refusal, the wholesaler would offer the already price-hiked items to the retailer at a lower consignment cost in the guise of alleviating the cost to ship the items back. The unsuspecting retailer would then agree to take this new-found bargain off the wholesaler's hands, mark up the items and sell them to the public, making a small profit in the transaction.

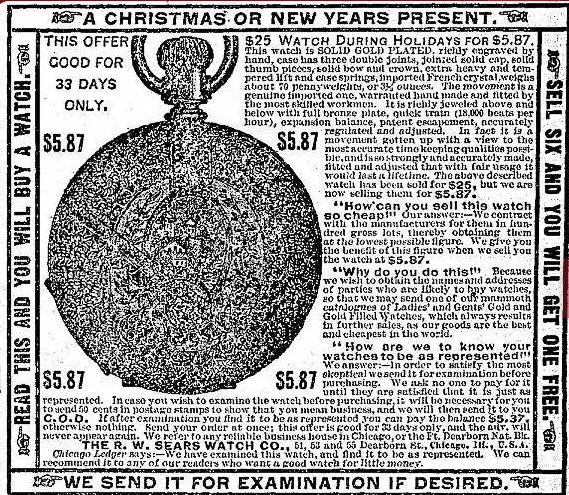
R.W. Sears Watch Co. advertisement, 1888

But Stegerson, a retailer savvy to the scam, flatly refused the watches. Young Sears jumped at the opportunity, and made an agreement with the wholesaler to keep any profit he reaped above $12, and then he set about offering his wares to other station agents along the railroad line for $14. The watches were considered an item of urban sophistication. Also because of the growth of railways, and the recent application of time zones, farmers and railroads needed to keep time accurately which had not been necessary until then. For those two reasons the station agents had no trouble selling the watches to passers-by.

Within six months, Sears had netted $5,000 and felt so confident in this venture that he moved to Minneapolis and founded the R. W. Sears Watch Company. He began placing advertisements in farm publications and mailing flyers to potential clients. From the beginning, it was clear that Sears had a talent for writing promotional copy. He took the personal approach in his ads, speaking directly to rural and small-town communities, persuading them to purchase by mail-order.

== Chicago ==
In 1887, Sears moved his company to Chicago, an important transportation center for the Midwestern United States, and moved his residence to nearby Oak Park, Illinois. In 1887 he also hired watch repairman Alvah Curtis Roebuck to repair any watches being returned. Roebuck was Sears's first employee, and he later became co-founder of Sears, Roebuck & Company, which was formed in 1891 when Sears was 28 years old. In 1895 the company was short of cash and Roebuck had left the business. Sears sold one half of the company for $75,000.00 to Aaron Nusbaum and his brother-in-law, Julius Rosenwald. The company was incorporated in Illinois as Sears Roebuck & Co. of Illinois on September 7, 1895. Richard Sears retired in 1908 at age 44 and Julius Rosenwald became the President.

The first Sears catalog was published in 1893 and offered only watches. By 1897, items such as men's and ladies clothing, plows, silverware, bicycles and athletic equipment had been added to the offering.

The 500-page catalog was sent to some 300,000 homes. Sears catered to the rural customer because, having been raised on a farm, he knew what the rural customer needed. He also had experience working with the railroad and he knew how to ship merchandise to remote areas.

In 1908 Sears made another move forward and began to sell mail order homes through the catalogs.

== Death ==
In 1908 Sears retired and moved from Oak Park to Lake Bluff, Illinois, suffering from failing health due to alcoholism. Six years later, he died in Waukesha, Wisconsin, of Bright's disease.

== Legacy ==
Sears's birthplace in Stewartville is listed on the National Register of Historic Places.

Sears was inducted into the Junior Achievement U.S. Business Hall of Fame in 1892.
