= Saul Ewing =

United States-based law firm

Saul Ewing LLP
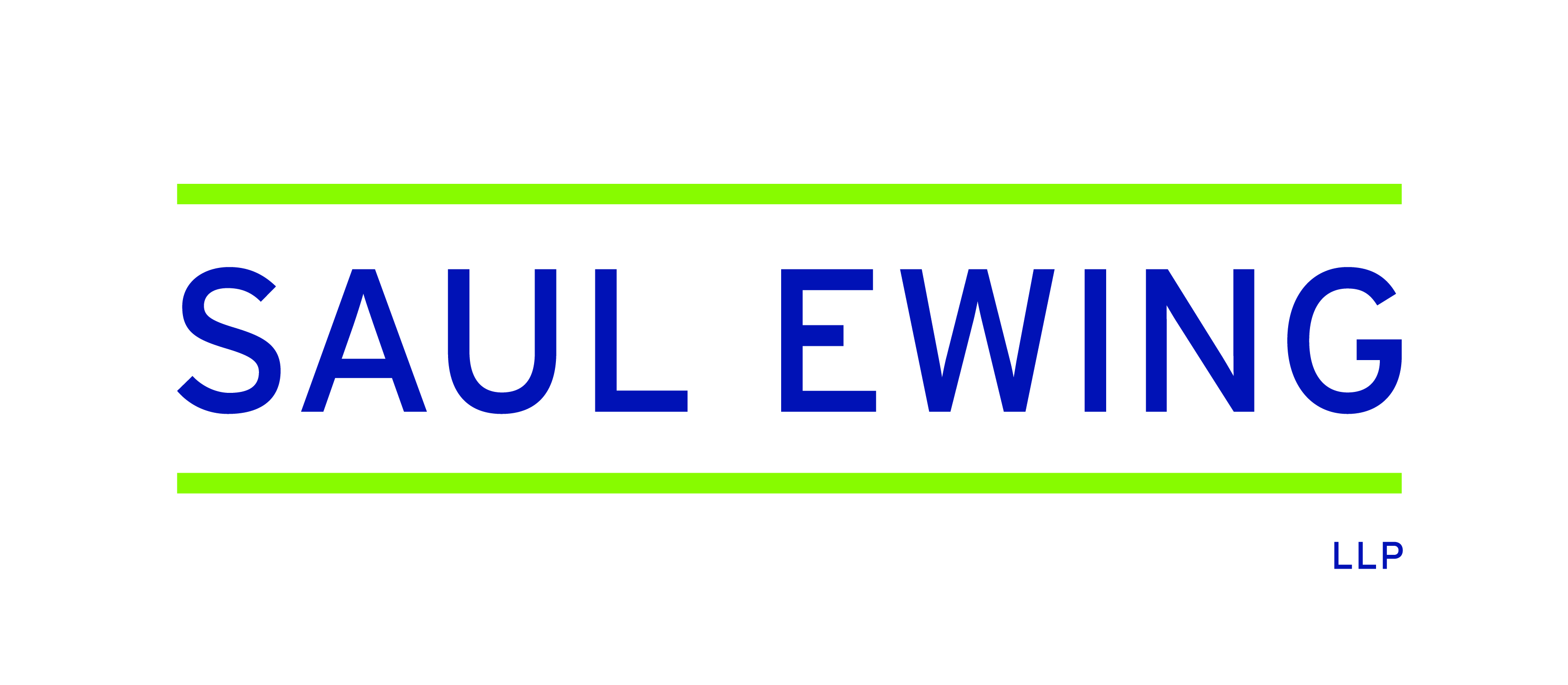
- Headquarters: Centre Square II; Philadelphia, Pennsylvania
- No. of offices: 18
- No. of attorneys: more than 450
- Major practice areas: Litigation, Corporate, Bankruptcy, Real Estate
- Key people: Jason St. John, Managing Partner
- Date founded: 1921
- Company type: Limited liability partnership
- Website: www.saul.com

Saul Ewing LLP is a U.S.-based law firm with 18 offices and more than 450 attorneys providing a broad range of legal services. Its offices are located along the East Coast from Boston to Miami and extend into the Midwest by way of Chicago. On September 1, 2017, Saul Ewing LLP and Arnstein & Lehr LLP merged to form Saul Ewing Arnstein & Lehr LLP.

== History ==
In 1921, Maurice Bower Saul began Saul, Ewing, Remick & Saul, along with his brother, Walter Biddle Saul, Joseph Ewing and Raymond Remick.

The partners worked with many of the clients served by John G. Johnson, the leader of the Philadelphia bar who had died in 1917. Over the years, the firm continued to grow, expanding outside of Pennsylvania in 1982 with an office in Wilmington, Delaware. By 1998, the firm attained regional status, with offices in Pennsylvania, New Jersey, Delaware and Maryland. In 2000, the firm shortened its name to Saul Ewing and became a limited liability partnership. The firm expanded with offices in Boston, Massachusetts in 2011 and Pittsburgh, Pennsylvania in 2012.

In 2017, the firm completed its largest merger to date, combining with Chicago-based Arnstein & Lehr LLP, an established, 125-year-old firm, known for its litigation, bankruptcy and real estate practices. The merger added four offices in Illinois and Florida and 160 attorneys.

== Notable cases and deals ==
- Saul Ewing represented International Speedway Corporation (ISC) in its $2 billion going private merger with NASCAR Holdings, Inc., with ISC becoming a wholly owned subsidiary of NASCAR. International Speedway owns and operates 13 racetracks and motorsports facilities, including Daytona International Speedway in Florida, home of the Daytona 500 race, and Talladega Superspeedway in Alabama.
- The firm represented Allegheny County Airport Authority in litigation with the master concessionaire at the Pittsburgh International Airport over the failure to adequately fulfil its contractual obligations.
