= Sears Hometown and Outlet Stores =

American retailer

Sears Hometown and Outlet Stores Inc.
- Type: Public
- Traded as: Nasdaq: SHOS (2012–2019); Russell Microcap Index component
- Founded: April 23, 2012; 14 years ago
- Defunct: October 23, 2019; 7 years ago (original spinoff)
- Fate: Sears Outlet acquired by Franchise Group with the rest of the company acquired by Transform Holdco.
- Headquarters: Hoffman Estates, Illinois
- Number of locations: 491 Hometown (June 2019); 126 Outlet (June 2019)
- Area served: United States (49 states, Puerto Rico), Bermuda
- Key people: Will Powell (CEO)
- Revenue: $1.719 billion (2017)
- Subsidiaries: Sears Appliance and Hardware; Sears Home Appliance Showrooms; Sears Hometown; Sears Outlet
- Website: Last snapshot of archived website

Sears Hometown and Outlet Stores Inc. was an American retail company that sold home appliances, lawn & garden equipment, apparel, mattresses, sporting goods, and tools. The company had four subsidiary store formats: Sears Hometown, Sears Outlet, Sears Hardware and Appliance, and Sears Home Appliance Showrooms. Sears Hometown and Outlet Stores was based in Hoffman Estates, Illinois. Sears Hometown and Outlet Stores was founded in April 2012. The company was spun off from Sears Holdings in 2012. By May 2019, Sears Hometown and Outlet Stores & its independent dealers & franchisees operated a total of 639 stores across 49 states as well as in Puerto Rico & Bermuda. On June 3, 2019, it was announced that Transform Holdco would acquire Sears Hometown and Outlet Stores. As per the deal, Sears Hometown needed to divest its Sears Outlet division to gain approval. The company ceased to exist on October 23, 2019, when Franchise Group acquired the Sears Outlet division and Transform Holdco acquired the rest of the company.

The company's former subsidiary, Sears Hometown remained in business as an American retail brand of hardware and appliance stores and a Transform Holdco subsidiary with most stores being locally owned and operated franchises.

== History ==
Sears Holdings spun off Sears Hometown and Outlet Stores in 2012 to attempt to restore profitability and raise shareholder confidence. Sears Holdings spun off more than 1,100 Hometown and 122 outlet stores. Hometown stores are small hardware and appliance stores operated by independent retailers. Outlet stores sell Sears merchandise at discount. Outlet stores are approximately 18,000 square feet and equipped with items such as home appliances, lawn and garden equipment, apparel, mattresses, sporting goods and tools. Outlet stores sell discontinued, used, cosmetically blemished or reconditioned merchandise with new parts.

Sears Hometown and Outlet Stores partnered with the National Volunteer Fire Council in November 2013 to raise money for local fire departments. The objective of the campaign was to provide firehouses with funds to improve resources for training, equipment, and financial support.

When former parent Sears Holdings filed for Chapter 11 bankruptcy protection on October 15, 2018, Sears Hometown and Outlet Stores was not affected due to having been spun off from Sears since 2012.

In April 2019, it was announced that Transform Holdco would acquire the company as a result of its subsidiary Sears opening up 3 Sears Home & Life stores by May 2019.

However it was reported a few days later that Sears Hometown and Outlet Stores acquisition offer was rejected, as a result, Sears Hometown and Outlet Stores might face liquidation, having a similar fate to Sears Holdings but which got acquired by ESL Investments a few months ago, but its biggest shareholder Eddie Lampert is trying to save the company from liquidation and hopefully continue the acquisition process.

In June 2019, it was finally announced that Transform Holdco will acquire the remaining shares in the company. As per deal, Sears Hometown and Outlet Stores might need to divest its Sears Outlet division to gain approval. At the time announcement, Sears Hometown and Outlet Stores had 491 Hometown stores and 126 Outlet stores in 49 states, Puerto Rico and Bermuda.

In August 2019, Franchise Group, the parent of Liberty Tax, announced plans to acquire Sears Outlet division from Sears Hometown and Outlet Stores to help fulfill Transform Holdco's requirement in Transform Holdco's acquisition of Sears Hometown and Outlet Stores.

On October 23, 2019, Sears Hometown and Outlet Stores completed its sale of Sears Outlet and Buddy's Home Furnishing businesses to Franchise Group. Transform Holdco completed the acquisition of the remainder of Sears Hometown at the end of the same business day. Stores that were acquired by Franchise Group were re-branded into American Freight stores.

On December 13, 2022, Sears Hometown filed for Chapter 11 bankruptcy. It was later revealed that all remaining Sears Hometown stores would be liquidated and permanently closed. Sears Hometown converted its Chapter 11 case to a Chapter 7 bankruptcy liquidation in February 2023 after losing cash access from PNC Bank that would have helped the company throughout its reorganization.

=== Finances ===
Year	Revenue in thousands USD	Net income in thousands USD	Total Assets in thousands USD	Employees	Stores
2013	2,453,606	60,080	785,803	4,935	1,245
2014	2,421,562	35,550	847,185	4,485	1,260
2015	2,356,033	−168,805	645,722	3,634	1,260
2016	2,287,788	−27,261	633,833	4,053	1,160
2017	2,070,056	−131,919	468,426	3,600	1,020
2018	1,719,951	−95,057	412,688	2,962	900

== Subsidiaries ==
=== Sears Hometown Stores ===
Sears Hometown stores were independently owned stores that sell Sears merchandise. In 2013, 70–80% of Hometown stores were independently owned. Formerly Sears Dealer Stores, they are a chain of smaller stores that operate as a store where the proprietor owns or leases the real estate while Sears Hometown and Outlet Stores handles the marketing and owns the inventory, and there are no franchising fees levied against the store proprietor. These stores are usually located in smaller markets that do not support full-sized Sears. They are signed as Sears and are usually free-standing or located in strip malls. They primarily concentrate on hardware, appliances and lawn-and-garden supplies. Most of Hometown Stores carry Sears brand products, such as Kenmore, Craftsman, and DieHard, as well as a wide assortment of other national brands. Primarily independently owned and averaging 8,500 square feet, Hometown Stores are designed to serve customers within their local communities. By August 2019, there were 393 Hometown Stores in operation just prior to their sale to Transform Holdco. In May 2022, it was announced that roughly 100 more Sears Hometown stores would close permanently, This came shortly after the company announced plans to close 70 Hometown stores. By September 2022 the number of remaining stores was less than 150. On December 13, 2022, Sears Hometown filed for Chapter 11 bankruptcy. It was later revealed that all remaining Sears Hometown stores would be liquidated and permanently closed.

=== Sears Outlet Store ===
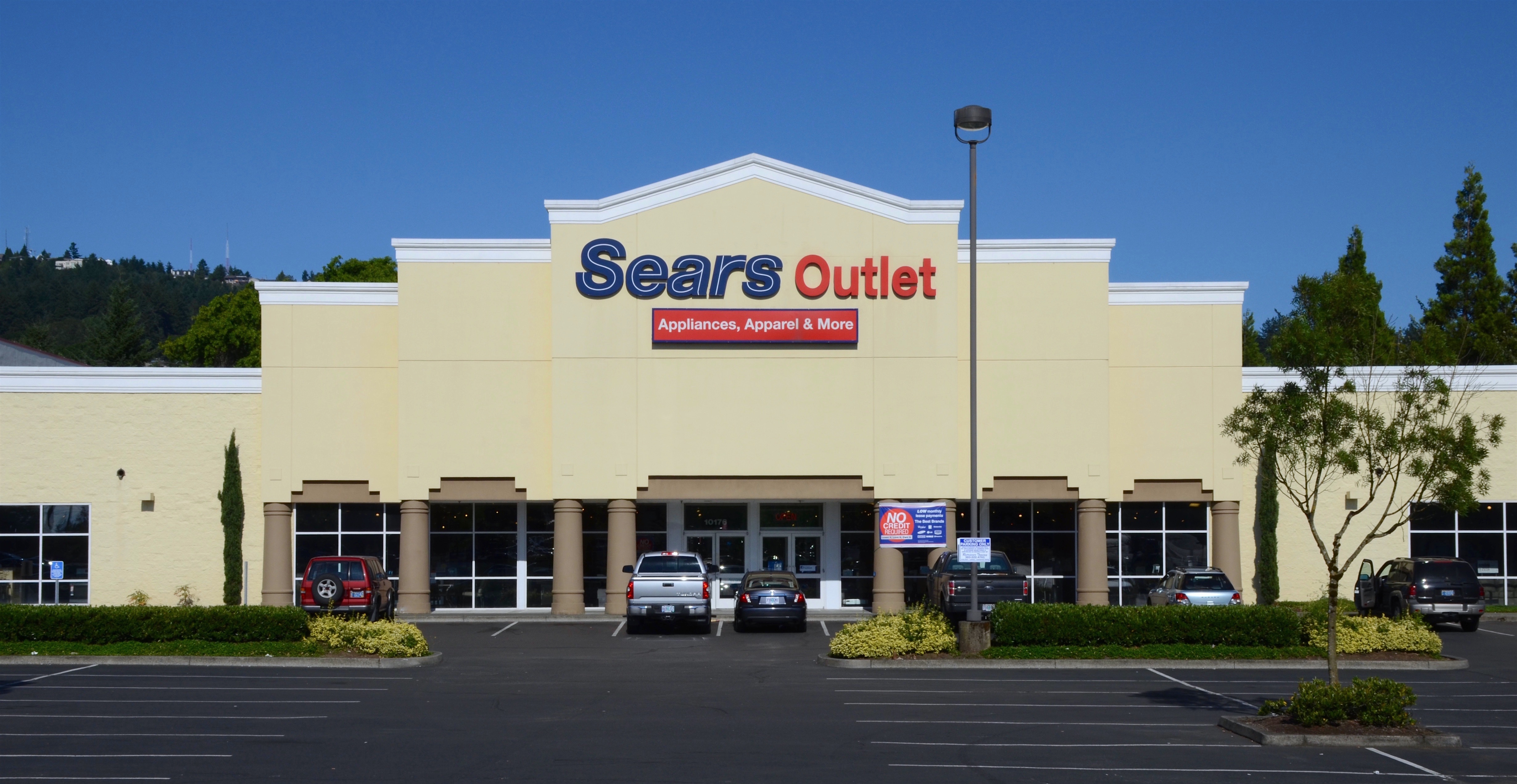
A Sears Outlet store near Portland, Oregon, in 2017

An outlet version of Sears department stores located in various retail locations across the U.S., as well as online. The stores sell appliances, apparel, mattresses, sporting goods, tools, and lawn and garden equipment. Sears Outlet provides in-store and online access to new, one-of-a-kind, out-of-carton, discontinued, obsolete, used, reconditioned, overstocked, and scratch-and-dented merchandise at a discounted price (at twenty to sixty percent off regular retail price) Each store, on average, is larger than 18,000 square feet in size.

In 1968, Sears opened a surplus store in Kansas City. In 1994, the surplus stores were renamed to Sears Outlet. In 1995, Sears Outlet restructured in order to manage repairs and product distribution from a centralized location. To do this, they established a series of facilities known as Outlet Repair and Distribution Centers. In 2015, there were 22 of these centers in operation. In 2008, apparel was introduced to Sears Outlet stores and served as a liquidation outlet for Lands' End. In 2009, SearsOutlet.com was launched as an e-commerce platform allowing customers to purchase items online and in 2011, nationwide delivery was offered.

In 2012, Sears Hometown and Outlet Stores was spun off from Sears Holdings. At the time of the separation, there were 122 Sears Outlet Stores in operation. By February 2014, Sears Outlet stores had expanded its operations to 143 locations. The majority of Sears Outlet stores are company-operated (115) and 28 Sears Outlet stores are locally owned and operated by franchisees. Sears Hometown and Outlet Stores initiated a program to franchise Sears Outlet stores in 2012. In 2013, home appliances made up 78% of Sears Outlet's sales revenue and total revenue from Sears Outlet stores was $610 million. In 2014, Sears Outlet partnered with the Make-A-Wish Foundation to support children with life-threatening conditions. By August 2019, 127 Outlet Stores were in operation. In 2019, it was reported that this division might need to be divested as per acquisition by Transform Holdco. And which in August 2019, the company agreed to sell this division to the Franchise Group, the parent company of Liberty Tax. The sale of the division to the Franchise Group was finalized on October 23, 2019.

Two months later, the Franchise Group acquired American Freight in December 2019 and later rebranded its Sears Outlet stores as American Freight by April 2020.

=== Sears Home Appliance Showroom ===
The independently owned and operated speciality stores that were under license from Sears averaged 5,000-square-feet with a primarily appliance showroom design that displayed merchandise in-stores. They also had an internet kiosk where customers were able to view similar products, price match, and order products not available in the stores themselves. There were 15 locations in operation by October 2019. By April 2021, the Sears Home Appliance Showroom website was deactivated and later redirected to the main sears.com website.

=== Sears Appliance and Hardware Store ===
Sears appliance and hardware stores were hardware stores that carry the entire line of Sears hardware and appliances. averaging nearly 28,000 square feet in size, are primarily located in suburban markets. All locations were closed by June 2019.

== Awards ==
Sears Hometown and Outlet Stores received the Customer Engagement award from the online publication Retail TouchPoints for their interactive in-store campaign.
