= Kenmore (brand) =

Brand of household appliances

- Product type: Large kitchen and laundry appliances, grills, vacuum cleaners, small kitchen appliances, cookware and more
- Country: Chicago, IL, United States
- Introduced: 1913; 113 years ago
- Website: Kenmore.com

Kenmore is an American brand of household appliances, cookware, floorcare, grills, HVAC equipment and other home items owned and licensed by Transformco, an affiliate of ESL Investments. Previously, they were a subsidiary brand of Sears Holdings, but after Sears Holdings filed for Chapter 11 bankruptcy on October 15, 2018, they were acquired by Transformco, formed in 2019 after acquiring the assets of Sears Holdings Corporation.

As of 2017, Kenmore products are produced by manufacturers including Whirlpool, Samsung, LG, Electrolux, Panasonic, Cleva North America, and Winia Electronics. Today, the brand's portfolio is sold across Amazon, Lowe's, Target, and many other online retailers.

== History ==
The brand first appeared on a four-drawer drop feed sewing machine sold from 1913 to 1919. The first Kenmore washing machine was introduced in 1927. The first Kenmore vacuum cleaners were introduced in 1932.

In 1976, Sears expanded the Kenmore name to its line of refrigerators, freezers, air conditioners, and dehumidifiers, which were previously branded as Coldspot.

In 2016, the Kenmore brand was expanded into consumer electronics with the launch of Kenmore-branded high definition (Kenmore HDTV) and ultra HD (Kenmore Elite UHDTV) televisions.

In July 2017, Sears announced that it would stock Kenmore products on Amazon, and also support integration between its appliances and Amazon Alexa.

In April 2018, Sears CEO and major investor Edward Lampert, along with his hedge fund ESL, offered to buy the brand along with Sears Home Services in order to diversify Sears’ already-strained assets. The hope of spinning off a stable asset, according to Lampert, is to increase capital in Sears’ portfolio, which would filter down into the stores, thus providing much needed income for the Sears brand. Lampert revised his offer to buy Kenmore in August 2018 for $400 million and without Sears' Home Services division. On October 14, 2018, Sears' parent company Sears Holdings filed for chapter 11 bankruptcy protection leaving the future of the Kenmore brand undecided. Sears continued to sell Kenmore products and honored warranties while the company restructured.

In December 2013, Kenmore announced the launch "of an entire new line of major kitchen appliances". In the following month, Kenmore announced a long-term exclusive distribution agreement with O'Rourke Sales Company to create a major appliances distribution network of consumer and commercial retailers within the United States that includes retail, rent-to-own, E-Commerce, hospitality, builder, and the military exchanges markets.

=== Canada ===
With the demise of Sears Canada in 2018, Kenmore products were no longer sold in Canada, but existing warranty for Whirlpool-made Kenmore lines continued to be honored. A number of Canadian parts suppliers continue to provide Kenmore parts previously sold by Sears Canada. Some Kenmore products were also being individually resold online in 2021.

In January 2024, Kenmore announced that a limited selection of their products would be distributed through Costco Canada with a possibility that Kenmore may decide to expand their distribution through other Canadian retailers in the near future.

== Manufacturers ==
Whirlpool was one of the main manufacturers of Kenmore products, having manufactured some of Kenmore’s electrical appliances, such as side-by-side refrigerators, top-loading washing machines and matching dryers, and dishwashers. But in 2017, the 100 years partnership between Whirlpool and Sears Holdings ended, with Sears claiming that Whirlpool "was making demands that would make it difficult to sell the Kenmore products at competitive prices."

Whirlpool is not the only manufacturer of Kenmore products. Kenmore also outsources its products from different OEM (original equipment manufacturer) companies, such as LG, Daewoo Electronics, Panasonic, and others. The first three digits of a Sears model number (called the source code) denote who the actual manufacturer is for Sears. There are various reference charts that can be used to determine who the actual manufacturer was for Sears.

== Products ==
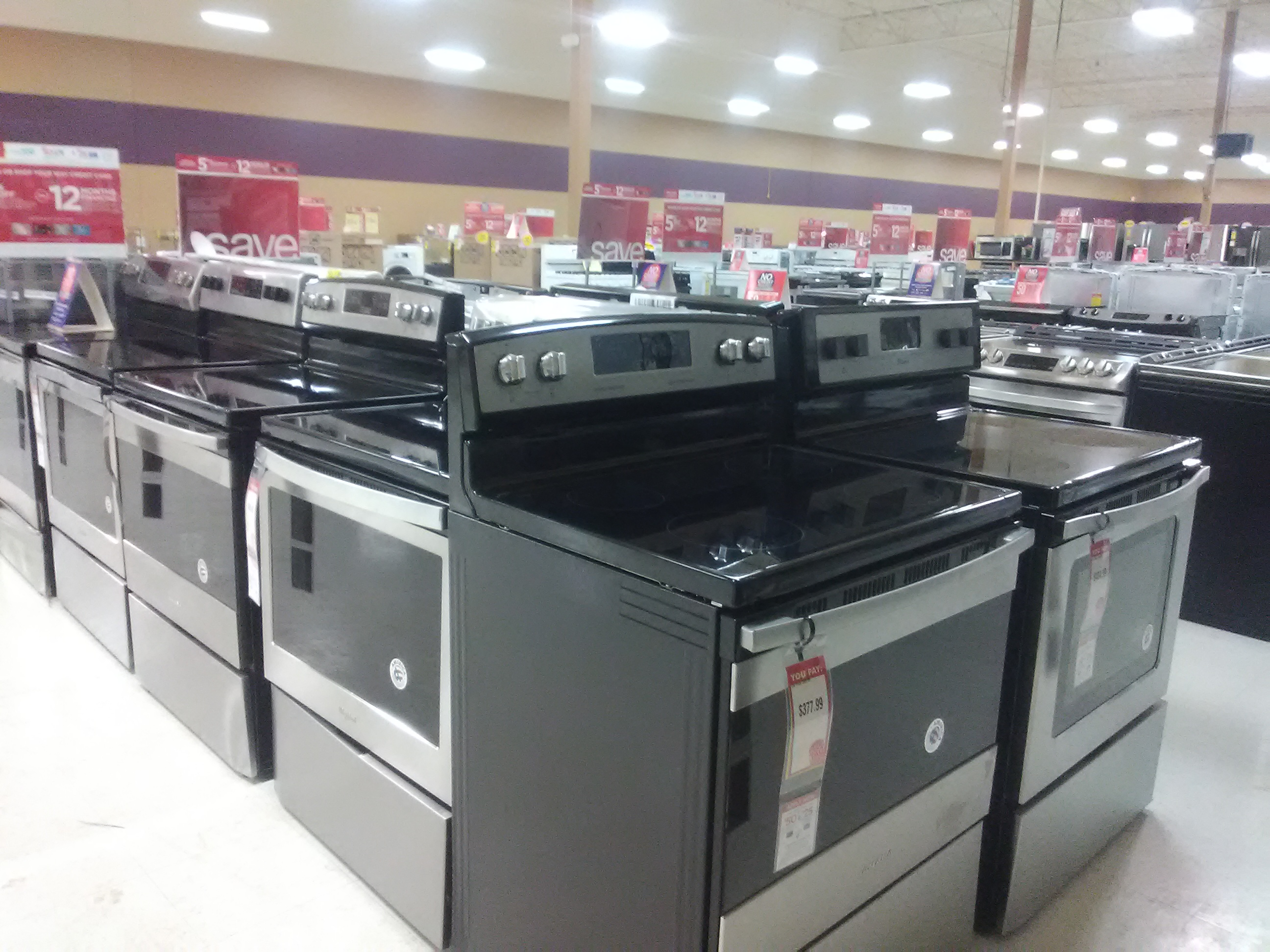
Various Kenmore kitchen stoves and other appliances at a Sears Outlet store in 2020.

Kenmore's upscale line of products is known as the Elite line. Kenmore also has a professional line of appliances called Kenmore Pro.

As of January 2019, the Kenmore brand had over 50 products listed as top performers on the non-profit website Consumer Reports.

== List of common manufacturers ==
- Whirlpool Corporation
- LG Corporation
- Electrolux
- Panasonic
- Samsung
