= Anthony Alfonso =

American businessman

Anthony Alfonso is an American businessman. He is the founder of Nutri-Force Nutrition and remained chief executive officer until the company was acquired in 2014 for $85 million by Vitamin Shoppe, Inc.

== Early life and education ==
Alfonso holds a Master's of Business Administration from Nova Southeastern University and a Bachelor of Science in Pharmaceutical Sciences from Florida A&M University.

== Career ==
In 2001, Alfonso founded Nutri-Force Nutrition, a cGMP awardee in the contract manufacturing labeling and branding of nutraceuticals, vitamins and nutritional supplements. In June 2014, The Vitamin Shoppe acquired Nutri-Force Nutrition for $85 million, and Alfonso became Senior Vice President at The Vitamin Shoppe. He is also an Operating Advisor at MBF Healthcare Partners, a private equity firm founded in 2005 in Coral Gables, Florida.

Alfonso is a preceptor for students in the College of Pharmacy at Nova Southeastern University, as part of an internship program.

== Awards ==
In 2012, as president and CEO of Nutri-Force Nutrition, Alfonso received South Florida Business Journal's Entrepreneur of the Year award. In 2014, Alfonso received Top Minority Business Award in the Executive of the Year category from the Greater Miami Chamber of Commerce.
