= Franklin Mall =

Dead mall in Philadelphia, Pennsylvania, U.S.

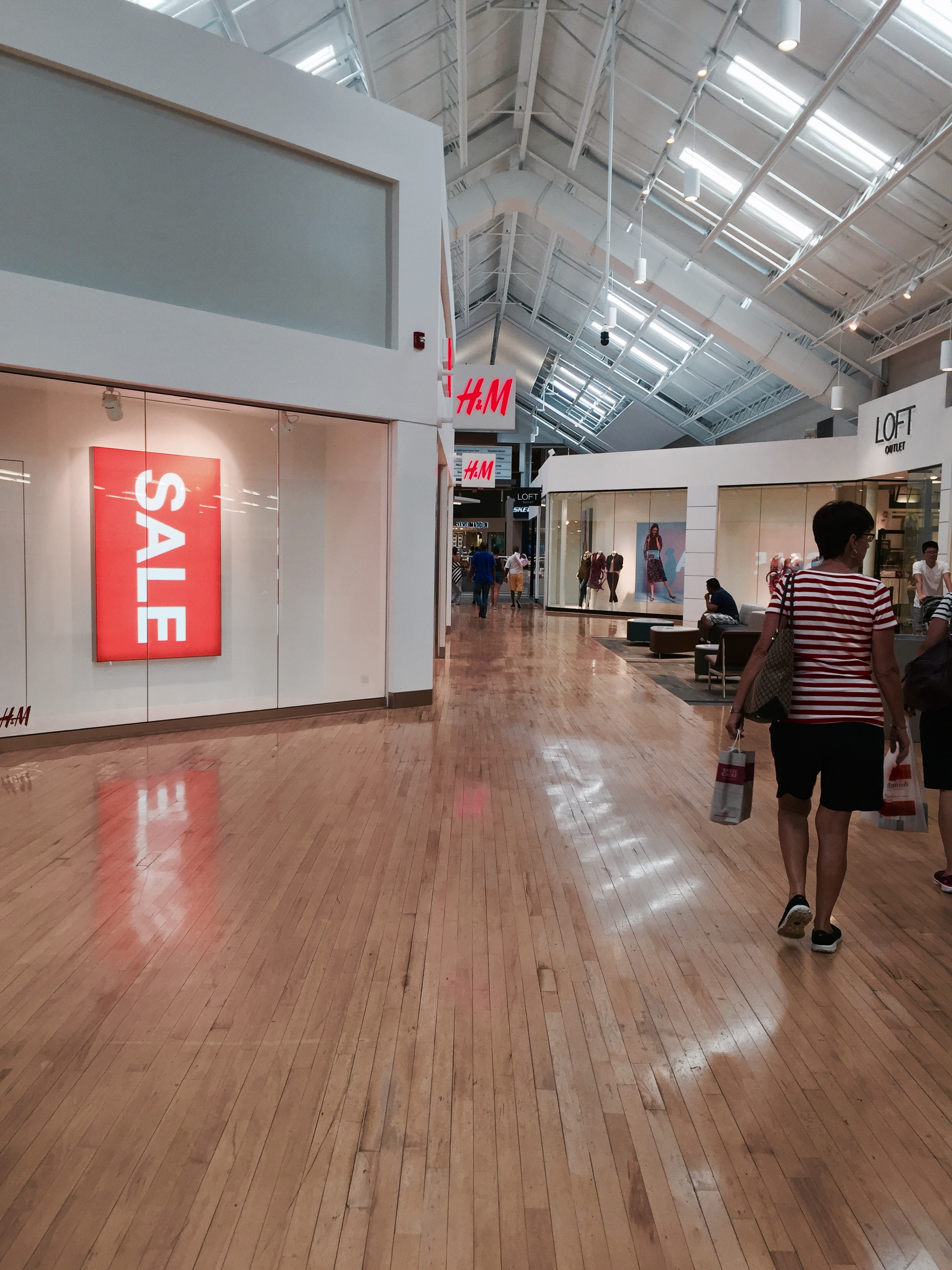
- Interior view and concourse (July 2016) with the H&M storefront on the left
- Location: Philadelphia, Pennsylvania, U.S.
- Coordinates: 40.087°N 74.9616°W
- Address: 1455 Franklin Mills Circle
- Opened: May 11, 1989; 37 years ago
- Renovated: 2014–2016
- Previous names: Franklin Mills (1989–2014); Philadelphia Mills (2014–2024)
- Developer: Western Development Corporation; KanAm U.S. (KanAm Group)
- Manager: OPEX CRE Management
- Owner: JLL Properties
- Architect: CambridgeSeven
- Num. of stores: 125 (at peak; 64 remaining)
- Num. of anchor tenants: 13 (6 open, 7 vacant)
- Floor area: 1,603,000 square feet (150,000 m^{2})
- Floors: 1 (2 in former Burlington)
- Parking: Parking lot
- Public transit: SEPTA bus: 20, 50, 67, 84, 129, 130
- Website: shopfranklinmall.com
- Building details
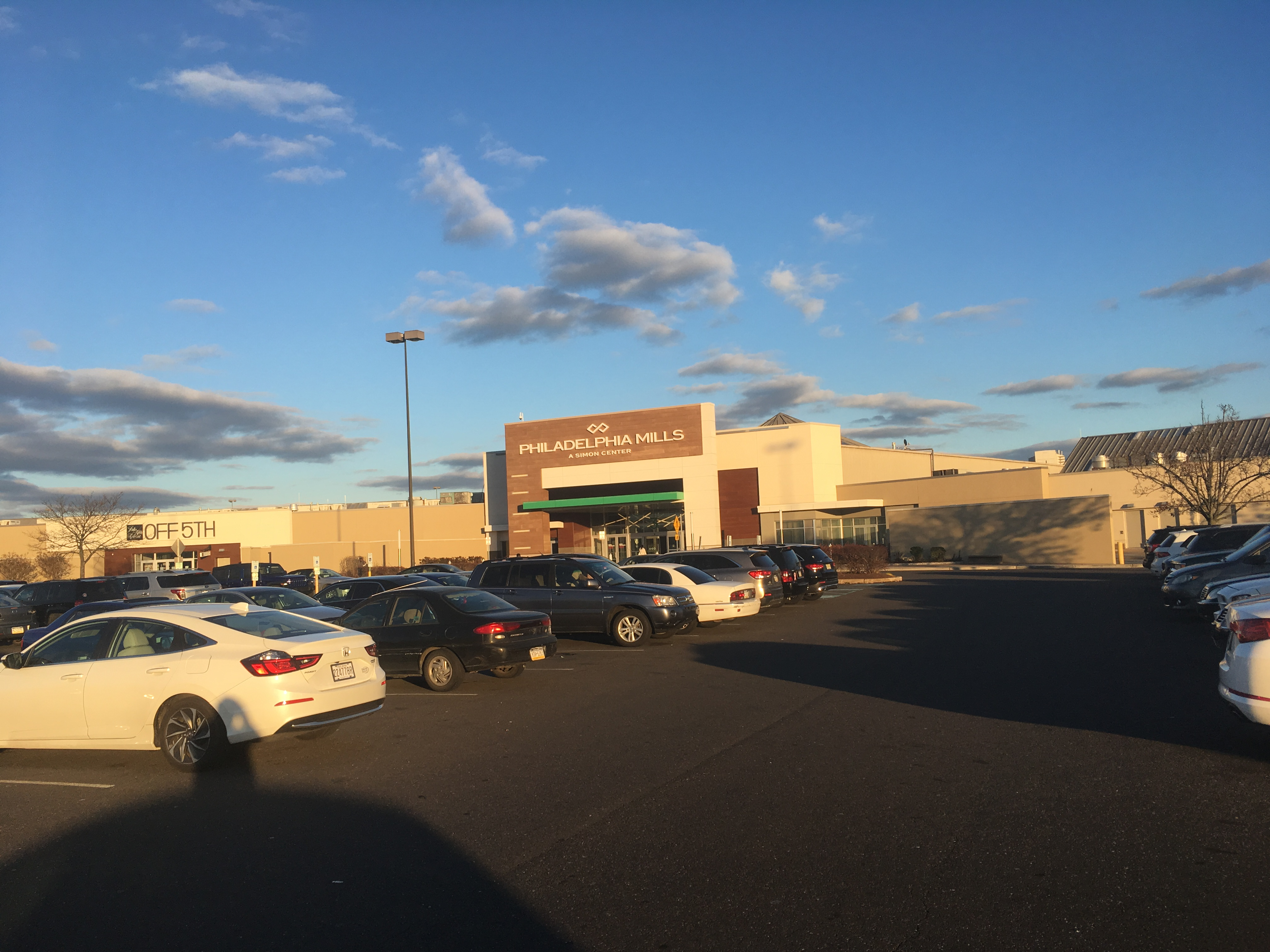
- Green entrance to Franklin Mall (then known as Philadelphia Mills) in November 2018, when the mall was operated by Simon Property Group

General information
- Status: Operational
- Named for: Benjamin Franklin (1989–2014, 2024–present)
- Construction started: 1988; 38 years ago
- Completed: 1989

Renovating team
- Architect: Bergmann Associates
- Renovating firm: Simon Property Group

Franklin Mall is a super-regional outlet mall in northeast Philadelphia, bordering Bensalem in Bucks County and 15 miles (24 km) from Center City. Named for Benjamin Franklin, the mall originally opened in 1989 as Franklin Mills, and was home to 125 stores, a food court, and seven theme restaurants.

The mall was visited by an estimated 18 million people in 2006. When Simon Property Group acquired the Mills Corporation, the mall's original owners, in April 2007, the mall rebranded as Philadelphia Mills in 2014. A 2016 renovation stripped away the original Ben Franklin decorations.

The mall went through receivership, and was renamed Franklin Mall in late 2024 after JLL Properties and OPEX CRE Management purchased it. As of October 2026, the mall is roughly 40% vacant. The property was originally planned to be redeveloped into a mixed-use complex by Lubert-Adler Partners, but the sale collapsed over the summer.

== History ==
=== Background ===
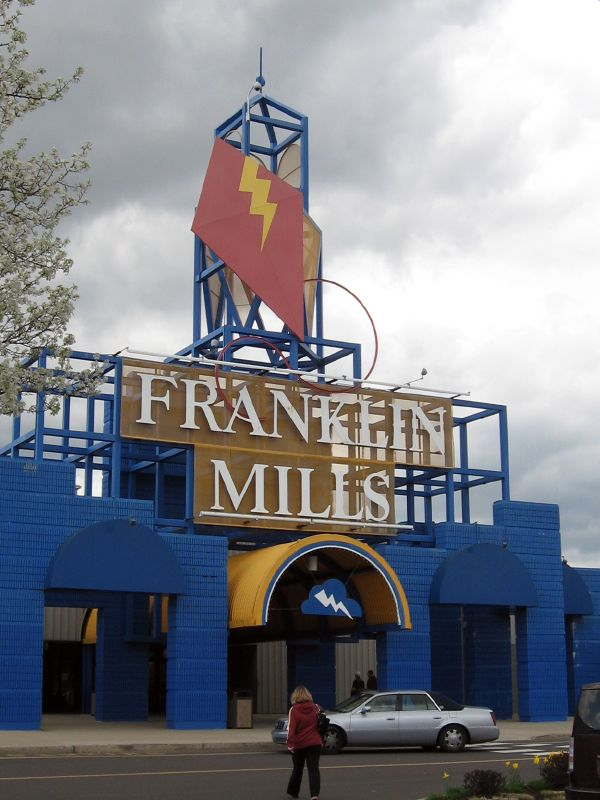
Kite entrance (April 2008)

The Franklin Mall site was formerly home to Liberty Bell Park Racetrack. It was located about a mile west of Interstate 95, at the intersection of Woodhaven Road (Pennsylvania Route 63) and Knights Road.

Liberty Bell Park Racetrack, opening in 1963, was a popular venue for horse harness and thoroughbred racing throughout the 1970s, drawing crowds of over 20,000 spectators. However, the track faced stiff competition from Keystone Racetrack (Note: Now Parx Casino and Racing.) in Bensalem Township, Pennsylvania. In 1985, Liberty Bell Park Racetrack closed permanently amid decline in the racing market, clearing the way for redevelopment.

=== Late 1980s: Development and opening ===
In the late 1980s, Western Development Corporation of Washington, D.C., later spun-off as the Mills Corporation of Arlington, Virginia in 1994, announced that they would develop a massive outlet mall on the Liberty Bell Park Racetrack site. This would be the company's second Mills mall following the successful Potomac Mills in Woodbridge, Virginia. This would also be the second Mills mall to be developed and funded by the German-based management firm KanAm Group, which formed a joint venture with Western. Franklin Mills would be designed by Cambridge, Massachusetts-based architectural firm CambridgeSeven.

Despite concerns from local retailers about competition, the project was approved due to the promise of drawing tourists and bus tours from New York, New Jersey, and Delaware. When construction began in around 1988, the Liberty Bell Park Racetrack was demolished. Franklin Mills had a massive grand opening celebration on May 11, 1989, titled The Mall to End Them All, and was, at the time, the world's largest outlet mall that was not solely a shopping destination, but also later became one of Philly's largest tourist attractions. Franklin Mills' original anchors were JCPenney Outlet Store, Sears Outlet, Ports of the World, 49th Street Galleria, Reading China and Glass, and Phar-Mor.

==== Branding and design ====
Franklin Mills was designed in the shape of a thunderbolt in commemoration of Benjamin Franklin's kite-and-key experiment. The mall's former logo included a red kite with a lightning bolt on the right side and the string ending on the letter "A" of "FRANKLIN". The mall is separated by its four Neighborhoods: Red, Blue, Yellow, and Green, and has six main entries including its neighborhood color entries, plus Aqua at the Grand Court and the Orange Entry in its Green Neighborhood near the former Steve & Barry's.

Franklin Mills was the first Landmark Mills mall to have two food courts. Cafe Court, at Red Neighborhood 1, was anchored by Gap, along with Cafe Freedom, a larger food court at Green Neighborhood 4.

=== 2000–2012: Simon Property Group ===
Franklin Mills featured two video courts; however, one of them was removed in 2000.

In February 2007, The Mills Corp.'s portfolio, including Franklin Mills, would be acquired by the Indianapolis, Indiana-based Simon Property Group and Farallon Capital Management for $1.64 billion, as Mills was being investigated by the Securities and Exchange Commission (SEC) for their financial struggles in May 2006. The acquisition was completed in April 2007, and the Mills Corporation was rebranded The Mills: A Simon Company.

On December 15, 2011, it was announced that JCPenney would be returning to Franklin Mills as a department store. The original JCPenney Outlet Store had been closed as part of a nationwide realignment by the retailer of all its outlet stores to focus on its core retail operations and online businesses. Franklin Mills was one of the two JCPenney Outlet locations selected to be converted into a traditional anchor, the other one being the Potomac Mills location.

From the mall's opening until 2012, an animatronic likeness of Benjamin Franklin's face hung from the ceiling at the Grand Court between Neighborhoods Blue and Yellow, which would announce the time hourly. Almost all main mall entries have a graphic at their entry. Throughout the mall, there were several sets of projection TVs hanging from the ceiling known as Mills TV, showing video loops of music videos and advertisements. In the early 2010s, they were replaced by double-faced Daktronics LED boards.

=== 2014–2016: Renovation and rebranding ===
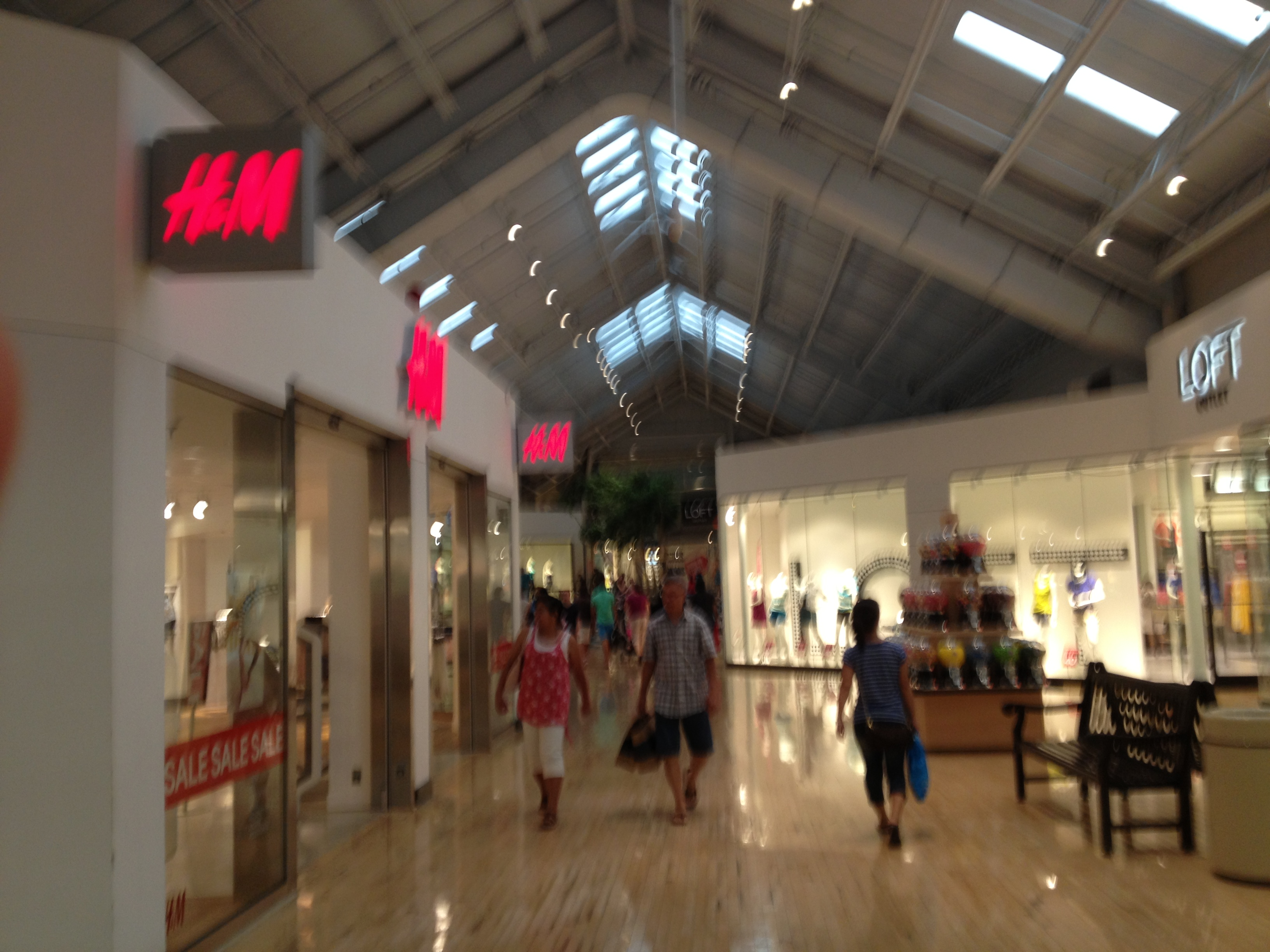
Concourse as Franklin Mills (June 2013)

Franklin Mills' last remaining video court was removed in August 2014. On September 16, 2014, Simon Property Group renamed the mall from Franklin Mills to Philadelphia Mills, alongside a massive renovation designed by New York-based Bergmann Associates. Interior work was scheduled to begin in early 2015, with a grand reopening celebration initially slated for fall 2015. Exterior work has already been completed. It was also noted that a new Walmart Supercenter would open at the site just one week after the renovation announcement.

By early 2016, the mall's food courts were renamed Dining Pavilion, and the entire mall and food court was renovated to feature contemporary aesthetics, including white and silver colors. New LED lighting and wooden floors were also installed, while the Ben Franklin decorations Franklin Mills once had were completely removed.

=== 2017–present: Decline ===
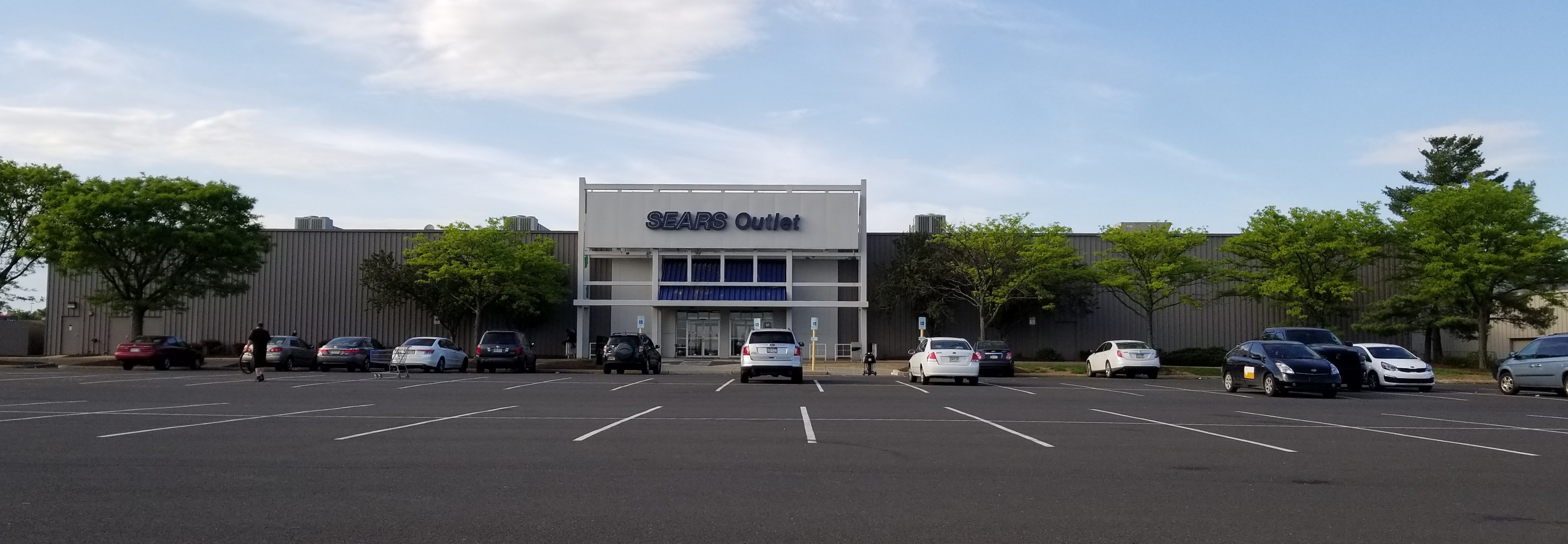
Sears Outlet (May 2018)

On March 17, 2017, JCPenney announced that its Franklin Mills store would be closing again as part of a plan to close 138 stores nationwide; the store closed permanently on July 31, 2017.

After the renovations, Philadelphia Mills' 1,600,000-square-foot (150,000 m^{2}) space primarily consisted of factory outlet stores. In September 2020, Sears Outlet rebranded as American Freight. In early 2021, the surviving major anchor tenants included Marshalls and Burlington. In 2023, Philadelphia Mills had a reported net operating income of $10.3 million, the lowest it has ever been under Simon's ownership. Additionally, the property was appraised by the City of Philadelphia, and its value was only $101 million, a major decrease from its 2007 assessment of $370 million at the time of the Mills acquisition.

Sam Ash Music, an instrument company, shuttered its Philadelphia Mills store—alongside 41 other stores—in May 2024 after filing for Chapter 11 bankruptcy. Simon Property Group was looking to cede the mall to its debtholders due to a $278.2 million loan that was due in June 2024. Simon still owed $258.5 million to its debtors, and the remaining loan amount has gone into special servicing. In October 2024, OPEX CRE Management was hired as a court-appointed receiver by the Philadelphia County Court of Common Pleas to handle Philadelphia Mills' day-to-day operations. In November 2024, American Freight filed for Chapter 11 bankruptcy and closed all of its stores, including Philadelphia Mills. JLL acquired and renamed the mall from Philadelphia Mills to Franklin Mall in December 2024 in response to the backlash the mall's "Philadelphia Mills" name got, and the fact that Simon trademarked the "Mills" name.

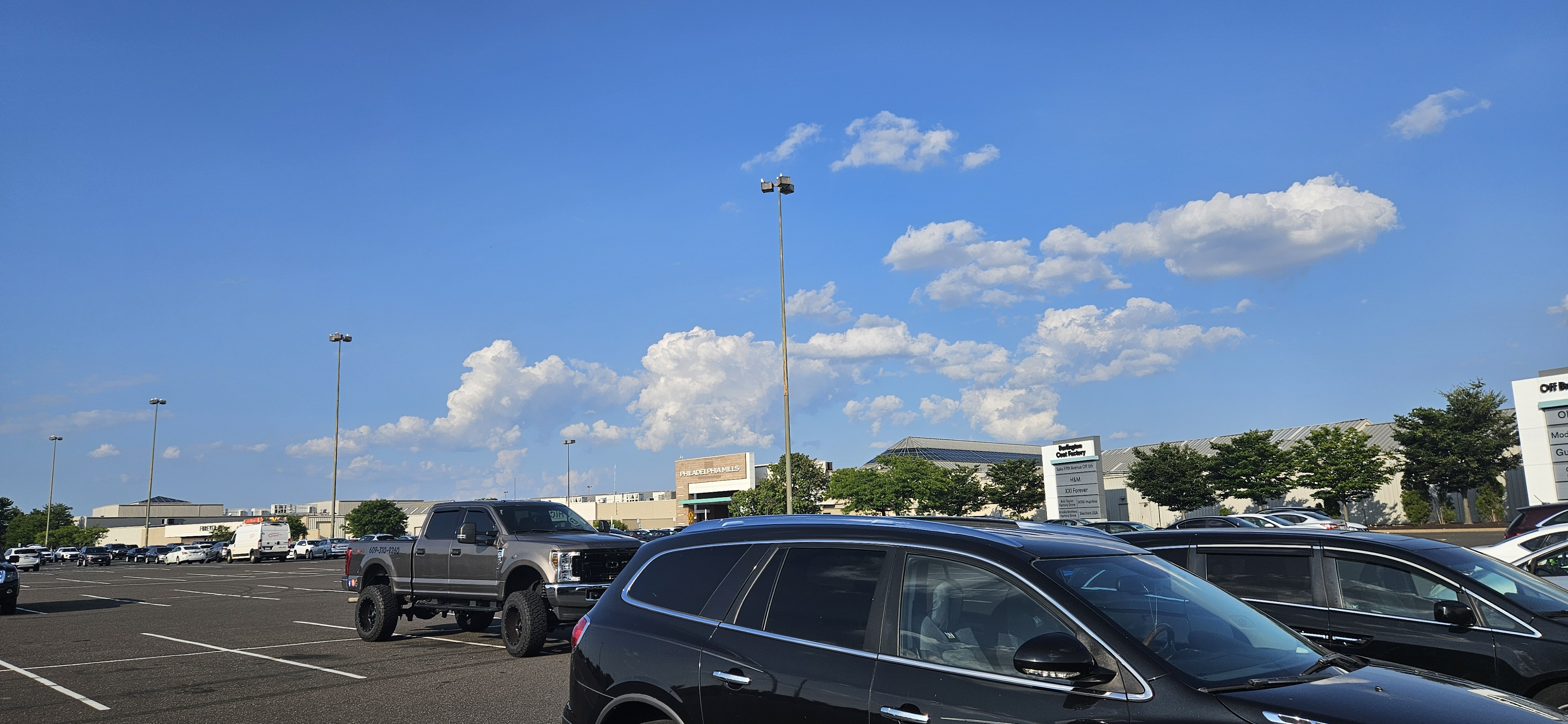
Franklin Mall entrance with Simon branding removed

In January 2025, AMC Theatres, operating as AMC Philadelphia Mills 14 (formerly AMC Franklin Mills 14), permanently closed its doors because its lease expired. The company posted an "AMC Philadelphia Mills 14 Has Permanently Closed" notice on both the theater's entrance and its website, redirecting visitors and staff members to its larger AMC Neshaminy 24 at the competing Neshaminy Mall. In February 2025, Forever 21 vacated Franklin Mall as part of a plan to close all U.S. stores after filing for Chapter 11 bankruptcy. Saks Off 5th closed two Philadelphia stores in November 2025. One of them was the Franklin Mall location.

==== Failed sale and redevelopment ====
In December 2025, JLL put the struggling Franklin Mall up for sale, prompting to potential buyers that Franklin Mall, with 68% occupancy, had a "strong candidate for redevelopment into a modern industrial facility." Burlington closed permanently on February 20, 2026. As of March 2026, Franklin Mall only features a few major tenants left, including Walmart and Dave & Buster's.

On April 9, 2026, it was announced that Franklin Mall would be sold to Dean Adler of Lubert-Adler Partners. Adler plans to replace the struggling center with a mixed-use development, featuring a massive indoor/outdoor sports complex with 250 units of workforce housing. A 150-room Homewood Suites by Hilton hotel is planned to include new restaurants. A Margaritaville-themed water park will also be constructed. The redevelopment will include partial demolition of the mall, though Adler plans to repurpose "as much space as possible." On April 16, 2026, Adler announced that the redevelopment was estimated to cost approximately $100 million.

However, it was later revealed on October 26, 2026, that the mall was no longer for sale, as OPEX CRE noted that Adler walked away from the transaction over the summer. By this point, Franklin Mall's occupancy had dropped to roughly 40%, down from 65% in late 2025, and a peak of 91% in 2016. As a result, OPEX CRE is in the process of trying to sign new tenants to fill the vacant storefronts before putting the property on sale again; they noted that 70,000-square-foot (6,500 m^{2}) of leases had been renewed.

==== 2026 fire ====
On February 21, 2026, a fire occurred in one of the stores at the mall, resulting in the entire mall being closed while the mall was being inspected to determine when it would be safe to reopen. During the fire, the building was deemed an "unsafe structure". After passing safety inspections, Franklin Mall reopened on February 27, 2026.

== Gallery ==
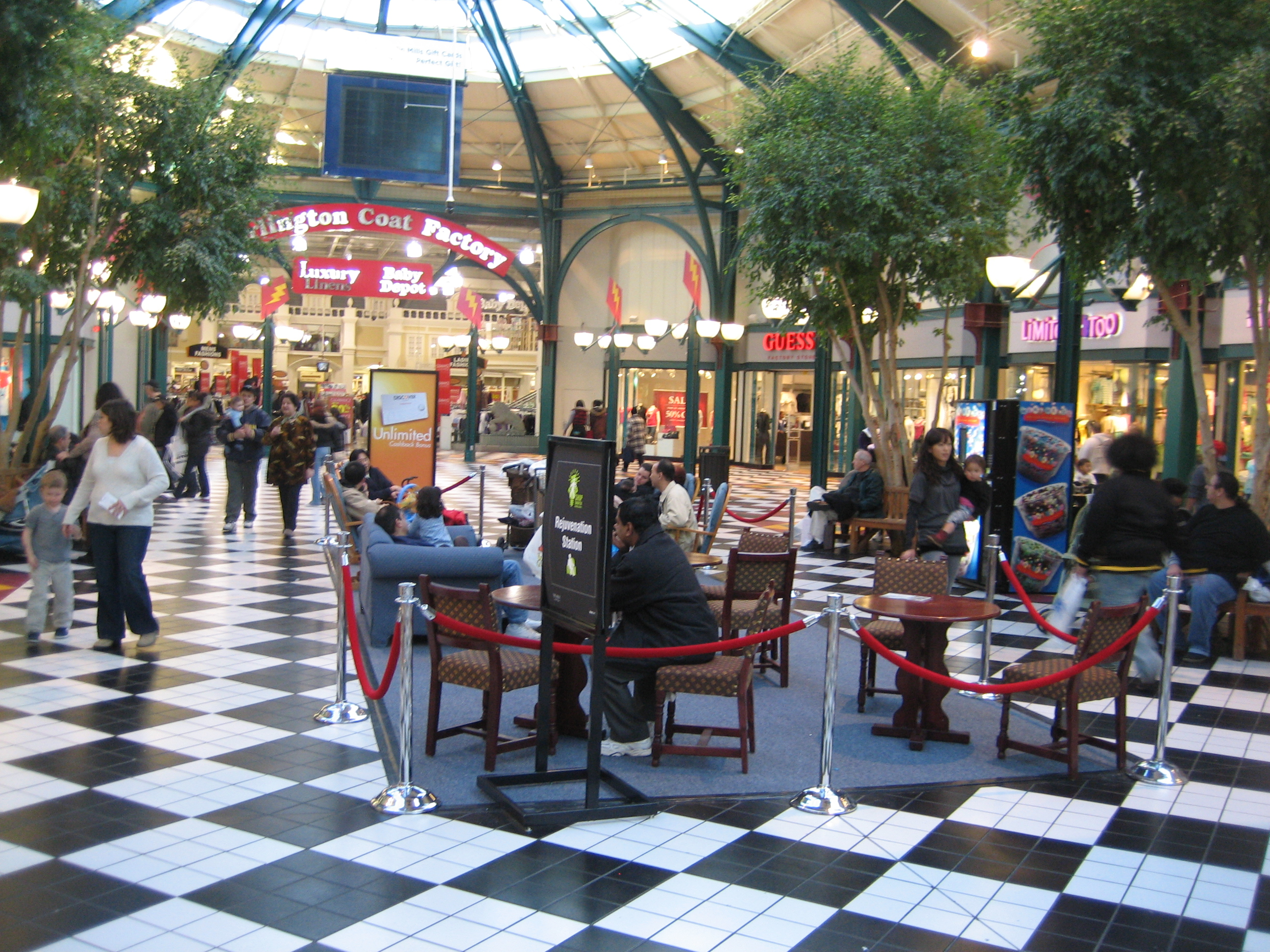
Food court in January 2009 (pre-Simon remodel)

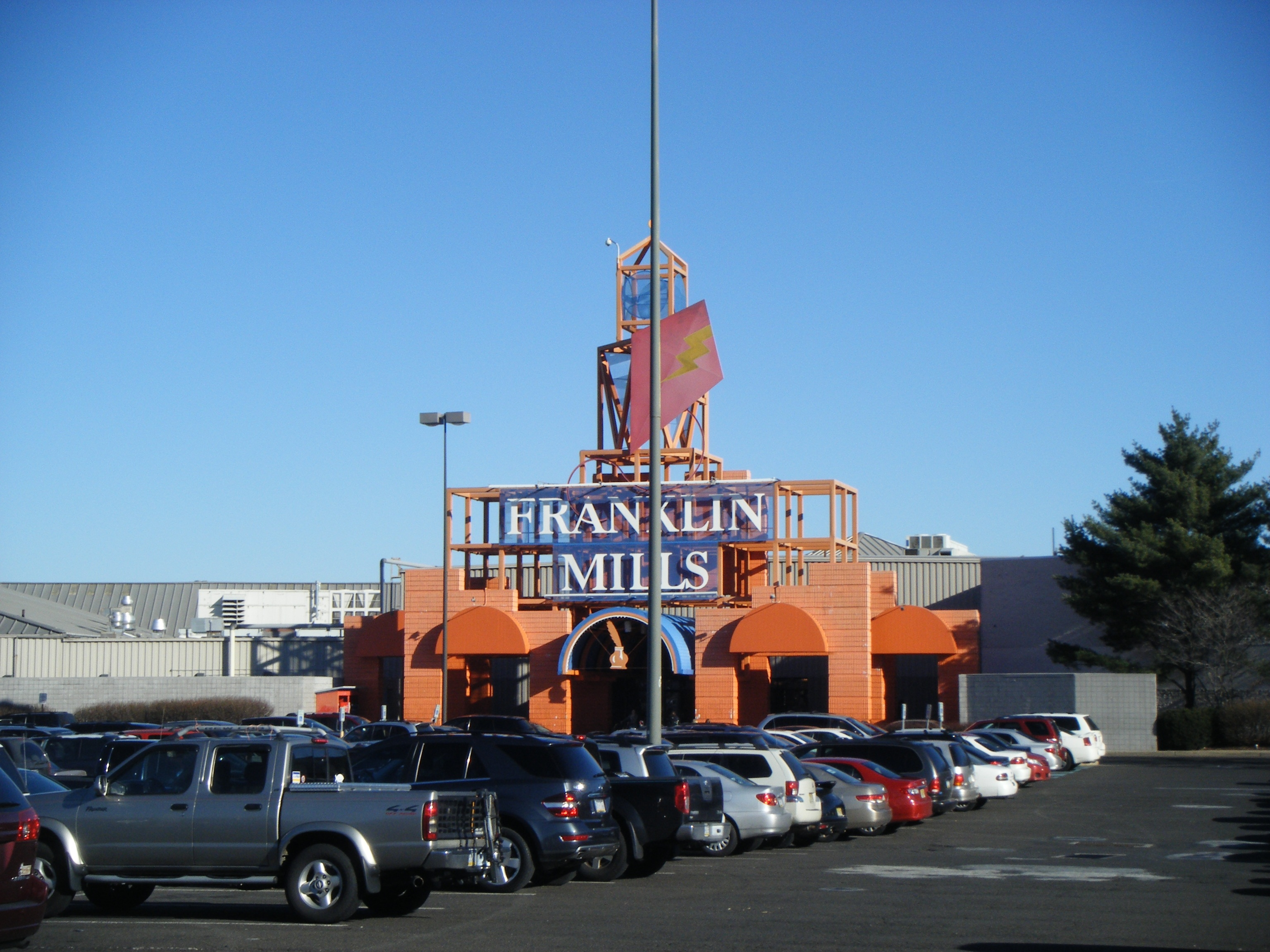
Orange entrance in January 2013

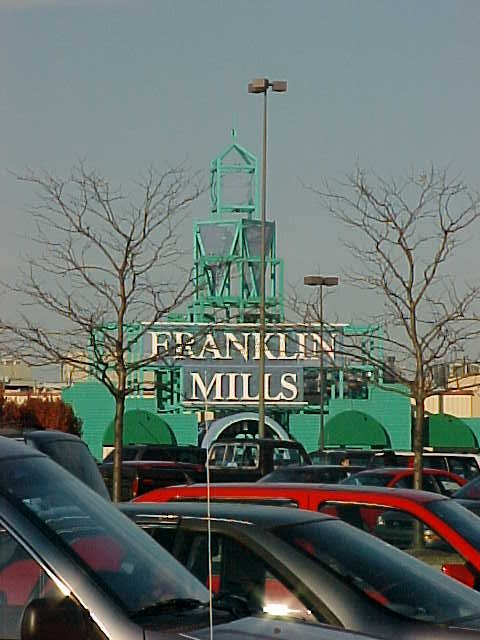
Green entrance in November 2001 before 2014–2016 remodel by Simon

== See also ==
- Pittsburgh Mills, another Landmark Mills property in dead mall status
- St. Louis Mills, which closed in September 2019 and became an industrial facility (Hazelwood Business Park)
- Forest Fair Mall, in the process of being redeveloped into an industrial building
- Plymouth Meeting Mall, also slated for redevelopment by Dean Adler
