= Franklin Mills =

Franklin Mills could refer to:

- Kent, Ohio, formerly called Franklin Mills
- Franklin Mall, formerly referred to as Franklin Mills Mall
