= Sears Outlet =

American retail company

- Formerly: Sears Surplus (1968–1994)
- Company type: Subsidiary
- Industry: Retail
- Founded: 1968; 58 years ago in Kansas City, Missouri
- Defunct: 2020; 6 years ago
- Fate: Acquisition by Franchise Group
- Successor: American Freight
- Parent: Sears (1968–2005); Sears Holdings (2005–2012); Sears Hometown & Outlet Stores (2012–2019); Franchise Group (2019–2020)

Sears Outlet was an American outlet store chain for overstock merchandise belonging to the Sears department store chain. It sold new, reconditioned, overstock, scratch & dented, and discontinued products online and through brick and mortar stores in the United States and Puerto Rico. Each store, on average, is larger than 18,000 square feet in size. Sears Outlet’s product range included refrigerators, washers & dryers, ovens, air conditioners, home appliances, lawn and garden equipment, apparel, sporting goods, tools, household goods, and consumer electronics.

Sears Outlet was acquired from Sears Hometown and Outlet Stores by Franchise Group in 2019, and converted to American Freight in 2020.

== History ==
In 1968, Sears opened a Sears Surplus store in Kansas City. This was the first of its kind operated by the Sears brand.

In 1987, the Surplus stores were renamed to Sears Outlet.

In 2008, Apparel was introduced to stores and served as a liquidation outlet for Lands' End.

In 2012, parent Sears Holdings spun off Sears Outlet along with Sears (Authorized) Hometown Stores, Sears Home Appliance and Showroom Stores, and Sears Appliance and Hardware Stores to form Sears Hometown and Outlet Stores, Inc (SHOS). The new company became its own independent, publicly traded company listed on NASDAQ. At the time of the separation, there were 122 Sears Outlet Stores in operation.

The company partnered with the National Volunteer Fire Council in November 2013 to raise money for local fire departments. The objective of the campaign was to provide firehouses with funds to improve resources for training, equipment, and financial support.

When former parent Sears Holdings filed for Chapter 11 bankruptcy protection on October 15, 2018, Sears Hometown and Outlet Stores was not affected due to having been spun off from Sears since 2012.

In April 2019, it was announced that TransformCo would acquire the company. However it was reported a few days later that Sears Hometown and Outlet Stores acquisition offer was rejected, and as a result Sears Hometown and Outlet Stores could have faced liquidation, similarly to Sears Holdings but which was acquired by ESL Investments a few months earlier.

In June 2019, it was announced that TransformCo would acquire the remaining shares in the company. Under the terms of the new merger agreement, Sears Hometown was given a specified period of time to market and sell its Sears Outlet and Buddy's Home Furnishing Stores businesses (together, the "Outlet Segment") to a third party for not less than $97.5 million. If the Outlet Segment is sold in accordance with the terms, it would not be acquired by Transform in the acquisition of Sears Hometown. At the time of the announcement, Sears Hometown and Outlet Stores had 491 Hometown stores and 126 Outlet stores in 49 states, Puerto Rico and Bermuda.

In August 2019, Franchise Group, Inc., the parent of Liberty Tax, announced plans to acquire the Sears Outlet division from Sears Hometown and Outlet Stores, and on October 23, 2019, Sears Hometown and Outlet Stores completed its sale of Sears Outlet division to Franchise Group. TransformCo completed the acquisition of the remainder of Sears Hometown at the end of the same business day.

== Awards ==
- Customer Engagement award from the online publication Retail TouchPoints in 2014 for integration of in-store and online shopping experiences at Sears Outlet stores.
