= Pet Supplies Plus =

U.S. pet supply retailing corporation

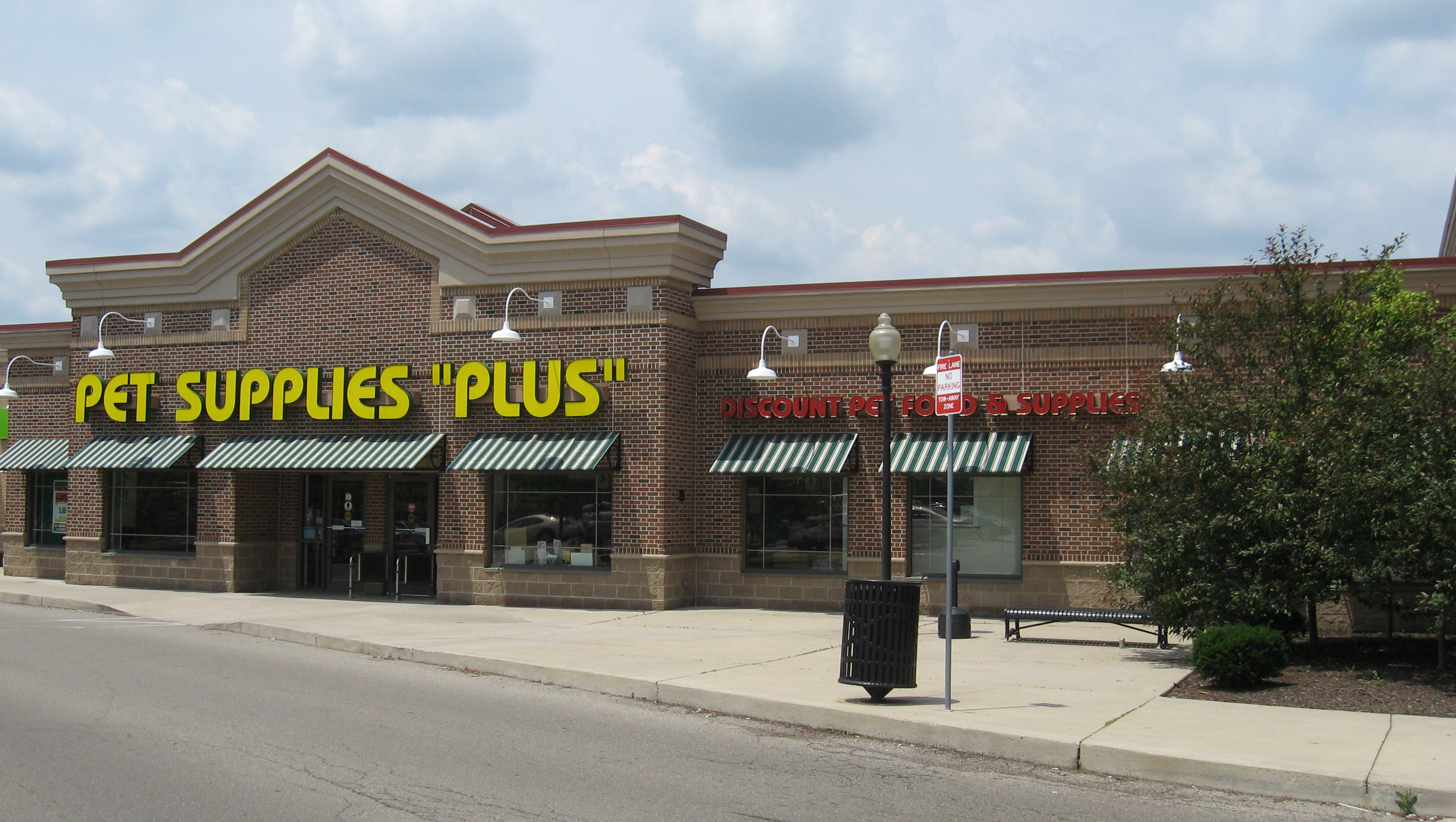
- A Pet Supplies Plus location in Centerville, Ohio
- Formerly: Pet Supplies "Plus"
- Company type: Subsidiary
- Industry: Retail
- Founded: June 1988; 38 years ago, in Redford, Michigan, United States (as Pet Supplies "Plus")
- Founder: Jack Berry; Harry Shallop
- Headquarters: Livonia, Michigan, U.S.
- Number of locations: 560 (2021)
- Area served: United States
- Key people: Chris Rowland (CEO)
- Products: Pet food and supplies
- Brands: Various
- Services: Dog grooming, self serve dog wash, pet adoptions
- Revenue: ▲$2 billion (2021)
- Number of employees: 3,000 (2021)
- Parent: Franchise Group (2021-2025); Fusion Parent LLC (2025-present)
- Website: www.petsuppliesplus.com

Pet Supplies Plus (also styled Pet Supplies "Plus") is a privately held pet supply retailing corporation with a major presence in the United States. Founded in 1988 in Redford, Michigan, U.S., it has in-house pet foods such as Redford Naturals.

As of 2005, it was the third largest specialty pet food retailer in the US. The firm began adding franchise locations in the Midwest, expanding into the northeastern and southern states during the late 1990s. As of May 2023, Pet Supplies Plus store locations consisted of over 720 stores in 36 states.

== History ==
Pet Supplies Plus was founded in 1988 by Harry Shallop and Jack Berry, in Redford, Michigan. In 2018, the company was acquired by Sentinel Capital Partners.

In January 2021, the Franchise Group, Inc. (FGI) announced it was acquiring Pet Supplies Plus, and the deal was closed on March 10.

On November 2, 2024, FGI announced that they were preparing to file for Chapter 11 bankruptcy after months of losses and turmoil caused by its owner, B. Riley Financial. HPS Investment Partners, a private equity firm, amongst other lenders, will take over the company once the restructuring is completed.

On November 3, Franchise Group and all of its affiliated subsidiaries filed for Chapter 11 bankruptcy protection in Delaware. The company plans to keep Pet Supplies Plus open during the procedure.
