= FBR Capital Markets =

Former US investment banking company

FBR & Co.
- Company type: Subsidiary
- Traded as: Nasdaq: FBRC
- Industry: Financial Institution
- Founded: 1989; 37 years ago
- Headquarters: Arlington, Virginia, United States
- Products: Investment banking, Brokerage
- Revenue: ▲US $120.4 Million(2015)
- Net income: ▼US $7.5 Million (2015)
- Number of employees: 303 (2015)
- Parent: B. Riley Financial
- Website: www.brileyfbr.com

FBR & Co. (formerly known as Friedman, Billings, Ramsey Group) was a capital markets firm headquartered in Arlington, Virginia. Founded in 1989 by Emanuel J. Friedman, Eric F. Billings, and W. Russell Ramsey, the company provided investment banking, merger and acquisition advisory, institutional brokerage, and research services through its subsidiaries FBR Capital Markets & Co. and MLV & Co. FBR focused capital and financial expertise on the following industry sectors: consumer; energy & natural resources; financial institutions; healthcare; insurance; industrials; real estate; and technology, media & telecom. FBR was based in the Washington, D.C. metropolitan area with offices throughout the United States. In 2017 the company was sold to B. Riley Financial for $160.1 million.

== Alums ==
In April 2017, Patrick Steel of FBR took over as CEO of Politico from the owner Robert Allbritton. Steel, age 49 at the time of the appointment, had served in President Bill Clinton's administration and contributed money to former Secretary of State Hillary Clinton and other Democrats. He had been at FBR since 2001 working in IPOs and private placements.
