= The Vitamin Shoppe =

American retail company

Vitamin Shoppe Industries Inc.
- Type: Subsidiary
- Industry: Retail
- Founded: 1977; 49 years ago (as Vitamin Shoppe Industries, Inc.)
- Headquarters: Secaucus, New Jersey, U.S.
- Number of locations: 785 (December 2017)
- Key people: Lee A. Wright (CEO); Muriel Gonzalez (president)
- Products: Dietary supplements; Bodybuilding supplements; Protein supplements; Multivitamins; Nutritional supplements
- Parent: Kingswood Capital Management; Performance Investment Partners
- Website: vitaminshoppe.com

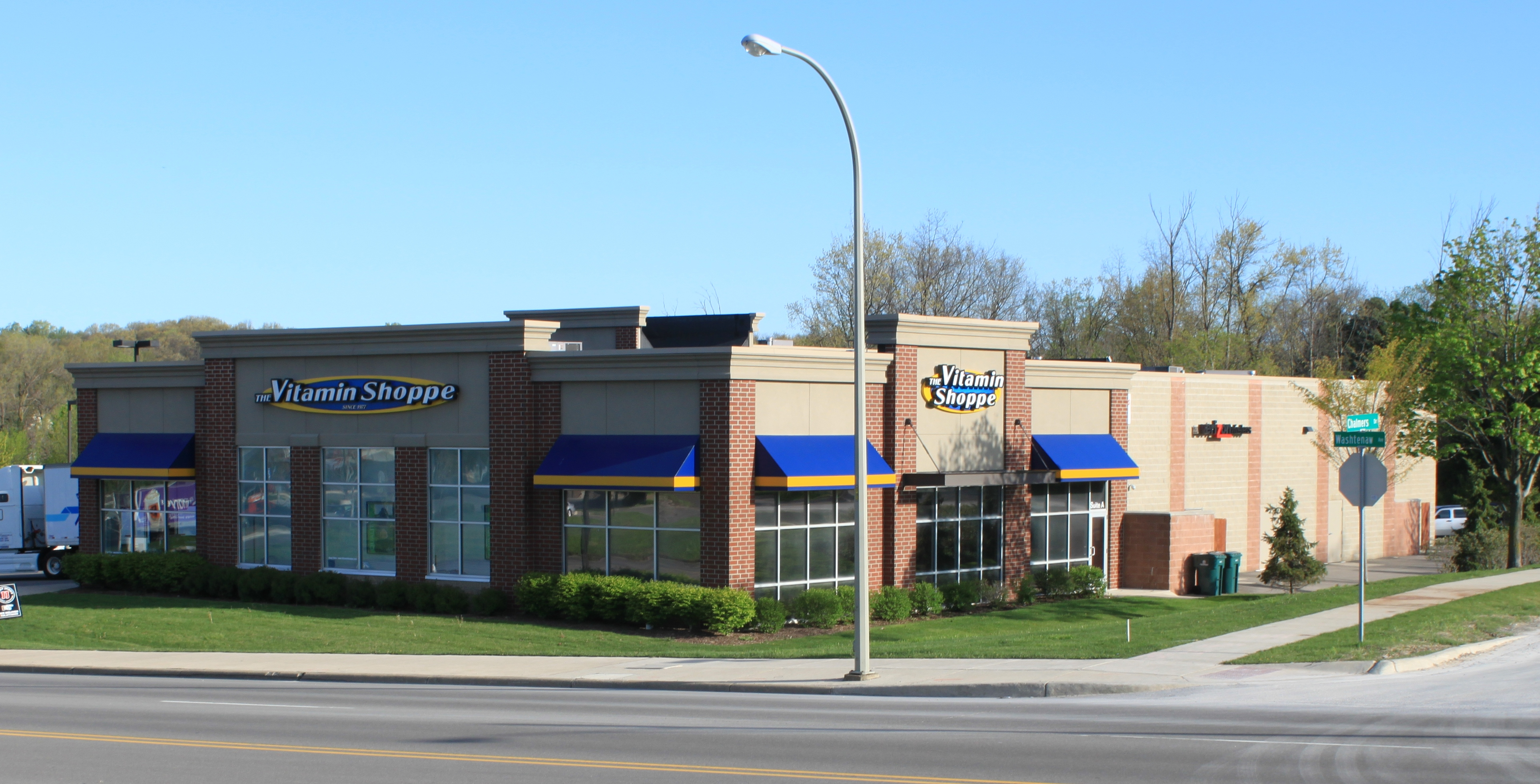
Vitamin Shoppe store, Ann Arbor, Michigan

The Vitamin Shoppe (formerly Vitamin Shoppe Industries, Inc., stylized as the VitaminShoppe) is an American, New Jersey–based retailer of nutritional supplements. It also operated three stores in Canada under the name VitaPath from January 2013 until March 2016.

The firm provides approximately 7,000 different SKUs of supplements through its retail stores and over 17,000 different SKUs of supplements through its retail websites. It was acquired by Franchise Group on December 16, 2019.

In May 2025, Kingswood Capital Management and Performance Investment Partners announced that they had completed the purchase of the company.

== History ==
Jeffrey Horowitz founded The Vitamin Shoppe in 1977. In 2002, Vitamin Shoppe Industries was sold to an affiliate of Bear Stearns Merchant Banking, a private equity unit of Bear Stearns, for approximately $310 million.

The Vitamin Shoppe held an initial public offering on October 26, 2009. It made $751.5 million in net sales in fiscal 2010 and had a market capitalization of over $1 billion. Since attaining its peak in February 2013, the stock has lost more than 90% of its value as of August 2017.

In August 2020, one year after Franchise Group, Inc. (FGI) announced the purchase of the company, The Vitamin Shoppe (TVS) reported it has hired Laura Coffey as executive vice president and chief financial officer.

On November 2, 2024, FGI announced that they were preparing to file for Chapter 11 bankruptcy after months of losses and turmoil caused by its owner, B. Riley Financial. HPS Investment Partners, a private equity firm, amongst other lenders, will take over the company once the restructuring is completed.

The next day, Franchise Group and all of its subsidiaries filed for Chapter 11 bankruptcy protection in Delaware, intending to keep The Vitamin Shoppe open during the procedure.

In April 2025, FGI announced the sale of The Vitamin Shoppe to Kingswood Capital Management and Performance Investment Partners for $193.5 million; the deal was finalized on May 15.

== Products ==
The Vitamin Shoppe logo from 2001 to 2013

The Vitamin Shoppe's retail stores and online sites carry a line of nutritional supplements with supplementary lines, such as FitFactor, NatureFuel, ProBio Care, plnt and the Bodytech brand of sports supplements. In addition to its own brands, the company carries third-party lines, including professional and specialized lines.

A 2015 study, led by Dr. Pieter A. Cohen of Harvard, found that three supplements—JetFuel Superburn, JetFuel T-300 and MX-LS7—sold at Vitamin Shoppe contained BMPEA. In response, Vitamin Shoppe removed these products from shelves because the safety of these supplements was in question and may not comply with F.D.A. regulations.

== Reception ==
On January 19, 2007, independent laboratory ConsumerLab.com found 32.8 micrograms of lead per daily serving in Vitamin Shoppe's "Especially for Women" multivitamin. 15.3 micrograms is more than ten times the amount of lead permitted without a warning label in California, the only state to regulate lead in supplements. The amount of lead found was found to cause cancer and death to 29 people nationwide. In the wake of extensive adverse media coverage, Vitamin Shoppe withdrew the product, but in a statement made by CEO Tom Tolworthy denied it had any proof the vitamins were contaminated and asserted that, despite the high lead levels found in the Consumer Labs tests, its vitamins were manufactured in accordance with "good manufacturing practices."

On June 15, 2011, Vitamin Shoppe's Ultimate Woman Gold multivitamin was tested by ConsumerLab.com in their Multivitamin and Multimineral Supplements Review of 38 of the leading multivitamin/multimineral products sold in the U.S. and Canada. This multivitamin passed ConsumerLab's test, which included testing of selected index elements, their ability to disintegrate in solution per United States Pharmacopeia guidelines, lead contamination threshold set in California Proposition 65, and meeting U.S. Food and Drug Administration (FDA) labeling requirements.
