= Sentinel Capital Partners =

American private-equity firm

- Type: Private
- Industry: Private Equity
- Founded: 1995; 31 years ago
- Headquarters: One Vanderbilt, New York, New York, United States
- Key people: David S. Lobel (Managing Partner); Eric Bommer (Managing Partner); John F. McCormack (Senior Partner)
- Products: Private equity, Management Buyouts, Corporate Divestitures, Leveraged Buyouts, Growth Capital, Junior Capital
- Total assets: $11.2 billion (capital raised since inception)
- Number of employees: 68
- Website: sentinelpartners.com

Sentinel Capital Partners, L.L.C. is an American private-equity firm focusing on mid-market companies in the United States and Canada. The company is headquartered at One Vanderbilt Avenue in New York City and was founded in 1995 by David Lobel and John McCormack, who previously worked together at Smith Barney's private equity affiliate, First Century Partners. Since its founding, Sentinel has raised more than $11.2 billion of capital.

== Operations ==
Sentinel makes majority-ownership investments through its equity funds and takes minority stakes through its capital solutions funds. The firm invests in management buyouts, corporate divestitures, acquisitions of family businesses, going-private transactions, and special situations.

Sentinel targets companies with enterprise values between $25 million and $250 million, and EBITDA between $5 million and $65 million. The firm has focused its investments on companies operating in the aerospace and defense, business services, consumer, food and restaurant, healthcare services, and industrial sectors.

== Investment funds ==
Sentinel invests through a series of private limited partnerships and its investors include a variety of pension funds, endowments, and other institutional investors. Since Sentinel's establishment in 1995, it has raised seven private equity funds and two junior capital funds.

Investors in Sentinel Funds include college and university endowments, foundations, state and government retirement systems, corporate pension plans, insurance companies, sovereign wealth funds, investment advisors, and family offices located in the United States, Europe, China, Japan, Australia, and the Middle East.

| Fund | Vintage Year | Committed Capital ($m) |
|---|---|---|
| Sentinel Capital Partners VII | 2022 | $4,350 |
| Sentinel Junior Capital II | 2022 | $835 |
| Sentinel Capital Partners VI | 2018 | $2,150 |
| Sentinel Junior Capital I | 2018 | $460 |
| Sentinel Capital Partners V | 2013 | $1,300 |
| Sentinel Capital Partners IV | 2008 | $765 |
| Sentinel Capital Partners III | 2005 | $319 |
| Sentinel Capital Partners II | 1998 | $126 |
| Sentinel Capital Partners I | 1996 | $50 |

== Leadership ==
In March 2025, Sentinel announced a leadership succession plan under which Eric Bommer, who joined Sentinel as its first professional hire in 1997, was elevated to serve alongside David S. Lobel as co-managing partner, positioning him as Lobel's eventual successor. John F. McCormack continues as senior partner.

== Controversy ==
=== Buffet Holdings Settlement ===
In 2010, the creditors of Buffets Holding sued Sentinel and its investment partner Caxton-Iseman Capital for "bilk[ing] Buffets of hundreds of millions of dollars" that led to its insolvency. Sentinel and CI Capital settled the lawsuit for more than $23 million.

=== TGI Fridays ===
Sentinel and Triartisan Capital Partners acquired TGI Fridays in 2014 from Carlson a month after the company facing a nationwide collective action wage theft lawsuit. The company tried to prevent certification of an FLSA collective by settling with individual workers that alleged unpaid wages up to $91 million. Eventually TGI Fridays settled in 2017 for over $19 million to over 28,000 workers, the largest wage and hour payout at the time. In 2018, TGI Fridays was also found to have failed to pay £59,348 to its U.K. staff.

In 2019, TGI Friday was sued in a proposed class-action lawsuit for selling potato skin chips that don't contain potato skins.

In April 2020, Sentinel's deal to take TGI Friday's public was called off due to "extraordinary market conditions" due to the coronavirus outbreak.

== Past Investments ==
The firm has previously invested in franchise holders of some of the world's largest fast food chains such as Checkers and Rally's, Church's Chicken, Pizza Hut and Taco Bell.

Other past holdings include:

| Company | Sector | Acquired | Sold/Exited | Notes |
|---|---|---|---|---|
| Captain D's | Food/Restaurant | 2017 | 2022 | Quick-service seafood chain |
| Fazoli's Group | Food/Restaurant | 2015 | 2021 | Sold to FAT Brands for $130 million |
| Pet Supplies Plus | Consumer | 2018 | 2020 | Sold to Franchise Group for $700 million |
| MB2 Dental | Healthcare | 2019 | 2021 | Sold to Charlesbank Capital Partners |
| Colson Group | Industrials | 2012 | 2021 | Sold to Blue Wolf Capital |
| SONNY's | Industrials | 2016 | 2020 | Car wash systems; sold to Genstar |
| New Era Technology | Business Services | 2019 | 2025 | IT solutions provider |
| Corporate Visions | Business Services | 2016 | 2021 | Sales and marketing enablement |
| Apex Companies | Business Services | 2018 | 2023 | Environmental services; sold to Morgan Stanley Capital Partners |
| ECM Industries | Industrials | 2019 | 2023 | Sold to nVent Electric for $1.1 billion |
| Nekoosa | Industrials | 2017 | 2022 | Specialty paper and film products |
| New You Bariatric Group | Healthcare | 2019 | 2025 | Bariatric surgery practice management |
| GSM Outdoors | Consumer | 2018 | 2020 | Hunting and outdoor accessories |
| Altima Dental | Healthcare | 2016 | 2022 | Merged with 123Dentist |
| Critical Solutions International | Aerospace/Defense | 2011 | 2020 | Merged with AirBoss of America to create AirBoss Defense Group |
| Driven Performance Brands | Consumer | 2015 | 2018 | Merged into Holley Performance Products |
| Hollander Sleep Products | Consumer | 2010 | 2014 | Bedding products |
| Playcore | Consumer | 2014 | 2018 | Playground equipment |
| Quick Weight Loss Centers | Healthcare | 2016 | 2020 | Weight management services |
| Marketplace Events | Business Services | 2016 | 2019 | Consumer show production |
| Revenew | Business Services | 2016 | 2019 | Marketing services platform |
| RotoMetrics | Industrials | 2015 | 2020 | Rotary cutting tools |
| WellSpring Pharmaceutical | Healthcare | 2011 | 2015 | Specialty pharmaceutical company |

== Current Investments ==
=== Aerospace / Defense ===
- Airboss Defense Group
- Spectrum Safety Solutions
- Total Military Management

=== Business Services ===
- Ubeo Business Services
- New Era Technology (minority stake retained after 2025 exit)

=== Consumer ===
- cabi
- DecoPac
- Holley Performance Products
- L2 Brands

=== Healthcare ===
- Midwest Eye Consultants
- 123Dentist

=== Industrials ===
- NSI Industries
