= Checkers and Rally's =

American fast food company

Checkers & Rally's

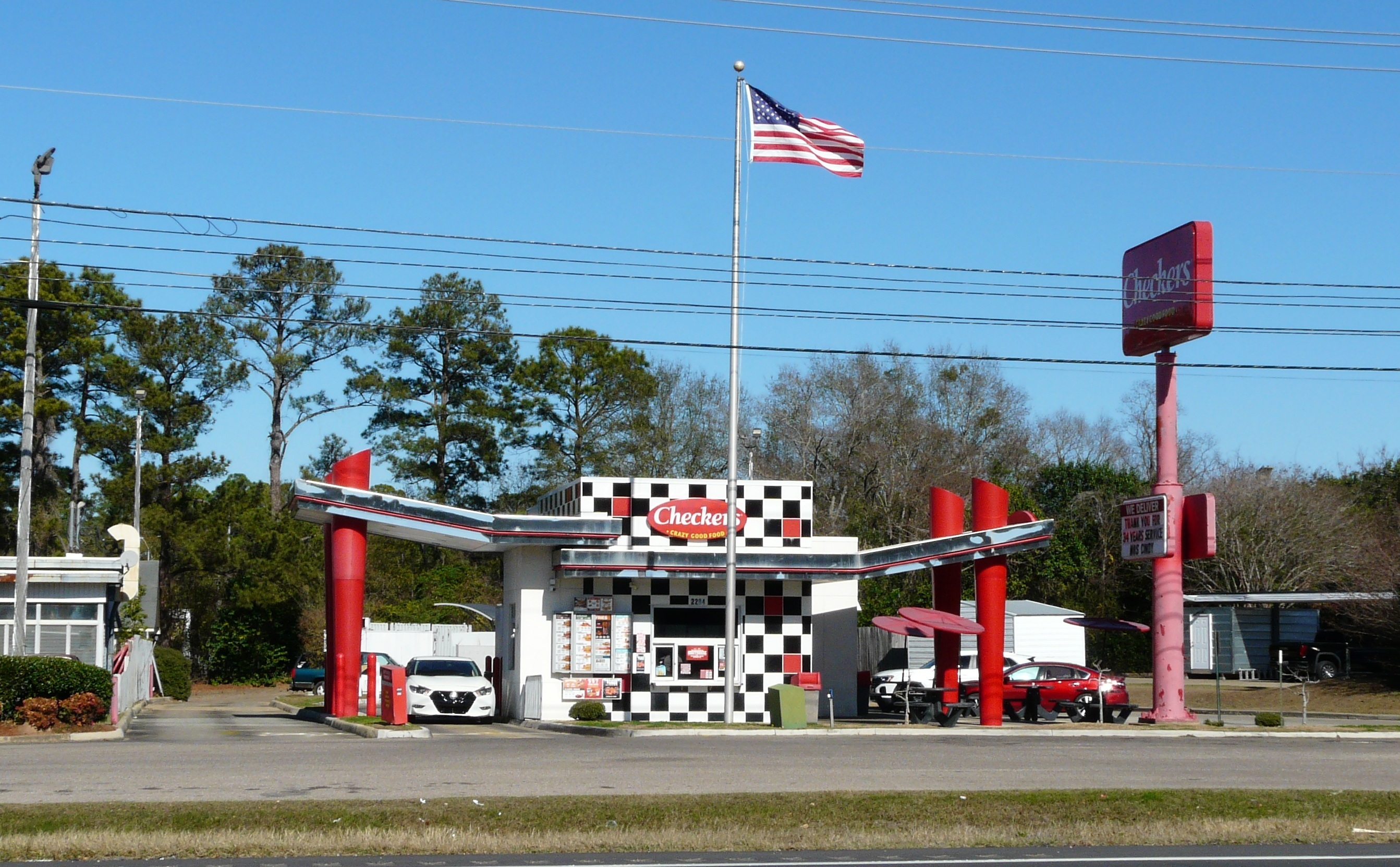
- A checkers Drive-In, Dothan, Alabama
- Trade name: Checkers; Rally's
- Type: Private
- Industry: Fast food Franchising
- Founded: 1986; 40 years ago (as Checker's); Mobile, Alabama, U.S. 1985; 41 years ago (as Rally's); Nashville, Tennessee, U.S. 1999; 27 years ago (merger of Checkers and Rally's)
- Founders: Jim Mattei (Checkers); Jim Patterson (Rally's)
- Headquarters: Tampa, Florida, U.S.
- Number of locations: 745 (2024): Checkers (472); Rally's (273)
- Area served: United States
- Products: Burgers, hot dogs, chicken, fish, hot wings, french fries, shakes, soft drinks
- Revenue: US$ 521 million ▲
- Owner: Checkers Drive-In Restaurants, Inc.
- Website: checkersandrallys.com

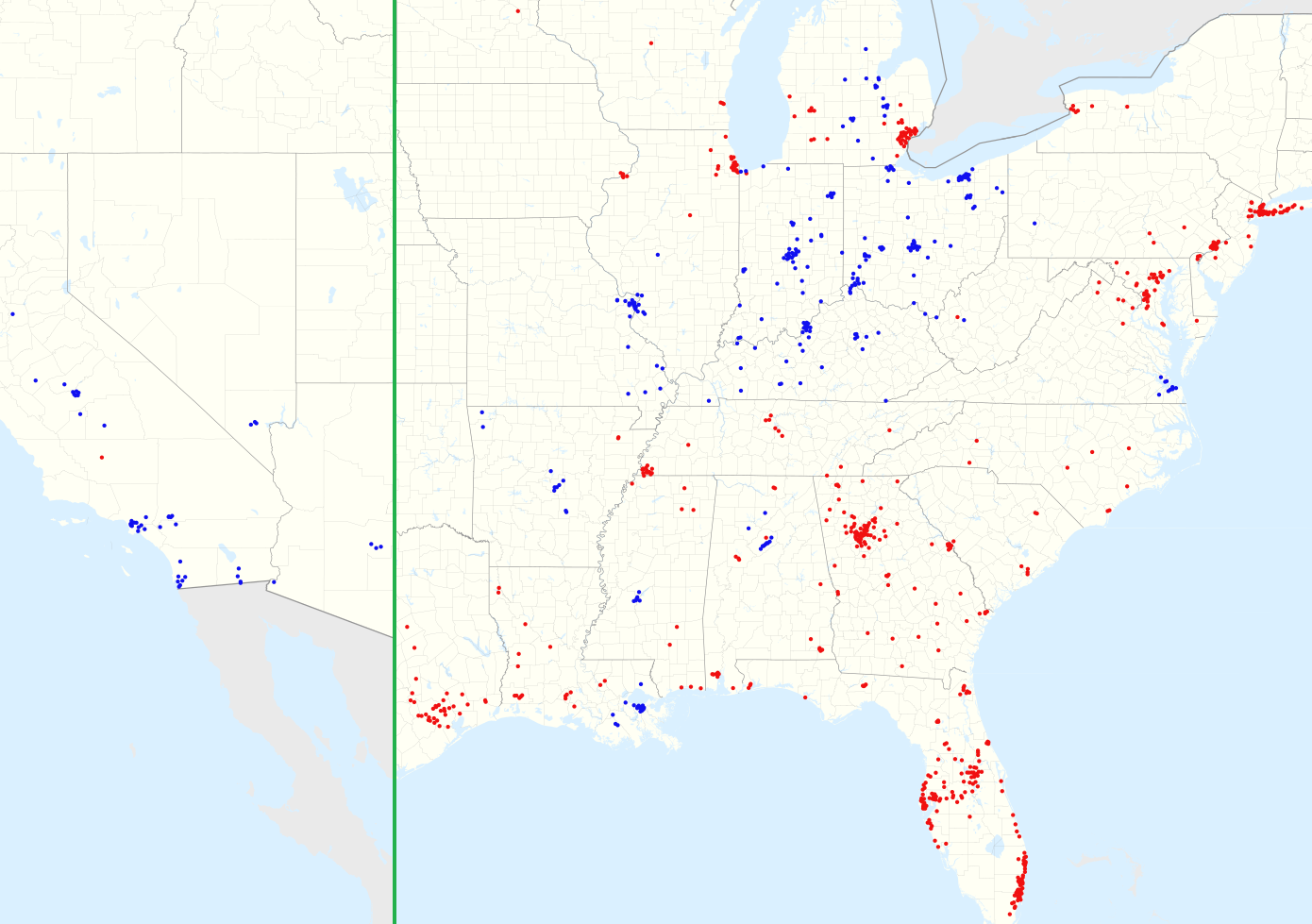
A map of locations, February 2021. (red: Checkers, blue: Rally's)

Checkers Drive-In Restaurants, Inc. is an American fast food double drive-through chain franchise in the United States. The company operates Checkers and Rally's restaurants in 20 states and the District of Columbia. They specialize in hamburgers, hot dogs, french fries, milkshakes, and drinks.

== Overview ==
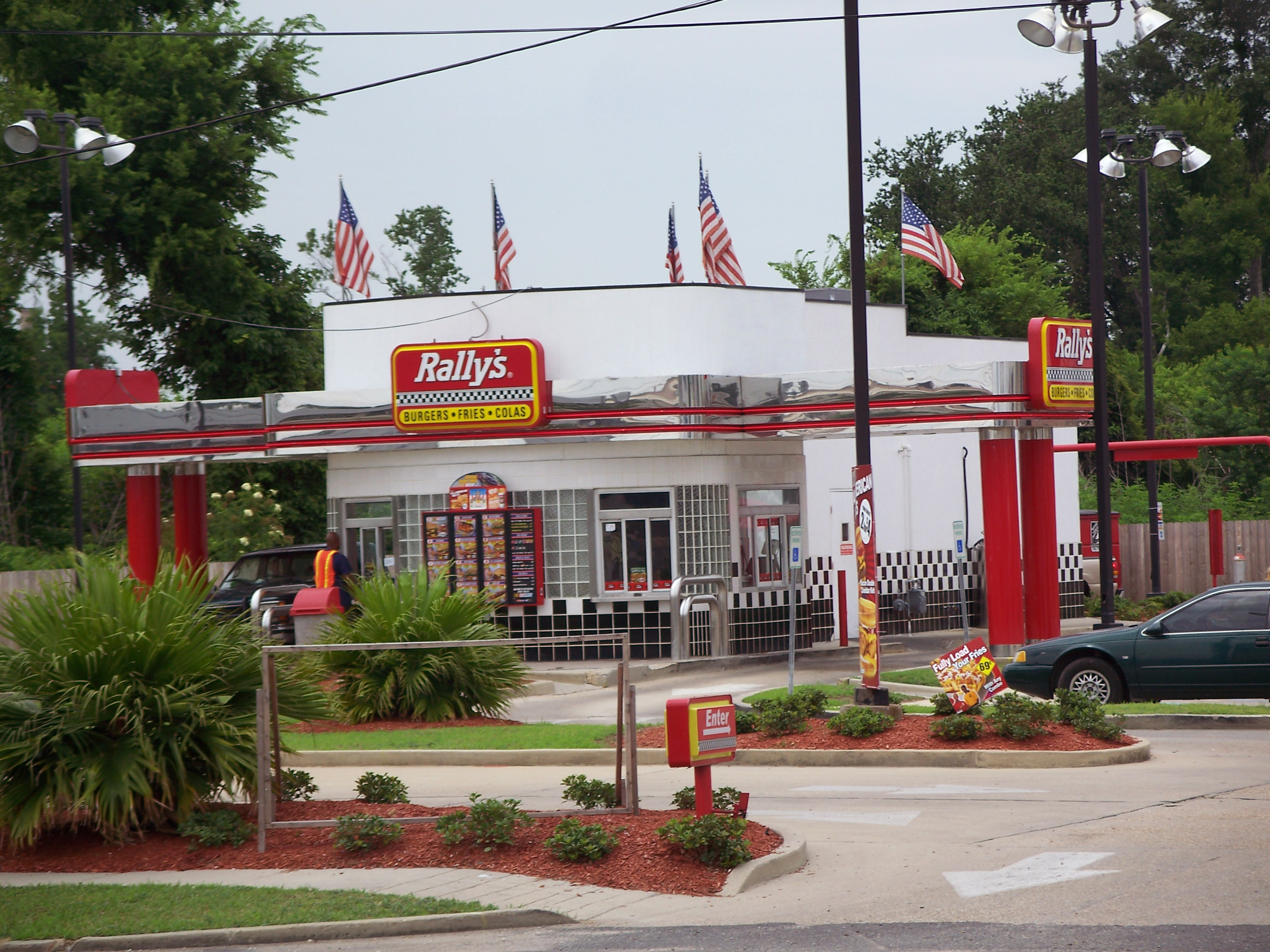
An exterior of a Rally's in Metairie, Louisiana

Originally separate companies serving different geographic areas, with Checkers serving the Southeast and Rally's serving the Midwest, Checkers and Rally's merged in August 1999. Generally speaking, the Checkers name remains used in the Southeast and the Northeast. The Rally's name remains used in the Midwest and California. The two brands have overlapped in several areas.

The merged company is headquartered in Tampa, Florida. Most locations specialize in carryout service with drive-through and "walk-up" windows available, with no indoor seating. Some legacy Rally's locations in the Midwest retain dining rooms, as do two Checkers locations with indoor dining areas in Clearwater, Orlando, and Tavares, Florida.

Checkers was founded in 1986 in Mobile, Alabama by Jim Mattei and went public in 1991. Rally's was founded in 1984, with its first location opening in Nashville, Tennessee, in January 1985. Between 1990 and 1992, Rally's absorbed Maxie's Better Burgers (19 units), Snapps Drive-Thru (43 units), and St. Louis based Zipps Drive-Thru (45 units).

In 1996, Rally's was bought by CKE Restaurants, a parent company of Carl's Jr. and Hardee's. In 1999, CKE sold Rally's to Checkers. Unlike the two CKE chains, which have alternated between marketing Carl's Jr. and Hardee's as one chain or separate regional chains that both share Carl's Jr's Happy Star logo and imaging, but have largely separate menus, Checkers promptly merged Rally's into its branding, and the two chains are now only different by name.

In June 2006, the company went private through a merger with Taxi Holdings Corp., an affiliate of Wellspring Capital Management, a private equity firm. In 2014, Wellspring sold Checkers to another private equity firm, Sentinel Capital Partners. In April 2017, Checkers was sold to Oak Hill Capital Partners for $525 million.

In May 2018, Checkers announced a planned expansion for over two dozen locations in the Pittsburgh area. Despite Rally's having brand recognition in the area, the locations were to be branded as Checkers. The company made its official return in the area in 2019 under the Rally's brand with the opening of a location in Penn Hills.

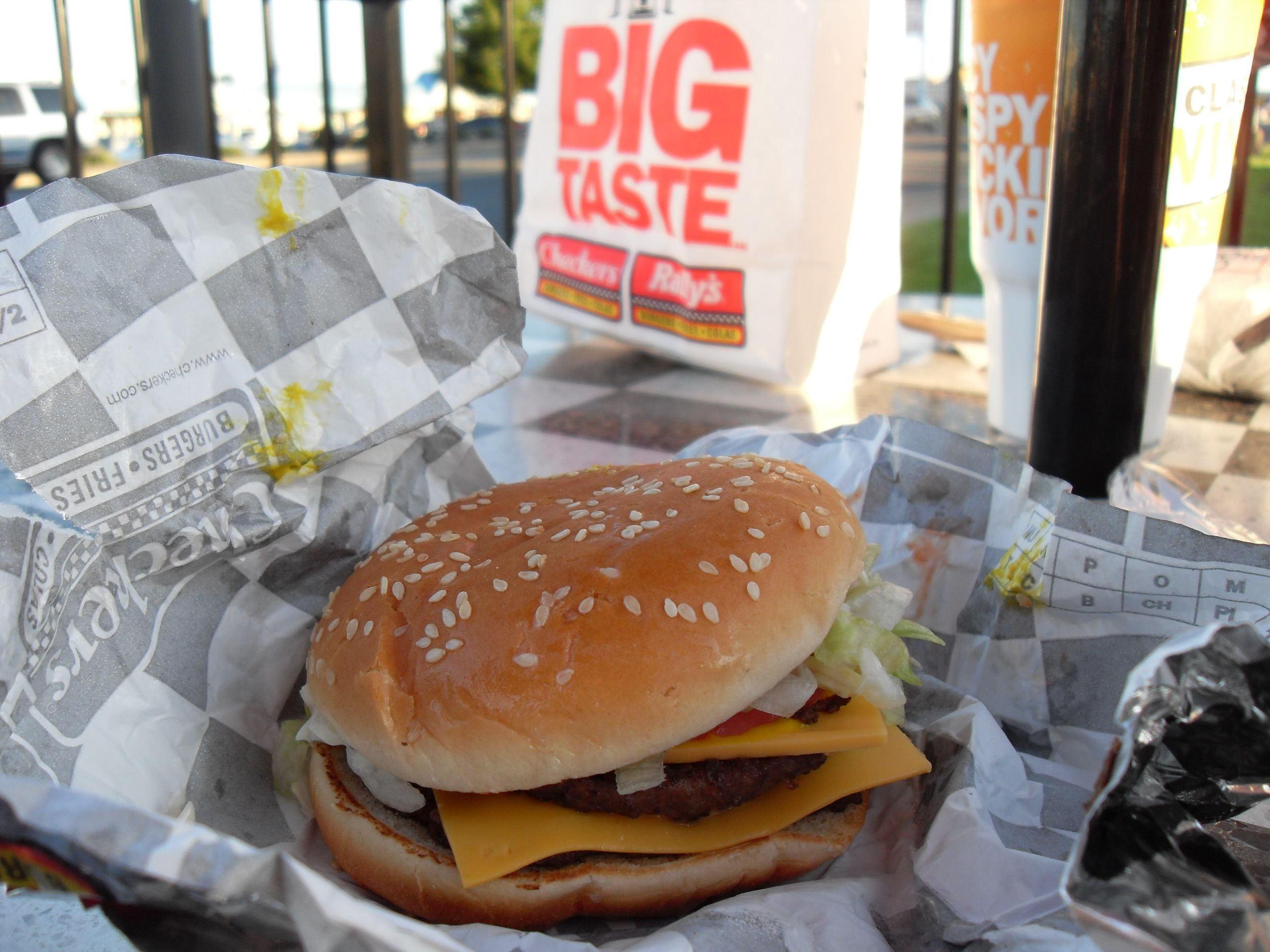
The Big Buford burger

In February 2020, Checkers & Rally's named Frances Allen, former CEO of Boston Market, as their new CEO. She left the position in April 2024 and was replaced by Chris Tebben, former President of Mars Retail Group, in September 2024.

=== Advertising and promotions ===
Rally's earliest advertising campaigns used the slogan "Beep Beep", emulating the sound of a car horn. In 1991, the company debuted a campaign developed by marketing firm McCabe and Company. The most popular of these ads starred Seth Green as an employee of the fictional restaurant "Pricey's", who took delight in using cheap gimmicks and gouging customers. These ads helped popularized the phrase "Cha-Ching", which at one point was trademarked by Rally's. Checkers advertising often targeted other fast-food chains' practices, with one set of ads claiming that reheated burgers would be better used as sports equipment.

One of the first advertising campaigns by the combined companies from 1999 to late 2000 featured the slogan "High Performance Human Fuel". The television advertisements for the campaign were animated in an anime style, featuring a woman named Holly, in pursuit of fast food. The ads were created by Crispin Porter & Bogusky, and illustrated by Peter Chung, who was also responsible for the animation of MTV series Æon Flux.

In September 2007, ML Rogers, an advertising agency, won the advertising rights for Checkers Restaurants, and completely restructured the advertising campaign. Among the many changes is their new slogan, "little place. BIG TASTE", beginning October 2007. In 2007, the chain used a character called Rap Cat, a stuffed animal cat who performs a rap song about the chain. The ad campaign became popular after it became a viral video on YouTube.

The company gave away paper bags patterned like a basketball jersey to be worn by cats, with slots to cut out for the legs and tail, and asked customers to post videos of their cat wearing it to a Rap Cat website. This received criticism from animal rights activists, though Checkers stated that the packaging was "intended only as a creative extension of our television campaign."

In September 2014, Checkers and Rally's debuted a character called Mr. Bag, a talking bag who appears in the new commercials for Checkers and Rally's.

In September 2016, rapper and restaurateur Rick Ross stated his plans for a partnership with Checkers and Rally's, including ownership of a few franchises. He opened his first franchise location in Miami in early 2017.

=== Security and privacy ===
In May 2019, Checkers and Rally's disclosed a long-running data breach that affected an unknown number of customers at 103 of its Checkers and Rally's locations, with some being infected with a point-of-sale malware as early as 2015.
