= American Freight =

American retail company

- Trade name: American Freight Appliances & Furniture
- Company type: Subsidiary
- Industry: Retail
- Founded: 1994; 32 years ago in Lima, Ohio (first run); 2025; 1 year ago (second run)
- Founder: Steve Belford
- Defunct: December 30, 2024; 17 months ago (first run)
- Fate: Bankruptcy and liquidation
- Headquarters: Delaware, Ohio, U.S.
- Number of locations: 370 (March 2023)
- Key people: Peter Corsa (CEO); Jeffrey Seghi (CFO)
- Products: Furniture, mattresses and home appliances
- Number of employees: 2,000 (2022)
- Parent: Franchise Group
- Website: americanfreight.com

American Freight Appliances & Furniture, or American Freight, is an American retail furniture chain founded in Lima, Ohio in 1994. The company was acquired in 2020 by Franchise Group and combined with former Sears Outlet stores under the American Freight name.

== History ==
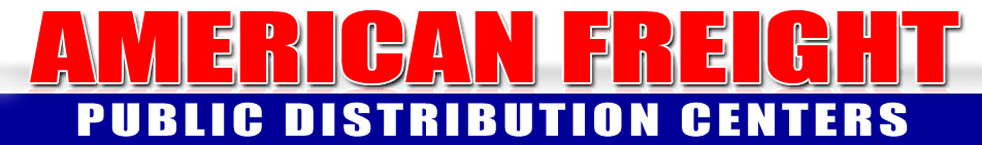
Original American Freight logo and tagline

The first American Freight store was founded by Steve Belford in Lima, Ohio in 1994 as American Freight Furniture & Mattress.

By 2014, the company was operating 95 stores in 18 states, and October that year was acquired by an affiliate of private equity firm The Jordan Company of New York.

The company was acquired by Franchise Group for US$450M on February 14, 2020, and combined with the former Sears Outlet stores under the brand American Freight Furniture, Mattress, Appliance.

On November 2, 2024, Franchise Group announced that they were preparing to file for Chapter 11 bankruptcy after months of losses and turmoil caused by its owner, B. Riley Financial. On November 3, 2024, Franchise Group and all of its affiliated subsidiaries filed for Chapter 11 bankruptcy protection in Delaware. The company plans to keep all of its brands open during the procedure, omit American Freight. The company suffered major losses due to high rising costs and macroeconomic challenges. Liquidation sales began on November 5, with stores closing by the end of the year. However, in January 2025, a U.S. bankruptcy judge approved the sale of up to 28 American Freight stores and one distribution center to AF Newco I LLC. 2 additional locations were also included in the sale, but were eventually withheld due to possible state law issues. AF Newco I LLC plans to reopen the 28 locations and distribution center later into 2025.
