= Transformco =

Holding company of Sears and Kmart since 2019

Transform SR Brands LLC
- Trade name: TransformCo
- Type: Private
- Industry: Retail
- Genre: Big-box stores; Department stores
- Predecessors: Sears Holdings Corporation
- Founded: February 11, 2019; 7 years ago
- Founder: Eddie Lampert
- Headquarters: Hoffman Estates, Illinois, U.S.
- Areas served: Mainland United States; Puerto Rico (until August 31, 2025; 14 months ago); Guam; U.S. Virgin Islands
- Key people: Eddie Lampert (Chairman and CEO); Antoine Farris (CFO)
- Owner: ESL Investments
- Number of employees: 45,000 (2019)
- Divisions: Kmart; Sears; Sears Hometown Stores (2019–2022)
- Website: transformco.com

Transform SR Brands LLC (doing business as TransformCo, referred to as "New Sears") is an American privately held company formed on February 11, 2019, to acquire some of the assets of Sears Holdings Corporation. The new company is owned by ESL Investments. Following the Chapter 11 bankruptcy filing of Sears Holdings on October 15, 2018, Transformco purchased the surviving assets owned by Sears Holdings for $5.2 billion.

On June 3, 2019, it was announced that Transformco would acquire Sears Hometown and Outlet Stores. As per the deal, Sears Hometown might need to divest its Sears Outlet division to gain approval.

Since its formation, Transformco has been "transition[ing] from being a retailer with real estate to becoming a real estate operating company."

== History ==
=== Sears Holdings ===
On November 17, 2004, the management of Kmart Holding Corporation announced its intention to purchase Sears, Roebuck and Co. under a new corporation. Kmart previously emerged from Chapter 11 bankruptcy protection on May 6, 2003. The new corporation became Sears Holdings Corporation, simply known as Sears Holdings. The new corporation announced that it would continue to operate stores under both the Sears and Kmart brands. The merger of Kmart and Sears closed on March 24, 2005, following affirmative shareholder votes of both companies. The result of the merger was Kmart and parent Kmart Holding Corporation and Sears became subsidiaries of the new Sears Holdings Corporation. Sears Holdings then operated Sears and Kmart stores. The company continued to market products under brands held by both companies. The merger was completed on March 24, 2005, after receiving regulatory approval from the government and approval by shareholders of both companies. The combined company had approximately 3,500 stores at the time of the merger.

Eddie Lampert led the company for the next thirteen years. On October 10, 2018, it was reported that Sears Holdings had engaged advisors regarding an imminent bankruptcy filing.

The company filed for Chapter 11 bankruptcy protection on October 15, 2018, in New York; the same day that a $134 million debt payment was due.

On October 15, 2018, Sears Holdings announced that it would close 142 stores, including 63 Kmart stores and 79 Sears stores. Sears Holdings' bankruptcy also marked Kmart's second bankruptcy in 16 years. On November 8, 2018, Sears Holdings announced it would close an additional 40 stores, including 11 Kmart and 29 Sears stores. On November 23, 2018, Sears Holdings released a list of 505 stores, including 239 Kmart and 266 Sears stores, that were for sale in the bankruptcy process while all others were holding liquidation sales. However, the stores for sale were not guaranteed to be protected from liquidation in the future. On December 28, 2018, Sears Holdings announced it would close 80 additional stores, including 37 Kmart and 43 Sears stores.

In a proposal announced in early January, Sears Holdings planned only to keep 202 Kmart stores along with 223 Sears stores open, assuming that it survived the bankruptcy process. Most of the proposed locations were in highly populated coastal regions.

On January 15, 2019, when it had appeared that Sears Holdings was preparing to file for Chapter 7 liquidation, the bankruptcy court judge ordered the company to return to the negotiation table and work out a new deal with Eddie Lampert to prevent the liquidation from occurring. A new deal was struck at the last minute that would keep up to 400 Sears and Kmart stores operating. On January 19, 2019, Sears Holdings officially announced that they had won the auction, and that some of the then existing stores were to remain open.

On January 24, 2019, a group of unsecured creditors, which included Simon Property Group, filed a motion with the bankruptcy court to overturn the deal Sears Holdings had recently made with Lampert claiming that Lampert had been "engaged in serial asset stripping" of the company at the expense of suppliers and landlords. The creditors had requested that the bankruptcy court rule to have the company be liquidated instead of being reorganized so that the creditors would be able to recover more money that was still owed to them. On January 28, the federal government-operated Pension Benefit Guaranty Corporation announced that they were not in favor of the current Sears Holding agreement with Lampert since that agreement would create a $1.7 billion funding gap in the employee pension fund that would require the American tax-payers to cover the shortfall. In papers filed on February 1 with the bankruptcy court, ESL "outlined plans to close three Kmart stores per month in 2019" if the court decides to accept ESL's purchase bid.

In February 2019, it was announced that a U.S. bankruptcy judge approved the sale of the most lucrative part of Sears Holdings to Edward Lampert, allowing the surviving part of the company that operates both Sears and Kmart to remain in business at the expense of suppliers, landlords, employees, pensioners, the U.S. government, and other creditors. Kmart would have 202 locations after the sale was completed.

=== Birth of Transformco ===
In February 2019, the company finalized the acquisition of 425 stores (223 Sears and 202 Kmart) from Sears Holdings for $5.2 billion. Stores not purchased by Transformco were immediately liquidated. During bankruptcy proceeding of Sears Holdings, ESL, the parent company of both "old Sears" and "new Sears", told the court that it had "plans to close three Kmart stores per month in 2019" if the court decides to accept ESL's purchase bid.

In June 2019, Sears customers discovered that they were having a hard time getting warranties honored for items previously purchased from Sears.

=== New store closures and assets reduction under Transformco ===
On August 6, 2019, it was announced that Transformco would be closing 26 stores, including 5 Kmarts and 21 Sears stores, in October. These closures would result in approximately 380 remaining stores. On August 31, 2019, it was announced that Transformco would close an additional 92 stores, including 77 Kmarts and 15 Sears stores, by the end of 2019.

On November 7, 2019, it was announced that Transformco would close an additional 96 stores, including 45 Kmarts and 51 Sears stores, February 2020, leaving 70 Kmart stores in 19 states, Guam, Puerto Rico, and United States Virgin Islands, and 123 Sears stores, respectively. At least one source reported in November 2019 that Transformco would have a total of 182 full Sears and Kmart stores remaining after the 96 announced stores were closed by February 2020.

In December 2019, Transformco sold the DieHard brand to Advance Auto Parts for $200 million. Under this agreement, Sears and Kmart can continue to sell DieHard branded batteries through their stores while Advance Auto Parts has exclusive rights to the DieHard brand in the automotive and vehicular supplies and service industries.

Throughout June and July 2020, Sears' job website indicated that over twenty more stores were in the process of closing.

In December 2021, Transformco announced its plans to sell the Sears headquarters in Hoffman Estates. The property was eventually sold to a data center developer in the Summer of 2023 with plans to have the existing buildings demolished by Fall 2023. The fate of the Sears headquarters staff was not published.

In 2022, the owner of Sears confirmed that the last full-line Sears store in Pennsylvania, in Abington Township, Montgomery County, was closing. On January 21, 2022, the last remaining Searstown in Fort Lauderdale, Florida abruptly closed at the end of the day without any prior announcement or liquidation.

On August 29, 2022, it was announced that the Sears at Newburgh Mall would be closing in fall of 2022, marking the end of an era after 43 years as the last original anchor store in the mall as well as the last Sears department store in New York. The closing date for this store was announced two days later on August 31, 2022, in a Facebook post with the final day of operation being Sunday, October 16, 2022.

On September 22, 2022, it was announced that Sears would be closing at the Valley Mall in Union Gap, Washington, by Sunday, November 20, 2022. A day later, it was announced that Sears would be closing at Burbank Town Center in Burbank, California, the last original anchor from opening day of 1991. This was also the last store in the Greater Los Angeles Area to be connected to a mall. On October 15, 2022, it was announced that the only remaining Kmart store in Puerto Rico at the Plaza Las Americas would be closed by the end of that month.

The last Sears in Maryland closed its store at the Francis Scott Key Mall on January 15, 2023. On March 28, 2023, the Kmart store in Miami, Florida downsized and moved to the garden area of the store. The rest of the store will be leased to home decor giant At Home. On April 14, 2023, it was announced that the last Sears store in North Carolina would close by the end of May. On June 5, 2023, it was announced that the Kmart store located at the Sunshine Mall in St. Croix would close. On August 2, 2023, it was announced that the last Kmart store in New Jersey will close September 30, 2023.

== Transforming into a commercial real estate company ==
In a June 2023 interview with the president for real estate at Transformco, Scott Carr, Carr explained that the company was "transition[ing] from being a retailer with real estate to becoming a real estate operating company." In an earlier statement, Carr stated that "Transformco continues to pursue opportunities to create value from its real estate portfolio and to partner with retailers, property owners and communities as part of the ongoing reinvention of retail real estate."

In 2021, Transformco acquired the ownership of a vacant property that it had previously leased for a K-mart on Long Island, made improvements and leased the property to three separate tenants, Aldi, At Home, and Floor & Decor.

In 2022, Transformco formed a partnership with New Jersey-based developer Russo Development to build 530 rental units and 190 for-sale units on the site of a former Sears store in New Brunswick, New Jersey, with construction expected to be completed by 2027. The development also includes a grocery store and a restaurant.

== Sears Hometown Stores ==
On June 3, 2019, it was announced that Transformco would acquire Sears Hometown and Outlet Stores. As a part of the deal, Sears Hometown may need to divest its Sears Outlet division to gain regulatory approval. At the time of the announcement, Sears Hometown and Outlet Stores had 491 Hometown stores and 126 Outlet stores in 49 states, Puerto Rico and Bermuda. 98% of the Hometown stores are owner operated franchise operations.

On October 23, 2019, Sears Hometown and Outlet Stores completed its sale of its Sears Outlet division to Franchise Group, Inc. while Transformco completed the acquisition of the remainder of Sears Hometown at the end of the same business day. Sears Hometown had 414 stores at the time of its acquisition by Transformco in October 2019.

In January 2020, The Wall Street Journal reported that Sears Hometown franchisees were having trouble getting needed inventory from Transformco and also being penalized if they tried to match prices on products sold on Sears.com.

Chain Store Age estimated in May 2022 that approximately 100 Hometown stores were in the process of closing.

In December 2022, Sears Hometown Stores, Inc., filed for Chapter 11 bankruptcy and plans to liquidate the inventory at all of its 115 stores. In the bankruptcy proceedings, Eddie Lampert is listed as a 37.75% owner of Sears Hometown. The websites for both Sears Hometown Stores and for Sears Home Appliance Showroom were deactivated shortly after the bankruptcy announcement.

== Subsidiaries ==
=== Current ===
==== Kmart division ====
- Kmart – a chain of discount stores that are usually free-standing or located in strip malls. They carry most standard department store stock as well as a limited selection of grocery items. As of September 2024, the company maintains a small convenience store version of the brand in Miami, Florida as well as full-line stores in Guam and the US Virgin Islands.

==== Sears division ====
- Sears – a chain of department stores that are usually located in shopping malls, with a few freestanding locations. As of December 2024 only 8 Sears full line department stores remain in operation. These stores carry traditional, middle-class priced department store items as well as an expanded appliance and tools section.
  - Sears Home Services – a division of Sears that provides appliance repair, lawn and garden maintenance, and HVAC service. As of 2025, Sears Home Services remains active under the Transformco umbrella, continuing to offer nationwide repair and maintenance for Kenmore and other major brands. Although Transformco last explored the possibility of trying to find a buyer for this division back in 2020, Transformco has not completed any sale of the division as of 2025.

==== Other subsidiaries ====
- Kenmore – a brand of household appliances, cookware, floorcare, grills, HVAC equipment and other home items

=== Former ===
==== Kmart division ====
- Kmart – Kmart closed down or sold these divisions:
  - Big Kmart stores – chain of discount department stores that carried everything a regular Kmart carries, but with an emphasis on home decor, children's clothing, and an expanded food section. The Big Kmart format has been long discontinued, but the Big Kmart signage was still common for most Kmart stores at time of closure.
  - Super Kmart Center – a brand of supercenters that combined a regular Kmart with full line grocery, similar to Walmart. Many locations had an auto center and Kmart express gas station on site. The final location was located in Niles, Ohio, which closed in 2018.
  - KGRO – a brand of Kmart that was used exclusively in each store's Garden Shop. While at first was used for such things as KGRO garden and power equipment, it was later used as Kmart's brand of fertilizers and plant seeds.
  - K-Fresh – a new format that was implemented in several Super Kmart Center locations, which extended the grocery section into a store-within-a-store model.
  - mygofer – a hybrid-online retail concept launched in spring of 2009, where products are ordered ahead of time and then are either shipped to the customer or held at a local Kmart for the customer to pick up. The service was quietly discontinued in 2020 after Kmart shut down most of its stores.

==== Sears division ====
- Sears – Sears closed down or sold these divisions:
  - Sears Grand – a sub-chain of Sears stores, typically located away from shopping malls and arranged in a fashion similar to a big-box store. Many Sears Grand locations were retrofit remodels of existing Kmart or Sears stores in freestanding locations. They carried an expanded inventory, as compared with full-line Sears Department Stores, and had range from 165,000 to 210,000 square feet (15,300 to 19,500 m^{2}). The second to last open Sears Grand store located in Thornton, CO closed on May 2, 2021; the last open Sears Grand was located in Rancho Cucamonga, CA, closing on May 15, 2021, one day sooner than originally expected.
  - Sears Hometown and Outlet Stores – was spun off from Sears in 2012 and partially reacquired by the reorganized company in 2019. The Sears Hometown brand was retained, while the Outlet division was sold off.
    - Sears Appliance and Hardware Store – hardware stores that carried the entire line of Sears hardware and appliances. Website was terminated sometime after October 2019.
    - Sears Outlet Stores - outlet version of Sears department stores located in various retail locations across the U.S., as well as online. Sold to Franchise Group, Inc in October 2019.
  - Innovel Solutions – Formerly known as Sears Logistics, acted as the supply chain arm for Sears Holding Company and served clients such as Costco, the Air Force Exchange, the Navy Exchange, and former Sears brand Lands' End. The company specialized in storing and moving items of all sizes, including furniture, large appliances, and even entire wine cellars. It provided 'final mile' delivery, complete installation and white glove capabilities for 'big and bulky' products across the United States and Puerto Rico. Sold to Costco on March 17, 2020
  - Wally Labs – a subsidiary created when Sears Holdings purchased the rights to WallyHome sensor technology from SNUPI Technologies in 2015. The company provided technology for home safety, security, and loss prevention. Wally Labs' website had disappeared by May 2022.
  - Sears Auto Centers – a subsidiary created to sell and install tires and batteries and to perform other simple car maintenance. Closed in January 2022.
  - Monark Premium Appliances – Premium appliance showrooms for architects, builders, designers, developers, and homeowners to browse. Monark was created in 2015 by Sears Holding Company. Monark’s California and Nevada branches were acquired by Ferguson Enterprises at the end of August 2022, and the remaining Florida locations were shut down.

==== Sears Hometown division ====
- Sears Hometown – formerly sold home appliances, lawn and garden equipment, apparel, mattresses, sporting goods, and tools. All stores in this division were individually owned and operated by independent franchisees.
  - Sears Hometown Store - stores that sold Sears merchandise.

=== Allied brands that were owned and operated by third parties ===
Independent companies that provided services under the Sears brand:

- Sears Credit Card – Sears credit card and Sears MasterCard were owned and operated by Citibank since 2003. In February 2025, Citibank notified Sears Mastercard customers that their Sears branded cards were being replaced with Citi ThankYou Mastercard. After April 2025, Citibank was no longer affiliated with Sears and the Sears credit card program ceased to exist.
- Sears Flowers – an online store that was owned and operated by Teleflora which sold flowers, plants and gifts for same-day delivery via the Teleflora network. Their website became inactive sometime after July 2021.
- Sears Optical – a licensed brand that was owned and operated by Luxottica until February 2020. They previously provided comprehensive vision exams, contact lenses, diagnostic and medical treatment of eye diseases, urgent care, cataract and glaucoma surgery consultation/referrals, low vision treatment, and an eyeglass dispensary. Luxottica terminated their relationship with Sears and closed all remaining Sears Optical locations in February 2020.
- Sears Travel – an online travel agency owned and operated by International Cruise & Excursion Gallery, which provided online and telephone-based booking services for Sears customers through the SearsTravel.com website. Sears Travel shut down on July 31, 2020.

== Lawsuits ==
=== Sears Holdings ===
In March 2019, Sears Holdings sued Transform Holdco for $57.5 million it says was owed from the sale. Sears Holdings also said Transformco owes $41.3 million for credit card and cash transactions that occurred before the sale closed, as well as $16.2 million for a portion of February rent.

A hearing on the matter was anticipated to take place on March 21, 2019. The lawsuit was settled in January 2020 with Transformco paying the bankrupt Sears Holdings $18.3 million. A portion went to Sears creditors.

=== Bangladeshi suppliers ===
In June 2020, a group of 19 Bangladeshi suppliers filed a $40 million lawsuit against Transformco for canceled orders that had already been shipped and stuck in American warehouses. The lawsuit was settled out-of-court in January 2021 for $6.3 million.

=== Sears Hometown related lawsuits ===
In December 2024, a new lawsuit was filed by a trustee of Sears Hometown Stores against Transformco and other entities controlled by Eddie Lampert, for $177M.

In re Sears Hometown & Outlet Stores Stockholder Litig., No. 2019-0798-JTL (Del. Ch. Feb. 13, 2025), the minority stockholders of Sears Hometown and Outlet Stores, Inc. filed a lawsuit against Transform Holdco LLC and Edward "Eddie" S. Lampert for not giving proper compensation for their shares when Transformco acquired Sears Hometown and Outlet Stores in 2019 and later render those shares valueless when Hometown was forced to file for bankruptcy in 2022.
