= Franchise Group =

American holding company

Franchise Group, Inc.
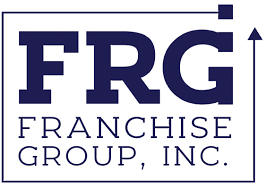
- Type: Private
- Traded as: Nasdaq: FRG
- Genre: Franchising; Retail
- Founded: 2019; 7 years ago
- Founder: Brian R. Kahn
- Headquarters: Delaware, Ohio
- Key people: Brian R. Kahn (CEO); Eric Seeton (CFO)
- Revenue: ▲$4.937 billion (2023)
- Net income: ▼$-68.573 million (2023)
- Website: www.franchisegrp.com

Franchise Group, Inc. is an American privately held holding company that acquires and manages mainly franchise companies. Before its 2024 bankruptcy, it owned several brands in various retail industries including American Freight, Buddy's Home Furnishings, The Vitamin Shoppe, and Pet Supplies Plus.

On August 21, 2023, it was announced that a consortium of investors had acquired Franchise Group for $2.6 billion.

== History ==
Founded in 2019 through the merger of Liberty Tax and Buddy's Home Furnishings, it originally operated under the name Liberty Tax. However, when it was renamed Franchise Group, the company retained Liberty Tax and Buddy's Home Furnishings as its subsidiaries.

One year after purchasing The Vitamin Shoppe and Sears Outlet, the company purchased American Freight for $450 million in cash in 2020. - then Sears Outlet merged into American Freight.

On November 5, 2020, Franchise Group announced that it would acquire Fort Smith, Arkansas-based regional furniture retailer FFO Home, which filed for Chapter 11 bankruptcy protection on the same day. The acquisition was completed on December 29.

In the year it sold Liberty Tax to NextPoint Financial for $249 million, Franchise Group made numerous acquisitions in 2021. Around that time, it purchased Pet Supplies Plus in a deal valued at $700 million, Sylvan Learning for $81 million, and Badcock Home Furniture for $580 million.

In August, a group of investors bought Franchise Group for US$2.6 billion. In November 2023, Kahn was identified by Bloomberg as one of two co-conspirators in a securities fraud case, following the guilty plea of John Hughes, co-founder of Prophecy Asset Management

In December 2023, Conn's acquired Badcock Home Furniture &more from the Franchise Group. Conn's ended up filing for Chapter 11 bankruptcy in July 2024, and liquidated all of its namesake and Badcock stores by October 2024.

In February 2024, Unleashed Brands, owner of The Little Gym and Urban Air Trampoline Park, acquired Sylvan Learning from Franchise Group for an undisclosed amount.

On November 2, 2024, Franchise Group announced that they were preparing to file for Chapter 11 bankruptcy after months of losses and turmoil caused by its owner, B. Riley Financial. HPS Investment Partners, a private equity firm, amongst other lenders, will take over the company once the restructuring is completed. On November 3, 2024, Franchise Group and all of its affiliated subsidiaries filed for Chapter 11 bankruptcy protection in Delaware. The company plans to keep its Pet Supplies Plus, The Vitamin Shoppe, and Buddy's Home Furnishings stores open during the procedure, while it plans to liquidate American Freight. American Freight suffered major losses due to high rising costs and macroeconomic challenges. Liquidation sales are set to begin on November 5, with most stores shuttering by the end of the year. However, in January 2025, a U.S. bankruptcy judge approved the sale of up to 28 American Freight stores and one distribution center to AF Newco I LLC. 2 additional locations were also included in the sale, but were eventually withheld due to possible state law issues. AF Newco I LLC plans to reopen the 28 locations and distribution center later into 2025.

In April 2025, Franchise Group announced the sale of The Vitamin Shoppe to Kingswood Capital Management and Performance Investment Partners for $193.5 million. The deal was finalized on May 15, 2025.

On June 6, 2025, Franchise Group exited its bankruptcy after its reorganization plan was approved on June 2. Its remaining assets, Pet Supplies Plus, Buddy's Home Furnishings and Wag ‘N Wash, were sold to Fusion Parent LLC for an undisclosed amount.

== Former subsidiaries ==
- Sears Outlet Stores; outlet version of Sears department stores located in various retail locations across the U.S., as well as online. Sold to Franchise Group in October 2019 while Transform Holdco completed the acquisition of the remainder of Sears Hometown at the end of the same business day. In April 2020, Sears Outlet was merged into American Freight and the stores were rebranded American Freight.
- Liberty Tax; facilitates refund-based tax settlement financial products, including tax preparation, refund anticipation loans, electronic refund checks, and personal income tax refund discounting. Liberty Tax Service conducts its business in the United States.
- Badcock Home Furniture &more; furniture store chain with over 370 company and dealer owned furniture stores in eight states across the southeastern United States.
- Sylvan Learning; supplemental learning centers which provide personalized instruction in reading, writing, mathematics, study skills, homework support, and test preparation for college entrance and state exams.
- The Vitamin Shoppe; offers nutritional supplements in every 785 stores across the U.S., as well as online. Acquired by Franchise Group in December 2019 after Irving Place Capital sold the remaining shares of the company and its division, Super Supplements to Franchise Group in the same year.
- American Freight; a chain of discount furniture and home furnishing stores that was acquired in February 2020
- Buddy's Home Furnishings; offers home furniture including sofas, chairs, dining tables, as well as electronics, and appliances. Buddy's Home Furnishings serves clients in the United States.
- Pet Supplies Plus; offers pet supplies and services in 400-plus locations in 30-plus US states.
