= ESL Investments =

American hedge fund

- Company type: Private
- Industry: Investment
- Genre: Hedge fund
- Founded: April 1988; 38 years ago
- Founder: Eddie Lampert
- Headquarters: Greenwich, Connecticut
- Key people: Eddie Lampert (chairman and CEO); None (president); Raphael DiNapoli (CFO)
- Owner: Eddie Lampert
- Subsidiaries: Transform SR Brands LLC; Seritage Growth Properties

ESL Investments is a privately held hedge fund based in Greenwich, Connecticut.

== History ==
ESL Investments is managed by Edward Lampert, who founded it in April 1988 and named it after his initials. The firm invests in the American public equity and hedging markets. Managing the fund with a contrarian investing approach, Lampert is the company's chairman and chief executive officer, and William Crowley is its president and chief operating officer. ESL is fairly unusual as a hedge fund in that it takes large stakes in a small number of companies and holds them for many years. Most of ESL's portfolio consists of retail companies, particularly Kmart (now Transform SR Brands LLC), by far the company's largest holding (53.5% ownership as of June 2010). The revenue from Kmart plays a big part in helping ESL acquire other companies.

Lampert began trading in stocks at the investment bank Goldman Sachs during the 1980s. In 1988 Lampert founded ESL Investments with the backing of investor Richard E. Rainwater and initial outside investments worth $28 million.

It was reported in 2004 that from 1988 through 2004 the fund returns averaged 29% a year. His clients have included David Geffen (1988 - 2007), Michael Dell, the Tisch family (owners of Loews Corporation), and the Ziff family (owners of Ziff Davis) (1988 - 2013). In 2004, the fund made Lampert the first hedge fund manager ever to make more than $1 billion in a year, when the fund grew 69%, following his decision to buy Kmart and merge it with Sears. At the start of the 2008 financial crisis, however, ESL's retail holdings were severely affected due to a drop in consumer spending, and the company's investment in Citigroup in September 2007 saw a significant drop in value since the fund made its investment. Through the fund, Lampert is worth approximately $2 billion. Lampert, who typically invests in undervalued stocks, is known to have modeled his investing style on Warren Buffett's style by analyzing his annual shareholder letters.

== Assets under management ==
| Year | AUM in Bil. USD$ |
|---|---|
| 1988 | .028 |
| 2003 | 5 |
| 2004 | 4 |
| 2005 | 10 |
| 2006 | 17.5 |
| 2011 | 10 |
| 2012 | 5 |
| 2017 | 1.3 |
