= BRC Group Holdings =

American financial services company

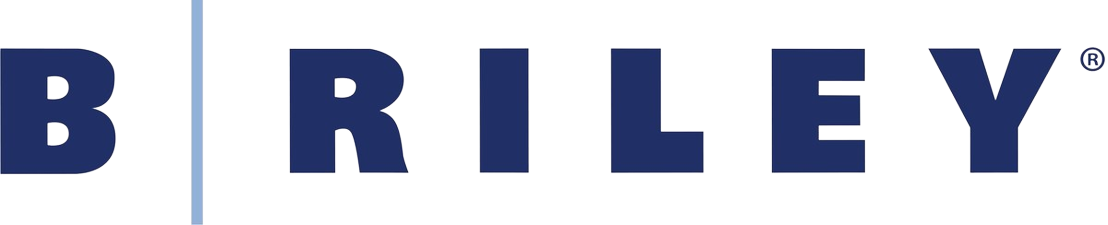

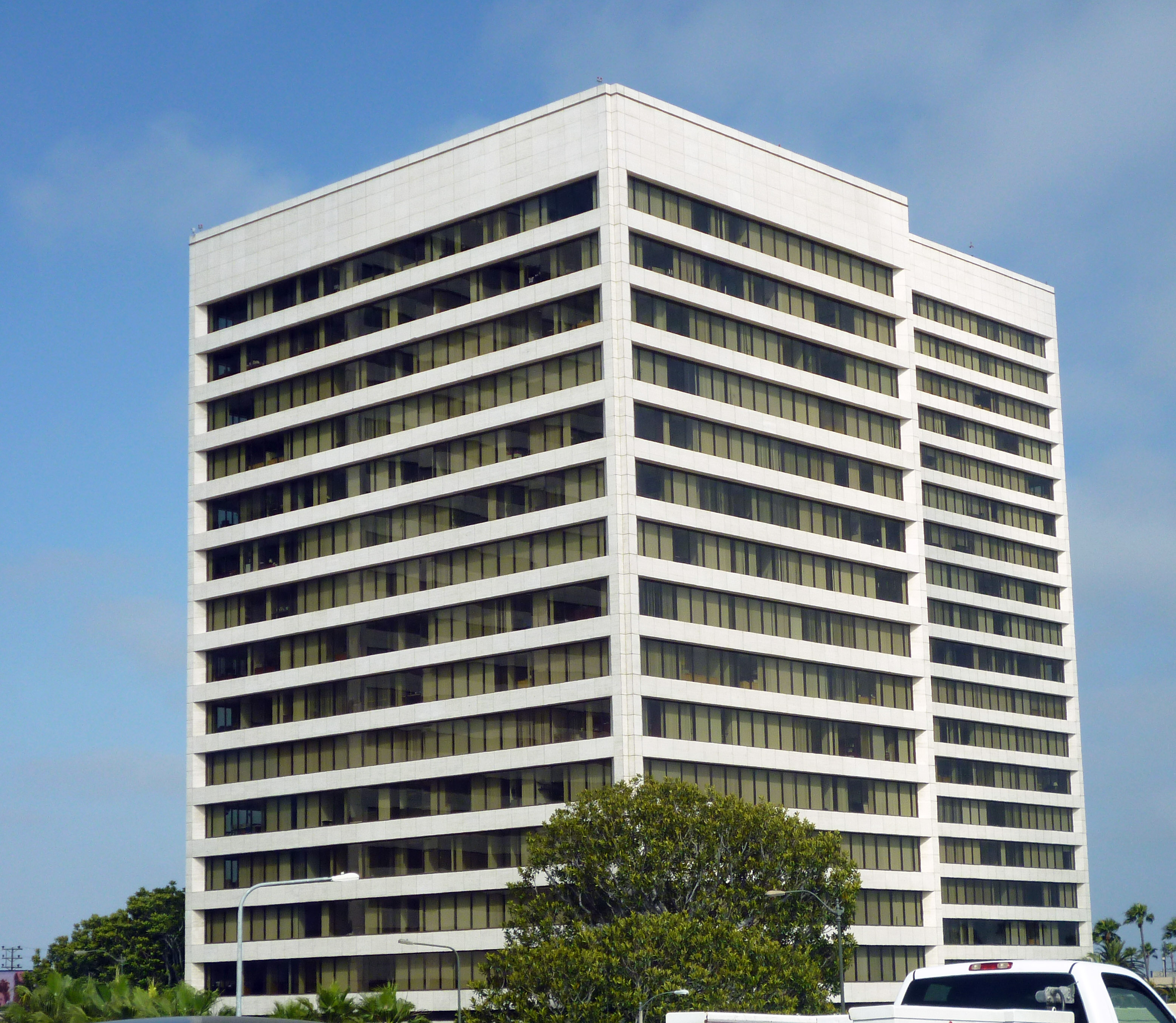
- Headquarters at Westwood Gateway in Los Angeles
- Company type: Public
- Traded as: Nasdaq: RILY
- Industry: Financial services
- Founded: 1997; 29 years ago
- Founders: Bryant Riley; Tom Kelleher
- Headquarters: Westwood Gateway, Los Angeles, California, U.S.
- Key people: Bryant Riley (co-CEO); Tom Kelleher (co-CEO)
- Products: Investment banking; Securities brokerage; Investment management; Wealth management
- Revenue: ▲US$967.6 million (2025)
- Net income: ▲US$299.4 million (2025)
- Total assets: ▼US$1.7 billion (2025)
- Total equity: ▲US$90.4 million (2025)
- Number of employees: ▼1,380 (2025)
- Subsidiaries: B. Riley FBR
- Website: brileyfin.com

BRC Group Holdings (referred to as B. Riley) is an American financial services company headquartered in Los Angeles, California. The company is known for its investment banking services regarding small cap companies as well as retail liquidation services. It has also acquired several organizations and companies in recent years.

== History ==
=== 1997–2000: Early years ===
In 1997, Bryant Riley founded B. Riley & Co. as a stock-picking firm serving institutional investors by providing research on small companies. The firm was fined $5,000 that year by the U.S. Securities and Exchange Commission (SEC) for lax record-keeping.

=== 2001–2020: Acquisitions and growth ===
Initially Riley did not want the firm being involved in investment banking due to conflict of interest issues. However, in July 2003, the firm acquired Friend & Co., a boutique investment bank where Riley once worked.

In 2012, B. Riley acquired Caris & Co., a stock research firm to increase its sales and trading business in the brokerage industry during a slowdown in the industry.

In June 2014, B. Riley & Co. merged with appraisal and liquidation service provider, Great American Group to form B. Riley Financial, a company listed on the OTC Bulletin Board under the ticker "RILY".

In July 2015, B. Riley was approved to be uplisted to the Nasdaq exchange.

In February 2017, B. Riley acquired FBR & Co. in a $160 million deal to further scale its existing business.

In May 2017, B. Riley acquired brokerage company, Wunderlich Securities for $67 million to expand its wealth management business.

In August 2018, B. Riley acquired GlassRatner Advisory & Capital Group, a restructuring advisory firm to expand its advisory presence.

In November 2018, B. Riley acquired 49% stake of broker-dealer National Holdings Corp from Fortress Biotech for $22.9 million. In January 2021, B. Riley acquired the rest of National Holdings Corp. In July 2022, National Holdings Corp's largest subsidiary, National Securities closed down after 75 years with its business being integrated into B. Riley. This came after National Securities was penalized by Financial Industry Regulatory Authority (FINRA).

In April 2020, it was reported that B. Riley was benefitting from the retail apocalypse especially in 2020 due to the COVID-19 pandemic. As many brick-and-mortar retail stores closed, this gave B. Riley a lot of opportunities to provide liquation services.

In June 2020, B. Riley acquired Alderney Advisors, a restructuring firm that specializes in the automotive industry.

=== 2021 to present: Decline ===
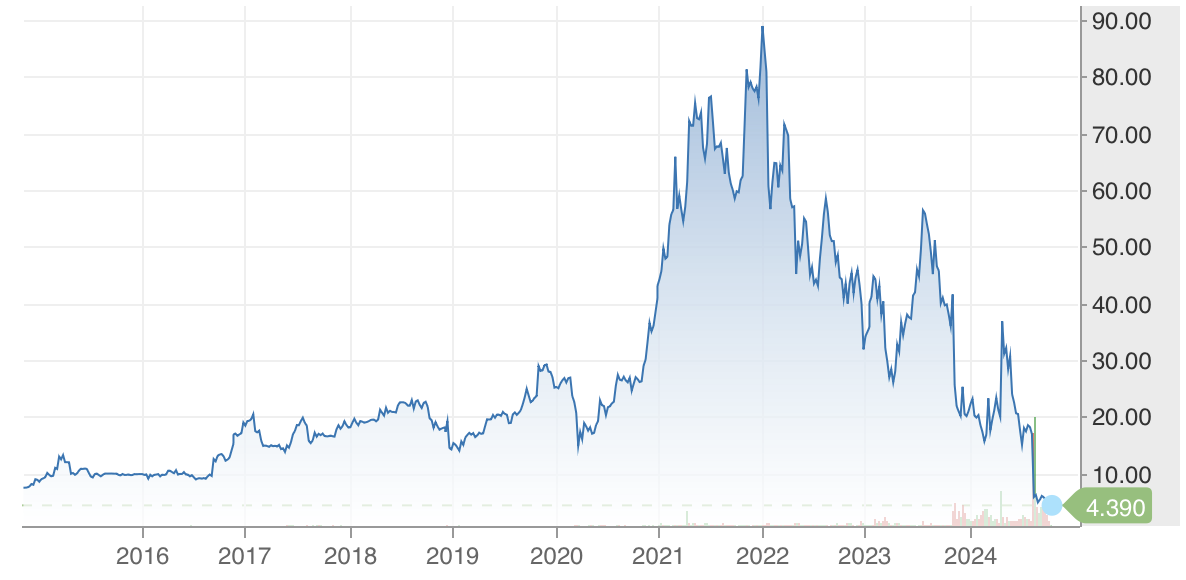
NASDAQ:RILY Stock Chart from 2015 through October 8, 2025. Per CNBC

On April 12, 2021, B. Riley became a constituent member of the S&P 600 index.

In August 2021, B. Riley acquired investment firm 272 Capital.

In January 2022, B. Riley acquired middle market M&A advisor FocalPoint for $175 million.

On February 8, 2023, Wolfpack Research announced it held a short position in B. Riley. It released a report that criticized the company stating during the everything bubble period of 2020 to 2021, B. Riley had overleveraged to buy speculative assets and lent money to companies that have a high likelihood of defaulting. Examples included Exela Technologies which owed B. Riley $75 million and had failed to complete interest payments on another loan on January 17, B Riley Principal 250 Merger Corp, a special-purpose acquisition company that would result in a $175 million loss if it failed to find a target by May 11 and Babcock and Wilcox which owed B. Riley $110 million but was believed by Wolfpack Research to be heading toward bankruptcy. In addition, Wolfpack Research stated that 40% of operating companies in B. Riley's portfolio per its Form 13F had going concern issues. Following the report, B. Riley's stock declined by 11%.

In May 2023, it was noted that B. Riley paid a dividend yield of nearly 11% which was much higher than its peers. It was speculated that the big reason for the increase was due to the sell-off of its stock. This was due to the slowdown in investment banking business as well as unrealized losses from investments. There was skepticism on whether paying such high dividends yields was sustainable. The stock had declined by almost 60% since the start of 2022 and the company's revenue in 2022 had declined by $474 million compared to the previous year.

On November 13, 2023, shares of B. Riley dropped 35% after it disclosed unrealized investment losses and the fact S&P Global Ratings downgraded Franchise Group to junk status, a firm which it acquired in May 2023 as part of an investor consortium for $2.6 billion. B. Riley had lent its founder Brian Kahn $200 million and Kahn was identified as one of two co-conspirators in a securities fraud case related to John Hughes and Prophecy Asset Management. In January 2024, it was reported that the SEC was investigating B. Riley for its connection to the securities fraud case which lead to its stock price declining 10%. At this point B. Riley was one of the most shorted companies in the financial sector.

In March 2024, B. Riley posted a wider quarterly loss and halved its dividends. It also delayed filing its annual report, citing a review of transactions with Kahn. Its shares declined 15% after the announcement. On April 24, 2024, B. Riley filed its annual report after its auditor, Marcum LLP signed it off resulting in shares soaring 61%. In the report the audit cited multiple material weaknesses in the company’s reporting, and some of the previously reported data was revised. It also noted concerns about the fraud case involving Kahn but stated B. Riley had no ties to it after it redid an internal investigation with the help of Winston & Strawn.

In August 2024, Bryant Riley made an unsolicited offer to take the company private at $7.00 per share, a 39% premium to the stock closing price the day the offer was made, though significantly lower than the $17 per share the stock was trading at one week prior. The company also eliminated its dividends, citing the need to prioritize cutting leverage.

On September 9, 2024, B. Riley outlined preliminary plans to sell assets and renegotiate financings in order to bolster its balance sheet. The company confirmed that it is in talks to sell a majority stake in Great American Group and that it has a non-binding commitment for financing of its B. Riley and bebe brands businesses. The two transactions are expected to raise approximately $410 million of gross cash proceeds. These funds would be used to pay down existing debt facilities by the end of 2024.

== Business operations ==
=== Business model ===
As of 2022, B. Riley has six operating segments: capital markets, wealth management, auction and liquidation, financial consulting, communications and brands. Capital markets is the largest segment by revenue followed by communications and wealth management.

As of 2023, Riley is currently the largest shareholder and owns 23% of the company shares.

=== Portfolio companies ===
In May 2016, B. Riley acquired United Online for $170 million.

In November 2017, B. Riley outbid Carnegie Technologies to acquire MagicJack for $143 million.

In November 2019, B. Riley launched a fashion brand portfolio by investing $116.5 million to acquire majority ownership of six fashion brands. These included Catherine Malandrino, Joan Vass, Limited Too and Nanette Lepore.

In May 2023, B. Riley acquired an equity interest in Scotch & Soda.

== Legal issues ==
=== Gary Wunderlich ===
In January 2015, Wunderlich Securities acquired New York brokerage firm Dominick & Dickerman in an all-stock acquisition deal worth $8.3 million. Dominick and its former chairman, Michael Campbell sued Wunderlich Securities and its former owner, Gary Wunderlich alleging fraud and misrepresentation by Wunderlich Securities regarding its financial condition when purchasing the firm. In April 2020, FINRA sided with Dominick and Campbell resulting in Wunderlich Securities being liable to pay nearly $11 million B. Riley had to pay the full amount to settle the dispute.

In June 2020, Wunderlich sued B. Riley to confirm his indemnification in the matter and reimbursement for his legal fees in the arbitration. In June 2023, B. Riley rejected this claim.

In January 2022, B. Riley sued Wunderlich, alleging he unlawfully skirted his liability in April 2020. Wunderlich's lawyer stated B. Riley had agreed to indemnify his client as part of the 2017 purchase.
