= Vladeck =

Vladeck is a surname. Notable people with the surname include:

- Baruch Charney Vladeck (1886–1938), American labor leader and politician
- David Vladeck (born 1951), American civil servant
- Judith Vladeck (1923–2007), American lawyer
- Stephen Vladeck (born (1979), American professor of law

== See also ==
- Vladeck Houses, housing development in Manhattan, New York City, USA
