= David Vladeck =

American lawyer (born 1951)

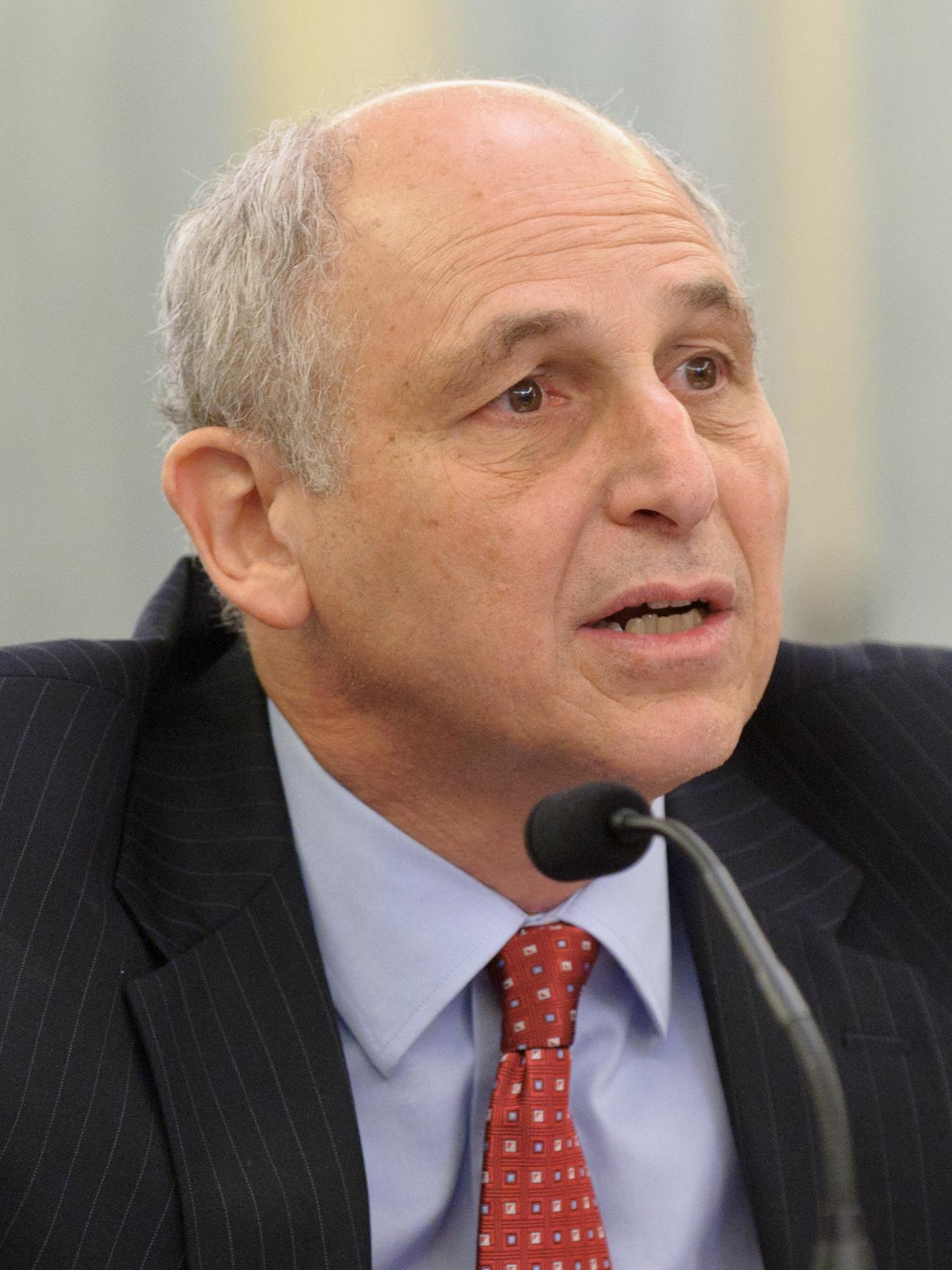
- Vladeck in 2011

Director of the Bureau of Consumer Protection
- In office April 14, 2009 – December 31, 2012
- Preceded by: Lydia Parnes
- Succeeded by: Jessica Rich

Personal details
- Born: June 6, 1951 (age 75) New York City, U.S.
- Relatives: Judith Vladeck (mother); Steve Vladeck (nephew); Baruch Vladeck (grandfather)
- Education: New York University (BA); Columbia University (JD); Georgetown University (LLM)

David C. Vladeck (born June 6, 1951) is an American lawyer and the former director of the Bureau of Consumer Protection of the Federal Trade Commission, an independent agency of the United States government. He was appointed by the chairman of the FTC, Jon Leibowitz, on April 14, 2009, shortly after Leibowitz became chairman. He served in that position until December 31, 2012, when he returned to teaching at the Georgetown University Law Center.

== Early life and education ==
Vladeck is a native of New York City. He comes from a family of lawyers. His father, Stephen Vladeck, founded a worker's rights firm in 1948, which his wife, Judith, joined in 1957. Vladeck's sister, Anne, is a partner at the same firm, while his nephew, Stephen, is a law professor at the Georgetown University Law Center. Vladeck’s brother, Bruce, headed the Health Care Financing Administration, now called the Center for Medicare and Medicaid Services, under President Bill Clinton.

Vladeck received his B.A. from New York University in 1972, and graduated with a J.D. from Columbia Law School in 1976. He received an L.L.M. the from Georgetown Law Center in 1977. While a student at New York University, Vladeck played on the school’s basketball team

== Career ==
Before joining the faculty of the Georgetown University Law Center, Vladeck spent nearly 30 years as a lawyer at the Public Citizen Litigation Group, the litigation arm of Public Citizen, an advocacy organization founded by Ralph Nader. He served as the group’s director for 10 years. While at the Public Citizen Litigation Group, Vladeck argued a number of cases in front of the United States Supreme Court, including cases about the First Amendment, civil rights and labor law. He also argued more than 60 cases in front of federal courts of appeal and state courts of last resort.

Vladeck was a professor at the Georgetown University Law Center for seven years before his appointment to head the Bureau of Consumer Protection. While at Georgetown, he served as the co-director of the Institute for Public Representation, leading the Institute's work in civil rights. He taught courses in federal courts, civil procedure, and government processes and co-directed the Institute for Public Representation, a legal clinic.

== Policy priorities ==
Vladeck’s appointment to head the Bureau of Consumer Protection was lauded by consumer advocates, who felt that the bureau had shown a pro-business bias under commissioners appointed by George W. Bush in areas such as consumer financial services and online privacy. Since taking office, Vladeck has made clear that he intends to make significant changes to the Bureau’s approach in a few key areas.

=== Technology and privacy ===
Since the FTC started to regulate online privacy issues, in the mid-1990s, its focus has been on whether consumers are provided with proper notice about what information may be collected from them and on whether they are given some choice about how it is collected and used. This philosophy was laid out in the fair information practice principles (FIPs)", published in a 1998 FTC report to Congress about online privacy. The Bureau of Consumer Protection has traditionally taken the position that as long as consumers are provided with notice through company privacy policies, collection and use of consumer data is acceptable; and that the bureau should only intervene when a company’s information practices cause concrete, economic harm to consumers.

Vladeck has stated that he doesn’t believe this existing model succeeds in protecting consumers’ privacy online. He has advocated a new framework that is broader than just economic interests, and that doesn’t rely solely on privacy policies to protect consumers online. In a recent interview with the New York Times, Vladeck argued that, "I don’t believe that most consumers either read [privacy policies], or, if they read them, really understand it [sic]. Second of all, consent in the face of these kinds of quote disclosures, I’m not sure that consent really reflects a volitional, knowing act."

Vladeck’s approach to online privacy was seen in his handling of FTC litigation against Sears in In the Matter of Sears Holdings Management Corporation. In June 2009, shortly after Vladeck assumed office, the Bureau of Consumer Protection settled a case against Sears. The company had offered consumers $10 to download software that tracked their internet browsing. The software collected information such as medical prescriptions and financial information. The software contained a privacy policy with detailed disclosures about the type of information to be collected and how it would be used, and consumers suffered no economic harm when they downloaded it. Nevertheless, the FTC sued the company for its practice. Vladeck stated that "under the harm framework, we couldn’t have brought that case," but that because "there’s a huge dignity interest wrapped up in having somebody looking at your financial records when they have no business doing that," the commission was justified in suing.

=== Financial regulation ===
Consumer advocates have criticized the FTC for its lack of active regulation of financial services providers, including companies providing and servicing subprime mortgages in the years before the subprime mortgage crisis. As Mother Jones magazine noted during the Bush Administration, the FTC "brought an average of one subprime lending case a year (in 2004 and 2005 there weren't any), even as the industry was experiencing record growth and complaints mounted about abusive practices leading to home foreclosures."

=== Advertising and marketing ===
In an October 2009 speech to its national advertising division, Vladeck set forth his plan for the Bureau of Consumer Protection's regulation of advertising and marketing practices. He stated that the bureau would have a renewed focus on national advertising, going after large companies that advertise widely and put forth deceptive or unsubstantiated claims, not just small companies perpetrating direct fraud. He also indicated the bureau would particularly focus on food advertising, health claims in advertising and advertising and marketing practices directed at children.

Additionally, since Vladeck took office, the bureau revised its endorsement guides, guidelines to advertisers who use endorsements and testimonials. Previously, the guides – which were last revised in 1980 - only required product testimonials claiming exceptional results to have a disclaimer that said "Results Not Typical". Under the new guidelines, using such testimonials will now require advertisers to "clearly and conspicuously disclose the generally expected results consumers can expect in the depicted circumstances." The guidelines also – somewhat controversially – require bloggers making an endorsement to disclose their "material connections" to the product’s manufacturer or seller.

A positive response to the new rules and laws regarding endorsements and testimonials is an increased level of website compliance standards being adopted that includes the third-party verification of the testimonials businesses present on their websites. These companies, such as testimonialshield.com, collect the data regarding a customer's transaction and experience with a company and with a combined technology and sometimes even personal interviews with the customers to determine the authenticity of the testimonials. Once the testimonials, reviews and/or results are verified, the company can include them in their profiles and add a 'trust mark' similar to that of Verisign, the Better Business Bureau, or Good Housekeeping. The presence of this seal or trust mark helps consumers determine how much weight they should give to the testimonials they are reading before making a decision to support a business.

== Personal life ==
Vladeck is married and has two sons, both of whom pitched for their college baseball teams. One is also a Georgetown Law graduate.
