= Sears Holdings =

Holding company of Sears and Kmart

Sears Holdings Corporation
- Type: Public
- Traded as: OTC Pink: SHLDQ (common stock); OTC Pink: SHLWQ $40mi(warrants); Nasdaq: SHLD
- Industry: Retail
- Genre: Big-box stores; department stores
- Predecessors: Kmart Holding Corporation; Sears, Roebuck and Co.
- Founded: March 24, 2005; 21 years ago
- Fate: Filed for Chapter 11 bankruptcy; assets sold to ESL Investments and moved to new subsidiary Transformco
- Successor: Transformco
- Headquarters: 3333 Beverly Road, Hoffman Estates, Illinois, U.S.
- Number of locations: 766 (Q3 2018)
- Areas served: United States
- Key people: Eddie Lampert (former chairman and CEO); Mohsin Y. Meghji (chief restructuring officer); Office of the CEO: Leena Munjal (chief digital officer); Greg Ladley (president of Apparel and Footwear); Robert A. Riecker (CFO)
- Revenue: ▼US$13.2 billion (FY2019)
- Operating income: ▼US$−1.43 billion (FY2018)
- Net income: ▼US$−1.7 billion (FY2019)
- Total assets: ▼US$6.7 billion (FY2019)
- Total equity: ▼US$−1.72 billion (FY2019)
- Number of employees: 85,000 (2019)
- Subsidiaries: Kmart; Sears; Sears Canada (2005–2018); Kenmore; Craftsman (2005–2017); DieHard; The Great Indoors (2005–2012)
- Website: Archive of website

Sears Holdings Corporation was an American holding company headquartered in Hoffman Estates, Illinois. It was the parent company of the chain stores Kmart and Sears and was founded after the former purchased the latter in 2005. It was the 20th-largest retailing company in the United States in 2015. It filed for Chapter 11 bankruptcy on October 15, 2018, and sold its assets to ESL Investments in 2019. The new owner moved Sears assets to its newly formed subsidiary Transformco.

== History ==
=== 2004–2005: Formation ===
On November 17, 2004, the management of Kmart Holding Corporation announced its intention to purchase Sears, Roebuck and Co. under a new corporation. Kmart previously emerged from Chapter 11 bankruptcy protection on May 6, 2003. The new corporation became known as Sears Holdings Corporation, simply known as Sears Holdings. The new corporation announced that it would continue to operate stores under both the Sears and Kmart brands. The merger of Kmart and Sears closed on March 24, 2005, following affirmative shareholder votes of both companies. With the acquisition, the former HQ of Kmart in Detroit moved to the Sears Headquarters. The result of the merger was Kmart and parent Kmart Holding Corporation and Sears became subsidiaries of the new Sears Holdings Corporation. Sears Holdings now operated Sears and Kmart stores. The company continued to market products under brands held by both companies.

The two companies cited several reasons for combining forces:

- Sears had begun investing in new, larger off-mall stores, called Sears Grand. Earlier in the year, Sears had purchased dozens of current Super Kmart locations; the merger permitted the combined company to accelerate that process.
- Proprietary brands held by both companies could be made more accessible to their target demographics by leveraging their combined real estate holdings. This was estimated to be an expected $200 million a year in revenue synergies.
- At least $300 million a year in cost savings was expected annually, particularly in the supply chain and in administrative overhead.
- The establishment of a shared customer-focused corporate culture between the two companies was estimated to yield improvements in revenue per unit area.
- Preservation of two brands after the merger was intended to allow Sears Holdings to continue focusing on different customer demographics, without alienating either group.

The company is directed by a board of directors composed of members from the two companies: seven members from Kmart's board, and three from Sears. Shareholders in the Kmart Holding Corporation received one share in the new company. Shares of Sears, Roebuck, and Co. stock were converted into a combination of 55 percent stock and 45 percent cash (at $50 a share). Stockholders had a choice of receiving either stock or cash, subject to the predefined ratio.

The merger was completed on March 24, 2005, after receiving regulatory approval from the government and approval by shareholders of both companies.

=== 2005–2009 ===
The exterior of a typical Sears Essentials store

Sears Holdings continued to operate stores under the Sears and Kmart mastheads. In 2005, Sears introduced a new store format called Sears Essentials. As part of this new store format, some Kmart stores were converted to Sears Essentials, as well as a few locations that were acquired from Walmart and several bankrupt discount retailers. The new store format combined the Sears store concept with the Kmart format, which was intended to help the company better compete with Walmart and Target. The project has since been resigned and merged with the Sears Grand concept.

Sears Holdings began cross-selling merchandise between its two brands. For example, Craftsman tools were now available in Kmart stores; they were previously exclusive to the Sears brand. However, Martha Stewart brand paint colors were discontinued at Sears.

Sears Holdings owned 51 percent of Sears Canada, a large department store chain in Canada similar to the U.S. stores. At one point it owned as much as 92% of the Canadian company, but it failed in 2006 to buy the remainder of Sears Canada that it did not own because Bill Ackman took a 17.3 percent stake in it and prevented any takeover. He accepted to sell his stake at $30 a share on April 23, 2010.

Sears Holdings also owns 20 percent of Sears Mexico; Carlos Slim owns the other 80 percent. Like Target stores, Kmart-branded stores in Australia belong to Wesfarmers (which acquired former owners Coles Group in 2007); Wesfarmers also holds the rights to the Kmart brand in New Zealand.

In 2005, Sears Holdings sold a stake in hardware chain Orchard Supply Hardware to private equity firm Ares Management. On December 14, 2011, Sears Holdings announced that it would spin off its remaining holdings in Orchard Supply to shareholders effective December 30, 2011.

In November 2006, speculation rolled around as The Chicago Sun Times reported that Sears may buy Safeway, Home Depot, Gap, BJ's Wholesale Club, Radio Shack, Pep Boys, and Anheuser-Busch. The Washington Post, in a March 11, 2007, article, described the current Sears as a hedge fund with money being diverted from the maintenance and improvement of stores to non-retail financial investments. A former executive was quoted as saying the company faced an "uncertain future". Surprisingly, a third of pre-tax income in the third quarter of 2006, according to The Washington Post, was due to financial trades and not the retail business. However, these investments performed poorly in the fourth quarter.

In 2007, the company placed its three major brands in KCD IP, a "separate, wholly-owned, bankruptcy-remote subsidiary". KCD stands for the three brands: Kenmore, Craftsman, and DieHard. KCD IP then issued $1.8 billion in bonds that were sold to Sears' insurance subsidiary based in Bermuda. Sears would thus pay KCD for use of the three brands' trademarks.

On December 14, 2007, the company submitted a draft merger agreement to buy Restoration Hardware for $6.75 a share. Sears already owned 13.7 percent of the company. That offer was withdrawn after Restoration's shares tumbled and a competing bid from private equity firm Catterton Partners was lowered to $4.50 per share. On February 28, Sears Holdings made an offer of $4.55 a share.

In June 2008, Sears launched Servicelive.com, which was intended to connect Sears customers with local contractors for home improvement projects. The site charges 10 percent of the contract price for each completed service and offers more than 40,000 contractors. Servicelive.com was redesigned in March 2010. In 2010, Dennis Stemmle was appointed president of the division.

=== 2010–2014 ===
On February 22, 2010, the Sears Automotive business launched a new Independent Sears Auto Center franchise program that offers automobile dealers the opportunity to operate licensed Sears Auto Centers, with the first dealership in New Jersey. The company has faced consistent quarters of decline since the merger of Sears, Roebuck and Co. and Kmart Corp in 2005, the first year of results for the merged company. Income plunged 84 percent from $858 million, or $6.17 per diluted share from 2005 to 2011. Eddie Lampert has held the title of chairman of Sears Holdings over the period of decline. The first quarter of 2011 did not appear any better, with the company posting a net loss of $170 million, or $1.58 a share. Some industry analysts feel the heart of the problem is Eddie Lampert's "penny-pinching" cost-savings by stifling investment into stores. Instead, the company has been buying back stock and increasing its presence online.

The company closed a number of stores between 2011 and 2013. On December 27, 2011, after poor holiday sales, the company announced 100 to 120 Sears and Kmart stores would close. On February 23, 2012, Sears Holdings Corp. announced it is closing all nine "The Great Indoors" stores. On December 6, 2013, Sears Holding Corp. announced that it will spin off Lands' End catalog business as a separate company by distributing stock to the retailer's stockholders. Lands' End stock began trading on the NASDAQ on April 7, 2014.

=== 2015–2017 ===
In 2015, Sears Holdings planned to spin off 235 of its properties into a new REIT to be called Seritage Growth Properties, with the package of properties backed by a $925 million loan from JP Morgan Chase Bank. The 235 properties, mainly Sears and Kmart locations, spread across the country and Puerto Rico, amounted to a total of 37.1 million square feet of space. The strategy of department stores converting their real estate holdings into REITs has been well-used in the current commercial real estate environment.

Not everyone was happy with the Seritage move. Some people felt that the property sold were undervalued. The fact that Eddie Lampert was involved in both ends of the deal, made the move very suspect. Investors filed a lawsuit against the move. Lampert settled this deal agreeing to $40 million.

In May 2016, Sears Holdings announced that it was seeking strategic alternatives for its house brands to increase their revenue, including expanding their presence outside of Sears and Kmart. The filing stated that "by evaluating potential partnerships or other transactions that could expand distribution of our brands and service offerings, we can position both businesses to achieve greater success." Sears opened standalone appliance stores.

In late 2016 and early 2017, some significant steps were taken by Edward Lampert, president, chief executive officer and top shareholder of Sears Holding Corp. Lampert, with personal assets estimated at $2 billion, is also the founder and manager of the hedge fund ESL Investments Inc. He provided an additional loan of $500 million to the company and said he would provide letters of credit to Sears for additional amounts, reportedly totaling $200 million and possibly increasing to a half-billion dollars in the future. During this period, the company announced that it would close 150 stores (109 Kmart and 41 Sears outlets), in an attempt to cut its losses after a decline in sales of 12 to 13 percent during the holiday shopping season and the largest quarterly loss since 2013. On January 9, 2017, Sears announced that it had reached an agreement to sell the Craftsman brand to Stanley Black & Decker for $900 million, plus royalties on new Craftsman sales for a 15-year period. During this period, Sears will continue selling Craftsman products royalty-free under a licensing agreement.

As part of an effort to extend the brand, Sears launched a pilot location in San Antonio for a DieHard-branded auto service franchise, DieHard Auto Center driven by Sears Auto. The brand is intended to operate as a standalone version of the Sears Auto Center locations attached to Sears department stores; the location was chosen because it was in proximity to a Sears location that had closed. In December 2017, the Wall Street Journal reported that Sears Holdings Corp. had not paid for any national television commercials since late November 2017, for both Kmart and Sears, instead relying on online marketing.

On January 4, 2018, Sears Holdings announced it would shutter 103 unprofitable Kmart and Sears stores, after 24 quarters of sales declines. These stores would be closing by April 2018, leaving Sears Holdings with 555 stores. According to an op-ed in MSN money, at this rate, Sears, along with sister company Kmart, has an extremely high chance of disappearing and going defunct in 2018, and that 2017 will have marked its final holiday season as an independent brand.

On January 14, 2018, their Canadian unit, Sears Canada, ceased operations with all stores closed.

On March 15, 2018, Sears Holdings announced a small profit was made in quarter 4 of 2017. However, investors are claiming that this is due to tax refunds and that sales are still falling for both Kmart and Sears.

On September 11, 2018, the company stated it would announce its quarter 2 earnings when the market opened on September 13. After missing the deadline, the company announced at the end of the business day that it had lost $508 million, though same-store sales showed some improvements. The following day, Lampert blamed the losses on the company's difficulties in paying pensions and the resulting regulatory penalties.

On September 28, 2018, Sears Holdings began selling at less than a dollar per share, risking delisting by NASDAQ.

=== 2018 bankruptcy ===
On October 10, 2018, it was reported that Sears Holdings had engaged advisors regarding an imminent bankruptcy filing.

The company filed for Chapter 11 bankruptcy protection on October 15, 2018, in New York; the same day that a $134 million debt payment was due, and will close 142 stores, including 63 Kmart stores and 79 Sears stores.

All other Kmart and Sears stores are staying open to turn the company around. Their online stores sears.com, kmart.com, and shopyourway.com are also staying open to serve members affected by the store closures. On the same day, Lampert announced that he was stepping down as CEO, remaining chairman of the board. He also announced that CFO Robert A. Riecker, CDO Leena Munjal, and apparel and footwear segment president Greg Ladley would collectively share the responsibilities of CEO in his place.

After hitting below $1 per share due to bankruptcy filing, Sears Holdings was delisted from NASDAQ on October 24, 2018 and became listed on OTC Pink.

On November 8, 2018, Sears Holdings announced it would close an additional 40 Kmart and Sears stores.

On November 23, 2018, Sears Holdings released a list of 505 stores, including 239 Kmart stores and 266 Sears stores, that are for sale in the bankruptcy process while all others are currently holding liquidation sales.

On December 28, 2018, Sears Holdings announced that it would close an additional 80 Kmart and Sears stores, as it faces possible liquidation. Their deadline for a bid was December 28, 2018 at 4:00pm; if no offers are made for the company, it could face liquidation of the entire operation. During the last few minutes of the auction, Lampert sent a $4.6 billion bid to try to keep the dying company alive. He plans to keep 425 locations open, including 202 Kmart stores and 223 Sears stores, with 50,000 employees.

Sears Holdings announced on January 16, 2019, that Lampert (through his hedge fund, ESL Investments) had won the bankruptcy auction, allowing the company to remain open.

On January 24, 2019, a group of unsecured creditors, that included Simon Property Group, filed a motion with the bankruptcy court to overturn the deal Sears Holdings had just made with Lampert claiming that Lampert had been "engaged in serial asset stripping" of the company at the expense of suppliers and landlords. The creditors want the bankruptcy court to force the company to liquidate instead.

On January 28, 2019, the federal government operated Pension Benefit Guaranty Corporation announced that they were not in favor with the current Sears Holding agreement with Lampert since that agreement would create a $1.7 billion funding gap in the employee pension fund that would require the American taxpayers to cover the shortfall. The same federal agency also accused "Lampert of structuring the deal to inappropriately obtain ownership of the chain's Kenmore appliance brand and the Diehard tools brand."

On February 7, 2019, a bankruptcy judge approved a $5.2 billion plan by Sears' chairman and biggest shareholder to keep the iconic business going. The approval means roughly 425 stores and 45,000 jobs will be preserved. As a result, the retail business has emerged into Transform Holdco LLC.

On May 24, 2019, Sears announced it was opening small stores under the name Sears Home&Life. These stores would mainly sell appliances, mattresses, connected home products. This was done at three locations: Overland Park, Kansas, Anchorage, Alaska, and in Lafayette, Louisiana.

On June 28, 2019, it was reported that Sears Holdings had plans to fully dissolve after selling its retail assets to ESL Investments a few months prior.

In March 2019, Sears Holdings sued Transform Holdco LLC for $57.5 million it said it was owed from the sale. The company also said Transform owed it $41.3 million for credit card and cash transactions that occurred before the sale closed, as well as $16.2 million for a portion of February rent, according to the documents. Sears Holdings could not be reached for additional comment. The lawsuit was settled in January 2020. The Chapter 11 proceedings (Case No. 18-23538) were overseen by Judge Robert D. Drain in the Southern District of New York, with Weil, Gotshal & Manges LLP serving as lead debtor's counsel under partner Jacqueline Marcus. The Official Committee of Unsecured Creditors was represented by Akin Gump Strauss Hauer & Feld LLP, with Ira S. Dizengoff and Philip C. Dublin as lead attorneys. Following confirmation of the liquidation plan, the Sears Liquidating Trust pursued thousands of preference and fraudulent transfer actions against former vendors and creditors nationwide, engaging a range of firms including Weil Gotshal, Morgan, Lewis & Bockius LLP, and the Law Office of Mark S. Roher, P.A. to manage recovery litigation across multiple jurisdictions.

On October 29, 2022, Sears Holdings emerged from bankruptcy.

== Finances ==
Year	Revenue in mil. US$	Net income in mil. US$	Total assets in mil. US$	Employees	Stores
2006	49,455	857	30,467	355,000	3,843
2007	53,016	1,492	29,906	352,000	3,791
2008	49,867	812	27,497	337,000	3,791
2009	46,007	295	25,444	324,000	3,862
2010	43,360	218	24,901	322,000	3,862
2011	42,664	122	24,360	312,000	3,949
2012	41,567	−3,113	21,381	293,000	4,010
2013	39,854	−930	19,340	274,000	2,548
2014	36,188	−1,365	18,261	249,000	2,429
2015	31,198	−1,682	13,209	196,000	1,725
2016	25,146	−1,129	11,337	178,000	1,672
2017	22,138	−2,221	9,362	140,000	1,430
2018	16,702	−383	7,262	89,000	1,002

== Former subsidiaries ==
- Kmart division
  - Kmart – a chain of discount stores that are usually free-standing or located in strip malls. They carry most standard department store stock as well as a limited selection of grocery items.
  - Big Kmart – a sub-chain of Kmart that uses a hypermarket model, carrying an expanded inventory. Big Kmart stores range from 84,000 to 120,000 sq ft (7,800 to 11,100 m^{2}). Since the merger with Sears, many stores have been rebranded simply to Kmart.
  - K-Fresh – a new format that was implemented in several Super Kmart locations, which extended the grocery section into a store-within-a-store model.
  - mygofer – a hybrid-online retail concept launched in spring of 2009, where products are ordered ahead of time and then are either shipped to the customer or held at a local Kmart for the customer to pick up.

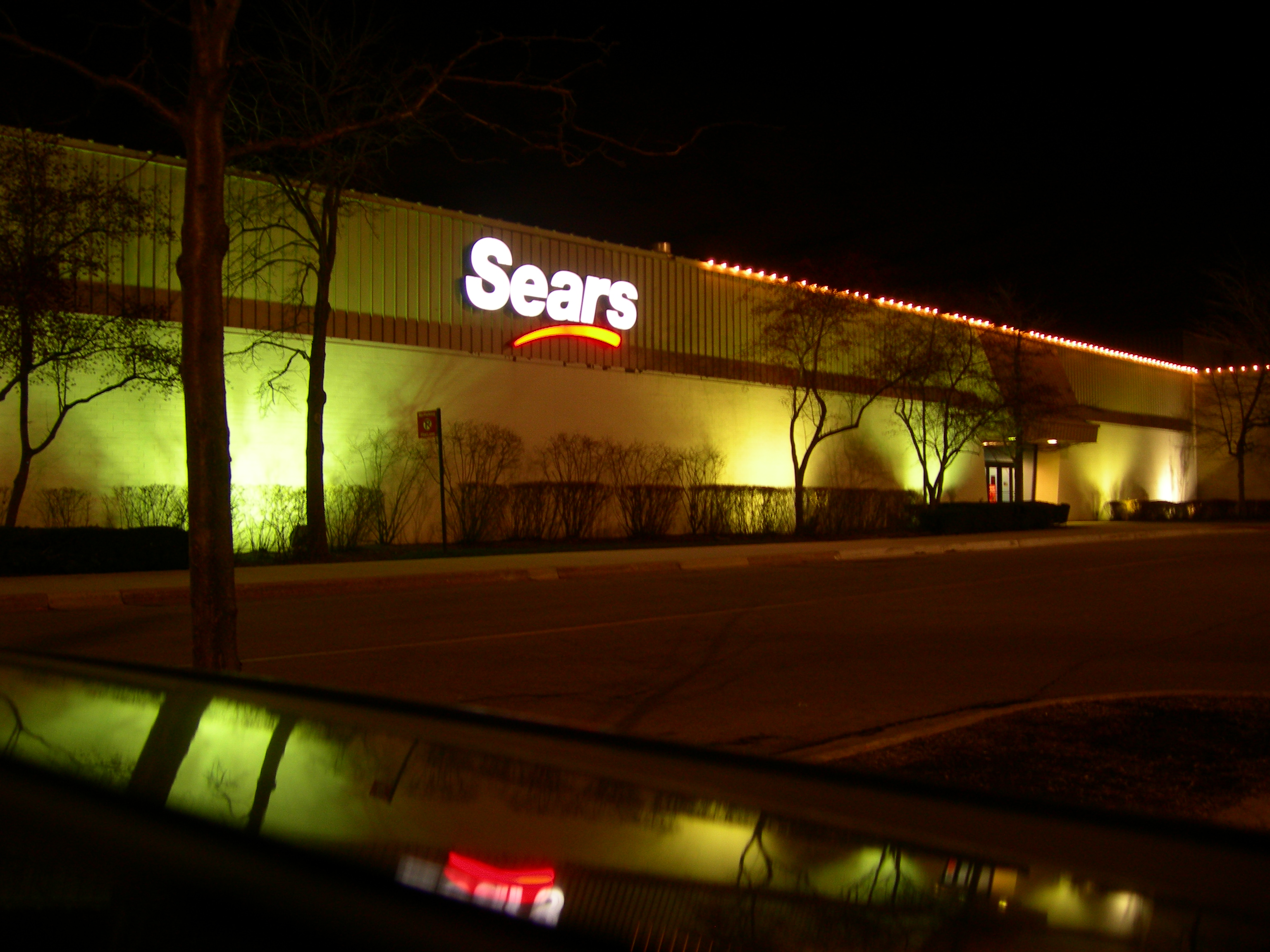
An older Sears exterior with newer signage at Hawthorn Mall in 2006. This location closed in September 2018.

- Sears division
  - Sears – a chain of department stores that are usually located in shopping malls. with a few freestanding locations. These stores carry traditional, middle-class priced department store items as well as an expanded appliance and tools section.
  - Sears Grand – a sub-chain of hypermarkets typically located away from shopping malls. Many Sears Grand locations are retrofit remodels of existing Kmart or Sears stores with a few freestanding locations. They carry an expanded inventory, and can range from 165,000 to 210,000 square feet (15,300 to 19,500 m^{2}).
  - Sears Home Services – a division of Sears that specializes in appliance repair, lawn and garden services, HVAC service, as well as most in-home services. Sears Home Services can also do a repair on small appliances in-store.
  - Sears PartsDirect – a chain of lawn-and-garden equipment and appliances parts stores. Some stores, branded as Sears Parts and Repair Centers, feature a carry-in point for customers to bring merchandise in that needs to be repaired either in- or out-of-warranty.
  - Sears Vacations – online travel and booking agency owned in partnership with International Cruise & Excursions, Inc.
  - Sears Canada – held 10% stake from 2014 to 2018.
- Other subsidiaries
  - DieHard Auto Center – launched in 2017, these full-service auto care centers are similar to Sears Auto Centers although they are not attached to Sears stores. Specialize in DieHard-branded auto products.
  - Shop Your Way – a customer loyalty program shared between all subsidiaries.
  - A&E Factory Service – a joint venture held by Whirlpool and Sears Holdings that performs mobile appliance repairs.
  - Wally Labs – a subsidiary created when Sears Holdings purchased the rights to WallyHome sensor technology from SNUPI Technologies in 2015. The company provides technology for home safety, security, and loss prevention.
  - Monark Premium Appliances – Premium appliance showrooms for architects, builders, designers, developers, and homeowners to browse.
  - Innovel Solutions – formerly known as Sears logistics, acts as the supply chain arm for Sears Holding Company and served clients like the Air Force Exchange, the Navy Exchange, and former Sears brand Lands' End. The company specializes in storing and moving items of all sizes, including furniture, large appliances, and even entire wine cellars. Providing final mile' delivery, complete installation and white glove capabilities for 'big and bulky' products across the United States and Puerto Rico.
- Sears Hometown and Outlet Stores – a subsidiary of Sears that operated a series of more specialized department stores. In 2012, these stores were spun off into an independent company.
  - Sears Hometown (formerly Sears Dealer Store) – a chain of smaller, free-standing stores located in smaller markets that did not support full-sized Sears stores. These locations primarily concentrated on hardware, appliances, and lawn-and-garden supplies.
  - Sears Outlet – an outlet version of Sears department stores located in various retail locations across the U.S. and Canada. These stores carried new, one-of-a-kind, out of a carton, discontinued, used, scratched, and dented merchandise at discount.
  - Sears Appliance & Hardware/ Sears Appliance Outlet – a chain of free-standing hardware stores.
  - Sears Home Appliance Showrooms – a subchain of sears that focused on home appliances and related services.
  - Sears Fashion Outlet – a fashion-only version of Sears Outlet.
- Lands' End – a line of business-casual clothing, sold both at Sears in a store-within-a-store model as well as in standalone stores.
- Defunct Subsidiaries
  - Kmart Super Center – the predecessor to Big Kmart, with a similar model. The last Super Kmart was located in Warren, Ohio, and closed on April 8, 2018.
  - Sears Essentials – the predecessor to Sears Grand, with a similar model. The concept was discontinued in 2006 but stores retained the Sears Essentials name until 2012.
  - Sears Optical – a chain of eyewear stores typically located in strip malls beginning in 1994. Sears Optical ceased operations in 2020.
  - Orchard Supply Hardware – a chain of free-standing hardware stores, which averaged 28,000 square feet. Stores carried home repair, hardware products, and lawn and garden supplies, found primarily in California. It was owned by Sears from 1996 to 2012 and was later absorbed into Lowe's. Orchard Supply Hardware ceased operations in November 2018.
  - The Great Indoors – a chain of free-standing home-décor stores that carry high-end appliances, bedding, and kitchen-and-bath fixtures. This chain was closed in 2012.

== See also ==
- Sears
- Kmart
- Kmart Australia – an independent Australian chain formerly affiliated with Kmart
- Sears Canada – defunct Canadian unit
- Sears "Design the 1988 Wish Book Cover" Contest
- Sears (Mexico)
- In the Matter of Sears Holdings Management Corporation
