= Chitika =

American advertising company

Chitika, Inc.
- Company type: Private
- Industry: Internet advertising
- Founded: Shrewsbury, Massachusetts (May 2003)
- Headquarters: Westborough, Massachusetts, US
- Key people: Venkat Kolluri, Co-Founder, CEO; Alden DoRosario, Co-Founder, CTO
- Products: Search Targeted Text Ads, Mobile Ads
- Website: chitika.com

Chitika, Inc. (pronounced CHIH-tih-ka) was a search-targeted advertising company. It was located in Westborough, Massachusetts, United States. The name Chitika means "in a snap" in Telugu language.

On April 17, 2019, Chitika announced that they were shutting down their business.

== History ==
In 2003, co-founders Venkat Kolluri and Alden DoRosario started Chitika after leaving their jobs at search engine-based company Lycos. Since launching its online advertising service in 2004, Chitika has added a Mobile advertising Division as well as a Real-Time Bidding Division. In 2015, Chitika's founders announced Cidewalk, their local mobile ad platform, would spin off into a separate business unit with $4 Million in seed funding and new office space in Southborough, MA.

On April 17, 2019, Chitika wrote to publishers advising them of their immediate cessation of business. The email advised publishers to remove all Chitika code from their website. The email further advised publishers that they would not be paid for impressions or clicks occurring since March 1, 2019.

== Partnerships ==
In 2009, Chitika began a partnership with the b5media Network.

In 2010, Yahoo! closed their AdSense competitor Yahoo Publisher Network Online (YPNO) and recommended publishers migrate to Chitika as a replacement.

In 2013, Chitika announced a multi-year extension of its partnership with Yahoo!. The agreement includes off–network search syndication, monetization of Yahoo! owned and operated properties, and mobile ad serving and monetization.

== Controversies ==
In December 2005, some publishers reported a reduction in revenue after auditing between 25%-90%.

In 2010, Chitika removed their ads from thousands of websites. The company stated that the sites they had been doing business with were all suddenly placed under "Pending Review" or "Pending Further Review" status. This meant the company would no longer show ads on the sites. Many dropped the advertising service.

On March 16, 2011, the Federal Trade Commission (FTC) appeared before the United States Senate Commerce Committee and announced its first behavioral advertising case, filed against Chitika for use of a deceptive opt-out mechanism. According to the FTC, Chitika's cookies that opt users out of behavioral tracking were expiring in ten days rather than the stated ten years. A settlement was reached under which Chitika was forbidden from making misleading statements about the extent of data collection about consumers and the extent to which consumers can control the use of their data. Further, the settlement required that Chitika link all its advertising to an effective opt-out mechanism in future. It has been commented that, “this requirement of a hyperlink embedded in online advertisements is a good indicator of the type of Do Not Track mechanism that will be acceptable to the FTC if “Do Not Track” becomes mandatory.” According to a press release by the company, their opt-out cookies have been set to ten days since March 2010 when the FTC began their investigation. Chitika subsequently claimed to have made only a total of fifty-five cents from the ten-day opt-out expiration.

== Delaying and denying payments ==
In 2017, Chitika shocked its publishers by changing the minimum payout from $10 to $50. It affected many existing publishers who joined Chitika for its lower payout option. Publishers who cross $50 are banned from the network.

On April 17, 2019, Chitika wrote to publishers advising them of their immediate cessation of business. The email advised publishers to remove all Chitika code from their website. The email further advised publishers that they would not be paid for impressions or clicks occurring since March 1, 2019.
