= Sears Wish Book =

Series of Christmas mail order catalogs

The Sears Wish Book was a popular Christmas-themed catalog released annually by the American department store chain Sears in August or September. The catalog contained toys and other holiday-related merchandise. The first Sears Wish Book was published in 1933 and was a separate catalog from the annual Sears Christmas catalog.

== Sears, Roebuck & Co. ==
The Sears catalog called the "Big Book" or the "Wish Book" offered customers around the US a chance to wear "city clothes" throughout its 97-year-history. The book sold everything from jewelry to cars to tools to farm equipment to pianos to whole homes.

With the huge volume of catalogs, Sears contracted the printing out to Cuneo Press until 1928 when they switched to RR Donnelley. RR Donnelley built the building at 3301 W Arthington St. to print the biannual catalogs. Donnelly printed them at this site until Sears discontinued their catalog. The facility printed up to 7 million copies of their catalogs each year.

In 1993, Sears discontinued publishing their big-book catalogs in the United States and the Wish Book noticeably started to diminish in size. By 2005, Sears had completely abandoned anything resembling the original Wish Book and was producing the 2.5-by-2.5-inch Little Big Wish Book. The mini-catalog was given to customers at Sears Auto Centers, placed inside packages that were purchased on Sears.com and Landsend.com, and was included inside the packaging of in-home deliveries.

In 2007, Sears once again created a holiday gift catalog more reminiscent of its predecessor, however, it was still considerably smaller than the original Wish Book at only about 100 pages. This was a stark contrast to the 300-plus page catalog previously produced. According to the Associated Press at that time, the Sears Wish Book was considered as a holiday treat in itself by generations of children who were hoping for the best on Christmas morning.

In the 2007 edition of the catalog, half of the total number of pages was devoted to Christmas toys and the remainder focused on other store items including appliances, tools, clothes and jewelry.

In the 2010 edition, Sears Christmas Wish Book went mobile so customers would be able to access their catalog via smartphone devices.

Sears Holdings, the owner of Sears and Kmart, announced that they would be bringing back the Sears Wish Book in 2017 both online, mobile, and print editions. This edition is only 120 pages and closely resembles the Wish Books from 2007.

== Sears Canada ==
Sears Canada distributed big-book catalogues, including the Wish Book, until the company's dissolution in 2018. In 2012, Sears Canada chief Calvin McDonald hand-delivered Christmas catalogs to mark the 60th Anniversary of the Sears Wish Book.

Sears Canada launched an iPad app for the 2013 Christmas Wish Book which was at the time ranked as the number one free iPad app in Canada in the Catalogue category.
