= Funeral Rule =

US federal regulation

The Funeral Rule, enacted by the Federal Trade Commission on April 30, 1984, and amended effective 1994, is a U.S. federal regulation designed to protect consumers by requiring that they receive adequate information concerning the goods and services they may purchase from a funeral provider.

All U.S. funeral providers must comply with The Funeral Rule. The Funeral Rule defines such terms as, among others, funeral provider, funeral goods and funeral services and specifies various consumer rights, as well as specific parameters in which funeral industry goods and service providers must respect consumer rights and conduct their business.

== Overview ==
The Funeral Rule defines and provides parameters in the following key subject areas:

- Definition of a General Price List, or GPL
- Specific disclosures must be provided in writing to the consumer regarding embalming, alternative containers for direct cremation, the basic service fee, the Casket Price List and the Outer Burial Container Price List
- Specific misrepresentations in six areas: embalming, casket for direct cremation, outer burial container, legal and cemetery requirements, preservative and protective vault claims, cash advance items and other misrepresentations

- The GPL must contain a written acknowledgement that consumers have the right to choose the funeral goods and services desired, with some exceptions

- Disclosure and reference to any state or local laws that require a consumer to purchase any particular item
- A funeral home may not refuse or charge a fee to handle a casket that is purchased from a third-party provider
- A funeral home that also offers cremation must offer an inexpensive, unfinished wood box or alternative container with a non-metal enclosure that is cremated with the body
- Written disclosure must be made of the consumer's right to purchase an unfinished wood box or alternative container for direct cremation
- A funeral home may not claim that state or local law require a casket for direct cremation
- A written description and price list of all caskets must be provided before viewing any caskets for sale
- A written acknowledgement provided to the consumer stating that consumers do not have to purchase a package funeral arrangement
- Written details, including associated expenses, regarding viewing or visitation of the deceased
- Written details, including associated expenses, of a formal funeral service
- Written details, including associated expenses, regarding transportation to the cemetery
- A funeral home must provide a written GPL to all persons who inquire in person about funeral arrangements, regardless of whether they are a consumer looking to purchase funeral goods and services from the funeral home now or in the future
- The GPL must be provided for the inquiring individual or group to keep
- The GPL must be offered when any discussion begins regarding funeral arrangements, goods or services or the prices of such, regardless of the location of the discussion
- The GPL does not have to be physically mailed in response to telephone or mail inquiries, although accurate information must be provided to a telephone inquiry
- A fee cannot be charged for providing a GPL in response to a telephone or mail inquiry

== Types of funerals ==
The Funeral Rule defines clearly several funeral types to minimize the chance of miscommunication or misunderstanding between the funeral service provider and customer.

"Traditional", full-service funeral

The Funeral Rule describes a traditional, full-service funeral as including a viewing or visitation of the deceased, usually held in the funeral home, a formal funeral service, transportation of the deceased to the cemetery (hearse), the burial, entombment or cremation in addition to the funeral director's basic service fee.

Extra costs not included in the aforementioned arrangements include embalming and the dressing of the body, the funeral home's basic service fee, funeral home rental for the viewing or service, use of vehicles (limousine) to transport the family or pallbearers, the casket or urn, the cemetery plot or crypt, flowers, obituary notice, and others.

Immediate burial

The Funeral Rule describes immediate burial as a burial that occurs shortly after death with no viewing or visitation and is usually in a simple container or casket. There is generally no viewing or visitation, so embalming is not necessary or required. A memorial service is generally held at the burial site, or at a later date.

Costs associated with this choice include the funeral director's basic service fee, transportation and care of the body, the casket or burial container and the cemetery plot or crypt. If the family selects a burial site service, extra charges will be added.

Direct cremation

The Funeral Rule described direct cremation as cremation that occurs shortly after death with no viewing or visitation and embalming is not necessary or required. A memorial may be held with or without the remains. The remains may be kept in the home, buried, placed in a crypt or niche or scattered in a favorite spot.

Costs associated with direct cremation include the funeral director's basic service fee, transportation and care of the body, a crematory fee may be included if the funeral home provides crematory services, the cost of an urn or other container and the cemetery plot or crypt if the remains are buried or entombed. If the funeral home does not provide crematory services, a third-party crematory service fee will also be added on. The Funeral Rule establishes that all funeral homes that offer cremation must offer consumers containers other than caskets.

== Viewing or visitation ==
U.S. persons, under The Funeral Rule, are not required to use a funeral home to conduct the viewing or visitation or funeral, however, there are many details and legal requirements, so it is a commonly accepted practice to use one. Funeral transfer service providers remedy the need for a funeral home while at the same time removing the obstacles that inhibit a lay person from performing the basic requirements of transportation, storage and documents preparation.

== Basic service fee ==
The Funeral Rule allows for funeral homes to charge a basic service fee. Consumers who select to work with a particular funeral home cannot decline to pay this fee, which includes fees for services common to all funerals, such as: - Planning and arranging the actual funeral, such as determining the viewing or visitation dates and times - Securing the applicable permits and copies of the death certificate - Preparation of obituary notices. If an extra service charge is applied, this must be disclosed in writing - Sheltering of the remains - Coordinating arrangements with the cemetery, crematory or other third-party - The basic service fee does not include optional services or goods

== Optional goods or services ==
The Funeral Rule defines optional goods or services as everything outside of what is specifically delineated as being included in the basic service fee, including cash advance items. Some examples of optional goods or services include: - Transportation of the remains - embalming or other preparation - Use of the funeral home and staff for viewing or visitation - The funeral or memorial ceremony - Use of the hearse for transportation to the cemetery - Limousine for family or pallbearers - casket or urn - Outer burial container, if required by the cemetery Alternate burial container - cremation or inurnment

A cash advance is used for any goods or services that the funeral home purchases from a third-party vendor on behalf of their customer. Some examples of cash advance items include: - Flowers - obituary notice - Pallbearers - Officiating clergy - Organist or soloist

The Funeral Rule stresses the importance of the consumer to clarify with the funeral home whether there is a premium charged for cash advance items. Some funeral homes pass through the exact expense to their customers, while others apply a mark-up, which is allowable under The Funeral Rule. According to The Funeral Rule, funeral homes that charge a mark-up must disclose this in writing to their customers, but the amount or percentage of the mark-up need not be disclosed. The Funeral Rule also establishes that funeral homes must disclose whether any refunds, rebates or discounts apply to any cash advance item.

== Itemized statement ==
The Funeral Rule directs that the funeral home must provide the customer with a written itemized statement, including the total cost. However, The Funeral Rule does not establish format guidelines for the itemized statement and it may be included on any document given to the customer at the end of the discussion about funeral arrangements. The Funeral Rule stresses the importance of understanding what goods and services are included in the basis service fee and what is being itemized as optional and charged for separately. The itemized statement must include the charges for cash advance goods and services. If the funeral home is unsure of the exact amount of cash advance items, a written "good faith estimate" must be provided in writing. The itemized statement must also disclose any legal, crematory or cemetery requirements on any goods or service purchased.

== Embalming ==
Many funeral homes require embalming if a viewing or visitation is planned, however, there is no federal or state law that dictates that embalming is required and a funeral home is prohibited from stating that any such law exists.

The Funeral Rule established the following embalming guidelines: - Embalming cannot be done without specific permission from the customer - Funeral homes may not claim that embalming is a legal requirement, except in certain special circumstances, and provide written disclosure of such - Customers may not be charged for embalming without their permission unless it was required by state law in certain special circumstances - The customer must receive written disclosure stating that individuals usually have the right to choose a disposition that does not require embalming, such as direct cremation or immediate burial, which do not require embalming - Written disclosure must be made if a funeral arrangement, such a viewing or visitation, may require embalming as a practical necessity and therefore, a required purchase

== Caskets ==
Caskets are typically metal, wood, fiberglass, fiberboard or plastic. The Funeral Rule states that customers must be provided a written description of each casket offered and the associated Casket Price List before viewing of any physical caskets. The Funeral Rule also mandates that a funeral home must accept any third-party purchased casket for the funeral and may not charge any fees for acceptance.

Some caskets include features such as “gasketed”, “protective” or includes a “sealer”. These terms generally mean the casket has a rubber gasket or other feature designed to delay water seepage and prevent rust. According to The Funeral Rule, these features may delay the decomposition of the remains, but they will not prevent it forever. Some caskets come with warranties, but the warranty is for the durability of the casket, not for protection from eventual decomposition of the remains. Under The Funeral Rule, no person selling any casket may claim that caskets with these features will prevent decomposition of the remains forever, because that is not possible.

== Cremation ==
According to The Funeral Rule, funeral homes and any crematory must comply with the following: - An inexpensive, unfinished wood or alternative container, with a non-metal enclosure that is cremated with the body must be made available. These are generally made of press board, cardboard or canvas. - It may not be stated that state or local laws require the purchase of a casket for direct cremation. - Written disclosure must be provided to the customers on their right to buy an unfinished wood box or alternative container for direct cremation. - An unfinished wood box or alternative container must be made available.

If a viewing or visitation is requested prior to cremation, many funeral homes have caskets for rent in lieu of purchasing a casket.

== Outer burial container ==
Outer burial containers are not required by law but are required by many cemeteries. The outer burial container surrounds the casket in the grave to protect it from sinking into the ground.

There are two types of outer burial containers, a grave liner and a burial vault. A grave liner is generally made from reinforced concrete that satisfies any cemetery requirement and covers the top and sides of the casket. A burial vault is more substantial and expensive and surrounds the entire casket in concrete or other material.

The Funeral Rule dictates that the customer must be given a written description and Outer Burial Container Price List prior to viewing any physical items and that the funeral home cannot claim either in writing or verbally that any process or product will preserve the remains indefinitely.

== Cemetery sites ==
When selecting a cemetery site, The Funeral Rule advises consumers to considering the following: - Location of the cemetery and burial plot - Religious requirements or affiliations - Restrictions or charges associated with the outer burial container if purchased from a third-party - Types of grave markers or monuments allowed by the cemetery - Whether flowers or other remembrances may be placed on the grave - Burial plot price - Outer burial container requirements - Charges for opening the grave - Charges for closing the grave - Perpetual charges for maintenance and grounds keeping, which are sometimes included, but not always - If perpetual charges are not included, clarify the separate endowment care fee for maintenance and grounds keeping - If cremated remains are housed at a cemetery, clarify mausoleum or columbarium fees - Opening mausoleum or columbarium fees - Closing mausoleum or columbarium fees - Perpetual endowment charges for maintenance or other services of the mausoleum or columbarium

The Funeral Rule does not apply to cemeteries and mausoleums unless they offer both funeral goods and services.

== U.S. veteran cemeteries ==
In the U.S., all veterans are entitled to a free burial in a national cemetery and a grave marker. This benefit is also extended to some civilians who provided military related services and some Public Health service providers. Additionally, this benefit includes the veteran's spouse and dependent children who also may receive a free burial in a national cemetery and a grave marker. Cemeteries are prohibited from charging the family for opening or closing fees, charging for an outer burial container or the grave marker setting in a national cemetery, however, families are responsible for the remaining expenses.

Many states have established state veteran cemeteries, but this varies state by state and the specific state should be contacted for more information.

The Funeral Rule advises that consumers should be cautious when considering commercial cemeteries offering “veterans specials”. The Funeral Rule advises that the savings offered are usually recaptured through charging inflated fees for an adjoining spouse plot and/or high opening and closing fees.

== Pre-need contracts ==
With the exception of a cemetery plot if you are certain of where you want to be buried or entombed, the Federal Trade Commission does not advocate purchasing pre-need contracts. The Funeral Rule states that all guidelines and rules set forth must be complied with at the time pre-need funeral arrangements are discussed, at the time of contract purchase and at the time of the actual funeral. The Funeral Rule does not cover the language and parameters of the actual pre-need contract, nor does The Funeral Rule set forth guidelines on things such as payment options, costs or ability to modify, transfer or cancel the contract, or administrative fees. If the survivors of the deceased pre-need contract holder inquire about funeral goods or services, alter the pre-need funeral arrangements or are required to pay additional sums of money, all relevant price lists and disclosures must be provided in writing, either printed or typewritten, by the funeral home in a format for them to keep. The survivors must also be provided, in writing, an itemized statement and final cost.

Individuals or organizations selling pre-need contracts on behalf of, or acting as an agent of, one or more funeral homes, but who themselves do not sell funeral goods or services, must comply with The Funeral Rule.

The Funeral Rule does not apply to pre-need funeral arrangements or pre-need contracts purchased before The Funeral Rule went into effect in 1984. However, if a pre-need contract purchased before 1984 is modified after 1984, the modification triggers all of The Funeral Rule's requirements.

Since the actual pre-need contract purchased is not subject to The Funeral Rule, the Federal Trade Commission advocates that consumers who purchase a pre-need contract consider the following: - Understand if funeral goods or services, or both, have been purchased. - Where are the pre-paid funds held? Rules governing the custody of pre-paid funds vary state by state. - Pre-paid funeral arrangements are not covered by federal law and state law varies state by state. - Who benefits from the interest income if the pre-paid funds earn interest? - What protections are in place for the consumer in the event that the funeral home holding the pre-need contract goes out of business or is purchased by a national funeral home chain or is merged into another funeral home. - The specific cancellation or revision policy, including the refund policy. - Transferability of the pre-need contract to another funeral home and the associated expenses. - Up-front and on-going administrative or other fees paid to the funeral home.

A Pre-Need Funeral Contract is not, and should not be confused with a Pre-Need Funeral Plan, also known as a Funeral Plan.

== Specific prohibited misrepresentations ==
The Funeral Rule prohibits specific misrepresentations in six areas.

1. Embalming-The Funeral Rule prohibits funeral homes from telling consumers that state or local law requires embalming unless that is true. If state law requires embalming, the funeral home may tell the family that embalming is required to the specific circumstances.

Funeral homes must disclose in writing on the GPL that embalming is not required by law except in special circumstances and must include the following disclosure language: “Except in certain special cases, embalming is not required by law. Embalming may be necessary, however, if you select certain funeral arrangements, such as a funeral with a viewing. If you do not want embalming, you usually have the right to choose an arrangement that does not require you to pay for it, such as direct cremation or immediate burial.”

If state or local law does not require embalming under any circumstances, The Funeral Rule allows for the phrase “except in certain special cases” to be omitted. This disclosure should be placed directly next to the price for embalming.

If a family member wants to briefly view the deceased by lifting the lid of the casket prior to an immediate burial, The Funeral Rule prohibits the funeral home from charging the family for preparation of the body if embalming is declined. The request to see the deceased does not constitute a formal viewing or visitation.

2. Casket for Direct Cremation-The Funeral Rule prohibits funeral homes from telling consumers that state or local law requires the purchase of a casket for direct cremation, or for any other reason. If direct cremation is offered, The Funeral Rule dictates that an alternative container be available and that consumers be informed that such alternative container is available. This must be disclosed in writing on the GPL with the following language: “If you want to arrange a direct cremation, you can use an alternative container. Alternative containers encase the body and can be made of materials like fiberboard or composition materials (with or without an outside covering). The containers we provide are (specify containers)”.

The disclosure should be placed directly next to the price range for direct cremation. If direct cremation is not offered, that disclosure may be omitted.

3. Outer Burial Container-The Funeral Rule prohibits funeral homes from telling consumers that state or local law requires them to buy an outer burial container unless that not true. Consumers must also be told that state law does not require them to purchase an outer burial container.

Prices for outer burial containers may be included on the GPL or on a separate Outer Burial Container Price List. If included on the GPL, the following disclosure must be included and placed directly next to the outer burial container prices: “In most areas of the country, state or local law does not require that you buy a container to surround the casket in the grave. However, many cemeteries require that you have such a container so that the grave will not sink in. Either a grave liner or a burial vault will satisfy these requirements”.

If a separate Outer Burial Container Price List is used, the GPL must state the range of prices for the outer burial containers sold by the funeral home, along with the following disclosure: “A complete price list will be provided at the funeral home”.

4. Legal and Cemetery Requirements-The Funeral Rule states that funeral homes cannot tell consumers that any federal, state, or local law or a particular cemetery or crematory requires them to buy a particular good or service, if that is not true. If a consumer is told that a particular good or service must be purchased because of any legal, cemetery or crematory requirement, the applicable requirement must be identified and described on the Statement of Funeral Goods and Services Selected.

5. Preservative and Protective Value Claims-The Funeral Rule prohibits any representations to consumers that funeral goods or services will delay the natural decomposition of human remains for a long term or an indefinite time.

The Funeral Rule prohibits representation that funeral goods such as caskets or outer burial containers have protective features or will protect the body from gravesite substances because that is not true.

All warranty information must be provided to the family and it must be clarified by the funeral home that the claims made in the warranty are made by the manufacturer and not by the funeral home.

6. Cash Advance Items-If a funeral home charges a mark-up on cash advance items or receives a commission, discount or rebate that is not passed along to the consumer, the funeral home is prohibited from stating that the price charged for the cash advance item is the same as the actual cost. If a funeral home charges a mark-up, or receives a rebate, commission, or trade or volume discount, it must be disclosed to the consumer in writing on the Statement of Funeral Goods and Services Selected, with each cash advance item listed separately, with the following disclosure: “We charge you for our services in obtaining: (specify cash advance items)”.

The Funeral Rule does not prevent the funeral home from charging a mark-up on cash advance items, nor does it require the funeral home to disclose the amount of the charge, rebate, commission or discount.

== Other misrepresentations ==
Other kinds of misrepresentations, though not specifically prohibited by The Funeral Rule, are illegal. The Federal Trade Commission Act prohibits deceptive acts or practices.

== Problem solving guidelines ==
The Funeral Rule also provides a set of problem solving guidelines for consumers.

A complete copy of The Funeral Rule can be accessed at www.FTC.gov or by calling 1-877-FTC-HELP (1-877-382-4357), TTY 1-866-653-4261.
