= The Great Indoors (department store) =

Chain of home decor stores in the United States

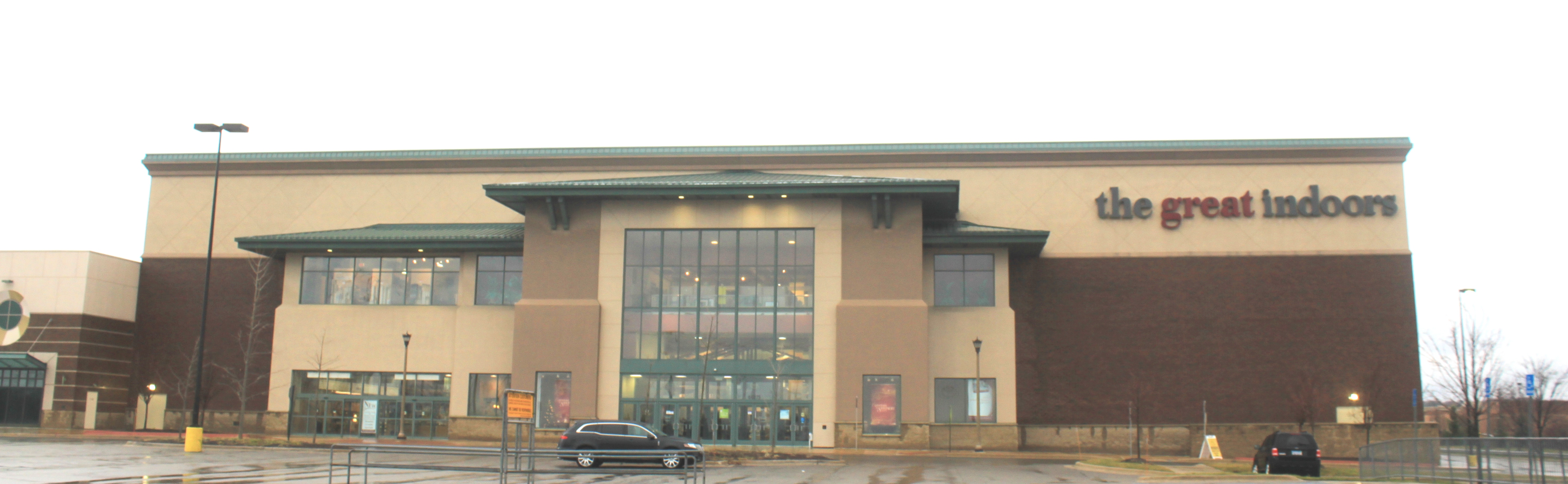
- Great Indoors store, Novi, Michigan, later a Sears Outlet.
- Company type: Subsidiary
- Industry: Home Decor
- Founded: 1997; 29 years ago
- Defunct: 2012; 14 years ago
- Fate: Closed up shop
- Number of locations: 9 stores (2012)
- Parent: Sears (1997-2005); Sears Holdings (2005-2012)
- Website: Internet Archive | Wayback Machine (https://web.archive.org/web/20070825014508/http://www.thegreatindoors.com/)

The Great Indoors was a chain of home decor stores in the United States, founded by Sears in 1997.

== Description ==
The Great Indoors were approximately 140,000 square feet each. Employing nearly 300 employees for each store. Stores were organized around the four main rooms of the home -- kitchen, bath, bedroom and the great room -- with a fifth area devoted to floors and walls. Each store showcased approximately 75 lifestyle vignettes with more than 50,000 items to help customers visualize solutions for their own rooms. Brands typically found within included Bosch, Kenmore, Bose, Calphalon, Corian, Croscill, Karastan, KitchenAid, Kohler, Thermador and Waverly. Many stores featured small cafes. No Sears logos or signage were displayed inside the store, although they did accept the Sears credit card as a form of payment. The company opened seven The Great Indoors stores in 2002, bringing the total to 20 stores, with an additional store planned to open in 2003.

== History ==
The Great Indoors concept was introduced in 1997. Sears believed it had growth potential within the following 10 years. However, the chain did not prove successful and Sears closed stores, starting with a first round in 2005. At one time, The Great Indoors had $550 million in sales.

On February 1, 1998, Sears, Roebuck and Co opened the first The Great Indoors store in Lone Tree, CO.

On November 1, 1999, Sears, Roebuck and Co opens the second The Great Indoors store in Scottsdale, AZ.

On December 18, 2011, Sears Holdings Corp closed the Broomfield, CO store.

On February 23, 2012, Sears Holdings Corp. announced it would be closing the remaining nine stores.

On July 8, 2012, Sears Holdings Corp closed the Lone Tree, CO store.

On August 14, 2019, the Sears Outlet operating in the former Great Indoors in Novi, MI closed.

== See also ==
- Sears Holdings
