= Steve Vladeck =

American legal scholar (born 1979)

Stephen I. Vladeck
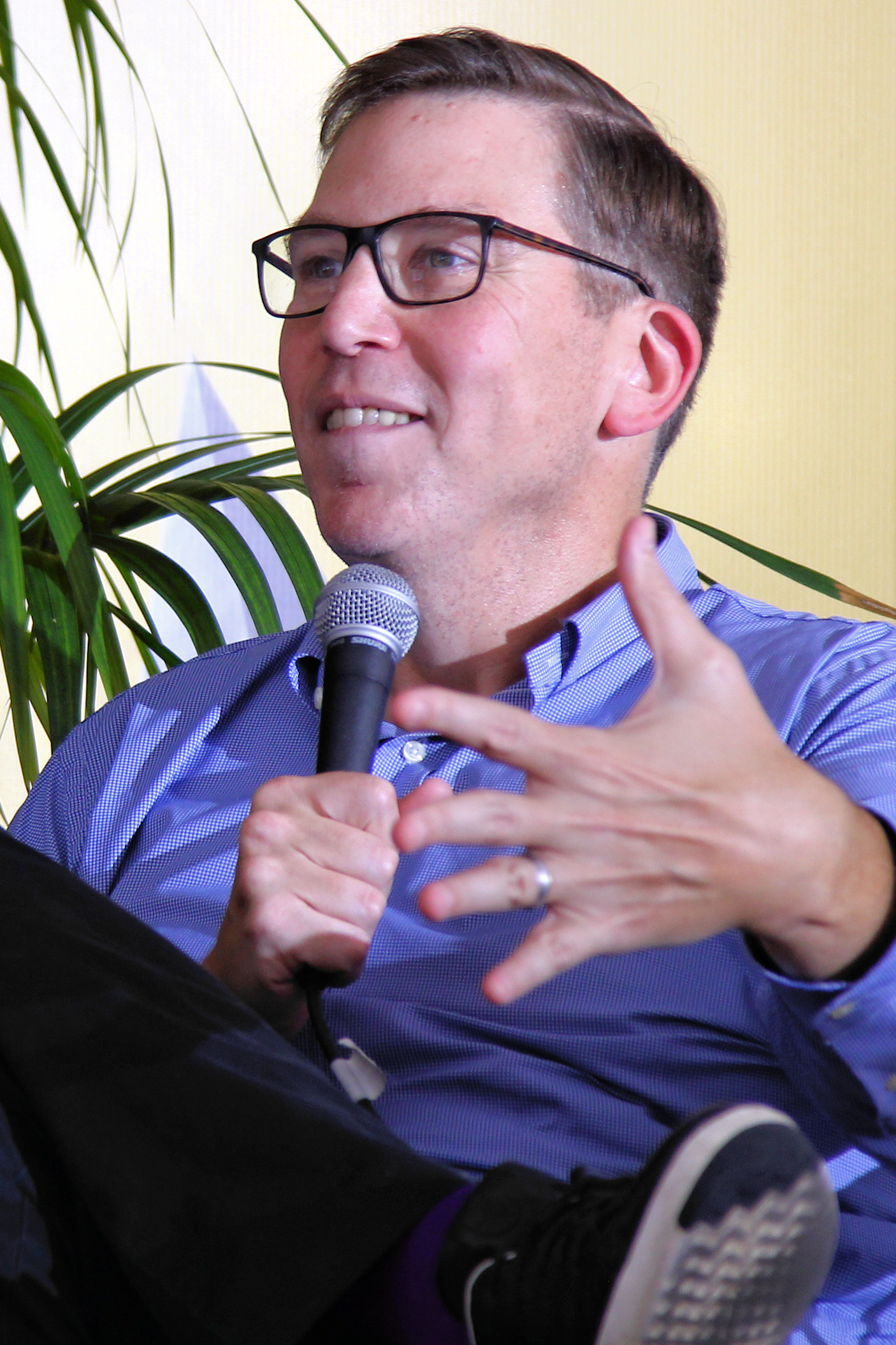
- Vladeck in 2023
- Born: Stephen Isaiah Vladeck; September 26, 1979 (age 46); New York City, U.S.
- Education: Amherst College (BA); Yale University (JD)
- Relatives: Judith Vladeck (grandmother); David Vladeck (uncle); Baruch Vladeck (great-grandfather)

Stephen Isaiah Vladeck (born September 26, 1979) is an American legal scholar. He is a professor at the Georgetown University Law Center, where he specializes in the federal courts, constitutional law, national security law, and military justice, especially with relation to the prosecution of war crimes. Vladeck has commented on the legality of the United States' use of extrajudicial detention and torture, and is a regular contributor to CNN.

== Early life and education ==
Vladeck, the son of Fredda Wellin Vladeck and Bruce C. Vladeck, was born and raised in New York City before moving to Silver Spring, Maryland, with his family when his father became administrator of the Health Care Financing Administration in 1993. He is the grandson of Judith Vladeck, a labor lawyer who won major sex and age discrimination cases, and the great-grandson of Baruch Charney Vladeck, a Socialist Party politician who served as the first majority leader of the New York City Council. Vladeck's uncle is Georgetown University Law Center professor and former director of the Bureau of Consumer Protection of the Federal Trade Commission David Vladeck.

At age 11, Vladeck appeared on the children's game show Where in the World is Carmen Sandiego? as a contestant on the episode titled "Blarney Burglary" in 1992, where the character Vic the Slick steals the Blarney Stone. As a teenager, Vladeck was heavily involved with quiz bowl, basketball, and baseball at Montgomery Blair High School.

After high school, Vladeck attended Amherst College, where he was active in the athletics department and double majored in history and mathematics. He graduated in 2001 with a bachelor's degree, summa cum laude. He then attended Yale Law School, where he was an executive editor of The Yale Law Journal and won the Harlan Fiske Stone Award for best oralist in the school's moot court competition. He graduated in 2004 with a Juris Doctor.

== Career ==
After law school, Vladeck was a law clerk to judge Marsha Berzon of the U.S. Court of Appeals for the Ninth Circuit from 2004 to 2005. He also clerked for judge Rosemary Barkett of the U.S. Court of Appeals for the Eleventh Circuit from May to August 2006.

Vladeck worked on the legal team managed by Neal K. Katyal that successfully challenged the constitutionality of George W. Bush's Guantanamo Military Commissions. In 2005, Vladeck joined the law faculty at the University of Miami School of Law in Coral Gables, Florida. In 2007, he joined the faculty at the Washington College of Law at American University. In 2016, he joined the faculty at the University of Texas School of Law, where he became the Charles Alan Wright Chair in Federal Courts. Vladeck is a founding member of Lawfare; an executive editor, prior co-editor-in-chief and contributor at Just Security; and a contributor at PrawfsBlawg. In 2024, Vladeck joined the faculty at Georgetown University Law Center.

== Personal life ==
In 2011, Vladeck married Karen Shafrir, the former managing director of Whistler Partners, a law firm for startup technology companies. As of 2024, Karen was the Founder & Managing Partner at Risepoint Search Partners, a boutique legal recruiting firm headquartered in Washington, D.C.

== Media ==
Vladeck co-hosts the National Security Law Podcast with fellow University of Texas law professor Robert Chesney.

== Selected publications ==
=== Books ===
- Vladeck, Stephen (May 16, 2023). The Shadow Docket: How the Supreme Court Uses Stealth Rulings to Amass Power and Undermine the Republic. Basic Books. ISBN 978-1-5416-0264-9. Review by Andrew Koppelman.

=== Scholarship ===
- Coauthor with Stephen Dycus, Arthur L. Berney, William C. Banks, & Peter Raven-Hansen National Security Law, 6th ed.
- Coauthor with Stephen Dycus, William C. Banks, & Peter Raven-Hansen Counter terrorism Law, 3rd ed. 2016
- Expert Opinion on the Current State of U.S. Surveillance Law and Authorities - Konferenz der unabhängigen Datenschutzbehörden des Bundes und der Länder

=== Opinion pieces ===
- Vladeck, Stephen I. (June 17, 2020). "How the Supreme Court Is Quietly Enabling Trump". The New York Times. ISSN 0362-4331.
- Vladeck, Stephen I. (August 19, 2020). "Why Are Senate Republicans Playing Dead?". The New York Times. ISSN 0362-4331.
- Vladeck, Stephen I. (November 8, 2020). "Elections Don't Have to Be So Chaotic and Excruciating". The New York Times. ISSN 0362-4331.
- Vladeck, Stephen I. (January 14, 2021). "Why Trump Can Be Convicted Even as an Ex-President". The New York Times. ISSN 0362-4331.
