= Judith Vladeck =

American lawyer (1923–2007)

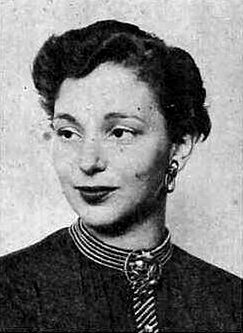
- Vladeck c. 1952
- Born: Judith Virginia Pomarlen; August 1, 1923; Norfolk, Virginia, U.S.
- Died: January 8, 2007 (aged 83); New York City, New York, U.S.
- Education: Hunter College (BA); Columbia University (LLB)
- Spouse: Stephen C. Vladeck
- Children: 3, including David
- Relatives: Steve Vladeck (grandson); Joe Pomarlen (father); Michael Pomarlen (first cousin)

Judith Pomarlen Vladeck (August 1, 1923 – January 8, 2007) was a prominent American labor lawyer and civil rights advocate, particularly on behalf of women. She helped set new legal precedents against sex discrimination and age discrimination.

== Life and career ==
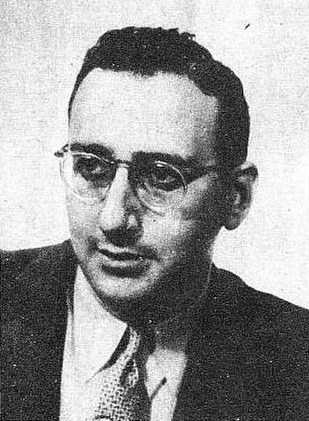
Stephen C. Vladeck c. 1948

Vladeck was born Judith Virginia Pomarlen in Norfolk, Virginia, the daughter of a newspaper distributor and a business manager for a labor union. Her parents were Joseph and Ida (Ehrlich) Pomarlen. She graduated from Hunter College in 1945 and received a law degree from Columbia University in 1948. She married lawyer Stephen Charney Vladeck (son of labor leader Baruch Charney Vladeck) on February 22, 1948, and had three children. In 1957 she joined the New York City law firm of Vladeck, Waldman, Elias & Engelhard, which her husband had helped found in 1948. She described the firm as "the last socialist law firm in America."

Vladeck turned her attention to workplace discrimination with the advent of new civil rights laws and rise of the women's movement. In a suit against the City University of New York filed in 1973, Ms. Vladeck traced salary histories for more than 5,000 female faculty members. The judge ruled the university had been discriminating against them for 15 years. In 1975, she represented a professor at Pace University who had been denied tenure. When the university’s lawyers tried to paint the plaintiff as a troublemaker who devoted too much time to challenging the system, Vladeck responded, "The only way women are tolerated is if they are supine, silent and submissive." The New York State Court of Appeals decision reflected Vladeck's words when it wrote, "Those who fight for rights are often perceived as troublesome, but the law does not require people to be supine."

One of her first big legal victories was in 1978 when she represented an engineer at Western Electric - the first female professional hired by the company - in a lawsuit alleging sexual discrimination. They won what ultimately became a class-action suit involving thousands of women, and in the process they "ended up redefining women's rights in the high-tech industry and across the economy," said the Forward's publisher, Samuel Norich.

In one of the "crowning moments of her career" Vladeck represented the not-for-profit organization Nontraditional Employment for Women in a case against the contractors building ~ what was to become the New York City neighborhood known as Battery Park City. As part of the out-of-court settlement, an apprenticeship program was created to help women train in construction. With the money that NEW was awarded, the organization also built the headquarters it had long lacked in a converted firehouse in New York City's Chelsea neighborhood. It was dedicated in 1989 as the Judith Vladeck Center for Women.

She was named one of "New York's 75 Most Influential Women in Business" in Crain's New York Business in 1996 and one of the Best Lawyers in New York by New York Magazine in 1995. She was profiled in the New York Times, The Institutional Investor, More and Mirabella Magazines, and featured in Stud's Terkel's book Coming of Age.

As a legal scholar, she served as director of the American Arbitration Association and the AFL-CIO Lawyers Coordinating Committee. She also taught employment and labor law at Fordham Law School and Cornell University School of Industrial and Labor Relations. In later life, she was the recipient of various awards from the American Bar Association, the New York County Lawyers Association, Columbia Law School, and Hunter College. Vladeck had two sons, one of whom, Bruce C. Vladeck is a health administrator, and one daughter, Anne, who is currently a partner in the Vladeck law firm.

In 1998, Vladeck received the Edith I. Spivack Award from the New York County Lawyers' Association's Women's Rights Committee, Margaret Brent Women Lawyers of Achievement Award from the ABA in 2002, the Edith I. Spivack Award from the New York County Lawyers Association in 1998, Outstanding Achievement Award from the National Network of Women Union Lawyers in 1998, ORT Jurisprudence Award in 1996, Hunter's Professional Achievement Award, and inducted into the Hunter College Hall of Fame.

She died on January 8, 2007, of an infection in New York City.
