= Federal Trade Commission =

United States government agency

- Seal of the Federal Trade Commission

- Flag of the Federal Trade Commission

Agency overview
- Formed: September 26, 1914; 112 years ago
- Preceding agency: Bureau of Corporations
- Jurisdiction: Federal government of the United States
- Headquarters: Federal Trade Commission Building Washington, DC
- Employees: 1,123 (FY 2021)
- Annual budget: $426.71 million (FY 2027)
- Agency executive: Andrew N. Ferguson, Chairman
- Website: ftc.gov

The Federal Trade Commission (FTC) is an independent agency of the United States government whose principal mission is the enforcement of civil (non-criminal) antitrust law and the promotion of consumer protection. It shares jurisdiction over federal civil antitrust law enforcement with the Antitrust Division of the U.S. Department of Justice. The FTC is headquartered in the Federal Trade Commission Building in Washington, D.C.

The FTC was established in 1914 by the Federal Trade Commission Act, which the U.S. Congress passed in response to the 19th-century monopolistic trust crisis. Since its inception, the FTC has enforced the provisions of the Clayton Act, a key U.S. antitrust statute, as well as the provisions of the FTC Act, 15 U.S.C. § 41 et seq. Over time, the FTC has been delegated with the enforcement of additional business regulation statutes and has promulgated a number of regulations (codified in Title 16 of the Code of Federal Regulations). The broad statutory authority granted to the FTC provides it with more surveillance and monitoring abilities than it actually uses.

The FTC is composed of five commissioners who are nominated by the president and subject to Senate confirmation. Commissioners serve seven-year terms, and historically could only be fired for "inefficiency, neglect of duty, or malfeasance in office". This changed following the Supreme Court's 2026 ruling in Trump v. Slaughter, where the Court determined that the president may fire independent commissioners at will. No more than three FTC members can be from the same party. One member of the body serves as FTC chair at the president's pleasure, with Commissioner Andrew N. Ferguson having served as chair since January 2025.

== History ==
=== Early history ===
In the aftermath of the U.S. Supreme Court's landmark decision in Standard Oil Co. of New Jersey v. United States in 1911, the first version of a bill to establish a commission to regulate interstate trade was introduced on January 25, 1912, by Oklahoma congressman Dick Thompson Morgan. He would make the first speech on the House floor advocating its creation on February 21, 1912.

Though the initial bill did not pass, the questions of trusts and antitrust dominated the 1912 election. Most political party platforms in 1912 endorsed the establishment of a federal trade commission with its regulatory powers placed in the hands of an administrative board, as an alternative to functions previously and necessarily exercised so slowly through the courts.

With the 1912 presidential election decided in favor of the Democrats and Woodrow Wilson, Morgan reintroduced a slightly amended version of his bill during the April 1913 special session. The national debate culminated in Wilson's signing of the FTC Act on September 26, 1914, with additional tightening of regulations in the Clayton Antitrust Act three weeks later.

The new FTC would absorb the staff and duties of Bureau of Corporations, previously established under the Department of Commerce and Labor in 1903. The FTC could additionally challenge "unfair methods of competition" and enforce the Clayton Act's more specific prohibitions against certain price discrimination, vertical arrangements, interlocking directorates, and stock acquisitions.

=== 1980s ===
In 1984, the FTC began to regulate the funeral home industry in order to protect consumers from deceptive practices. The FTC Funeral Rule requires funeral homes to provide all customers (and potential customers) with a General Price List (GPL), specifically outlining goods and services in the funeral industry, as defined by the FTC, and a listing of their prices. By law, the GPL must be presented on request to all individuals, and no one is to be denied a written, retainable copy of the GPL.

=== 1990s ===
In 1996, the FTC instituted the Funeral Rule Offenders Program (FROP), under which "funeral homes make a voluntary payment to the U.S. Treasury or appropriate state fund for an amount less than what would likely be sought if the Commission authorized filing a lawsuit for civil penalties. In addition, the funeral homes participate in the NFDA compliance program, which includes a review of the price lists, on-site training of the staff, and follow-up testing and certification on compliance with the Funeral Rule."

In the mid-1990s, the FTC launched the fraud sweeps concept where the agency and its federal, state, and local partners filed simultaneous legal actions against multiple telemarketing fraud targets. The first sweeps operation was Project Telesweep in July 1995 which cracked down on 100 business opportunity scams.

=== Bush administration ===
==== Gateway Learning case ====
In the 2004 case In re Gateway Learning Corp., the FTC alleged that Gateway committed unfair and deceptive trade practices by making retroactive changes to its privacy policy without informing customers and by violating its own privacy policy by selling customer information when it had said it would not. Gateway settled the complaint by entering into a consent decree with the FTC that required it to surrender some profits and placed restrictions upon Gateway for the following 20 years.

=== Obama administration ===
During the Obama Administration, Jon Leibowitz served as the Chair of the FTC until his resignation in 2013, after which he was succeeded by Edith Ramirez.

==== Sears Holdings case ====
In the 2009 case In the Matter of Sears Holdings Management Corp., the FTC alleged that a research software program provided by Sears was deceptive because it collected information about nearly all online behavior, a fact that was only disclosed in legalese, buried within the end user license agreement. The FTC secured a consent decree in the case.

==== Money Now Funding / Cash4Businesses case ====
In September 2013, a federal court closed an elusive business opportunity scheme on the request of the FTC, namely "Money Now Funding"/"Cash4Businesses". The FTC alleged that the defendants misrepresented potential earnings, violated the National Do Not Call Register, and violated the FTC's Business Opportunity Rule in preventing a fair consumer evaluation of the business. This was one of the first definitive actions taken by any regulator against a company engaging in transaction laundering, where almost US$6 million were processed illicitly.

In December 2018, two defendants, Nikolas Mihilli and Dynasty Merchants, LLC, settled with the FTC. They were banned from processing credit card transactions, though the initial monetary judgment of $5.8 million was suspended due to the defendant's inability to pay.

==== OMICS Publishing Group case ====
In 2016, the FTC launched action against the academic journal publisher OMICS Publishing Group for producing predatory journals and organizing predatory conferences. This action, partly in response to ongoing pressure from the academic community, is the first action taken by the FTC against an academic journal publisher.

The complaint alleges that the defendants have been "deceiving academics and researchers about the nature of its publications and hiding publication fees ranging from hundreds to thousands of dollars". It additionally notes that "OMICS regularly advertises conferences featuring academic experts who were never scheduled to appear in order to attract registrants" and that attendees "spend hundreds or thousands of dollars on registration fees and travel costs to attend these scientific conferences." Manuscripts are also sometimes held hostage, with OMICS refusing to allow submissions to be withdrawn and thereby preventing resubmission to another journal for consideration. Library scientist Jeffrey Beall has described OMICS as among the most egregious of predatory publishers. In November 2017, a federal court in the Court for the District of Nevada granted a preliminary injunction that:

prohibits the defendants from making misrepresentations regarding their academic journals and conferences, including that specific persons are editors of their journals or have agreed to participate in their conferences. It also prohibits the defendants from falsely representing that their journals engage in peer review, that their journals are included in any academic journal indexing service or any measurement of the extent to which their journals are cited. It also requires that the defendants clearly and conspicuously disclose all costs associated with submitting or publishing articles in their journals.

In April 2019, the court imposed a fine of US$50.1 million on OMICS companies for unfair and deceptive business practices.

=== Activities in the healthcare industry ===
In addition to prospective analysis of the effects of mergers and acquisitions, the FTC has recently resorted to retrospective analysis and monitoring of consolidated hospitals. Thus, it also uses retroactive data to demonstrate that some hospital mergers and acquisitions are hurting consumers, particularly in terms of higher prices. Here are some recent examples of the FTC's success in blocking or unwinding of hospital consolidations or affiliations:

==== Phoebe Putney Memorial Hospital and Palmyra Medical Center in Georgia ====
In April 2011, the FTC successfully challenged in court the $195 million acquisition of Palmyra Medical Center by Phoebe Putney Memorial Hospital. The FTC alleged that the transaction would create a monopoly as it would "reduce competition significantly and allow the combined Phoebe/Palmyra to raise prices for general acute-care hospital services charged to commercial health plans, substantially harming patients and local employers and employees". The Supreme Court on February 19, 2013, ruled in favor of the FTC.

==== ProMedica health system and St. Luke's hospital in Ohio ====
Similarly, court attempts by ProMedica health system in Ohio to overturn an order by the FTC to the company to unwind its 2010 acquisition of St. Luke's hospital were unsuccessful. The FTC claimed that the acquisition would hurt consumers through higher premiums because insurance companies would be required to pay more. In December 2011, an administrative judge upheld the FTC's decision, noting that the behavior of ProMedica health system and St. Luke's was indeed anticompetitive. The court ordered ProMedica to divest St. Luke's to a buyer that would be approved by the FTC within 180 days of the date of the order.

==== OSF healthcare system and Rockford Health System in Illinois ====
In November 2011, the FTC filed a lawsuit alleging that the proposed acquisition of Rockford by OSF would drive up prices for general acute-care inpatient services as OSF would face only one competitor (SwedishAmerican health system) in the Rockford area and would have a market share of 64%. Later in 2012, OSF announced that it had abandoned its plans to acquire Rockford Health System.

=== First Trump administration ===
==== Meta antitrust acquisitions case ====
In December 2020, the FTC sued Meta (formally known as Facebook) for anticompetitive conduct under Section 2 of the Sherman Act, which prohibits improper monopolization of a market. The FTC accused Meta of buying up its competitors to stifle competition which reduced the range of services available to consumers and by creating fewer social media platforms for advertisers to target.

=== Biden administration ===
The FTC was chaired by Lina Khan during the Biden Administration.

In the 2021 United States Supreme Court case, AMG Capital Management, LLC v. FTC, the Court found unanimously that the FTC did not have power under 15 U.S.C. § 53(b) of the FTC Act, amended in 1973, to seek equitable relief in courts; it had the power to seek only injunctive relief. Faced with this limitation, the FTC engaged in substantial unilateral activity under its independent rulemaking authority, particularly as to Section 5, which is the FTC's arsenal of powers related to market structure and stimulation of competition. Khan herself had written a law review article in 2023 foreshadowing this strategy and highlighting what she saw as the FTC's underutilized market regulatory powers.

==== Google ====
In November 2024, U.S. district judge Amit Mehta agreed with Assistant Attorney General Jonathan Kanter and FTC Chair Khan, ruling the company a monopoly, and ordering Google to sell its Chrome web browser. In September 2025, Mehta reversed course, ruling that Google would not be forced to sell Chrome. In lieu, Google must share data with search competitors and avoid exclusivity deals with hardware manufacturers.

==== Banning non-compete clauses ====
This FTC attempted to ban nearly every non-compete clause. This began with an FTC rule in April 2024. The agency estimates 30 million workers are bound by these clauses and only excludes senior executives from the ban on enforcing non-competes. The agency believes that this will allow workers to find better working conditions and pay, since switching companies, on average, provides the biggest pay raises. It also allows workers to leave abusive work environments and can prevent some doctors from having to leave medicine once they leave a practice. The ban was put on hold by U.S. district judge Ada Brown on July 3, 2024, but then upheld on appeal by U.S. district judge Kelley B. Hodge on July 23, 2024. On August 20, 2024, a federal court in Texas overturned the FTC's ban on non-compete agreements, which was originally scheduled to take effect on September 4, 2024. U.S. district judge Ada Brown said the FTC did not have the authority to issue the ban, which she said was "unreasonably overbroad without a reasonable explanation." Victoria Graham, an FTC spokeswoman responded to the ruling by stating "We are seriously considering a potential appeal..."

==== Chip manufacturers ====
The FTC blocked Nvidia from purchasing Arm Holdings in 2022.

==== Pharmaceutical drug prices ====
The FTC has pursued lawsuits against companies to lower drug prices, including for insulin and for inhalers.

The FTC launched its investigation into pharmacy benefit managers (PBMs) in 2022. In July 2024, it released an interim report on its 2-year investigation into pharmacy benefit managers, the agency requested documents from the six largest PBMs as part of its investigation. The three largest – UnitedHealth Group's OptumRx, Cigna's Express Scripts and CVS Health's Caremark – manage about 80% of U.S. prescriptions. The top three PBMs share a parent company with a large medical insurance company. The FTC accused these companies of raising drug prices through conflicts of interest, vertical integration, concentration, and exclusivity provisions; the agency also alleged that the companies created a rebate system that prioritized high rebates from drug manufacturers, among other factors. The agency stated that several PBMs failed to provide documents in a timely manner and warned that it could take the companies to court to force them to comply, during the announcement in the preliminary findings. In September 2024, the FTC sued the three largest pharmacy benefit managers (PBMs) for allegedly engaging in anti-competitive practices that increased their profits while artificially inflating the list price of insulin. The agency is seeking to prohibit the PBMs from favoring medicines because certain pharmaceuticals make them more money.

==== Fake online reviews ====
In August 2024, the FTC announced it would finalize rules to ban fake reviews and testimonials online.

==== Food prices ====
In February 2024, the FTC challenged the Kroger-Albertsons merger, arguing it would drive up grocery and pharmacy prices, worsen service, and lower wages and working conditions. On December 10, 2024, U.S. district judge Adrienne Nelson agreed with the FTC, that the merger would risk reducing competition at the expense of both consumers and workers. Judge Nelson halted Kroger's $24.6 billion acquisition of Albertsons with a preliminary injunction.

In March 2024, the FTC released a report that found higher profit margins as a driver of inflation for grocery prices.

In August 2024, it announced it would be probing grocery prices to look for anti-competitive behavior and price gouging at chain supermarkets.

==== Junk fees, high prices, and the "click to cancel" subscription rule ====
In October 2023, the FTC proposed a new rule that would ensure that the cancellation process of subscription services is as easy as the process of signing up. On October 16, 2024, the FTC announced the new rule, dubbed "click to cancel", requiring companies to make subscription services "as easy for consumers to cancel their enrollment as it was to sign up." Khan said in an interview that the new rule is designed so that if consumers signed up online, they must also be able to cancel on the same website in the same number of steps. The rule's final provisions will go into effect 180 days after it is published in the Federal Register. On May 9, 2025, the FTC voted to delay enforcing compliance on the "Click to cancel" provision until July 14, 2025.

On July 8, 2025, the U.S. Court of Appeals for the Eighth Circuit vacated the rule, holding that the FTC had failed to conduct a statutorily required preliminary regulatory analysis.

It also targeted airlines and credit card companies over junk fees and high prices. The rule for junk fees which covers, businesses selling live-event tickets and short-term lodging, requires disclosing total price upfront, and no misrepresentations about fees and charges, went into effect on May 12, 2025.

==== Microsoft merger ====
In October 2023, the FTC authorized an administrative complaint against the merger between Microsoft and Activision Blizzard, Inc. The FTC alleged the deal would suppress competitors from accessing future content/games developed by Activision once the deal goes through. The FTC dropped its lawsuit on July 20, 2023. Microsoft had to restructure its deal to appease UK regulators. Microsoft reneged on promises it made in court filings by laying off 1900 employees in January 2024, signaling that it did not plan to let Activision Blizzard remain as independent as it had promised and leading the FTC to continue to appeal the decision.

==== Right to repair ====
In July 2021, the FTC voted unanimously to enforce the right to repair as policy and to look to take action against companies that limit the type of repair work that can be done at independent repair shops. In October 2024, following a comment by the FTC to the US Copyright Office, an exemption to the Digital Millennium Copyright Act was granted allowing for repair of retail-level food preparation equipment, such as McDonald's ice cream machines.

==== AI ====
In July 2023, the FTC issued a civil investigative demand to OpenAI to investigate whether the company's data security and privacy practices to develop ChatGPT were unfair or harmed consumers (including by reputational harm) in violation of Section 5 of the Federal Trade Commission Act of 1914. These are typically preliminary investigative matters and are nonpublic, but the FTC's document was leaked. In July 2023, the FTC launched an investigation into OpenAI, the creator of ChatGPT, over allegations that the company scraped public data and published false and defamatory information. They asked OpenAI for comprehensive information about its technology and privacy safeguards, as well as any steps taken to prevent the recurrence of situations in which its chatbot generated false and derogatory content about people.

In November 2023, the FTC passed an omnibus resolution to increase its ability to investigate companies adding AI into their products or making AI.

The agency then reported concern with the Microsoft-Open AI partnership and the Amazon-Anthropic partnership. The circular spending in which, for example, Microsoft gives OpenAI credit to Microsoft Azure and the companies provide each other access to engineering talent was of particular concern for its potential negative impacts to the public.

In August 2024, the FTC voted unanimously to ban marketers from using fake user reviews created by generative AI chatbots and influencers paying for bots to increase follower counts.

=== Second Trump administration ===
On March 18, 2025, President Trump ordered the dismissal of Democratic commissioners Alvaro Bedoya and Rebecca Kelly Slaughter. Presidents historically did not have statutory authority to fire FTC commissioners for reasons other than inefficiency, neglect of duty, or malfeasance, a precedent upheld in Humphrey's Executor.

Bedoya and Slaughter both stated the attempted firings were unlawful. Bedoya described it as "corruption plain and simple," while Slaughter stated it "violat[ed] the plain language of a statute and clear Supreme Court precedent."

Republicans, including FTC chair Andrew N. Ferguson, have argued that Humphrey's Executor was wrongly decided. Legal analysts expect the firings of Bedoya and Slaughter, along with the attempted firing of Democratic NLRB member Gwynne Wilcox, to serve as a test case that will enable the Supreme Court to overrule Humphrey's Executor and grant the President unlimited authority to fire commissioners of independent agencies such as the FTC, NLRB, and the Federal Reserve.

On June 29, 2026, the Supreme Court ruled in Trump v. Slaughter that FTC commissioners could be fired at the discretion of the President, allowing for the two Democratic commissioners removal. This ruling overturned Humphrey's Executor entirely, with the Chief Justice John Roberts writing on behalf of the Court, "[i]f anything more is left of Humphrey's, the Court overrules it".

In July 2025, the FTC held a workshop on what it deemed "unfair or deceptive trade practices" in the provision of transgender health care, with a focus on trans healthcare for minors; done as part of the Trump administration's larger campaign to curtail trans rights. The event involved testimony from "anti-trans activists and clinicians", and detransitioners, during which such speakers stated that it constituted fraud for a doctor use someone's preferred pronouns. Another testimony stated, "No one is born with gender dysphoria."

In March 2026, the FTC issued a warning against PayPal, Stripe, Visa, and Mastercard for debanking of law-abiding citizens over political, religious or certain law-abiding activities.

== Organization ==
=== Current members of the FTC ===
The commission is headed by five commissioners, who each serve seven-year terms. Commissioners are nominated by the president and confirmed by the Senate. No more than three commissioners can be of the same political party. In practice, this means that two commissioners are of the opposition party. However, three members of the FTC throughout its history have been without party affiliation, with the most recent independent, Pamela Jones Harbour, serving from 2003 to 2009. The FTC Act allows commissioners to remain in their position after their term expires until a replacement has been appointed.

The commission members as of May 25, 2026 are:

Position	Portrait	Name	Party	Prior experience	Education	Term began	Term expires
Chair		Andrew N. Ferguson	Republican	Solicitor general of Virginia	University of Virginia (BA) University of Virginia School of Law (JD)	April 2, 2024	September 26, 2030
Commissioner		Mark Meador	Republican	Department of Justice attorney	University of Chicago (BA) University of Houston Law Center (JD)	April 16, 2025	September 26, 2031
Commissioner		Vacant	—N/a	—	—	—	September 26, 2026
Commissioner		Vacant	—N/a	—	—	—	September 26, 2029
Commissioner		Vacant	—N/a	—	—	—	September 26, 2032

=== Nominations ===
In November 2026, president Donald Trump nominated Chris Mufarrige to the commission. He awaits Senate confirmation.

Name	Party	Prior experience	Term expires	Replacing
Chris Mufarrige	Republican	Director, FTC Bureau of Consumer Protection	September 26, 2033	Alvaro Bedoya

=== Bureaus ===
How to File a Complaint with the Federal Trade Commission, from the FTC

The FTC has three main bureaus: the Bureau of Competition, the Bureau of Consumer Protection, and the Bureau of Economics.

==== Bureau of Competition ====
The Bureau of Competition is the division of the FTC charged with elimination and prevention of "anticompetitive" business practices. It accomplishes this through the enforcement of antitrust laws, review of proposed mergers, and investigation into other non-merger business practices that may impair competition. Such non-merger practices include horizontal restraints, involving agreements between direct competitors, and vertical restraints, involving agreements among businesses at different levels in the same industry (such as suppliers and commercial buyers).

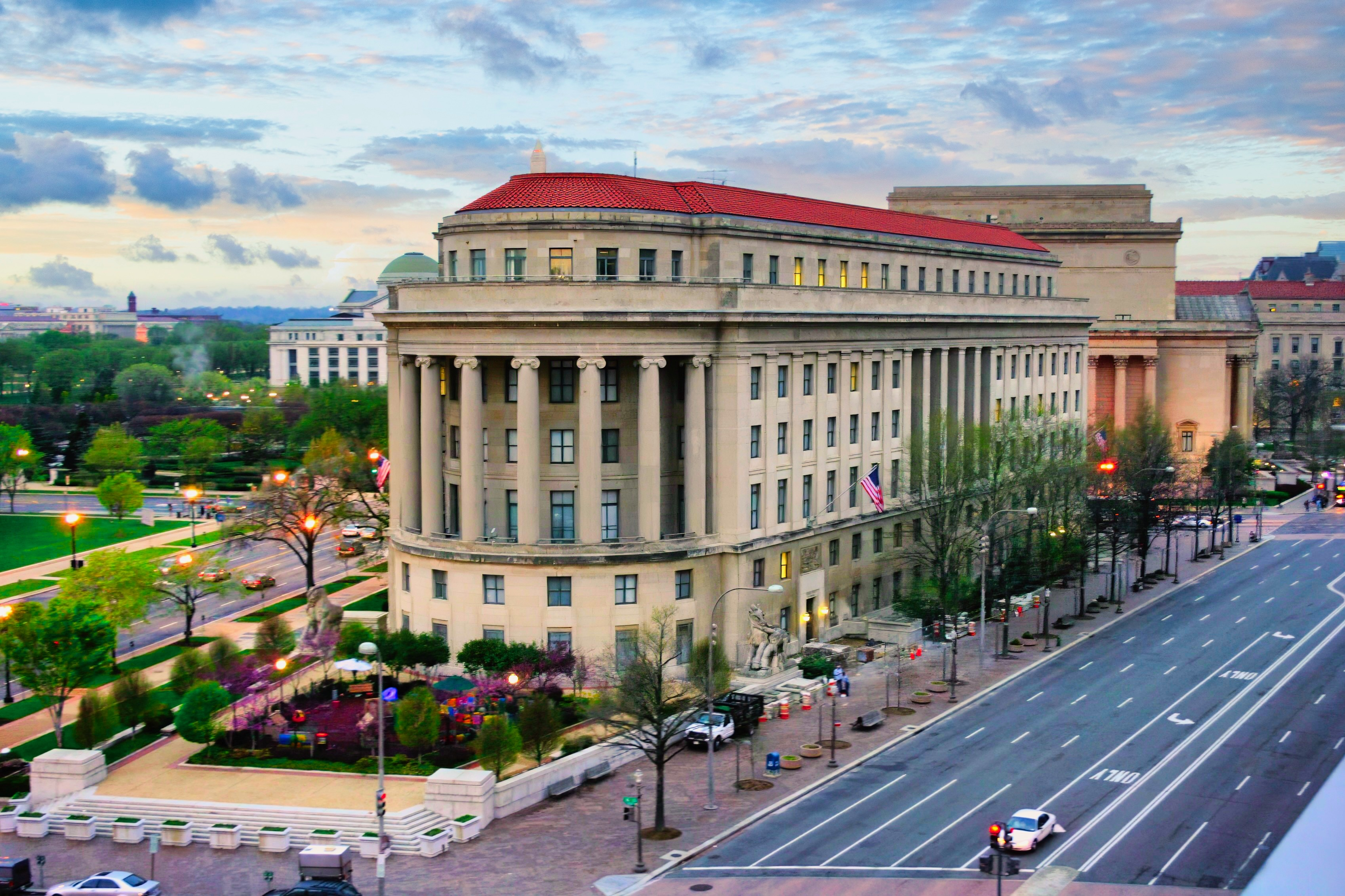
Apex Building, built in 1938 (FTC headquarters) in Washington, DC

The FTC shares enforcement of antitrust laws with the Department of Justice. However, while the FTC is responsible for civil enforcement of antitrust laws, the Antitrust Division of the Department of Justice has the power to bring both civil and criminal action in antitrust matters.

==== Bureau of Consumer Protection ====
The Bureau of Consumer Protection's mandate is to protect consumers against unfair or deceptive acts or practices in commerce. With the written consent of the commission, Bureau attorneys enforce federal laws related to consumer affairs and rules promulgated by the FTC. Its functions include investigations, enforcement actions, and consumer and business education. Areas of principal concern for this bureau are: advertising and marketing, financial products and practices, telemarketing fraud, privacy and identity protection, etc. The bureau also is responsible for the United States National Do Not Call Registry.

Under the FTC Act, the commission has the authority, in most cases, to bring its actions in federal court through its own attorneys. In some consumer protection matters, the FTC appears with, or supports, the U.S. Department of Justice.

==== Bureau of Economics ====
The Bureau of Economics, originally the Economics Divison, was established in 1954 to support the Bureau of Competition and Consumer Protection by providing expert knowledge related to the economic impacts of the FTC's legislation and operation.

==== Other offices ====
- The FTC maintains an Office of Technology Research and Investigation to assist it in technology-related enforcement actions.
- The FTC generally selects its chief technologist from among computer science academics and noted practitioners. The role is vacant as of July 2026, but previously has been filled by:
  - Stephanie Nguyen (2022-2025)
  - Erie Meyer (2021)
  - Neil Chilson (2017-2018)
  - Lorrie Cranor (2016-2017)
  - Ashkan Soltani (2014-2015)
  - Latanya Sweeney (2014)
  - Steven Bellovin (2012-2013)
  - Edward Felten (2011-2012)
- The FTC also maintains an academic in residence program, inviting leading legal scholars to join the FTC for a year as a senior policy advisor. The role has been held by Tim Wu in 2011, Paul Ohm in 2012, and Andrea M. Matwyshyn in 2014.

== Activities ==
The FTC investigates issues raised by reports from consumers and businesses, pre-merger notification filings, congressional inquiries, or reports in the media. These issues include, for instance, false advertising and other forms of fraud. FTC investigations may pertain to a single company or an entire industry. If the results of the investigation reveal unlawful conduct, the FTC may seek voluntary compliance by the offending business through a consent order, file an administrative complaint, or initiate federal litigation. During the course of regulatory activities, the FTC is authorized to collect records, but not on-site inspections.

Traditionally an administrative complaint is heard in front of an independent administrative law judge (ALJ) with FTC staff acting as prosecutors. The case is reviewed de novo by the full FTC commission which then may be appealed to the U.S. Court of Appeals and finally to the Supreme Court.

Under the FTC Act, the federal courts retain their traditional authority to issue equitable relief, including the appointment of receivers, monitors, the imposition of asset freezes to guard against the spoliation of funds, immediate access to business premises to preserve evidence, and other relief including financial disclosures and expedited discovery. In numerous cases, the FTC employs this authority to combat serious consumer deception or fraud. Additionally, the FTC has rulemaking power to address concerns regarding industry-wide practices. Rules promulgated under this authority are known as Trade Rules.

One of the Federal Trade Commission's other major focuses is identity theft. The FTC serves as a federal repository for individual consumer complaints regarding identity theft. Even though the FTC does not resolve individual complaints, it does use the aggregated information to determine where federal action might be taken. The complaint form is available online or by phone (1-877-ID-THEFT).

The FTC has been involved in the oversight of the online advertising industry and its practice of behavioral targeting for some time. In 2011 the FTC proposed a "Do Not Track" mechanism to allow Internet users to opt-out of behavioral targeting.

The FTC, along with the Environmental Protection Agency and Department of Justice also empowers third-party enforcer-firms to engage in some regulatory oversight, e.g. the FTC requires other energy companies to audit offshore oil platform operators.

In 2013, the FTC issued a comprehensive revision of its Green guides, which set forth standards for environmental marketing.

=== Unfair or deceptive practices affecting consumers ===
Endorsement Guides from the FTC

Section 5 of the Federal Trade Commission Act, 15 U.S.C. § 45 grants the FTC power to investigate and prevent deceptive trade practices. The statute declares that "unfair methods of competition in or affecting commerce, and unfair or deceptive acts or practices in or affecting commerce, are hereby declared unlawful."

Unfairness and deception towards consumers represent two distinct areas of FTC enforcement and authority. The FTC also has authority over unfair methods of competition between businesses.

==== Definitions of unfairness ====
Courts have identified three main factors that must be considered in consumer unfairness cases: (1) whether the practice injures consumers; (2) whether the practice violates established public policy; and (3) whether it is unethical or unscrupulous.

==== Definitions of deception ====
In a letter to the chairman of the House Committee on Energy and Commerce, the FTC defined the elements of deception cases. First, "there must be a representation, omission or practice that is likely to mislead the consumer." In the case of omissions, the Commission considers the implied representations understood by the consumer.

A misleading omission occurs when information is not disclosed to correct reasonable consumer expectations. Second, the commission examines the practice from the perspective of a reasonable consumer being targeted by the practice. Finally the representation or omission must be a material one – that is one that would have changed consumer behavior.

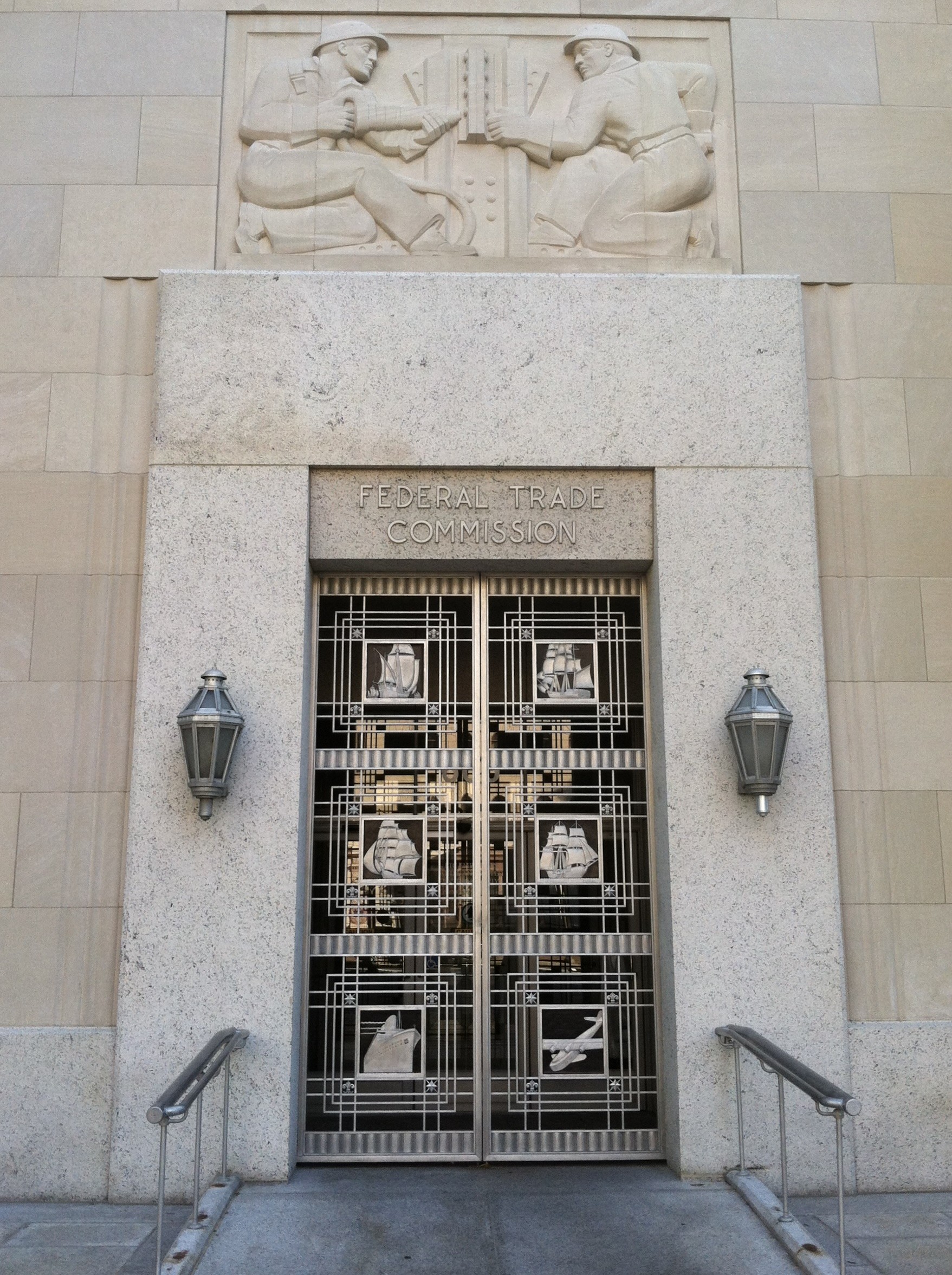
Federal Trade Commission entrance doorway in Washington, DC

===== Dot Com Disclosures guide =====
In its Dot Com Disclosures guide, the FTC said that "disclosures that are required to prevent deception or to provide consumers material information about a transaction must be presented clearly and conspicuously." The FTC suggested a number of different factors that would help determine whether the information was "clear and conspicuous" including but not limited to:

- the placement of the disclosure in an advertisement and its proximity to the claim it is qualifying,
- the prominence of the disclosure,
- whether items in other parts of the advertisement distract attention from the disclosure,
- whether the advertisement is so lengthy that the disclosure needs to be repeated,
- whether disclosures in audio messages are presented in an adequate volume and cadence and visual disclosures appear for a sufficient duration, and
- whether the language of the disclosure is understandable to the intended audience.

However, the "key is the overall net impression."

== See also ==
- Children's Online Privacy Protection Act
- Competition policy
- Competition regulator
- Consumer Financial Protection Bureau
- Consumer Product Safety Commission
- Fair Debt Collection Practices Act
- Franchising
- FTC Fair Information Practices
- FTC regulation of behavioral advertising
- Gramm–Leach–Bliley Act
- Humphrey's Executor v. United States
- Information broker
- Sweepstakes
- United States v. Google Inc.
