= Leifeng =

Leifeng may refer to:

- Leifeng Subdistrict (雷锋街道), a subdistrict in Wangcheng District, Changsha, Hunan, China
- Leifeng Pagoda (雷峰塔), a pagoda on the south bank of West Lake in Hangzhou, Zhejiang, China
- Leifeng Pagoda Music Ceremony (雷峰夕照音乐大典), a work for music ceremony composed and directed by He Xuntian.
- Leifeng Stadium (雷峰体育场), a multi-purpose stadium of Shuncheng District, Fushun, Liaoning, China
- Leifeng, Fujian (雷峰镇), a township-level division of Fujian, China

== See also ==
- Lei Feng (雷锋; 1940–1962), Chinese Communist propaganda symbol
