= Udumbara (disambiguation) =

Ficus racemosa, known as Udumbara, is a species of fig tree.

Udumbara may also refer to:

- Udumbara (Buddhism), the use of Ficus racemosa as a symbol in Buddhist literature
- Udumbara (film), a 2018 Sri Lankan film
- Udumbaravati, former name of the city Amravati in Maharashtra, India
- Whirling Udumbara I, a 2013 work for piano composed by He Xuntian
- Whirling Udumbara II, a 2012 work for He-drum and string orchestra composed by He Xuntian
- Whirling Udumbara II (piano), a 2012 work for piano composed by He Xuntian
- Whirling Udumbara II (trio), a 2012 work for viola, cello, and He-drum composed by He Xuntian

== See also ==
- Uthumphon (fl. 1757–1796), a monarch of the Ayutthaya Kingdom of Siam
