= FuSe Pattern (trio) =

1997 composition by He Xuntian

- by Xuntian He
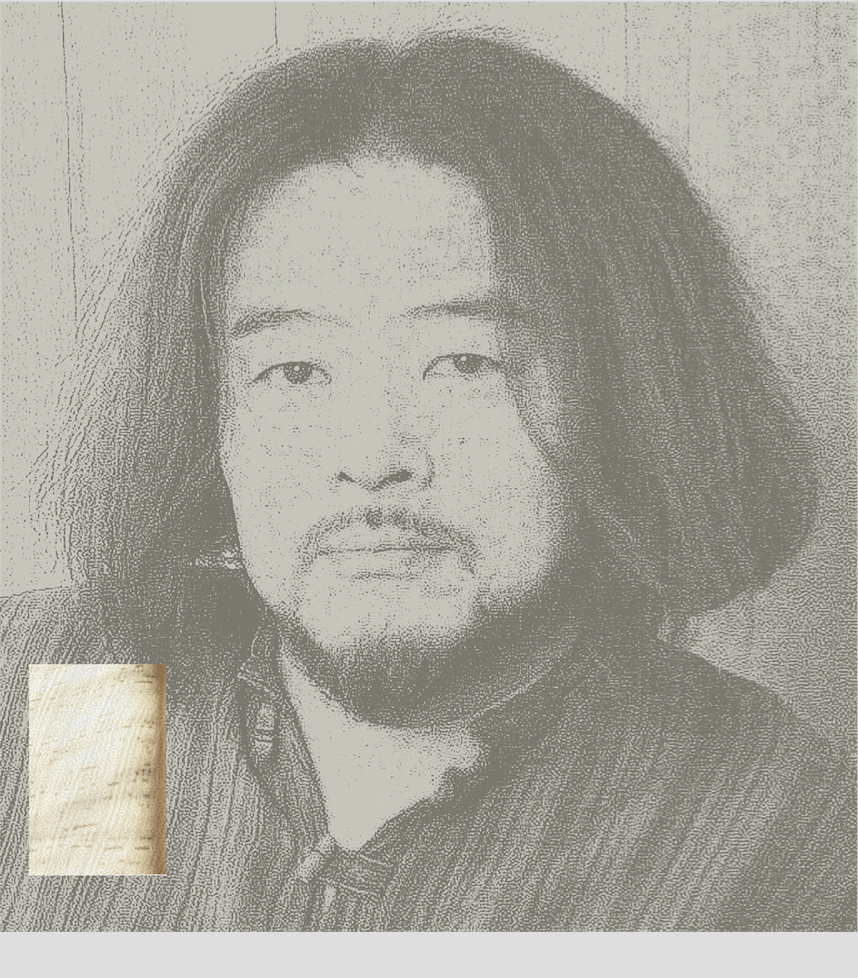
- HE XUNTIAN

FuSe Pattern ( 拂色图 ) is a work for piccolo, flute and violin, composed by He Xuntian in 1997.

== Summary ==
He Xuntian adopted RD Composition and SS Composition in his work FuSe Pattern (trio).

== Inspiration ==
FuSe Pattern (trio) was inspired from Xuntian He's ideology:

Primordial music for all species.
Humanity's first gift of sound to all species.

Making no distinction between ancient and modern;
no distinction between north, south, east and west;
no distinction between above and below, left and right;
no distinction between primary and secondary positions;
no distinction between beginning and end.

== First performance ==
FuSe Pattern (trio) for piccolo, flute and violin.
4. August 2000 Yokohama (J) 21st Asian Composers League Conference and Festival 2000
Shanghai New Music Ensemble.
