= Sounds of Nature =

1986 composition by He Xuntian

- by Xuntian He
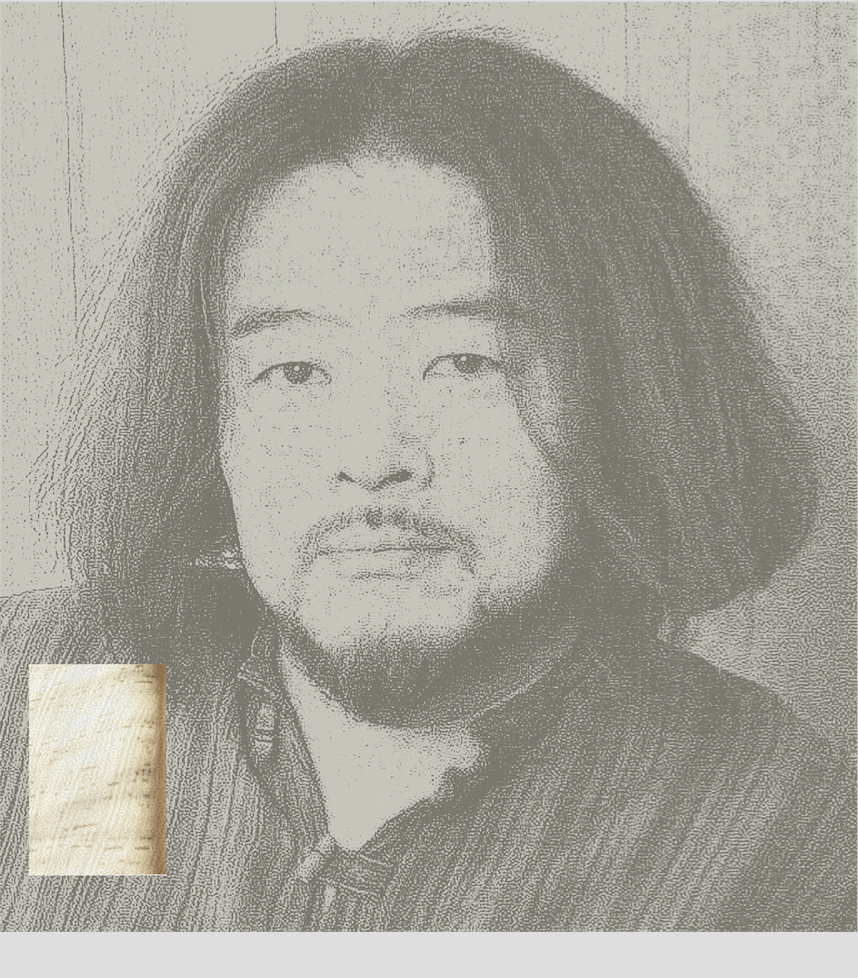
- HE XUNTIAN

Sounds of Nature ( 天籁 ) is a work for unconventional Instruments (seven performers), composed by He Xuntian in 1986.

== Summary ==
He Xuntian adopted RD Composition in his work Sounds of Nature.

The work won The Outstanding Musical Achievement Award of The International New Music Composers Competition 1989-90 USA.

== Performance ==
Sounds of Nature, He Xuntian Symphony Works Concert 1988
Dirigent: He Xuntian
Sounds of Nature Ensemble
30. November 1988, Beijing Concert Hall, Beijing
