= Tonal Patterns =

1985 composition by He Xuntian

- by Xuntian He
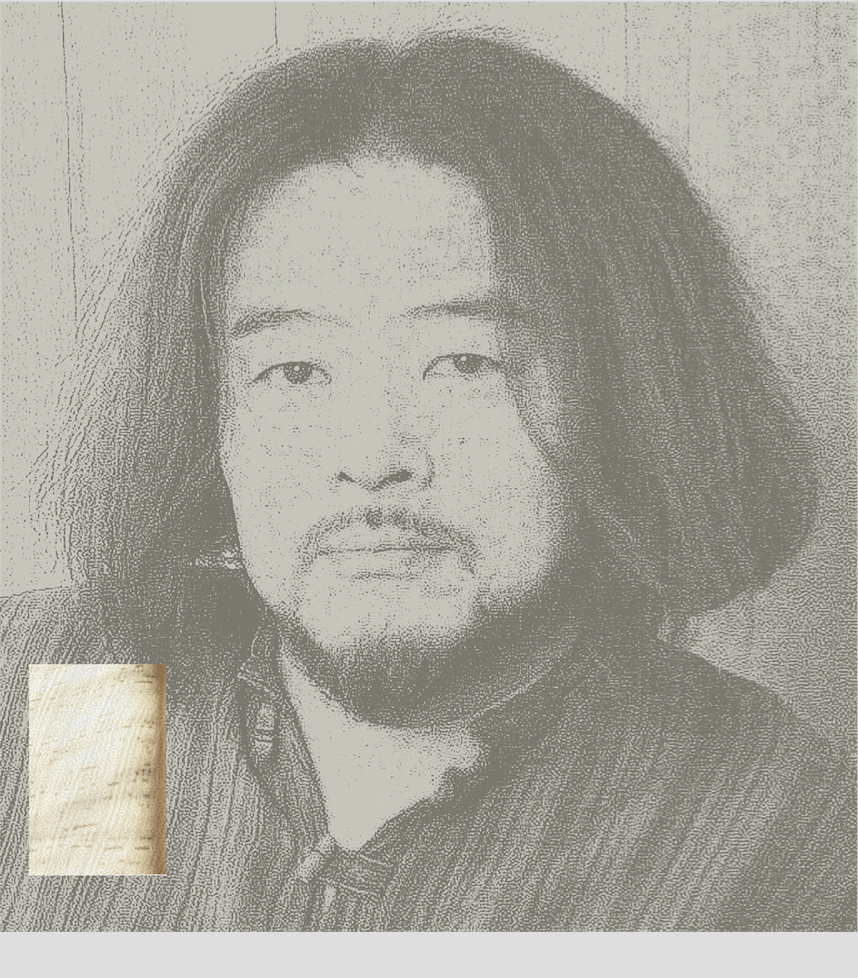
- HE XUNTIAN

Tonal Patterns ( 平仄 ) is a work for symphony orchestra, composed by He Xuntian in 1985.

== Summary ==
He Xuntian adopted RD Composition (Renyilv Duiyingfa Composition) in his work Tonal Patterns.

== First performance ==
Tonal Patterns
He Xuntian Symphony Works Concert 1988
30. November 1988, Beijing Concert Hall, Beijing
China National Symphony Orchestra
