= Telepathy (He Xuntian) =

1987 composition by He Xuntian

- by Xuntian He
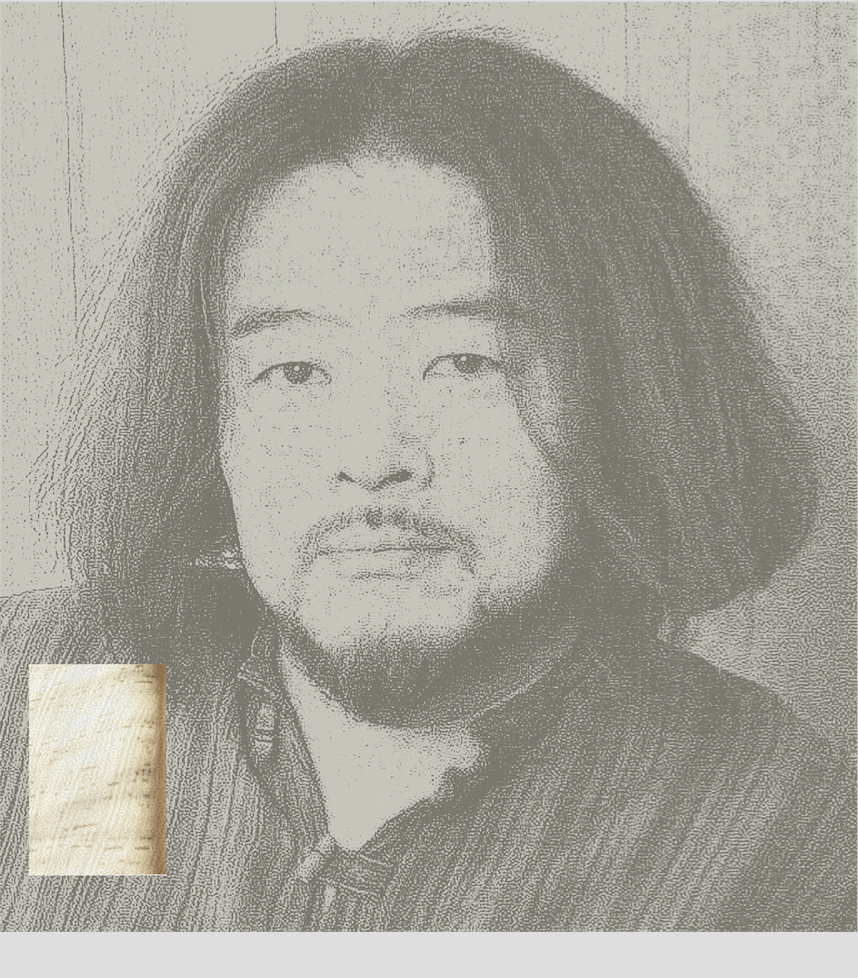
- HE XUNTIAN

Telepathy ( 感应 ) is a work for symphony orchestra, composed by He Xuntian in 1987.

== Summary ==
He Xuntian adopted RD Composition in his work Telepathy.

== First performance ==
- Telepathy, He Xuntian Symphony Works Concert 1988.
- 30 November 1988, Beijing Concert Hall, Beijing.
- China National Symphony Orchestra
