= Moonrise (disambiguation) =

Moonrise is the first appearance of the Moon over the Earth's eastern horizon.

Moonrise may also refer to:

== Books ==
- Moonrise (novel), 2005 novel in the Warriors: The New Prophecy series by Erin Hunter
- Moonrise (Wolfson book), a 2003 nonfiction book by Penny Wolfson about her son, who has muscular dystrophy
- Moonrise, a 1996 Grand Tour novel by Ben Bova
- Moonrise, a Phantom Stallion novel by Terri Farley
- Moonrise, a 2004 Snowfall Trilogy novel by Mitchell Smith
- Moonrise, a 1996 novel by Anne Stuart

== Music ==
- Moonrise (festival), an annual electronic dance music festival in Baltimore, Maryland, US
- Moonrise (Dadawa album) or the title song, 2013
- Moonrise (Day6 album), 2017
- Moonrise (Loona album), 2008
- "Moonrise", a song by Lynsey de Paul from Taste Me... Don't Waste Me, 1974
- "Moonrise", a song by Paul McCartney from Ocean's Kingdom, 2011
- "Moonrise", a song by Guru Randhawa from Man of the Moon, 2022
- Moonrise (Granger Smith album)

== Other uses ==
- MoonRise, a proposed NASA robotic mission to the south pole of the Moon
- Moonrise, Hernandez, New Mexico, a 1941 Ansel Adams photograph
- Moonrise (Stanisław Masłowski), an 1884 painting by Stanisław Masłowski
- Moonrise (film), a 1948 film noir crime film adapted from the 1946 novel by Theodore Strauss
- Moonrise, alternate title for the 1992 children's vampire film, Grampire
- Moonrise (TV series), a 2025 animated series from Netflix
