= Rupa Dance =

- by Xuntian He
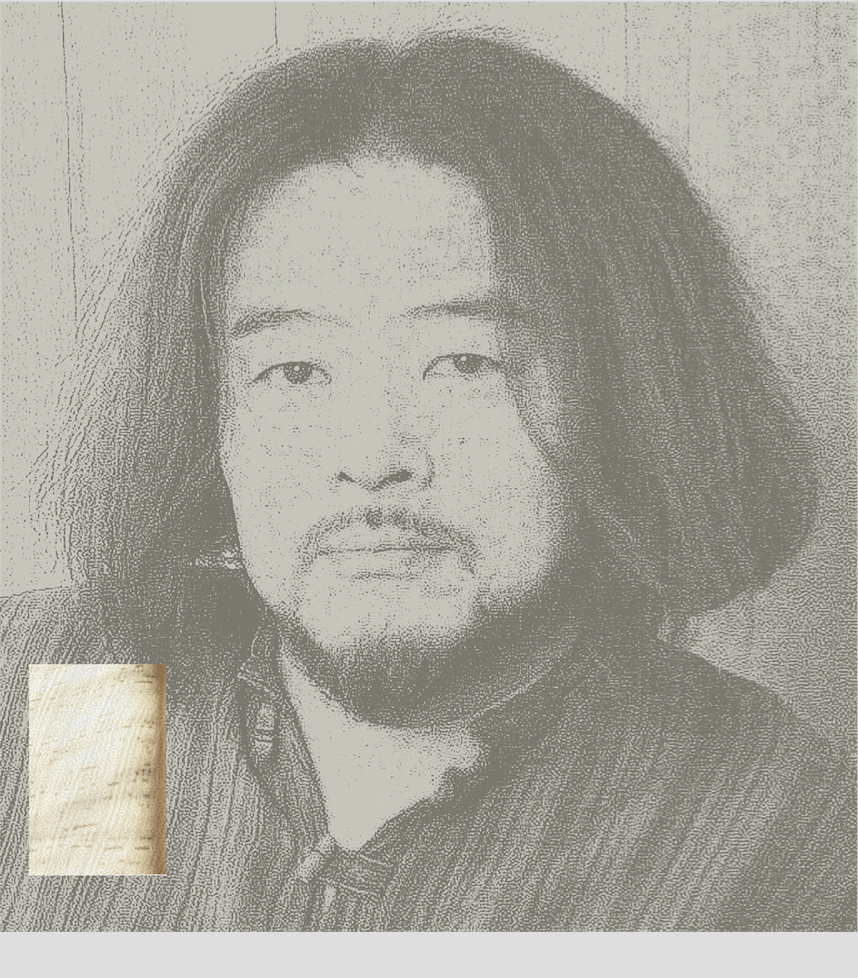
- HE XUNTIAN

Rupa Dance ( 色之舞 ) is a work for piano and symphony orchestra, composed by He Xuntian in 2009.

== Summary ==
Rupa is an ancient Sanskrit word. Rupa Dance (2009) was composed for piano and symphony orchestra. As Sunyata Dance, it is also one of Renyi Metre Series, which means random beats based on one beat can be realized. There is no centre or primary or secondary. At the same time, they are mutual centre, primary and secondary. Pianist Sun Yingdi will show us a new world without start or stop. And the groundbreaking of one beat notation could be a huge challenge for the director, the orchestra and the solo. The texts he created are non-textual and non-syllogistic. The subversion of He's Art is self-evident and undisputed.

== Inspiration ==
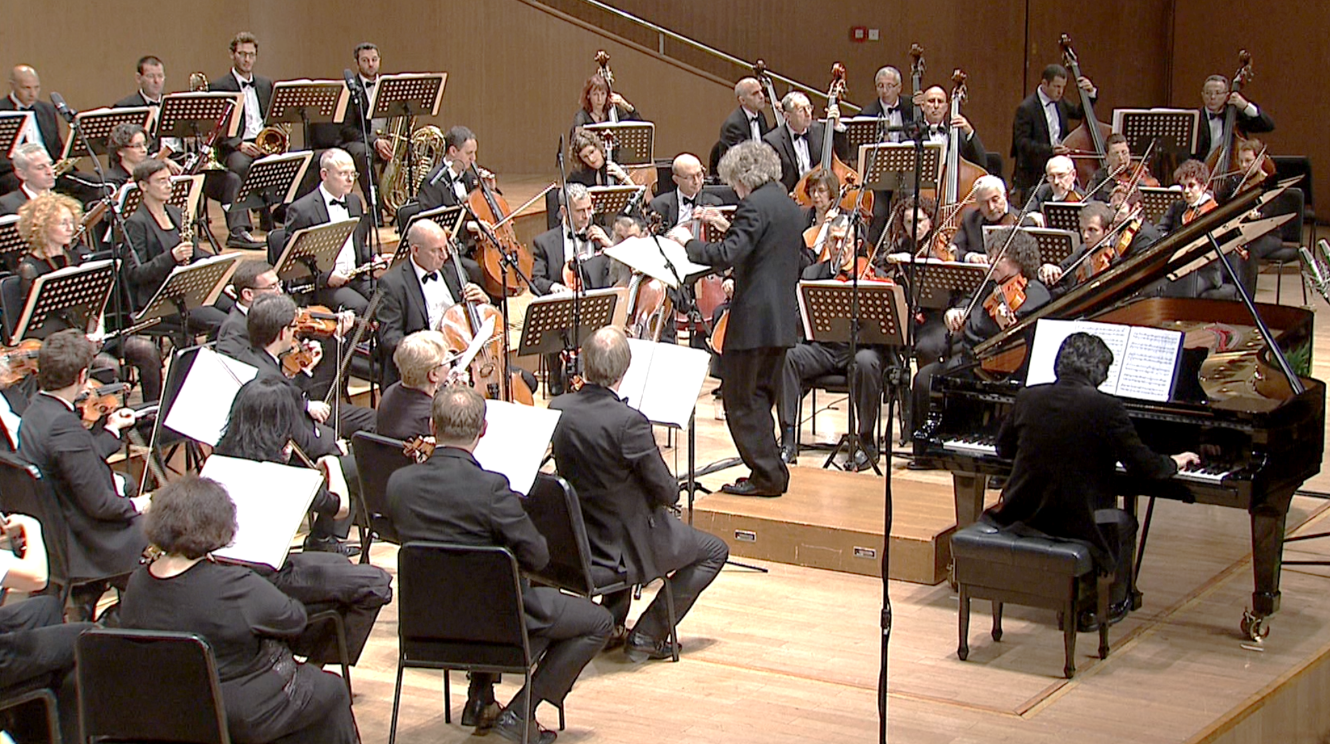
He Xuntian: Rupa Dance, Pianist Sun Yindi and The Israel Symphony Orchestra

Rupa Dance was inspired from Xuntian He's ideology:
Udumbara don't smell like papaver.
Five Nons: Non-Western, non-Eastern, non-academic, non-folk, and non-non.

== First performance ==
8. November 2014 Shanghai, Concert Hall, Oriental Art Center (CN)
Pianist: Sun Yingdi
Dirigent: James Judd
Israel Symphony Orchestra
