= Mystical Scent =

- by Xuntian He
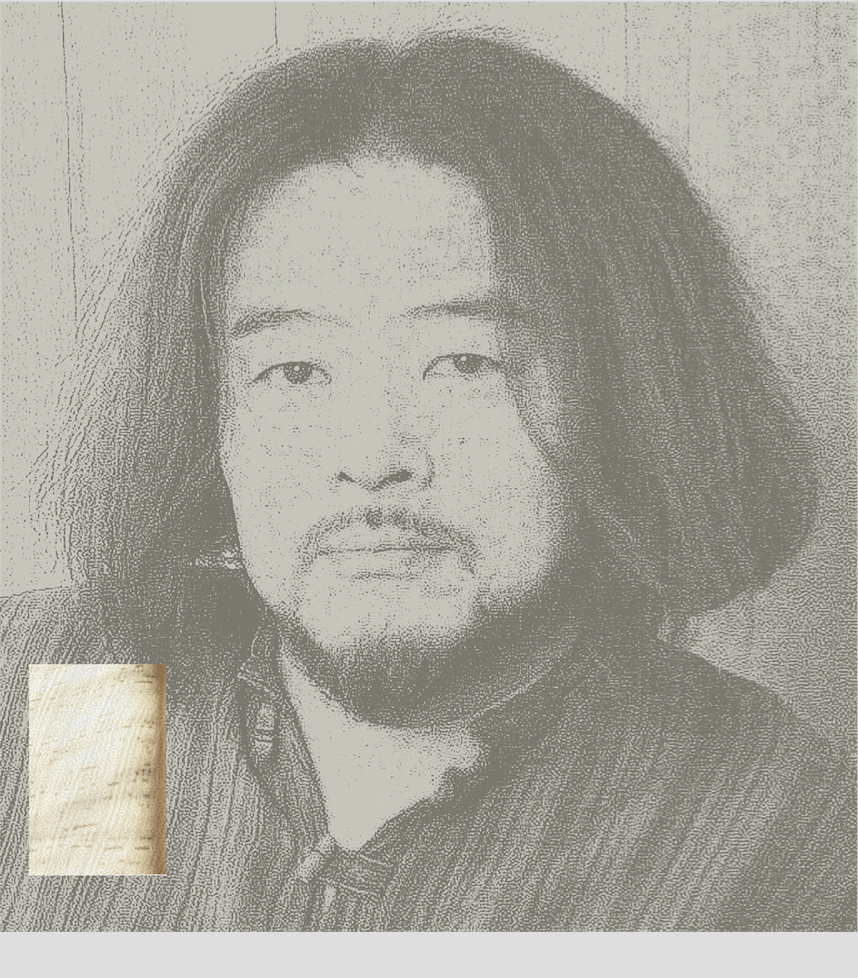
- HE XUNTIAN

Mystical Scent ( 神香 ) is a music work for the original soundtrack of the feature film Prince of Himalayas, composed by He Xuntian in 2007.

== Summary ==
Mystical Scent has eleven movements:

1. Sacred Book 盛典
2. Son of Destiny 命运之子
3. Mystical Scent 神香
4. Wolf-Woman Lake 狼婆湖
5. Tibetan Drama Dance 藏戏舞
6. Lover 恋人
7. Mountain Song 山歌
8. Mystical Scent 神香
9. Journey 征途
10. The Last Tear 最后的眼泪
11. Mystical Scent 神香
