= Four Dreams =

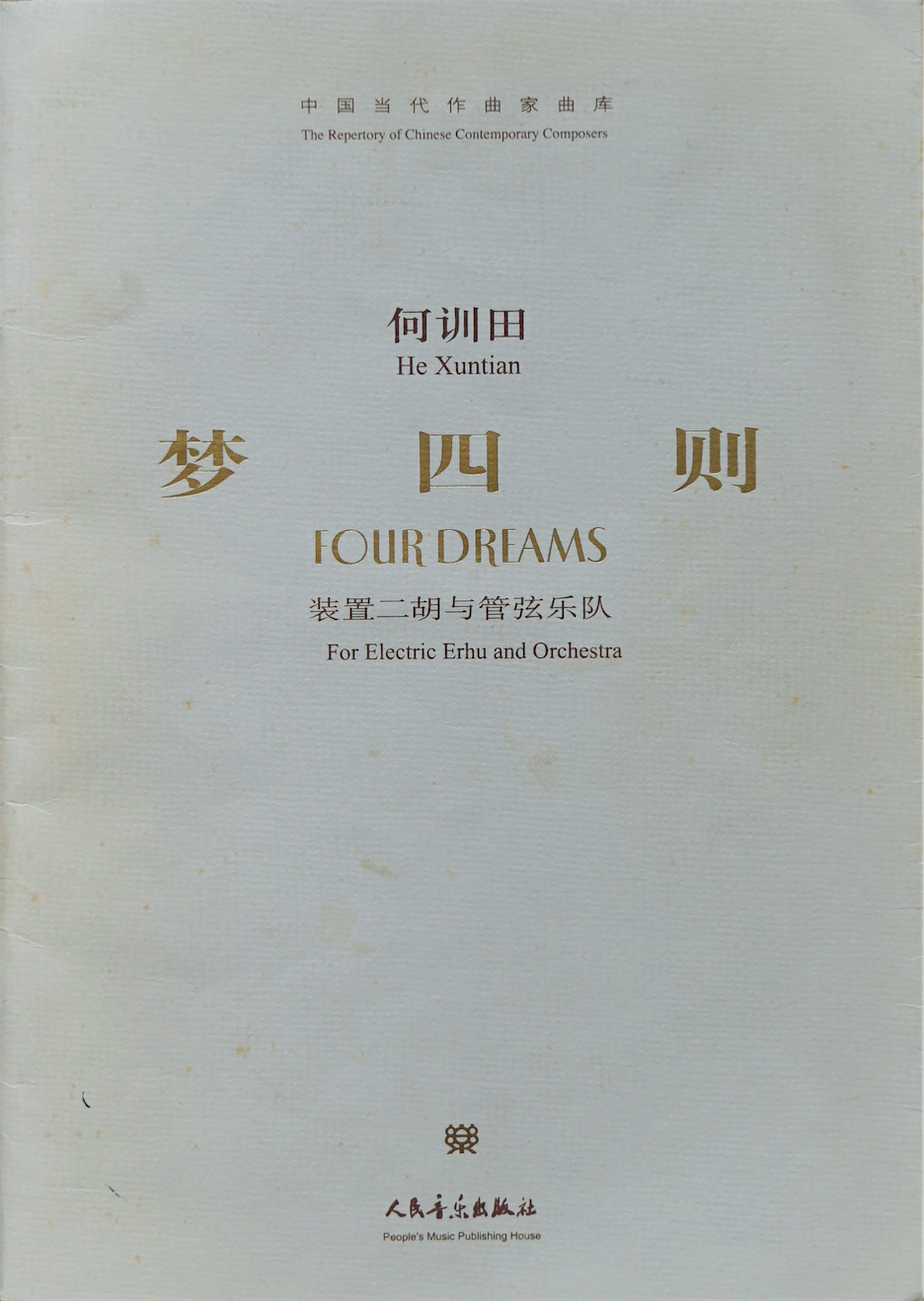
He Xuntian: Four Dreams

Four Dreams ( 梦四则 ) is a work for electric erhu and orchestra, composed by He Xuntian in 1986.

== Introduction ==
In this piece, Erhu is remodeled into an electric one, making the changes in tone extremely close to human voice. Four Dreams is composed with four chapters, which continuously reveal dreams bound with or inside one another. Four Dreams was composed with RD Composition in 1986.

== First performance ==
15 September 1988, Royal Scottish Academy of Music and Drama, Glasgow
BBC Scottish Symphony Orchestra
