= Sister Drum =

阿姐鼓 Sister Drum

Studio album by Dadawa
- Released: 1995
- Genre: New age, pop
- Label: Sire/Elektra Records; 61889

Dadawa chronology
| Yellow Children (1992) | 阿姐鼓; Sister Drum (1995) | Voices from the Sky (1997) |

Sister Drum (Chinese: 阿姐鼓; pinyin: Ā Jiě Gǔ) is the second studio album by Chinese singer Dadawa (music by He Xuntian). The album is heavily influenced by the music of Tibet and is notable for being the first Asian CD to ship over one million copies in China.

Dadawa and He Xuntian travelled to Tibet in 1995 where they made recordings that were later used in the album. Dadawa has said that she has no contact with politics and that she loves Tibetan folk music. A music video was made for the title track.

== Track listing ==
1. 没有阴影的家园 "Home Without Shadow" - 5:52
2. 阿姐鼓 "Sister Drum" - 5:46
3. 天唱 "Sky Burial" - 7:32
4. 笛威辛亢纽威辛亢 (天堂、地狱) "Di Swi Shin Kan, New Wei Shin Kan (Paradise Inferno)" - 4:41
5. 羚羊过山岗 "Crossing the Ridge" - 5:59
6. 卓玛的卓玛 "Zhouma of Zhoumas" - 4:55
7. 转经 "Turning Scripture" - 9:05
