= Clouds Rising Into the Lotus Flowers =

Chant for soprano and orchestra, composed by He Xuntian, 2008

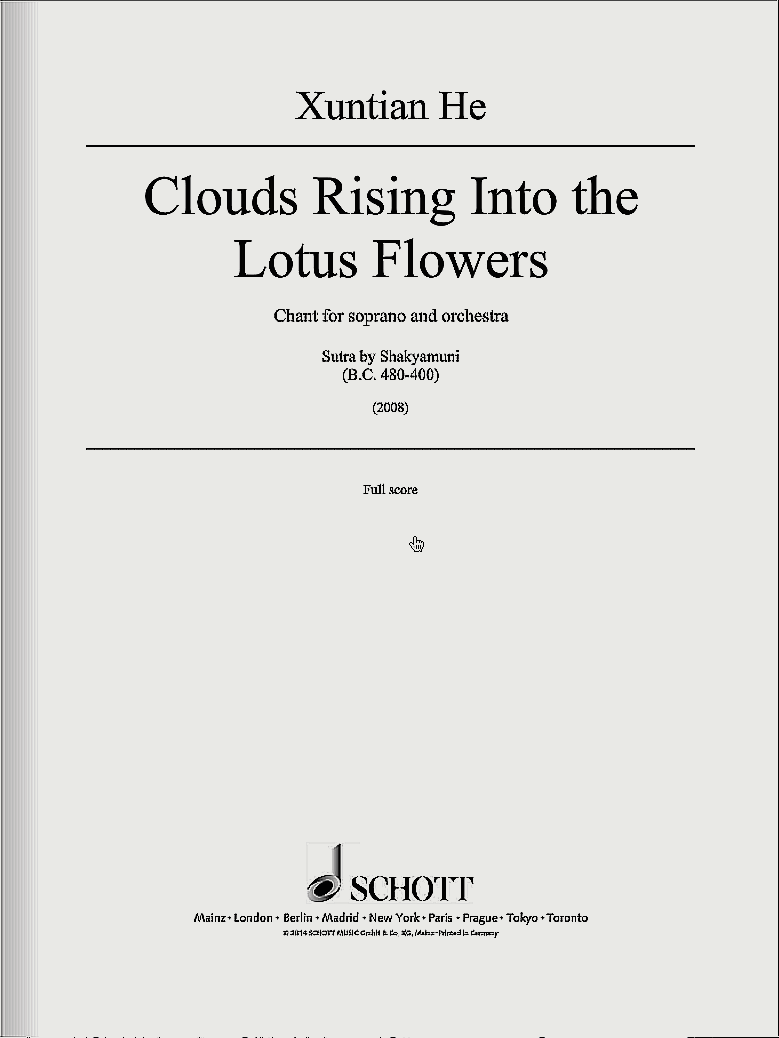
He Xuntian: Clouds Rising Into the Lotus Flowers

Clouds Rising Into the Lotus Flowers ( 云上莲花 ) is a chant for soprano and orchestra, composed by He Xuntian in 2008.

== Inspiration ==
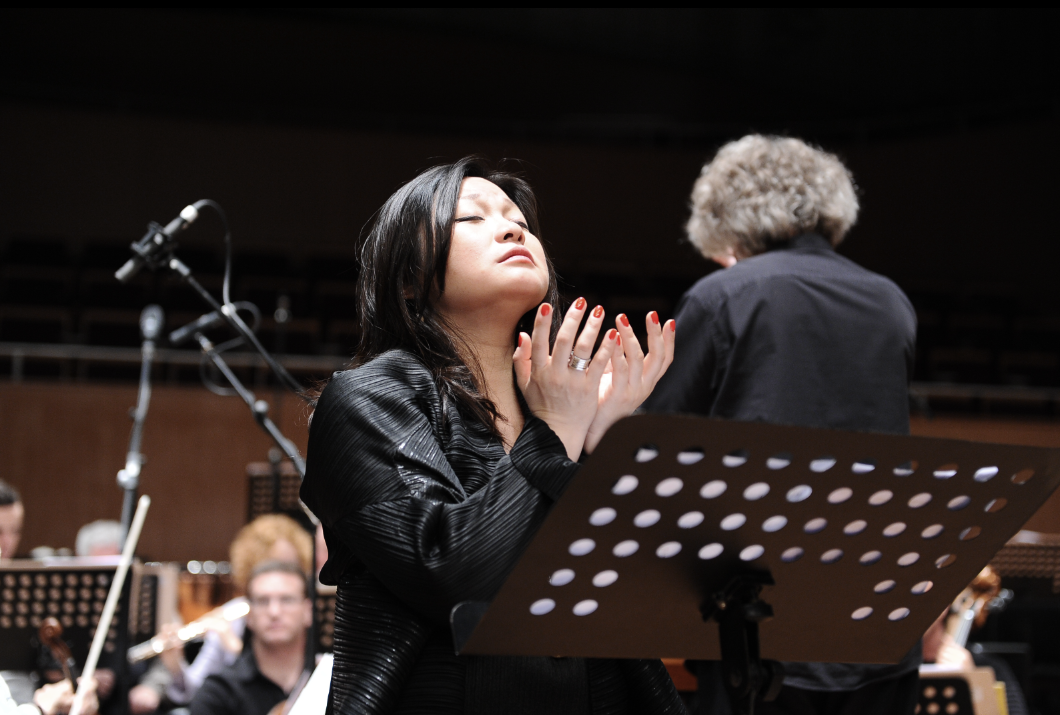
He Xuntian: Clouds Rising Into the Lotus Flowers, Soprano Huang Ying and The Israel Symphony Orchestra

Clouds Rising Into the Lotus Flowers was inspired from Shakyamuni's sutra:

na mo a mi da ba ya
da ta ga da ya
da d ya ta
a mi li dou ba wei
a mi li da xi dan ba wei
a mi li da wei ge lan di
a mi li da wei ge lan da ga mi ni
ga ga na gei di ga li
si wa ha

== First performance ==
Clouds Rising Into the Lotus Flowers

- Soprano: Huang Ying
- Dirigent: James Judd
- Orchester: Israel Symphony Orchestra
- 8 November 2014, Shanghai, Concert Hall, Oriental Art Center
