= Scent Dance III =

- by Xuntian He
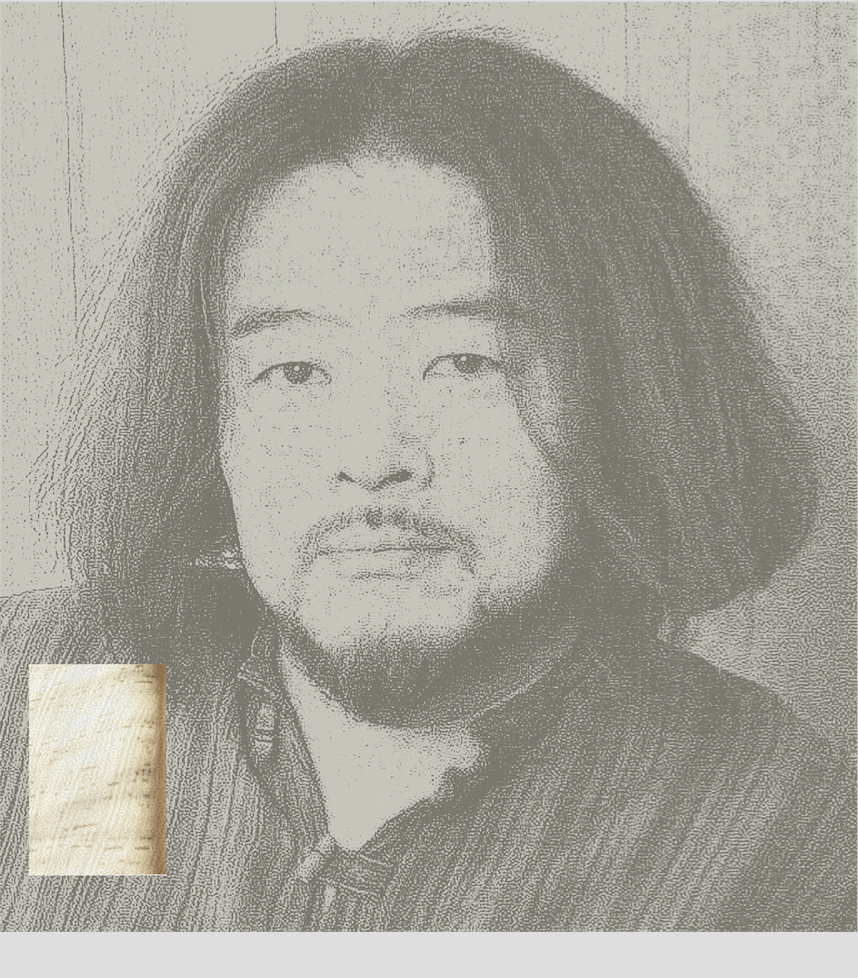
- HE XUNTIAN

Scent Dance III ( 香之舞 III ) is a work for string quartet, composed by He Xuntian in 2011.

== Summary ==
Scent Dance III was commissioned for the 2011 4th Beijing International Music Competition - String quartet Competition and included in the list of required repertoire.

== Inspiration ==
Scent Dance III was inspired from Xuntian He’s poem Passing By the Earth (1999).
