= Paramita (He Xuntian) =

- by Xuntian He
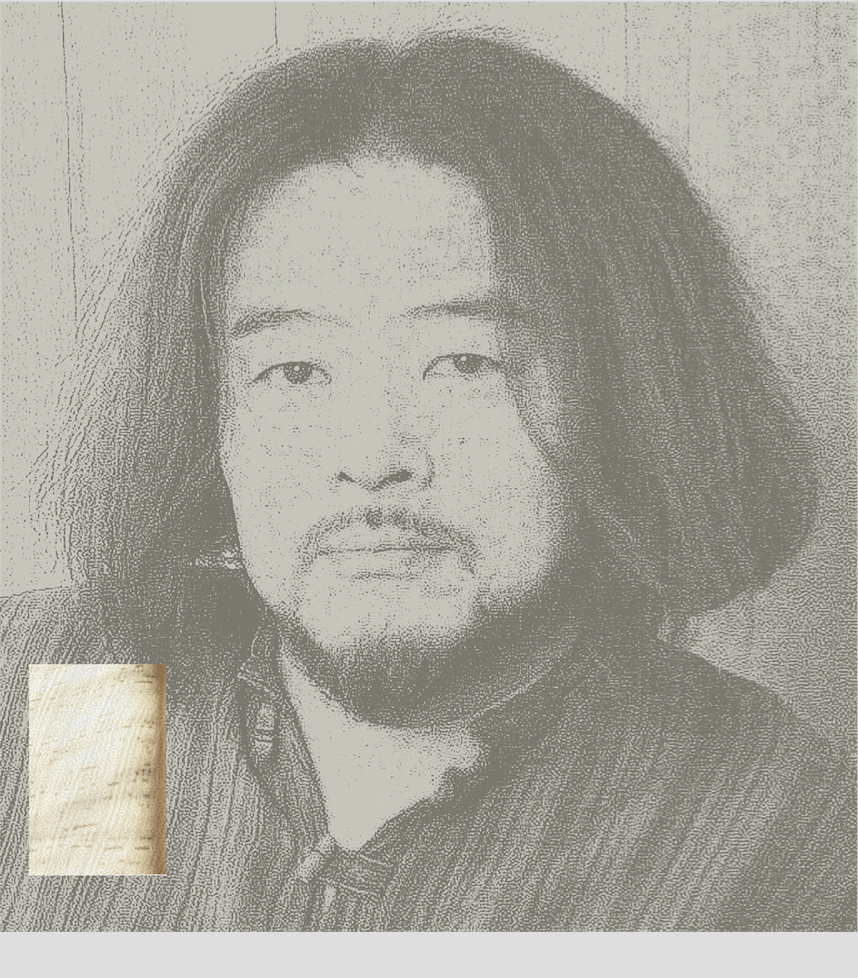
- HE XUNTIAN

Paramita (He Xuntian) ( 波罗密多 ) is a work for music ceremony composed by He Xuntian. 1300 performers made a debut of it on Oct.25th 2002 at Leifeng Pagoda in Hangzhou, China.

== Summary ==
Paramita has ten movements:

1. Cloud Bells 云钟
2. Paramita 波罗密多
3. Song of the Enlightenment 阿耨多罗三藐三菩提
4. Song of Pipa 琵琶行
5. Monks 群僧
6. Heart Sutra 般若心经
7. Earth Drums 尘鼓
8. Dance of the White Snake 白蛇舞
9. Spring Song 春歌
10. Moons upon a Thousand River 千江月
