= Phonism I =

1989 composition by He Xuntian

- by Xuntian He
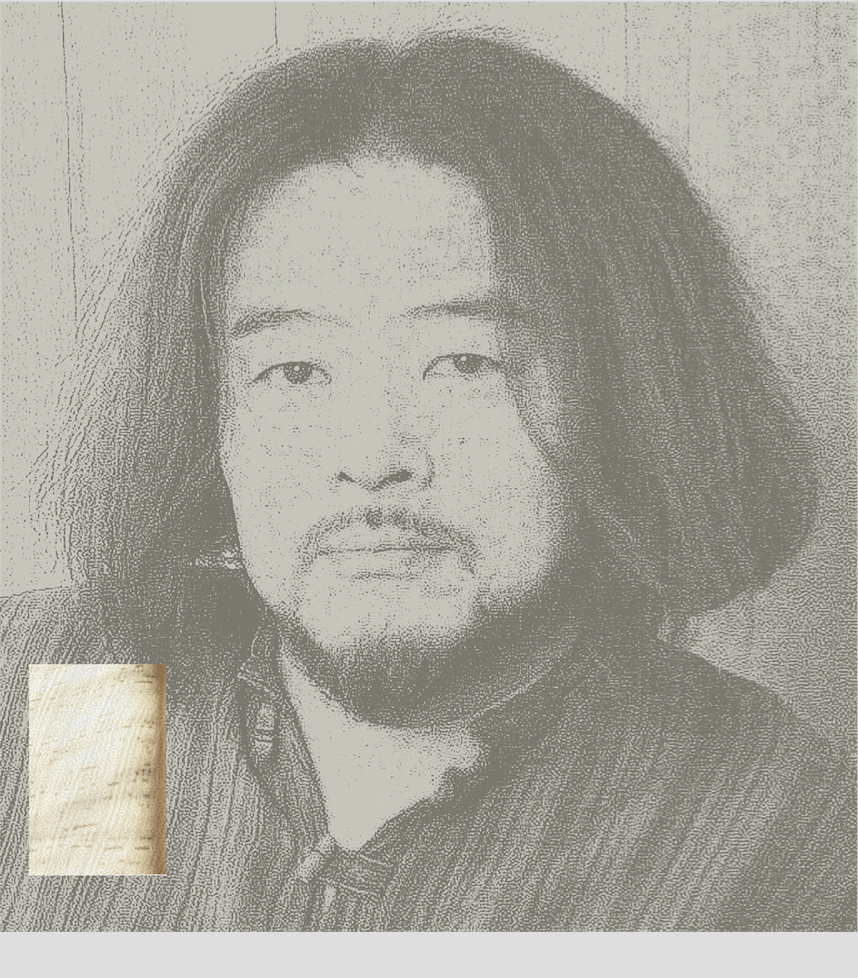
- HE XUNTIAN

Phonism I ( 幻听 I ) is a work for 10 performers, composed by He Xuntian in 1989.

== Summary ==
He Xuntian adopted RD Composition and Theory of Musical Dimension in his work Phonism I.

== First performance ==
It was first performed by Netherlands Nieow Ensemble on 2 April 1991 in Paradiso.
