= Warrior Lanling =

- by Xuntian He
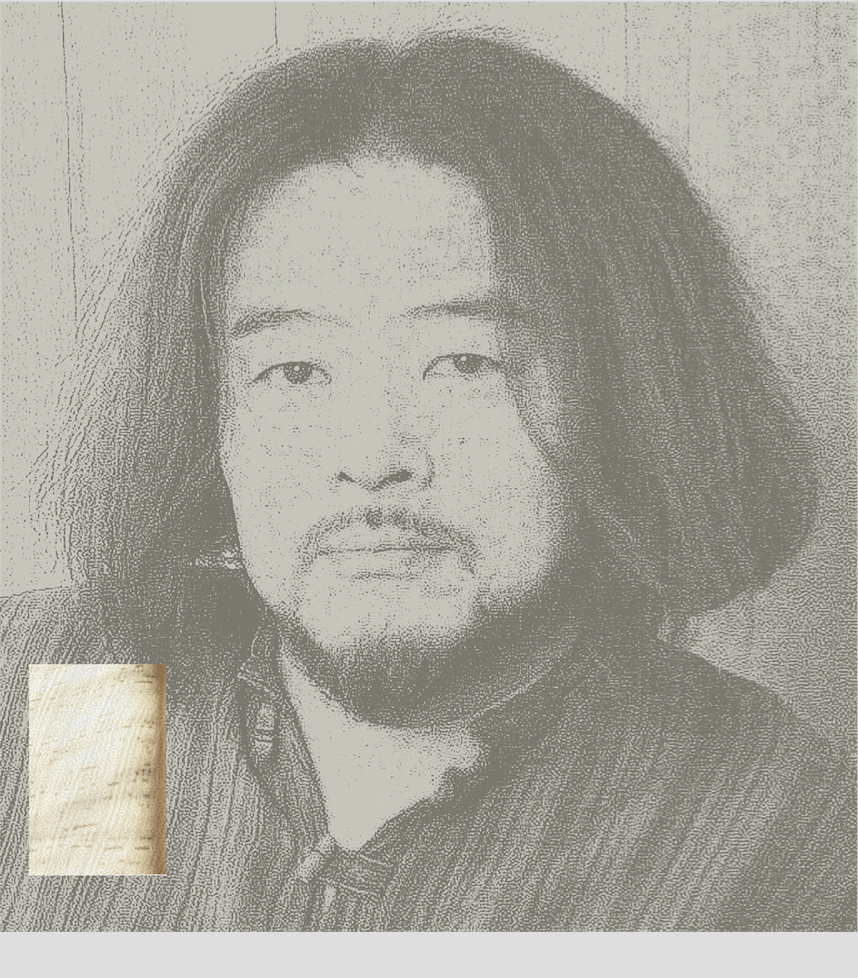
- HE XUNTIAN

Warrior Lanling ( 兰陵王 ) is a musical work for the original soundtrack of Warrior Lanling, composed by He Xuntian in 1995.

== Summary ==
Warrior Lanling has eight movements:

1. Ancient Echo 远古的回声
2. Beautiful Phoenix Tribe 美丽的鳯雀部落
3. Dance of Reproduction 生殖舞
4. Lanling and Mask 兰陵与面具
5. Dance of Black Hair 黑发舞
6. Divine Tree 神树
7. Blood Sacrifice 血祭
8. Mother’s Song 母亲的歌
