= Tathagata (He Xuntian) =

- by Xuntian He
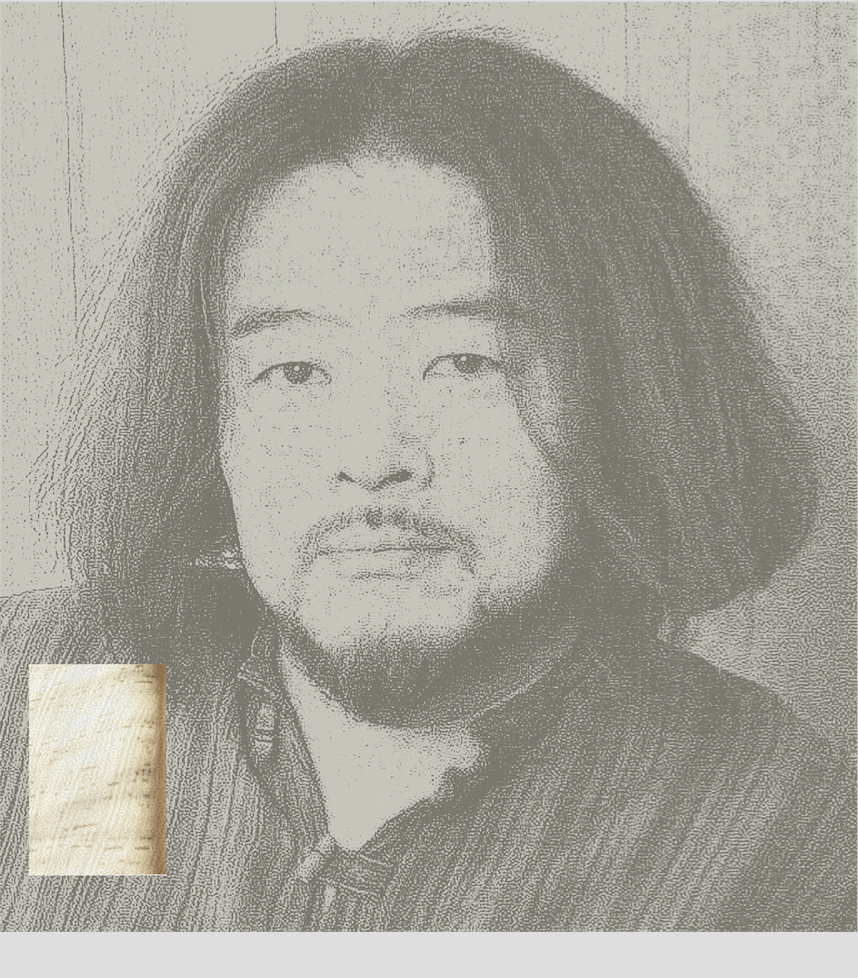
- HE XUNTIAN

Tathagata (He Xuntian) (如来如去; rú lái rú qù) is a music work for Music Ceremony: Eulogy of Lingshan Lucky, composed by He Xuntian.

== Summary ==
Tathagata has eight movements:

1. The Heaven Outside of Heaven (天外天; tiān wài tiān)
2. Tathagata (达塔伽达; dátǎjiādá)
3. Meditation (冥思; míngsī)
4. The Heart of the Void (虚空之心; xūkōng zhī xīn)
5. The Realm of Forms (色界; sè jiè)
6. The Wind the Trees (树有风; shù yǒu fēng)
7. The Dance of the Four Dharmadhatus (四方之舞; sìfāng zhī wǔ)
8. Tathagata (如来如去; rú lái rú qù)

== First Performance ==
March 29, 2009
Lingshan Buddhist Palace, Wuxi
