= Whirling Peach Blossom =

2015 composition for solo piano by He Xuntian

- by Xuntian He
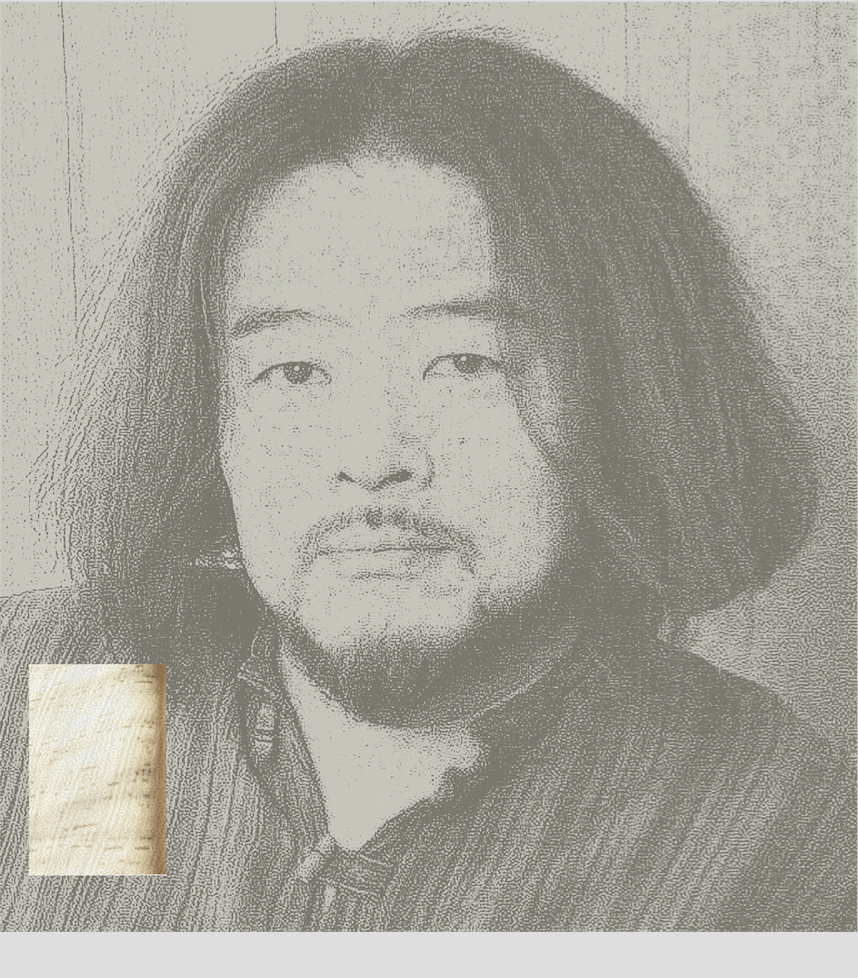
- HE XUNTIAN

Whirling Peach Blossom ( 桃花旋转舞 ) is a work for solo piano, composed by He Xuntian in 2015.

== Summary ==
He Xuntian adopted RD Composition, SS Composition and Theory of Musical Dimension in his work Whirling Peach Blossom.

== Inspiration ==
Whirling Peach Blossom was inspired from Xuntian He’s ideology:
"Whirling into the unborn and the undying".
