= Two of the Earthly Branches =

1983 composition for string quartet by He Xuntian

- by Xuntian He
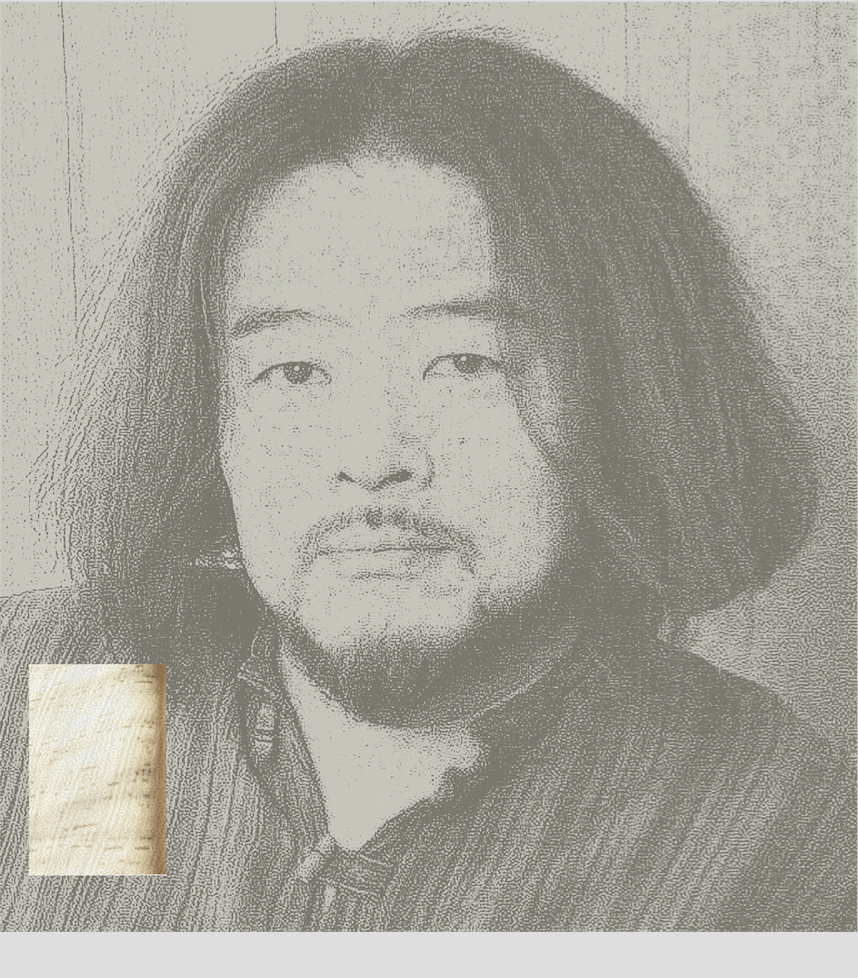
- HE XUNTIAN

Two of the Earthly Branches ( 两个时辰 ) is a work for string quartet, composed by He Xuntian in 1983.

== Summary ==
He Xuntian adopted RD Composition in his work Two of the Earthly Branches.
The work won The 3rd prize of International Carl-Marla-Von-Weber Wettbewerbes Fur Kammermusik 1987 Germany.
