= Ehe Chant =

2008 composition by He Xuntian

- by Xuntian He
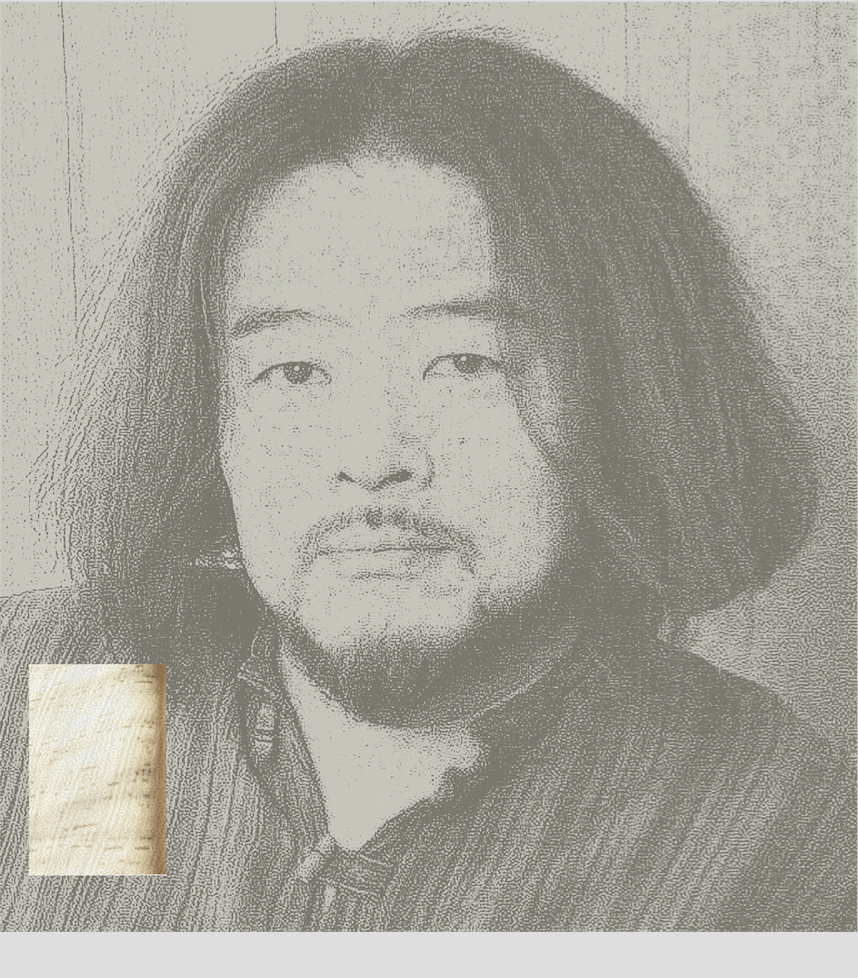
- HE XUNTIAN

Ehe Chant ( 一訸上歌 ) is a work for 32 parts chorus, composed by He Xuntian in 2008.

== Summary ==
Ehe Chant for 32 parts chorus
Chanting a total of 832 lines
Music from dreams…
Music from the place called “Ehe”…
First Music Composition for the Preconscious

== Inspiration ==
He Xuntian wrote about his work:
In a dream, I encountered a heavenly sound;
In response to the dream, Every August 32nd, In the early hours of the morning, 32 chanters gather to chant in harmony;
Chanting a total of 832 lines, Its name was simply Ehe Chant.
