= Cherry Prayer =

Song

- by Xuntian He
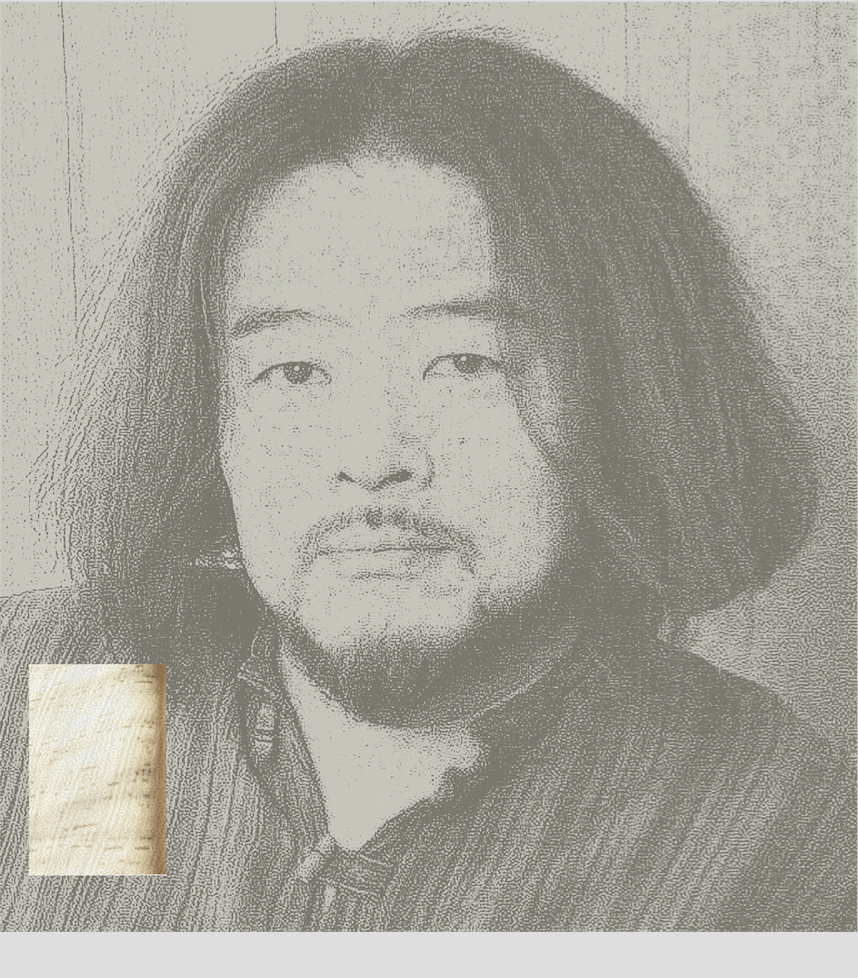
- HE XUNTIAN

Cherry Prayer (樱桃祈祷文) is a work for solo piano, composed by He Xuntian in 2015.

== Summary ==
He Xuntian adopted RD Composition, SS Composition and Five Nons in his work Cherry Prayer.

== Inspiration ==
Cherry Prayer was inspired from Xuntian He’s ideology:
"for all species."
"Non-Western, non-Eastern, non-academic, non-folk, and non-non."
"Believer"
