= Moonrise (Dadawa album) =

月出 Moonrise

Studio album by Dadawa
- Released: December 07, 2013
- Recorded: 2009–2013
- Genre: New age, folk
- Label: CHINGMEICANTO
- Producer: Dadawa

Dadawa chronology
Seven Days (七日谈) (2006)	月出; Moonrise (2013)

Singles from Colours
- 1. "Moonrise" Released: December 2013; 2. "Mountain Top" Released: January 2014

Moonrise (月出) is the fifth studio album by Chinese singer Dadawa (朱哲琴), and is the result of a five-month tour of Chinese ethnic minority regions in 2009, investigating minority music. The album is based on and inspired by the music discovered in China's Guizhou province, Yunnan province, Tibet, Xinjiang and Inner Mongolia.

This is her first album without long-term collaborator, He Xuntian and the first to be self-produced.

The album features music mainly written by Inner Mongolian musician Zulan, with lyrics drawn from Chinese classics such as The Book of Songs and ethnic minority folk songs. One track, "Mountain Top" has lyrics by the 6th Dalai Lama.

Dadawa also has guest vocalists on the album for the first time. These are for the most part members of the ethnic minorities which inspired the music. These are referred to as "Ethnic Music Masters" on the album packaging. The album also features samples from the original minority folk music.

== Track listing ==
1. 月出 ( Moonrise )
2. 山頂 (Mountain Top )
3. 風吹草低 (The Wind-Swept Grass )
4. 情人( Lover)
5. 金冠銀冠 (Golden Crowns And Silver Crowns)
6. 卡龍琴與埃塞蘇拜 (Kalun And Asayesubay)
7. 揭諦揭諦 (Gaté Gaté)
8. 七月 (July)
9. 今生 (In This Life )
10. 來彈琴 來跳舞 來唱歌 (To Play To Dance To Sing)

The deluxe version of the album includes a second CD containing 24 recordings of the ethnic minority music which inspired the album.
