= Images in Sound (He Xuntian) =

- by Xuntian He
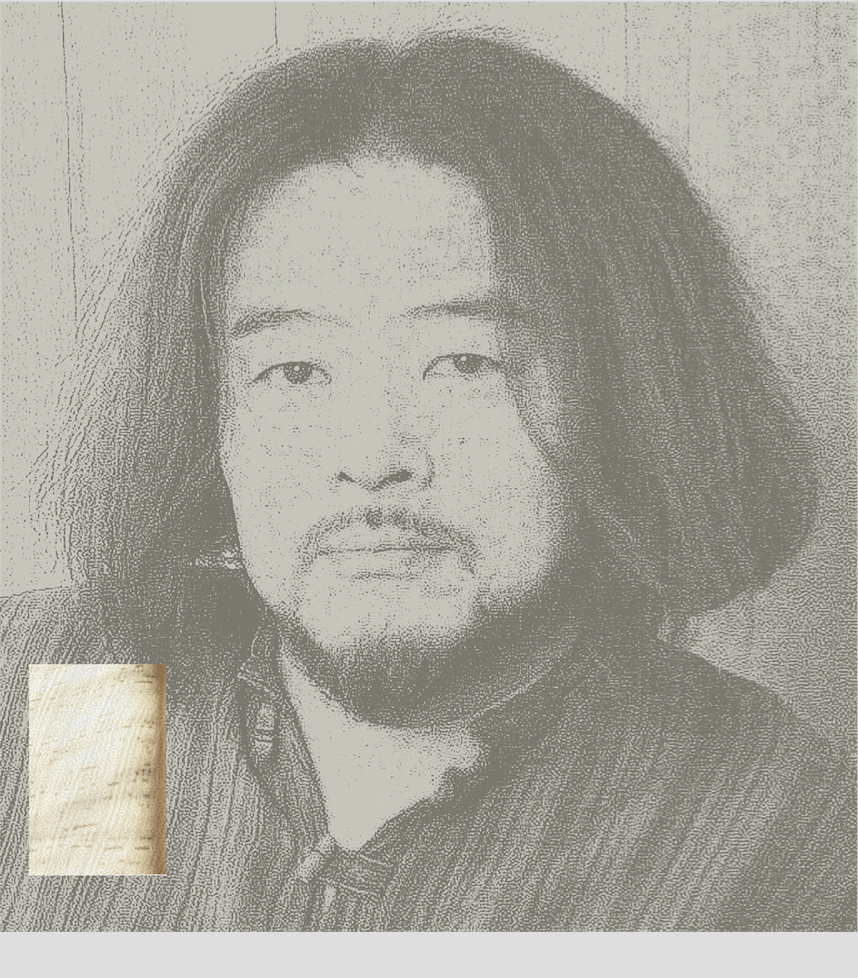
- HE XUNTIAN

Images in Sound ( 声音图案 ) is a piece for conventional and unconventional musical instruments, composed by He Xuntian in 1997–2003.

== Response ==
Images in Sound has been described as primordial music for all species, and humanity's first gift of sound to all species.

== Summary ==
The work has seven movements:

1. MiLi Pattern
2. FuSe Pattern
3. MiYi Pattern
4. FuXiang Pattern
5. MiGuo Pattern
6. FuYi Pattern
7. MiFu Pattern

== Inspiration ==
Images in Sound was inspired by Xuntian He's ideology:

Five Nons: Non-Western, non-Eastern, non-academic, non-folk, and non-non.

Makes no distinction between ancient and modern;
No distinction between north, south, east and west;
No distinction between above and below, left and right;
No distinction between primary and secondary positions;
No distinction between beginning and end.
