= Pipa Pattern =

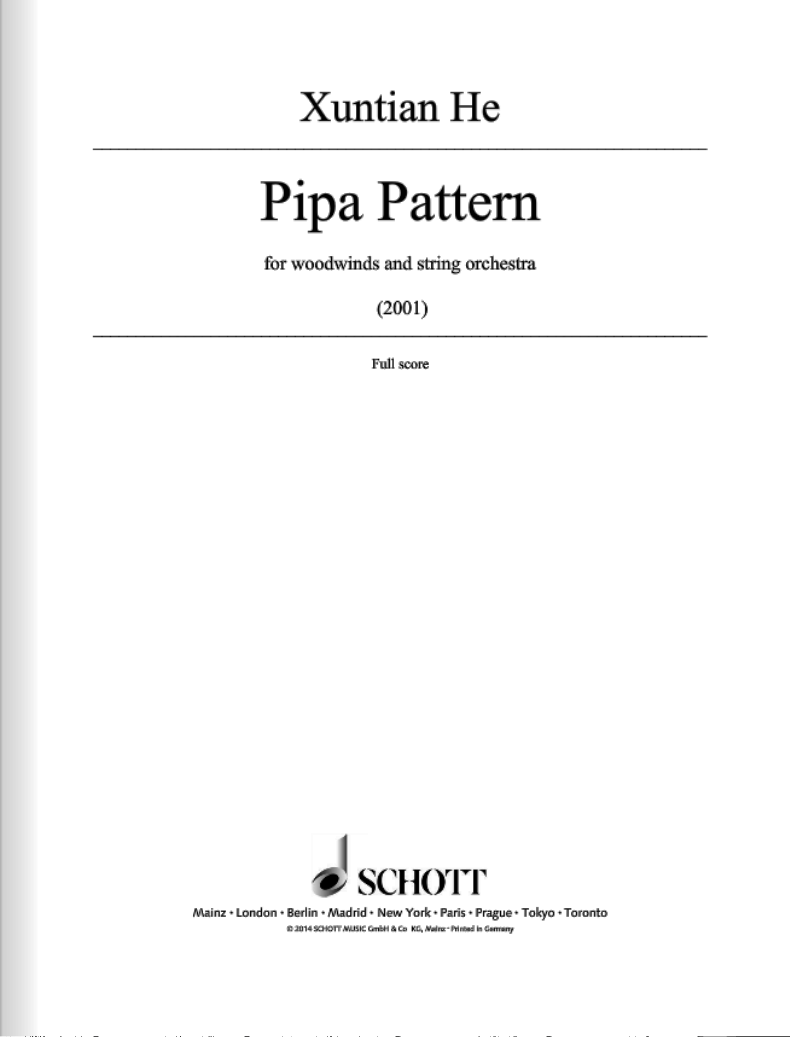
He Xuntian: Pipa Pattern

Pipa Pattern ( 琵琶图 ) is a work for string orchestra and woodwinds, composed by He Xuntian in 2001.

== Summary ==
Pipa Pattern (2001) was written especially for string orchestra and woodwind and it shows the sincere pursuit from composer of one performing skill, which expresses the utterly simple rhythm with unitary performing skill from beginning to the end. This works also reveals the composer’s deep feeling to oriental culture.

== Inspiration ==
Pipa Pattern was inspired from Xuntian He’s poem Satori (1999).

== performance ==
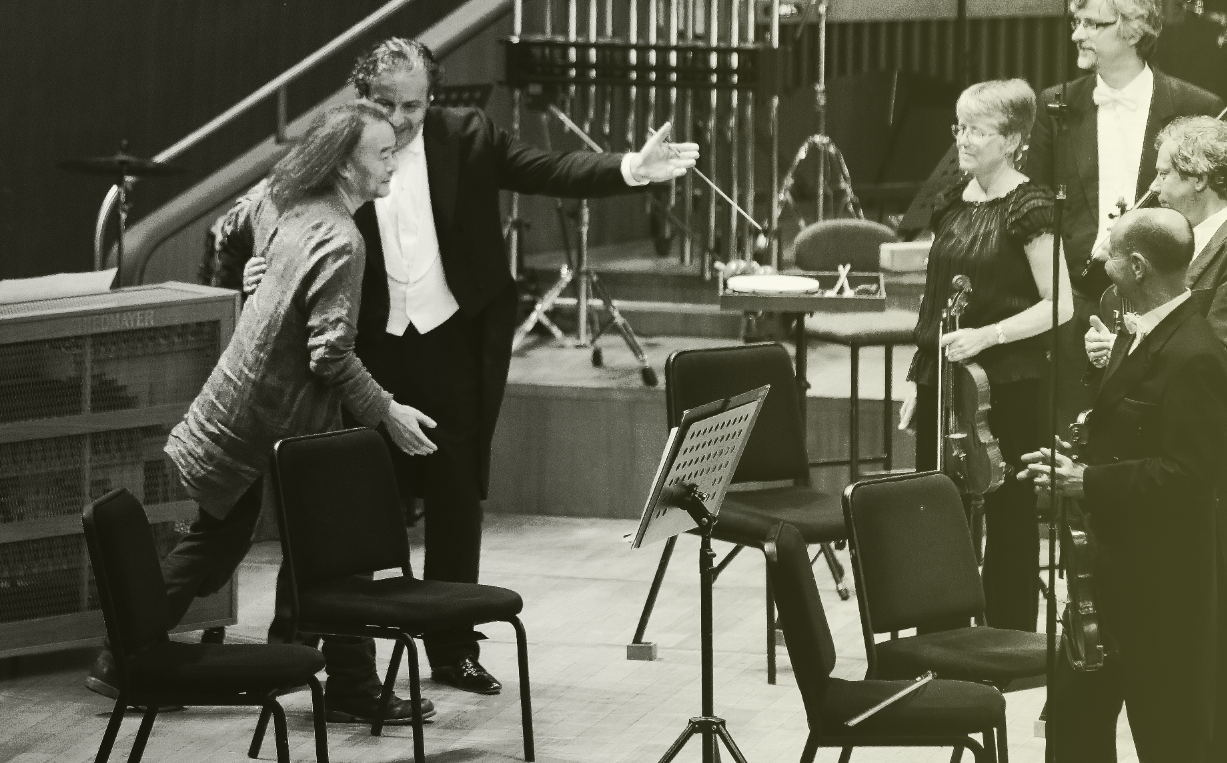
He Xuntian & Juanjo Mena, BBC Philharmonic

Pipa Pattern
Dirigent: Juanjo Mena
Orchestra: BBC Philharmonic Orchestra
25. October 2015 Shanghai, Concert Hall, Oriental Art Center

Pipa Pattern, He Xuntian Works Concert
Dirigent: James Judd
Orchestra: Israel Symphony Orchestra
8. November 2014 Shanghai, Concert Hall, Oriental Art Center
Israel Symphony Orchestra
