= Whirling Papaver =

2014 composition for solo piano by He Xuntian

- by Xuntian He
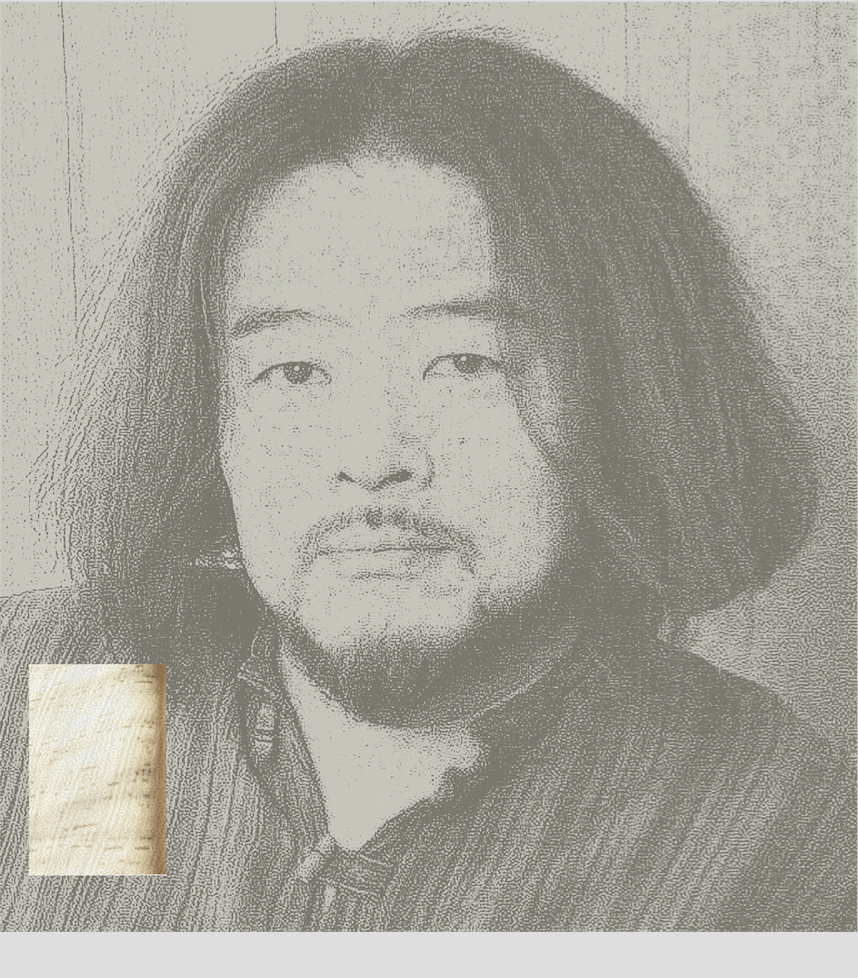
- HE XUNTIAN

Whirling Papaver ( 米囊旋转舞 ) is a work for solo piano, composed by He Xuntian in 2014.

== Summary ==
He Xuntian adopted RD Composition, SS Composition and Five Nons in his work Whirling Papaver.

== Inspiration ==
Whirling Papaver was inspired from Xuntian He’s poem Flown Away (1999).
