= Scent Dance IV =

Piano melody

- by Xuntian He
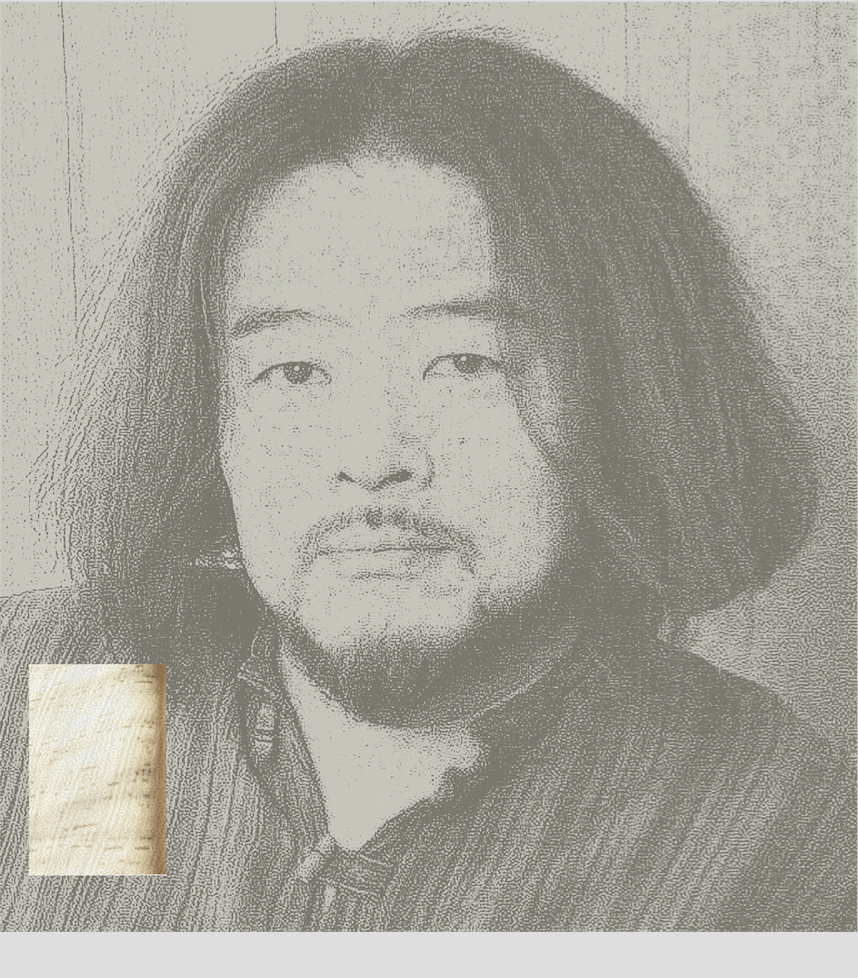
- HE XUNTIAN

Scent Dance IV ( 香之舞 IV ) is a work for solo piano, composed by He Xuntian in 2012.

== Summary ==
He Xuntian adopted RD Composition and SS Composition in his work Scent Dance IV.

== Inspiration ==
Scent Dance IV was inspired from Xuntian He's ideology:
Udumbara don't smell like papaver.
Five Nons: Non-Western, non-Eastern, non-academic, non-folk, and non-non.
