= Scent Dance II =

Composition by He Xuntian for solo violoncello

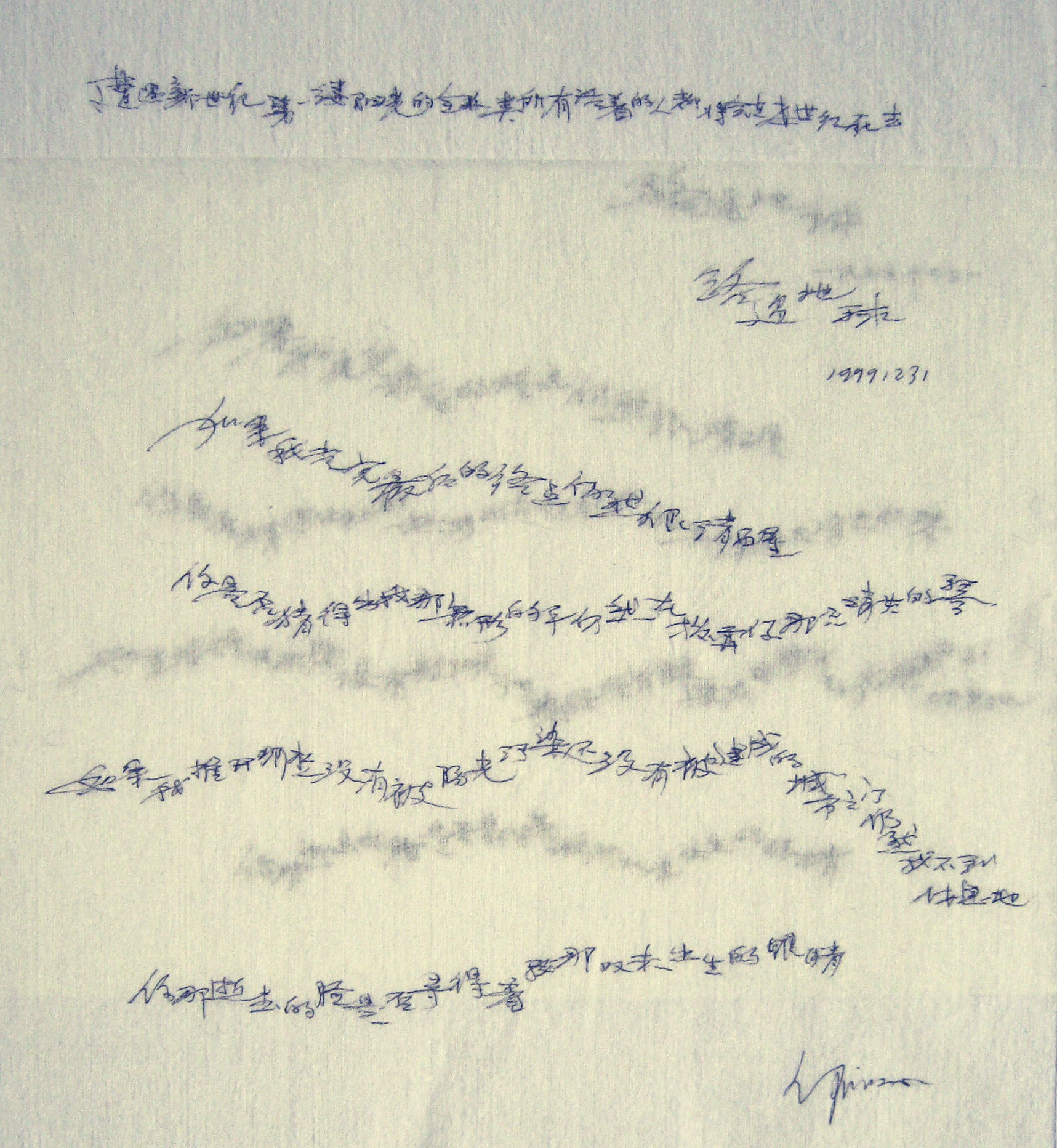
Scent Dance II was inspired from Xuntian He’s poem Passing By the Earth (1999).

Scent Dance II ( 香之舞 II ) is a work for solo violoncello, composed by He Xuntian in 2010.

== Summary ==
Scent Dance II was commissioned for the 2010 3rd Beijing International Music Competition - Violoncello Competition and included in the list of required repertoire.

== Inspiration ==
Scent Dance II was inspired from Xuntian He’s poem Passing By the Earth (1999).
