= Scent Dance I =

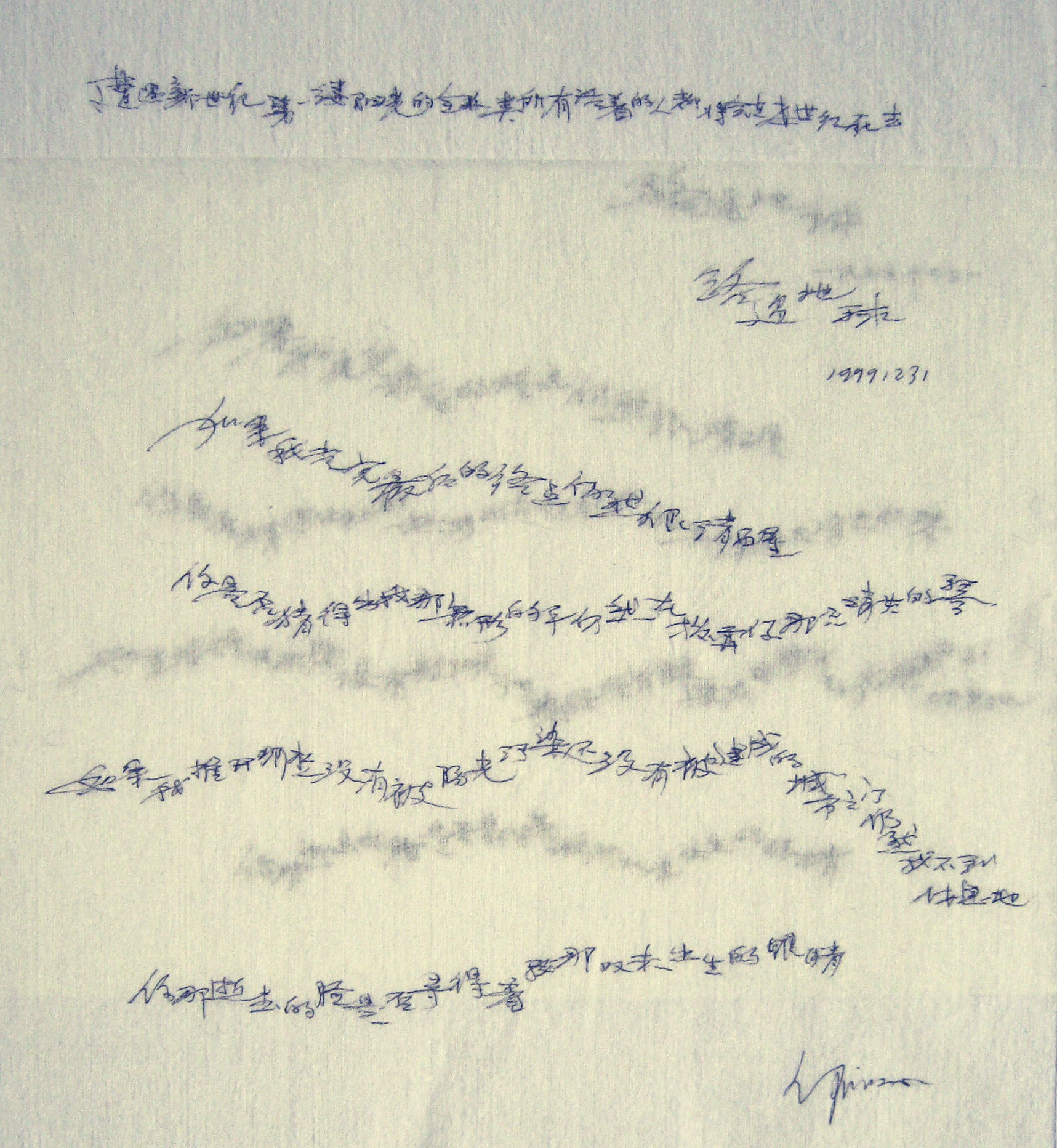
Scent Dance I was inspired from Xuntian He’s poem Passing By the Earth (1999).

Scent Dance I ( 香之舞 I ) is a work for solo clarinet, composed by He Xuntian in 2009.

== Summary ==
Scent Dance I was commissioned for the 2009 2nd Beijing International Music Competition – Clarinet Competition and included in the list of required repertoire.

== Inspiration ==
Scent Dance I was inspired from Xuntian He’s poem Passing By the Earth (1999).
