= He Xuntian =

Chinese composer and professor (born 1952)

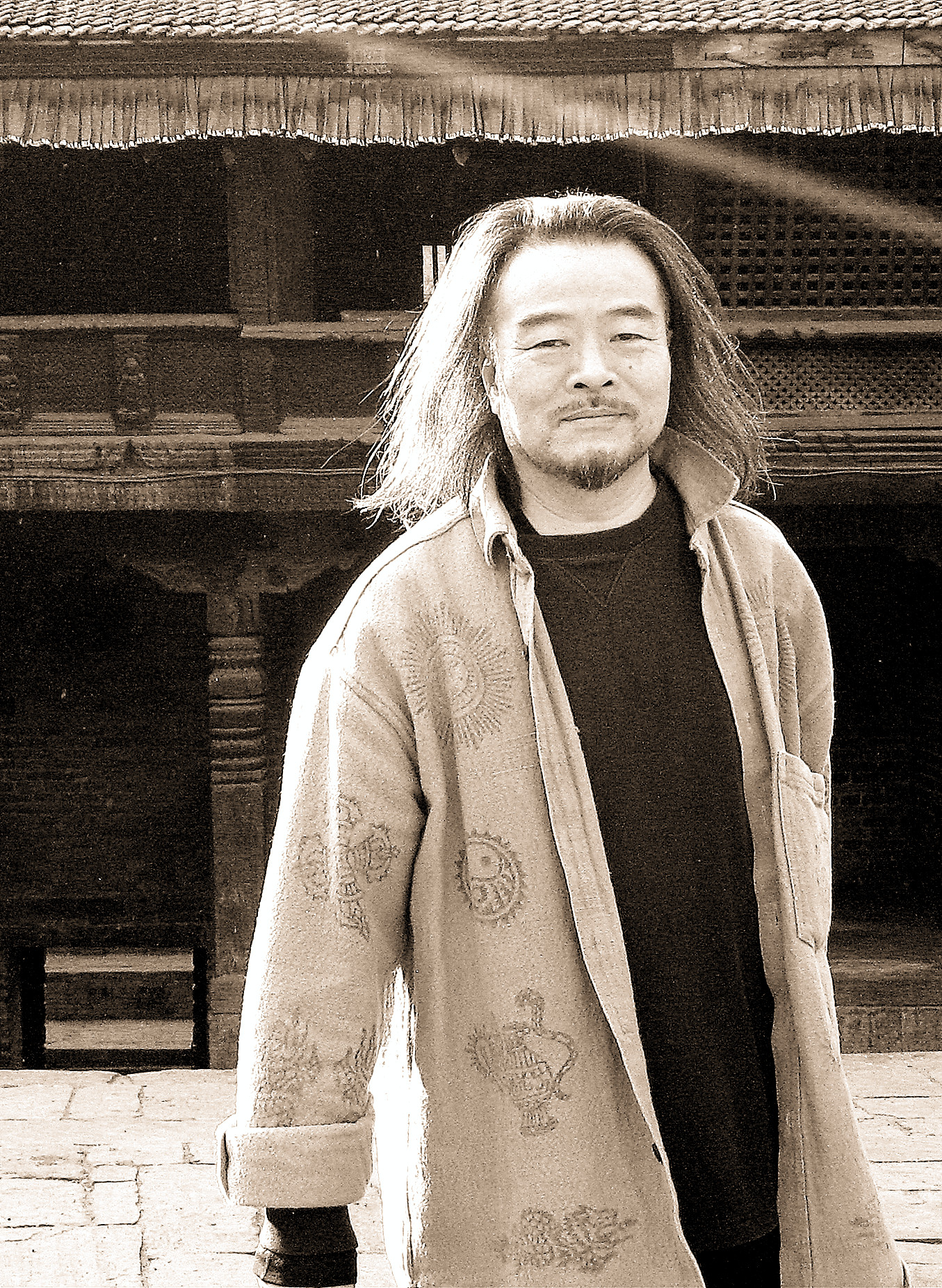
He Xuntian in 2009

He Xuntian (simplified Chinese: 何训田; traditional Chinese: 何訓田; pinyin: Hé Xùntián; born in 1952 in Suining, Sichuan) is a composer and professor of music composition at the Shanghai Conservatory of Music.

== Biography ==
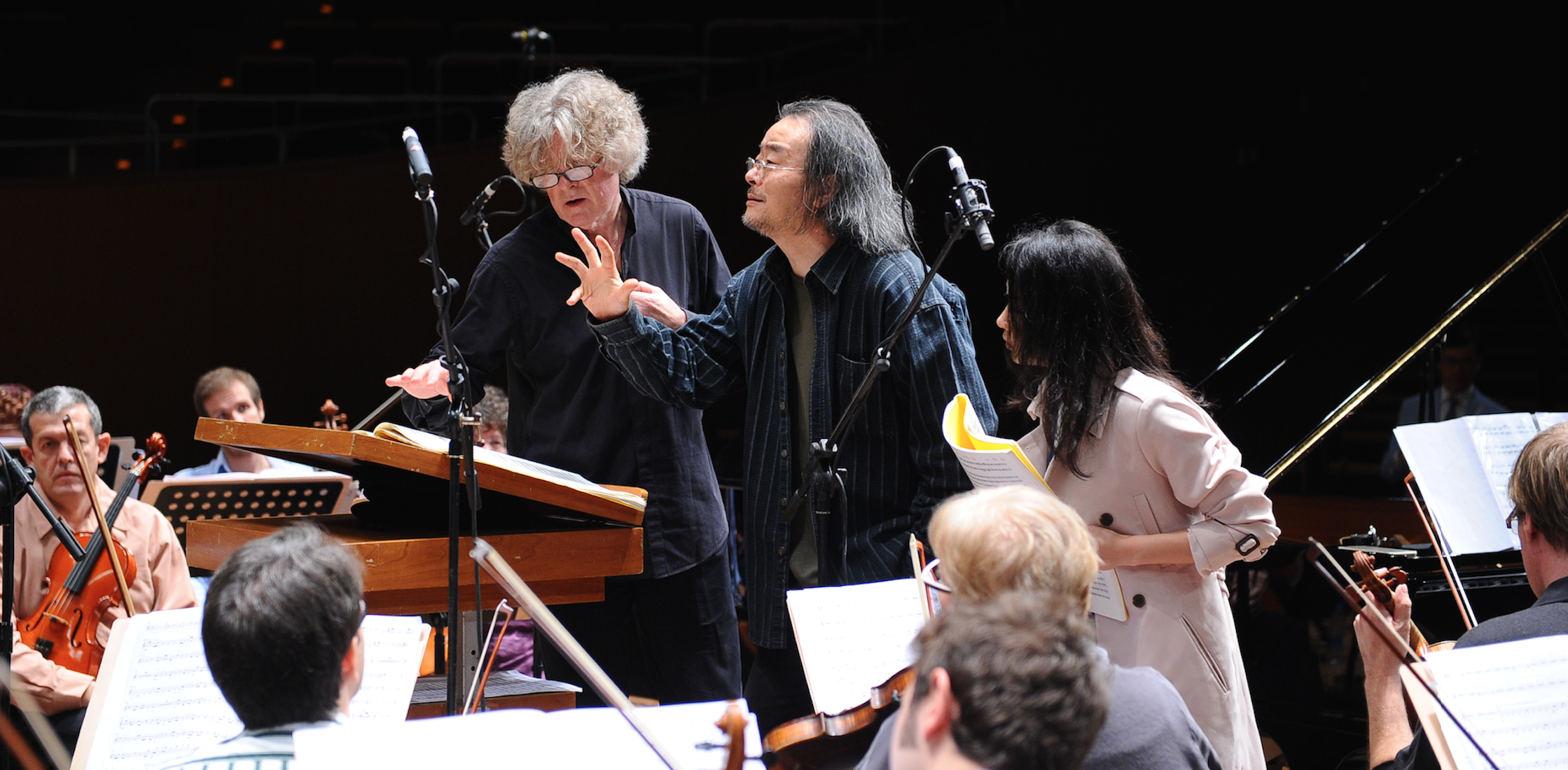
He Xuntian and The Israel Symphony Orchestra

In 1982, he graduated from the Composition Department of the Sichuan Conservatory of Music.
In 1981, he established Three Periods Theory and Theory of Musical Dimension;
In 1982, he developed RD Composition (renyilu duiyingfa Composition), the first compositional method of contemporary China;
In 1993, he established the Five Nons (Non-Western, non-Eastern, non-academic, non-folk, and non-non.);
In 1995, Sister Drum was launched, making him the first Chinese composer to have his record released worldwide. This album, together with a number of others including Voices from the Sky, was released in more than 80 countries with a total sales volume of several million copies;
In 1996, he established SS Composition (stream of structure Composition);
In 1997, he put forward Theory of Interspace;
In 1998, he became director of the Composition & Conducting Department at Shanghai Conservatory of Music.
In 2003, he composed Images in Sound, which was humanity's first gift of primordial music to all species of the natural world;
In 2008, he produced Ehe Chant, the first work of Preconsciousness Music in human history.

He has received 15 international composition awards, including the Outstanding Musical Achievement Award of the International New Music Composer Competition USA 1989–1990; 13 national composition awards, including the First Prize at the Third All-China Music Competition.

His works have been published globally by a number of international publishing companies, including Warner Music Group and Schott Music; and premiered and performed worldwide by many leading orchestras and ensembles, including BBC Scottish Symphony Orchestra and The Israel Symphony Orchestra.

He is known for his compositions done for Dadawa, whose breakthrough was Sister Drum – an international bestseller that sold more than 2 million copies. He has been collecting Tibetan music for twenty years and this has heavily influenced his compositions.

== Awards ==
- International New Music Composer Competition – The Outstanding Musical Achievement Award in USA (1989–1990)
- The Gold Tripod Award in Taiwan (1995)

== Major works ==
=== Theory ===
- Three Periods Theory (三时说; sān shí shuō) (1981)
- Theory of Musical Dimension 音乐維度论 (1981)
- RD Composition RD作曲法 (1982)
- Five Nons 五非说 (1993)
- SS Composition 结构流作曲法 (1996)

=== Poems ===
He Xuntian: Passing By the Earth, 1999
(Every single living human being who encountered the first ray of light of this new century will pass away this century)
If I should make it to the final destination still clear-minded
could you even guess that my intangible hand would still be strumming your lost lute
If I should push open that sunlight-uncontaminated yet-to-be constructed city gate and still can find no place to rest
do you think that your departed face could ever find my unborn pair of eyes

source language:
（遭遇新世纪第一缕阳光的所有活着的人都将会在本世纪死去）
如果我走完最后的终点仍然很清醒
你是否猜得出我那无形的手仍然在拨弄你那只消失的琴
如果我推开那座没有被阳光污染还没有被建成的城市之门仍然找不到休息地
你那逝去的脸是否寻得着我那双未出生的眼睛

何训田:《路过地球》, 1999

- Believer 信徒 (1993)
- Paradise Inferno 天堂地狱 (1993)
- Himalayans 喜玛拉雅人 (1995)
- Ballad of Lhasa 拉萨谣 (1995)
- Seven Drums 七只鼓 (1995)
- Ox Cart 牛车 (1997)
- Flown Away 不翼而飞 (1997)
- Flash of Enlightenment 三托历 (1997)
- In the Setting of the Sun 夕阳西下 (1997)
- Already Song 了歌 (1998)
- Fragrant Nirvana Tree 伽南香娑罗树 (1999)
- Passing By the Earth 路过地球 (1999)
- Mystical Scent 神香 (2006)

=== Chinese orchestra ===
- Dabo River Caprice, Chinese orchestra 达勃河随想曲 (1982)

=== Chamber music ===
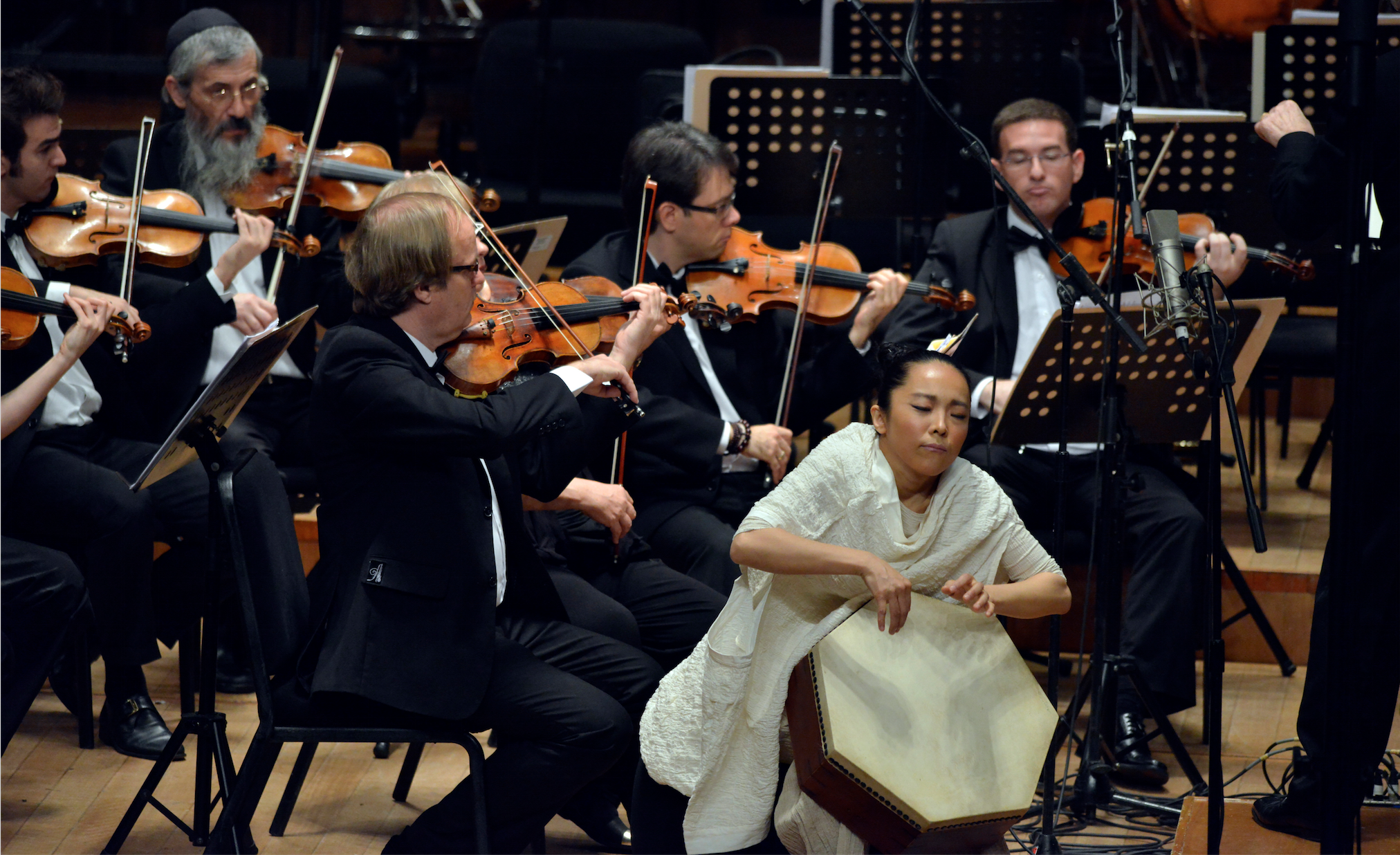
He Xuntian: Whirling Udumbara II He-drum Percussionist Ehesuma and The Israel Symphony Orchestra

- Two of the Earthly Branches, string quartet 两个时辰 (1983)
- Phonism I, 10 performers 幻听 I (1989)
- Phonism II, 9 performers 幻听 II (1990)
- FuSe Pattern (trio), 3 performers 拂色图 (1997)
- Scent Dance I, clarinet solo 香之舞 I (2009)
- Scent Dance II, violoncello solo 香之舞 II (2010)
- Scent Dance III, string quartet 香之舞 III (2011)
- Whirling Udumbara II (trio), viola, violoncello and he-drum 优昙波罗旋转舞 II (2012)
- Whirling Peach Blossom, violin, viola and he-drum 桃花旋转舞 (2015)

=== Piano music ===
- FuSe Pattern 拂色图 (1997)
- Rupa Dance, piano concerto 色之舞 (2009)
- Scent Dance IV 香之舞 IV (2012)
- Whirling Udumbara II 优昙波罗旋转舞 II (2012)
- Whirling Udumbara I 优昙波罗旋转舞 I (2013)
- Whirling Papaver 米囊旋转舞 (2014)
- Whirling Peach Blossom 桃花旋转舞 (2015)
- Cherry Prayer 樱桃祈祷文 (2015)
- Kalavinka Sutra 迦陵频伽经文 (2016)
- Priceless Wealth Is in Thee 无价之宝在你那 (2017)

=== Orchestral music ===
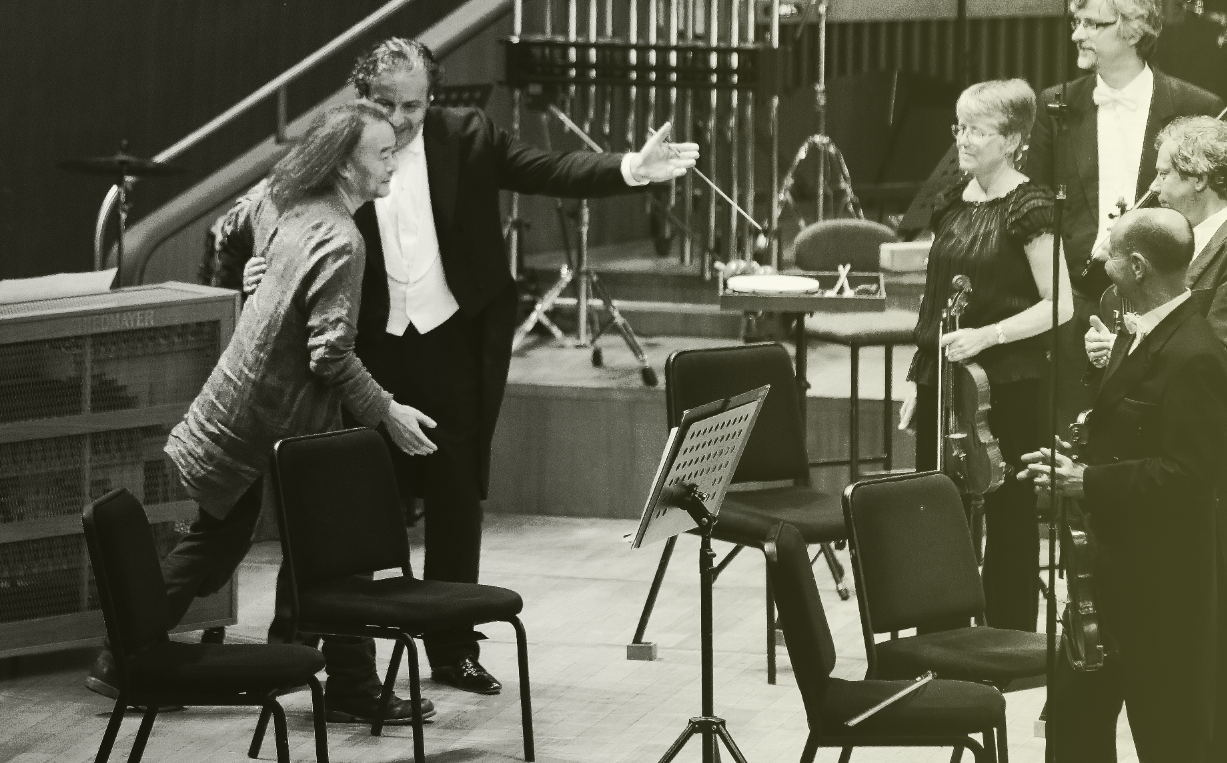
He Xuntian & BBC Philharmonic

- Tonal Patterns, symphony 平仄 (1985)
- Four Dreams, electric erhu and orchestra 梦四则 (1986)
- Telepathy, symphony 感应 (1987)
- Pipa Pattern, string orchestra and woodwind 琵琶图 (2001)
- Clouds Rising Into the Lotus Flowers, soprano and orchestra 云上莲花 (2008)
- Rupa Dance, piano concerto 色之舞 (2009)
- Sunyata Dance, clarinet concerto 空之舞 (2011)
- Whirling Udumbara II, string orchestra and he-drum 优昙波罗旋转舞 II (2012)

=== Unconventional Instruments ===
- Sounds of Nature, unconventional Instruments, seven performers 天籁 (1986)
- Images in Sound, unconventional Instruments 声音图案 (1997–2003)
  - MiLi Pattern 秘厘图
  - FuSe Pattern 拂色图
  - MiYi Pattern 弥泆图
  - FuXiang Pattern 浮香图
  - MiGuo Pattern 密果图
  - FuYi Pattern 弗意图
  - MiFu Pattern 靡符图

=== Preconsciousness music ===
- Ehe Chant, preconsciousness music 一訸上歌 (2008)

=== Film music ===
- Warrior Lanling, film music 兰陵王 (1995)
- Prince of the Himalaya, film music 喜马拉雅王子 (2006)

=== Multimedia music ===
- The Riddler, musical theatre 迷哥 (2001)
- Leifeng Pagoda Music Ceremony 雷峰夕照音乐大典 (2002)
- The Sign, Internet game music 神迹 (2003)
- Eulogy of Lingshan Lucky, music ceremony 灵山吉祥颂 (2009)
- Forever Shanghai, the Shanghai Pavilion at Expo 2010 Shanghai 永远的新天地 (2010)

== Discography ==
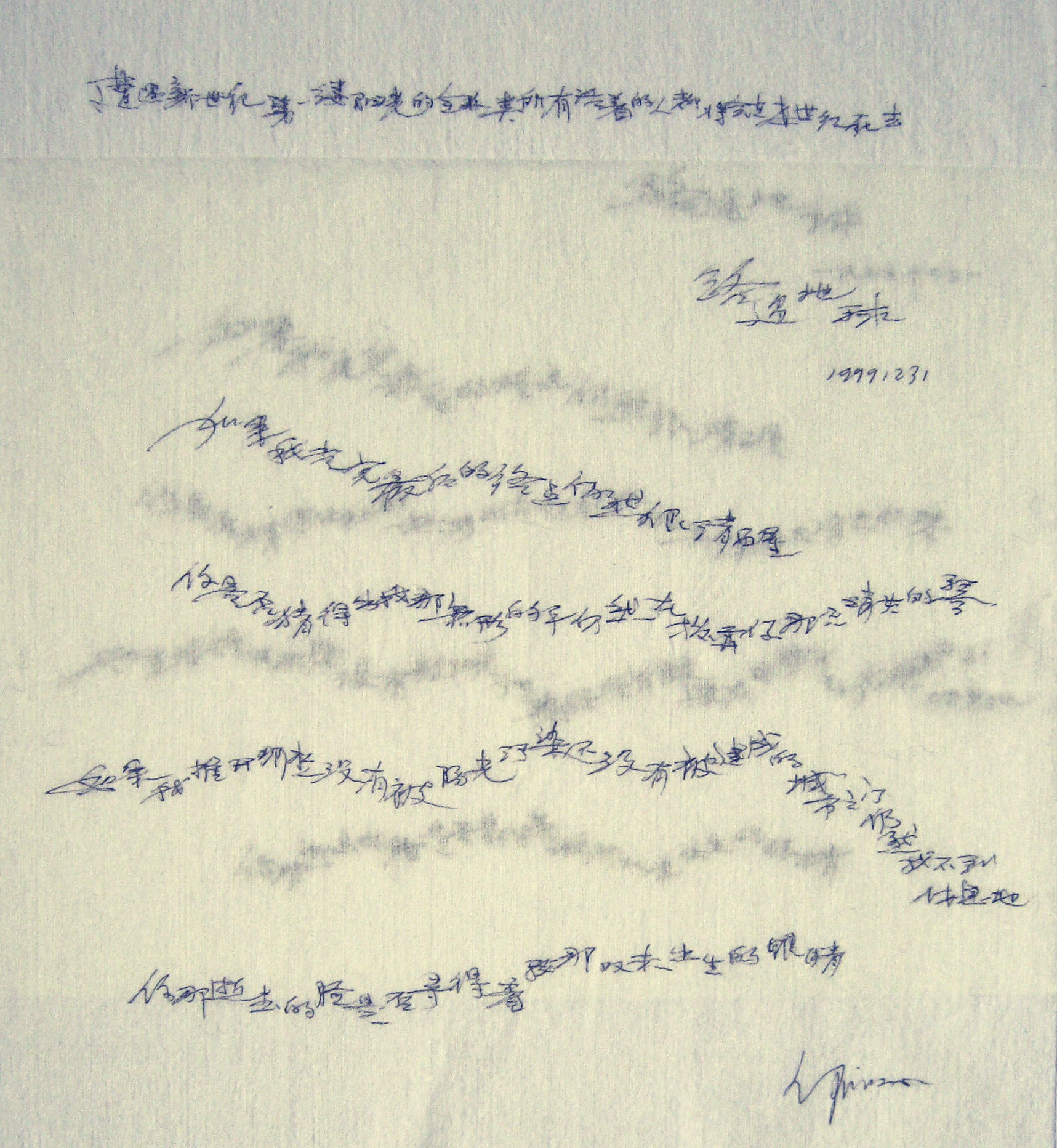
Passing By the Earth The manuscript was written by He Xuntian (1999)

- Yellow Children 黄孩子 (1991)
  - 《大海走了》The Sea is Gone
  - 《黄孩子》Yellow Children
  - 《吹箫人》The Xiao Player
  - 《不相识的父亲》The Unknown Father
  - 《缘》The Fate
  - 《枯水季节》The Dry Season
  - 《这才是你》This is You
  - 《远去的孩子》The Child Going Far Away
- Sister Drum 阿姐鼓 (1995)
  - 《没有阴影的家园》Home without Shadow
  - 《阿姐鼓》Sister Drum
  - 《天唱》Sky-Burial
  - 《笛威辛亢 纽威辛亢》Di Wei Shin Kan, New Wei Shin Kan (《天堂地狱》Paradise Inferno)
  - 《羚羊过山岗》Crossing the Ridge
  - 《卓玛的卓玛》Zhuoma of Zhuomas
  - 《转经》The Turning Scripture
- Warrior Lanling 兰陵王 (1995)
  - 《远古的回声》Ancient Echo
  - 《美丽的鳯雀部落》Beautiful Phoenix Tribe
  - 《生殖舞》Dance of Reproduction
  - 《兰陵与面具》Lanling and Mask
  - 《黑发舞》Dance of Black Hair
  - 《神树》Divine Tree
  - 《血祭》Blood Sacrifice
  - 《母亲的歌》Mother's Song
- Voices from the Sky 央金玛 (1997)
  - 《央金玛》Melodious Goddess
  - 《拉萨谣》Ballad of Lhasa
  - 《信徒》Believer
  - 《七只鼓》Seven Drums
  - 《喜玛拉雅人》Himalayans
  - 《六世达赖喇嘛情歌》The Sixth Dalai Lama's Love Song
  - 《彼岸之问》Question from the Other Shore
- Paramita 波罗密多 (2002)
  - 《云钟》Cloud Bells
  - 《波罗密多》Paramita
  - 《阿耨多罗三藐三菩提》Song of the Enlightenment
  - 《琵琶行》Song of Pipa
  - 《群僧》Monks
  - 《般若心经》Heart Sutra
  - 《尘鼓》Earth Drums
  - 《白蛇舞》Dance of the White Snake
  - 《春歌》Spring Song
  - 《千江月》Moons upon a Thousand River
- The Sigh 神迹 (2003)
  - 《鹰》The Eagle
  - 《迹》The Sign
  - 《九天乐》Ecstasy with Ninth Heaven
  - 《荒漠》Desert
  - 《孤岛》Isolated Island
  - 《十地火境》Fire in Dasa-bhumi
  - 《十地水境》Water in Dasa-bhumi
  - 《十地魔境》Magic in Dasa-bhumi
  - 《王者夺鼎战》The Battle
- Seven Days 七日谈 (2006)
  - 《不翼而飞》Flown Away
  - 《伽南香娑罗树》Fragrant Nirvana Tree
  - 《夕阳西下》In the Setting of the Sun
  - 《了歌》Already Song
  - 《三托历》Satori (《无归的路》)
  - 《路过地球》Passing By the Earth
  - 《第七天》The Seventh Day
- Mystical Scent 神香 (2007)
  - 《盛典》Sacred Book
  - 《命运之子》Son of Destiny
  - 《神香》Mystical Scent
  - 《狼婆湖》Wolf-Woman Lake
  - 《藏戏舞》Tibetan Drama Dance
  - 《恋人》Lover
  - 《山歌》Mountain Song
  - 《神香》Mystical Scent
  - 《征途》Journey
  - 《最后的眼泪》The Last Tear
  - 《神香》Mystical Scent
- Images in Sound 声音图案 (2007)
  - 《秘厘图》MiLi Pattern
  - 《拂色图》FuSe Pattern
  - 《弥泆图》MiYi Pattern
  - 《浮香图》FuXiang Pattern
  - 《密果图》MiGuo Pattern
  - 《弗意图》FuYi Pattern
  - 《靡符图》MiFu Pattern
- Tathagata 如來如去 (2009)
  - 《天外天》The Heaven Outside of Heaven
  - 《达塔伽达》Tathagata
  - 《冥思》Meditation
  - 《虚空之心》The Heart of the Void
  - 《色界》The Realm of Forms
  - 《树有风》The Wind the Trees
  - 《四方之舞》The Dance of the Four Dharmadhatus
  - 《如来如去》Tathagata
- Ehe Chant 一訸上歌 (2012)
  - 《一訸上歌》Ehe Chant
