= Whirling Udumbara I =

2013 composition for solo piano by He Xuntian

- by Xuntian He
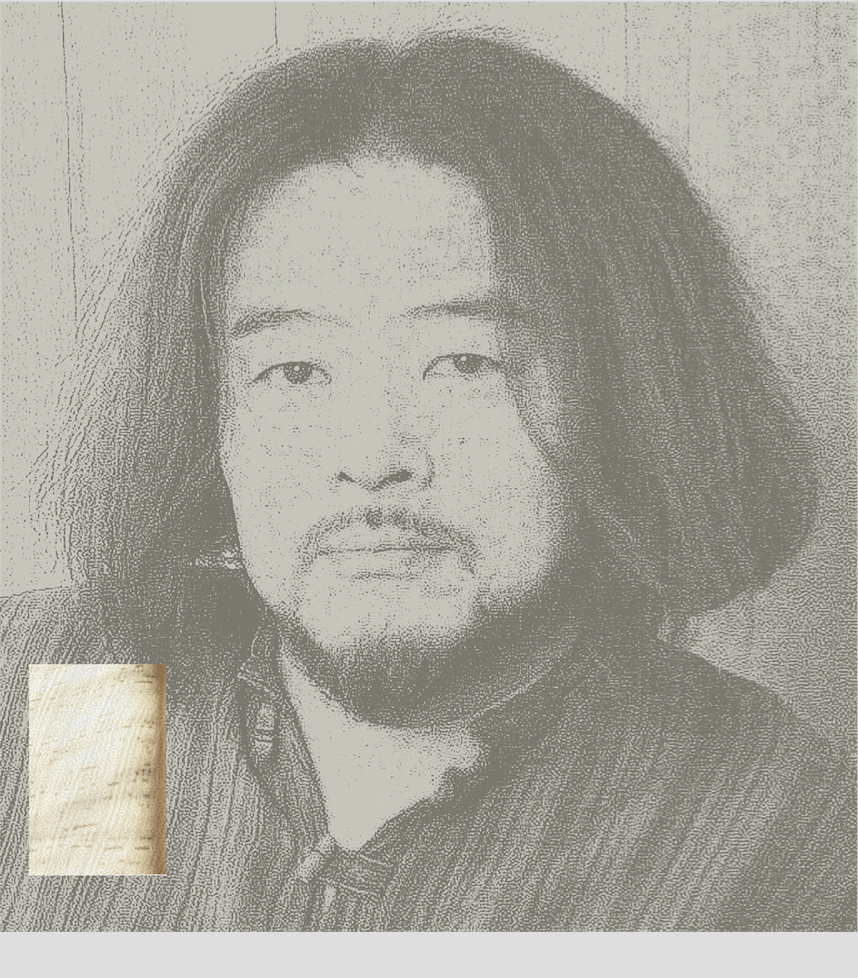
- HE XUNTIAN

Whirling Udumbara I ( 优昙波罗旋转舞 I ) is a work for piano, composed by He Xuntian in 2013.

== Summary ==
He Xuntian adopted RD Composition and SS Composition in his work Whirling Udumbara I.

== Inspiration ==
Whirling Udumbara I was inspired from Xuntian He’s poem Fragrant Nirvana Tree (1999).
