= FuSe Pattern =

1997 composition for solo piano by He Xuntian

- by Xuntian He
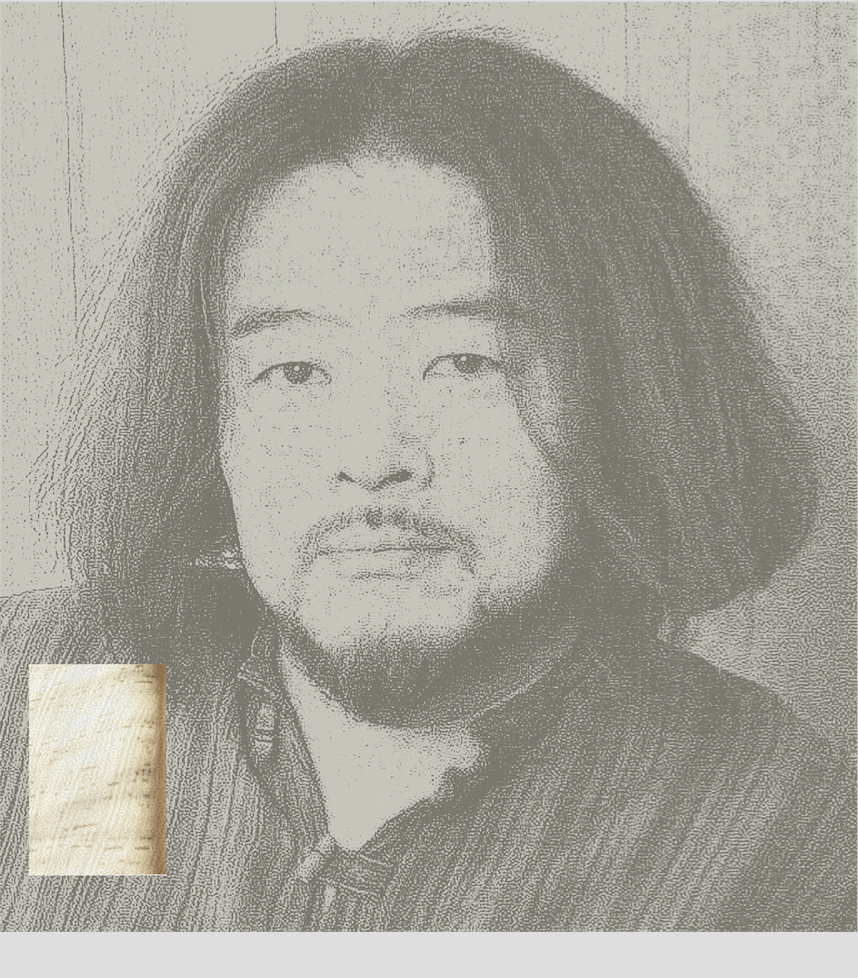
- HE XUNTIAN

FuSe Pattern ( 拂色图 ) is a work for solo piano, composed by He Xuntian in 1997.

== Summary ==
He Xuntian adopted RD Composition and SS Composition in his work FuSe Pattern.

== Inspiration ==
FuSe Pattern was inspired from Xuntian He's ideology:

Primordial music for all species.
Humanity’s first gift of sound to all species.

Making no distinction between ancient and modern;
no distinction between north, south, east and west;
no distinction between above and below, left and right;
no distinction between primary and secondary positions;
no distinction between beginning and end.
