= Leifeng Pagoda Music Ceremony =

- by Xuntian He
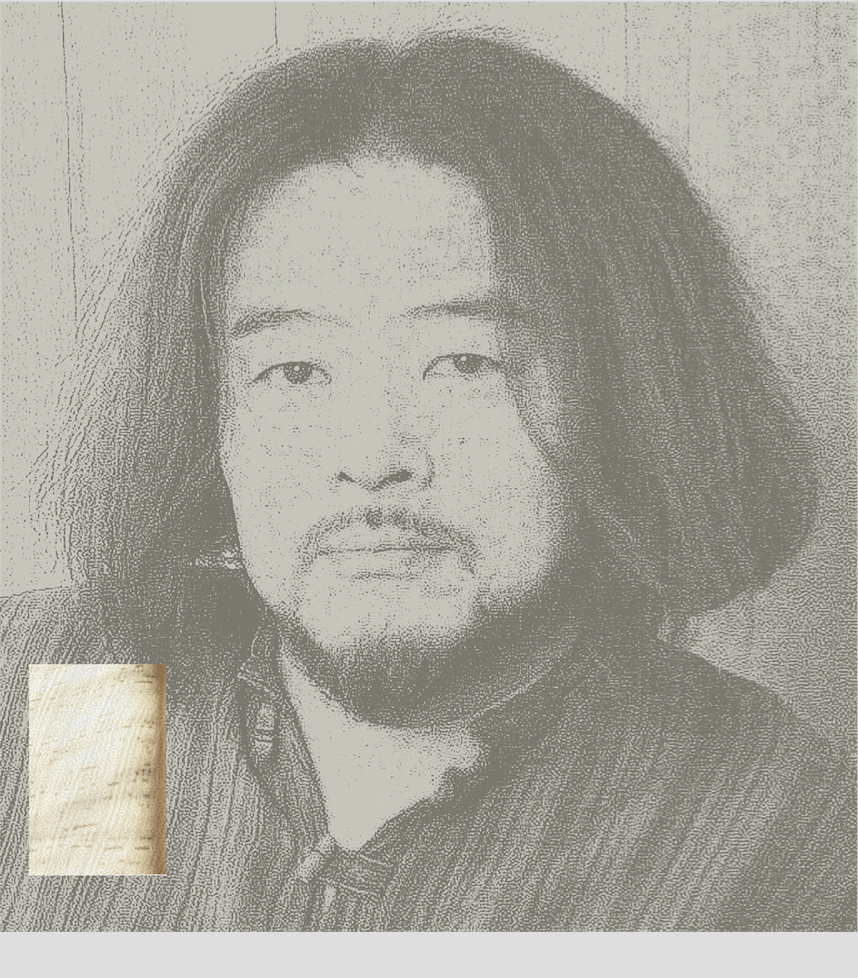
- HE XUNTIAN

Leafing Pagoda Music Ceremony (simplified Chinese: 雷峰夕照音乐大典; traditional Chinese: 雷峰夕照音樂大典; pinyin: Léifēng Xīzhào Yīnyuè Dàdiǎn) is a work for music ceremony, composed and directed by He Xuntian.

1300 performers debuted it on 25 October 2002 in Hangzhou.

== Summary ==
Leifeng Pagoda Music Ceremony has ten movements: Cloud Bells, Paramita; Song of the Enlightenment, Song of Pipa, Monks, Heart Sutra, Earth Drums, Dance of the White Snake, Spring Song, Moons upon a Thousand River.

== First Performance ==
Leifeng Pagoda Music Ceremony
Director: He Xuntian
Composer: He Xuntian
1300 performers
25 October 2002, Leifeng Pagoda in Hangzhou, China
