= Sunyata Dance =

2011 work for clarinet and symphony orchestra composed by He Xuntian

- by Xuntian He
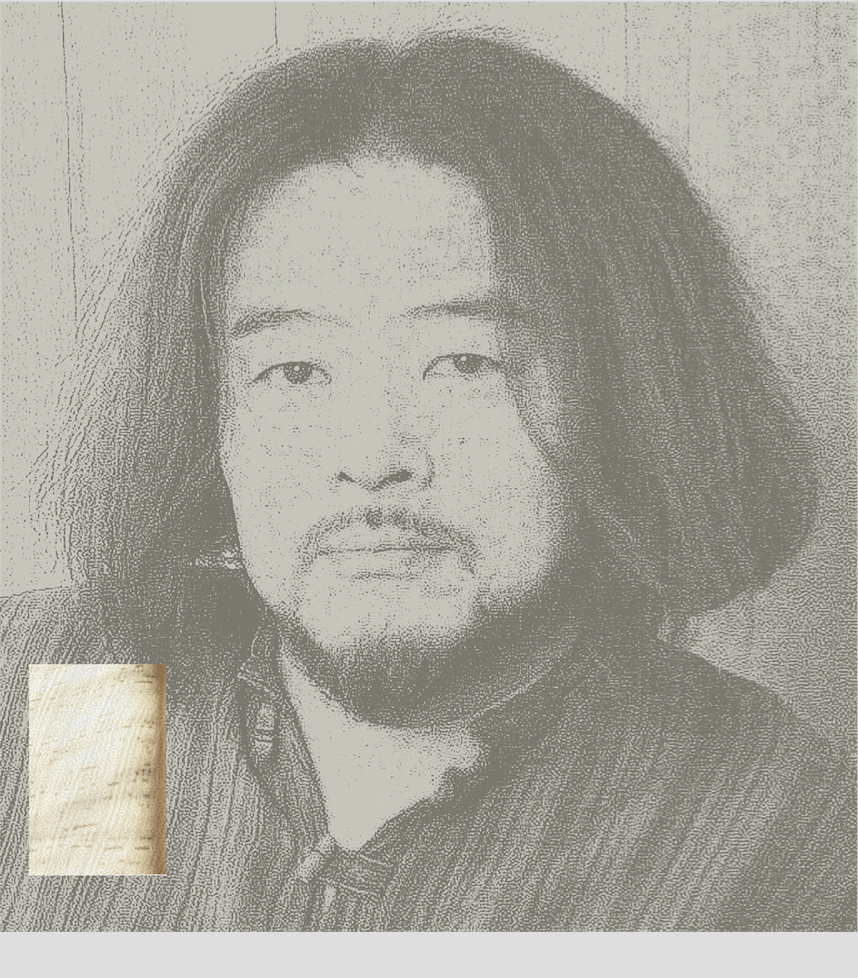
- HE XUNTIAN

Sunyata Dance ( 空之舞 ) is a work for clarinet and symphony orchestra, composed by He Xuntian in 2011.

== Summary ==
Sunyata Dance (2011) was written especially for clarinet and symphony orchestra. Sunyata is an ancient Sanskrit word. The works practice from beginning to end without stopping. With the unique technique and musicality of clarinet, this works will achieve the peak of the performance art and technique. The soloist of this works is the “highly expressive and creative” clarinetist He Yemo. The essential idea is its fluidity, in that, any part can be the end and vice versa.

== Inspiration ==
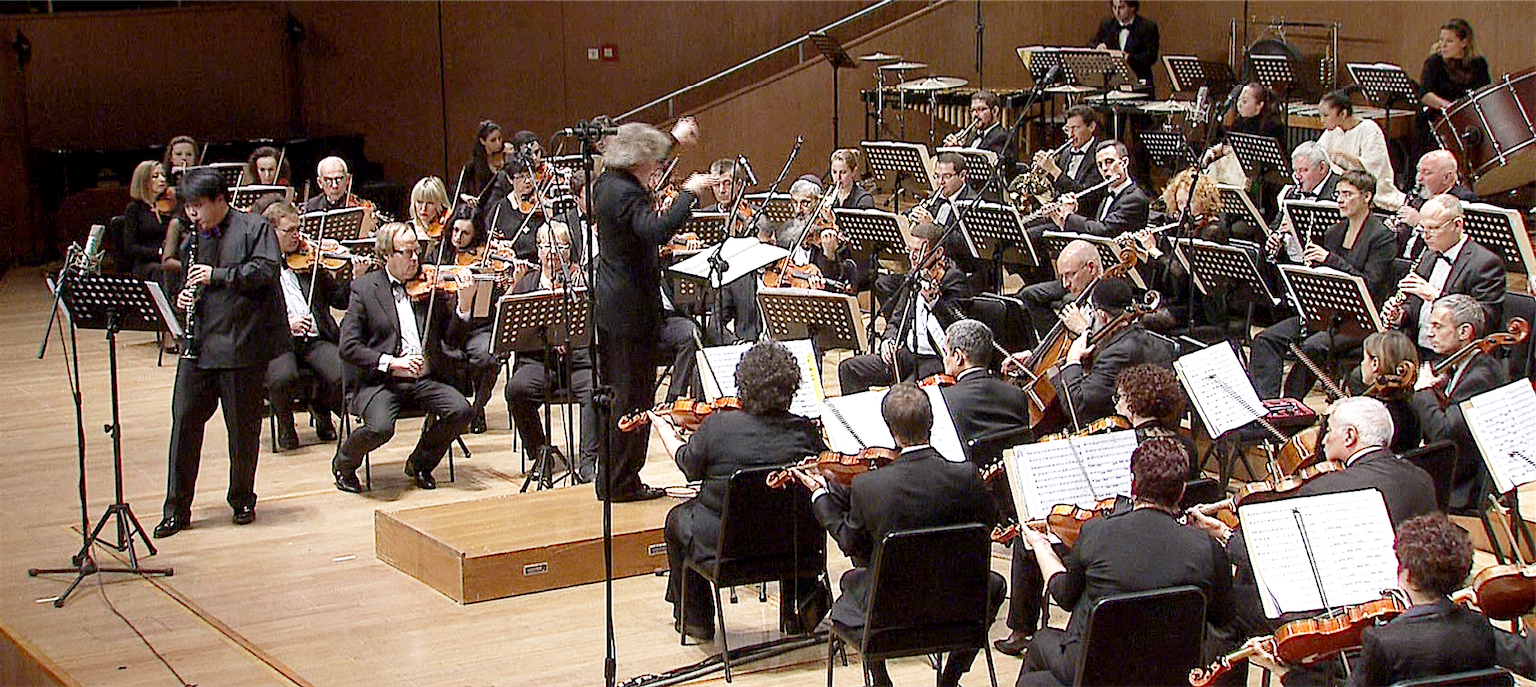
He Xuntian: Sunyata Dance , Clarinetist He Yemo and The Israel Symphony Orchestra

Sunyata Dance was inspired from Xuntian He’s ideology:
Udumbara don’t smell like papaver.
Five Nons: Non-Western, non-Eastern, non-academic, non-folk, and non-non.

== First performance ==
8. November 2014 Shanghai, Concert Hall, Oriental Art Center (CN)
Clarinetist: He Yemo
Dirigent: James Judd
Israel Symphony Orchestra
