= Dadawa =

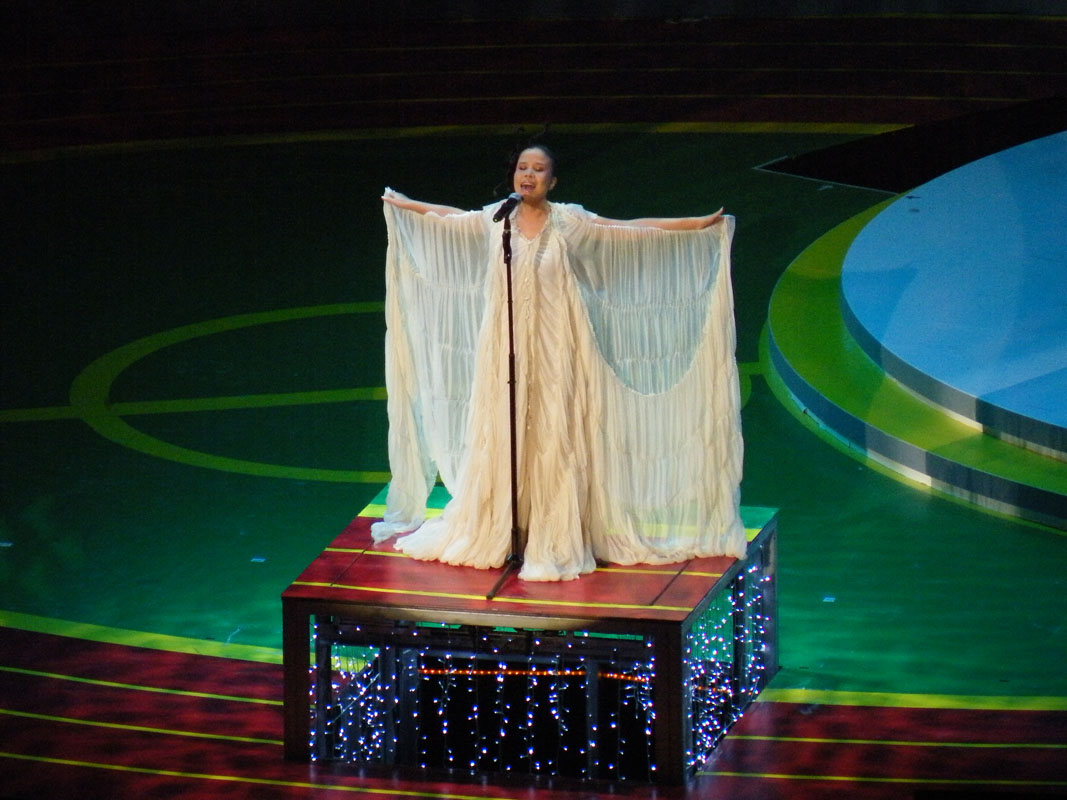
- Dadawa performing at the 2009 East Asian Games closing ceremony
- Born: Zhu Zheqin; 15 July 1968 (age 57); Guangzhou, Guangdong
- Occupation: singer
- Years active: 1992–Present

Chinese name
Transcriptions
Standard Mandarin
- Hanyu Pinyin: zhu1 zhe2 qin2
Yue: Cantonese
- Jyutping: zyu1 zit3 kam4
- Musical career
- Origin: China
- Genres: World; Pop music
- Label: Sire/WEA Records

Dadawa a.k.a. Zhu Zheqin (朱哲琴) (born 15 July 1968) is a Chinese musician, sound artist and independent producer. She has also served as a UNDP Goodwill Ambassador. Dadawa established SOUND LAB at Shanghai's Tongji University, Institute of Architecture and Design, where she is an adjunct professor.

Over the past 20 years, with music as her point of departure, Dadawa is noted for her crossover artistic exploration. She was the first Chinese musician to release her music globally, beginning with “Sister Drum”, distributed by Warner Music in 1995. As an avant-garde pioneer of contemporary Chinese music, her works have entered the fields of sound as well as design and visual, public, community, and performance art.

In recent years, Dadawa has sought to bring together traditional craftsmanship and contemporary design. KANJIAN, a brand she established in 2012, combines contemporary design with traditional Chinese artisanal craftsmanship. KANJIAN creations are distinguished by their references to Chinese history, philosophy and aesthetics.

== Dadawa's representative music and sound art works ==
- Yellow Children (1992)
- Sister Drum 1995
- Voices from the sky 1997
- Seven Days 2006
- Moonrise 2010
- Sense of Hearing 2014
- Fuchun Mountain Soundscape 2016
- Sound Script after Book from the Sky 2018 for Xu Bing UCCA Solo exhibition
- Bell Shelter”for Setouchi Triennial Japan 2019

== Sources ==
- Setouchi Triennial 2019
- Moonrise – Dadawa and Ethnic Music Masters
- 'Chinese World Music' Act Dadawa Drums Up Acclaim
