= Beijing Concert Hall =

Performing arts venue in Beijing, China

Coordinates: 39.904658°N 116.376404°E

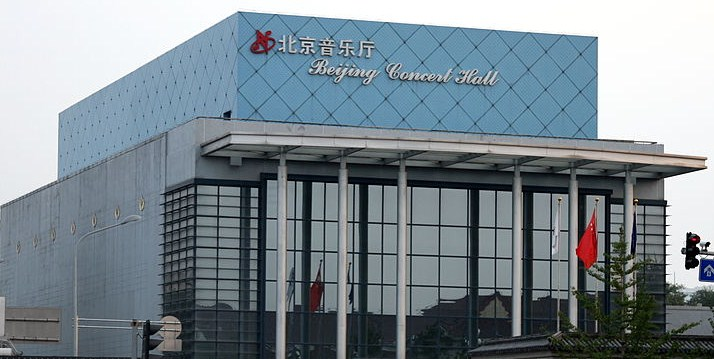
Beijing Concert Hall on 04-Sep-2010.

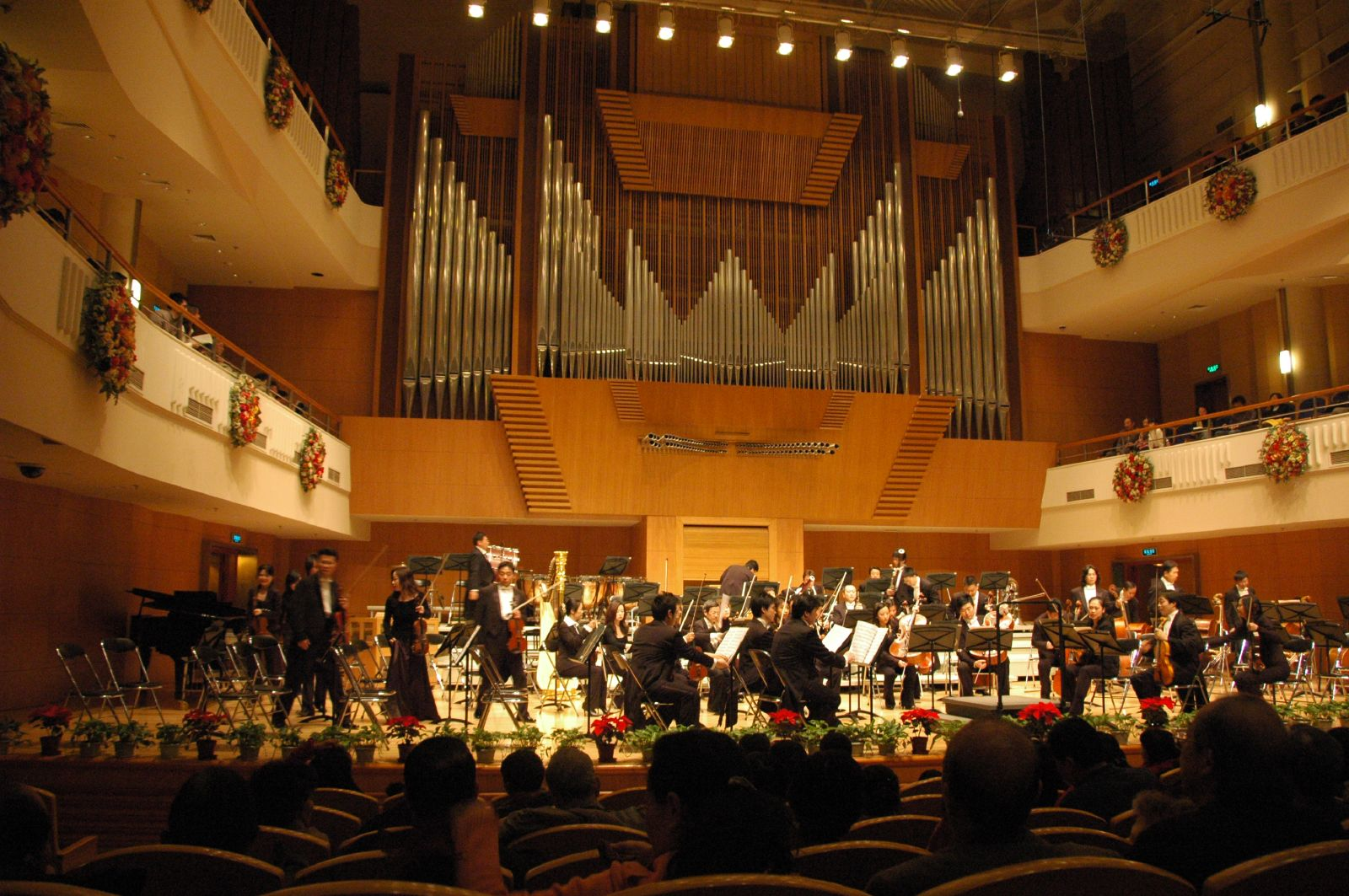
Performance by the China Philharmonic Orchestra at the Beijing Concert Hall

The Beijing Concert Hall (北京音乐厅; Beijing Yinyueting) is located on the Beixinhuajie in Xicheng District, near the west Chang'an Avenue, on the south of Liubukou.
