= Showcase Cinemas =

Cinema chain based in the United States

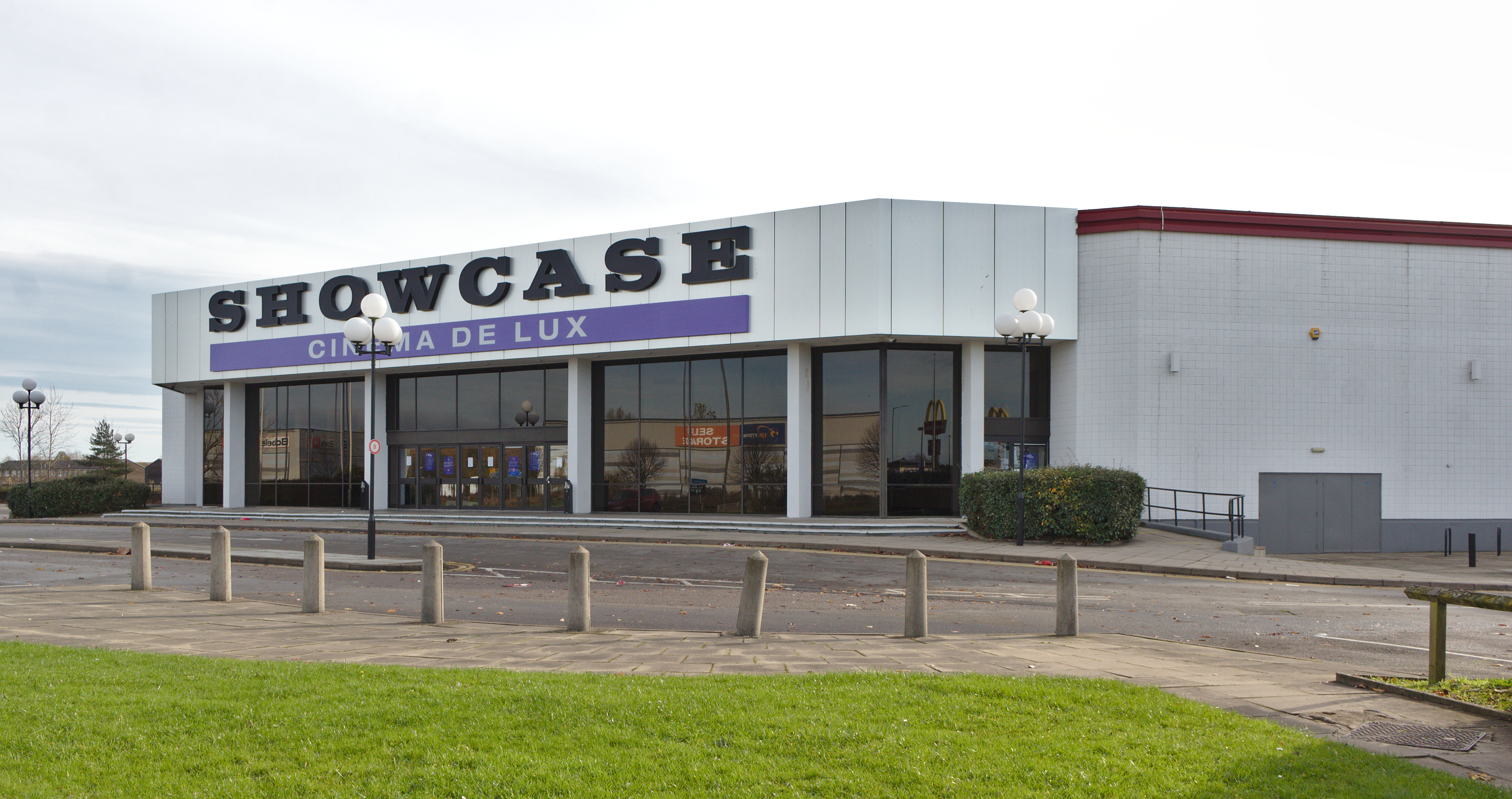
- Showcase Cinema de Lux in Liverpool, England
- Type: Subsidiary
- Industry: Entertainment
- Headquarters: Norwood, Massachusetts
- Number of locations: 37 (November 2026)
- Area served: Argentina; United Kingdom; United States
- Owner: Kinepolis (United States); Mooky Greidinger (United Kingdom); Skydance (Argentina)
- Website: showcasecinemas.com; showcasecinemas.co.uk; todoshowcase.com

Showcase Cinemas is an American-based movie theater chain owned and operated by the Belgian Kinepolis Group. Internationally, it operates in the United Kingdom and Argentina under separate ownership.

== Operations ==
Showcase operates a total of 13 theaters in the United States: seven in the Greater Boston area within Massachusetts; one in Rhode Island; four in New York; and one in Springdale, Ohio. These theaters operate under the brands Showcase Cinemas, Cinema de Lux, and (in the sole case of Chestnut Hill, Massachusetts) Showcase SuperLux. Several now-shuttered locations in New York City formerly operated under the name Multiplex Cinemas. The Cinema de Lux brand was established in 2008 to denote locations that offered in-theater dining options and full bars with seat delivery service. All locations are wheelchair accessible and offer assistance devices for hearing- and sight-impaired customers.

Internationally, Showcase operates eight theaters in Argentina and 16 in the United Kingdom.

On June 11, 2026, Paramount Skydance (later known as Skydance) announced it would be selling all American locations owned by Harbor Lights Entertainment (formerly National Amusements) to Belgian-based theater operator Kinepolis. The deal was closed on September 11, 2026. Harbor Lights attempted to sell the British operations to Frasers Group, with the latter commissioning The Light Cinemas as a tenant, in 2026 before the deal broke down.

On August 25, 2026, entertainment website Omelete reported that Harbor Lights had sold the Brazilian operations of UCI Cinemas (totaling 25 locations) to a joint venture between Grupo Vila Rica and Cine Araújo.

== Gallery ==
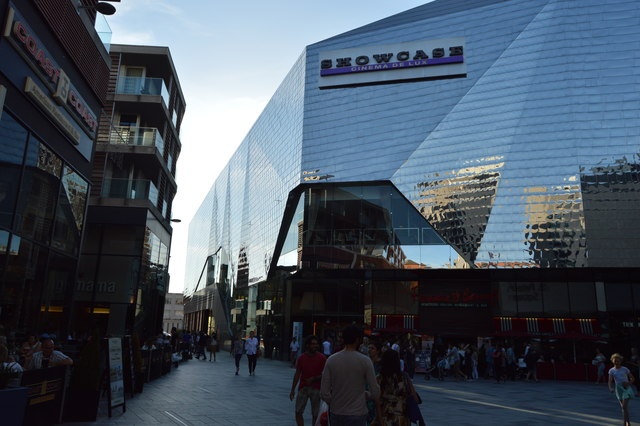
Showcase Cinema de Lux in Leicester, England

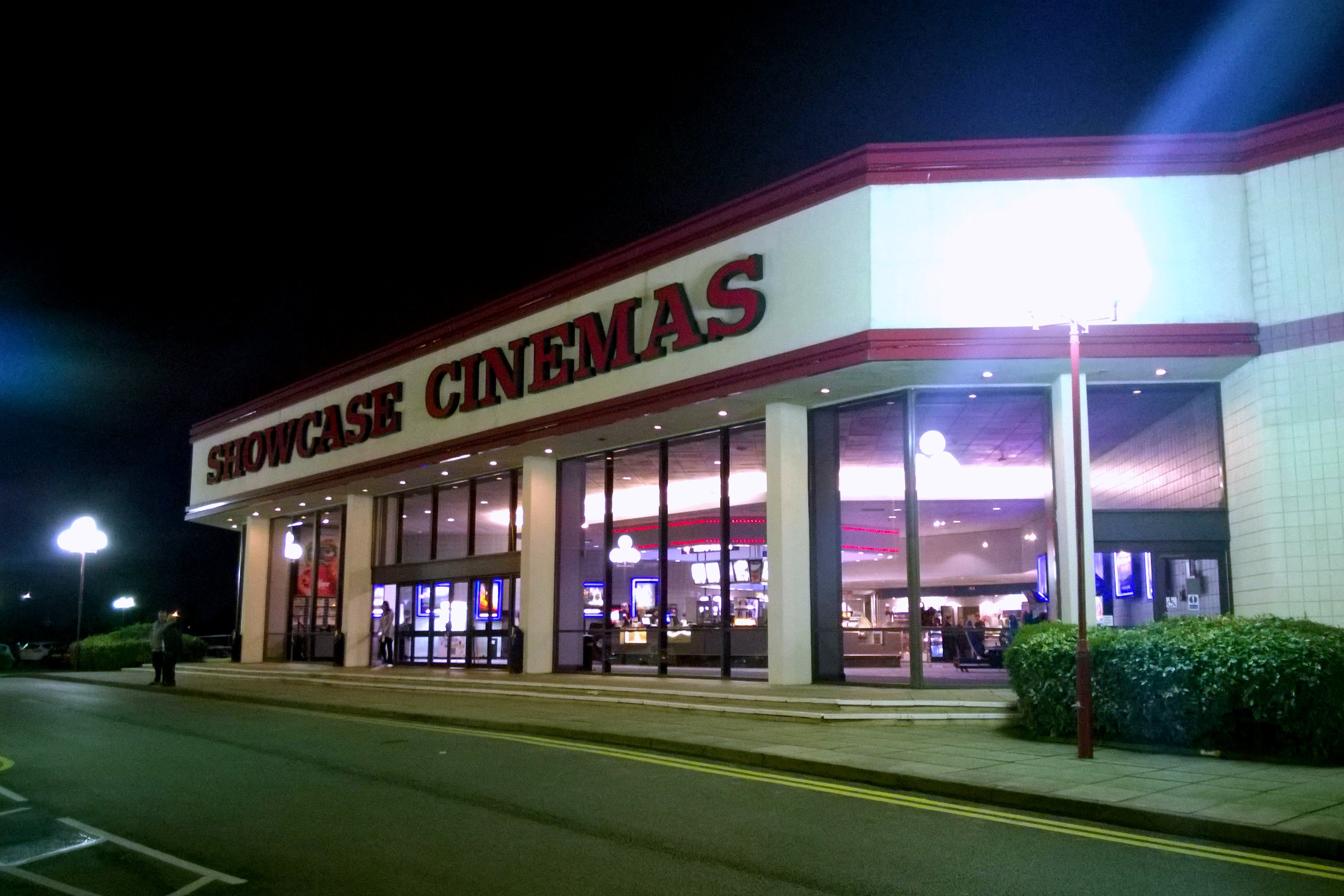
Showcase Cinemas in Liverpool, England

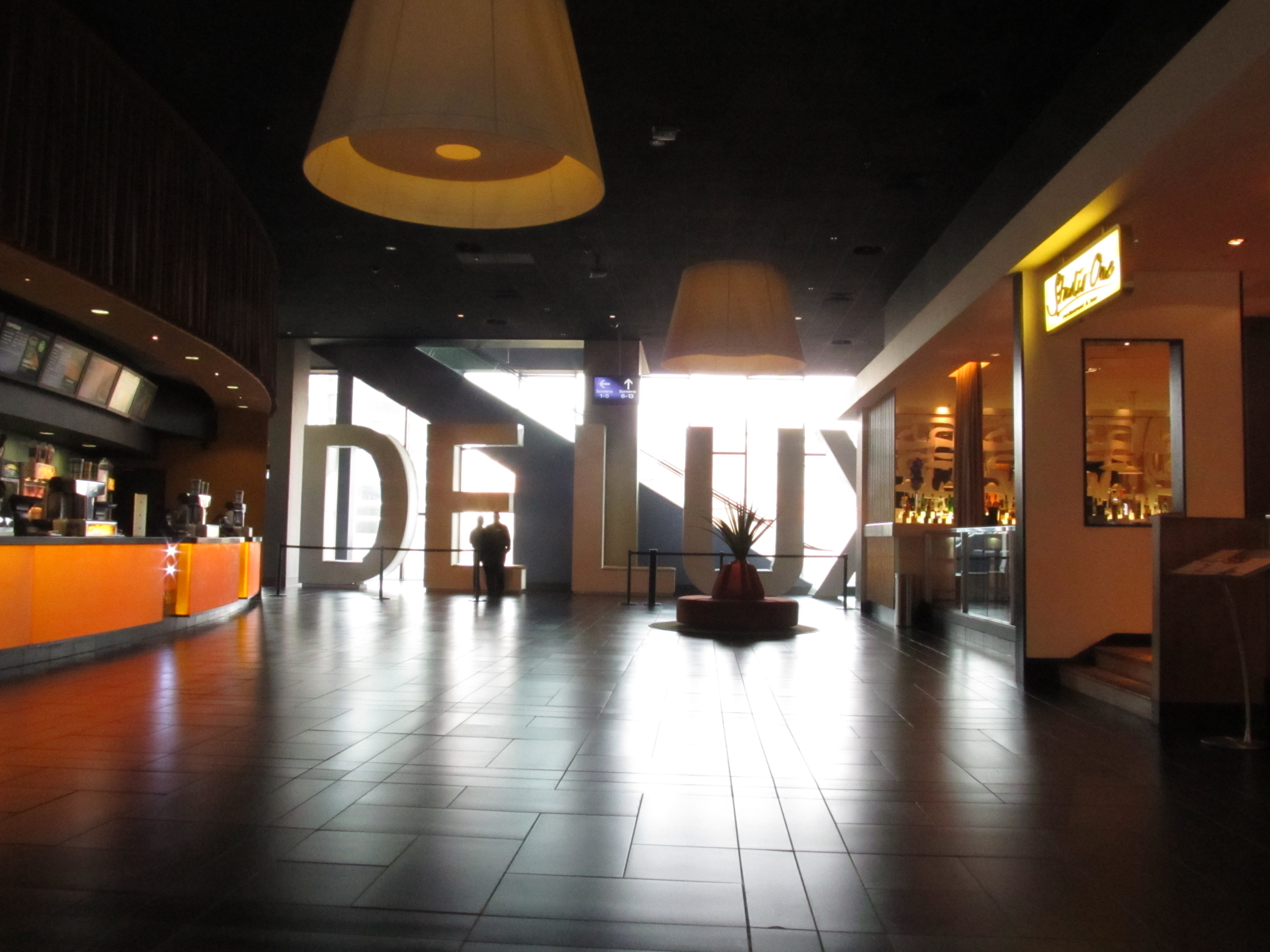
Foyer of Cinema de Lux in Bristol, England

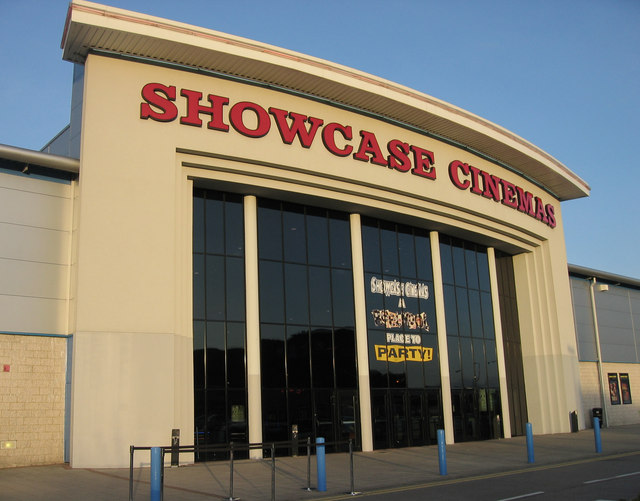
Showcase Cinemas in Nantgarw, Wales

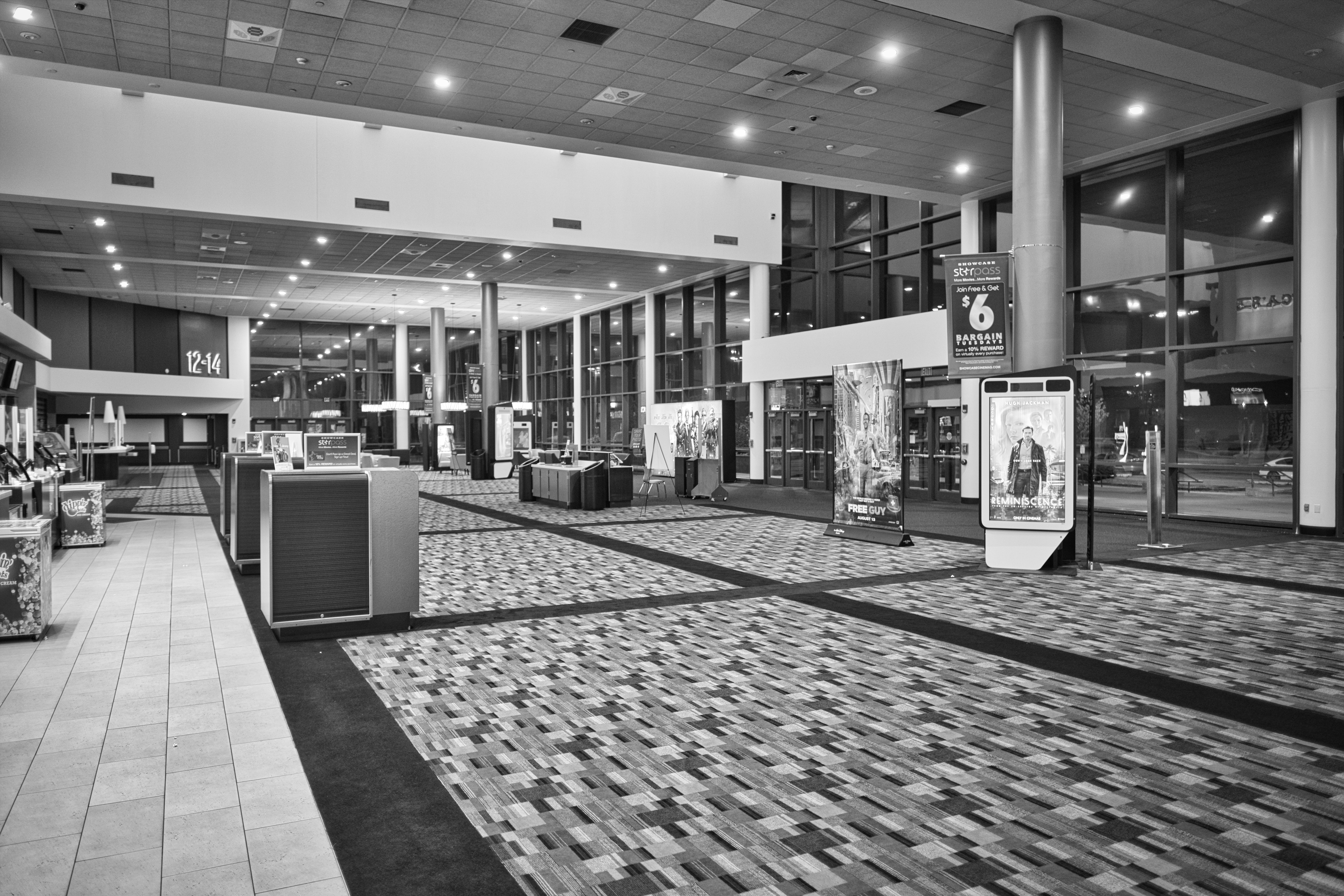
Lobby of the Showcase Cinema de Lux in Woburn, Massachusetts

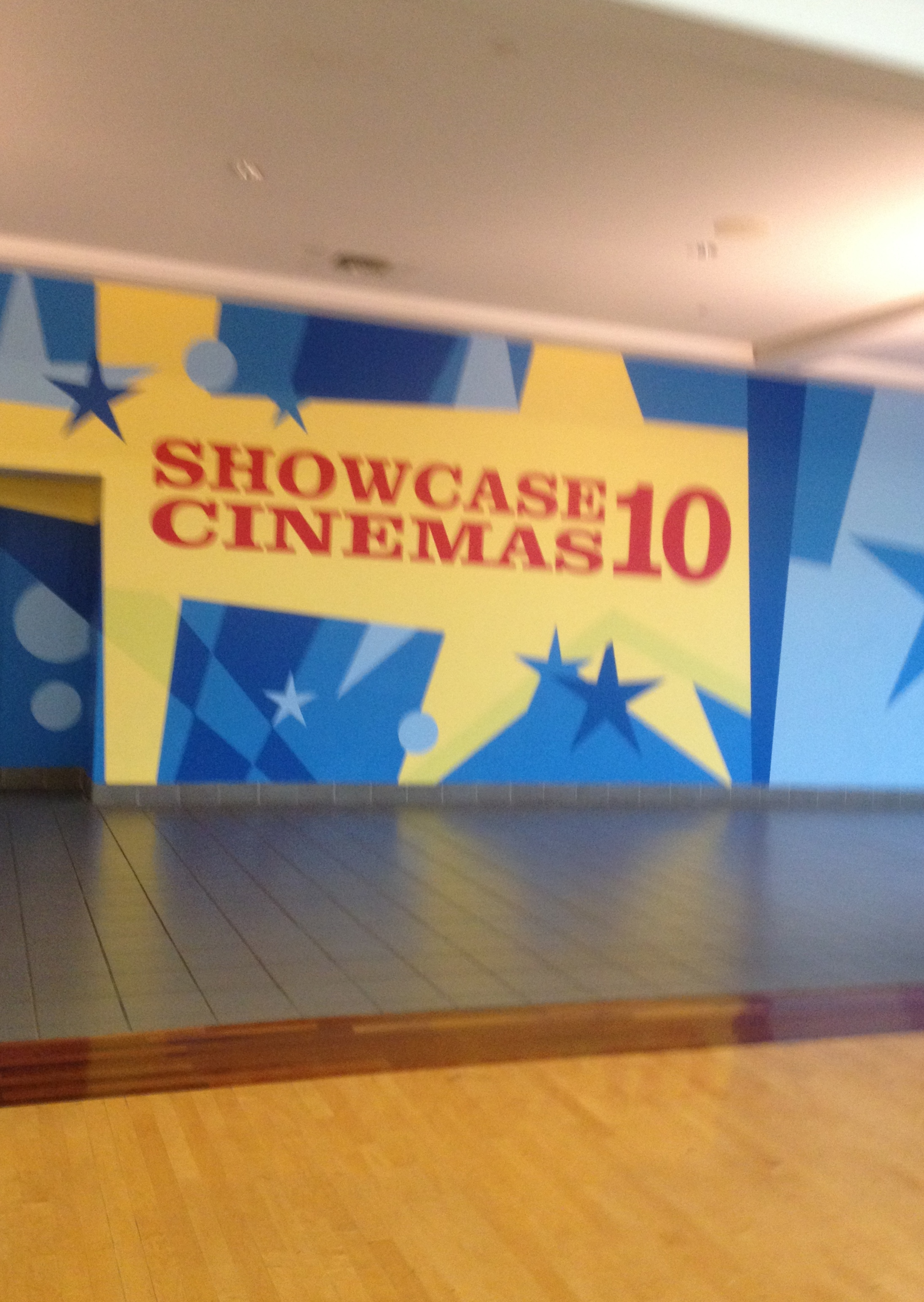
A now-defunct Showcase Cinemas in Cincinnati Mills Mall, Forest Park, Ohio
