= Forest Fair Mall =

Defunct mall in Hamilton County, Ohio, U.S.

Coordinates: 39.303262°N 84.518603°W

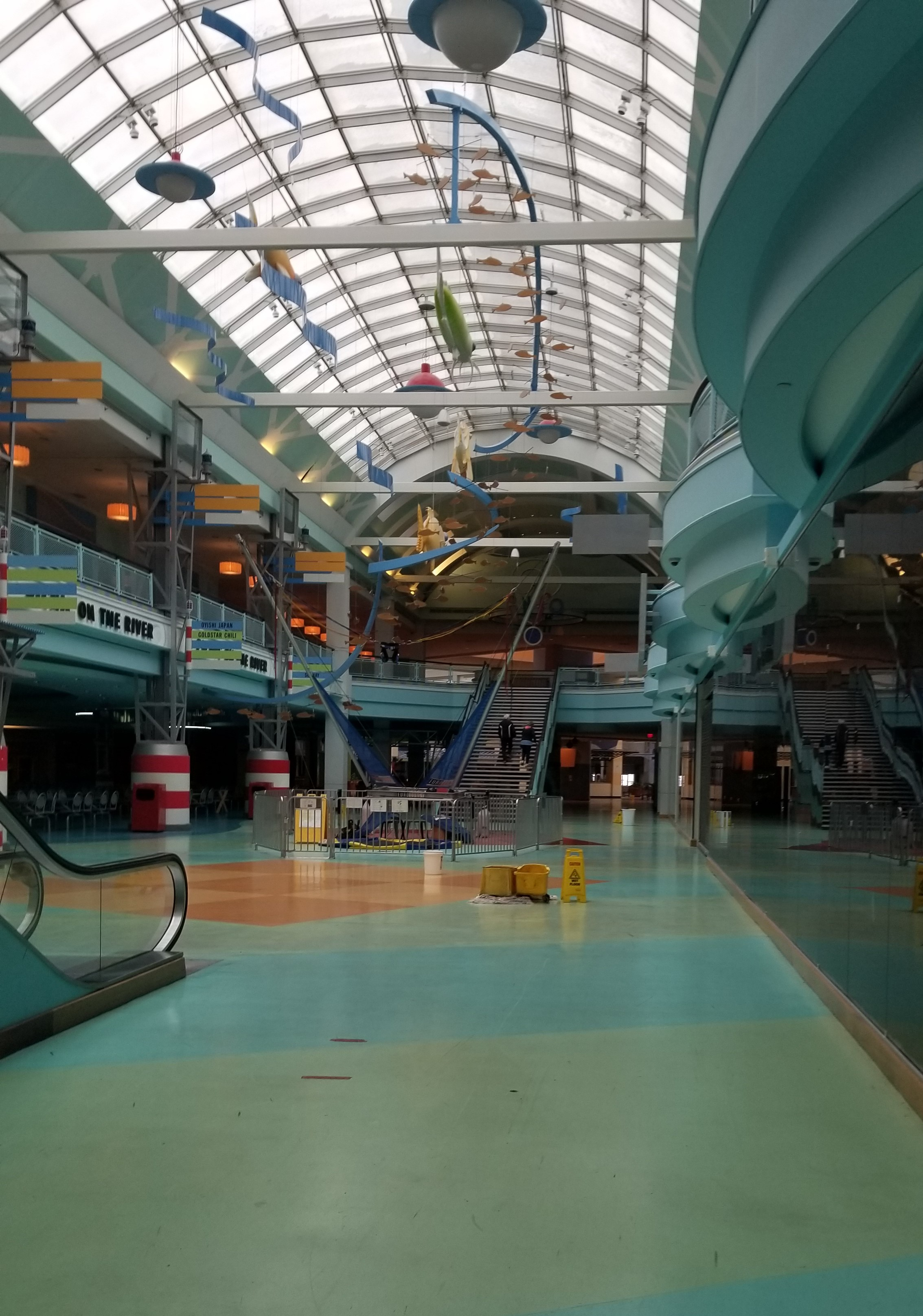
- Interior view (November 2018)
- Location: Forest Park and Fairfield, Ohio, U.S.
- Address: 1047 Cincinnati Mills Drive
- Opened: July 11, 1988; 38 years ago
- Renovated: 1992; Mid-1990s; 2004; 2013
- Closed: December 2, 2022; 3 years ago
- Demolished: September 21, 2025 – March 6, 2026
- Previous names: The Malls at Forest Fair (1992–2002); Cincinnati Mills (2002–2009); Cincinnati Mall (2009–2013); Forest Fair Village (2013–2022)
- Developer: LJ Hooker
- Owner: Hillwood Investment Group; The Hillman Group
- Architect: HOK Group
- Num. of stores: 200+ (at peak)
- Num. of anchor tenants: 5 (at peak)
- Floor area: 1,500,000 square feet (140,000 m^{2})
- Floors: 2
- Parking: Parking lot with 6,000 free spaces; Parking garage
- Public transit: Metro
- Website: Official website at the Wayback Machine (archived September 23, 2007)

Forest Fair Mall (Note: Also known as: The Malls at Forest Fair, Cincinnati Mills, Cincinnati Mall, and Forest Fair Village.) was a super-regional shopping mall in the northern suburbs of Cincinnati, Ohio, United States. It was located on the border between Forest Park and Fairfield, at the junction of Interstate 275 and Winton Road.

Opened in phases between 1988 and 1989, the mall has become noted for its troubled history. Despite being the second-biggest mall in the state of Ohio and bringing many new retailers to the Cincinnati market, it lost three anchor stores (B. Altman and Company, Bonwit Teller, and Sakowitz) and its original owner LJ Hooker to bankruptcy less than a year after opening. The mall underwent renovations throughout the mid-1990s as The Malls at Forest Fair under its second owner, Gator Investments, attracting new big-box stores such as Kohl's, Burlington Coat Factory, and Bass Pro Shops. The Mills Corporation renamed the property Cincinnati Mills in 2002, and renovated the mall once more in August 2004. Following the sale of Mills' portfolio to Simon Property Group, the mall was sold several times, while continuing to lose many of its key tenants due to a combination of retailer bankruptcies and increased competition from newer shopping centers.

After having been renamed Cincinnati Mall, and again to Forest Fair Village in the 2010s, the property became a dead mall. It also received a number of proposals for renovation, none of which were realized. Following years of losing tenants, it closed to the public in December 2022, with the exception of Kohl's and Bass Pro Shops. Those stores closed in 2024 and 2025, respectively. Demolition of the entire complex began in September 2025, and was completed in March 2026. The mall is being replaced by an industrial park.

== History ==
=== 1985–1988: Planning and construction ===
Original logo (1988–1992)

In 1985, real estate developer Amega selected the site at the northeast corner of the Interstate 275 beltway's interchange with Winton Road in suburban Cincinnati, Ohio, for the development of a retail property. Initially, the site was to consist solely of Bigg's, a local hypermarket chain. Romanian-Australian business executive George Herscu, then chairman of the Australian real estate company LJ Hooker, acquired the property from Amega in 1986, and chose to make Bigg's an anchor store to a shopping mall with 1.5 million square feet (140,000 m^{2}) of retail space. About 70% of the proposed building was located in Forest Park and the rest in Fairfield.

In July 1987, Herscu announced that two department stores had committed to the project: Higbee's and Bonwit Teller. Overall, Forest Fair Mall would be the second-biggest mall in the state of Ohio at the time of construction, behind only the now-demolished Randall Park Mall in the Cleveland suburb of North Randall. Architectural plans called for a two-story structure with space for up to 200 stores. Decor was to feature "soaring, cathedral type ceilings, supported by steel beams and covered with curved glass". Also in 1987, Hooker bought a controlling interest in Bonwit Teller and three other department stores: B. Altman and Company, Parisian, and Sakowitz. B. Altman was confirmed as a tenant in November 1987, and Parisian in March 1988, while negotiations with Sakowitz began in October 1988.

=== 1988–1990: Grand opening and early years ===
In June 1988, a month before the mall's scheduled opening, Higbee's withdrew from the project after being purchased by a joint venture of Dillard's and Edward J. DeBartolo Sr. As a result, B. Altman was relocated from its original location to the space vacated by Higbee's, leaving a vacant anchor store and delaying the opening of the rest of the mall.

The first phase of the mall, featuring Bigg's and approximately 20 other stores, opened in July 1988. Immediately after that wing opened, Elder-Beerman was confirmed for the vacated anchor. The opening of the remainder of the mall was delayed until March 1989. About one-third of the mall tenants were open then, including Bonwit Teller, B. Altman, Parisian, and a food court. By mid-year, Elder-Beerman and Sakowitz had also opened. Other tenants included an Australian restaurant called Wallaby Bob's, a 1950s-styled diner, Oshman's Sporting Goods, and an eight-screen movie theater called Super Saver. Many of the tenants were unique at the time: Wallaby Bob's was "the first brewery-restaurant in the nation that operates in a suburban shopping mall", while another tenant, Koala Klubhouse, was the first licensed day care in an American shopping mall. Another major tenant present at opening day was a 100,000-square-foot (9,300 m^{2}) entertainment complex called Time Out, featuring a carousel and miniature golf course. The inclusion of such entertainment venues was cited by The New York Times as an example of shopping malls staying competitive by offering options besides retail stores. The Times compared it to the inclusion of entertainment at West Edmonton Mall in Edmonton, Alberta, Canada. A 1989 article in The Cincinnati Enquirer described the mall as "entering uncharted waters" due to Sakowitz, B. Altman, Parisian, and Bonwit Teller all being not only new to the Cincinnati market but offering higher-priced merchandise available at those stores, in comparison to the area's more blue-collar demographics.

An estimate by the Enquirer valued Forest Fair's building costs at $200 million ($451 million in 2025) to build. Concourses between Bigg's and Parisian were about 1,740 feet (530 m) long, using over 80,000 feet (24,000 m) of wood. It had two stories, with three wings forming into a Y shape. The Dallas, Texas-based firm Hellmuth, Obata + Kassabaum (now called HOK) was the architect. Original decor of the mall included peach and teal tones, brass handrails along the concourses, lighting mounted on poles, and barrel-vaulted ceilings that alternated between brass linings and skylights. Decor within the mall concourses included a number of fountains and sculptures, including mechanical fish and hangings that resembled sails. Diane Heilenman of the Courier Journal noted that the heavy use of skylights, mirrors, and ceramic tile gave the mall a strong usage of light, and compared it to being "inside a pinball machine". The B. Altman store also featured brass as a primary decorative element, along with parquet floors and a color scheme of rose and mauve. Bonwit Teller also employed brass and a color scheme of peach and teal, while Parisian's store mostly used mahogany wood and softer shades of blue, such as periwinkle.

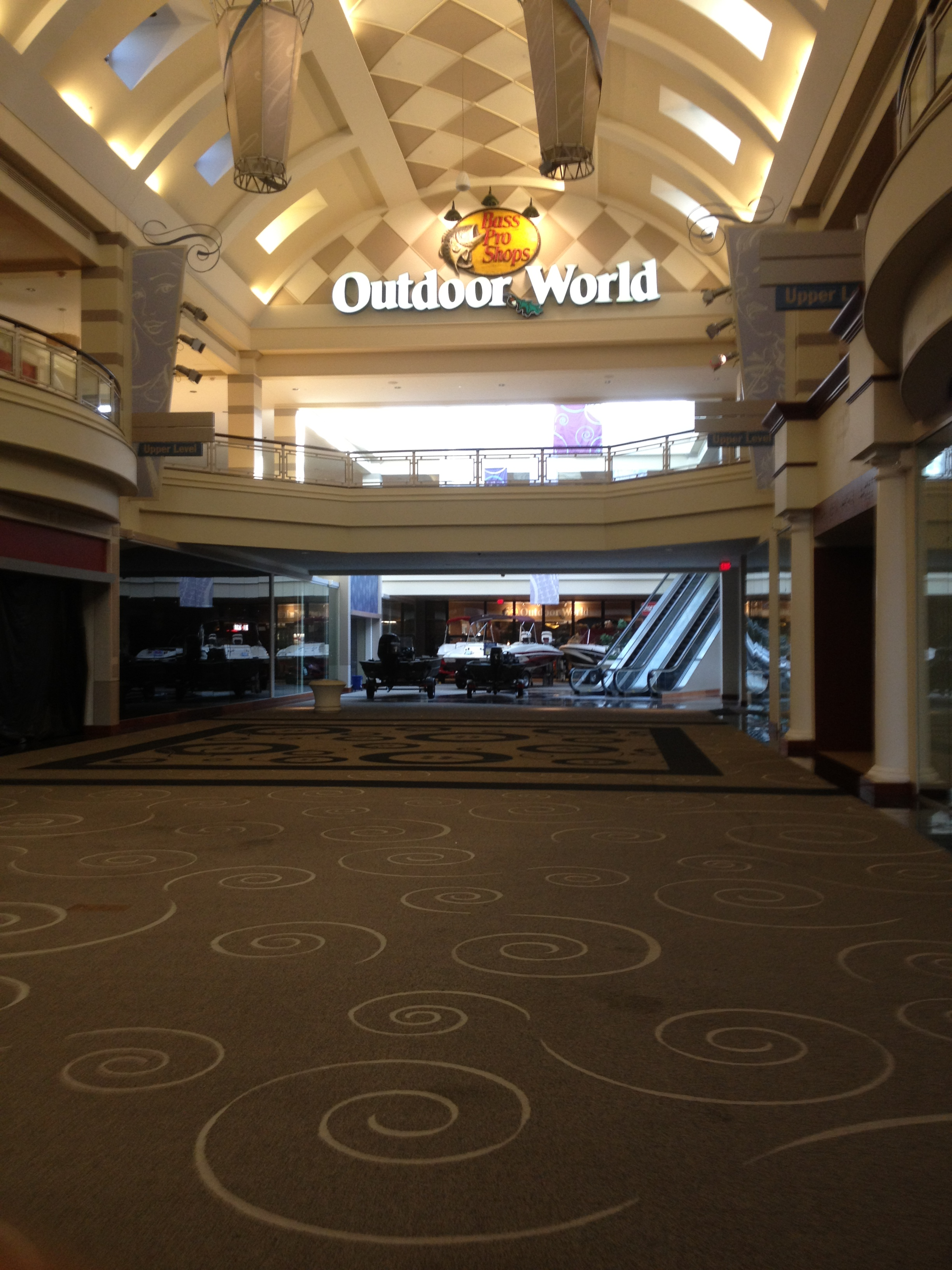
The mall entrance of Bass Pro Shops

LJ Hooker filed for bankruptcy soon after the mall opened due to debt accrued by the company's expansion in the United States. The company put Forest Fair up for sale for $200 million in June 1989. At this point, only 65% of the inline mall space was occupied, and the mall was described as "struggling" due to the many vacancies, primarily in the B. Altman wing. The proximity to both Northgate Mall and Tri-County Mall was also cited as a factor in the mall's struggles, compounded by the latter's expansion not long after Forest Fair opened. Despite the mall's troubles, the owners of Parisian noted that the store's sales were strong enough for the company to consider expansion in the Cincinnati market. As part of LJ Hooker's bankruptcy filing, the company put all four of the department stores it had acquired on the market. Parisian was sold back to its previous ownership, while the other three were to be liquidated. The other six B. Altman stores began that process in November 1989, although the Forest Fair store was kept open to prevent its closure from lowering the mall's value. Liquidation sales began in August 1990 at the Forest Fair locations of all three department stores. All of the other Sakowitz stores were also liquidated at this point, along with all but two locations of Bonwit Teller. These locations, both in Upstate New York, were sold to The Pyramid Companies. In October 1990, the mall was sold to FFM Limited, a partnership headed by a group of banks which had loaned Hooker most of the $250 million in construction costs.

=== 1992–2001: The Malls at Forest Fair ===
In May 1992, the owners announced The Malls at Forest Fair, a new concept for the mall. Under this concept, each wing would focus on a different theme of shopping. The southwestern wing, featuring Parisian and Elder-Beerman, became "The Fashions at Forest Fair", featuring apparel and traditional department stores. The northwestern wing, vacated by B. Altman, became "The Lifestyles at Forest Fair", with stores focused on home decor, entertainment, and sporting goods. Surrounding Bigg's, the eastern wing became "The Markets at Forest Fair", which featured tenants centered on "value, services, and convenience". Finally, center court and the former location of Bonwit Teller became "The Festival at Forest Fair", focused on entertainment and new restaurants. Lexington, Kentucky-based clothing store Dawahares opened its first Ohio store in the vacated Sakowitz space, while Subway and Hot Dog on a Stick joined the food court. By June 1993, further new tenants had opened, including a Sam Goody/Suncoast Motion Picture Company music and video superstore in the Lifestyle wing and a CompUSA electronics store in the Markets wing. At the time, each of the other wings was about 90% leased except for the Lifestyle wing, which was only 25% leased. Due to the increased traffic brought on by the new stores, many new retail developments were constructed at the I-275 interchange, while the increase in businesses also boosted tax revenues in Forest Park. The Altman's space remained vacant until late 1994, when Kohl's opened there. This was the first of three stores it opened that year as it entered the Cincinnati market.

The mall was put on sale again in 1995, with FFM representatives noting that the partnership had never intended to maintain ownership for more than five years. Miami, Florida-based Gator Investments ultimately bought the mall in January 1996. Several anchor stores in the mall changed under Gator's ownership: Dawahares closed in late 1996 due to poor sales, Berean Christian Stores signed a 10-year lease for a 21,250 square feet (1,974 m^{2}) Christian bookstore at the mall in late 1997, while Parisian closed in June 1998 and Guitar Center replaced CompUSA in August 1998 after that store moved to a larger location across from Tri-County Mall. A gym called Moore's Fitness also opened during this time.

In late 1999 and early 2000, Gator Investments began a second renovation which attracted several new tenants. Under these plans, they worked with Glimcher Realty Trust as leasing agent. The mall underwent a myriad of changes soon afterward, including three anchor stores that opened in October 2000: Bass Pro Shops opened in the former Parisian, Burlington Coat Factory replaced the former "Festival" wing, and Stein Mart entered Ohio with a temporary outlet store in the space Dawahares left. Also joining the mall in 2000 through 2001 were Media Play, Saks Off 5th, the outlet division of Saks Fifth Avenue, and the first Steve & Barry's sports clothing store in Ohio. These stores were part of a reconceptualization of the mall as "a value retail center with new-to-the-market merchants". This reconceptualization included new entertainment venues, like a nightclub called Metropolis, a new Showcase Cinemas theater complex with stadium seating, and a new children's playplace called Wonderpark.

=== 2002–2007: Cincinnati Mills ===
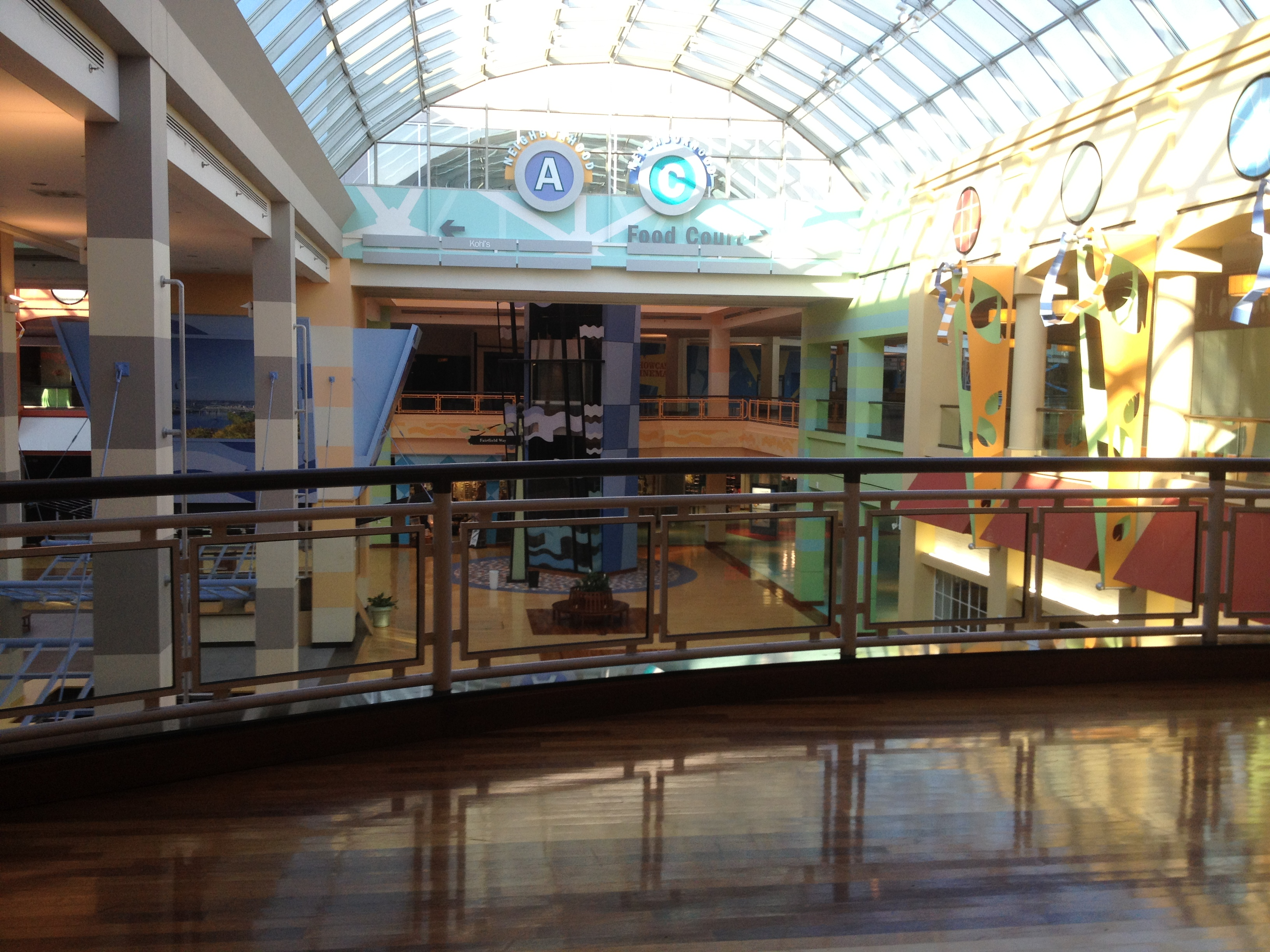
The mall's central court in July 2013, as seen from the upper level of the Bass Pro Shops wing

Former PBS Kids Backyard, which became a generic children's play area (November 2018)

The Arlington, Virginia-based Mills Corporation bought the mall from Gator Investments in September 2002, and announced that the property would undergo further redevelopment, along with a name change to Cincinnati Mills. As part of the redevelopment, Mills forced out many small independent businesses. Renovations began in January 2003, which included new paint, floors, and signage throughout, along with differently-themed decor for each wing of the mall, typical of properties developed by Mills at the time.

Elder-Beerman announced the closure of its store in 2003, as the chain wanted to focus on smaller stores in markets with lower populations. After a $70 million renovation project, the mall reopened officially as Cincinnati Mills in August 2004. As part of Mills' development, Babies "R" Us replaced Stein Mart, and Johnny's Toys opened in the upper level of the former Elder-Beerman, while the older Super Saver theater was sold to the local theater chain Danbarry and renamed the Dollar Saver. Inline tenants at this point were focused mainly on discount stores and amenities suitable for families, as was typical of other properties developed by Mills. By January 2005, the mall had 90% occupancy. As part of Mills' partnership with PBS, Cincinnati Mills featured the PBS Kids Backyard. FRCH Design Worldwide was hired as architect for the renovation.

Despite these renovations, the mall's tenancy began to slump again in 2006. This included the loss of Media Play, which went out of business entirely, and Johnny's Toys, which was closed so that Steve & Barry's could create a larger store using the entirety of the former Elder-Beerman store. In addition, the president of Bigg's reported that their store in the mall had constantly struggled in sales due to it being located at the back of the property. Also contributing to the decline were continued competition with Northgate and Tri-County malls, along with a newer outdoor mall called Bridgewater Falls in nearby Hamilton; lower-class demographics surrounding the mall; shopper unfamiliarity with the specialty tenants within; bankruptcy filings of key tenants; and complications from an accounting scandal in which the Mills Corporation was involved. Simon Property Group and Farallon Capital Management acquired the Mills portfolio for $1.64 billion in April 2007.

=== 2008–2025: Decline and closure ===
Bigg's closed in June 2008, shortly after Berean Christian Stores and Wonderpark. North Star Realty acquired the mall from Simon in January 2009. It proposed converting portions of the mall to office space, call centers, or other non-retail uses, and renamed the property Cincinnati Mall in March. The renaming was because of the mall's shift to include non-retail use, along with Simon trademarking the "Mills" name. Under North Star's ownership, Steve & Barry's vacated due to the chain going out of business, while Saks Off 5th, Guess, Lane Bryant, and Dress Barn relocated to a newly built outlet mall in Monroe. Despite the loss of these stores and other inline tenants such as MasterCuts and GNC, Totes Isotoner operated a temporary 30,000-square-foot (2,800 m^{2}) warehouse store in a vacated slot near the food court. In addition, the owners had not been paying their property taxes. Cincinnati Holding Company, a subsidiary of World Properties, purchased the mall in 2010, right as Showcase Cinemas closed.

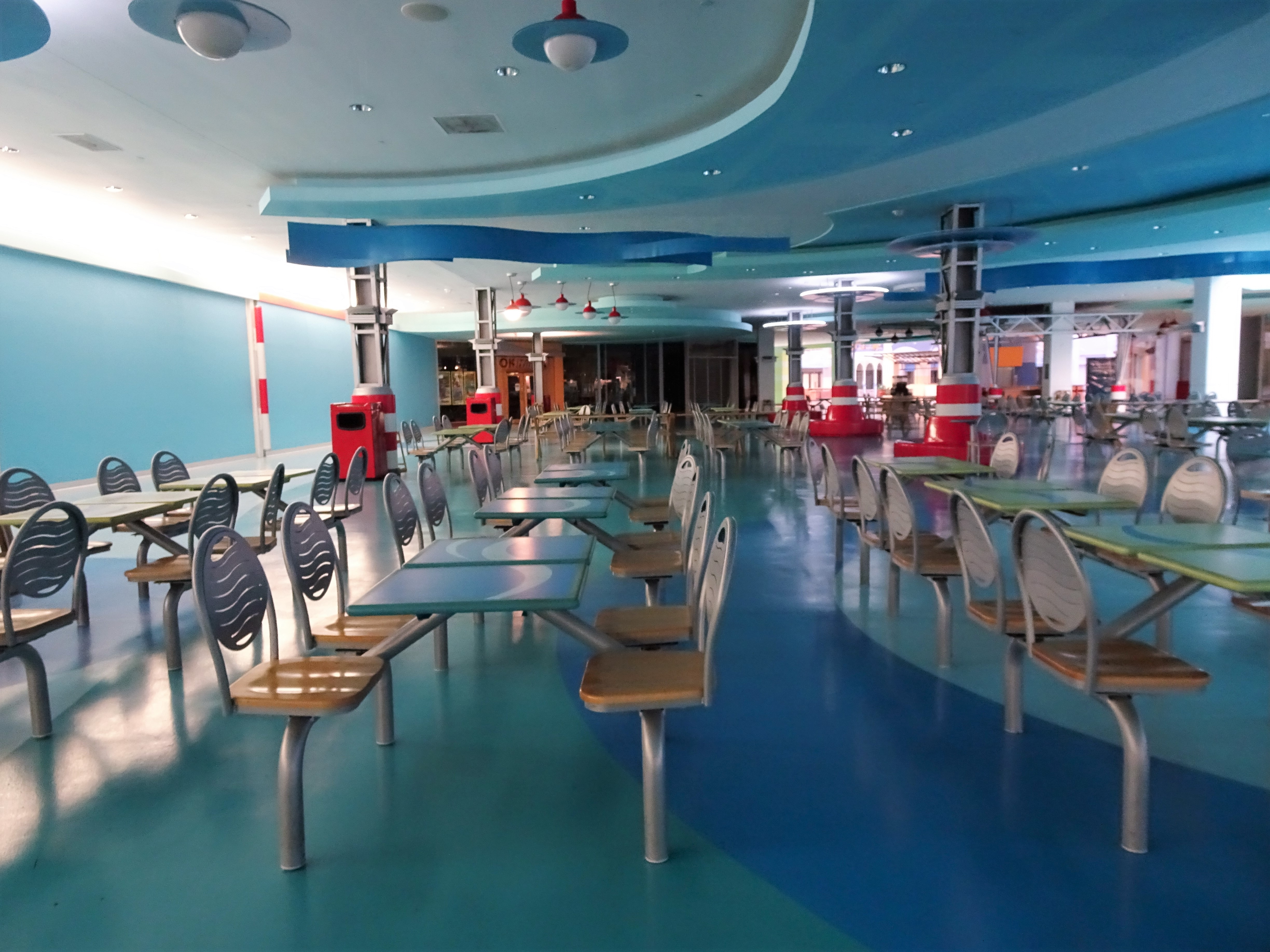
Nautical-themed Picnic On The River food court in May 2018

Three local business owners announced plans in 2011 to open ice skating rinks in the vacated Bigg's. By this time, Guitar Center had also closed, and a studio was proposed for its space, while a hotel was slated for the space originally occupied by Elder-Beerman. Bass Pro Shops announced it would relocate to West Chester Township in 2013; that year, the mall was again renamed Forest Fair Village. Burlington moved out in 2013, and Danbarry Dollar Saver closed in 2014. The proposed relocation of Bass Pro Shops, combined with the ongoing tax delinquency, delayed any further redevelopment. A plan to redevelop with Prudential Commercial Real Estate fell through in 2014 when that company's listing agreement expired. By 2017, only Kohl's, Bass Pro Shops, an arcade, and a children's entertainment complex remained in operation. A brokerage team put the mall on sale in 2017. In mid-2017, a Christian media company expressed interest in using part of the property as a studio.

Inspectors from the City of Forest Park cited the building for several code violations involving vandalism and safety issues throughout 2020, including sealed emergency exits and graffiti. At the same time, Cincinnati news station WCPO-TV began investigating the mall after viewers noted that Amazon Prime delivery trucks were using the structure's parking lot to stage deliveries. In 2022, officials from Butler and Hamilton counties submitted a request to the state of Ohio for $9.5 million to demolish the mall. They also began negotiating with Kohl's and Bass Pro Shops regarding the future redevelopment of the site. According to the Butler County Journal-News, demolition plans were dependent upon the availability of state funding, and one proposal envisioned redeveloping the property for light industrial use.

As redevelopment efforts were being considered, Arcade Legacy, one of the last remaining tenants, moved out in September 2022. A month later, WLWT reported that the mall was slated for demolition along with 825 other buildings across Ohio, as part of Governor Mike DeWine's Ohio Building Demolition and Site Revitalization Program. On December 2, 2022, the City of Forest Park Fire Department ordered the closure of all remaining businesses inside the mall, with the exception of Kohl's and Bass Pro Shops, citing several fire code violations, including a nonfunctional sprinkler system. Bass Pro Shops remained open as a separate anchor tenant until January 2024, when it closed its Forest Fair Village store and relocated to a larger location near Interstate 75 in West Chester. Kohl's subsequently became the mall's sole remaining tenant before announcing in January 2025 that its Forest Fair store would close as part of a nationwide plan to shutter 27 underperforming locations. The store closed in April 2025, leaving the mall entirely vacant.

=== 2025–present: Redevelopment ===
On May 21, 2025, the City of Forest Park approved Hillwood Investment Group's proposal to redevelop the former Forest Fair Village site as an industrial park. Hillwood acquired 55 acres (22 ha) of the property in August 2025, while World Properties retained ownership of the remainder of the site.

Demolition of the mall began on September 21, 2025. By February 2026, most of the complex had been demolished, with only the former Kohl's and Media Play buildings remaining. The final structures were razed on March 6, 2026.

Construction of the industrial park was scheduled to begin in May 2026, with an estimated completion of mid-2027. Plans call for a 715,736-square-foot (66,494.1 m^{2}) Class-A distribution facility for the Hillman Group, along with an expansion pad providing an additional 162,000 square feet (15,100 m^{2}) of industrial space. A groundbreaking ceremony was held on June 16, 2026.

== Gallery ==
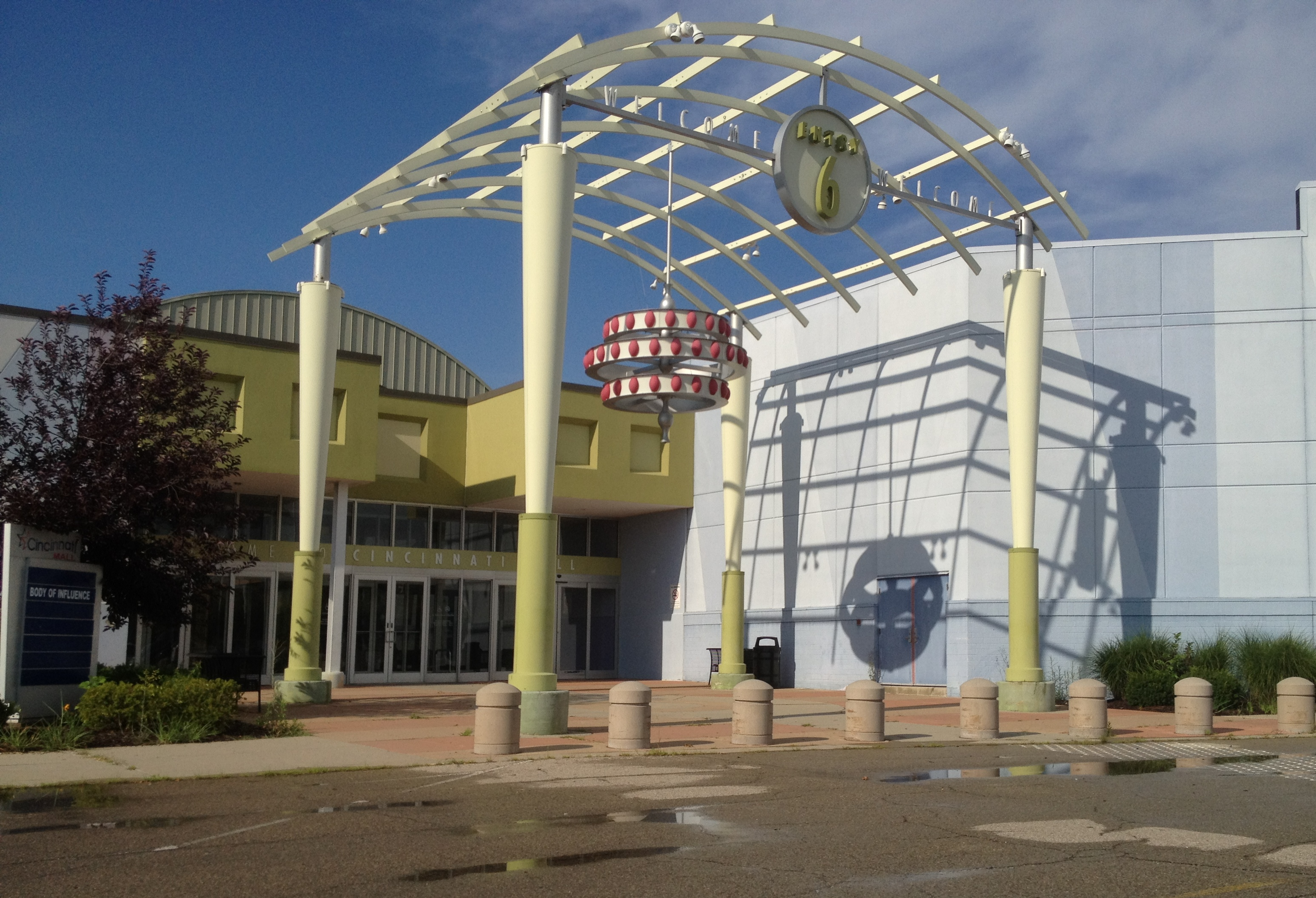
Entry 6 (July 2013)

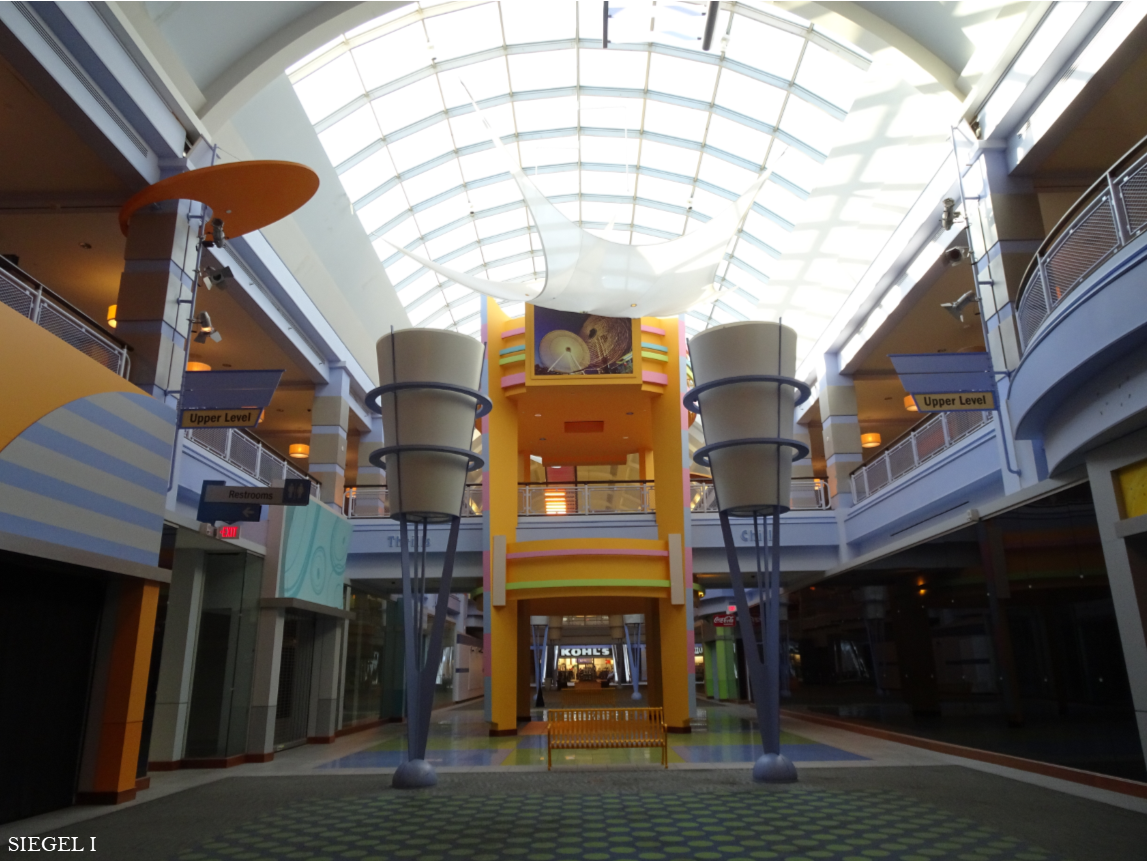
Kohl's wing (May 2018)

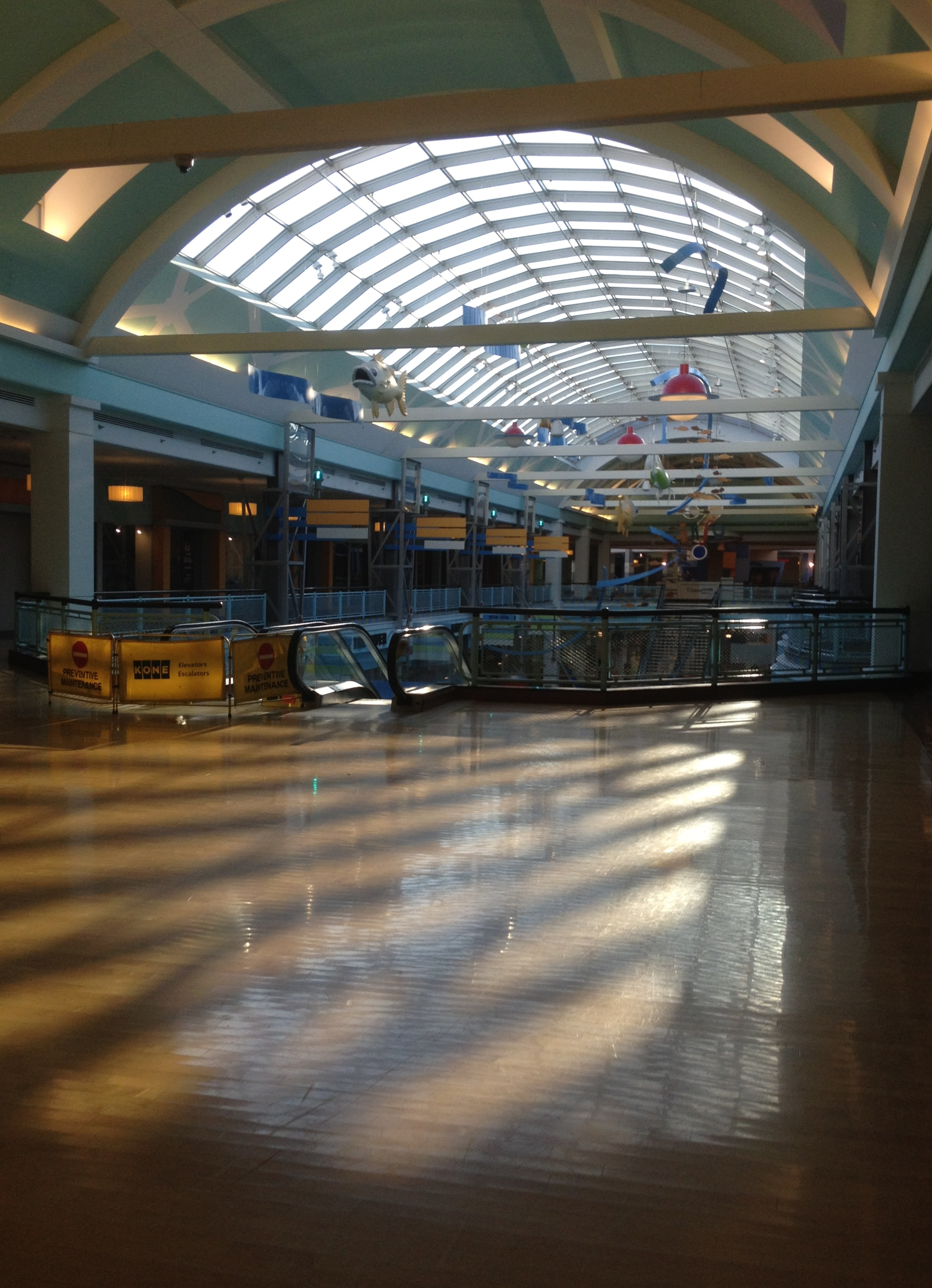
Largely vacant second floor (July 2013)

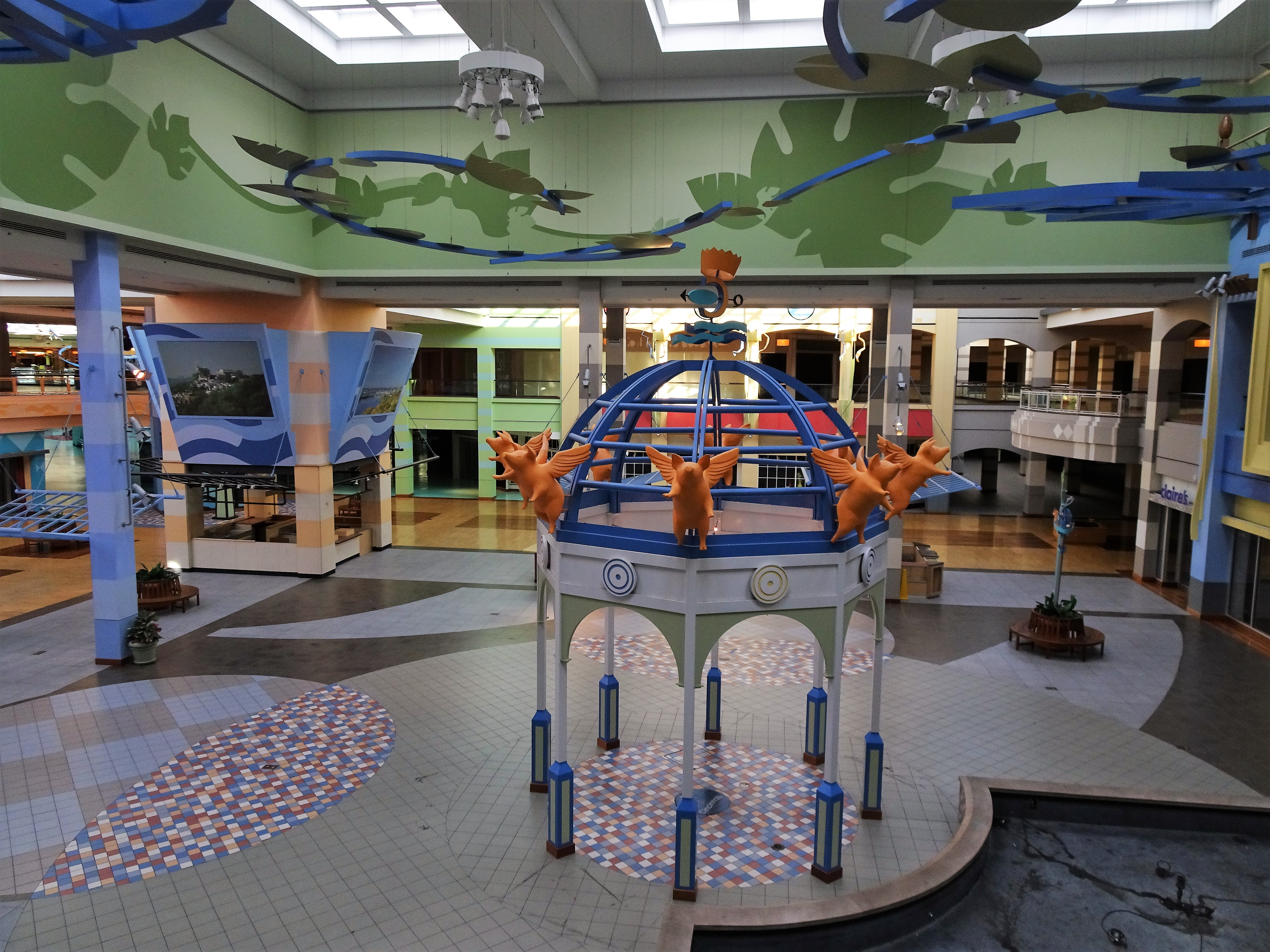
Center court (May 2018)

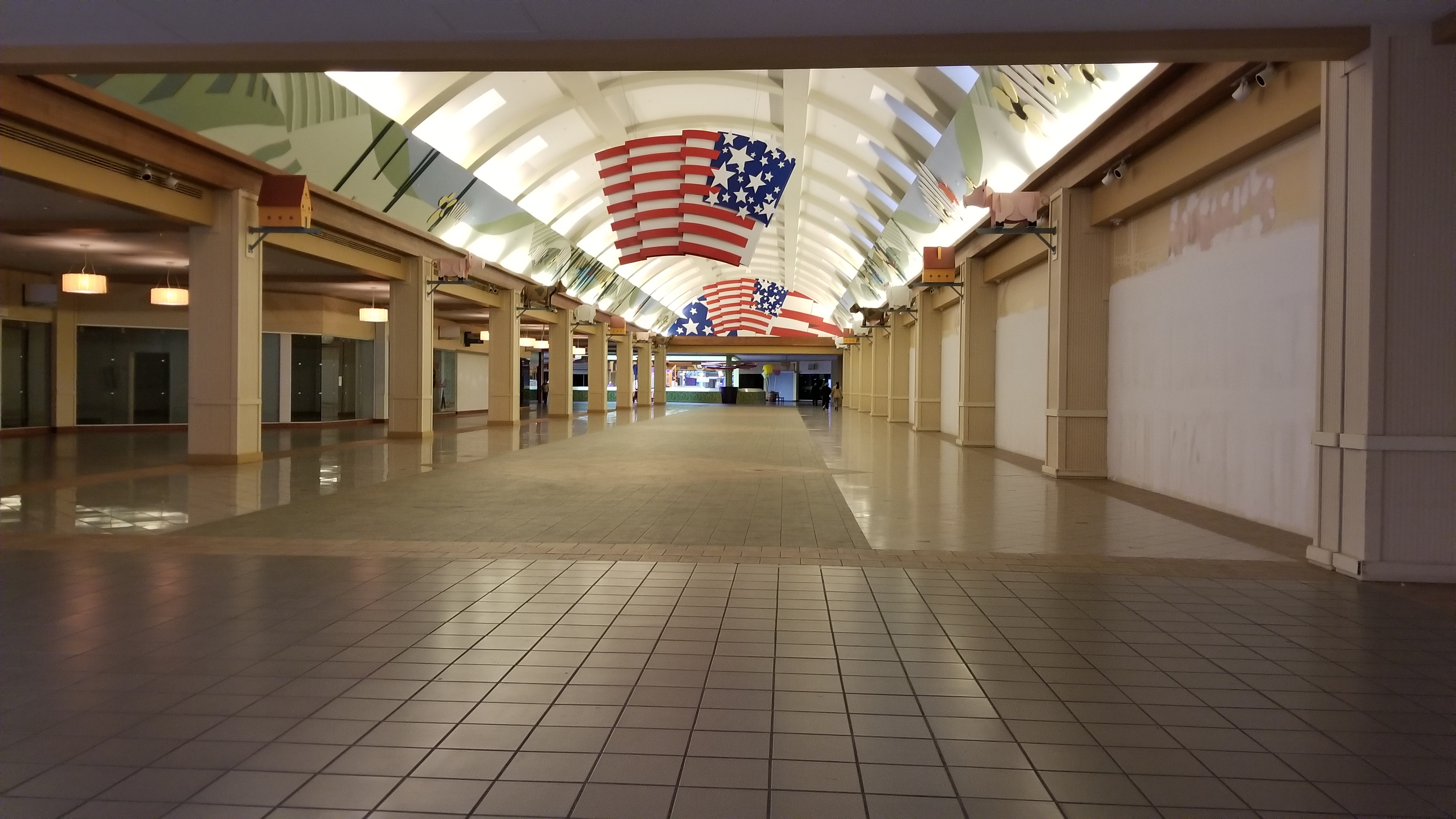
Empty concourse (November 2018)

== See also ==
- Retail apocalypse
- Richland Mall (South Carolina), a defunct mall in South Carolina also developed by LJ Hooker
- Rolling Acres Mall, in Akron, Ohio, demolished in 2017
- Chapel Hill Mall in Akron, Ohio, closed in 2021
- St. Louis Mills, another former Mills Corporation mall that was closed and redeveloped, alongside Pittsburgh Mills and Franklin Mall, which are also failing
