= Richland Mall (South Carolina) =

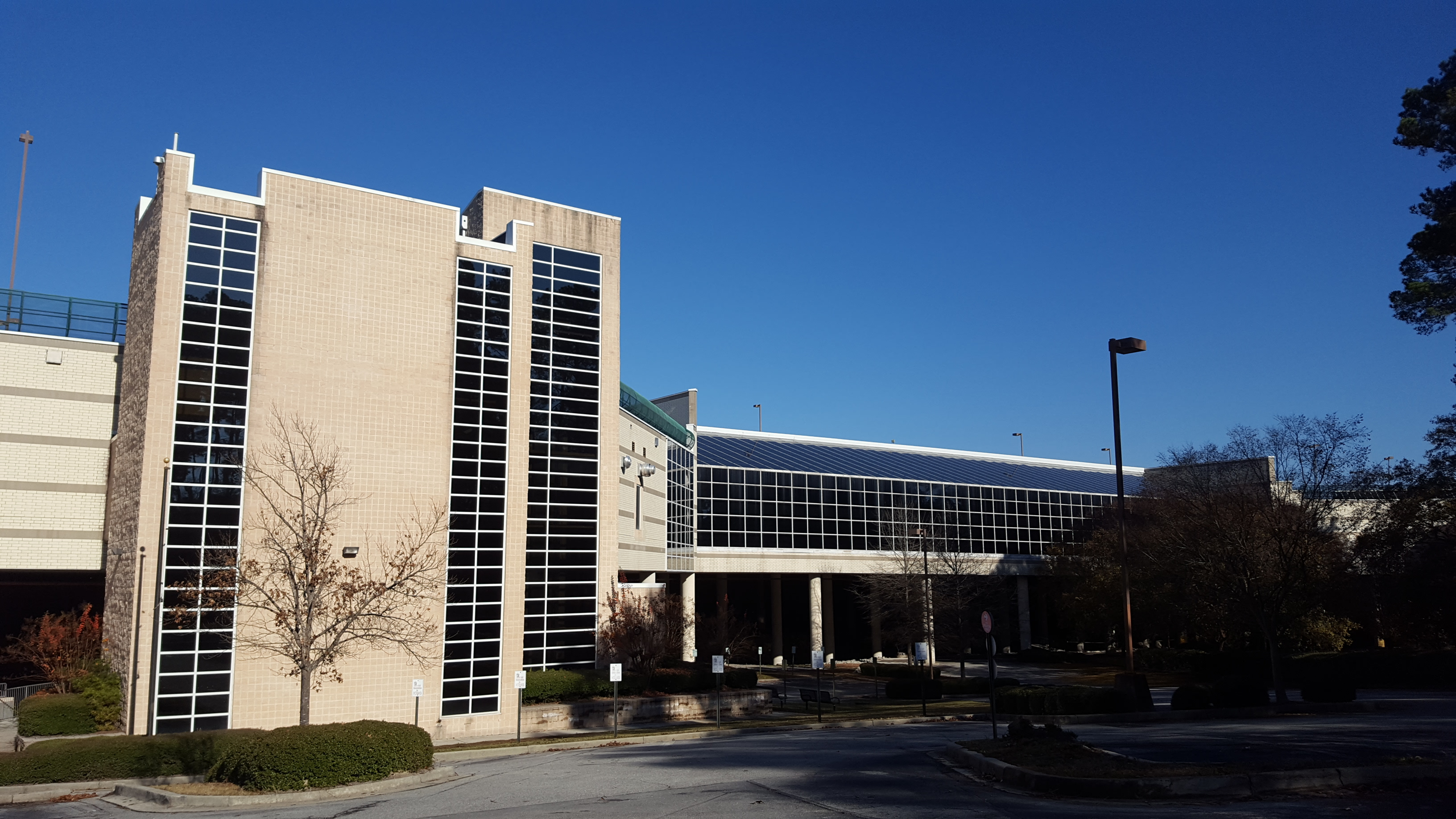
- Exterior view of Richland Mall, December 2017
- Location: Forest Acres, South Carolina, United States
- Coordinates: 34.0168°N 80.9903°W
- Address: 3400 Forest Drive
- Opened: 1961
- Closed: early 2022 (interior); December 31, 2023 (final retailer)
- Developer: LJ Hooker
- Manager: Southeastern Development
- Owner: Southeastern Development
- Num. of stores: 0
- Num. of anchor tenants: 0 (3 at peak)
- Floor area: 713,992 square feet (66,332.0 m^{2}) (GLA)
- Floors: 2 (partial third level, 3 in former Belk)
- Website: www.richlandmallsc.com

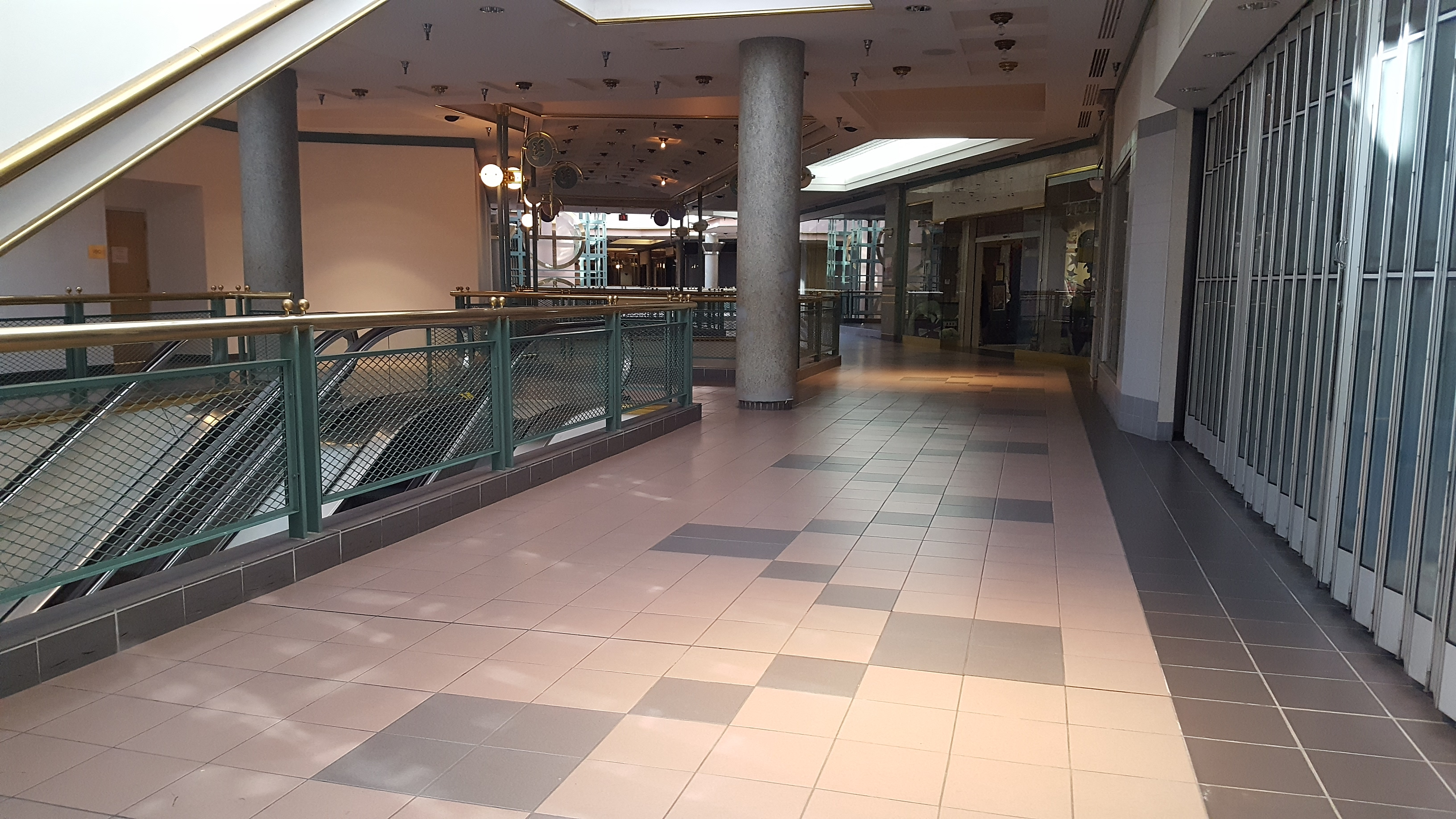
Interior view of largely vacant mall, December 2017

Richland Mall was an enclosed shopping mall near the intersection of Forest Drive and Beltline Blvd in Forest Acres, South Carolina within the greater Columbia Metropolitan Area. The interior mall space has been closed to the public since early 2022. However, its last anchor store, Belk, continued to operate until early September 2023. A Barnes & Noble continued to operate as a junior anchor with its own exterior access until December 31, 2023. There are two additional empty anchor stores (formerly Dillard's and Parisian) that have both been largely vacant since the late 2000s. The mall's last inline tenant, Columbia Children's Theatre, moved out on February 1, 2023. The mall has never received a major renovation and has an ornate late 1980s-early 1990s interior aesthetic. The mall is currently undergoing demolition as of October 2024.

== History ==
=== Original Mall (1961-1987) ===
Richland Mall opened on November 2, 1961 as the first mall in Columbia. It was an open-air mall, typical of first-generation malls from the mid-twentieth century, and anchored by J.B. White, a major department store based in Augusta, Georgia, that was prevalent in South Carolina. A movie theater was also on a southeastern outlot of the mall. Among the original twenty-seven stores were Winn-Dixie, Eckerd, and Woolworth. By the 1980s, Richland Mall's open-air mall concept was considered outdated and by that time there was significant competition in the market from newer indoor malls such as Dutch Square and especially Columbia Mall. In the late 80s, L. J. Hooker bought the complex with plans of converting it into not only a much larger indoor mall but also making it a high-end shopping destination unparalleled in the region. The stores remaining in the original Richland Mall had their leases terminated in 1987 with the exception of the J.B. White, which the new mall would be built around. Two outparcels would also be unaffected. Winn-Dixie would be one of the last stores to close on December 23, 1987, before the massive redevelopment project got underway.

=== Richland Fashion Mall (1988-1996) ===
The mall was renamed Richland Fashion Mall and was built in two major phases. The first phase included a two-level wing extending from the current J.B. White to a new anchor store, Bonwit Teller, which opened in October 1988. The second phase of the mall opened in November 1989, and included another two-level wing extending from the other side of J.B. White to end at another new anchor: Parisian. Both Bonwit Teller and Parisian were new to not only Columbia, but all of South Carolina. A large four-level parking garage was built that covered most of the front of the mall, as well as the entire length of the roof being made accessible to parking as well to combat the fact that the mall was already on a small plot of land, and the expansion had made traditional parking almost impossible. J.B. White was also expanded during this time to include a third level. A relocation for the movie theater opened on top of this in 1990, known as the Litchfield Theatres Litchfield 7. The mall also included a large aviation-themed food court that wrapped around the backside of J.B. White on the upper level. The food court made it possible to avoid the walk-thru of J.B. White to get from one side of the mall to the other. A TGI Fridays was also a part of the rebirth of the mall. A few of the stores that had locations in the original Richland Mall reopened once the redevelopment was complete including S&S Cafeteria and Eckerd. Woolworth also opened a "Woolworth's Express" on the upper level.

The mall struggled with customer traffic and management/financial problems from the very beginning. LJ Hooker, who developed the mall, was in serious debt and filed for bankruptcy in 1989. In recent years, the company had gained majority controlling interest in four department stores including Bonwit Teller and Parisian. Parisian's original owners bought it back from LJ Hooker, but Bonwit Teller was mostly liquidated along with the American operations of LJ Hooker. Bonwit Teller closed in August 1990, leaving an empty anchor in a still practically brand-new mall. In 1993 Dillard's opened in the former anchor space and expanded the store significantly. The mall was still underperforming however and was nearly half-vacant. In 1995, the Litchfield Theater became a Regal Cinemas.

=== Changes (1996-1999) ===
In the late 1990s, the mall underwent a series of small renovations. The first of these occurred in 1996 when the mall's name changed back to simply Richland Mall. The grand entrance stating "Richland Fashion Mall" was demolished and replaced with a new facade. In 1997 a Barnes & Noble opened next to the new main entrance of the mall. TGI Fridays was also relocated from the Parisian wing to the Dillard's wing on the side of the new mall entrance, opposite Barnes & Noble. In 1998 J.B. White's parent company, Mercantile Stores, was bought by Dillard's. As part of the Dillard's/Belk store swap in malls that already had a Dillard's, the J.B. White became Belk in September 1998. In 1999, the large, aviation-themed food court was closed and relocated to the lower level on the Parisian end of the mall. The original food court would be refurbished into a call center.

=== 2000s ===
Into the new millennium, the mall continued to decline. Dillard's closed their store in 2003. Since then, it has operated as Blacklion- a furniture store based in Charlotte, and a store simply called "The Department Store." Later, it also operated briefly as a ping-pong club. The mall had changed hands several times over the years, and in 2005 was purchased by Peerless Development Group. They planned an extensive renovation and renamed Richland Mall to Midtown at Forest Acres. Nothing ever came of their aspirations for the property though. They defaulted on their mall loan and by 2007 the mall was back up for sale. Parisian left around this time, closing in February 2007. In April 2009, the Columbia Children's Theatre relocated to Richland. They moved into the retail space that had previously been an Express clothing store. In summer 2017, they moved downstairs into the space where Eckerd drug used to be.

=== 2010-Present ===
In April 2010, the mall was sold to Century Capitol Group who brought on Kahn Development Company in an attempt to breathe new life into the mall. The first thing they did was change the name from Midtown at Forest Acres back to Richland Mall.

On January 30, 2011, S&S Cafeteria departed Richland Mall and was replaced by locally owned Sadie's American Cafeteria. Sadie's closed and in 2013 the space was occupied by Jackson Family Cafeteria, a buffet that closed in 2016.

In March 2013, TGI Fridays departed Richland Mall and was replaced with The Seafood Academy which closed in 2016.

In 2018, Gymboree permanently closed its Richland Mall location, after 20 years of business.

CivvieSupply, a premium patriotic and military-inspired clothing brand, opened a fulfillment center in the mall in 2019.

In February 2022, Regal Cinema's Regal Columbia 7 closed its rooftop location at the mall and the inline mall itself was locked to the public shortly thereafter.

In September 2023, Belk closed after 25 years in business. Including its run as J.B. White, the store was in continuous operation for 62 years.

On December 31, 2023, Barnes and Noble closed ahead of opening a new store in March 2024 in a former Bed Bath & Beyond in the nearby Shoppes at Woodhill shopping center. Barnes & Noble was the final retail store to leave the mall.

On March 20, 2024, demolition of the mall began. During the demolition, workers discovered a time capsule that had been placed there during construction. It was buried instead in a nearby park so it could be reopened on January 20, 2033.

=== Future ===
In late 2022, it was announced that the mall was in the process of being purchased by Augusta-based Southeastern Development and would be demolished and redeveloped. Tentative plans included refurbishing the former Parisian anchor store for Belk to move into so that afterward the original J.B.White/current Belk would be demolished along with the rest of the mall. A grocery store is planned as the other anchor store. Other plans include apartments, a park, and a brewery or tap room. Developers estimate it will take four to five years before the first phase of the project will be completed, which will include the mixed retail, apartments, and a grocery store. A second phase should take about an equal amount of time to complete which will include mixed-use retail on the east side of the property as well as a second set of apartments. However, on August 9, 2023, it was announced that Belk would no longer be part of the mall redevelopment, and would be closing, which would leave the mall with no anchors. Only one day later, on August 10, 2023, it was announced that Barnes & Noble would be relocating leaving the mall completely vacant.

== Gallery ==
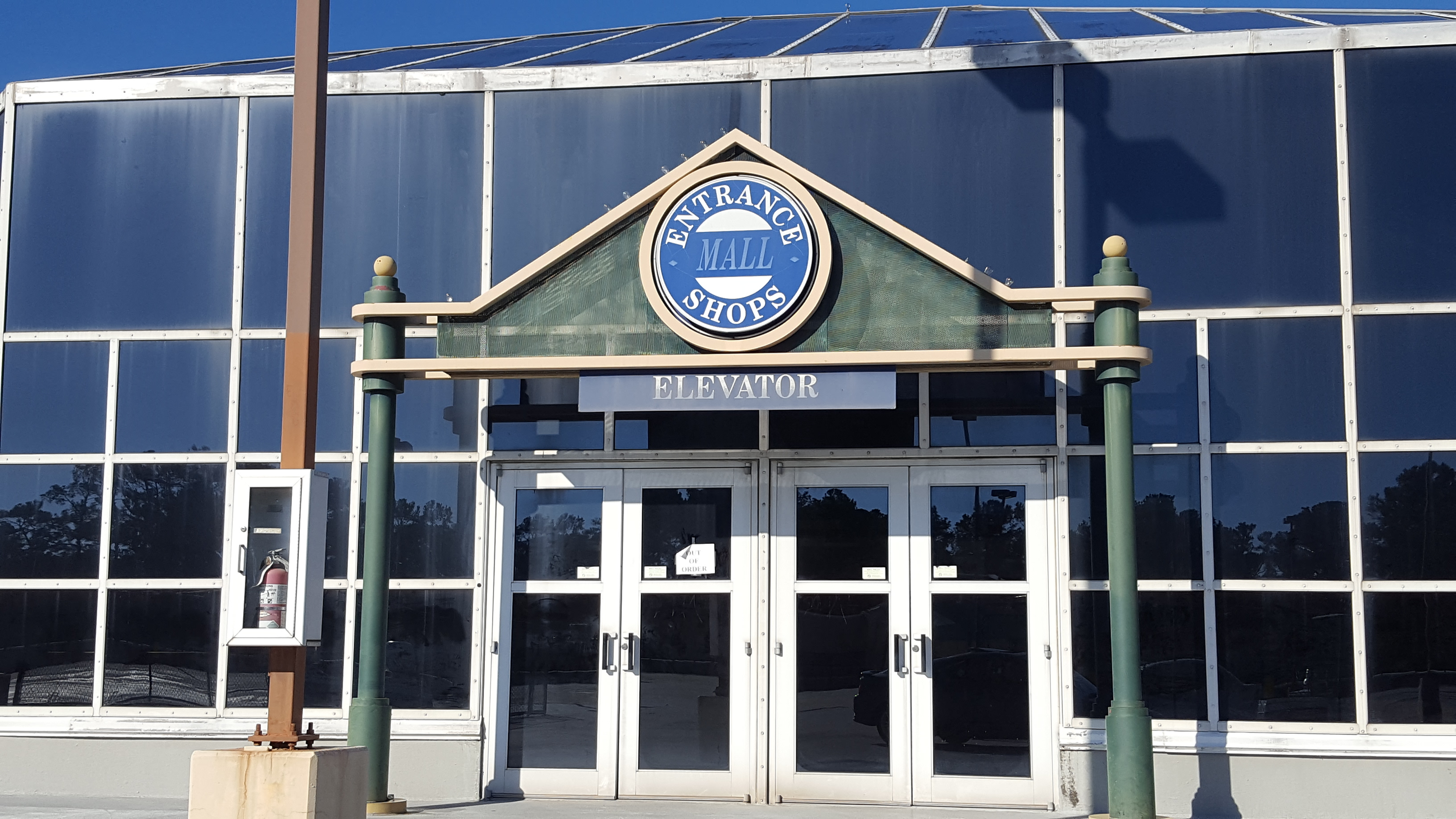
Entrance

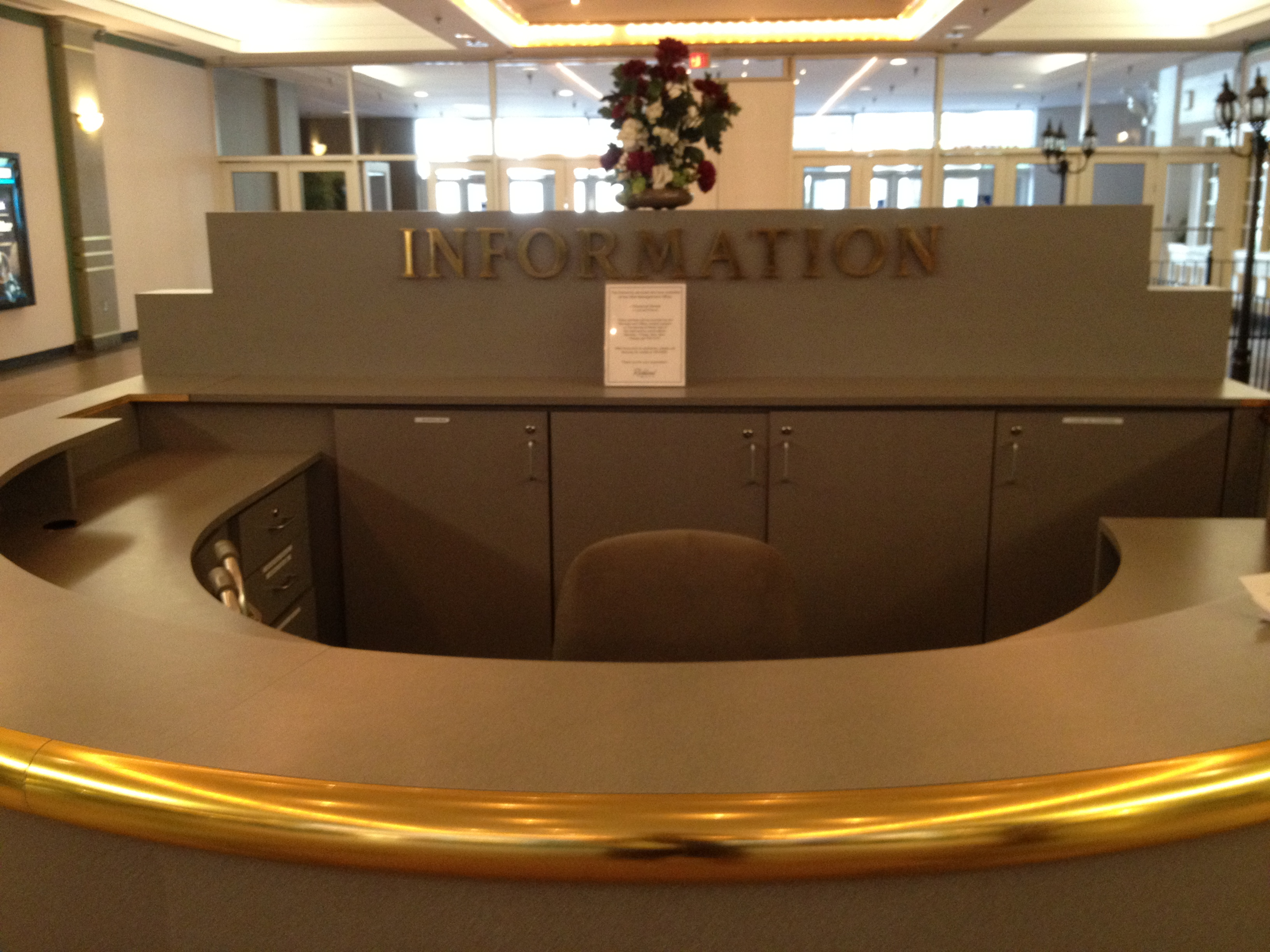
Information desk

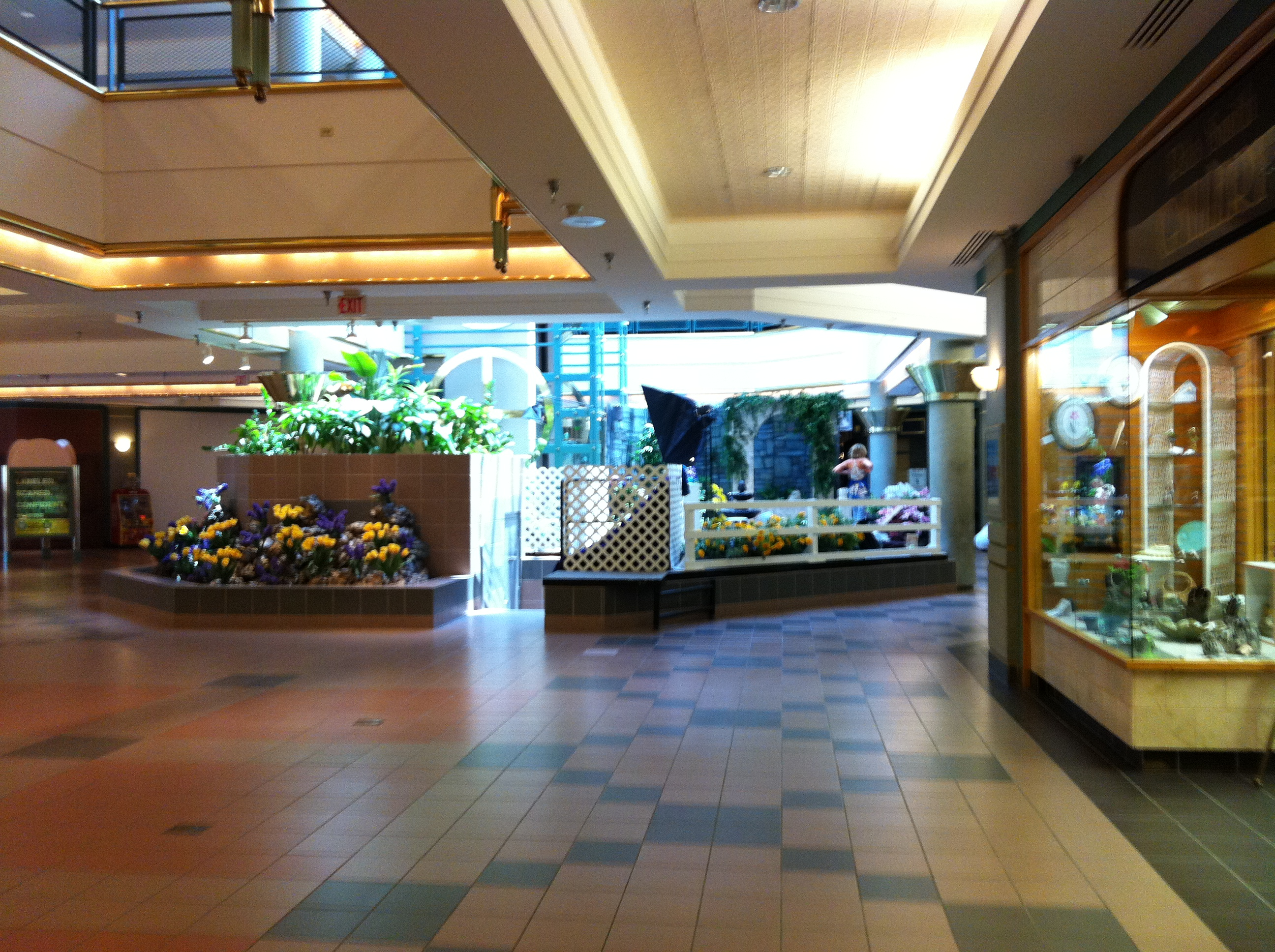
Former fountain area

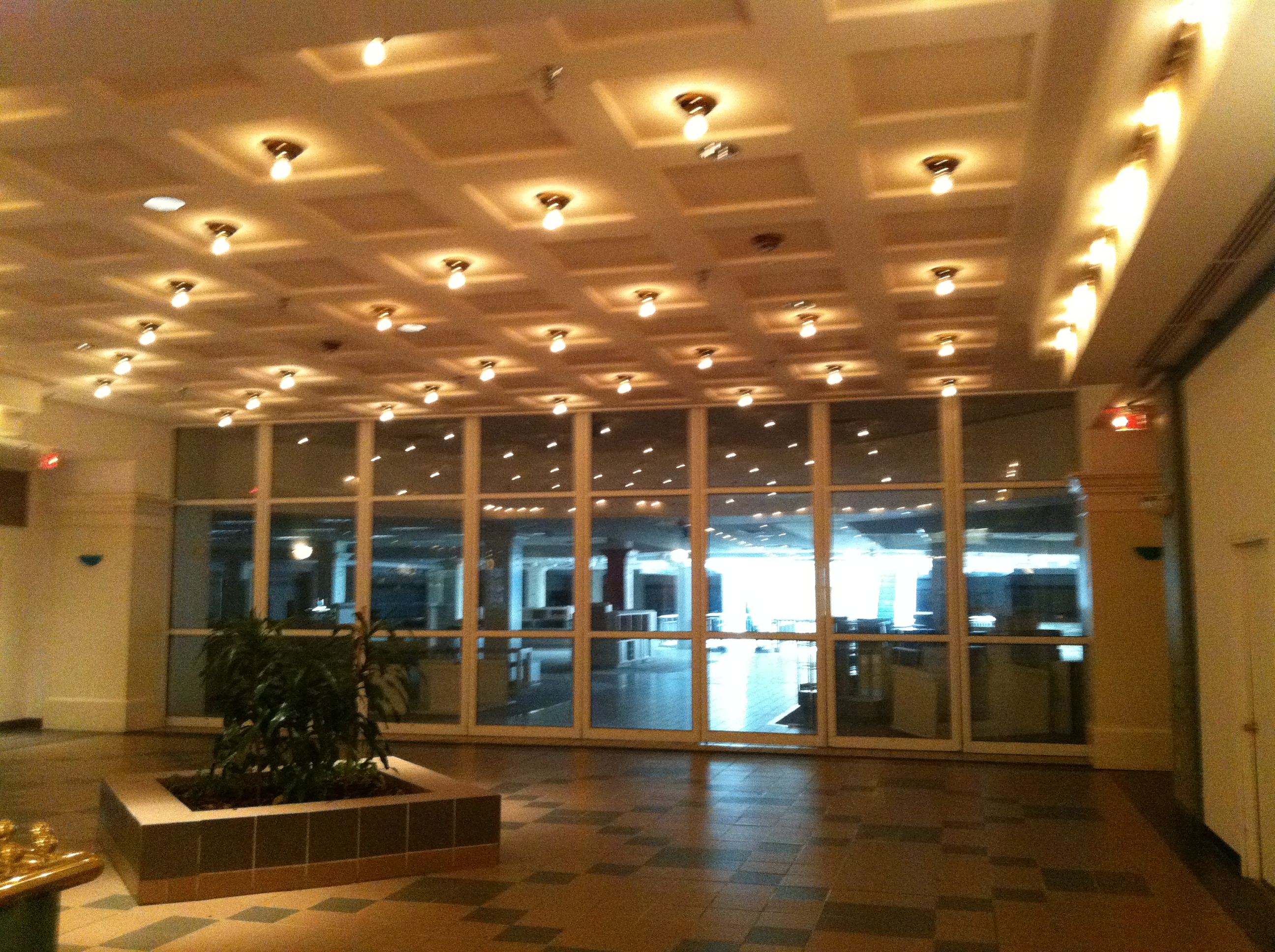
Former Parisians

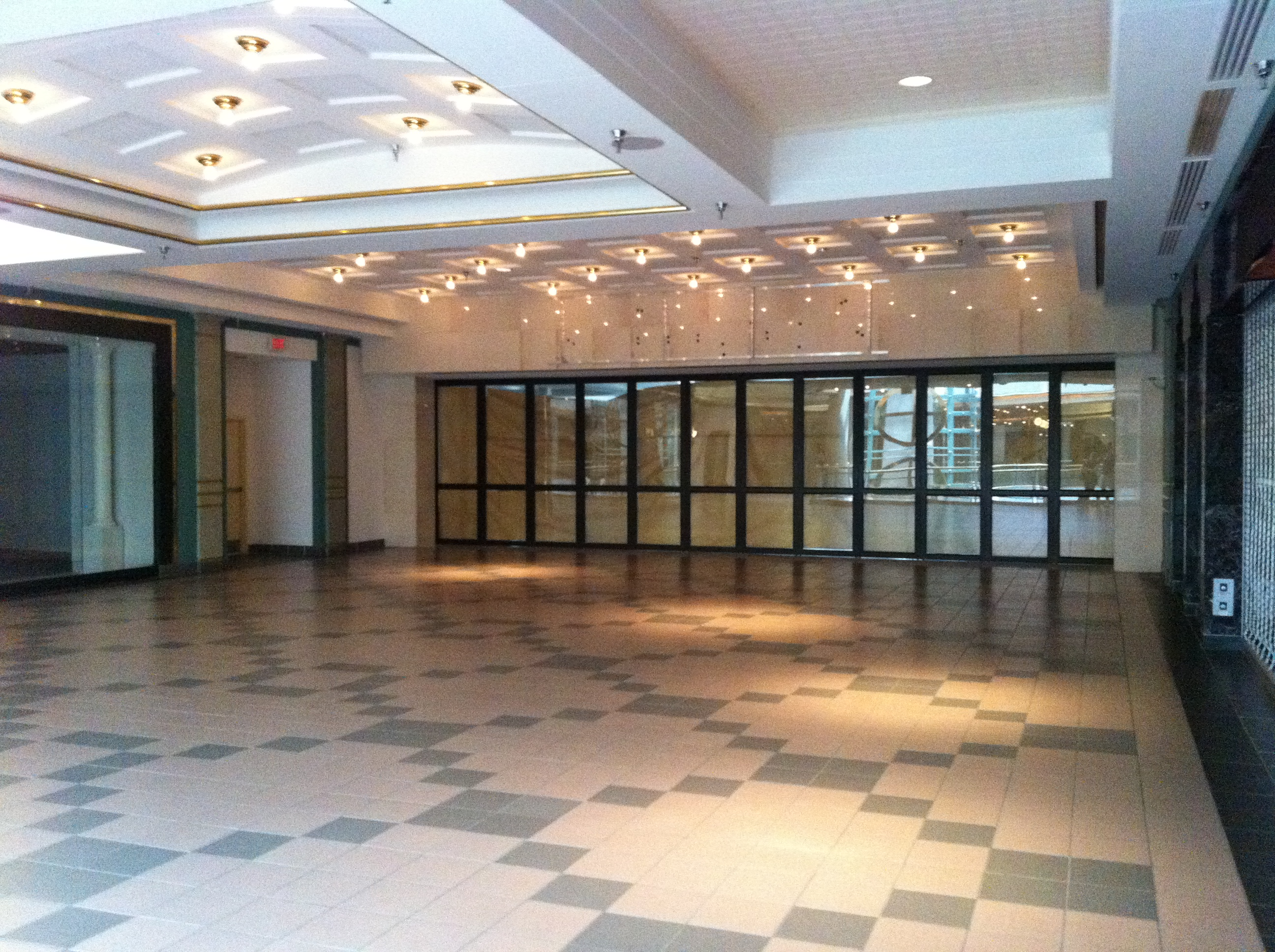
Former Dillards

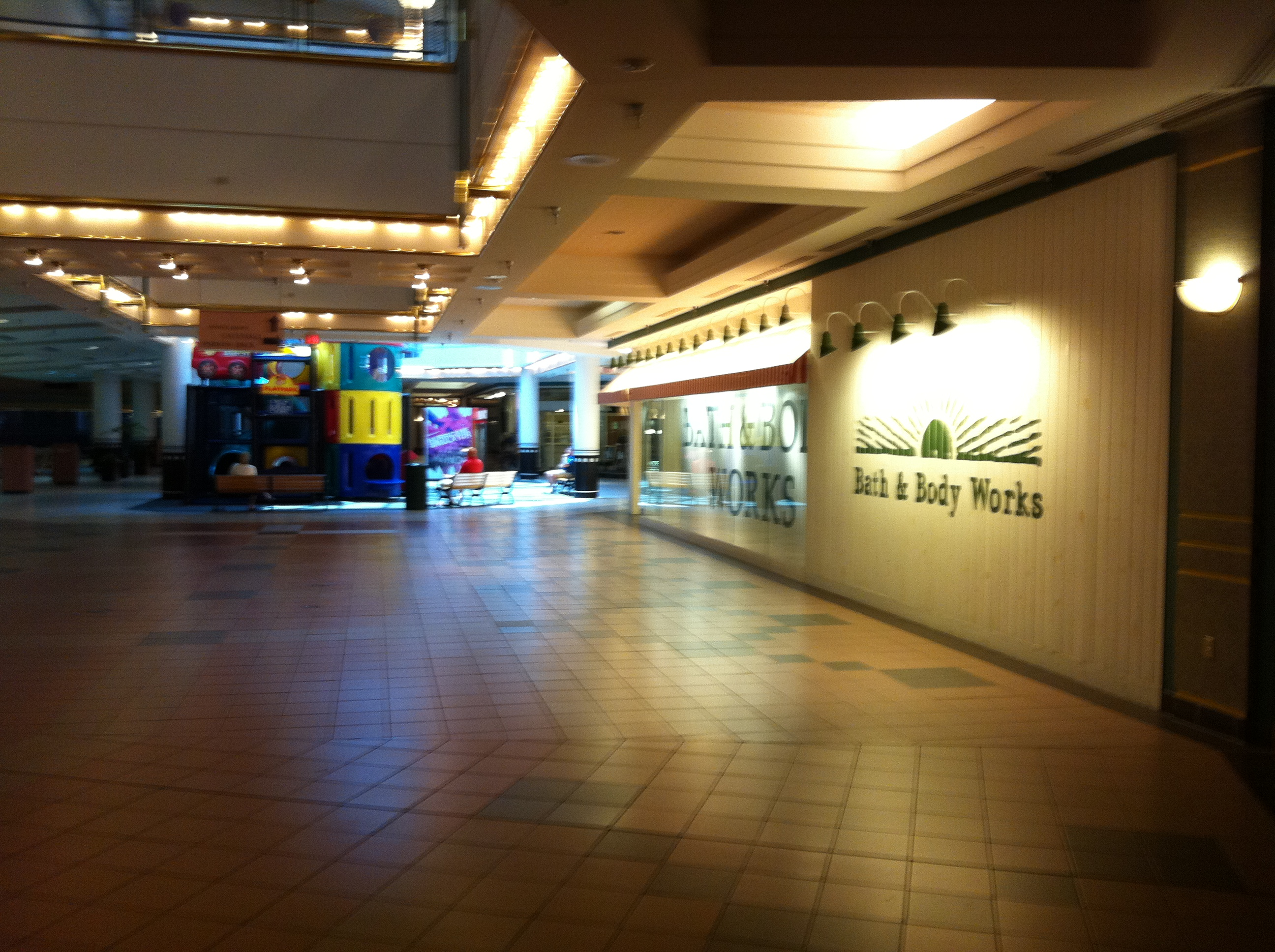
Former Bath & Body Works

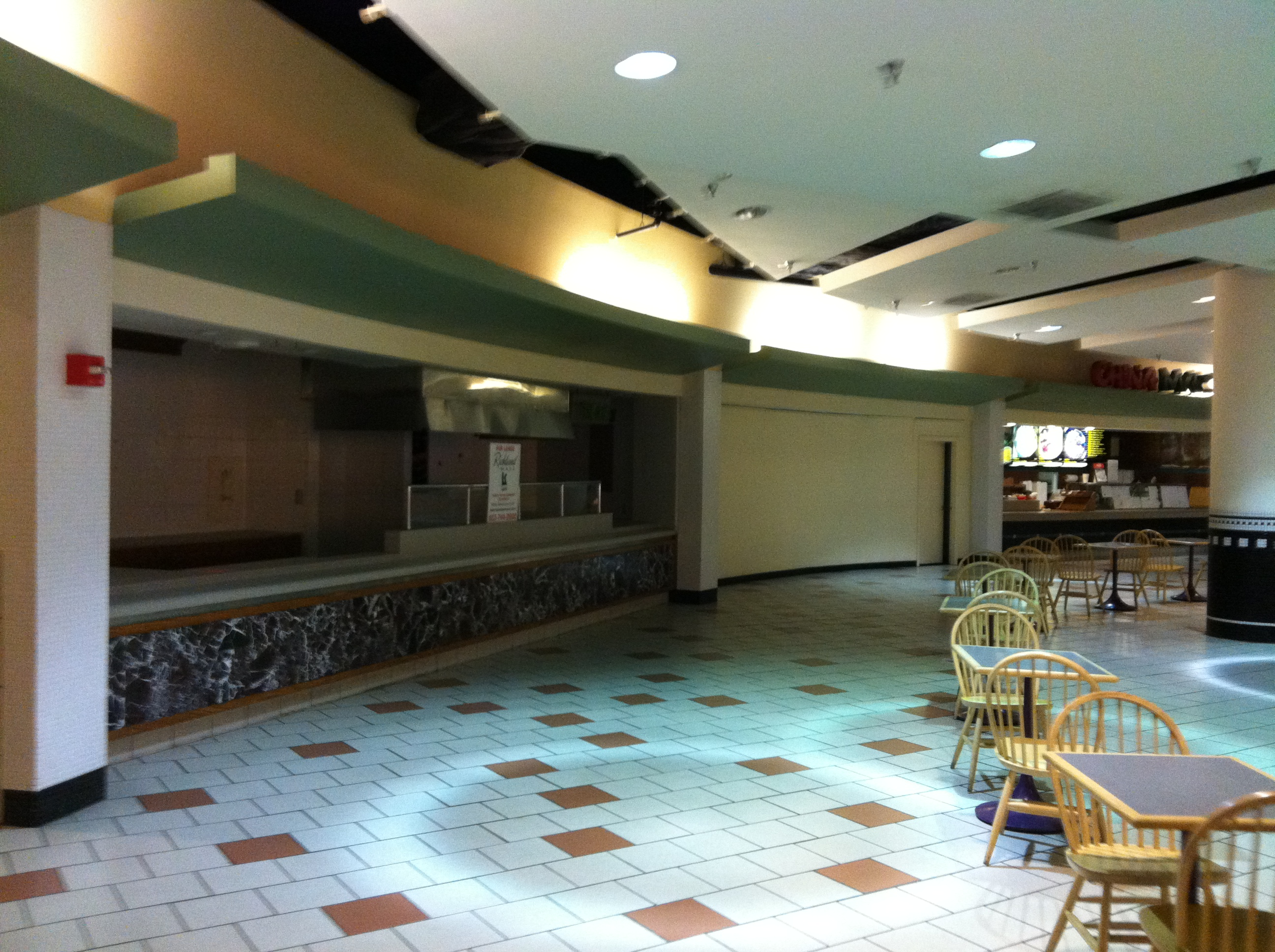
Food court

== See also ==
- LJ Hooker
- Forest Fair Village, a larger defunct mall in Ohio also developed by LJ Hooker
