= Tri-County Mall =

Defunct mall in Springdale, Ohio, U.S.

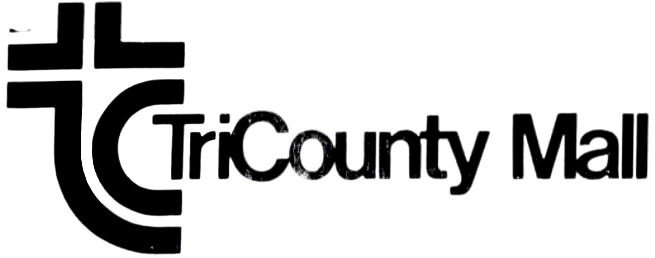

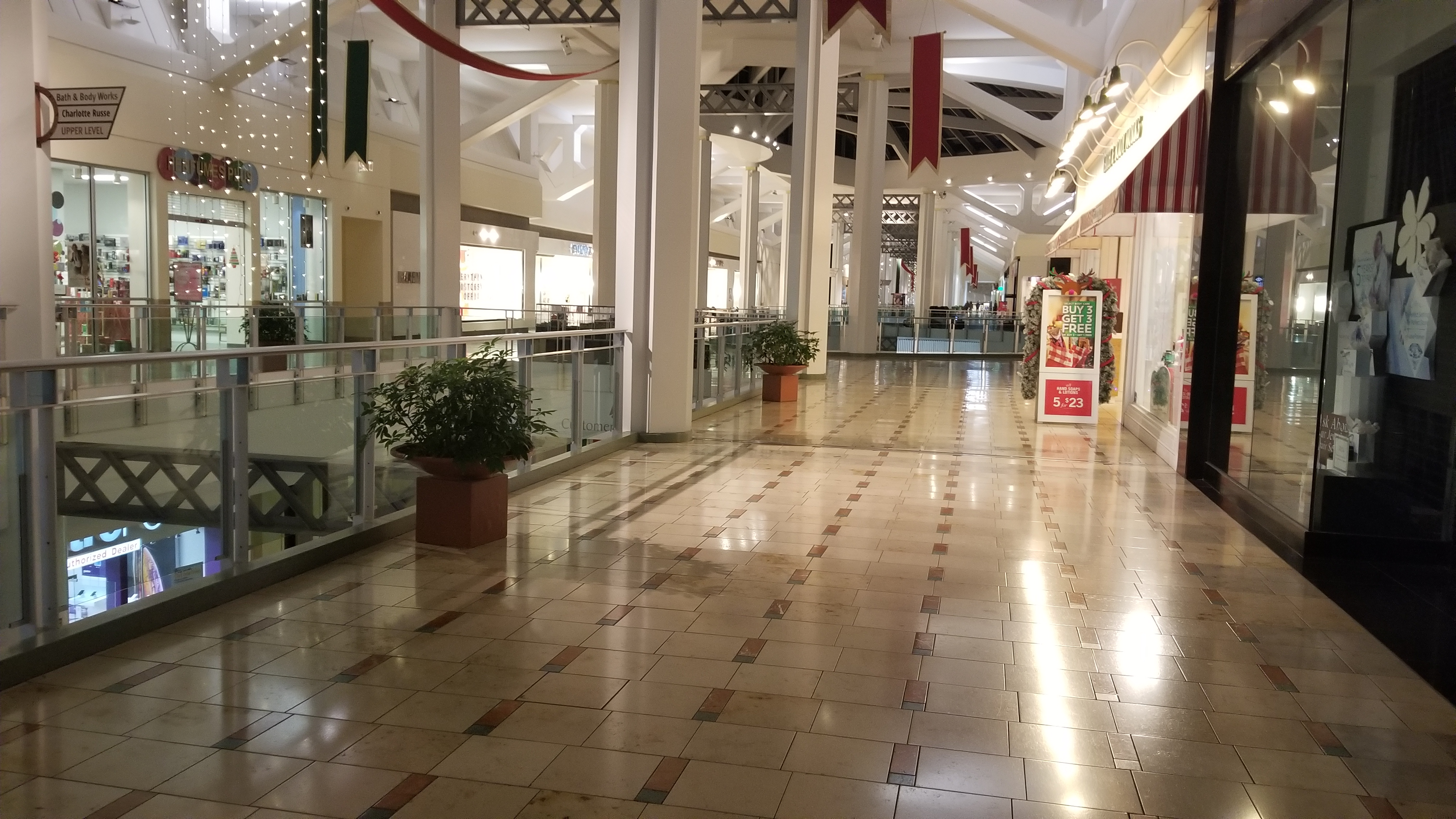
- A wing of Tri-County Mall in 2018.
- Location: Springdale, Ohio, U.S.
- Coordinates: 39°17′24″N 84°27′52″W
- Address: 11700 Princeton Pike
- Opened: July 21, 1960
- Closed: May 15, 2022
- Previous names: Tri-County Center
- Developer: Joseph Meyerhoff
- Manager: MarketSpace Capital, Park Harbor Capital
- Owner: MarketSpace Capital, Park Harbor Capital
- Architect: Kenneth C. Miller
- Num. of stores: 130
- Num. of anchor tenants: 4
- Floor area: 1,300,000 square feet (120,000 m^{2})
- Floors: 2 (3 in former Dillard's, 4 in former Macy's)
- Public transit: Metro
- Website: (2022 Archive)

Tri-County Mall, originally Tri-County Center, was a shopping mall located on State Route 747 (Princeton Pike) just south of Interstate 275 in the city of Springdale, Ohio, a suburb of Cincinnati, Ohio, United States. Originally known as Tri-County Shopping Center, it opened in 1960 and has been expanded several times in its history. The original shopping center was an open-air property featuring H. & S. Pogue Company (Pogue's) and John Shillito Company (Shillito's) as the anchor stores.

An enclosed wing anchored by Sears was added in 1969, followed by the enclosure of the rest of the mall. Shillito's was later known as Shillito-Rike's, Lazarus, Lazarus-Macy's, and then just Macy's; Pogue's was consolidated with L. S. Ayres and then converted to JCPenney. A mall expansion begun in 1990 and finished in 1992 added a second level of stores and McAlpin's (sold to Dillard's in 1998) as a fourth anchor store. The mall underwent a slow decline in the 21st century, owing mainly to the center's age and increased competition, and lost all of its anchors. Both JCPenney and Dillard's relocated to newer shopping centers in the 2010s, while Sears closed in 2018 and Macy's closed in 2021. The mall itself closed on May 15, 2022. It is owned by MarketSpace Capital and Park Harbor Capital.

== History ==
Joseph Meyerhoff, a real estate developer whose firm had built several shopping and residential properties in Baltimore, Maryland, announced plans for the Tri-County Center in 1959. The plans called for a shopping center with two Cincinnati-based department stores as the anchor stores: John Shillito Company (Shillito's) and H. & S. Pogue Company (Pogue's), positioned at the north and south ends respectively of an open-air mall concourse. Other tenants announced for the center included an S. S. Kresge Corporation dime store, a Kroger supermarket, and Gray Drug. Kenneth C. Miller was the mall's architect. Consulting firms helped select the mall's site, at the northeastern corner of Princeton Pike and Kemper Road in the suburb of Springdale, just south of the then-under construction Interstate 275 beltway, after determining that the area had the greatest potential for future suburban growth. Groundbreaking for the 75-acre (30 ha) site began in July 1959.

The mall officially opened to the public on July 21, 1960. Opening ceremonies included performances by the Princeton High School band and a ribbon-cutting ceremony hosted by Meyerhoff and the mayor of Springdale. At the time of opening, it consisted of 51 stores in 500,000 square feet (46,000 m^{2}) of shop space, with parking for up to 4,000 cars. A 1960 article in The Cincinnati Enquirer described the mall as "landscaped to give the appearance of a park", while also noting that it was the largest center built by Meyerhoff at the time. Shillito's added a fourth level to its store in 1962, allowing for the store's lowest level to be dedicated to discounted merchandise; this concept, called the "basement store", also existed at their location in downtown Cincinnati.

Sears opened as the mall's third anchor store in May 1967. The 142,300-square-foot (13,220 m^{2}), two-story store was a prototype for the chain, featuring a larger variety of merchandise and services than its typical stores of the era, including automotive repair and a restaurant. The new Sears was built to the east, and was connected to the rest of the mall by a wing of stores. Unlike the rest of the mall at the time, the expansion wing was enclosed, featuring palm trees, tropical plants, and fountains, along with antique lights and skylights. Tenants in this section of the mall included Casual Corner, Lane Bryant, Spencer Gifts, Hickory Farms, and Waldenbooks. In 1968, the rest of the formerly open-air mall was enclosed as well, featuring décor similar to the 1967 expansion. The firm of Baxter, Hodell, Donnelly, and Preston served as architects on the enclosure project.

=== 1970s and 1980s ===
Throughout the first several years of the mall's existence, the common mall space was used to host many annual events. This included the Outdoor Living Show, which allowed mall patrons to view campers, boats, patio furniture, and outdoor grills for purchase in the summertime; Safety Town, a five-day program hosted by Springdale's police and fire department to educate young children on traffic safety; and symphony concerts every August. All of these were included in the mall's tenth-anniversary festivities in 1970, along with a number of mall-wide sales and a teen fashion show held by Shillito's.

In 1974, the Pogue's store was expanded and remodeled, featuring circular patterns on the ceilings, and different color schemes in each department. The store also gained a third story in this remodel, creating space for home furnishings and a beauty salon. Further renovations came in 1976 when the main mall entrance was redecorated in earth tones, while also adding decorative fountains and eight kiosk shops. Also in 1976, original tenant Hader Hardware moved out of the mall to a bigger store on the periphery, which had originally been a tire and automotive department for Pogue's. Monumental Properties, the name which Meyerhoff's real estate division had assumed in 1970, sold the mall to Equitable Life Insurance (now AXA Equitable Holdings) for $34 million in 1979.

Federated Department Stores (now Macy's, Inc.) merged the John Shillito Company and the Rike Kumler Co. (Rike's) under the singular name Shillito-Rike's in 1982. This was done because executives felt that combining the two names would increase the profitability of both chains, due to Rike's having been based in nearby Dayton. Four years later, all of the Shillito-Rike's stores were further consolidated with Columbus, Ohio-based Lazarus. Another anchor change ensued in 1984 when Pogue's parent company, Associated Dry Goods, merged the chain with L. S. Ayres of Indianapolis. A food court opened off the main entrance in 1985, with nine restaurants including Baskin-Robbins, Great Steak, and Pizza Hut. The opening of this food court coincided with 25th anniversary festivities, including a raffle with a grand prize of $7,000, a candle-lighting ceremony, and a sock hop. At the time, the mall consisted of over 983,862 square feet (91,403.8 m^{2}) of shop space and over 94 tenants. A 1985 Cincinnati Enquirer article also noted that the mall's existence helped to draw more business and industry to the Springdale area. Throughout the 1980s, many more shopping centers were built along the intersection of Princeton Pike and Kemper Road, including Princeton Plaza, Cassinelli Square, and Beltway Plaza, the last of which was converted from an abandoned factory that formerly manufactured candy for the Kroger corporation.

=== Late 1980s and 1990s ===
In 1987, shopping mall developers Shopco Advisory Group submitted plans to the city of Springdale to develop another mall called Springdale Town Center directly across Interstate 275, at the southwest corner of Princeton Pike and Crescentville Road. Under these plans, Springdale Town Center would include 1,000,000 square feet (93,000 m^{2}) of mall space, with JCPenney and McAlpin's as proposed anchors. Shopco had also undergone negotiations with Elder-Beerman, Marshall Field's, and Jacobson's as prospective anchors; Shopco also agreed to a stipulation that Springdale Town Center could not have Lazarus, Sears, or L. S. Ayres as an anchor until 1999. City council rejected the plans for this mall due to concerns over heavy traffic and market saturation, but JCPenney was able to enter the Springdale area only one year later when it purchased the L. S. Ayres store at Tri-County, along with two others at Kenwood Towne Centre and Northgate Mall. The May Department Stores Company, which had acquired Associated Dry Goods in 1986, chose to close these three L. S. Ayres stores along with one in downtown Cincinnati and all locations in Kentucky due to unprofitability. JCPenney had previously conducted market research which determined the need for more shopping mall-based stores in the Cincinnati market, and analysts concluded that the acquisition of the former L. S. Ayres stores at the three malls would be strategic to the chain's expansion there. The Tri-County Mall location of JCPenney opened in mid-1988, resulting in the closure of an existing store in Hamilton.

The mall underwent an expansion in 1990 in response to the construction of nearby Forest Fair Mall, which was built in 1989 4 miles (6.4 km) to the west. The renovations doubled the number of shops by adding a second level atop the existing portion of the mall. The second level was connected to the existing mall by three staircases and a glass elevator. Also, a fountain was added to center court, and the food court was relocated to a larger location on the newly built upper level by Sears. The new food court was the first part of this expansion to open, doing so in May 1990. In order to attract business from nearby office workers, Tri-County's food court became the first in the United States to accept food orders by fax. Original food court tenants Pizza Hut, Great Steak, and Spinning Fork relocated to the newer food court, which also included Arby's and several local restaurants. Also as part of the expansion and renovation projects, Lazarus remodeled their store in mid-1991, creating a more open floor plan with wider aisles and less division between departments, as opposed to the previous trend of using different décor in each department. The wider floor plan was achieved by eliminating several stockrooms and nearly all of the furniture department. Following these renovations, the store's manager noted that the store was the most profitable in the chain for August and September 1991. The final part of the expansion, a two-story, 240,000-square-foot (22,000 m^{2}) McAlpin's department store, opened as the mall's fourth anchor store one year later. It was the 100th department store to be opened by parent company Mercantile Stores Company, Inc., and it was designed by the same architectural firm that handled the mall's enclosure in the late 1960s. To add McAlpin's, mall developers had to seek approval from the Lazarus chain, which under the terms of its lease had to approve the addition of any anchor stores to the mall.

=== Late 1990s and onward ===
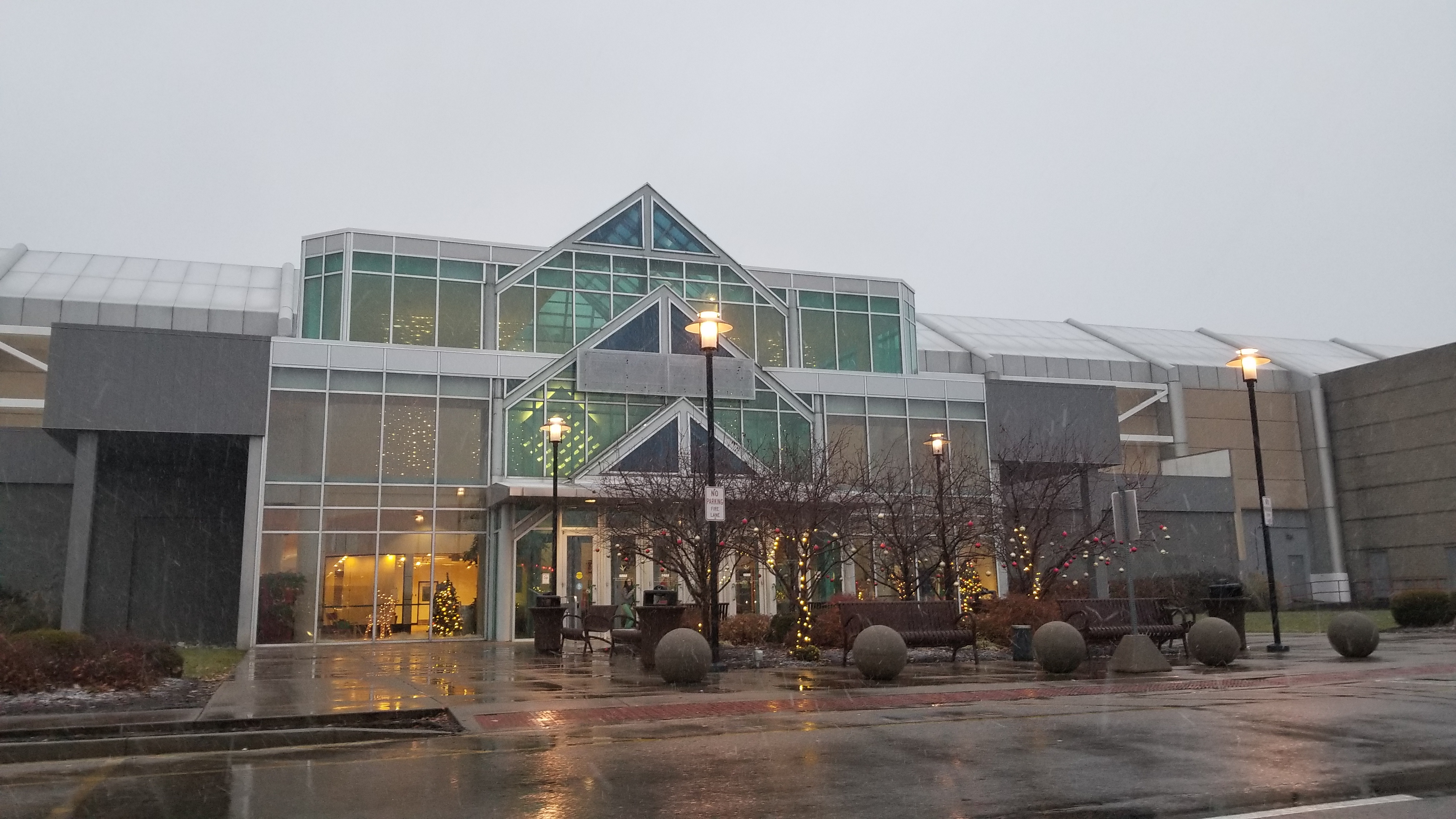
A mall entrance in 2018.

Equitable Life Insurance put Tri-County and several other mall properties up for sale in December 1996, due to concerns over saturation in the American retail market. It was sold to the O'Connor Group in July 1997 for $147 million. At the time of sale, the mall was 90 percent leased. In 1998, Dillard's acquired the Mercantile Stores Company, which resulted in all of the McAlpin's stores being rebranded as Dillard's. Blackstone Group, a real estate company based out of New York City, announced negotiations to buy the mall from O'Connor Group in 2002. Blackstone then sold the mall to Thor Equities in 2005. At the time of the sale, the mall faced increased competition once again from Forest Fair Mall, which underwent massive renovations and became Cincinnati Mills (later Forest Fair Village). Tri-County had not undergone exterior renovations since the early 1990s, when the expansion was completed. These two factors had a negative impact on the mall's value and tenancy.

Two further anchor changes occurred under Thor Equities' ownership. Lazarus, which had been dual-branded by Federated Department Stores as Lazarus-Macy's in 2003, became just Macy's in 2005. Also, JCPenney closed its Tri-County location in 2005, and returned to the city of Hamilton with a store at the then-newly built Bridgewater Falls shopping center. One year later, the former JCPenney building underwent a major renovation, in which a new mall hallway was run through the lower level of the building, leading to a new mall entrance. The hallway was to include several new mall shops, including an Ethan Allen furniture store and a location of BJ's Restaurants. Also part of this renovation plan was new signage along Interstate 275. A joint venture of Coventry Real Estate and Developers Diversified Realty (now SITE Centers) bought the mall in May 2006.

=== 2010s-2020s: Decline and possible redevelopment ===
After losing JCPenney, the Tri-County Mall and surrounding retail developments continued to suffer a decline in tenancy. One factor was the Great Recession, which impacted a large number of retailers that had locations in or near the mall. Among these were Borders Books & Music, Value City, CompUSA, and Circuit City, all of which went out of business entirely. Also, population growth had shifted northerly from the mall since the 1990s, resulting in newer retail developments which drew away tenants and shoppers from the older developments. These factors also impacted Northgate and Forest Fair malls, creating a surplus of retail space in the area. Another factor cited by analysts in the mall's decline was a curfew enacted in 2010, requiring patrons under the age of 18 to be escorted out of the mall by 4 pm on Fridays and Saturdays.

In July 2013, the mall was purchased by SingHaiyi Group, a real estate company based in Singapore. Dillard's downgraded its store to an outlet store in 2013, and then closed it in 2015 in favor of a new store at Liberty Center in Liberty Township. To counter the decline in tenancy, SingHaiyi announced a renovation project in 2015, which included the addition of Chipotle Mexican Grill, Outback Steakhouse, and Men's Wearhouse on outparcels, while Shoe Dept. Encore and new food court restaurants were added. Other proposals to help maintain tenancy at the mall included a plan to convert portions to offices or other non-retail uses, while replacing the former Dillard's with a dine-in theater.

On June 4, 2018, Sears announced that its Tri-County store would close in September 2018. Despite the closure of other anchors, Macy's opened a division of its discount format Backstage at its Tri-County location in 2018. A 2017 article noted that, despite promises of renovation from the mall's developers, Tri-County had a large number of inline vacancies at the time, primarily on the main level and near the food court. The same article noted that retail analysts considered the mall "vulnerable" due to its numerous vacancies and an ongoing trend in the 21st century in the decline of shopping malls. Among the major chains to vacate the mall in the 2010s are The Limited, which closed in 2016, plus Victoria's Secret, Charlotte Russe, and Things Remembered, all in 2019.

On January 5, 2021, it was announced that Macy's would be closing on March 21, 2021, as part of a plan to close 46 stores nationwide which left the mall with no remaining anchor stores. The city of Springdale approved a redevelopment plan in December 2021, which will call for the demolition and reconfiguration of the mall into a series of ten-story buildings featuring retail, offices, and residences. The plan is estimated to cost $1,000,000,000 and require re-zoning of the land. The mall was sold in March 2022 to MarketSpace Capital and Park Harbor Capital, a pair of developers from Texas. As part of their re-development plans, the mall owners announced that the building would close permanently on May 15, 2022.
