= Springdale, Ohio =

- City
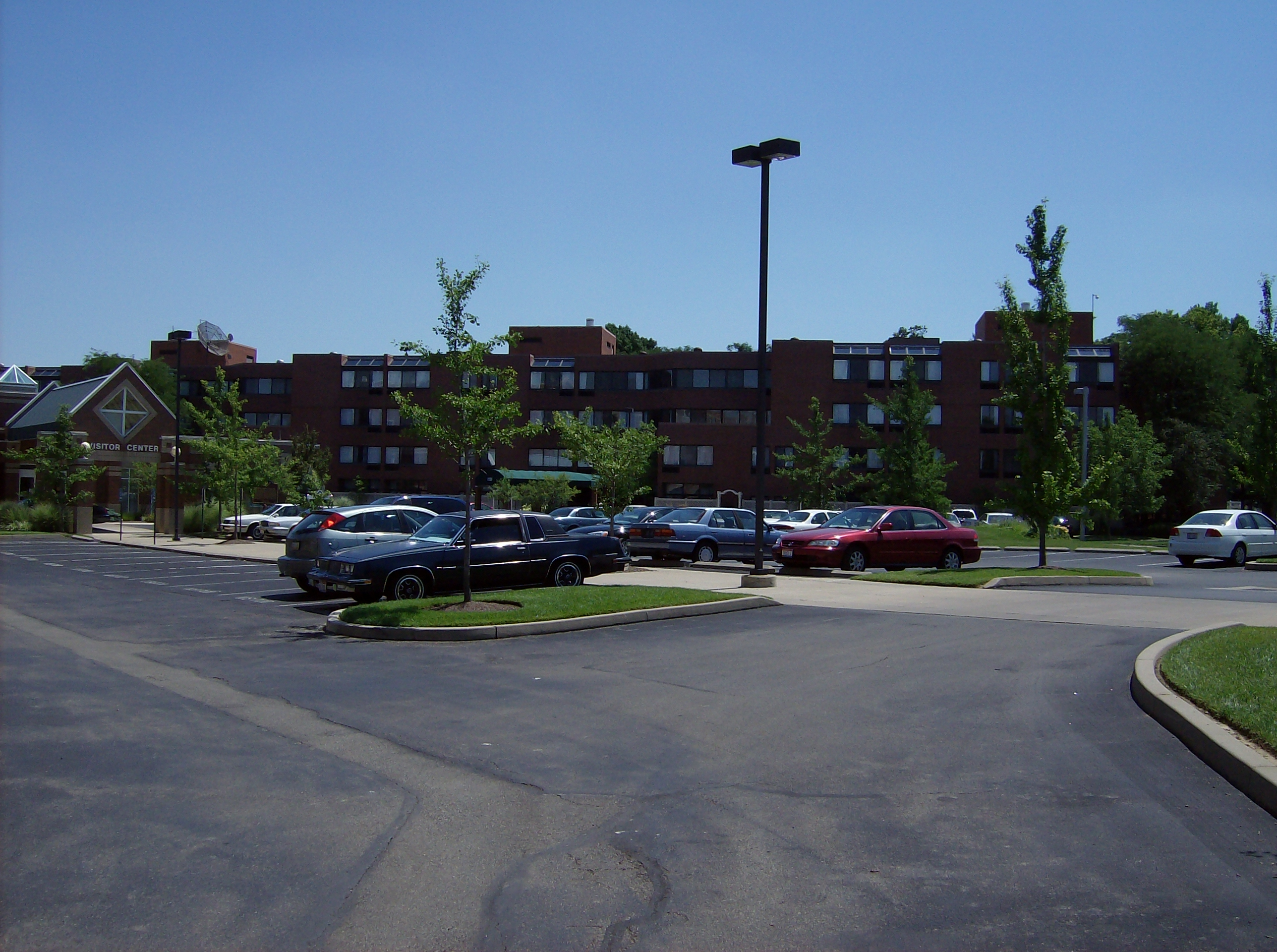
- Part of the Maple Knoll Village retirement complex
- Motto: "Come Explore The Opportunities"
- Interactive map of Springdale, Ohio
- Location within Ohio Location within the United States
- Coordinates: 39°17′35″N 84°28′59″W
- Country: United States
- State: Ohio
- County: Hamilton

Government
  - Type: Mayor–council government
  - Mayor: Lawrence C. Hawkins III
  - Council President: Jeffrey Anderson

Area
  - Total: 4.99 sq mi (12.92 km^{2})
  - Land: 4.98 sq mi (12.89 km^{2})
  - Water: 0.012 sq mi (0.03 km^{2})
- Elevation: 682 ft (208 m)

Population (2020)
  - Total: 11,007
  - Estimate (2022): 10,869
  - Density: 2,211.3/sq mi (853.77/km^{2})
- Time zone: UTC-5 (Eastern (EST))
  - Summer (DST): UTC-4 (EDT)
- ZIP code: 45246
- Area code: 513
- FIPS code: 39-74104
- GNIS feature ID: 1086229
- Website: springdaleohio.gov

Springdale is a city in Hamilton County, Ohio, United States. It is a suburb of Cincinnati. The population was 11,007 at the 2020 census.

== Geography ==
According to the United States Census Bureau, the city has a total area of 4.97 square miles (12.87 km^{2}), of which 4.96 square miles (12.85 km^{2}) is land and 0.01 square miles (0.03 km^{2}) is water.

== Demographics ==
Historical population
Census	Pop.	Note	%±
1870	382		—
1960	3,556		—
1970	8,127		128.5%
1980	7,474		−8.0%
1990	10,621		42.1%
2000	10,563		−0.5%
2010	11,223		6.2%
2020	11,007		−1.9%
2025 (est.)	11,134		1.2%

=== 2020 census ===
As of the 2020 census, Springdale had a population of 11,007 and a population density of 2,211.13 inhabitants per square mile (853.72/km^{2}). The median age was 39.4 years, 22.9% of residents were under the age of 18, 22.2% were 65 years of age or older, for every 100 females there were 89.7 males, and for every 100 females age 18 and over there were 85.3 males age 18 and over.

100.0% of residents lived in urban areas, while 0.0% lived in rural areas.

There were 4,501 households in Springdale, of which 28.7% had children under the age of 18 living in them. Of all households, 38.8% were married-couple households, 18.3% were households with a male householder and no spouse or partner present, and 36.8% were households with a female householder and no spouse or partner present. About 34.5% of all households were made up of individuals and 20.4% had someone living alone who was 65 years of age or older.

There were 4,817 housing units, of which 6.6% were vacant. The homeowner vacancy rate was 1.8% and the rental vacancy rate was 8.1%.

Racial composition as of the 2020 census
Race	Number	Percent
White	4,580	41.6%
Black or African American	3,379	30.7%
American Indian and Alaska Native	200	1.8%
Asian	392	3.6%
Native Hawaiian and Other Pacific Islander	17	0.2%
Some other race	1,351	12.3%
Two or more races	1,088	9.9%
Hispanic or Latino (of any race)	2,302	20.9%

According to the U.S. Census American Community Survey, for the period 2016-2020 the estimated median annual income for a household in the city was $64,606, and the median income for a family was $69,271. About 11.4% of the population were living below the poverty line, including 27.4% of those under age 18 and 4.8% of those age 65 or over. About 54.7% of the population were employed, and 32.7% had a bachelor's degree or higher.

=== 2010 census ===
As of the census of 2010, there were 11,223 people, 4,631 households, and 2,771 families living in the city. The population density was 2,262.7 inhabitants per square mile (873.6/km^{2}). There were 4,906 housing units at an average density of 989.1 per square mile (381.9/km^{2}). The racial makeup of the city was 55.0% White, 29.9% African American, 0.3% Native American, 2.8% Asian, 0.4% Pacific Islander, 8.7% from other races, and 2.9% from two or more races. Hispanic or Latino of any race were 17.5% of the population.

There were 4,631 households, of which 29.1% had children under the age of 18 living with them, 40.2% were married couples living together, 14.8% had a female householder with no husband present, 4.9% had a male householder with no wife present, and 40.2% were non-families. 34.9% of all households were made up of individuals, and 19.5% had someone living alone who was 65 years of age or older. The average household size was 2.38 and the average family size was 3.07.

The median age in the city was 38.7 years. 22.6% of residents were under the age of 18; 9.4% were between the ages of 18 and 24; 25.1% were from 25 to 44; 22.9% were from 45 to 64; and 20% were 65 years of age or older. The gender makeup of the city was 46.5% male and 53.5% female.

=== 2000 census ===
As of the census of 2000, there were 10,563 people, 4,421 households, and 2,816 families living in the city. The population density was 2,131.0 inhabitants per square mile (822.8/km^{2}). There were 4,607 housing units at an average density of 929.4 per square mile (358.8/km^{2}). The racial makeup of the city was 68.38% White, 25.63% African American, 0.11% Native American, 2.53% Asian, 0.02% Pacific Islander, 1.50% from other races, and 1.84% from two or more races. Hispanic or Latino of any race were 3.64% of the population.

There were 4,421 households, out of which 29.0% had children under the age of 18 living with them, 46.7% were married couples living together, 13.7% had a female householder with no husband present, and 36.3% were non-families. 32.0% of all households were made up of individuals, and 16.3% had someone living alone who was 65 years of age or older. The average household size was 2.33 and the average family size was 2.95.

In the city, the population was spread out, with 24.0% under the age of 18, 7.3% from 18 to 24, 27.0% from 25 to 44, 23.0% from 45 to 64, and 18.7% who were 65 years of age or older. The median age was 39 years. For every 100 females, there were 82.9 males. For every 100 females age 18 and over, there were 76.6 males.

The median income for a household in the city was $44,732, and the median income for a family was $53,979. Males had a median income of $43,259 versus $29,763 for females. The per capita income for the city was $23,688. About 7.7% of families and 8.9% of the population were below the poverty line, including 13.2% of those under age 18 and 5.6% of those age 65 or over.

== Economy ==
Kroger operates its Cincinnati-area regional offices at 150 Tri-County Parkway in Springdale; Kroger is headquartered in nearby Cincinnati.

== Transportation ==
The Butler County Regional Transit Authority and Southwest Ohio Regional Transit Authority both provide bus service to Springdale, allowing travel to Cincinnati, Hamilton and numerous other cities in the region.

== Institutions ==
- Cincom Systems
- Humana RightSourceRx
- Maple Knoll Village and WMKV
- Tri-County Mall
