= Chapel Hill Mall =

Defunct mall in Akron, Ohio, U.S.

Chapel Hill Business Park
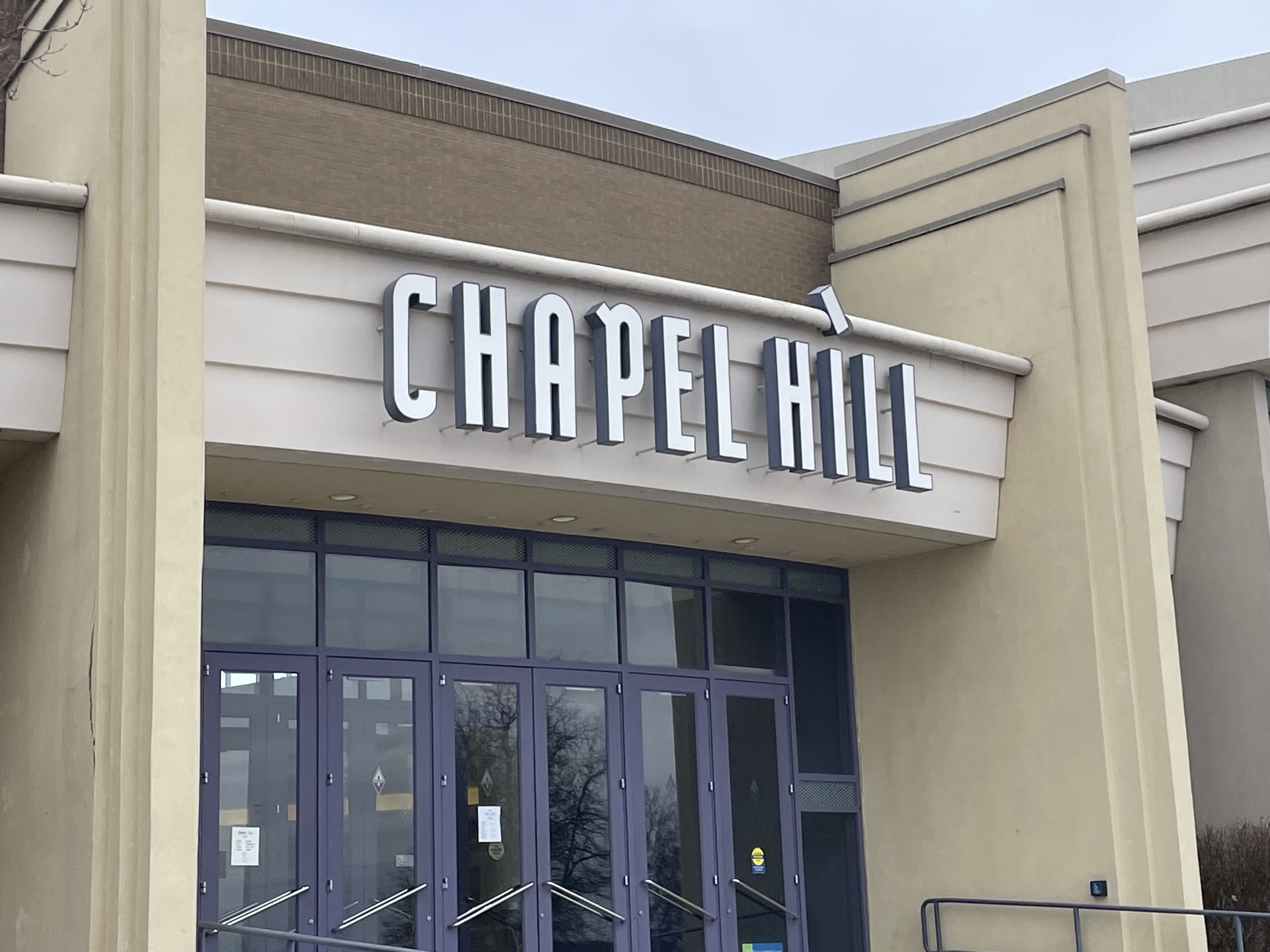
- Food court entrance (January 2021)
- Former names: Chapel Hill Mall (1967–2021)
- Alternative names: 2000 Brittain Road

General information
- Status: Operational as a light industrial property
- Type: Shopping mall (1967–2021); Corporate campus (2023–present)
- Location: Akron, Ohio, U.S., 2000 Brittain Road, 44310
- Coordinates: 41.113997°N 81.468655°W
- Opened: As Chapel Hill Mall: October 12, 1967; 59 years ago; As Chapel Hill Business Park: around April 2022; 4 years ago
- Renovated: 1994; November 2006; April 2021 – April 2022
- Closed: April 18, 2021; 5 years ago (as Chapel Hill Mall)
- Demolished: April 2021 – April 2022 (interior only)
- Owner: Industrial Commercial Properties LLC; Storage of America
- Operator: McKinley Management Company

Technical details
- Floor count: 1 (2 in former JCPenney and Macy's)
- Floor area: 829,000 square feet (77,000 m^{2})

Design and construction
- Architect: Lathrop Douglass
- Developer: Forest City Enterprises; Richard B. Buchholzer

Other information
- Number of stores: 100 (at peak)
- Number of anchors: 3 (at peak)
- Public transit: METRO

Website
- www.icpllc.com/icp_portfolio/2000-brittain-road-akron-ohio/; chapelhillmall.com (outdated)

Chapel Hill Mall was a regional mall located in the Chapel Hill neighborhood of Akron, Ohio, United States. It was built by Richard "R.B." Buchholzer (February 19, 1916 – February 6, 2006) and Forest City Enterprises, and opened in October 1967. At its peak, the mall featured more than 100 stores, with Sears, JCPenney, and O'Neil's as its original anchors.

In March 2021, after several years of financial issues and ownership changes, the mall was purchased by Industrial Commercial Properties with the intent of turning it into a business park. The mall officially closed its doors in the following month.

== History ==
=== Background ===
Chapel Hill Mall sits on land once owned by Richard Buchholzer's father, Julius Johannes "J.J." Buchholzer. In the 1930s, a then-teenage Richard found what appeared to be an old Native American council circle on his father's land. Because of this, Richard would later name the development "Chapel Hill," referring to the idea that the council circle was the Native "equivalent of a chapel."

In 1932, during the Great Depression, J.J. Buchholzer became the owner of a Hower's department store in downtown Akron.

=== 1960–1967: Planning and construction ===
The Buchholzers anticipated that the city of Akron would expand to the north, and they felt that another Hower's store should be built on their land. They later decided to build a climate-controlled shopping mall instead, predicting that it would provide them greater economic opportunities. J.J. Buchholzer died in 1960, and Richard assumed his duties as executive officer of the Hower's. Buchholzer soon teamed up with Forest City Enterprises to build what would be Akron's first indoor mall.

Plans were ready by 1963, with the proposal spanning a 175-acre (71 ha) site off Brittain Road featuring mixed-use planning, including adjacent multi-family housing that would later become the Chapel Hill Towers, and the New York City architect Lathrop Douglass was hired to design a fully enclosed, weather-protected shopping center. Before the mall opened, the Edward J. DeBartolo Corporation opened Summit Mall on the west side of Akron in October 1965.

Physical construction officially commenced in late 1965 on an overall project budget of $75 million. A standalone Sears department store debuted on September 29, 1966, followed by the opening of General Cinema Corporation's Cinema I & II on October 9, 1966, notable for being Ohio's very first built-in twin cinema theater. A massive 165,100-square-foot (15,340 m^{2}) O'Neil's department store opened on February 16, 1967, housing the posh Hilltop Room restaurant, followed by a 194,100-square-foot (18,030 m^{2}) JCPenney on August 17 of that year.

=== 1967–1990: Grand opening, Rolling Acres Mall, and early operations ===
Chapel Hill Mall itself officially had its grand opening on the weekend October 12 through 14, 1967, with over 50 tenants and 5,400 parking spaces, consolidating with Columbus Day and featuring Woolworth. The marketing campaign Discover the New World of Chapel Hill was launched, with an attraction featuring authentic sunken treasure recovered from Spanish ships that had sunk centuries prior in the Caribbean, 1961 Mr. America (Tom Sansone), who made appearances to sign autographs and promote fitness.

Local music performances and puppet shows held throughout the central walkways to keep families and shoppers entertained while navigating the concourse, and a 218-foot-long, 13-foot-high mural by local artist Brian J. Plesmid known as The Four Seasons was constructed of fresh cement troweled over metal mesh and embedded with pieces of colorful glass. Twin musical fountains in the North and South court were designed by Jack Erbe, programmed to "splash and prance" in sync with piped-in music played over the mall's audio system. Gray Drug Stores opened on November 17.

Just ten miles away, located at 2400 Romig Road, Buchholzer and Forest City opened the larger Rolling Acres Mall on August 6, 1975 with two floors, and the same anchors as the older Chapel Hill Mall, being JCPenney, Sears, O'Neil's, and General Cinema, instead of choosing separate anchors. This created cannibalization problems as many specialty clothing, shoe, and jewelry boutiques that were already operating successfully inside Chapel Hill were pressured to open second local branches inside Rolling Acres, and unlike Chapel Hill, which had a two-screen cinema, Rolling Acres had a three-screen cinema.

=== Late 1980s – 2006 ===
Expansion plans to include a Higbee's store came up numerous times in the late 1980s and early 1990s. A plan was considered in 1988 by Forest City Enterprises, including a 90,000-square-foot (8,400 m^{2}) addition for an additional department store. Expansion was again mentioned in April 1989. That year, May Company Ohio acquired and rebranded all of the O'Neil's stores, which rebranded again to Kaufmann's from 1992 to 1993 after May Department Stores combined the subsidiaries, alongside the Higbee's anchor being rebranded as a Dillard's after they purchased the chain.

A front-page story on the January 31, 1990 edition of the Akron Beacon Journal read "Higbee's Coming to Chapel Hill Mall", and said that the store, along with a food court and additional retail space, would be open by the fall of 1991. However, they weren't added until 1994, when Buchholzer and Forest City opened the food court with a full-size, fully operational merry-go-round in the center, and retail expansion, as well as updated flooring and ceiling tiles, the addition of a new center fountain, and updated lighting.

In 1987, General Cinemas opened an 8-screen multiplex just west of the mall, and on October 18, 1996, Regal Cinemas opened their 10-screen theater immediately south of the mall, known as Regal Independence 10. Less than two weeks later, the General Cinemas at the mall, which was expanded from two screens to five screens, closed its doors on November 19, as the competing Regal had modern amenities such as stadium seating, wall-to-wall screens, and "Experience" concessions, which the smaller Chapel Hill cinema lacked. Woolworth closed in July 1997, and was later replaced by Gap.

Buchholzer and Forest City sold Chapel Hill Mall, which, at the time, had 97% occupancy in comparison to the failing Rolling Acres, to the Chattanooga, Tennessee-based CBL & Associates Properties, Inc. for $77 million in September 2004. In September 2006, Kaufmann's was converted into Macy's after May Department Stores was acquired by Federated Department Stores. CBL initiated a massive renovation project that culminated in a grand reopening ceremony in November 2006, with modern recessed ceilings and the arrival of Charlotte Russe and Man Alive.

=== 2015–2021: Decline and closure ===
On July 7, 2015, Sears Holdings spun off 235 of its properties, including the Sears at Chapel Hill Mall, into Seritage Growth Properties. The mall gradually began to decline, and on March 25, 2016, Macy's permanently closed their Chapel Hill Mall location, citing "disappointing" holiday sales.

On July 15, 2016, the New York-based Kohan Retail Investment Group, owned by Michael Kohan, bought Chapel Hill Mall for $8.6 million with plans to revitalize the location and focus on attracting younger customers. On January 4, 2017, Sears Holdings announced that the Chapel Hill Sears store would be closing the following spring due to declining sales. By August 2018, "about a quarter" of the storefronts were vacant.

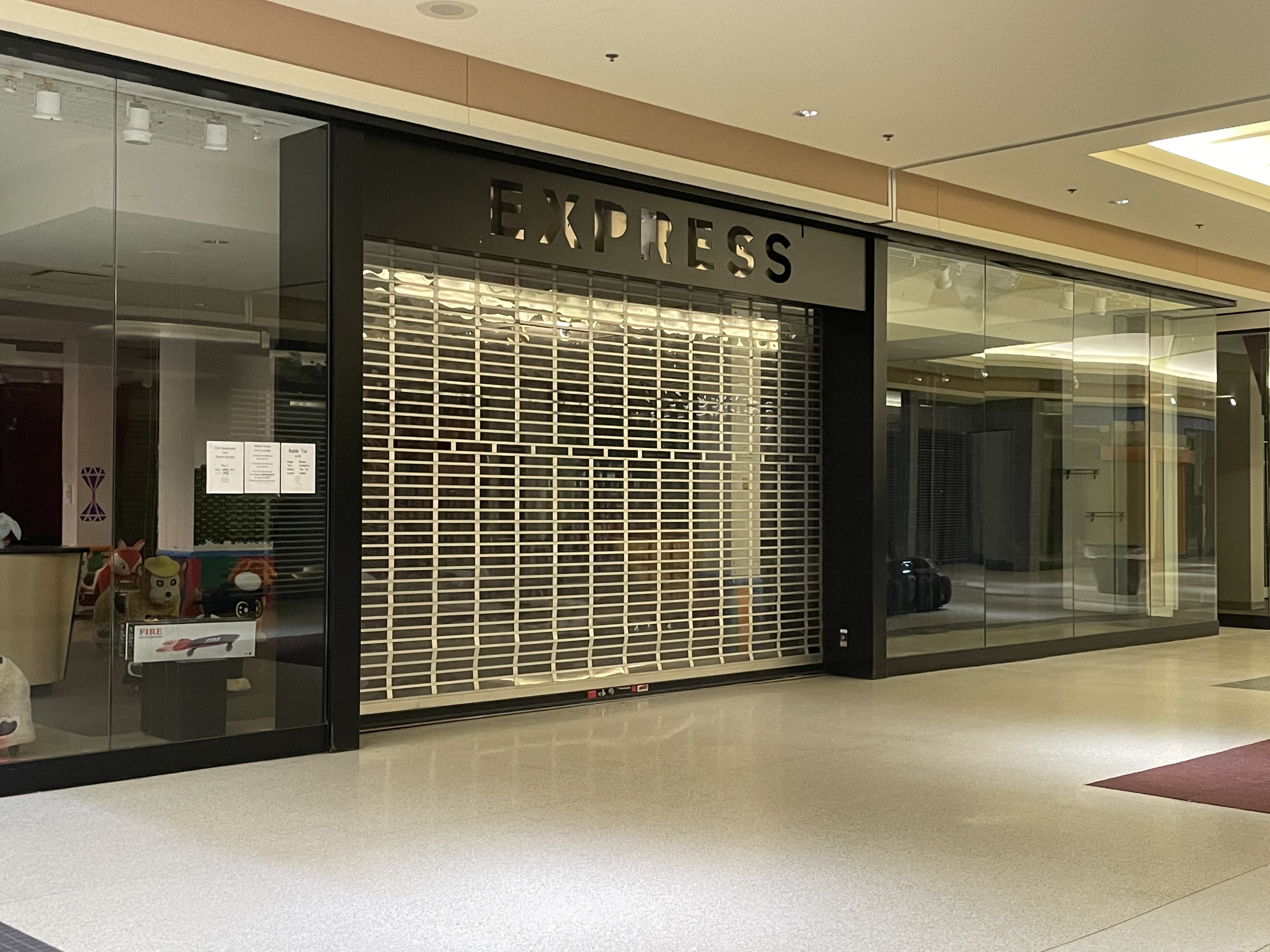
Former Express, which closed in 2014, as viewed from the former Macy's concourse in January 2021

Mall tenants received multiple notices from the City of Akron of potential utility shutoff on December 3, 2019 and January 3, 2020 due to accumulating unpaid water and electricity bills. The city decided to cancel the shutoffs due to partial payments received from Kohan, but the overall debt continued to accumulate, and in September 2019, the Summit County fiscal office began to discuss the possibility of foreclosing on the property after they received a notice from the city about the delinquent account.

On January 3, 2020, Ohio Edison of FirstEnergy filled a complaint against Kohan, citing over $195,000 of overdue bills. Ten days later, Kohan was served with a foreclosure notice for over $750,000 of unpaid bills owed to Summit County. Retail taxes, which had not been paid since January 2019, made up over half of the amount owed, including interest and fees.

On January 16, 2020, it was announced that JCPenney would close on April 24 of that year as part of a plan to close six stores nationwide, leaving Chapel Hill Mall with no remaining anchors. Due to the COVID-19 pandemic, which caused the mall to close temporarily on March 20 of that year, the store remained open for five additional weeks when the mall would resume operations on May, but on June 17 it was included in an updated list of 136 stores closing. On May 20, 2020, spokeswoman Kristen Bennett announced that the updated closure date would be July 17.

=== 2021–present: Redevelopment ===
On March 16, 2021, Industrial Commercial Properties LLC (ICP) purchased the mall property for $7 million, $844,085.24 of which went to the county to pay off previous debts. At this time, only 20 out of 75 available storefronts were in use, including kiosks.

ICP planned to redevelop the 829,000-square-foot (77,000 m^{2}) Chapel Hill Mall into a light-industrial and commercial business campus known as Chapel Hill Business Park, investing in $20 million backed by a $1.5 million incentive package approved by the Akron City Council. The Chapel Hill Mall closed permanently on April 18, 2021, with the remaining tenants being evicted to allow for construction. After the mall closed, the carousel in the food court was relocated to Lock 3 Park. Much of the building underwent renovations by April 12, 2022; the exterior received new paint jobs and landscaping, and interior walls were removed or repurposed to create a more open floor plan for the new tenants.

As of September 2023, the main building is occupied by four tenants: Craft33, Driverge, OnQ and Quantix. A few smaller suites remain vacant, and areas in what used to be the mall's parking lot are now leased to tenants such as Firestone Tire and Rubber Company. Various tenants had moved in by April 18, 2024, and by then, Storage of America had involvement in ownership.

== Adjacent facilities ==
=== Chapel Hill Crossing ===
Chapel Hill Crossing opened two years after the main mall, and was designed feature traditional big-box stores, including Sam's Club, Burlington, Home Depot, and Get Air Trampoline Park, featuring 116,574 square feet (10,830.1 m^{2}) at 1886 and 1890 Buchholzer Blvd. The property is owned by Spigel Properties.

=== The Plaza at Chapel Hill ===
The Plaza at Chapel Hill, a power center located along Howe Avenue in Cuyahoga Falls, Ohio, opened in 1986, and was separately developed by Visconsi Companies, Ltd, which owned it until 2014, when they sold it to Devonshire REIT. Institutional Property Advisors (IPA) sold the 459,000-square-foot (42,600 m^{2}) property in June 2020 for $46 million to a private equity partnership consisting of America's Realty LLC, Borough Equities, and Dragonfly Investments. Goodman Real Estate handles daily operations.

On September 25, 1988, the Plaza at Chapel Hill 8 cinema opened at the property as General Cinemas, later rebranding as AMC Theatres and Cleveland Cinemas. After celebrating its 25th anniversary, Plaza Cinemas would close permanently on January 8, 2013 due to lease expiration. The theater was shortly demolished in the spring of that year to replace it with Dick's Sporting Goods.

== Archie the Talking Snowman ==
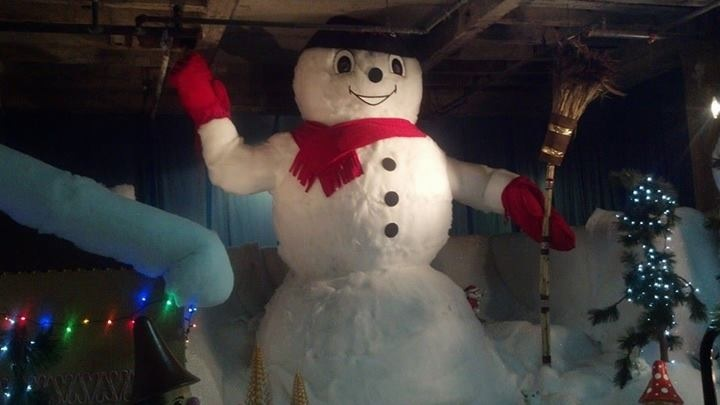
Archie Arctic, powered down

Archie Arctic the talking snowman was a 20-foot (6.1 m) tall machine designed to look like the iconic archetype of the snowman; he had a smiling face with glowing eyes, wore a top hat, scarf, buttons, and gloves, and held a large broom in one hand while raising the other hand in greetings. Archie played the role of the interactive winter holiday feature which was common at other indoor shopping malls at the time. A child would speak into a microphone in front of Archie, and he appeared to reply and make casual conversation, and he would ask the child about their preferred Christmas gifts. In reality, he was controlled by an actor, Archie creator Ra'ul Umana, located in another room, who could see the speaker while also concealing his actual location. The actor would speak into a microphone, and the sound would be emitted from speakers hidden inside the snowman's body to create the illusion that the speech originated from Archie. Archie was at the mall from 1968 to 2004; a version of him was later placed in Lock 3 Park in downtown Akron. Archie's voice has been provided by actor Brandon Meeker since 2021.

== Gallery ==
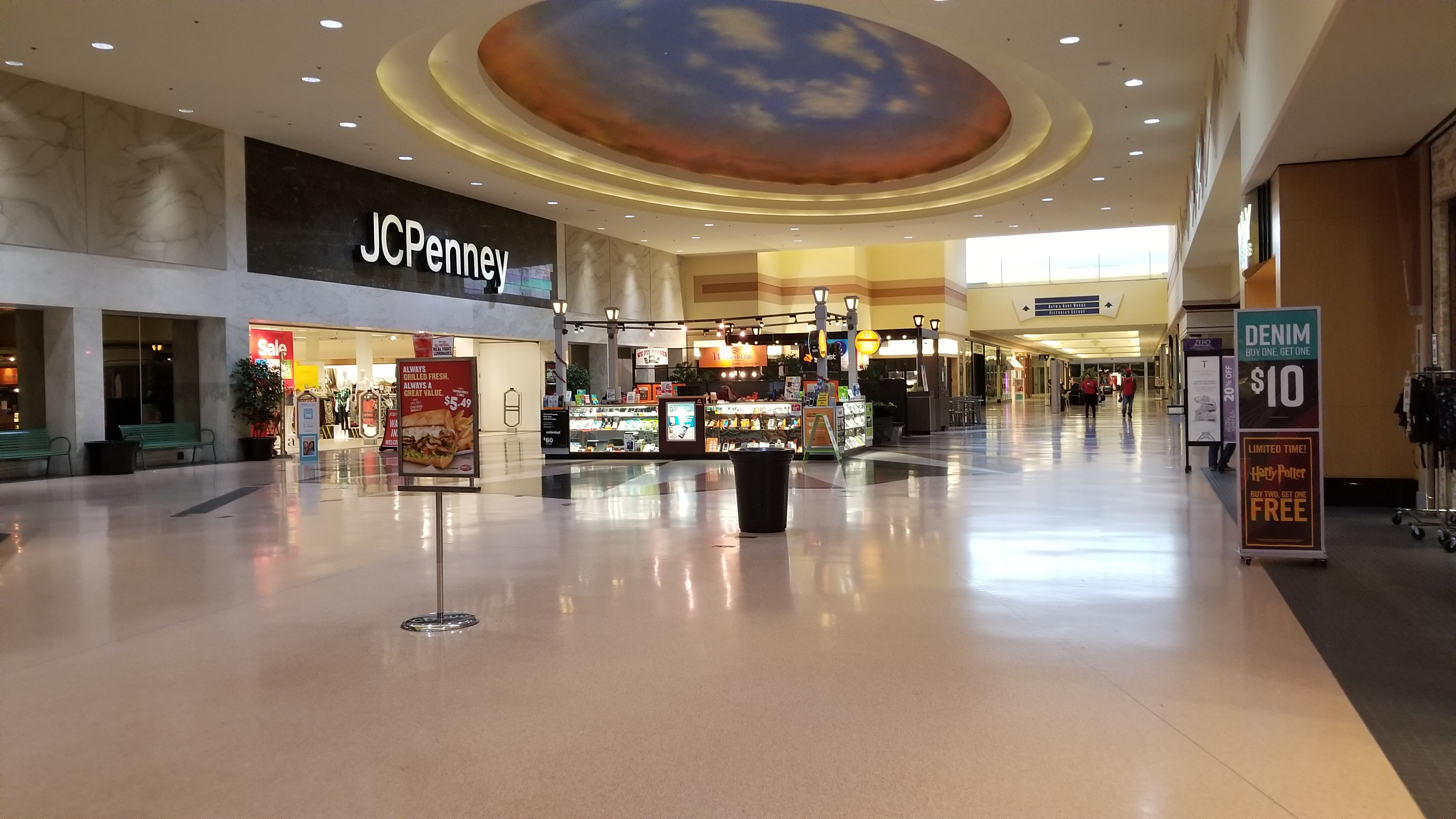
JCPenney court (August 2018)

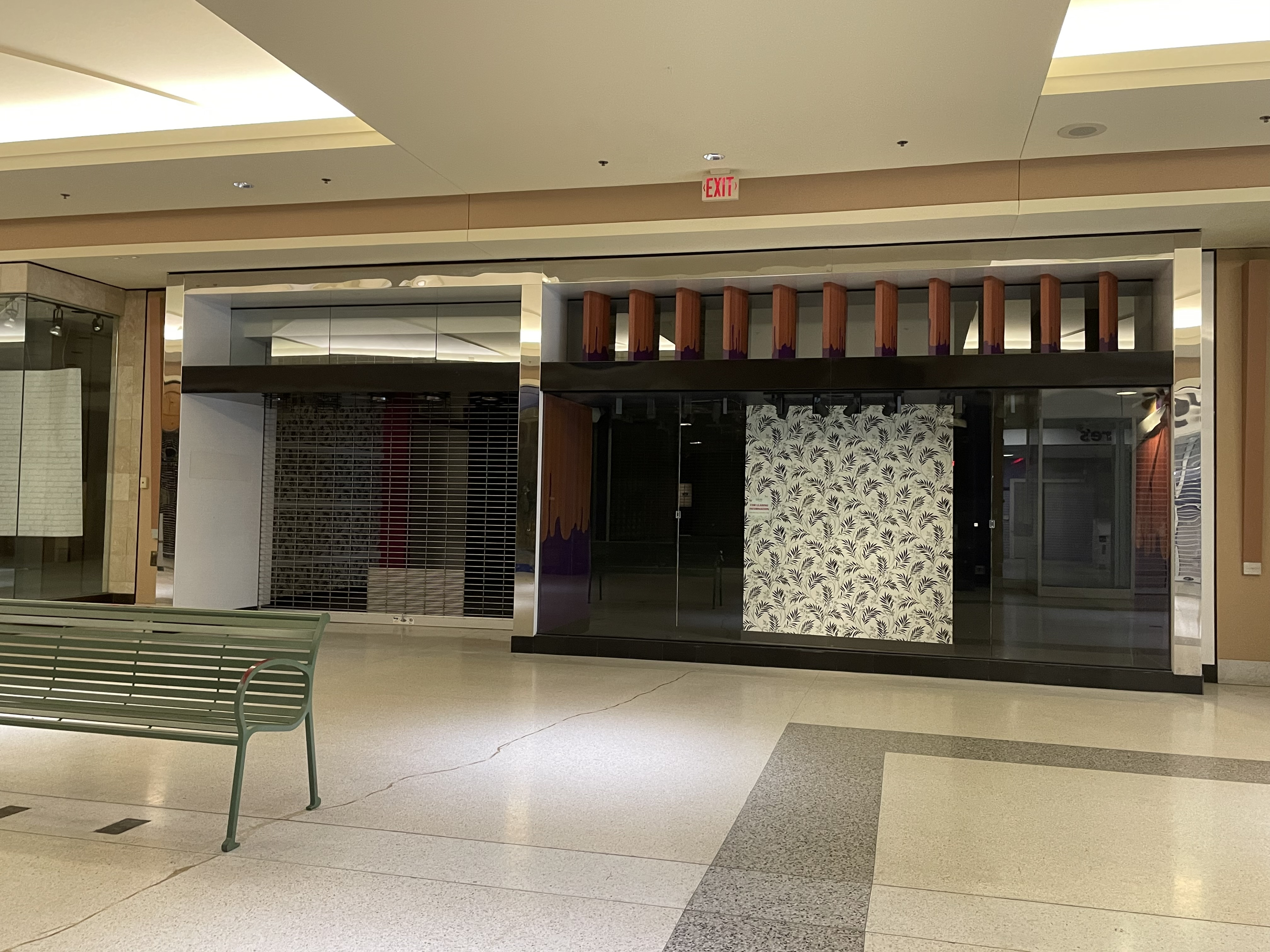
Former Wet Seal, which closed in January 2017 as the company filed for Chapter 11 bankruptcy and liquidated

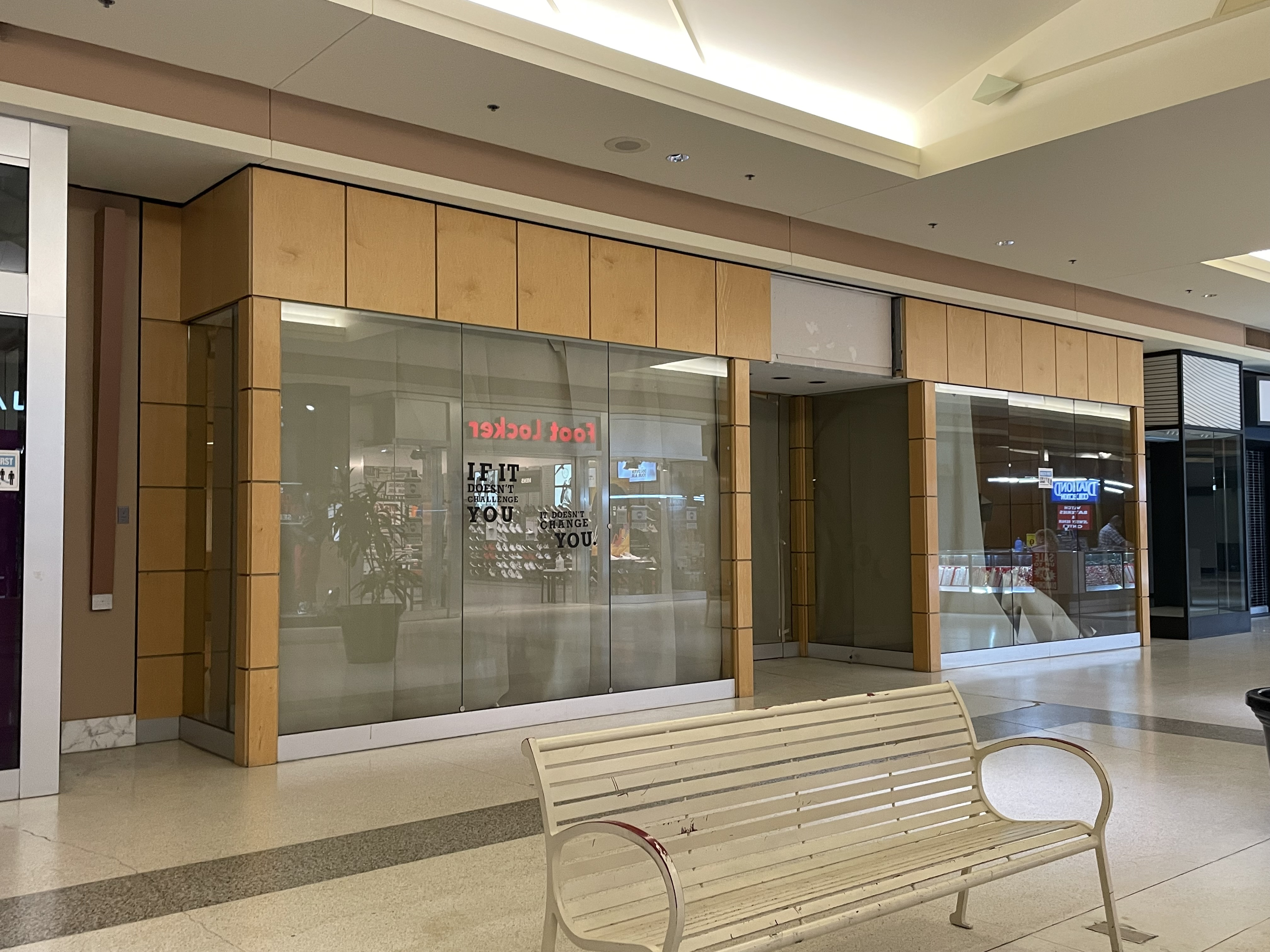
Former Children's Place in former Sears court (January 2021)

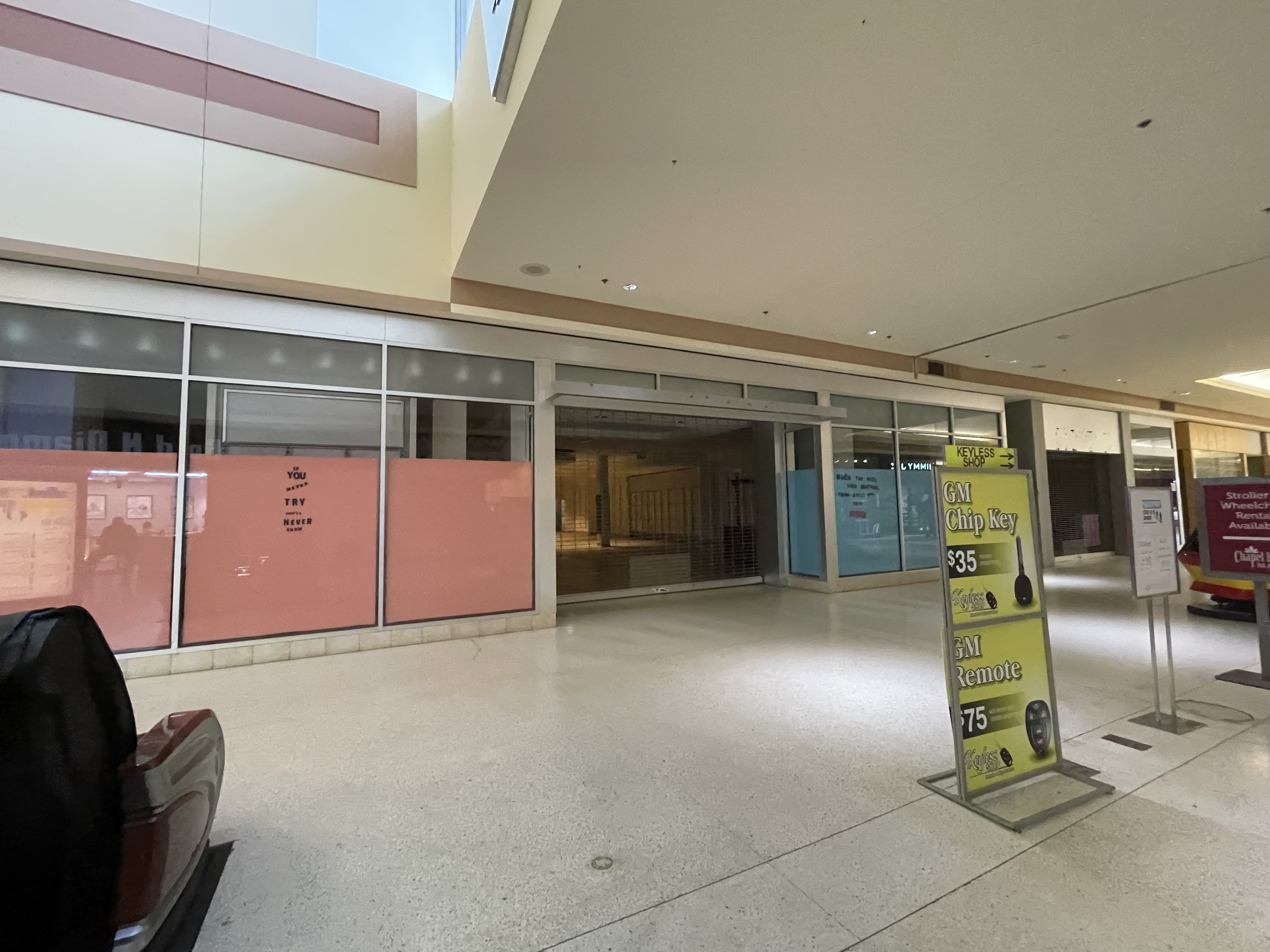
Former Charlotte Russe, which closed due to financial issues (January 2021)

== See also ==
- St. Louis Mills, which was also redeveloped by ICP into Hazelwood Business Park
- Rolling Acres, Akron, Ohio, a former shopping district that surrounded Rolling Acres Mall
