= Rolling Acres Mall =

Defunct mall in Akron, Ohio, U.S.

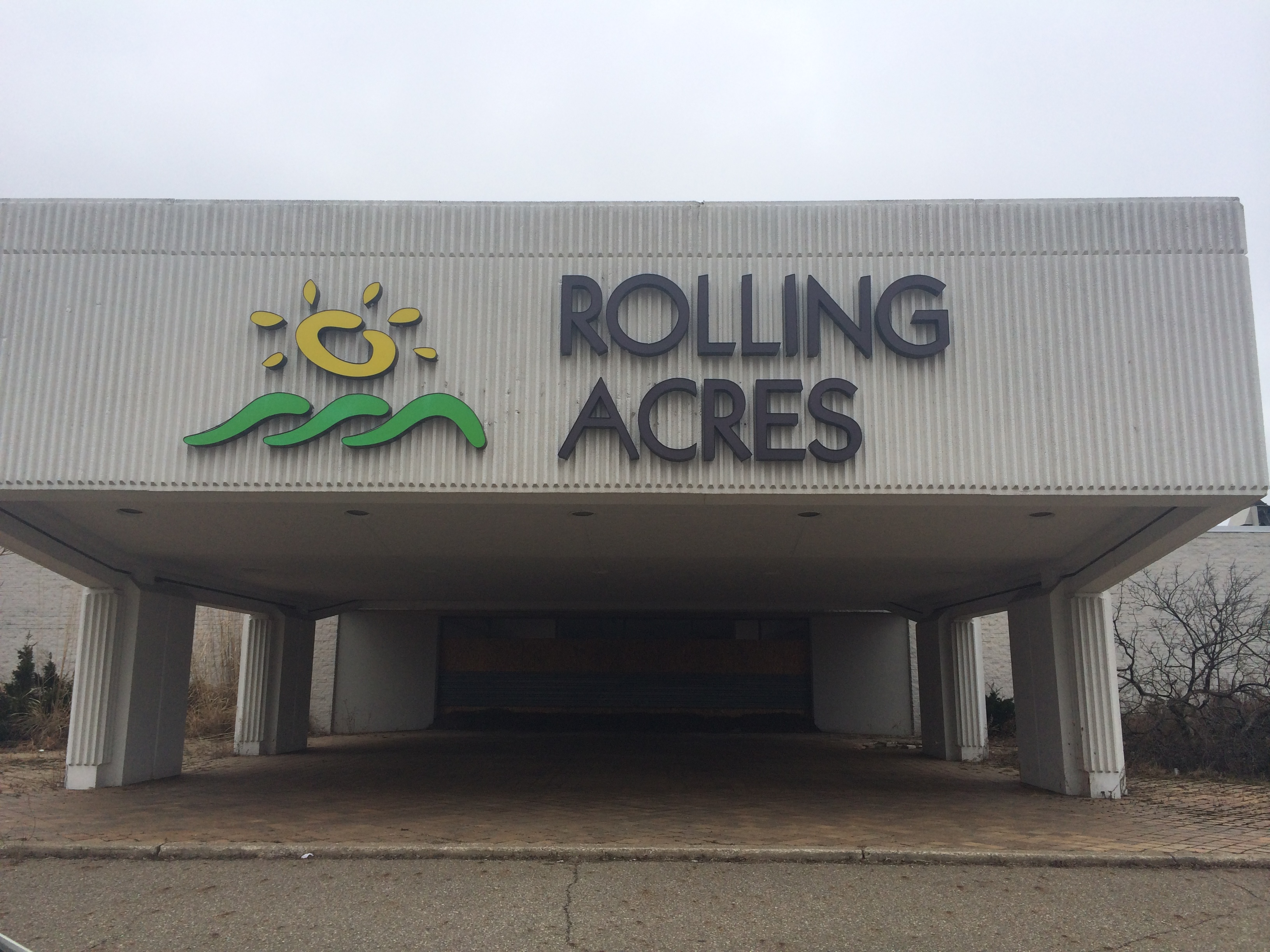
- Boarded front entrance in March 2014
- Location: Akron, Ohio, U.S.
- Coordinates: 41.0488°N 81.5839°W
- Address: 2400 Romig Road, 44322
- Opened: August 6, 1975; 51 years ago
- Closed: October 31, 2008; 18 years ago
- Demolished: July 2016 – October 2017 (mall building and JCPenney); August–November 2019 (remaining anchor buildings, which were acquired and razed by Amazon)
- Developer: Forest City Enterprises; Richard B. Buchholzer
- Owner: Amazon
- Architect: Keeva Kekst Association
- Num. of stores: 150+ (at peak)
- Num. of anchor tenants: 5 (at peak)
- Floor area: 1,300,000 square feet (120,000 m^{2})
- Floors: 2 (1 in former Sears, Dillard's and Target)
- Parking: Parking lot
- Public transit: METRO RTA: 3, 9 at Romig Road Transit Center
- Website: rollingacresmall.net at the Wayback Machine (April 2006 archive)

Rolling Acres Mall was a super-regional shopping mall located in the Rolling Acres area of Akron, Ohio, United States. Built in 1975, it originally included approximately 21 stores, with Sears as the main anchor store. Later expansions added several more stores including anchor stores JCPenney (later JC's 5 Star Outlet), Montgomery Ward, and O'Neil's, along with a movie theater and food court known as Picnic Place (formerly Prom-n-Eat).

Montgomery Ward was converted to Higbee's in 1986, and then to Dillard's in 1992, while O'Neil's became May Company Ohio, Kaufmann's, and then finally Macy's. The fifth anchor store was Target, added in 1995. At its peak, the mall had over 150 stores. It underwent a sharp decline in tenancy throughout the 1990s and into the first decade of the 21st century, resulting in the relocation of Target and closure of Dillard's. Macy's and the mall itself both shuttered in 2008, although Sears remained operational until April 2011, and JCPenney as an outlet store until December 2013. Rolling Acres Mall was publicized after its closure as an example of a dead mall, and non-retail ventures operated out of the former locations of Target, Sears, and Dillard's. The mall fell into severe disrepair and was heavily damaged by scrappers and vandalism after its closure, leading to dead mall enthusiasts to describe the building as abandoned. Rolling Acres Mall was finally demolished in stages between 2016 and 2019, with Amazon building a distribution facility on the former site soon after, known as Amazon Fulfillment Center AKC1.

== History ==
=== 1964–1975: Planning and construction ===
Rolling Acres Mall was developed by Forest City Enterprises and local developer Richard B. Buchholzer (February 19, 1916 – February 6, 2006), who already collaborated to develop and open the older and smaller Chapel Hill Mall 10 miles away on October 12, 1967. The developers chose the 260-acre (110 ha) site, along Romig Road on Akron's southwestern side, between 1964 and 1966 after conducting studies which revealed that several major department stores had expressed interest in that area. In 1971, Buchholzer received a $500,000 permit to begin clearing and grading land along Romig Road for the mall's site. Developers also had to acquire two other permits from the city: one to excavate earth required to build the mall, and another for construction. In addition, the City of Akron budgeted $1.1 million toward highway and sewer improvements along Romig Road, to accommodate for the projected traffic increases brought on by the mall's opening. By mid-1973, Sears had been confirmed as the mall's first anchor store. Construction of the mall required the relocation of two natural gas lines. Serving as architect was the Keeva Kekst Association of Cleveland, Ohio.

Due to the slow speed at which Forest City Enterprises had begun land clearing and construction, then-city councilman Ray Kapper sent a letter to the developers in July 1973, threatening to repeal the zoning permit for the mall. Kapper later withdrew the repeal after representatives of Forest City Enterprises agreed to sign an assessment that included written plans for the mall's timeline. At this point, company representative Mel Roebuck had announced that in addition to Sears and 60 other stores, the mall would contain a JCPenney, and that development beyond land clearing would begin within a month. JCPenney would relocate from Wooster-Hawkins Plaza, a plaza located about 1 mile (1.6 km) to the north. This announcement caused concern among retailers at that plaza, particularly since its other anchor store, a Clarkins discount store, had just closed. Construction of the mall cost over $100 million and employed over 1,200 workers.

=== 1975–1981: Grand opening and early operations ===
The first phase of the mall, consisting of Sears and 21 other stores, opened to the public on August 6, 1975. Among the tenants open for business on that day were Sears, Rite Aid, Kinney Shoes, Chess King, Thom McAn, Waldenbooks, Claire's, B. Dalton, GNC, The Limited, and Jo-Ann Fabrics. The design of the mall featured a central court known as the Court of Twelve Trees, decorated with twelve Ficus microcarpa trees, along with planters, skylights, and a fountain. Altogether, the mall was to include over 120 tenants.

JCPenney opened its 178,000-square-foot (16,500 m^{2}) department store in January 1976, at which point the inner mall had over 50 tenants. In August 1976, General Cinema Corporation opened a three-screen movie theater at the mall, known as the Rolling Acres Cinemas. Construction on O'Neil's department store, located on the south end, began in July 1977, and a 126,000-square-foot (11,700 m^{2}) Montgomery Ward opened in October 1977. The mall also included a space along the south wing for a fifth anchor, along with an elevated section along the southern wing known as the Promenade, which included more retail space for a total of 144 stores. Upon opening in 1978, the Promenade section of the mall featured predominantly local and regional shops, along with Motherhood Maternity and Spencer Gifts. Also included in the Promenade was a food court originally known as the Prom-n-Eat, but renamed in April 1981 to Picnic Place.

=== 1980s–early 1990s ===
The opening of Montgomery Ward at the mall had resulted in that chain converting its existing Akron-area store at Akron Square Plaza into an outlet store which sold damaged, returned, or overstocked items from other stores. By 1980, the chain had decided to convert all of its eastern Ohio stores, including both Akron locations, to its discount division Jefferson Ward. Under this format, the stores were to include a greater emphasis on self-service shopping, with cash registers located solely at the exits instead of in each department. Montgomery Ward reversed this decision a year later as part of a plan to reassess the chain's profitability. Both stores were closed in early 1986 and the Rolling Acres Mall store was sold to Higbee's, which opened later the same year. The store was the twelfth in the Higbee's chain, and the first new store in over four years. After the store opened, mall management began attracting more fashion-oriented tenants to the mall, including Lane Bryant, Lerner New York, and Limited Express (all then under the same ownership as existing mall tenant The Limited), along with Caren Charles and Petite Sophisticate, two clothing chains then owned by the United States Shoe Corporation. In addition to these, the mall underwent a thorough renovation that replaced its existing earth-toned decor with blue and purple tones, while also undergoing a relandscaping of the exterior. This was followed in 1989 by the acquisition and renaming of the O'Neil's stores to May Company Ohio.

In a cost-cutting measure, Rolling Acres Mall stopped using off-duty police officers and instead relied on cheaper security guards, starting in 1991. During a showing of the film New Jack City, two movie patrons got into a fight outside of the cinema. A panicked crowd ran through the mall after patrons mistook the sound of a metal sign falling over for the sound of a gunshot.

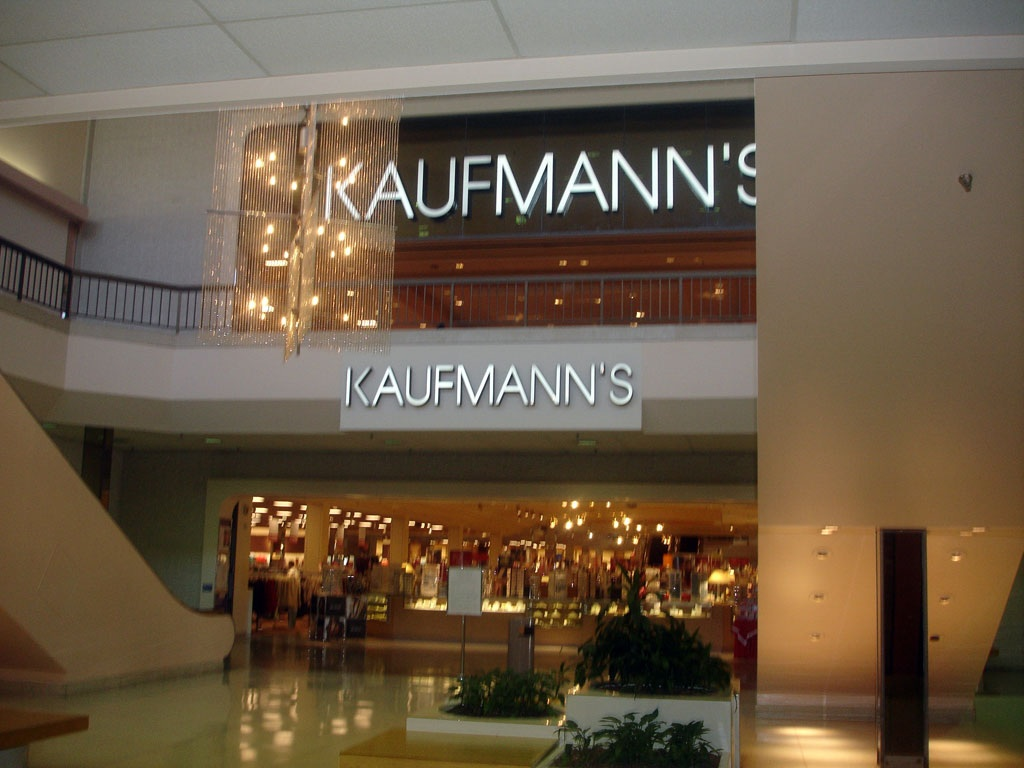
Kaufmann's (February 2006)

Two anchor stores changed names between 1992 and 1993: Dillard's purchased and renamed the entire Higbee's chain, while the May Department Stores Company consolidated the May Company Ohio stores into Kaufmann's, which they also owned at the time. Forest City Enterprises refinanced the mall in 1994, putting the money towards the development of several new restaurants inside the mall's food court. General Cinema closed the mall's movie theater in mid-1993, saying that it had been unprofitable for years due to its smaller size relative to other multiplex theaters in the area. Prior to the closure, the company had attempted to run it as a discount theater showing second-run movies for 99 cents, but doing so attracted homeless people and urban youth, both of whom would often loiter in the theater for extended periods. Combined with the theater riot two years prior, this caused a preconception among patrons and merchants that the mall had begun catering more heavily to teenagers and to lower-income clientele.

=== Mid-1990s–mid-2000s: Addition of Target and decline ===
Exterior of the Rolling Acres Cinema as it appeared in June 2009

The fifth and final anchor store to open at the mall was Target, which began construction in 1994 and opened in 1995. It was connected to the rest of the mall by a 21,000-square-foot (2,000 m^{2}) passageway that included new storefronts. This store was part of an expansion by that chain into northeastern Ohio, which was to comprise about 20 stores in total. Target representatives noted that the stores would contain merchandise mixes fitting the stores' demographics, which would be reflected in the Rolling Acres Mall location carrying cosmetics, clothing, and music that would cater to the area's predominantly African-American demographics. Despite the addition of this new store, the mall began losing tenants, and both Dillard's and JCPenney downgraded their respective stores to outlet stores between 1997 and 1999. Although JCPenney had operated several outlet stores at the time, the Rolling Acres Mall store was only the third such one to be converted from a conventional store, and employees of the store at the time told the Akron Beacon Journal that the store had experienced declining sales for many years prior to its conversion.

The mall was sold to Bankers Trust Corp. in 2000 for $33.5 million, who gave the mall a new logo as well as a website. Also, an independent group called Blind Squirrel Cinema reopened the mall's movie theaters. By November 2001, a buyer was sought by Bankers Trust. In September 2002, North Carolina businessman Heywood Whichard and his family purchased Rolling Acres for $2.75 million. A 2002 news article in The Akron Beacon Journal described the mall and the area around it as having "faltered since the early 1990s" due to perceptions of high crime and lack of renovations to the mall, compared to the renovations that Chapel Hill Mall and Summit Mall had both received in the 1990s. At the time of purchase by Heywood Whichard, Rolling Acres was about 65% occupied. The same article also noted that Heywood Whichard had a track record of buying faltering malls at low prices and making no attempt to revitalize them, to the point that many of their properties were ultimately demolished or converted to non-retail use.

=== 2006–2010: Further problems and mall closure ===
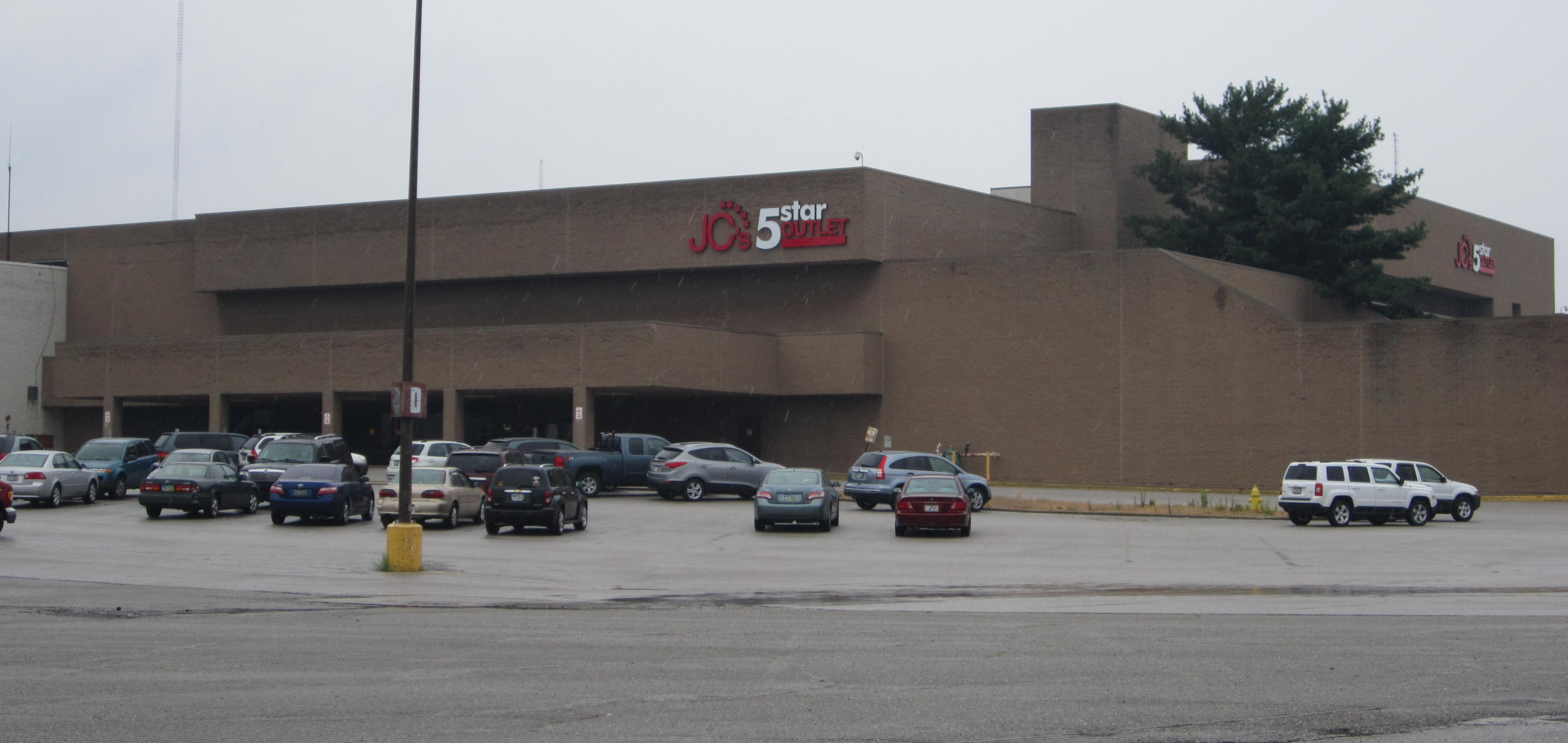
JC's 5 Star Outlet (July 2013)

The first anchor to leave the mall was Target, which relocated to nearby Wadsworth in May 2006. Dillard's closed in August 2006, one month before Kaufmann's was rebranded as Macy's as May Department Stores was acquired by Federated Department Stores. However, it was announced on December 28, 2007 that Macy's would close three stores in Ohio, with the Rolling Acres Mall location being one of the three. The store's final day of business was February 16, 2008. Invest Commercial LLC, a company owned by California-based real estate developer Michael Mirharooni, bought the facility in July 2006 for $1.6 million. Invest Commercial bought the mall using a loan from Ezri Namvar's fraudulent Namco Capital Group. At the time of purchase, the mall had about 40 remaining tenants, including Dollar General, MasterCuts, Deb Shops, Bath & Body Works, Zales Jewelers, Subway, Hershey's Ice Cream, GNC, and FootAction USA, along with a number of local independent stores. Under Mirharooni's ownership, proposals were made to convert the mall to offices, light industrial, or call centers. As part of the sale, Invest Commercial also paid over $600,000 in property taxes that had gone unpaid by Heywood Whichard. In April 2007, a homeless man was found living in an abandoned store, with over $30,000 in merchandise that he had stolen from other mall merchants. He had lived there for a month, subsisting on energy bars and drinks stolen from GNC.

By October 2008, only eight tenants remained, including Diamond's Menswear and Digital Palace. At this point, the website was shut down and all of the tenants were informed that the mall could no longer afford its electricity bill, and it would be closing as soon as possible. On October 31, 2008, the mall closed after the electricity was cut off except for Sears and JCPenney Outlet Store. Soon after, photographs and videos of the mall went viral on the internet as an example of retail apocalypse and suburban decline. On April 23, 2009, it was announced that Rolling Acres Mall had been auctioned online, and that several people showed interest in buying it for various purposes. The mall was set to be auctioned off on May 1 of that year. No bids were placed for the mall. The building was sold to Premier Ventures LLC of California in November 2010. The company announced plans to use the existing structure. The company did not pay taxes on the property, including the back taxes owed to 2006, and as a result the city of Akron began foreclosure proceedings in September 2013.

=== 2011–2017: Final store closures, interior vandalism and demolition ===
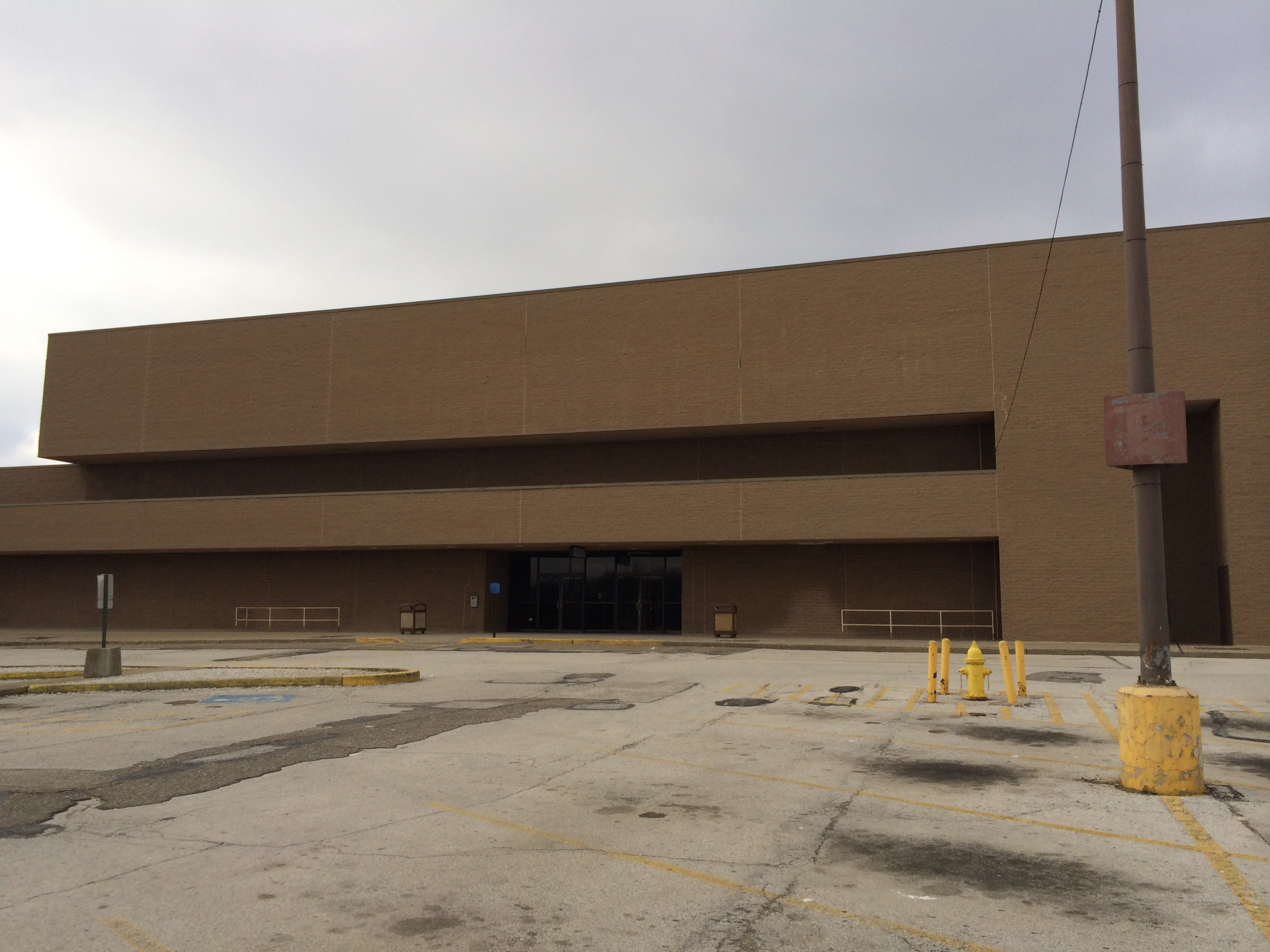
Former JCPenney (January 2014)

Shortly after the 2010 sale, Sears announced it would be closing its location at the mall, and it closed on April 3, 2011. JCPenney announced in January of that year that it would eliminate all outlet stores; nine months later, SB Capital Group purchased all JCPenney Outlet Stores with plans to rename them and continue to operate them, including the Rolling Acres store, under the name JC's 5 Star Outlet. This venture was also unsuccessful, and all of the JC's 5 Star Outlet locations were closed in October through December 2013. On December 31, 2013, the outlet store closed its doors, which left the entire mall completely abandoned.

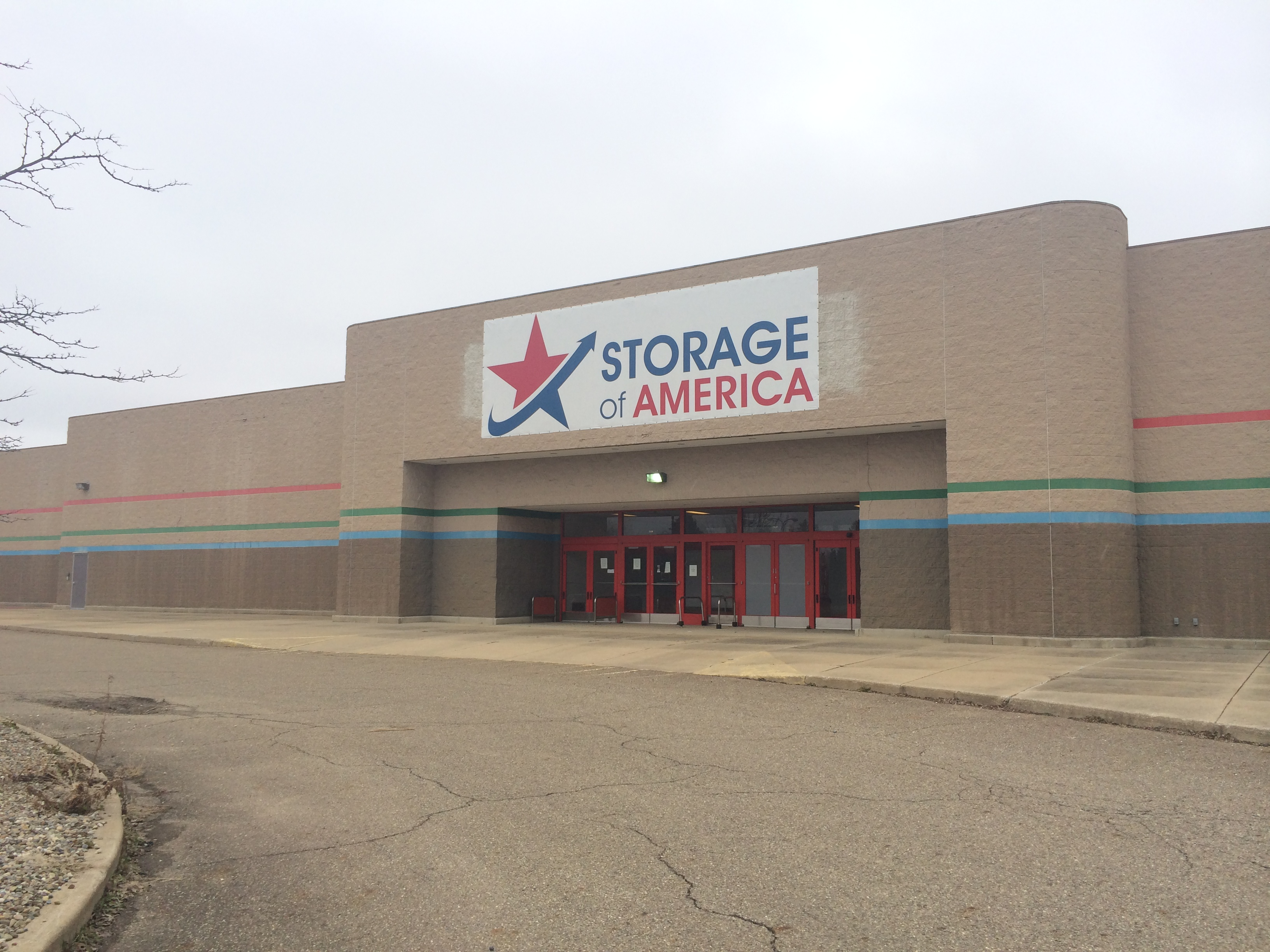
Storage of America (former Target) in March 2014

Abandoned center court with dead plants (June 2014)

A sheriff's sale was set to be held in October 2014, but was called off because of a filed bankruptcy on the part of Premier. In March 2015, it was reported that Rolling Acres Mall was severely damaged as a result of vandalism and scrappers tearing down the mall's second-floor railings for any valuable metals, particularly copper. The skylights were broken as a result of people using them as a firing range, leading to bullet holes throughout the abandoned interior of the mall. The site eventually became an attraction for drug-related activities.

The city attempted another sheriff's sale in March 2015, but it was again delayed to June 16 of that year, by an incorrect dismissal of the previous bankruptcy case. That same day, the mall was once again pulled from sheriff's sale at the last second by a second bankruptcy filing by the owner. Subsequent sheriff's sales on August 6 and October 6 also failed at the last minute by bankruptcy filings. An agreement was reached in November 2015 to force the sale of the mall while legally barring Premier from filing for bankruptcy until two months after sales proceedings ended.

After subsequent sheriff's sales failed in mid-2016, the mall was foreclosed by Summit County on June 26, 2016. This transferred ownership to City of Akron who, the council said they would seek to work with a developer and that the buildings would be demolished. Four former department store buildings are still owned by other companies. In September 2016, the former location of JCPenney was sold to the City of Akron, as it was not demolished until after the rest of the mall.

Later in 2017, demolition had finished. The former JCPenney building began demolition in August of that year, with full demolition of the main mall building completed in October. The former Target was in use as a Storage of America facility until 2017. The former Dillard's hosted Old Main Storage, a private storage company, until November 2018 and the former Sears now hosts Rumpke Trash Pickup & Recycling Services (formerly Pinnacle Paper Recycling Company). To date, the former Sears is the only part of Rolling Acres Mall that has not been demolished.

=== 2017–present: Redevelopment as Amazon Fulfillment Center AKC1 ===
In 2019, following the property's demolition, it was rumored that Amazon planned to develop a distribution facility on the site of the former mall. On July 22, 2019, a statement was issued by the City of Akron that Amazon had officially acquired the land. Construction on the new distribution center began in September. Approximately 1,500 jobs were to become available when construction was completed. The center opened on November 1, 2020.

== Notable incidents ==
=== 2011 "Craigslist Killer" incident ===
On November 25, 2011, Rolling Acres Mall was connected to the notorious "Craigslist Killer" serial killer case that occurred in the Akron area when a body later confirmed to be connected to the case was found in a shallow grave behind the mall. Earlier in the day, a phone call was made that led police to the victim's body behind the mall. The following day, November 26, Summit County medical examiner’s office identified the victim as Timothy Kern of Massillon, Ohio, whose death was caused by "gunshot wounds to the head" and ruled a homicide.

=== Other incidents ===
On April 12, 2011, a man was electrocuted after trying to steal copper from a electrical cabinet with bolt cutters, catching on fire and causing an explosion which led to an over three-hour power outage. The man later had to be identified by dental records.

On January 7, 2016, a body was reported to be hanging in a tree near Rolling Acres Mall, along Romig Road, in an apparent suicide.

== See also ==
- Forest Fair Mall, another popular now-demolished mall in Ohio
- Randall Park Mall, another two-level enclosed mall that was demolished and replaced by an Amazon Fulfillment Center
