= Belden Village Mall =

Shopping mall in Canton, Ohio, U.S.

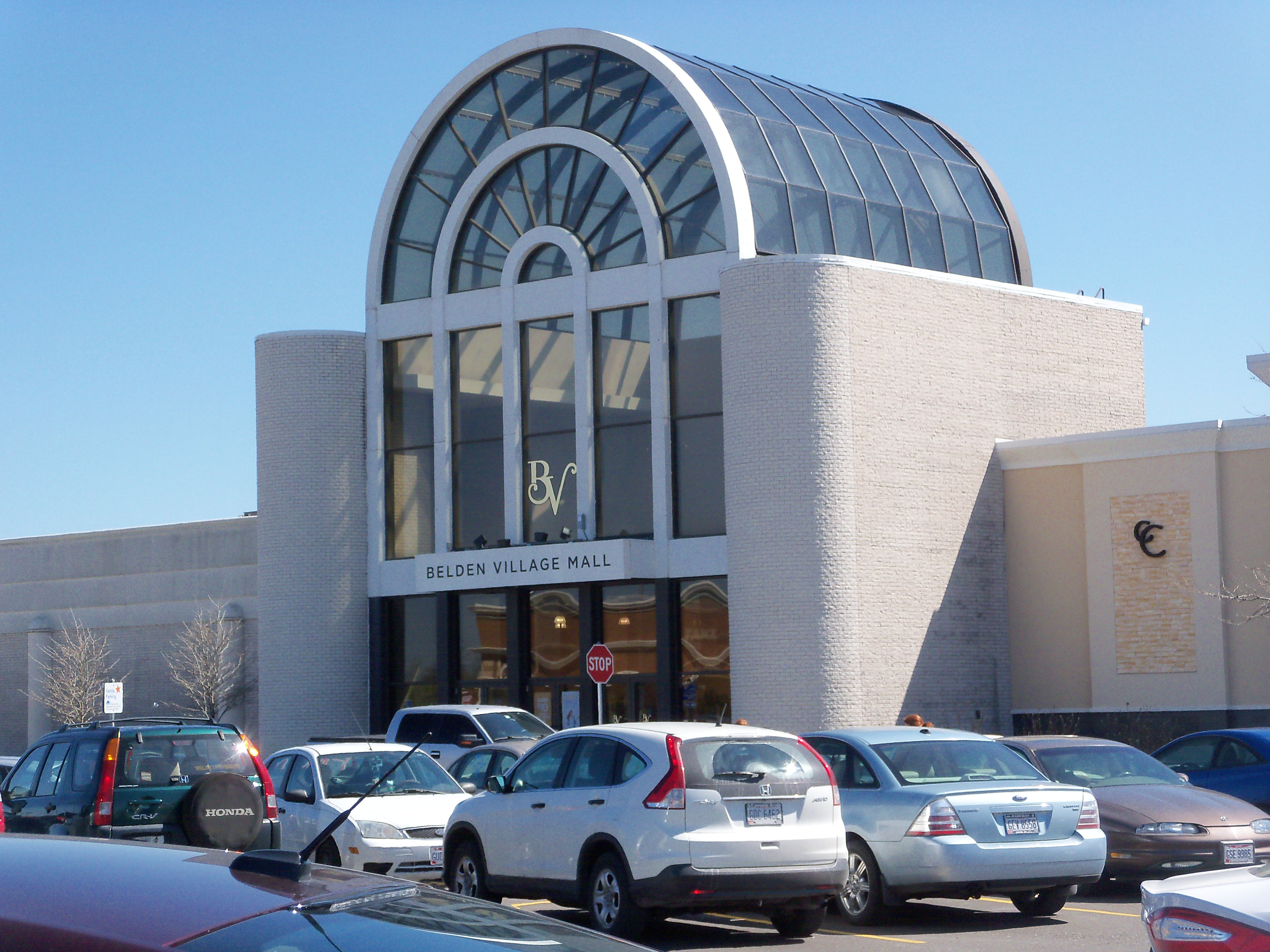
- Location: Canton, Ohio, U.S.
- Coordinates: 40°51′26″N 81°25′40″W
- Address: 4230 Belden Village Mall, Canton, OH 44718
- Opened: October 1, 1970; 56 years ago
- Developer: Richard E. Jacobs Group
- Manager: Pacific Retail Capital Partners
- Owner: Starwood Capital Group
- Num. of stores: 95
- Num. of anchor tenants: 4 (3 open, 1 under construction)
- Floor area: 890,000 sq ft (83,000 m^{2})
- Floors: 1 (2 in Dillard's and Macy's, second floor access to Dave & Buster's from mall)
- Parking: 4,064
- Public transit: SARTA
- Website: https://beldenvillagemall.com/

Belden Village Mall is a shopping mall north of Canton, Ohio, United States, in the suburb of Jackson Township. Its current anchor tenants are Dave & Buster's, Dick's Sporting Goods, Dillard's, and Macy's.

== History ==
Belden Village Mall opened October 1, 1970 as a fully enclosed shopping center. Encompassing 890,000 sq ft (83,000 m^{2}), it was anchored by O'Neil's, Sears, Higbee's and Halle's. Higbee's operated until 1992 when it was rebranded by Dillard's. O'Neil's was merged into May Company Ohio in 1989, which in turn became Kaufmann's in 1993.

Belden Village underwent a minor facelift in 1989. The food court was adorned in pastel colored flags hanging from the ceiling, along with updates to tenant signage. Major entrances were refreshed with glass atriums. The Kaufmann's store was renamed Macy's on September 9, 2006.

Outlot businesses have been added at different times to the mall. These include a Sears Auto Center (opened in 1970, closed 2020), Chili's Bar & Grille which opened in 1986, Bravo! Italian Kitchen (opened in 2006, closed in 2025), and Max & Erma's (opened in 2005, closed in 2016; later Burntwood Tavern, closed in 2026). After many years of ownership by Cleveland developers The Jacobs Group, the Westfield Group acquired the shopping center in early 2002, and renamed it "Westfield Shoppingtown Belden Village", dropping the "Shoppingtown" name in June 2005. In November 2013 Starwood Retail Partners, now Starwood Capital Group purchased several Westfield properties including Belden Village. The mall name returned to "Belden Village Mall". In the latter half of 2016, the main entrance was redone in a more modern style. Also in 2016, the Max and Erma's was closed and later converted into a Burntwood Tavern. In 2017, a former truck bay was transformed in new storefronts and a Melt Bar & Grilled. In 2019, the food court received a one-day renovation, including new furniture and lighting.

In 2015, Sears Holdings spun-off 235 of its properties, including the Sears at Belden Village Mall, into Seritage Growth Properties. Sears expected to downsize its store to 74,600 square feet (6,930 square meters) on the first floor and have part of the second floor to become Dave & Buster's. Dave & Buster's opened on November 4, 2019. On October 23, 2019, Sears announced it would close its Belden Village location after a decision not to renew its lease, and the store's last day of operation was January 12, 2020. On March 10, 2020, it was reported that around 83,000 square feet (7,700 square meters) of the former Sears is being redeveloped for Dick's Sporting Goods and Golf Galaxy, along with the former Sears Auto Center planned to be demolished for a Cheddar's Scratch Kitchen.

In March 2020, it was reported that the mall's owner, Starwood Retail Partners, defaulted on ₪910,000,000 (US$ 260,000,000) in Israeli bond loans and was forced to restructure and divest their "Starwood West" package of malls, including Belden Village. The top bidder on the package was a joint venture of Golden East Investors and Pacific Retail Capital Partners. The venture, as agreed to by Starwood's senior trustees, is designed to resolve debts and stabilize assets, ending in a potential sale.

== See also ==
- "Malls". Starwood Retail Partners. Archived from the original on November 27, 2015.
