= Sterling-Lindner Co. =

Department store in Cleveland, Ohio

Coordinates: 41°30′04.3″N 81°41′00.7″W

Sterling-Lindner Davis & Co.
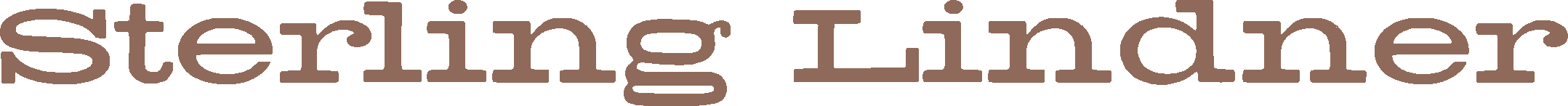

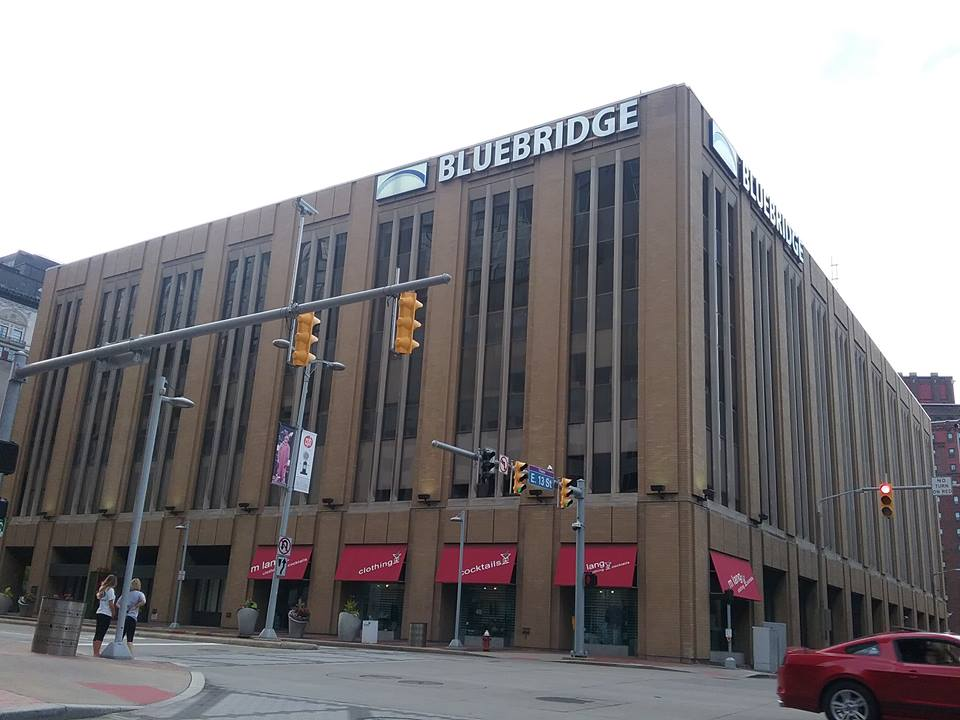
- Sterling Lindner is now the home of Bluebridge
- Company type: Department store
- Industry: Retail
- Founded: 1845 (Sterling & Welch)
- Defunct: 1968
- Fate: Sold to Allied Stores in 1949
- Headquarters: 1255 Euclid Avenue Cleveland, Ohio
- Products: Clothing, footwear, bedding, furniture, jewelry, beauty products, and housewares.
- Website: None

Sterling Lindner Davis (SLD) was a major department store in downtown Cleveland's Theater District which operated from 1845 (with the founding of Sterling & Welch) to 1968. The retailer was primarily known for displaying the largest decorated Christmas tree in the state of Ohio, this tradition started in 1927. At their peak, Cleveland's department stores (May, Higbee's, Bailey's, Taylor's, Halle, and SLD or the big six) were one of the largest shopping districts in the United States. Before the explosive growth of Cleveland's suburban post World War II housing boom, people would flock to downtown's Euclid Avenue dressed in the finery of their Sunday best to shop in these huge stores that carried everything from clothing and jewelry to furniture and housewares. Though the idea of the largest tree in Cleveland is an attributed to Higbee's in A Christmas Story in 1983, the tradition was actually that of SLD, not Higbee's, which were in fact (along with May and Halle) huge rivals and constantly attempting to outdo each other in ever growing extravagance of merchandise and audacity of style.

Sterling Lindner Davis was a conglomeration of three previously separate companies: Sterling & Welch, Lindner Co., and W. B. DavisCo. Lindner & Davis was bought by Allied Stores in 1947, which then bought out Sterling & Welch, and the store became known as Sterling Lindner Davis in 1951. The store closed to little notice (due to the birth of malls and outlets) in 1968. By the end of the 1990s, none of the "big six" Cleveland department stores was still in operation.

== See also ==
- Cleveland Theater District
- Allied Stores
