= Neighborhoods in Akron, Ohio =

== Merriman Valley (Merriman Woods and Merriman Heights) ==
Famous residents such as John S. Knight, Senator Charles Dick, presidential candidate Wendell Willkie, industrialist Paul Litchfield, and Alcoholics Anonymous founder Dr. Robert Smith, as well as the founders of the Goodyear and Firestone rubber companies, have lived here in the Merriman Heights portion.

Located between Memorial Parkway to the south and Portage Country Club, and Sand Run Park to the north, Portage Path on the west to the train tracks east of Bell Ridge Road, Merriman Heights consists of homes built between 1911 and the present and is one of Akron's wealthiest neighborhoods. Beginning with the construction of Stan Hywet Hall (by the Seiberlings, founders of Goodyear) in the early part of the 20th century, it has long been known as "Rubber Baron Heights" because all of the great captains of the rubber industry had their homes here. While its age is apparent via the quality of architecture, Merriman Heights remains as pristine as the day it was developed.

With Cuyahoga Valley National Park minutes from its doorstep and the best public schools in Akron, Merriman Heights remains one of Akron's premier neighborhoods. Homes generally start at 5000 square feet and can reach 21,000 square feet, such as Stan Hywet Hall. Most having were constructed between 1911 and 1930. A subdivision called Merriman Woods of late-midcentury-modern multi-level homes cascading down the hill from Merriman Road was built in the mid to late 1970s, and contains homes with sizes starting at around 3000 square feet to upwards of 8,000 square feet. House styles in the Heights vary from the French Norman, Large Colonial, and Georgian to Tudor, Spanish, and Renaissance Revival styles, many with indoor pools and situated on wooded lots.

== Fairlawn Heights ==
Located between Interstate 77 to the southwest and West Market Street to the northeast and bounded by Miller Road to the northwest and Frank Blvd Park to the southeast, Fairlawn Heights is a treasure trove of early to middle 20th century architecture. Once home to the Quaker Oats heiress and the like, this lovely section of Akron boasts large wooded lots nestled along a hillside, giving it the feel of being in the country when only minutes from downtown Akron and the expressway.

Houses tend to start in the 3000 sq foot range upwards to 10,000 sq feet, with most having been built in either the late 1920s early '30s, and then again from the late 1940s to the mid 1960s. Many styles of Architecture abound, with Tudor Revival being the main choice, and Georgian revival and colonial a close second, There are French Norman and French Chateaux as well as Bauhaus and mid-century modern next to large 1960s country ranches.

== Chapel Hill ==
Chapel Hill is one of Akron's two large commercial districts. Located in Northeast Akron it borders Cuyahoga Falls to the north and Tallmadge to the east. The area is mostly commercial north of Tallmadge Avenue, with a commercial and retail mix on Tallmadge Avenue. Single and multi-family residential use predominates south of Tallmadge Avenue. There is major retail development along Home Avenue, Howe Road, and Brittain Road, with the retail area anchored by the Chapel Hill Mall at the northeast corner.

Chapel Hill is accessible off Route 8 via three interchanges. Chapel Hill is one of Akron's smaller residential neighborhoods, with only 2.5% of its population and 3% of households. Chapel Hill lost a higher percentage of its population than the City during the 1990s. Although average household income is lower than in the City as a whole, there is also a lower percentage of persons in poverty. 61% of Chapel Hill residents are under 45 years of age. Chapel Hill also has a higher proportion of elderly residents than the City.

According to the City of Akron's statistics, there are 5,466 people living in 2,934 households. Chapel Hill is 79% Caucasian. The average household income (1999) is $33,930, about seven thousand lower than the city average.

== Ellet ==
Ellet is physically separated from the other neighborhoods by a highway (Interstate 76), a river (Little Cuyahoga River), and an airport.

Ellet petitioned the City of Akron for annexation in 1929. In the 1990s when Akron's total population was reduced by over three percent, Ellet started booming. Situated at the far eastern edge of Akron, it borders Mogadore to the east and Springfield Township to the south.

Ellet includes many of Akron's bigger attractions including the University of Akron's Rubber Bowl, a former city owned property that was sold to the University for only a penny. Next door is Derby Downs home of the annual All-American Soap Box Derby. The Goodyear Airdock, which used to house construction projects for Goodyear's new blimp designs, is also nearby. Today it is owned by Lockheed Martin, which runs a sizeable operation in Ellet. The Akron Fulton International Airport is also nearby. The airport is municipally owned. Annual flights to and from the airport have increased from 24,000 in 1998 to 35,000 in 2004.

The neighborhood includes numerous single-family households. Commercial activity is scattered mostly on East Market Street, part of Ohio Route 18, and Eastgate Plaza on Canton Road (Ohio State Highway 91). In recent years, new retail redevelopment has also taken place south of Hyre Park.

According to the City of Akron's statistics there are 18,132 people living in 7,892 households. Ellet is 94% Caucasian. The average household income (1999) is $40,864, representative of the city average.

== Cascade Valley ==
Cascade Valley (formerly named Elizabeth Park Valley) was developed around the old Ohio & Erie Canal in the mid-19th century. The area is located within a walking distance of Akron's downtown. Many people have old canal locks in their back yards. The park, a part of the Cascade Locks Historic District, is the site of the restored Mustill House & Store, which served as a general store to canal users from the 1820s till the end of the 19th century. The Towpath Trail, which will one day stretch from Lake Erie to New Philadelphia, brings thousands of hikers and bikers to the area each year.

According to the City of Akron's statistics, there are 4,166 people living in 1,838 households. The average household income (1999) is $28,430.

== Firestone Park ==
Harvey S. Firestone embarked on creating a neighborhood with tree-lined boulevards curved around a central park. He saw families of different income levels living together in diverse styles of homes. He saw churches, schools and stores within walking distance. When Seiberling started on his ambitious housing initiatives in Goodyear Heights, Harvey Firestone did not want to be outdone. Like Seiberling, Firestone hired his estate landscape architect, Alling S. DeForest, to design the layout for Firestone Park. Akron officials have pushed the limits of the area beyond its original borders. City publications draw the park as far south as Firestone Country Club, annexed from Coventry Township in 1985. Firestone Park is located in south Akron, bordering Coventry Twp. Firestone has easy access to two expressways, Interstate 77 and Interstate 277 / U.S. Highway 224.

The 2000 U.S. census can explain the attraction objectively. It paints a portrait of an educated working-class population with good incomes and home values. Firestone Park, a public park shaped like the original Firestone shield emblem, is at the heart of the community. It is surrounded by churches, a school, a community center, a new library, and a small business district.

== Goodyear Heights ==
As early as 1910 Frank A. Seiberling, founder and then president of the Goodyear Tire and Rubber Co., realized how detrimental the housing shortage was to his workers and his company. Even though labor was abundant, Seiberling believed that the transient nature of the workforce cost the company a great deal. Training wasn’t cheap, and the cost of constantly retraining new employees was proving unmanageable. To solve this problem, Seiberling proposed purchasing a large parcel of farmland half a mile from the Goodyear factories. The board was not convinced. The company felt that it was too risky to get involved in the intimate affairs of their employees. However, Seiberling was so committed to the project that he bought the land himself. Seiberling chose a rural plot of land just northeast of Goodyear's main plant.

Seiberling hired his personal landscape architect to spearhead the project. He chose sweeping streets over a grid infrastructure and included provision for all modern conveniences like gas, electricity, and telephones. The main thoroughfares were also designed to eventually carry streetcars. One of the key differences between Goodyear Heights and Firestone Park was the hospitality extended to non-employees for the purchase of a home. Though Goodyear opened the door of purchasing a home to all Akron residents, the 25% increase in selling price and the lack of company sponsored financing made it very unlikely that non-Goodyear employees would buy. Goodyear Heights Realty had an explicit policy against selling to African Americans.

Goodyear Heights borders Tallmadge to the east and has access to I-76. Goodyear Heights remains an overwhelmingly single-family residential community. There is neighborhood-level retail development at Six Corners. Eastwood Avenue near Darrow Road borders suburban-style strip shopping centers. Goodyear Heights Metropolitan Park provides a wide range of recreational activities to people throughout the area. Though the majority of the housing was constructed between 1940 and 1980, the city has been buying up land to build new developments, the latest one being built along Honodle.

According to the City of Akron's statistics there are 20,556 people living in 8,817 households. The average household income (1999) is $42,746, slightly higher than the city average.

== Highland Square ==
Highland Square is known as one of the more eclectic areas of Akron. It is a pleasant and walkable residential area featuring an organic grocery store, a library, a theater, several restaurants, and some nightclubs and bars. The Square is considered the Arts and hip urbanite district of Akron. Its large number of historical and modern apartment complexes mean that it is more densely populated than the rest of Akron, in which single unit homes are more common. Many of these apartments line the neighborhood's major thoroughfare, West Market Street, making them very accessible. Highland Square is strongly progressive; John Kerry’s Summit County Headquarters was located in a Highland Square storefront during the 2004 Presidential Election.

Many members of the LGBT community have made their home here and many businesses are either gay owned or gay friendly. Although Highland Square is sexually diverse and progressive, it is not as ethnically diverse as other parts of Akron. The commercial part of Highland Square is anchored by the historic Highland Theatre. The Highland Square Neighborhood Association works to maintain the character and atmosphere of the area. Every summer the association promotes and operates Music and Arts Festival, a festival featuring local artists, performers and musicians performing on residential porches and lawns and drawing well over 5,000 people to the neighborhood.

Many artists and musicians make their home in Highland Square and their influence and work can be found in the shops and public art found in the neighborhood.

The region's oldest feature is the Portage Path, which passes along the street of that name. For decades the statue of an Indian has watched over this famous pathway where Native Americans carried their canoes between the Cuyahoga and Tuscarawas Rivers. The Portage Path was part of the effective western boundary of the white and Native American lands from 1785 to 1805. When first erected by Gus Kasch, an area real estate developer, the Indian statue stood along the curb on West Market Street. The refurbished statue now stands on a landscaped site on the corner of Portage Path and West Market Street.

According to The City of Akron's statistics there are 12,561 people living in 6,264 households. The average household income (1999) is $42,958, slightly higher than the city average.

== Northwest Akron ==
Situated north of Walhaven between North Portage Path in the east, Sand Run Road in the west, and Sand Run Parkway and the city limits in the north.

== Wallhaven (Sunset View, Hunter's Lodge and Castle) ==
Situated at the intersections of Market Ave, Exchange St, and Hawkins Ave. Wallhaven is a commercial and rental residential district which houses many of Akron's original and unique points of interest such as: Swensons Hamburger stand, here in its original location (1934) offering some of the best burgers in Akron owing to its secret recipe for hamburger meat; and Ken Stewart's Grille, one of Akron's finest dining experiences. You will also find many essentials here such as banks, bagels, Dry Cleaners, Pharmacies, a Robek's smoothies shop and many others. The Subdivision of Sunset View (houses range from 2200 sq feet to 7500 sq ft and from $190,000 to $380,000) is full of large older houses equal to the size of those found in Merriman Heights and is bounded by Storer Ave and Delia, to the East and South, and Exchange to Elmdale on the North and West.

Developed mostly between the early 1920s to the mid 1930s. Its Akron's third premier vintage Housing neighborhood After Merriman Heights and Fairlawn Heights. The O'Neil Mansion, built by William O'Neil (founder of General Tire), is located at the Corner of Mull and Exchange at the center of Sunset View. Castle (1700 sq feet to 2800 sq ft and from $130,000 to the mid-two hundreds) is Located around Castle Boulevard and is bounded by castle like monikers at its entrances off Market, Centered by Castle Boulevard itself. Many attractive homes from the mid-1920s to the mid-1930 line the streets of this area. Hunters Lodge (1500 sq ft to 2400 sq ft and from 100,000 to $150,000) is the area from Mull to Hawkins and boarded by Exchange and Delia, Built on the land that was once used by many of Akron's prominent families as a place to ride horses and hunt. Its Centered by Hunter's Lodge Park whose center piece is the lodge itself.

Though many Akronites have forgotten the names of Hunter's Lodge, Castle and Sunset View; the residents of all three subdivisions pride themselves in the rich long history of their Developments. Sunset View especially since it was built on the grounds of an older sanitarium of the same name. Of interest are the homes along Market Starting at Portage Path and ending at Elmdale. At one time this was considered Millionaires row and you will find many of the large mansions tucked along this stretch of market either as private residences, offices or schools such as Our Lady Of The Elms, an all girls school (considered one of the top 10 in Ohio), which occupies what was once a Renaissance Revival Mansion barring the name The Elms. Others include Breaside (The Belles Arts, Galt family, Mansion), and several of the Firestone Mansions (which range from French Chateau to Georgian and Edwardian), as well as Rocky Knoll which was torn down to build the Rockynol Retirement Community.

== Kenmore ==
Following the trolley right-of-way between southwest Akron and Barberton, Kenmore, named after Kenmore House in Virginia, developed rapidly between 1910 and 1920 as a new residential area. It was incorporated as a self-sufficient city supporting its own doctors, lawyers, and churches. Kenmore Boulevard served as the retail and commercial center. In 1929 residents of the then City of Kenmore asked to be annexed by the City of Akron. Kenmore is located in the southwest region of Akron and is bisected by Interstate 277 and U.S. Highway 224.

According to The City of Akron's statistics there are 18,239 people living in 7,998 households. Kenmore is 90% Caucasian. The average household income (1999) is $39,776.

== Sherbondy Hill ==
The Sherbondy Hill neighborhood (formerly named Lane-Wooster) is located just west of downtown Akron. In the early 20th century, the area became home to African-American families who were moving to Akron from the south. The Akron Zoo, which has recently been remodelled, is located in the Sherbondy Hill area. Miller South School for the Visual and Performing Arts, draws children from all parts of Summit County. It serves children from 4th grade to 8th grade. Wooster Avenue was renamed Vernon Odom Boulevard, a nod to the neighborhood's African American heritage. The area is the largest black neighborhood in Akron, with 87% of residents identifying themselves as such.

During the 1970s, the Innerbelt was built and some 3,000 families were displaced. It continues to be a disputed call if the Innerbelt has benefited the inner city; proponents have said it is an essential throughway for Akron's impending growth, while dissenters contend that it has caused Akron to lose some of its cohesiveness.

Sherbondy Hill is accessible from three highways, The Martin Luther King Jr. Freeway, Interstate 76 and Interstate 77. According to The City of Akron's statistics there are 9,329 people living in 4,132 households. The average household income (1999) is $28,804.

== Middlebury ==
The village of Middlebury on the Little Cuyahoga River was the first settlement in what is now Akron. Middlebury is located immediately east of the University of Akron. Middlebury is home to Goodyear Tire and Rubber Company's world headquarters and Summa Hospital. Middlebury is accessible by both Interstate 76 to the south, and Ohio State Highway 8 to the east. Middlebury is the most diversified out of the Akron neighborhoods, with almost six percent of ethnic backgrounds being neither African American nor Caucasian.

In the 2000 census, average household income was 74% of average household income in Akron. Even though household income lagged the City, there was a large percentage drop in persons in poverty and an almost equally large rise in average household income. Middlebury has the highest percentage of pre-1940 housing stock of any City neighborhood. Although some new construction occurred between 1940 and 1980, new housing development was slow in the 1990s.

According to the City of Akron's statistics there are 8,062 people living in 3,445 households. The average household income (1999) is $30,600.

== North Hill ==
North Hill served as one of the melting pots during Akron's expansion and soon many Italians were settling down in the area. The main roads still have low-rise commercial buildings, scattered in between the used car lots and mechanics. Many blame North Hill's problems on the closure of the deteriorated viaduct that connected North Hill to downtown Akron. The All-American Bridge restored the tie in 1981, but things have been slow to improve. The motorists eventually returned, but few businesses did. They bypassed North Hill's aging buildings and limited parking for places like the nearby shopping hub of Chapel Hill, which exploded in the 1980s. Many authentic Italian eateries still stand, harkening back to the old North Hill, when Italian immigrants turned this area into an Old World village where they could speak their native language and partake in the traditions of their homeland. Although the area still has pockets of Italians, the area has largely diversified since the great white flight. According to the U.S. Census, the share of North Hill residents claiming at least partial Italian ancestry was 20% in 1980, 17% in 1990, and 15% in 2000.

According to the City of Akron's statistics there are 16,272 people living in 7,048 households. North Hill is 73% Caucasian. The average household income (1999) is $40,240, which is representative of the city's average.

== Rolling Acres (Now a part of Kenmore) ==
With just more than 1,000 housing units, Rolling Acres was the least residential of Akron's 25 neighborhoods. Rolling Acres, like Chapel Hill, was a major commercial hub, stationed at the south-western border of Akron. The now-defunct Rolling Acres Mall was once the neighborhood's anchor. Rolling Acres had more undeveloped land than is typical of Akron neighborhoods. The Rolling Acres Mall and big box retail once dominated Romig Road. Romig Road is now largely barren, owing to the closure of Rolling Acres Mall.

East Avenue has mixed retail and residential use. Auto dealers and a mix of retail and office uses exist along Vernon Odom Boulevard. Although the Rolling Acres area is not thought of first as a residential area, proposals regarding the commitment of additional land to residential development are continually under consideration. The Mud Run Golf Course was in the center of the neighborhood. The largest residential areas are west of East Avenue. Rolling Acres had 1,120 housing units with 2,414 people living in the area. There was a lower percentage of children in this neighborhood than Akron has on the whole. The average household income (1999) was $41,467 which was just above the city average.

== University Park ==
The University of Akron campus dominates the University Park neighborhood. Areas south and east of the University remain working class, with a significant mix of student rental housing. A neighborhood retail cluster on Exchange Street called Spicertown serves the area, as well as retail shops along East Market Street. University Park is accessible by both Interstate 76 to the south, and Ohio State Highway 8. With over 90% of the population under 45 years of age, the University Park area is primarily home to young adults. The dominant age group is persons from 20 – 44 years of age. Over half of adults 25 and over have at least some college. Over 23% of University Park residents have attained either college or graduate degrees, higher than the city average. University Park has slightly higher percentages of Whites and ethnic groups other than African-Americans than Akron has as a whole.

According to the City of Akron's statistics there are 9,012 people living in 3,537 households. University Park is 70% Caucasian. The average household income (1999) is $30,799, 75% of Akron as a whole.

=== Spicertown ===
Spicertown is in the area around Spicer and East Exchange Streets. Originally settled by Major Minor Spicer and his family in 1810–1811, Spicertown's population increased steadily over the following 25 years due to an influx of German immigrants.

Due to the efforts of community leaders, Spicertown managed to escape being included within the Village of Akron during its incorporation in 1836. However once Akron became a city in 1865, Spicertown lost its political distinction.

Today, the Spicertown area is an eclectic mix of small shops and college housing on the southern edge of The University of Akron. One of the area's most well known residents is Don Drumm whose art studio and gallery, which showcases the contemporary artwork of more than 500 N. American artisans, has become well known throughout the region.
