= The Ontario Center =

- Location: Ontario, Ohio, U.S.
- Coordinates: 40.77068°N 82.59344°W
- Address: 2209 Richland Mall, Ontario, OH 44906
- Opened: 1969
- Developer: Jacobs Visconsi Jacobs
- Manager: Brait Capital
- Owner: Brait Fund
- Num. of stores: 45
- Num. of anchor tenants: 1
- Floor area: 733,633 square feet (68,156.7 m^{2})
- Floors: 1 (2 in JCPenney, Rural King, and Avita Ontario Pharmacy, 3 in Avita Ontario Hospital)
- Public transit: Richland County Transit (RCT)
- Website: theontariocenter.com

The Ontario Center, previously Richland Mall until 2024, is a shopping mall in Ontario, Ohio, near the city of Mansfield, Ohio. It opened in 1969 with Lazarus, Sears, and O'Neil's as its anchor stores. As of 2026, the only traditional retail anchor remaining is JCPenney, and three vacated anchor spaces were converted into new properties by Rural King and the Avita Health System.

== History ==
Richland Mall opened in 1969 in the Mansfield suburb of Ontario near US 30. It occupied a 64-acre site, with Lazarus, Sears, and O'Neil's (later May Company Ohio, then Kaufmann's) as its anchor stores. Jacobs Visconsi Jacobs developed the property, and first announced it in 1966. The Lazarus store was its first location outside the Columbus, Ohio market.

A 1997 expansion added JCPenney and 108,000 square feet of retail space. The Lazarus store was re-branded Lazarus-Macy's in 2003, and then just Macy's in 2005. Only a year later, Macy's relocated from the former Lazarus to the former Kaufmann's. Macy's previous location in the old Lazarus was later repurposed as a haunted house. The mall in 2002 was renamed by Westfield Group as Westfield Shoppingtown Richland for a period of time, is once again called Richland Mall following the mall sale by Westfield Group to Centro Watt in 2006.

In 2012, Brixmor announced that they hired a new manager for this mall: Madison Marquette. Brixmor retained as mall owner.

In October 2013, Avita Health System announced their purchase of the former Lazarus store. The 17-acre former store was overhauled into state of the art doctors offices in December 2014. The space was chosen from the convenient location and the sturdy foundation.

In 2015, a judge ordered a sale of the mall after its then-owners Centro Richland LLC, accumulated $37 million in debts. In early March 2017, Avita Health System opened the final stage of their newest additions to the Avita Ontario Hospital including, a 7-bed ICU, a 19-bed inpatient wing, a 16-bed pre/post op area, 4 surgical suites, and a full service cafe/kitchen. Avita Ontario Pharmacy opened in the former Sears around this time.

In 2018, the mall was sold by Wells Fargo to Richland Mall Holdings; mall management was retained. On August 6, 2019, Sears announced they would be closing their Richland Mall location with liquidation sales starting on August 15 and closed in October.

In 2020, Chuck E. Cheese closed when the company filed for bankruptcy due to the COVID-19 pandemic. On March 21, 2021, two months after announcing it would close 46 of its stores nationwide, Macy's closed its store there, leaving JCPenney as its sole anchor store.

In April 2024, Brait Fund acquired Richland Mall for $4 million and renamed it The Ontario Center, planning an additional $10 million investment over the next three years. Considering offering gym space, daycare, expanded food options, and other possibilities to serve the community, Brait wants to maintain current retailers and attract new entrepreneurs.

In 2024, Avita Health System purchased the former Sears anchor building and converted the anchor space into a pharmacy and comprehensive cancer center. The new Avita Health System building is to be the southern campus of Avita Health’s Ontario Center campus. Renovated at a cost of $15 million, the 20,000 square foot (1858.1 m²) facility opened in fall 2025.

In January, 2026, Rural King purchased the former Macy’s store with the intention of opening a new store in the former Macy’s building. This new store is part of Rural King’s expansion across the United States. Rural King renovated the existing building throughout 2026 and eventually opened the store with grand opening festivities taking place between July 10, 2026 and July 12, 2026.

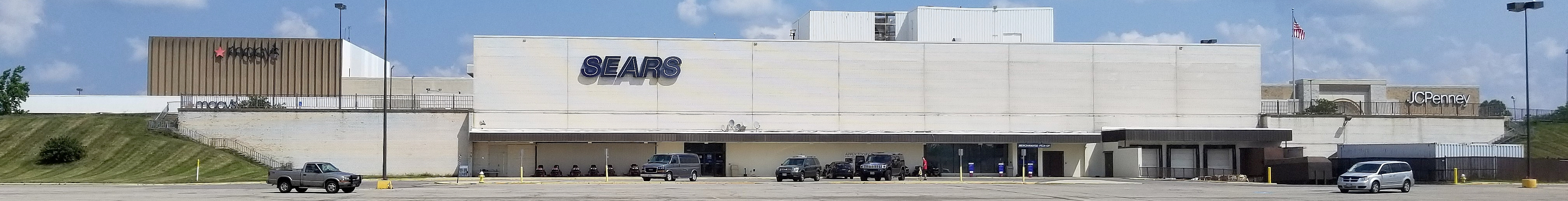
Richland Mall in 2018
