= O'Neil's =

American department store chain

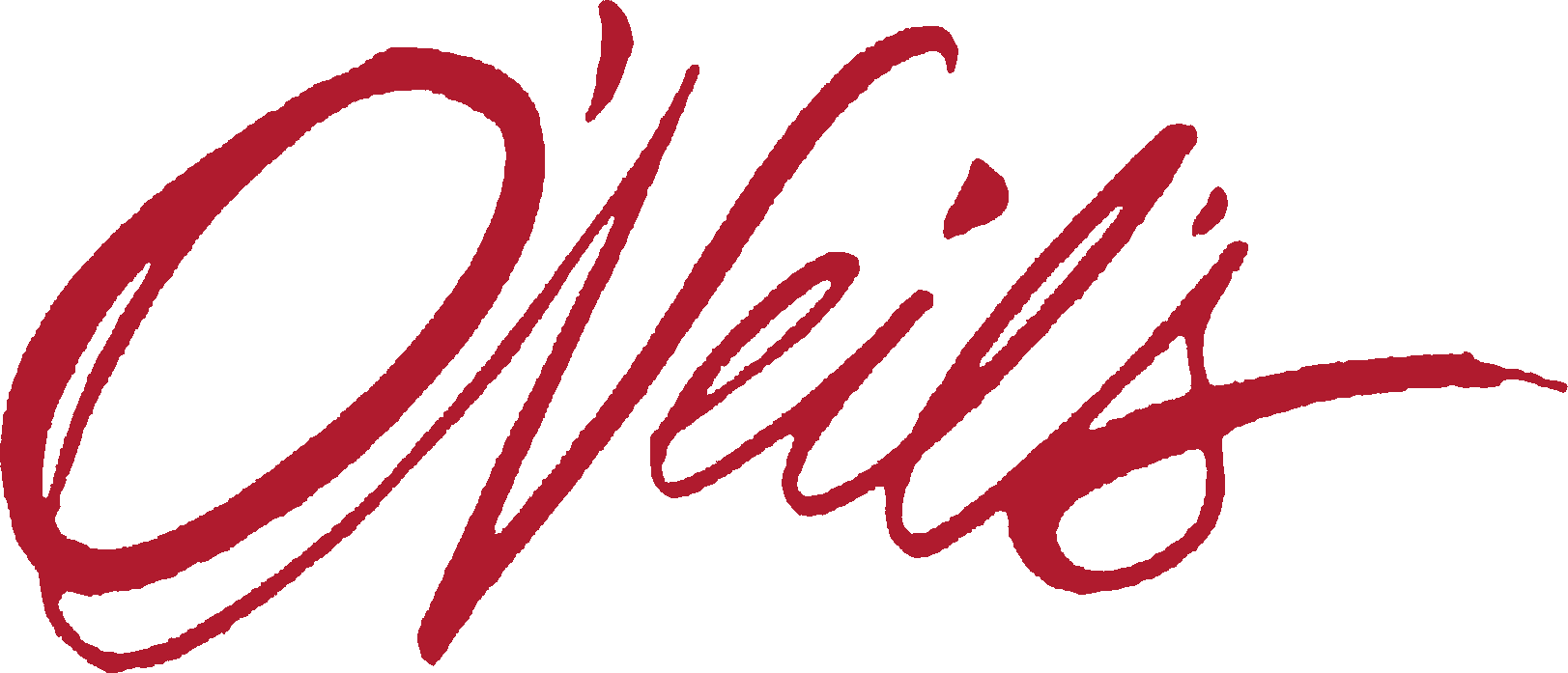

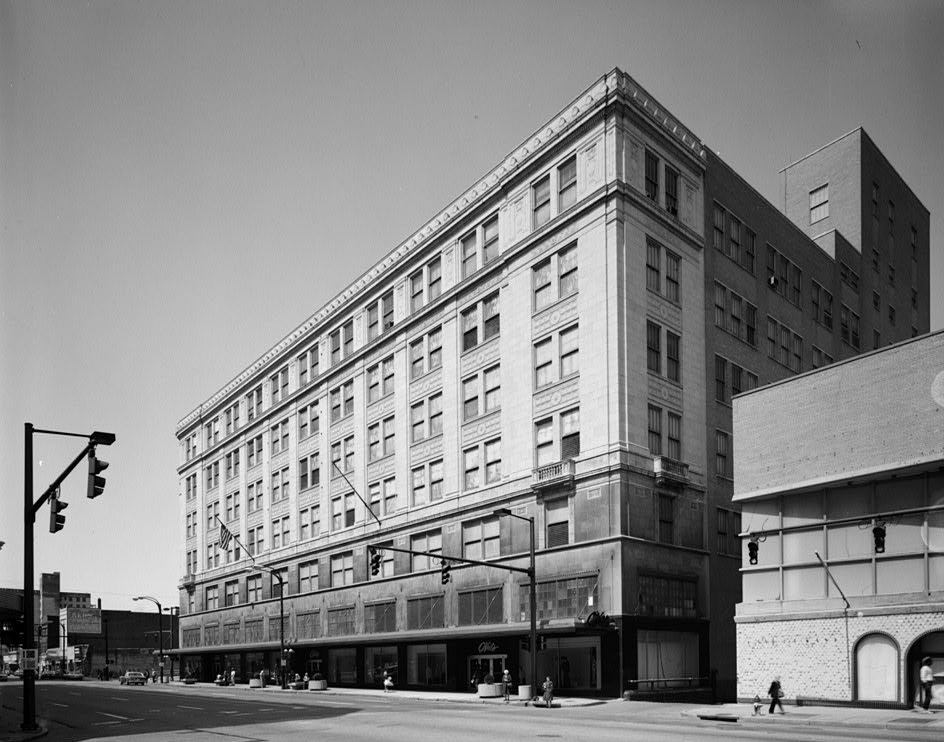
- Exterior of the former flagship store in Akron (1983)
- Formerly: The M. O'Neil Co.
- Company type: Subsidiary
- Industry: Retail
- Genre: Department stores
- Founded: 1877; 149 years ago in Akron, Ohio, United States
- Founders: Michael O'Neil; Isaac Dyas
- Defunct: 1989; 37 years ago
- Fate: Merged with May Company Ohio
- Successor: May Company Ohio
- Headquarters: Akron, Ohio, United States
- Parent: The May Department Stores Company (1912–1989)

O'Neil's was an American department store chain founded in 1877 by Michael O'Neil and Isaac Dyas. It dominated the Akron and Canton retail markets. Founded in 1877, the store grew to several locations in northeastern Ohio. In 1912, it was owned by May Department Stores, and in 1989 May merged it with its Cleveland division to form May Company Ohio, which was subsequently merged into its Pittsburgh division, Kaufmann's, in 1993.

== History ==
O'Neil's began in 1877, when Irishmen Michael O'Neil and Isaac Dyas opened a dry goods store at 114 East Market Street. On the death of Dyas in 1892, the store became the M. O'Neil Co. Acquired by May Department Stores for $1 million in 1912, it opened a new store in downtown Akron in 1927 that remained through the late 1980s. It eventually came to operate stores throughout the Akron and Canton areas. In 1989 the main store in downtown Akron was closed, and its remaining locations merged with May Company Ohio. With the merger, the O'Neil's name was retired.

Branch stores in later years were at Summit Mall in Fairlawn, Chapel Hill and Rolling Acres malls in Akron, Belden Village and Mellett/Canton Centre malls in Canton, 30th Street Plaza in Canton, Stow-Kent Plaza in Stow, Richland Mall in Ontario, and in Coshocton. Earlier branches included stores in downtown Canton, Lorain, Alliance, Massillon and Mansfield and in the Akron suburbs of Cuyahoga Falls, Barberton and Fairlawn (at Fairlawn Plaza).

The downtown Akron O'Neil's department store featured large display windows along the front and sides of the massive store where seasonal displays were set up for viewing by the public. During the holiday season, large elaborate animated displays of elves in Santa's workshop, nutcrackers, teddy bears, trains and various toys played under Christmas trees. These displays were a main feature of downtown Akron during the holiday season, along with the displays in the windows of O'Neil's rival store, Polsky's, directly across South Main Street.

== See also ==
- List of defunct department stores of the United States
- List of department stores converted to Macy's
