= Summit Mall =

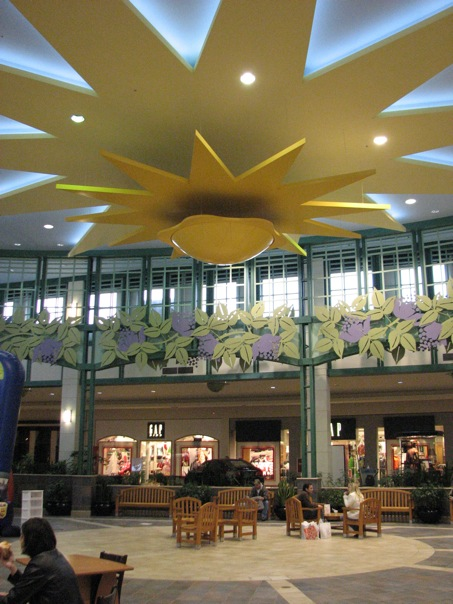
- The mall's center court.
- Location: Fairlawn, Ohio, U.S.
- Coordinates: 41.13216°N 81.61830°W
- Opened: October 28, 1965; 61 years ago
- Developer: Edward J. DeBartolo Corporation
- Manager: Simon Property Group
- Owner: Simon Property Group
- Num. of stores: 100+
- Num. of anchor tenants: 3
- Floor area: 850,000 sq ft (79,000 m^{2})
- Floors: 1 (2 in Macy's and Dillard's)
- Parking: 7,500 Spaces, Lit Parking Lot
- Public transit: METRO
- Website: www.simon.com/mall/summit-mall

Summit Mall is a one-story, 850,000-square-foot (79,000 m^{2}) enclosed regional shopping mall located at 3265 West Market Street in the Akron suburb of Fairlawn, Ohio. It is the only remaining mall in Summit County.

Developed by the Edward J. DeBartolo Corporation the mall opened on October 28, 1965. Today, it is owned by Simon Property Group. Currently, Summit Mall contains space for 100+ stores and eateries.The mall features Macy's, a dual Dillard's configuration (Dillard's and Dillard's Men's and Children's), and a food court.

== History ==
=== Development and early years ===
DeBartolo Corporation developed Summit Mall. First announced in 1963, the mall opened to the public in 1965. The original anchor stores were Cleveland, Ohio-based Halle Brothers Co. and two other department stores both based in Akron: O'Neil's and Polsky's. Other major tenants included Woolworth, Kroger, and Acme Markets. In November of 1978 it was announced that Polsky's would be closing by December 30, 1978.

=== Late 20th century ===
After Halle's 1982 shutdown, their location was transferred to Higbee's, which operated the store until it was taken over by Dillard's in late 1992. It was a full-line location (without housewares) until 1998 when the men's department relocated to the top floor of the former Polsky's / Jewel Mart space. After Polsky's closed, Jewel Mart occupied the main floor level. In July 1986, a Dallas businessman proposed opening a laser tag facility in the basement of the former Polsky's. In July 1989, National Theatre Corporation (now Regal Entertainment Group) closed the two-screen theater at the mall when General Cinemas opened up a new theater at West Market Plaza. O'Neil's became May Company Ohio by the end of 1989. By July 1990, Rizzi's Ristorante and Pizzeria and Charlotte's West occupied the space on the half-vacant lower level. Jewel Mart was gone by 1991 and the top floor remained vacant until Dillard's expanded their store to occupy both levels. May Company then turned to Kaufmann's in 1993.

=== 2000's – present ===
Rizzi's and Charlotte's West were both gone by 2004, giving Dillard's the opportunity to renovate both floors as a Dillard's Women's store. May Company became Macy's in 2006. In January 2013, Williams-Sonoma announced it would close its location in the mall. In January 2017, Ann Taylor also closed at the mall.
