= May Company Ohio =

American department store chain

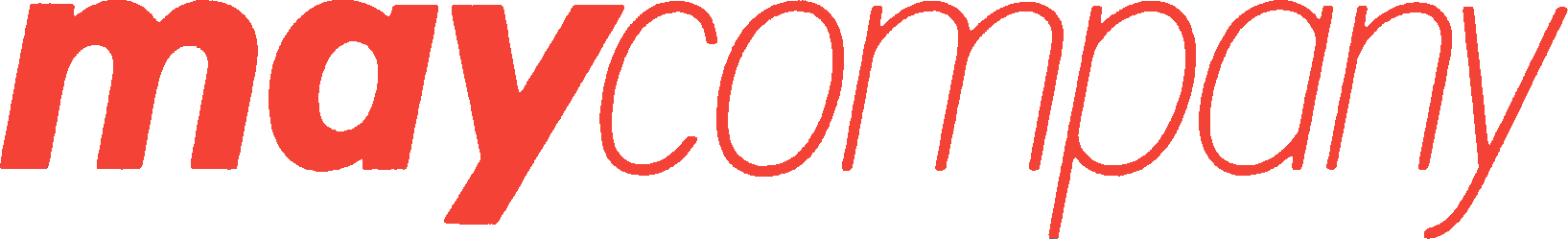

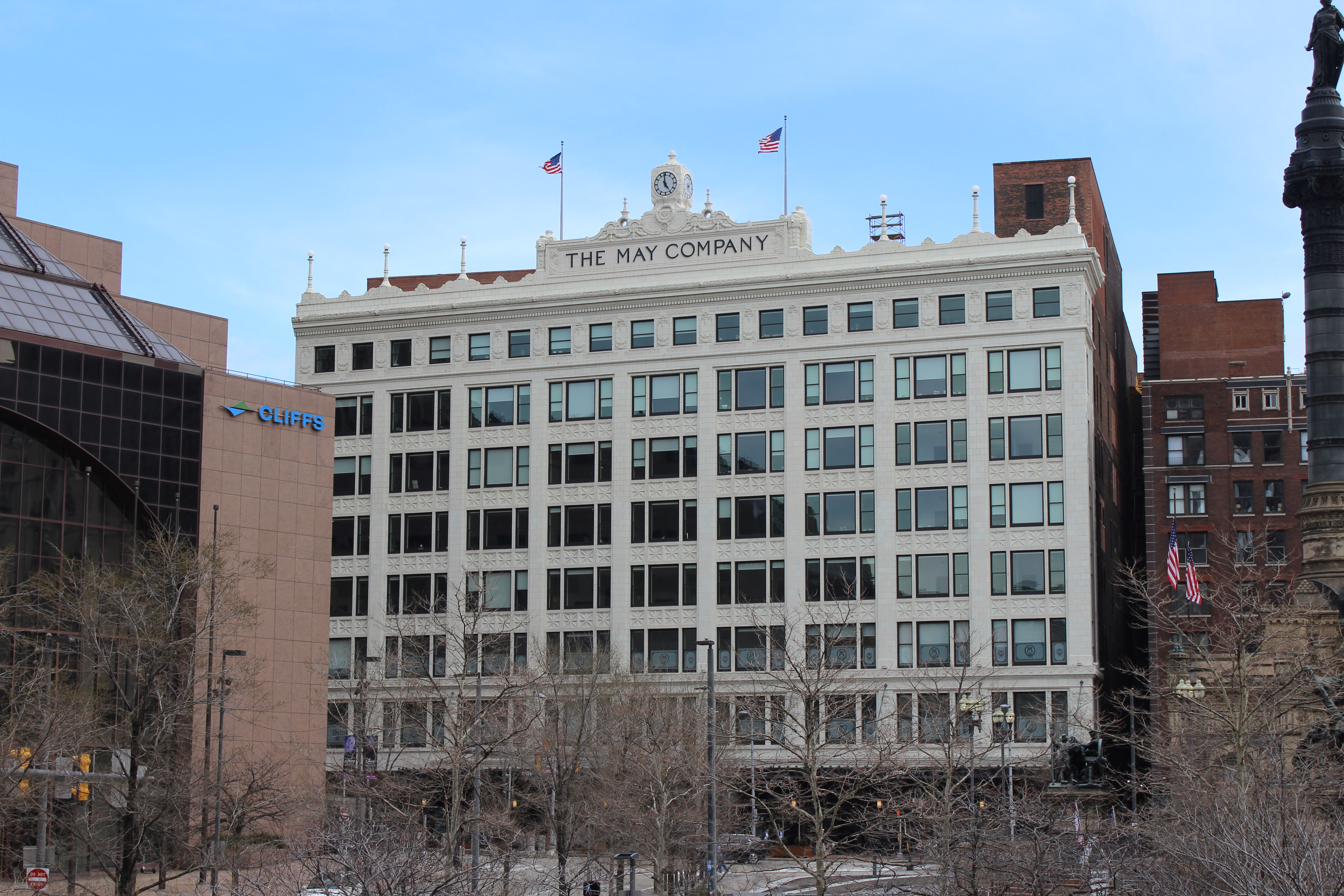
- Exterior of the former flagship store in Cleveland (2023)
- Type: Division
- Industry: Retail
- Predecessors: E. R. Hull & Dutton Co.; William Taylor Son & Co.; O'Neil's
- Founded: 1899; 127 years ago
- Founder: David May
- Defunct: January 31, 1993; 33 years ago
- Fate: Rebranded by The May Department Stores Company
- Successor: Kaufmann's
- Headquarters: Cleveland, Ohio, United States
- Products: Clothing; footwear; bedding; furniture; jewelry; beauty products; housewares
- Parent: The May Department Stores Company

May Company Ohio was an American department store chain that was headquartered in Cleveland, Ohio. It originated with the purchase and renaming of the E. R. Hull & Dutton Co. by David May in 1899, and expanded with his majority ownership of William Taylor Son & Co. in 1939 and suburban growth in the 1950s. The May Department Stores Company merged O'Neil's into May Company Ohio in 1989, and May Company Ohio itself was merged into, and converted to, Kaufmann's in 1993.

== History ==
In 1899, David May, the founder of May Department Stores, acquired E. R. Hull & Dutton Co. of Cleveland on Ontario Street, renaming it May Company, Cleveland. In 1914 May added an additional landmark building on Euclid Avenue, fronting on the southeast corner of Public Square. The high-rise building stands 149 feet and contains 8 floors of space, though floors 7 and 8 were not added until 1931. In 1939 May Co. acquired majority control of another Cleveland store, William Taylor Son & Co., which maintained a separate identity until 1961.

=== Suburban expansion ===
Expansion to the suburbs began in the 1950s, with Sheffield Shopping Center, Lorain in 1953 (originally opened as an O'Neil's store which was a May Company subsidiary and then changed over to a May Company location in April, 1967) and Cedar-Center Plaza at Cedar and Warrensville Roads in University Heights in late 1956 (known locally as "May's on the Heights"). In 1960 a branch was opened at Parmatown Mall in Parma, and another in 1961 at Southgate Shopping Center in Maple Heights (the Southgate store having been originally opened in 1958 by William Taylor & Son Co.). Several mall stores followed in the 1960s and 1970s, including Great Lakes Mall (1964) Great Northern Mall (Ohio) in North Olmsted (1965), Randall Park Mall in North Randall (1976), Euclid Square Mall in Euclid (1977) and Sandusky Mall in Sandusky (1979).

The company also constructed a nine-story warehouse (six stories tall, with three sub-basements) attached to the south side of the Cedar Center Store, designed to handle furniture distribution for Cleveland's eastside. The red brick facility, designed to look like an integrated part of the colossal three- story (plus basement) store was used for a short time, but remained empty from 1960 until the University Heights store was demolished and re-built in 2002 by this time it was re-branded as Kaufmann's.

The May Company specialized in mid to higher-end fashion merchandise and home furnishings, but target price points placed May Company merchandise at, or below its two major competitors in the Cleveland market Higbee's and Halle's. May Company was the first local department store to issue its own gray and white personal charge card, announcing it on July 16, 1966 in a Cleveland Plain Dealer article, breaking away from being part of the Department Stores Charge Plate (a metal card that was notched for each store and used at all participating members which included William Taylor Son & Co., Bailey's, Sterling-Lindner-Davis, The Higbee Company and The Halle Bros. Co.) Higbee's and Halle's continued to remain part of this system until they each issued their plastic charge cards respectively in 1969, the other stores having gone out of business.

In addition to its merchandise, the company was known for its sponsorship of the Eagle Stamp program. Consumers could earn Eagle Stamps on purchases at The May Company as well as on purchases at Pick-N-Pay Supermarkets, Leader Drug Stores, and participating gas stations and dry cleaners. Completed stamp booklets could be redeemed at May Company for $3 credits toward merchandise purchases at May Company stores. The trading stamp program was administered by the May Company-owned Eagle Stamp Company of St. Louis from 1903 to 1987.

=== Merger with O'Neil's and conversion to Kaufmann's ===
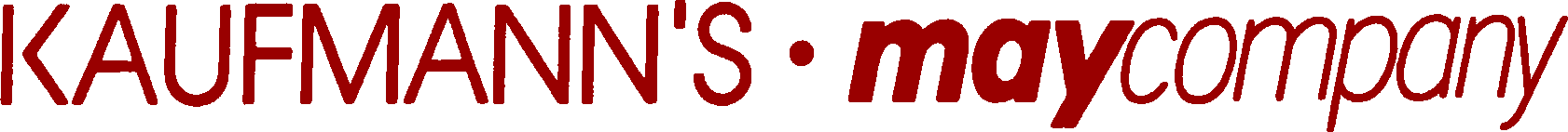
Kaufmann's-May Company transition logo

In 1989, May Company Cleveland, and O'Neil's, based in Akron, were merged to form May Company Ohio, as the May Department Stores began consolidating its regional department store divisions. On January 31, 1993, May Company Ohio was merged into Kaufmann's of Pittsburgh, and its Downtown Cleveland store was closed. Many of its former locations became Macy's in 2006.

== May Company Cleveland building ==
- May Company
- U.S. National Register of Historic Places
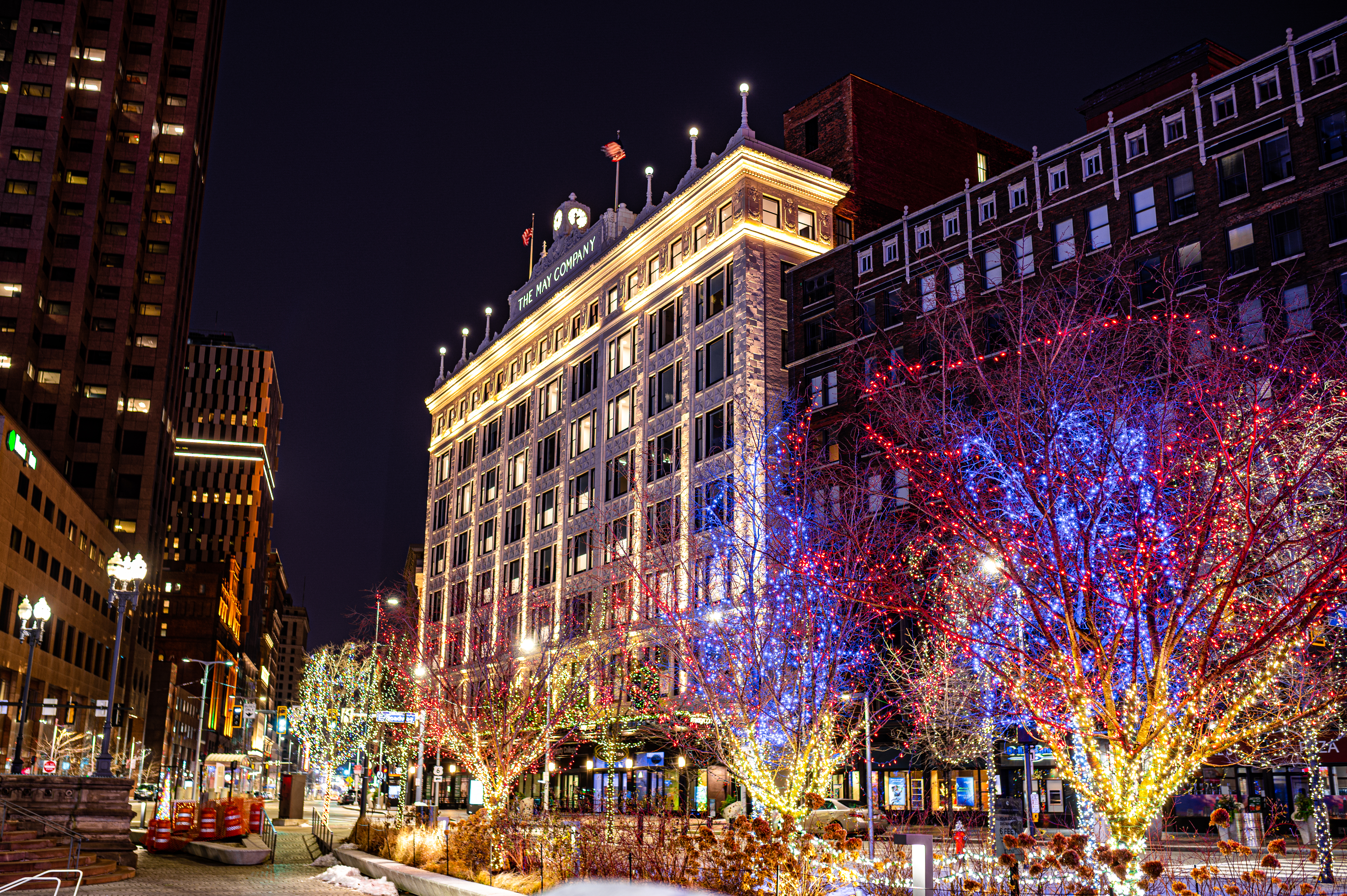
- Front of the building at night

- Location within Ohio Location within the United States
- Location: 158 Euclid Ave. at Public Sq., Cleveland, Ohio
- Coordinates: 41°29′55″N 81°41′31″W
- Area: 1.8 acres (0.73 ha)
- Built: 1914
- Architect: D.H. Burnham & Co.; Graham, Anderson, Probst & White
- Architectural style: Chicago
- NRHP reference No.: 74001443
- Added to NRHP: January 18, 1974

May's Cleveland headquarters building was listed on the National Register of Historic Places in 1974.

In late 2013, it was announced that the May Co building was set to potentially house over 350 apartments.

Bedrock-Detroit, a real estate company co-founded by Dan Gilbert, bought the May Company Building on Public Square in 2017 for $12 million (~$15.1 million in 2024) and now has plans to convert it to 308 apartments, almost 600 interior parking spaces, retail stores and rooftops for entertainment and green areas for residents' use. The opening date for the $140M (~$167 million in 2024) renovation was expected to be in June 2020, but construction has been delayed due to the COVID-19 pandemic.

=== Redevelopment ===
Bedrock, a real estate company co-founded by Dan Gilbert, purchased the May Company Building on Public Square in 2017 for $12 million, launching a three-year plan to renovate the space. Construction work began with Bedrock’s $180 million plan to convert the structure to 307 apartments, over 540 [BL3] interior parking spaces, retail, and amenities. Renamed The May, its grand reopening occurred in late 2020.

With nearly 80,000 square feet of commercial space including a 12,000 square-foot roof terrace, The May was updated and reconceptualized: restoring the original frosted windows, exterior terra cotta elements, interior column capitals, and the original May Company pediment clock. A new open-air atrium, fitness center, and rooftop views, have enabled the conversion to new uses.

This restoration work upgraded many features but sought to maintain the 20th-century nostalgia inherent in rediscovering The May’s roots as a historic department store while integrating modern features to suit the needs of tenants and visitors in the 21st century.

Since March 2020, The May has become a mixed-use space with a variety of offerings. Today, The May consists of 570-square-foot studio apartments and up to 1,413 square feet three-bedroom apartments. Ground floor retailers include Cuyahoga Community College, and other retail options. The property also boasts luxury-style accommodations, indoor parking, and access to downtown Cleveland, serving as a gateway to a host of activities in and around the area.

== See also ==
- List of defunct department stores of the United States
- List of department stores converted to Macy's
