= Higbee's =

Defunct Cleveland, OH department store

The E.C. Higbee Company
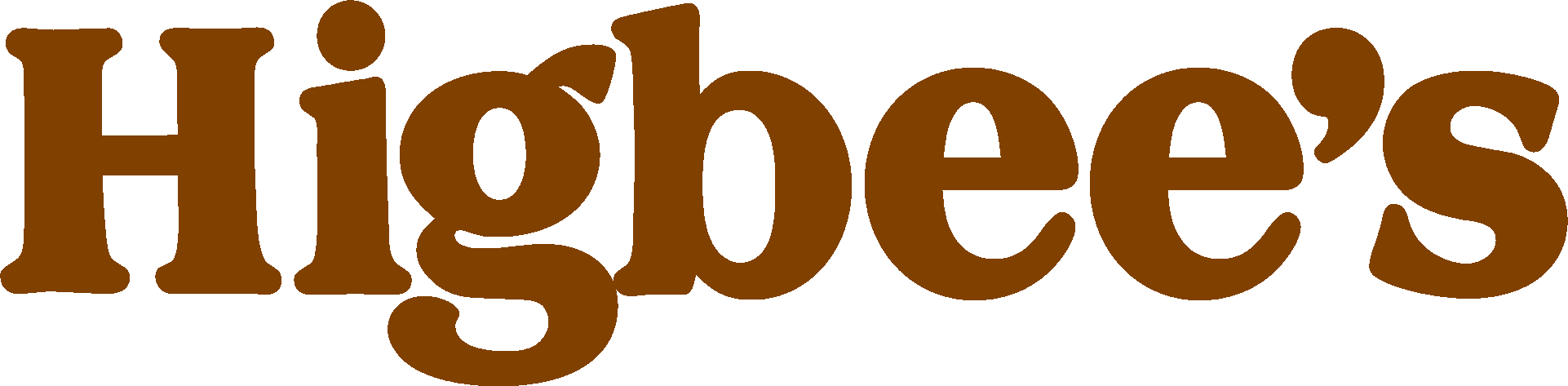

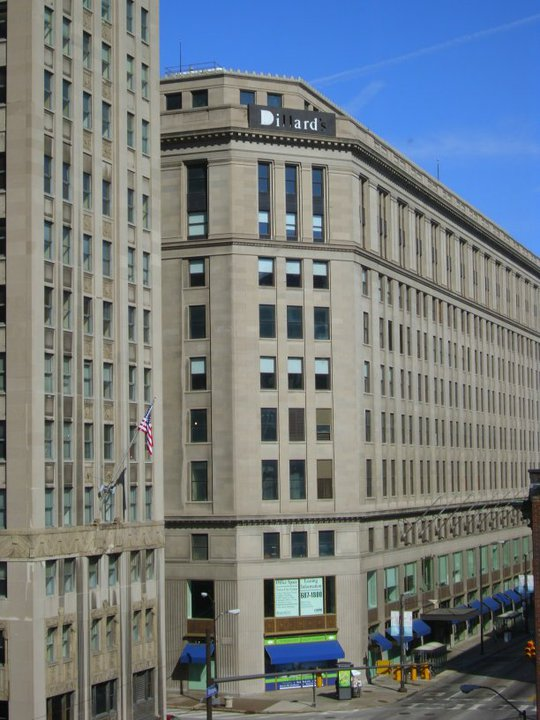
- The Higbee Building now houses the Jack Cleveland Casino
- Company type: Department store
- Industry: Retail
- Founded: 1860
- Defunct: 1992
- Fate: Converted to Dillard's
- Headquarters: Cleveland, Ohio
- Products: Clothing, footwear, bedding, furniture, jewelry, beauty products, and housewares.

Higbee's was a department store founded in 1860 in Cleveland, Ohio. In 1987, Higbee's was sold to the joint partnership of Dillard's department stores and Youngstown-based developer, Edward J. DeBartolo. The stores continued to operate under the Higbee name until 1992, when DeBartolo sold his shares to his partners and the chain was re-branded as Dillard's.

== History ==
Higbee's was founded by Edwin Converse Higbee and John G. Hower on September 10, 1860, as Higbee & Hower Dry Goods. The first day of business saw $100 in sales. It was reorganized as The Higbee Co. in 1902 after the death of Mr. Hower and relocated from its original Public Square location to a new five-story Playhouse Square Center store, directly across from its sworn arch-rival Halle Brothers Co. In 1929 it was acquired by the Van Sweringen brothers, who moved the store to their new $179 million Terminal Tower complex on Public Square, partly in response to pleas from women who wished to occupy homes in their new suburb of Shaker Heights and ride the Vans' new railroads into the city for quality shopping. The store subsequently went bankrupt in 1935 as the Van Sweringen empire collapsed in the Great Depression, but thanks to store executives Charles P. Bradley and John Murphy, the company was reorganized and flourished under their guidance for many years.

The 1960s and 1970s saw the addition of several stores in suburbs as well as expansion to Akron and Canton, all under the watch of president Herbert Strawbridge, who also saw the value of giving new life to The Flats district in Downtown Cleveland.

In 1984, Industrial Equity, a subsidiary of Brierly Investments, acquired Higbee's, selling it three years later to a joint venture of Dillard's and Edward J. DeBartolo Sr. who planned to combine Higbee's with an intended acquisition of Horne's. The deal was cancelled abruptly, resulting in several years of litigation. In 1992 Dillard's bought out DeBartolo's shares and rebadged Higbee's and five of the Northern Ohio Horne's stores with its name. During the 1990s, several inner-ring stores were closed while new far-flung locations opened or expanded.

The 192-foot-tall, 11-story Public Square flagship store was famous for its tenth-floor Silver Grille restaurant. It closed in January 2002. The Main Floor, second and third floors were restored in 2007 to house the new offices of the Convention & Visitors Bureau of Greater Cleveland and the Greater Cleveland Partnership, while the Silver Grille was restored for special events.

The building was again completely remodeled in 2011 and opened on May 14, 2012 as the Horseshoe Casino Cleveland. The building was again renamed, becoming the Jack Cleveland Casino and reopening on May 11, 2016 after Rock Gaming LLC took over management.

== In popular culture ==
- The store on Public Square was prominently featured in the 1983 movie A Christmas Story and in the 2022 movie A Christmas Story Christmas.
- Higbee's was referenced in Season 7 Episode 12 of Mad Men.
- Higbee's was referenced in Season 1 Episode 20 of 30 Rock.
