= HealthLine =

Bus rapid transit line in Cleveland, Ohio

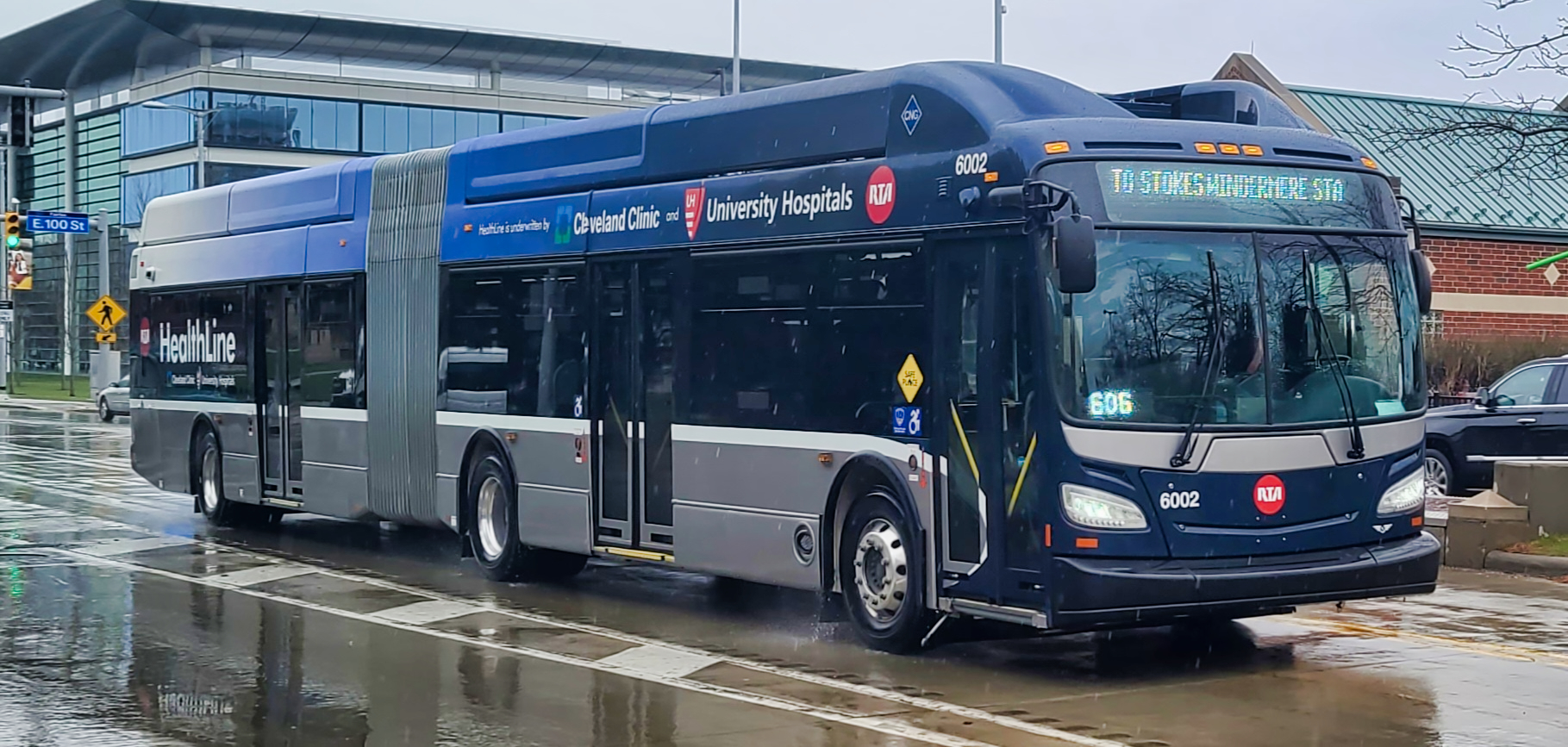
- A HealthLine bus passes the Cleveland Clinic Lerner College of Medicine

Overview
- Operator: GCRTA
- Garage: Hayden
- Vehicle: New Flyer Xcelsior XN60
- Status: Operational
- Began service: October 24, 2008

Route
- Route type: Bus rapid transit
- Locale: Cleveland and East Cleveland, Cuyahoga County, Ohio
- Start: Public Square
- End: Louis Stokes Station at Windermere
- Length: 6.8 mi (11 km)
- Stations: 59

Service
- Operates: 24 hours
- Ridership: 2,080,030 (2024)

The HealthLine, formerly known as the Silver Line, or as the Euclid Corridor Transportation Project, is a bus rapid transit (BRT) line run by the Greater Cleveland Regional Transit Authority in Cleveland and East Cleveland, Ohio, United States. The line runs along Euclid Avenue from Public Square in downtown Cleveland to the Louis Stokes Station at Windermere in East Cleveland. It began operation on October 24, 2008. Its current name was the result of a naming rights deal with the Cleveland Clinic and University Hospitals of Cleveland. The HealthLine is denoted with a silver color and abbreviated simply as HL on most RTA publications.

The HealthLine's ridership peaked at 5.08 million rides in 2014, but has declined to 1.7 million rides in 2023 following the impacts of COVID-19. It is the busiest bus route in Cleveland.

The Healthline is tied with Connecticut Transit's CTfastrak and Muni's Van Ness Bus Rapid Transit as the second-top rated BRT system in the United States, each with a Silver rating according to the Institute for Transportation and Development Policy (ITDP) BRT Standard. Only ABQ RIDE's Albuquerque Rapid Transit (ART) has achieved the top rating of Gold.

== History ==
Going back to the 1950s, the city of Cleveland considered alternatives for rapid transit along Euclid Avenue between downtown and University Circle. In 1985, the city commissioned a study called the Dual Hub Corridor Alternatives Analysis/Draft Environmental Impact Statement. The study estimated the cost of a subway along this corridor to be $1 billion and an option that involved a light rail component at $750 million. A further study in 1993 examined additional alternatives, including a bus rapid transit plan, which ultimately was selected by the RTA in 1995. Upon adoption by the Northeast Ohio Areawide Coordinating Agency in December 1995, the name of the project was changed from the Dual Hub Corridor to the Euclid Corridor.

The plan included the Euclid Corridor busway, relocating five Red Line stations and right-of-way improvements on East 17th and East 18th Streets. At the time, the estimated cost of the project was $210 million with the federal government funding 80% of the cost. In 1996, the Federal Transit Administration provided $4.0 million in funds for initial engineering studies. The initial ridership projections were 29,500 boardings per day by 2025. In 1999, the plan was scaled back to include only the busway and a budget of $228.6 million was established with the city seeking a 59% federal government share, or $135.0 million. The final design was completed in 2002 and the project was funded in 2004, with completion in 2008. The total cost was $197.2 million, which accounted for some additional changes to the initial scope.

In 2008, the RTA secured a naming rights deal with the Cleveland Clinic and University Hospitals for $6.25 million over 25 years and the route was renamed the HealthLine.

== Route description ==
The HealthLine route travels 6.8 miles (11 km) along Euclid Avenue from Public Square in Downtown Cleveland to Louis Stokes Station at Windermere in East Cleveland. It passes through the neighborhoods of Downtown, Midtown, Fairfax, University Circle and the suburb of East Cleveland.

There are 59 stations along Euclid Avenue that serve the HealthLine. All stations are equipped with a fare card vending machine, 24-hour lighting and an emergency phone. An illuminated text display informs passengers of expected arrival times. Between Public Square and East 107th Street, all stations have raised platforms that align with the floor of the rapid transit vehicle, easing boarding and alighting.

Between Public Square and East 105th Street, Euclid Avenue has two "bus only" lanes close to the inner median which only allow HealthLine vehicles passage, reducing delays due to conflicts with general traffic during busy times. Complementing the HealthLine is a set of bike lanes on the outer edges of the stretch Euclid Avenue that connects Cleveland State University with Case Western Reserve University.

As late as July 2010, the trip from East Cleveland to downtown during rush hour was more than 40 minutes – longer than the planned 33 minutes. This was due to traffic light timing and the 25 mph speed limit along most of the route. The speed limit was raised to 35 mph for buses and traffic light timing was adjusted further to combat this issue.

Shortly after the line began service, signal priority was discontinued along portions of the line. The decision has been referred to as a form of BRT creep.

The HealthLine operates out of the Hayden Garage, located behind the Stokes-Windermere station.

== Bus fleet ==
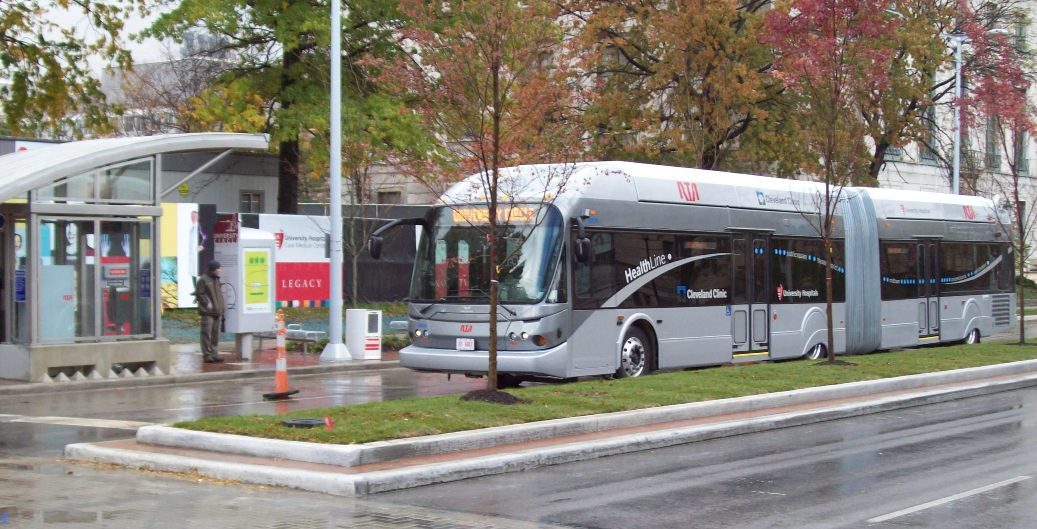
A HealthLine bus at the Adelbert Road bus stop

The HealthLine's original fleet consists of 21 articulated New Flyer DE60LFA vehicles, each with a seating capacity of 47 and able to accommodate 53 more standing up. The vehicles have two doors on each side and run on a diesel-electric hybrid motor system, producing 90% fewer carbon emissions than conventional diesel buses; a Caterpillar C9 low-sulfur diesel engine generates electrical power to run smaller electric motors mounted on each of the wheels. Each vehicle also has a GPS locator on board, which allowed automated traffic signals to give the HealthLine buses priority at busy intersections, until the feature was discontinued.

Sixteen CNG-powered New Flyer Xcelsior buses were added to the HealthLine fleet in 2021, commencing service in January 2022.

== Bus stops ==
The RTA classifies its bus rapid transit stops as "curb stations" and "median stations". Median stations are located within the Euclid Avenue busway and can only be accessed using crosswalks. Median stations can utilize left- or right-side boarding, as buses have doors on both sides. Curb stations are more traditional bus stops where buses open their doors to the right curb of the street.

== Schedule ==
On weekdays, the HealthLine runs every 7–10 minutes from 6:10 am to 7:10 pm, and every 15–30 minutes outside that window. On weekends and holidays, it runs every 15 minutes from 4:40 am to 11:40 pm and every 30 minutes outside that window.

== Stations ==
All stations are ADA-accessible

Station	Platform style	Doors opened	Location	Connections / Notes
Public Square/West Roadway	curb	left	Downtown	RTA Bus: 1, 3, 8, 9, 11, 14, 14A, 15, 19, 19A, 19B, 22, 25, 26, 26A, 39, 45, 51, 51A, 53, 53A, 55, 55B, 55C, 71, 77, 90, 251 eastbound stop
Public Square/Tower City	curb	left	Downtown	RTA Rapid Transit: Red Line, Blue Line, Green Line, Waterfront Line at Tower City station RTA Bus: 1, 3, 8, 9, 11, 14, 14A, 15, 19, 19A, 19B, 22, 25, 26, 26A, 39, 45, 51, 51A, 53, 53A, 55, 55B, 55C, 71, 77, 90, 251; Laketran: 10, 11, 12; METRO RTA: 61; PARTA: 100; SARTA: 4 eastbound stop
East 2nd Street	median	left	Downtown	
East 6th Street	median	left	Downtown	
East 9th Street	median	left	Downtown	
East 14th Street	median	left	Downtown	
East 19th Street	2 median	right	Downtown	METRO RTA: 61
East 24th Street	2 median	right	Downtown	
East 30th Street	2 median	right	Central	
East 36th Street	2 median	right	Central	
East 40th Street	2 median	right	Central	
East 51st Street	2 median	right	Central	
East 59th Street	2 median	right	Central	RTA Bus: 16
East 66th Street	2 median	right	Central	
East 71st Street	2 median	right	Central	
East 79th Street	2 median	right	Fairfax	RTA Bus: 2
East 83rd Street	2 median	right	Fairfax	
East 89th Street	2 median	right	Fairfax	
East 93rd Street	2 median	right	Fairfax	RTA Bus: 48, 50
East 100th Street	2 median	right	Fairfax	Sunday service only METRO RTA: 61 (weekdays only)
East 105th Street	2 median	right	University Circle	RTA Bus: 10, 11; Easternmost stop on exclusive BRT right-of-way
Stokes/Stearns	2 curb	right	University Circle	RTA Bus: 9, 11, 50
Adelbert Road	2 curb	right	University Circle	RTA Bus: 9
Cornell Road	2 curb	right	University Circle	RTA Bus: 9
East 115th Street	2 curb	right	University Circle	
East 118th Street	2 curb	right	University Circle	
East 123rd Street	2 curb	right	University Circle	
Lakeview Road	2 curb	right	East Cleveland	
Delmont Avenue	curb	right	East Cleveland	Westbound stop
Roxbury Road	curb	right	East Cleveland	Eastbound stop
Emily Street	curb	right	East Cleveland	Westbound stop
Garfield Road	curb	right	East Cleveland	Eastbound stop
Superior Avenue	2 curb	right	East Cleveland	RTA Rapid Transit: Red Line at Superior station RTA Bus: 3, 40
Eddy Road	curb	right	East Cleveland	Westbound stop
Wellesley Avenue	curb	right	East Cleveland	Eastbound stop
Lakefront Road	curb	right	East Cleveland	Westbound stop
Belmore Avenue	curb	right	East Cleveland	Eastbound stop
Debra Ann Lane	curb	right	East Cleveland	Westbound stop
Louis Stokes–Windermere		right	East Cleveland	RTA Rapid Transit: Red Line (direct connection); RTA Bus: 3, 7, 7A, 28, 28A, 31, 35, 37, 41, 41F

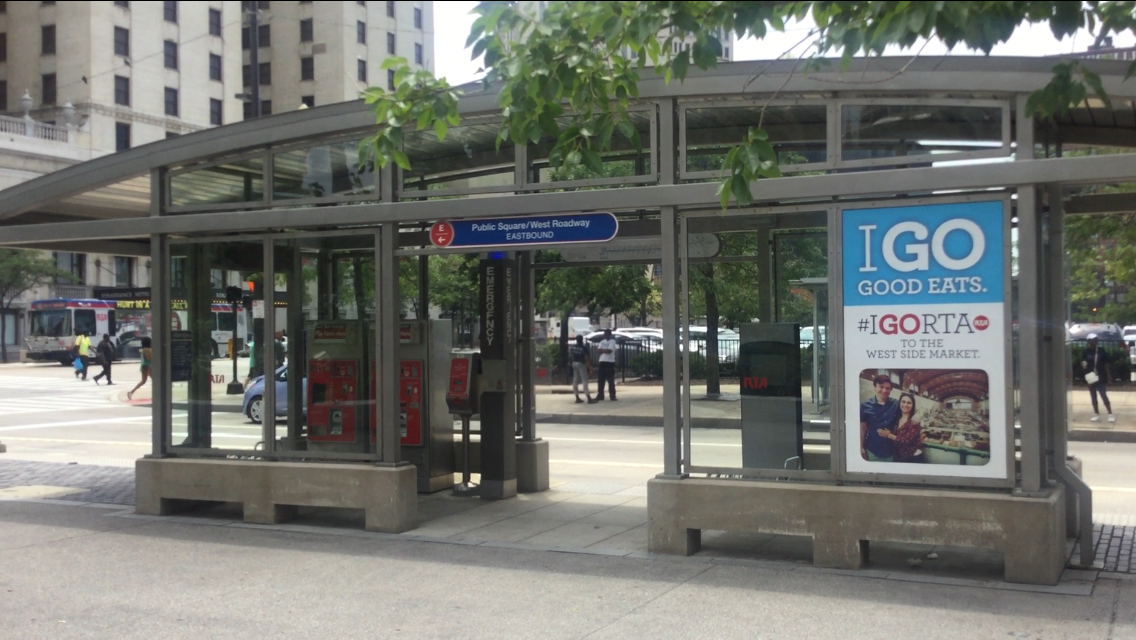
Public Square/West Roadway

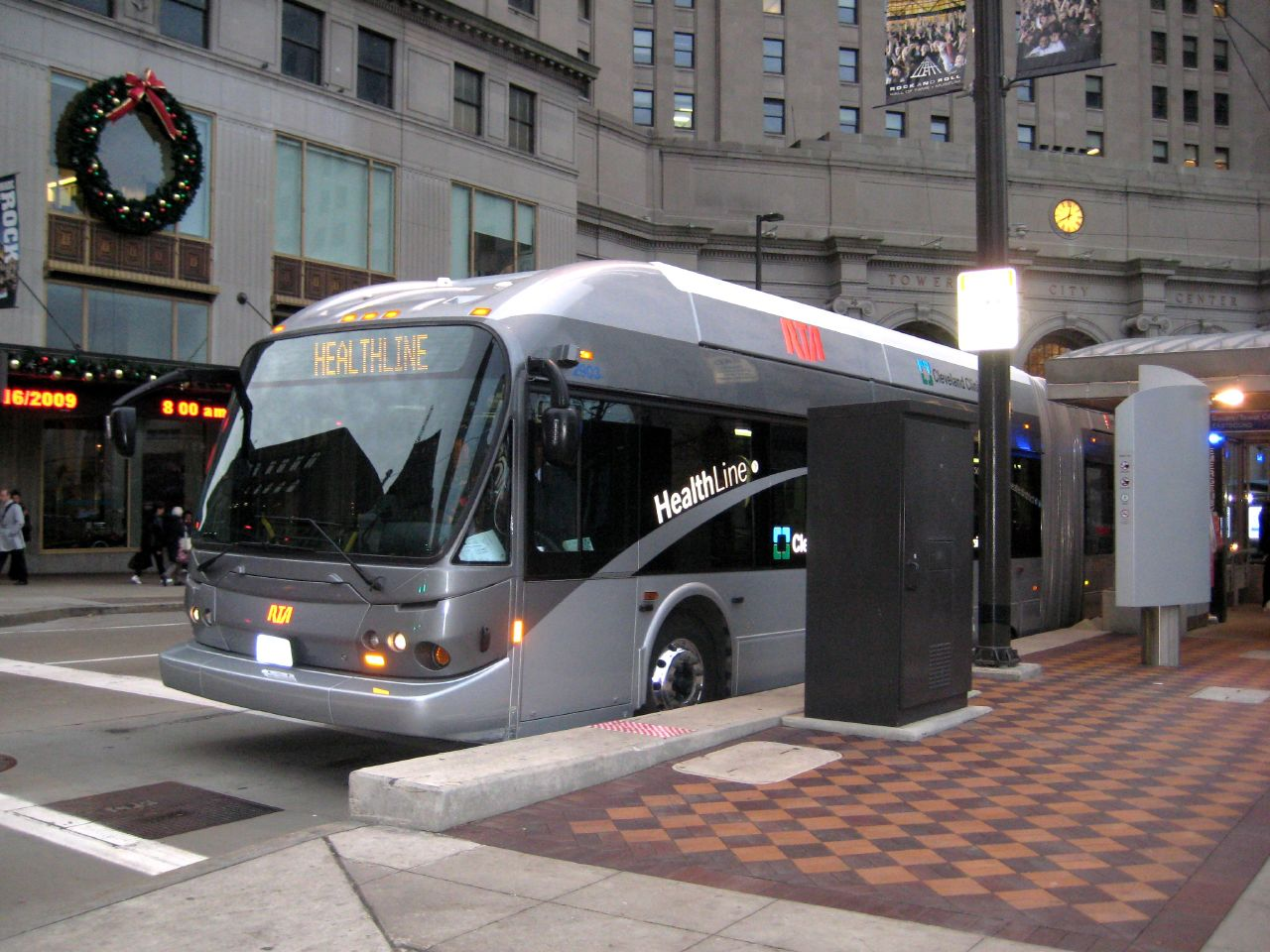
Public Square/Tower City

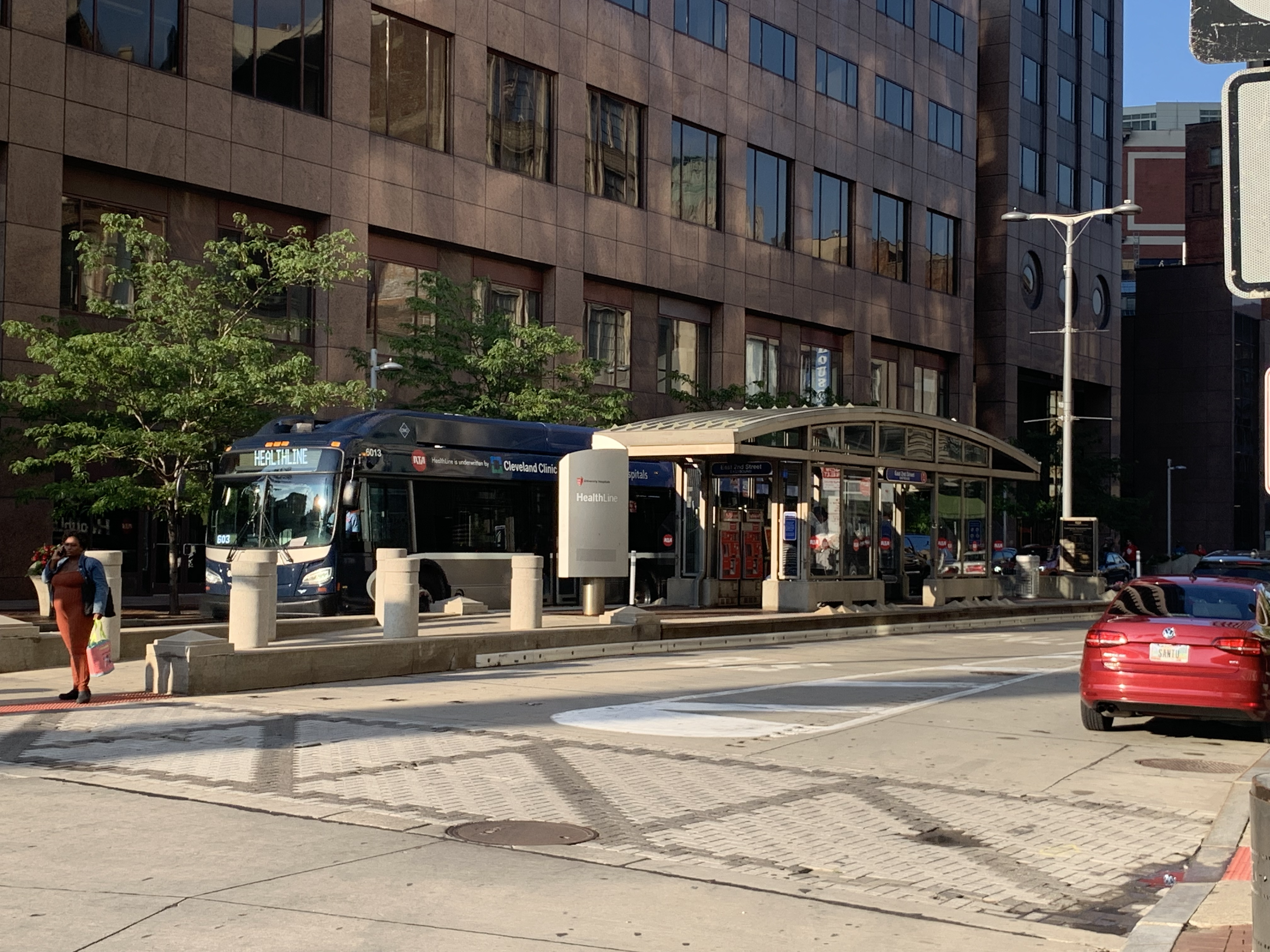
East 2nd Street

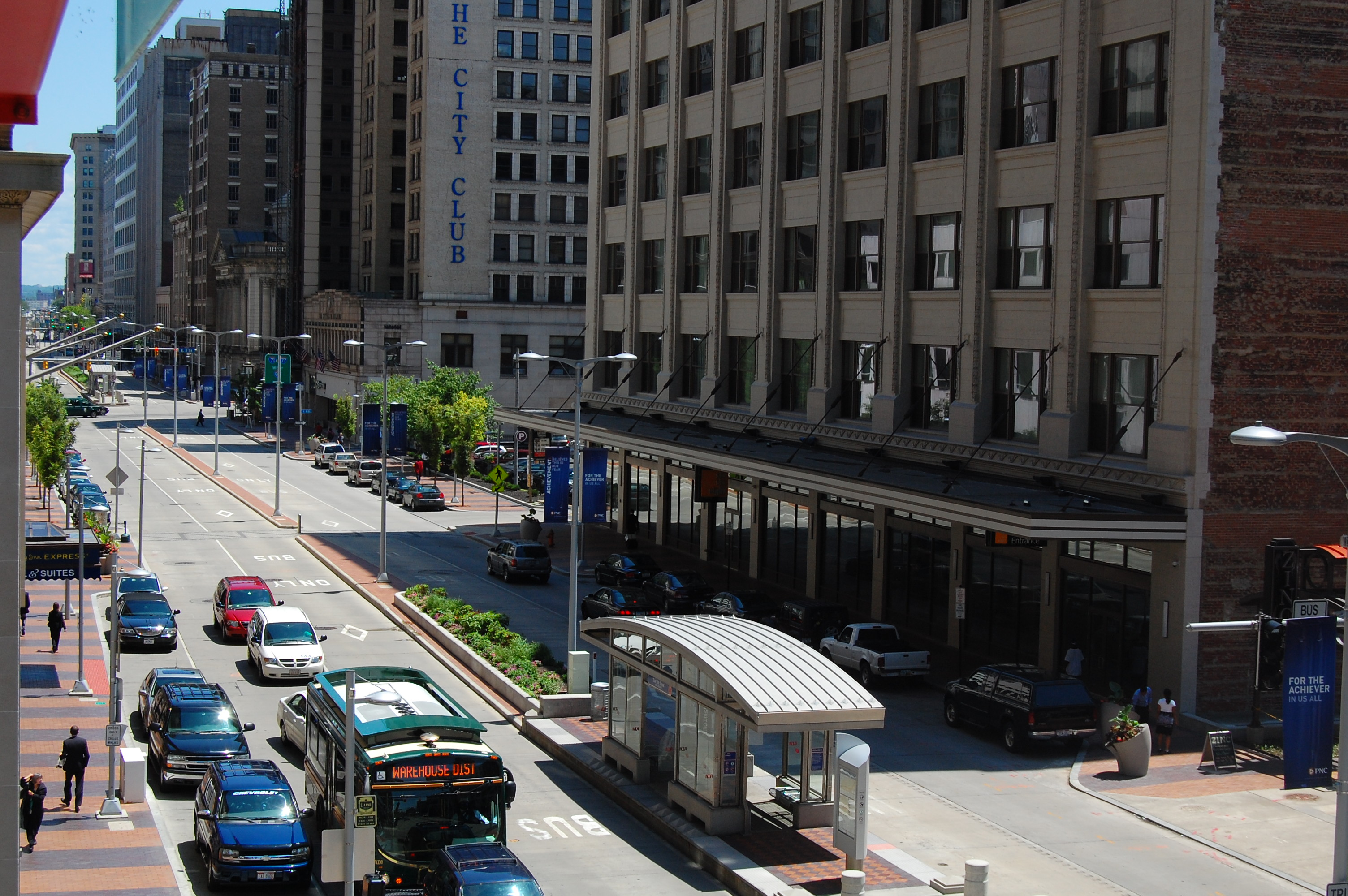
East 6th Street

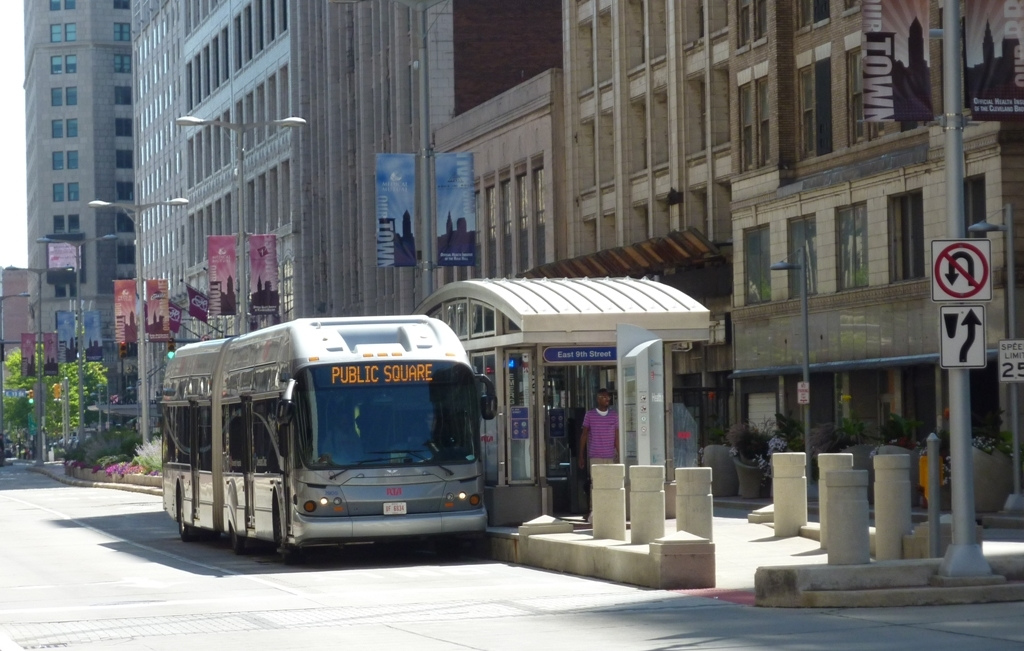
East 9th Street

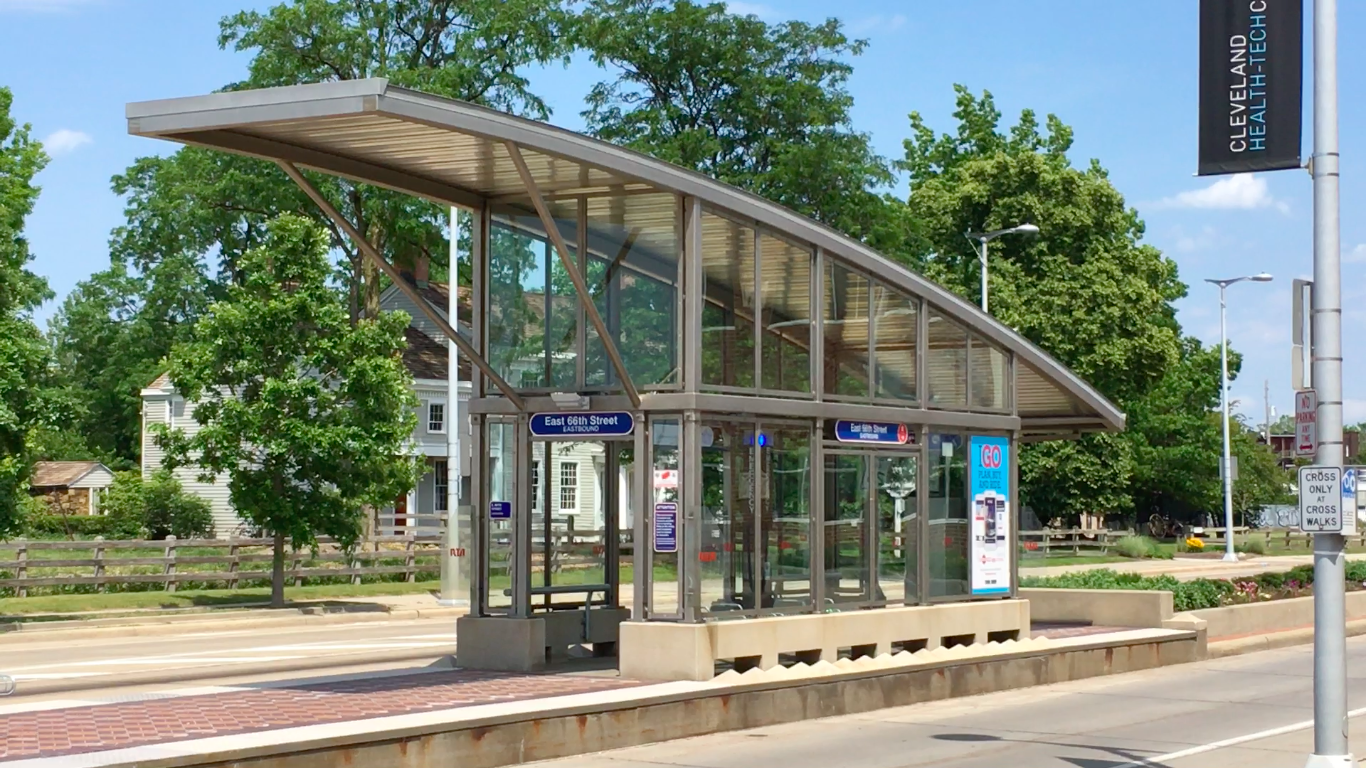
East 66th Street

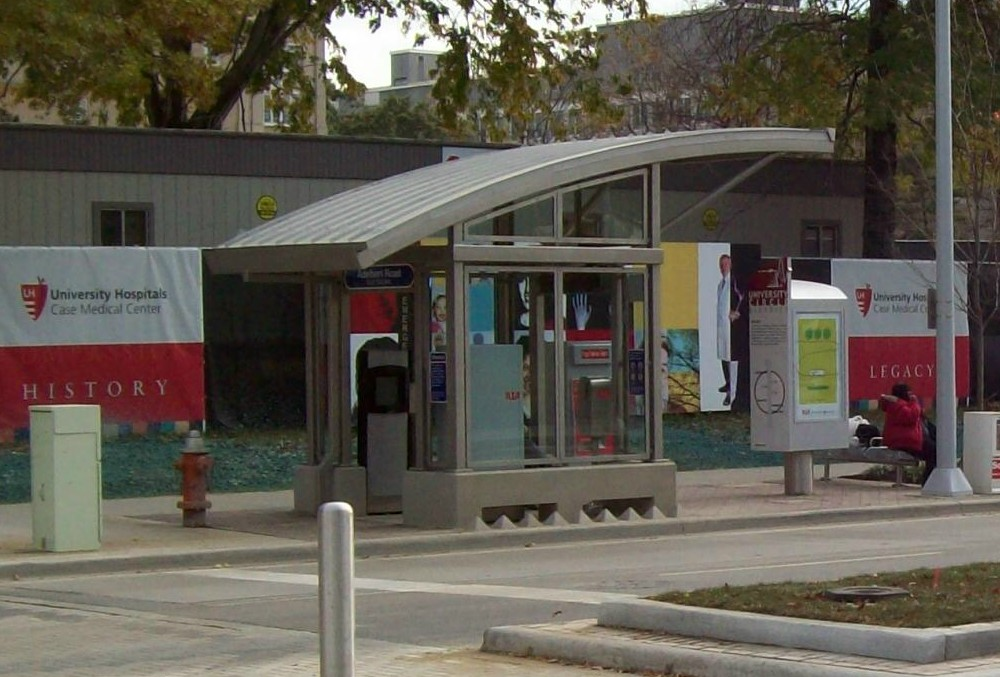
Adelbert Road

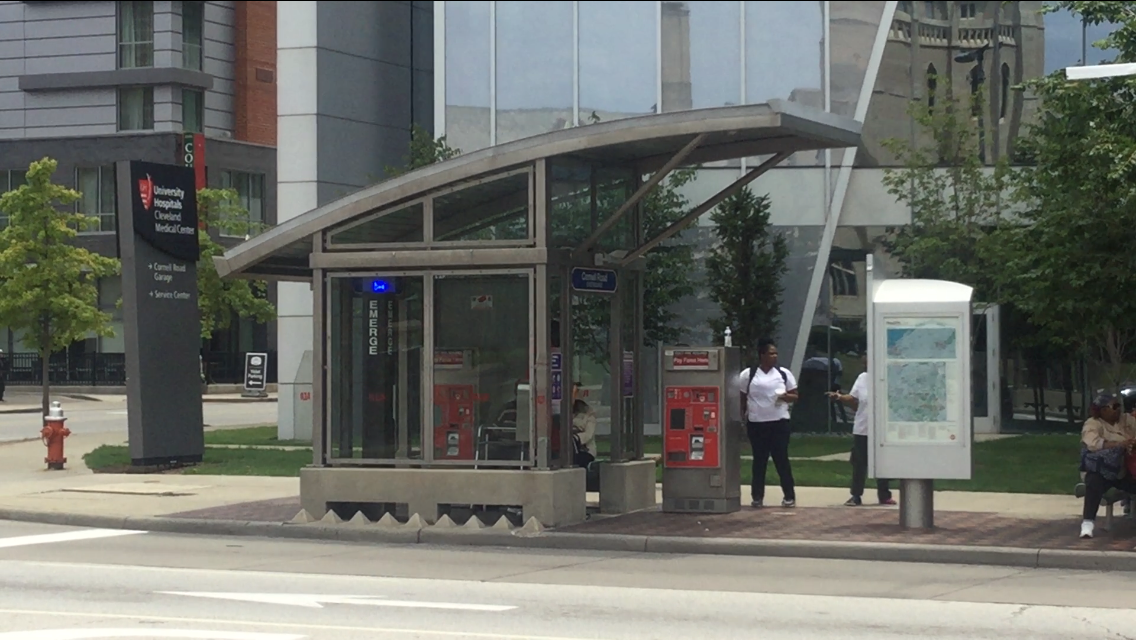
Cornell Road

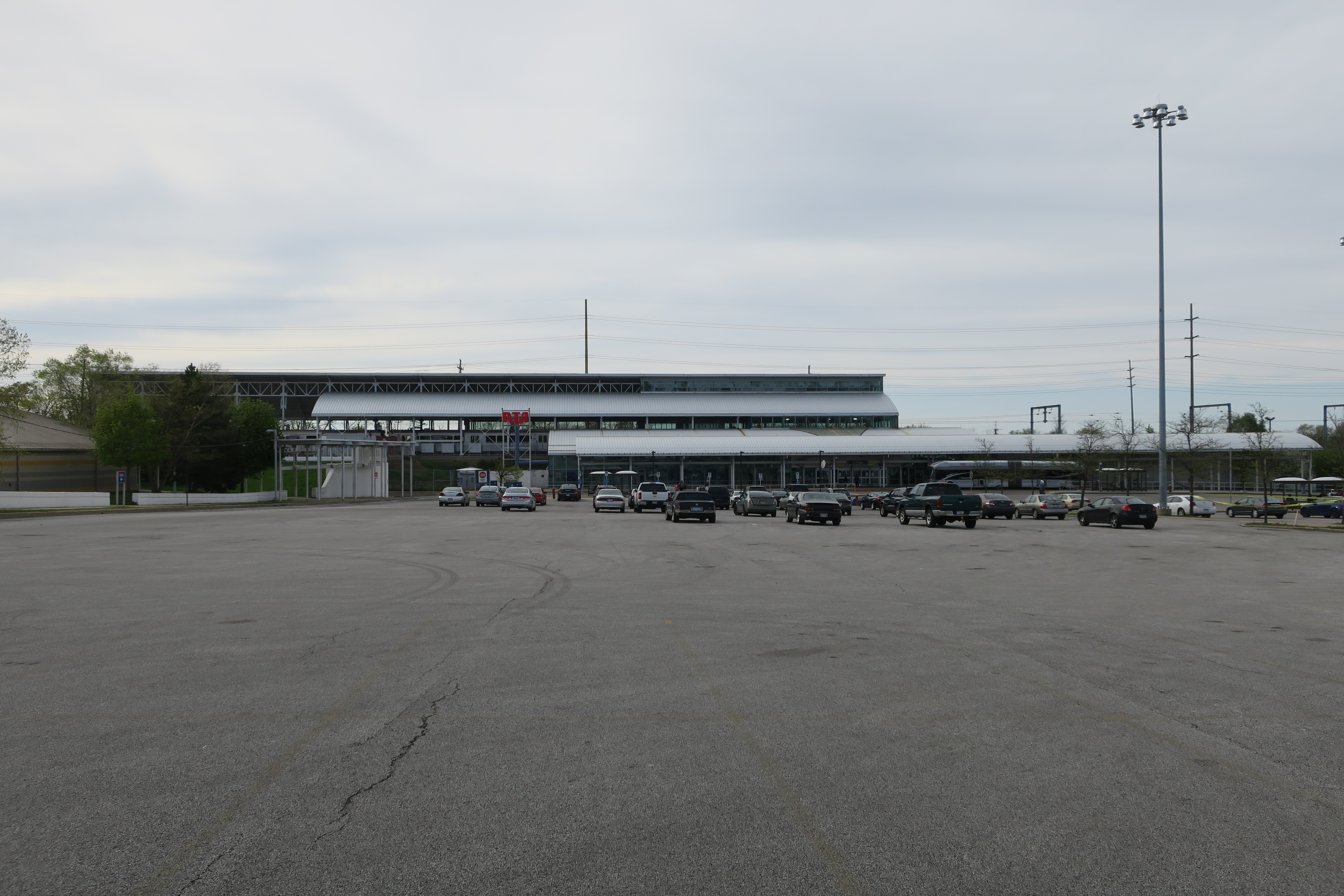
Louis Stokes Station at Windermere

== See also ==
- RTA Rapid Transit
- List of bus rapid transit systems
