= Whirling Udumbara II =

Musical work

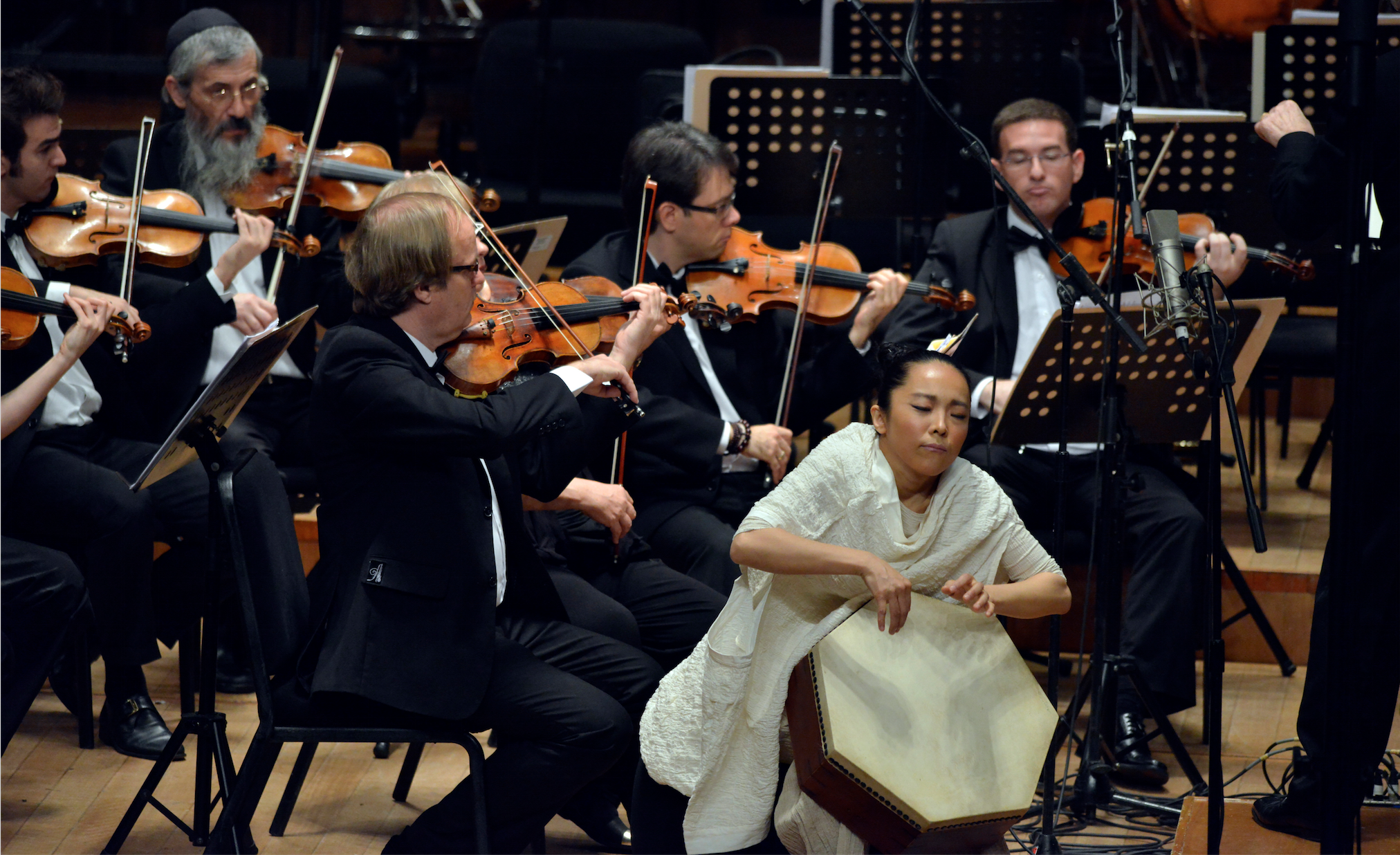
He Xuntian: Whirling Udumbara II He-drum Percussionist Ehesuma and The Israel Symphony Orchestra

Whirling Udumbara II ( 优昙波罗旋转舞 II ) is a work for He-drum and string orchestra, composed by He Xuntian in 2012.

== Summary ==
Whirling Udumbara II (2012) was written especially for string orchestra and He-drum. He-drum was created and designed by Mr. He. The distinctive sound and the performance method of He-drum make a deep impression. The Soloist of this Works is the first worldwide He-drum performer Ehesuma.

== Inspiration ==
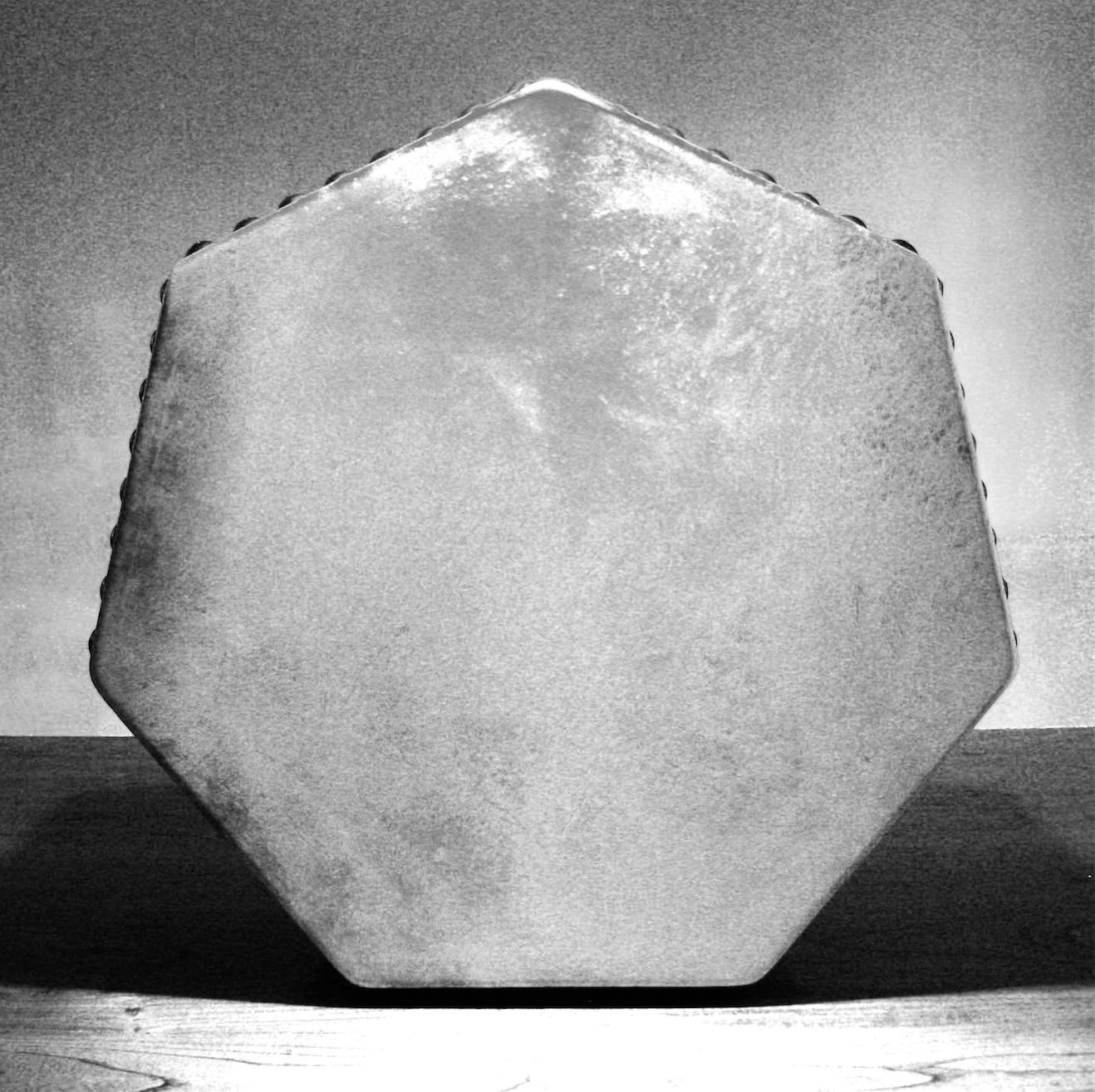
He-drum

Whirling Udumbara II was inspired from Xuntian He's poem Fragrant Nirvana Tree (1999).

== First performance ==
8. November 2014 Shanghai, Concert Hall, Oriental Art Center (CN)
He-drum: Ehesuma
Dirigent: James Judd
Israel Symphony Orchestra
