= He-drum =

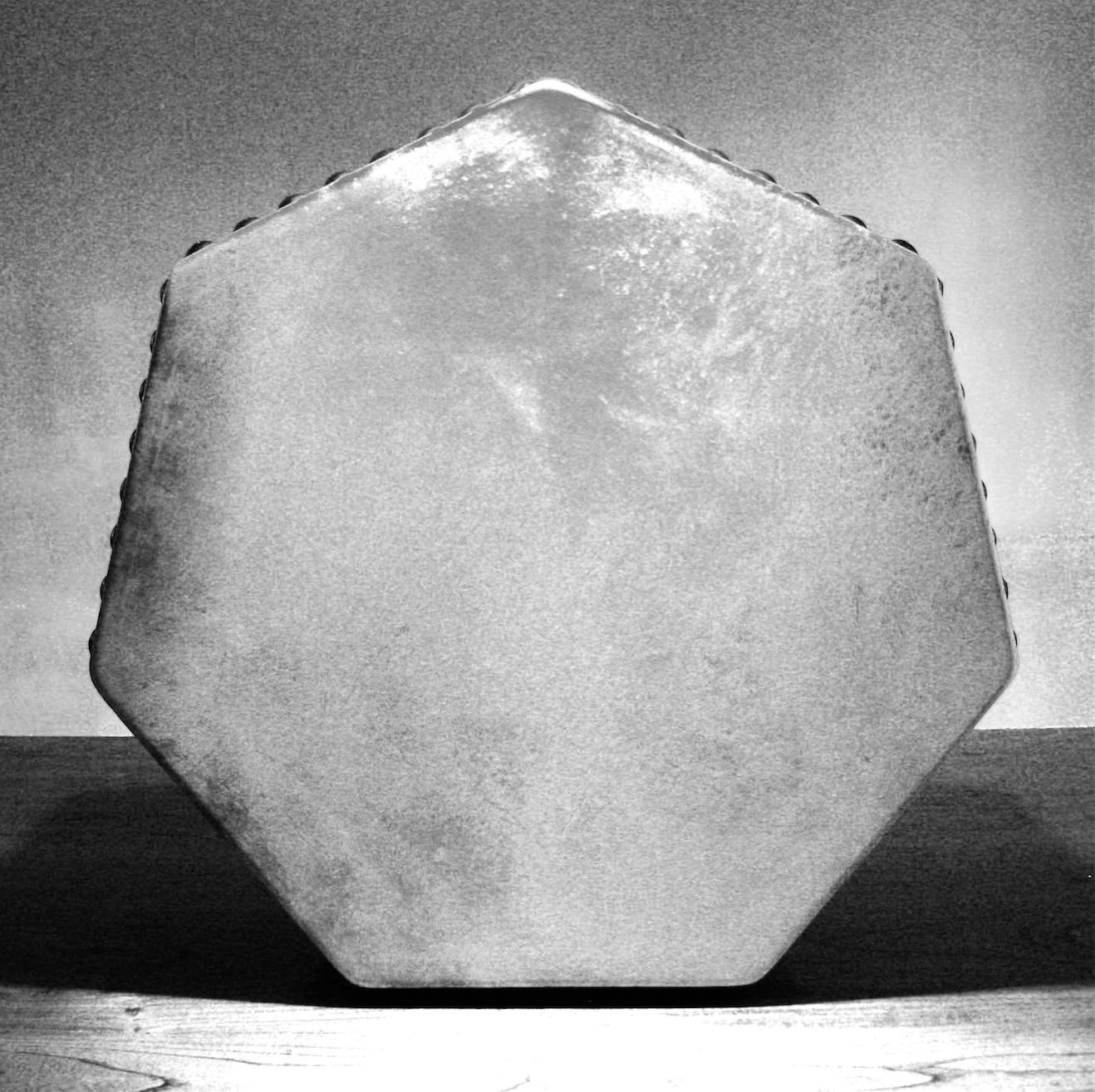
He-drum

He-drum (何鼓) is a membranophone instrument designed by He Xuntian. The instrument is single headed of cow skin, with a septangle shape.

== Performance ==
Composer He Xuntian, in Sunyata Dance for clarinet and orchestra, and Whirling Udumbara II for He-drum and string orchestra both written, was probably the first significant composer to use the instrument.
The performances of Amrta Song series III in Shanghai World Music Week in 2011, Dance in Meditation series IV in 2012, and Amrta on Water series V, the first music scene on Huangpu River in 2013, were introduced He-drum.
Ehesuma was the first He-drum soloist to use the instrument. She performed with the Israel Symphony Orchestra in Scent Dance He Xuntian Works Concert in 2014.

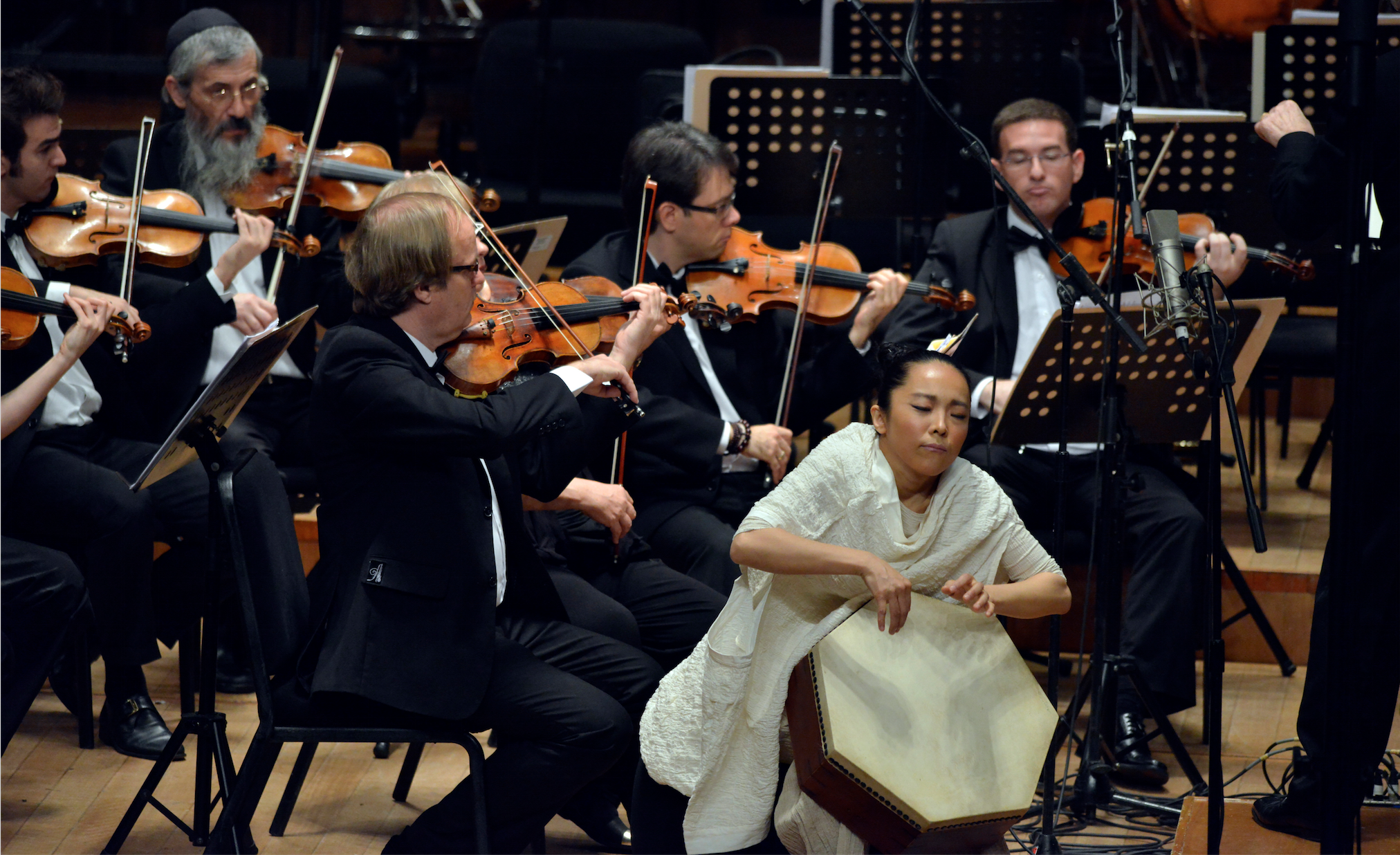
He Xuntian: Whirling Udumbara II He-drum Percussionist Ehesuma and The Israel Symphony Orchestra
