= Akron–Canton Airport =

Airport in Green, Ohio, United States

- IATA: CAK; ICAO: KCAK; FAA LID: CAK

Summary
- Airport type: Public
- Owner/Operator: Akron Canton Regional Airport Authority
- Serves: Akron, Canton, Cleveland and Massillon, Ohio
- Location: 5400 Lauby Rd NW, Green, Ohio U.S.
- Opened: March 9, 1948; 78 years ago
- Operating base for: Breeze Airways
- Elevation AMSL: 1,228 ft (374 m)
- Coordinates: 40°54.90′N 81°26.62′W
- Website: www.akroncantonairport.com

Maps
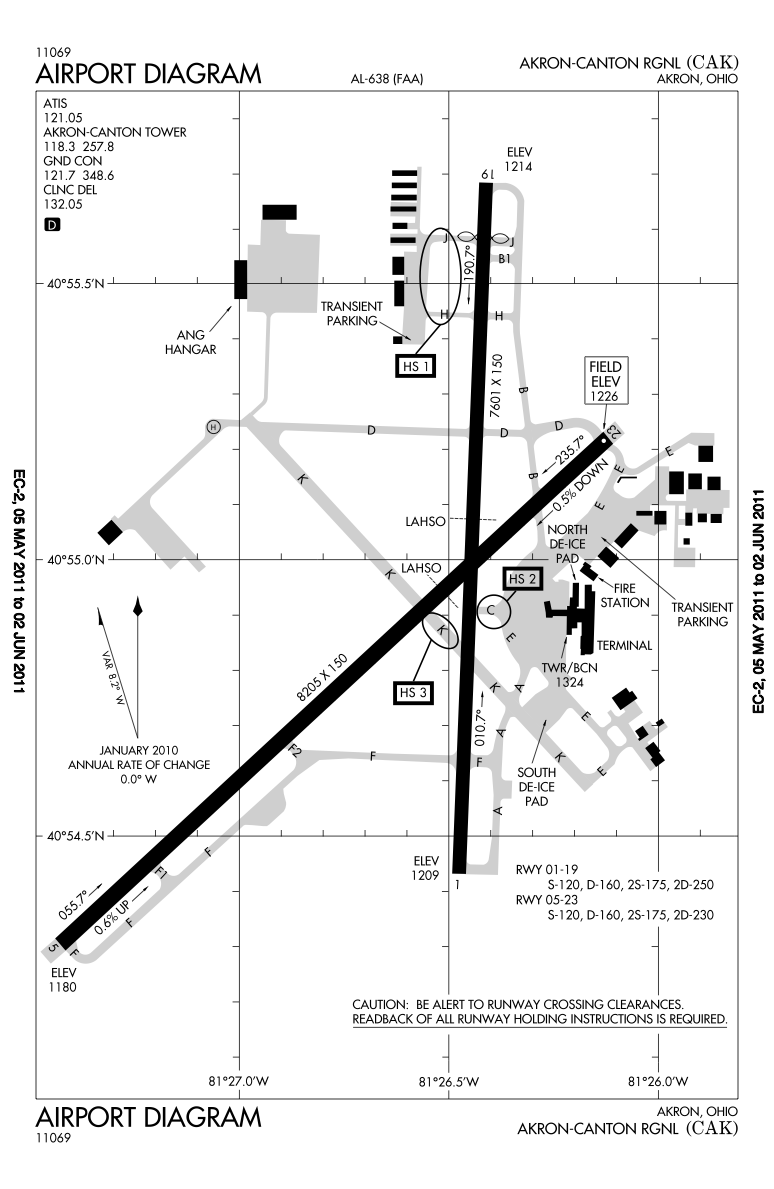
- FAA airport diagram
- Interactive map of Akron–Canton Airport

Runways
Direction	Length		Surface
Direction	ft	m	Surface
01/19	7,601	2,317	Asphalt
05/23	8,204	2,501	Asphalt

Statistics (2023)
- Total passengers (2025): 938,814 ▲23.54%
- Total cargo (tons-2022): 231,000
- Aircraft movements (2022): 48,472
- Based aircraft (2022): 153
- Sources: airport website and FAA

Akron–Canton Airport (IATA: CAK, ICAO: KCAK, FAA LID: CAK) is a commercial airport in the city of Green, in southern Summit County, Ohio (a small piece of each runway is in Stark County). The airport is located about 11 miles (18 km) southeast of Akron and 10 miles (16 km) northwest of Canton. It is jointly operated by Summit County and Stark County. The airport is a "reliever" airport for Northeast Ohio and markets itself as "A better way to go", emphasizing the ease of travel in comparison to Cleveland Hopkins International Airport. Just under 90% of its traffic is general aviation. It is included in the Federal Aviation Administration (FAA) National Plan of Integrated Airport Systems for 2019–2023, in which it is categorized as a small-hub primary commercial service facility.

Akron–Canton Airport covers 2,300 acres (9.3 km^{2}) and has two runways: 01/19 is 7,601 feet long and 05/23 is 8,204 feet long.

The airport has a maintenance base for PSA Airlines, a regional carrier owned by the American Airlines Group that flies under the American Eagle brand.

== History ==
Public funds for the construction of the airport were allocated during World War II for defense purposes, but construction stalled over a controversy relating to whether public funding of airport construction would be appropriate. As a result, private funding was essential to the initial construction of the airport, particularly in purchasing the land.

The Massillon Chamber of Commerce requested that the name Akron–Canton Memorial Airport be changed to Akron–Canton–Massillon Airport in June 1945. In September 1946, "Massillon" was again removed from the name, for it to become simply the Akron–Canton Airport.

The airport was dedicated on October 13, 1946, as the Akron–Canton Airport. Passenger air service began in 1948 when American, United, Capital, and Eastern airlines moved from the Akron Fulton International Airport.

A permanent terminal was built in 1955 and expanded in 1962. In the summer of 2020, a new expansion was made to the terminal, relocating gates from the original terminal to a new bi-level concourse. The original gates and terminal area from the 1960s are slated for demolition to make room for new aircraft parking areas.

In 2021, the airport received $7.7 million from the Federal Aviation Administration to acquire snow removal equipment, rehabilitate taxiways and aviation aprons, rehabilitate existing lighting systems, and perform sealing along sections of taxiway surface area.

=== Passenger growth and decline ===
During the mid-2000s, the airport was one of the fastest-growing airports in the Midwest, attracting passengers from the Akron/Canton area and Cleveland metropolitan area. The airport's passenger count doubled between 2000 and 2006, with several new routes added by AirTran Airways and Frontier Airlines. The airport experienced its busiest year in 2012, with 1.83 million passengers flying through.

Since 2012, passenger traffic has decreased. AirTran's presence at the airport shrank following the airline's acquisition by Southwest Airlines in 2011. Several other low-cost carriers, including JetBlue, Frontier Airlines, and Spirit Airlines, established new routes from nearby Cleveland Hopkins, lowering average airfares at that airport and reducing demand for Cleveland-based travelers to fly out of further-away Akron. In 2017, Southwest dropped Akron and consolidated operations at Cleveland Hopkins, as Allegiant Air did the same year.

By 2017, the airport's passenger traffic sank to its lowest level since 2004. As of May 2018, it had the second fastest declining passenger count of any US airport.

In the aftermath of the COVID-19 pandemic, the airport suffered further loss of service, as Delta Air Lines ceased its long-running service from the airport to Atlanta in 2020, and Spirit Airlines ended all flights to Orlando and seasonal service to Myrtle Beach and Fort Myers in 2022. United Express dropped service to Washington–Dulles in 2022, citing ongoing staff shortages. This service had replaced their erstwhile service to Newark in 2021, although the airline hopes to restart scheduled flights to Dulles in 2023.

=== Expansion ===
In 2006, the airport completed a terminal expansion and renovation, including the addition of a new wing off the main concourse. It increased the number of gates from 9 to 11 and provides new baggage areas, a food court, and better aesthetics. The new wing opened to passengers in May 2006 and was home to AirTran Airways and its successor, Southwest.

In 2011, the expanded TSA screening area was completed. It has four lanes for screening, with the ability to open two more. Along with the expanded screening area, Advanced Imaging Devices were installed and a TSA Precheck lane was added.

The airport initiated CAK 2018, its 10-year, $110 million Capital Improvement Plan, in March 2008. The plan was the most ambitious capital improvement plan in Akron–Canton Airport's history and called for 10 projects in the next 10 years. One of those projects, a runway expansion, has already been completed: runway 05/23 was extended from 7,600 ft (2,300 m) to 8,200 ft (2,500 m). The runways now allow aircraft to fly non-stop to anywhere in the U.S. and throughout Mexico and Canada.

Other projects include expanding aircraft parking and general aviation area, replacing aircraft rescue and firefighting maintenance facility, a new customs and border patrol facility, expanding auto parking lots, a widened entrance road, expanded ticket wing and TSA screening area, and an expanded upper-level concourse. The construction of Port Green Industrial Park, on 213 acres (0.86 km^{2}), also began to be developed into 10-12 business sites.

In June 2021, Breeze Airways launched nonstop flights from Akron to Charleston (SC), New Orleans, and Tampa. They have since continued their expansion at the airport, adding scheduled service to Las Vegas, Nashville, and West Palm Beach. Following the withdrawal of Spirit Airlines at CAK, Breeze Airways also announced the commencement of service to Orlando beginning in March 2023.

In September 2021, Allegiant Air announced that they would be discontinuing service to Cleveland and returning to Akron–Canton, flying to four destinations with operations beginning March 2, 2022. Further expansions to Fort Lauderdale and Orlando-Sanford were announced in May 2022.

In February 2025, Breeze Airways announced that Akron–Canton Airport will be opening a new crew base, set to start in summer 2025.

== Airlines and destinations ==
=== Passenger ===
Airlines	Destinations	Refs
Allegiant Air	Destin/Fort Walton Beach, Fort Lauderdale, Jacksonville (FL), Orlando/Sanford, Punta Gorda (FL), Sarasota, Savannah, St. Petersburg/Clearwater; Seasonal: Myrtle Beach, Nashville	
American Eagle	Charlotte, Chicago–O'Hare, Washington–National	
Breeze Airways	Charleston (SC), Fort Lauderdale, Jacksonville (FL), Las Vegas, Orlando, Raleigh/Durham, Savannah, Tampa, Wilmington (NC); Seasonal: Daytona Beach, Fort Myers, Myrtle Beach, Norfolk, Portland (ME), Sarasota, West Palm Beach	
United Express	Chicago–O'Hare	

== Statistics ==
=== Top destinations ===
Busiest domestic routes from CAK (August 2025 – July 2026)
Rank	City	Passengers	Carriers
1	Chicago–O'Hare, Illinois	79,420	United, American
2	Charlotte, North Carolina	75,910	American
3	Orlando-International, Florida	44,260	Breeze
4	Sarasota, Florida	34,900	Allegiant, Breeze
5	Charleston, South Carolina	32,040	Breeze
6	Jacksonville, Florida	29,680	Allegiant, Breeze
7	Myrtle Beach, South Carolina	29,370	Allegiant, Breeze
8	Fort Myers, Florida	24,090	Breeze
9	Savannah, Georgia	23,590	Allegiant, Breeze
10	Punta Gorda, Florida	23,270	Allegiant

=== Airline market shares ===
Largest airlines at CAK (August 2025 – July 2026)
Rank	Airline	Passengers	Share
1	Breeze Airways	449,000	40.80%
2	Allegiant Air	323,000	29.35%
3	PSA Airlines	199,000	18.14%
4	SkyWest Airlines	114,000	10.34%
5	Envoy Air	14,880	1.35%
–	Other	130	0.01%

=== Annual traffic ===
Annual passenger traffic at CAK 2005–present
Year	Passengers	Year	Passengers	Year	Passengers
2005	1,301,000	2015	1,545,997	2025	938,814
2006	1,438,304	2016	1,398,615		
2007	1,391,836	2017	1,265,844		
2008	1,469,196	2018	920,002		
2009	1,444,269	2019	813,976		
2010	1,594,875	2020	291,657		
2011	1,664,387	2021	414,783		
2012	1,838,082	2022	534,257		
2013	1,724,676	2023	686,661		
2014	1,566,638	2024	759,545		

== Facilities and aircraft ==
The airport has two runways, both paved with asphalt. Runway 5/23 measures 8204 x 150 ft (2501 x 46 m), and runway 1/19 measures 7601 x 150 ft (2317 x 46 m). For the 12-month period ending December 31, 2021, the airport had 58,035 aircraft operations, an average of 159 per day. This was 52% general aviation, 34% air taxi, 12% commercial, and 3% military. For the same time period, 129 aircraft were based at the airport: 59 single-engine and 25 multi-engine airplanes, 30 jets, 12 military aircraft, and 3 helicopters.

== Ground transportation ==
Akron–Canton Airport has a number of taxicab and shuttle services.

It is also served by one route from each of the region's two public transit providers, Akron Metro Regional Transit route 110, and Canton-based Stark Area Regional Transit Authority (SARTA) route 81.

The SARTA route provides service every hour for most of the day Monday through Saturday and serves both Canton and Akron via Interstate 77, including transit centers in both downtown Canton and downtown Akron.

The Akron Metro route is a five-times-per-day Monday through Friday local route through Southern Summit County, but does serve the downtown Akron Transit Center.

== Accidents and incidents ==
- On November 4, 1949, a Harrington's Inc. DC-3, a cargo flight, crashed at CAK short of runway 36 in light snow and limited visibility, hitting trees and landing inverted east of the runway, killing all three occupants. This is the worst crash on airport property in its history.
- On November 27, 1973, Eastern Airlines Flight 300 was arriving from Pittsburgh International Airport when it ran off the end of the runway. The aircraft was a McDonnell Douglas DC-9-31 with five crew members and 21 passengers, and originated at Miami International Airport with a routing MIA-PIT-CAK. The weather conditions were low ceilings, light rain showers and fog. The National Transportation Safety Board (NTSB) determined that landing at excessive speed too far down the wet runway caused the aircraft to hydroplane and not be able to stop. It went over an embankment and was severely damaged and written off. There were no fatalities, but all 26 on board had various injuries.
- On August 2, 1979, a Cessna Citation 501 piloted by New York Yankees catcher Thurman Munson stalled and crashed 870 feet (270 m) short of runway 19, killing Munson. The two other people in the plane with him were able to escape the plane just as it caught fire.
- On December 26, 2002, a Cessna 172S was substantially damaged while landing at the Akron-Canton Regional Airport. The pilot reported he was landing with a 15 knot crosswind component. The airplane touched down hard and began to bounce. The airplane bounced five or six times before the pilot performed a go-around. During the second landing attempt, the pilot experienced difficulty manipulating the airplane's controls. The airplane landed hard, veered off the left side of the runway, and struck a snow bank. The probable cause of the accident was found to be the pilot's improper flare, which resulted in a hard landing.
- On July 12, 2003, a Piper PA-23 was destroyed shortly after takeoff from Akron-Canton Regional Airport. The aircraft was being flown to Medina Municipal Airport after an annual inspection. Almost immediately after rotation, the aircraft veered left due to a loss of left engine power. The pilot was unable to maintain directional control, and the aircraft contacted the ground with the left wing first, followed by the nose, and came to rest at the approach end of Runway 32. After the investigation, a representative of the salvage company who the aircraft was sold to said the left engine's main bearing was found partially seated on the journal. The probable cause of the accident was found to be the pilot's failure to maintain minimum control single engine airspeed (Vmc) during a loss of power on one engine, which resulted in a loss of control in flight an in-flight collision with terrain.
- On January 30, 2004, a Gates Learjet 35A was substantially damaged while taxiing at the Akron-Canton Regional Airport. According to the pilot, the taxi from the runway to the ramp area was normal. After making a right 90 degree turn onto the ramp from taxiway "E", the airplane began to slide on top of an ice layer. The brakes were ineffective and the co-pilot shut down the engines; however, due to the downward slope of the ramp area and the wind conditions, the airplane continued to accelerate. The airplane then struck a concrete retaining wall, before it came to rest. The probable cause of the accident was found to be improper ramp maintenance, resulting in a loss of airplane control while taxiing on ice, with contributing factors including high winds and the ramp's downward slope.
- On January 19, 2005, a Cessna 414 was substantially damaged during a hard landing at Akron-Canton Regional Airport. After departure from Akron Fulton Airport, the aircraft entered clouds and immediately picked up heavy ice, and the aircraft's deicing systems were activated, though they could not compete with the ice accumulation. The pilot attempted to land back at Fulton but could not because ice was clouding the front window and could not be removed. The pilot then proceeded to Akron-Canton for an Airport Surveillance Radar approach. When the pilot reduced power in the flare, the aircraft landed hard on all three landing gear wheels simultaneously. The probable cause of the incident was found to be the pilot's failure to obtain a complete weather briefing, which resulted in an inadequate weather decision, and flight into known icing conditions. A factor was the airplane not being equipped for flight in icing conditions.
- On November 14, 2006, a Mooney M20J impacted the runway during landing at the Akron-Canton Regional Airport. The pilot reported that the aircraft's flaps did not deploy symmetrically on final; though full flaps had been selected, the left flap did not fully deploy. The pilot attempted to raised the flaps, but they subsequently became jammed asymmetrically. As the pilot rounded out to flare, the left wing stalled and dropped sharply; the pilot attempted to add power to correct, but this caused the aircraft to enter a steep left turn due to the differences in the amount of lift each wing was producing. A post-accident examination confirmed flap system continuity. In addition, the flap actuator motor operated when electrical power was applied. Impact damage precluded an exact measurement of the flap deflections and rigging. The probable cause of the accident was found to be the pilot's failure to maintain sufficient airspeed during final approach, resulting in an inadvertent stall.
- On December 19, 2008, a Piper Saratoga impacted a flagpole and crashed into the lawn of a vacant house while attempting to land at Akron–Canton Airport, killing the pilot. The crash occurred about 2 miles east/northeast of the airport because of icing conditions, spatial disorientation, pilot error, and the pilot’s failure to initially intercept and establish the airplane on the proper approach course.
- On March 18, 2011, an Embraer 145 veered off of the left side of the runway while landing at the Akron-Canton Regional Airport. The crew reported to a Federal Aviation Administration inspector that the flight was uneventful until the nose landing gear touched down on the runway during landing. At that point, the airplane made an uncommanded left turn that the pilots were unable to correct. The airplane veered off the runway pavement before coming to a stop. The captain reported that the approach was normal and that there were no warnings or messages from the airplane's systems prior to touchdown. He said that, during the event, the first officer attempted to manually disengage nosewheel steering using the switch provided on his control wheel, but this action did not prevent the airplane from veering to the side. Postincident examination of the nosewheel steering system did not reveal any anomalies that would have precluded normal operation, and the cause of the accident was found to be the uncommanded left deflection of the airplane's nosewheel for reasons that could not be determined.
- On May 10, 2016, a Mooney Aircraft M20 was substantially damaged by a runway excursion during takeoff at the Akron-Canton Regional Airport. The pilot reported the aircraft veered left during the takeoff roll as the it accelerated to takeoff speed. The pilot reduced engine power and applied full right rudder, but the airplane exited the runway and struck airport lighting, where it sustained substantial wing and fuselage damage. It was found a bolt that attaches the nose landing gear retraction link to the nose gear truss assembly was missing from the nose wheel well; wheel steering and the brakes were found to be functioning properly. A representative of Mooney Aircraft Co did not believe the missing bolt would cause the nose wheel to castor into the wind on a takeoff roll, and he indicated that he did not believe it would allow the wheel to castor if the bolt fell out. Regardless, the probable cause of the accident was found to be the missing bolt in the nose landing gear assembly, which resulted in the airplane suddenly turning left and the pilot's inability to maintain directional control during a crosswind takeoff.

== See also ==
- List of airports in Ohio
