= METRO Regional Transit Authority =

Transit authority based in Akron, Ohio

METRO RTA

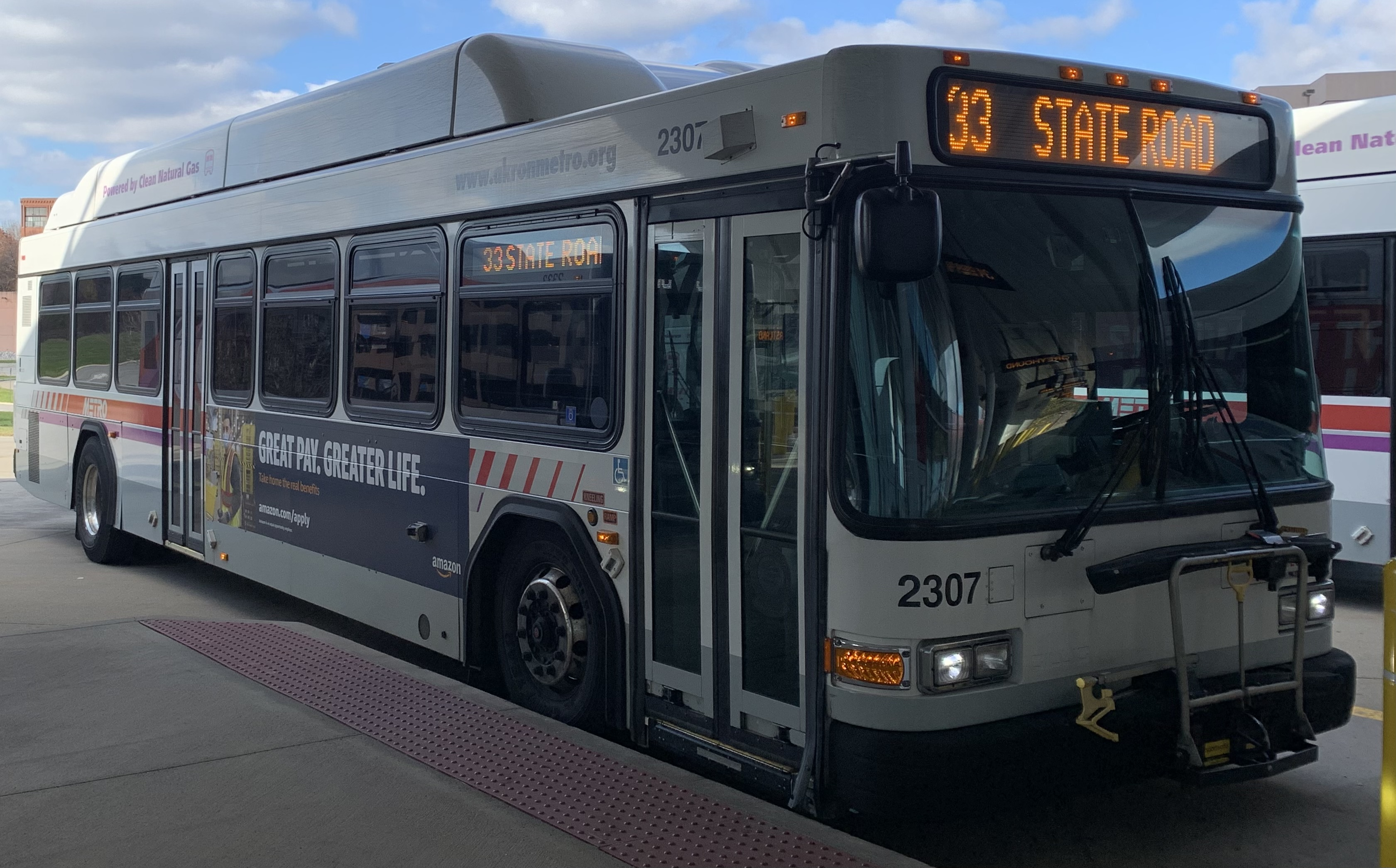
- Founded: 1969
- Headquarters: 416 Kenmore Blvd.
- Locale: Akron, Ohio
- Service area: Summit County, Ohio
- Service type: bus service, paratransit, express bus service
- Daily ridership: 19,000 (weekdays, Q2 2026)
- Annual ridership: 5,604,100 (2025)
- Fuel type: CNG
- Chief executive: Dawn Distler
- Website: www.yourmetrobus.org

METRO Regional Transit Authority (METRO RTA), also known as Akron Metropolitan Regional Transit Authority, is the public transit agency serving Summit County, Ohio and the city of Akron. It operates a number of local routes, and also operates one route into downtown Cleveland. Akron Metro transports passengers to/from school, work, grocery stores, malls and jobs all across Summit County. METRO RTA's fleet consists of about 200+ vehicles running on CNG and four fully electric vehicles. In 2025, the system had a ridership of 5,604,100, or about 19,000 per weekday as of the second quarter of 2026.

== History ==
Akron METRO was founded on August 1, 1969 following the closure of Akron Transportation Company four months prior.

In 2023, METRO RTA restructured their bus network to prioritize frequent routes with service every 15 minutes and added more weekend service. By the following year, ridership had increased 24 percent. The American Public Transportation Association awarded METRO RTA an Outstanding Public Transportation System Award in 2025.

METRO Regional Transit Authority previous logo style

== Services ==
=== METRO Direct ===
METRO RTA operates traditional fixed-route bus service in Summit County. As of 2023, the METRO Direct system includes 24 routes including Roo Express and Grocery Bus, which serve University of Akron, and the Northcoast Express to Downtown Cleveland.

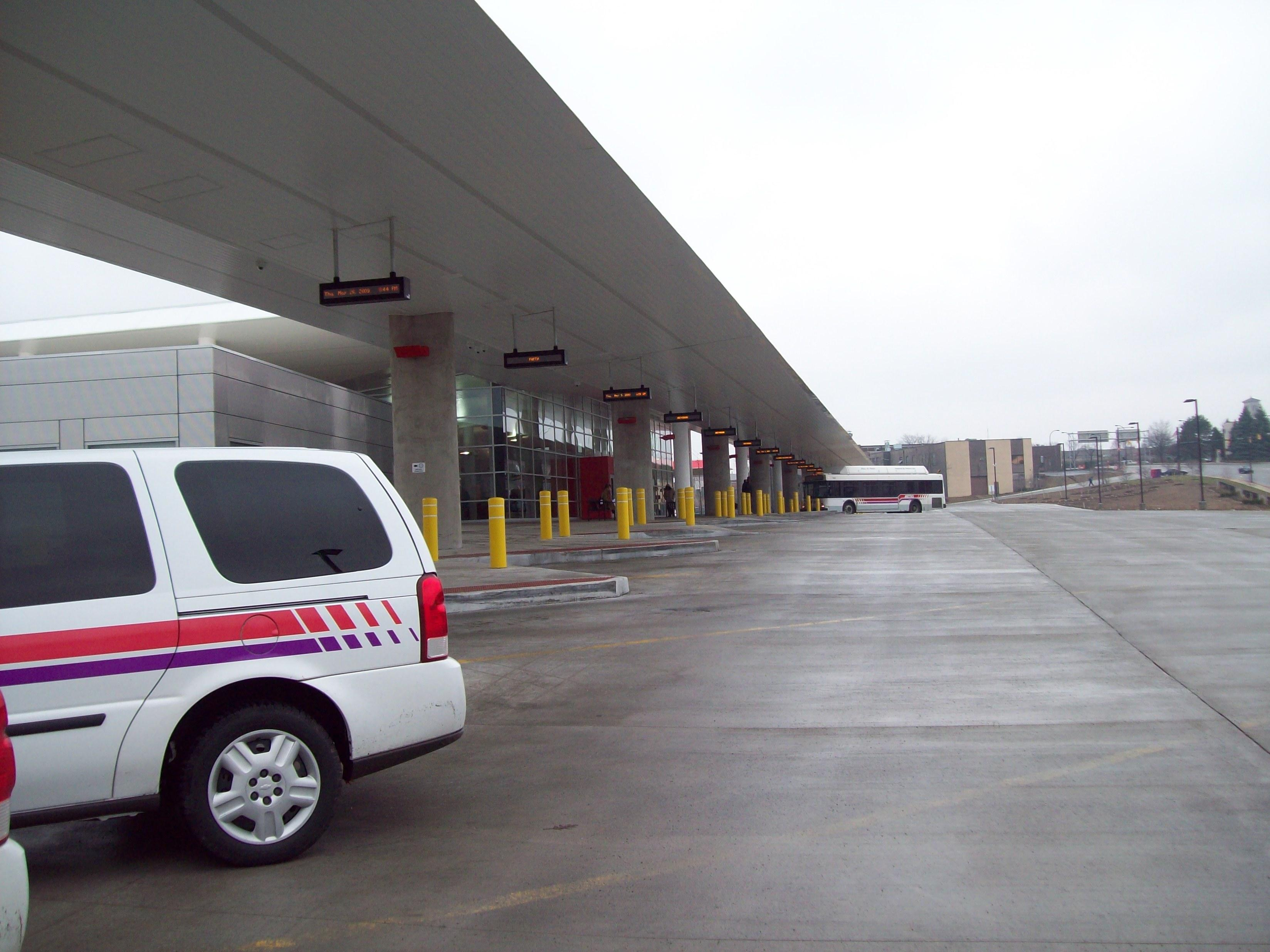
Metro Bus lineup

==== Connecting services ====
METRO RTA service offers a number of connection opportunities to other area transit agencies.

GCRTA, a neighboring transit agency, provides connecting services between Cuyahoga County, Ohio (Greater Cleveland) and Akron METRO RTA. The two systems connect with two lines in Maple Heights at Southgate Transit Center (31 & 32), near the Southgate USA plaza. GCRTA does not serve METRO RTA's Robert K. Pfaff Transit Center.

PARTA, a neighboring transit agency, offers services between Portage County, Ohio (Kent/Ravenna) and Akron, including service to METRO RTA's Robert K. Pfaff Transit Center (90), along with connections in Stow(30), and in Maple Heights (100).

SARTA, a neighboring transit agency, operates one hourly weekday and Saturday route between Canton and Akron starting at 6:00am, 6:45am and every :45 until 8:45pm. This route, 81 Canton Akron Express, connects with METRO RTA. SARTA route 81 also serves Downtown Canton, Akron-Canton Regional Airport, Belden Village Transit Center in North Canton, Ohio, & Staples on Arlington Road in Akron from both Akron and Canton. SARTA's route services METRO RTA's Robert K. Pfaff Transit Center. Effective in 2018, SARTA also operates a direct express route in the fall and spring directly from Akron Metro Transit Center to Stark State College in North Canton Ohio. This route is named the 88 Stark State Express and runs five times a day and services Akron Metro's RKP Downtown Transit Center Stark State College and Belden Village Transit Center respectively.

=== METRO Select ===
METRO RTA operates METRO SCAT and METRO NEXT on-demand transit under the METRO Select branding. METRO SCAT is intended for senior citizens and riders with disabilities who do not qualify for ADA paratransit service. METRO NEXT serves the southern portion of Summit County, connecting rural areas to fixed-route buses.

== Fares ==
METRO RTA charges $1.25 for single rides. Day, week, and month passes are also available for purchase. Senior citizens and people with disabilities get discounted fares.

== Routes ==
- 1 - West Market
- 2 - Arlington
- 3 - Copley / Barberton
- 6 - East Exchange / Canton Road
- 8 - Barberton/Norton/Wooster Road
- 9 - East Avenue / Battles
- 10 - Howard / Portage Trail
- 13 - Grant / Firestone
- 15 - Brown / Inman
- 16 - Euclid / Vernon Odom
- 19 - East Exchange / Eastland
- 20 - Tallmadge / Brimfield
- 22 - Howe / Stow-Kent
- 23 - Goodyear Heights / Gilchrist
- 25 - Kelly / Triplett
- 26 - Delia / White Pond
- 27 - West Exchange / Merriman Valley
- 29 - South Main / Manchester
- 31 - Cuyahoga Falls / Macedonia
- 32 - Hudson / Twinsburg
- 40 - Manchester / West Thornton
- 55 - Roo Express
- 61 - North-Coast Express
- 600 - Zone Service (Late night service only)
- Roo Express (Weekdays only)
- Grocery Bus (Weekdays only)

== Facilities ==
=== Head Office ===
Address: 416 Kenmore Boulevard, Akron
Coordinates: 41°02′58.6″N 81°32′26.8″W
Facilities: Head office, administration, vehicle storage and maintenance

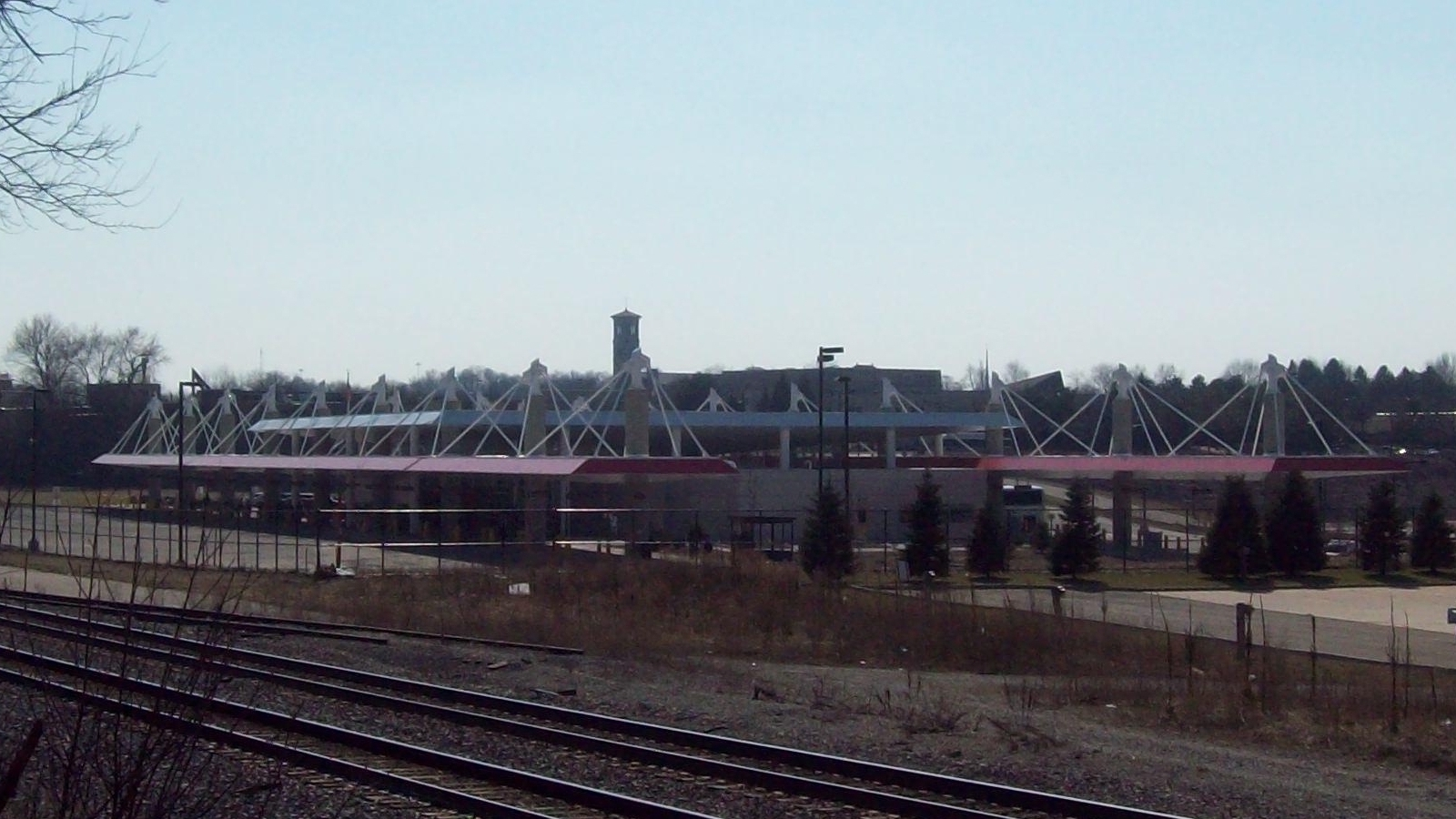
Robert K. Pfaff Transit Center

=== Robert K. Pfaff Transit Center ===
Address: 631 South Broadway Street, downtown Akron
Coordinates: 41°04′10″N 81°31′23″W
Facilities: Terminus for local bus routes, suburban routes, X61 North Coast Express bus service to Cleveland, intercity Greyhound services, and Stark County & Portage County connecting buses. Youngstown’s WRTA route 81 serves as the Akron Youngstown express
Opened: 18 January 2009

=== Romig Road Transit Center ===
Address: 2340 Romig Road, Akron
Facilities: Connector hub for routes 3 and 9 serving West Akron and Barberton, Ohio. This hub is in the former Rolling Acres Mall parking lot. The mall has been shut down since 2008.

=== Independence Transit Center (Chapel Hill) ===
Serving North Akron/Cuyahoga Falls and routes 10, 19, 20 & 22, "Independence Transit Center" is similar to Rolling Acres Transit Center which also has no public restroom but does have indoor waiting shelter facilities.

== See also ==
- List of bus transit systems in the United States
- Stark Area Regional Transit Authority
