= Stark Area Regional Transit Authority =

Transit agency in Stark County, Ohio

Coordinates: 40.780891°N 81.368061°W

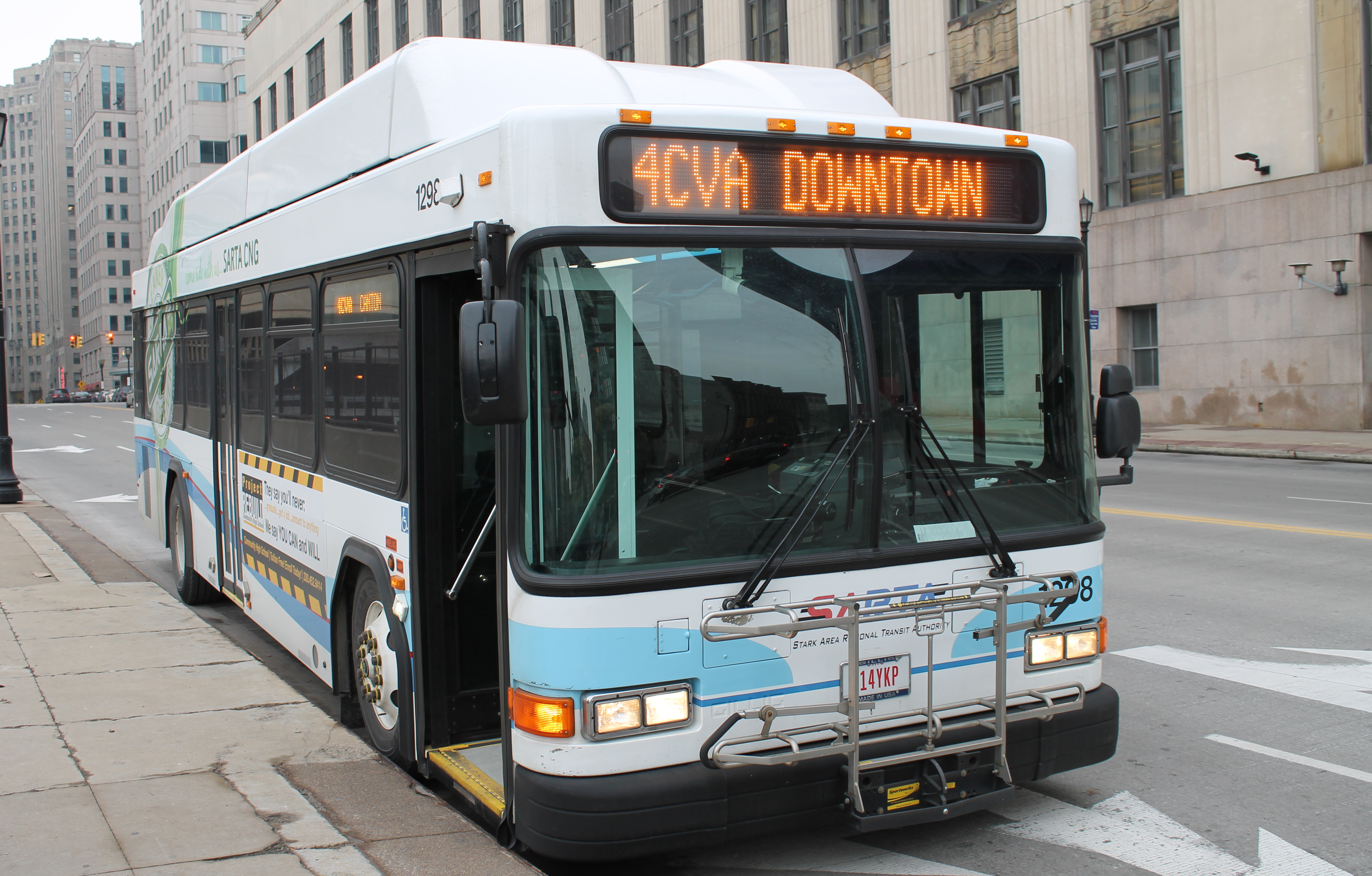
- A SARTA bus in downtown Cleveland
- Founded: 1997
- Headquarters: 1600 Gateway Blvd SE; Canton, Ohio
- Service area: Stark County, Ohio
- Service type: bus service, paratransit
- Routes: 32
- Stops: 1,554
- Stations: 4
- Fleet: 80
- Daily ridership: 5,900 (weekdays, Q2 2026)
- Annual ridership: 1,406,800 (2025)
- Fuel type: Diesel, Diesel-electric hybrid, CNG, Hydrogen Fuel Cell
- Chief executive: Ralph Lee
- Website: sartaonline.com

Stark Area Regional Transit Authority (SARTA) is a public sector transit agency servicing Stark County, Ohio. In addition to its regular line service within Stark County, SARTA runs one bus route (with multiple times) between Canton and downtown Akron, connecting to Akron's METRO RTA bus system and serving the Akron-Canton Regional Airport. In 2025, the system had a ridership of 1,406,800, or about 5,900 per weekday as of the second quarter of 2026.

SARTA's administrative office and bus garage are located in Canton. It is managed by CEO/Executive Director Ralph Lee, as well as a 9-member board of trustees. SARTA is primarily funded by a county 0.25% sales tax which was first approved in 1997 and renewed in 2002, 2006 and 2011.

== History ==
On December 1, 1997, the Canton Regional Transit Authority became the Stark Area Regional Transit Authority (SARTA) and service to all of Stark County was established.

SARTA is governed by a nine-member Board of Trustees with the Executive Director/CEO serving as Secretary/Treasurer. The members are appointed to a three-year consecutive term. Appointments are made by the Stark County Council of Government, Stark County Commissioners, and the cities of Canton, Massillon and Alliance.

SARTA employed approximately 190 individuals as of June 15, 2012. The position breakdown is approximately 63% Coach Operators, 12% Mechanics and Service Personnel (who service a fleet of 80 revenue buses and 12 non-revenue service vehicles), 25% Administrative Staff and a couple Part-time Employees and/or Interns.

As SARTA grew, satellite offices were added to better serve the county's public transportation needs. SARTA established four transfer stations and customer service offices. The Alliance Transfer Center was created to serve northeastern Stark County. The Massillon Transfer Center was created to serve the southwestern part of the county. The downtown Canton Transfer Center (also known as Cornerstone) was created to serve the heart of Stark County. The Belden Village Transit Center was opened to serve the Belden Village shopping area, as well as businesses and local colleges.

== Transit Centers ==
Canton Cornerstone Transit Center in downtown Canton is the main transfer hub for SARTA. It is located in downtown Canton at 112 Cherry Avenue SE at the corner of Cherry Avenue and East Tuscarawas Street. Operations began on August 6, 2003. The center is named Cornerstone. The new transit center includes both an indoor customer service center and an outdoor bus-boarding plaza that accommodates 16 SARTA buses per hour. The 3,163-square-foot (293.9 m^{2}) facility also provides interior and exterior amenities for Lakefont Lines (previously Greyhound Lines) through an occupancy agreement with SARTA. Approximately 200 guests attended the grand opening and ribbon-cutting ceremony for the intermodal facility.

'Canton Cornerstone Routes' - 4, 81, 101, 102, 103, 105, 106, 107, 108, 110, 111, 113, 114, 117, 118, 119, 139, 151, 152, 153, 157

The Alliance Transfer Center is located at 10 Prospect Street in Alliance. It replaced an older, smaller facility a few blocks away and officially opened on November 23, 2008.

'Alliance Routes' - 130, 131, 132, 133, 139

The Massillon Transfer Center is now being constructed at a new location at 227 Tommy Henrich Drive NW off of Lincoln Way East and State Route 21. The original Massillon Transit Center at 41 Erie Street South had opened November 24, 2001 and now closed on December 17 2021.

'Massillon Routes' - 102, 122, 124, 125, 126, 128, 152, 157

The Belden Village Transfer Center opened on September 1, 2011, and is located at 4700 Whipple Avenue NW in Canton. The $2.5 million facility replaced an outdoor transfer point at Higbee Avenue NW and Munson Street NW. The building features improved amenities such as a climate-controlled interior, restrooms, vending machines, free wireless internet service, a passenger drop-off lane and interior and exterior waiting areas. The building is also anticipated to be LEED Silver certified and incorporates many energy saving features such as geothermal heating.

'Belden Village Routes' - 45, 81, 105, 106, 121, 125, 151

Route List

- 45 - North Canton/Belden Village/Stark State College & Kent State Stark
- 81 - Downtown Akron/Akron Canton Airport/Belden Village (VIA I-77)
- 101 - Harrisburg/Harmont/Route 62/Walmart (NE Canton)
- 102 - Downtown Massillon/Perry Township/Downtown Canton (VIA State Route 172-West Tuscarawas Street)
- 103 - Plain Township/GlenOak High School (NE Canton)
- 105 - Belden Village/North Canton (VIA Cleveland Ave & Everhard Rd)
- 106 - Belden Village/Meyers Lake Plaza/Aultman Hospital
- 107 - East Canton (NE Canton)
- 108 - Washington Square (VIA Market Ave N - State Route 43)
- 110 - Sherrick Rd/Warner Road (SE Canton)
- 111 - Gross Ave/Maple Ave/Route 62/Walmart/Stark County Jail
- 113 - Southway/Perry (Perry Township/SW Canton)
- 114 - Southgate Plaza (Canton Township/SE Canton)
- 117 - Stark County Fairgrounds/Cleveland Clinic Mercy Hospital (NW Canton)
- 118 - Navarre Rd/Perry Hills Colony/Sterilite & Shearer's (SW Canton)
- 119 - Frazer Ave/44th St/Plain Township (NW Canton)
- 121 - Whipple Ave/The Strip
- 124 - SE Massillon
- 125 - Massillon/Belden Village/Jackson Township
- 126 - NW Massillon
- 128 - Erie St/Route 21/Massillon Marketplace/Navarre YMCA/Sterilite & Shearer's
- 130 - Alliance North
- 131 - State Street/Union Ave
- 132 - Alliance East
- 139 - Downtown Canton/Downtown Louisville/Downtown Alliance
- 151 - North Late Night Loop
- 152 - West Late Night Loop
- 153 - Canton Late Night Loop (SE SW NE Canton Only)
- 157 - Massillon Success Express (Navarre Nickles Bakery/Sterilite & Shearer's/Freshmark Massillon
- 158 - Canton Community Circular (Route Walmart Tuscarawas and Walmart Route 62 via Mahoning Road )

== Service ==
SARTA transported over 2.4 million riders in 2011, up 300,000 from 2010. All vehicles in SARTA's fleet can operate as fixed route buses. Thirty-seven vehicles are demand-response/paratransit (Proline) vehicles. SARTA operates 33 fixed routes as of June 2012. Both fixed route and Proline service operate more than 20 hours each day except Sundays and certain holidays.

The fixed route service fleet covers an average of 7,500 miles per day and reaches within ½ mile of 79% of Stark County's population. Proline (countywide demand-response/paratransit service) provides on average 140,000 trips a year for customers who meet ADA requirements.

== Environmental sustainability ==
On May 18, 2012, SARTA opened a public/private Compressed Natural Gas (CNG) fueling station at the company headquarters in Canton. The facility was the first public CNG station in Stark County and Northeast Ohio with the next closest located outside of Columbus. The grand opening for the facility was attended by dozens of guests including U.S. Senator Sherrod Brown and Canton Mayor William J. Healy II. The CNG fueling station was certified by the Stark County Auditor's Office Division of Weight and Measurements on June 12, 2012. As of October 9, 2012, the CNG price was $1.89 per gallon equivalent for public fueling. CNG vehicles are quieter, require fewer oil changes and reduce emissions by over 80% when compared to traditional diesel buses.

In 2016, SARTA launched busses powered by Hydrogen Fuel-Cell (HFC). By 2026, 96 of SARTA's buses were powered by CNG and another 20 were fueled by HFC.

== Accomplishments ==
- SARTA won the American Public Transportation Association's 2006 "Outstanding Public Transportation System Achievement Award" for bus companies serving 1 million to 4 million riders a year.
- SARTA provides extensive shuttle service for the Pro Football Hall of Fame activities.
- On September 12, 2011, SARTA was recognized as a Three-Star Ohio Green Fleet by Clean Fuels Ohio.

== See also ==
- List of bus transit systems in the United States
- Alliance station
- METRO Regional Transit Authority
