= Ontario Mills =

Shopping mall in San Bernardino County, California, U.S.

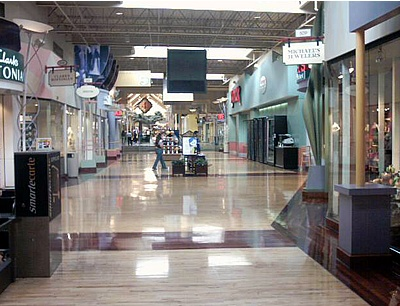
- Concourse (March 2005)
- Location: Ontario, California, United States
- Coordinates: 34.073777°N 117.551908°W
- Address: 1 Mills Circle
- Opened: November 14, 1996; 30 years ago
- Renovated: 2012; 2015–2016
- Developer: The Mills Corporation; Simon DeBartolo Group; KanAm Group
- Manager: Simon Premium Outlets; The Mills: A Simon Company
- Owner: Simon Property Group (50%); JPMorgan Chase (50%)
- Architect: F+A Architects
- Num. of stores: 200+ (at peak)
- Num. of anchor tenants: 20 (at peak)
- Floor area: 1,421,863 square feet (132,095 m^{2})
- Floors: 1
- Parking: Parking lot
- Website: www.simon.com/mall/ontario-mills
- Building details
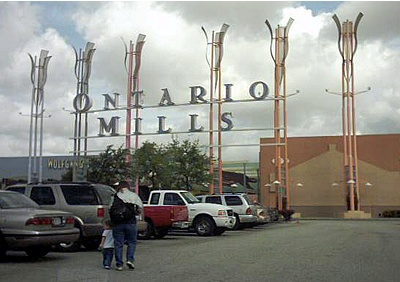
- Entrance to Ontario Mills (March 2005)

General information
- Status: Operational

Renovating team
- Architect: raSmith
- Renovating firm: Simon Property Group

Ontario Mills is a super-regional outlet mall in Ontario, California, within the Los Angeles metropolitan area. With 28 million annual visitors, it is one of the top shopping and tourist destinations in California.

Simon Property Group owns the mall in a 50/50 joint venture with JPMorgan Chase. The mall is near the Ontario International Airport and Auto Club Speedway, as well as the interchange between the Ontario Freeway (Interstate 15) and the San Bernardino Freeway (Interstate 10), one of the busiest in Southern California.

== Overview ==
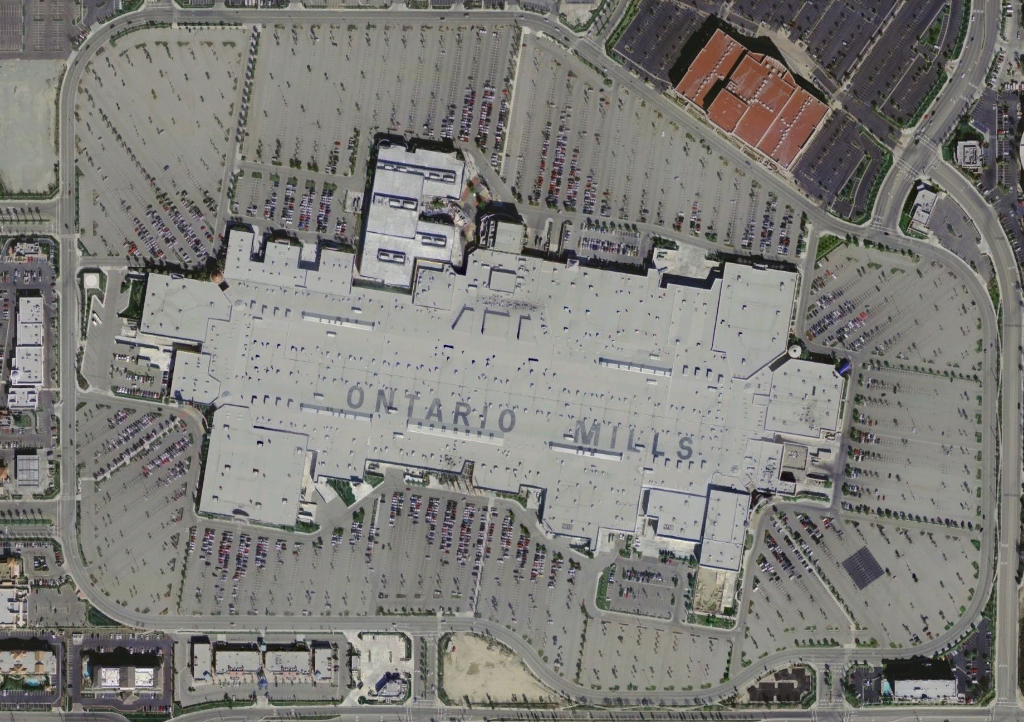
Aerial view by NASA

According to the mall's former owners, The Mills Corporation, it is the largest single-story shopping mall in Western North America. In addition, it is California's largest outlet and value retail shopping destination.

Like most Mills malls, Ontario Mills is divided into neighborhoods. This mall has the most out of the Mills malls with ten. The mall once featured two competing entertainment chains—Dave & Buster's and GameWorks—until the latter closed in 2017.

== History ==
=== 1988–2004: Development, opening, and early years ===
Ontario Mills was announced in February 1988 by the Washington, D.C.-based Western Development Corporation (the former developer of the Landmark Mills malls before the April 1994 corporate spin-off as the Mills Corporation). The concept for the project would span approximately 1.5 million square feet (140,000 m^{2}), featuring around 250 stores of retail outlets, specialty stores, and off-price shops. As common for Landmark Mills malls, Ontario Mills would also feature a movie theater and a food court known as Big Food, divided into themed concourses referred to as "neighborhoods" in a racetrack-like format to help shoppers identify where they are.

The site was selected on the former location of the Ontario Motor Speedway. German-based KanAm would help fund and develop the project alongside Western Development. Melvin Simon & Associates held joint venture interests in Ontario Mills, and the mall was originally slated to open in 1991. However, development was delayed due to financial struggles and legal hurdles. As a result, construction started in 1995 under new CEO Laurence C. Siegel, who oversaw the project's completion at a total cost of $150 million. Ontario Mills had its grand opening on November 14, 1996, timed at the holiday season and generating immediate success with over 150,000 visitors and $7 million in sales on its first day.

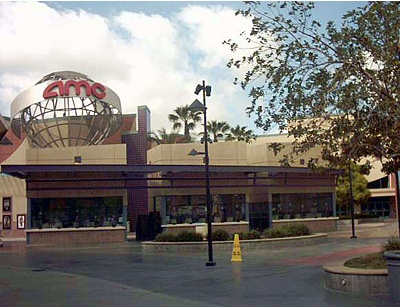
Main entrance to AMC Ontario Mills 30 in March 2005

On December 13, 1996, AMC Theatres opened AMC Ontario Mills 30 at the mall, which was the world's largest megaplex at the time, with 30 screens. It established a record individual theater gross of $168,932 for the company. Dave & Buster's opened at the mall on March 13, 1997, followed by GameWorks on July 20, 1997. In May 2002, Simon Property Group sold its interests in Ontario Mills back to the Mills Corp. and KanAm–alongside four other Mills malls–for $430 million.

In August 2004, Mills and KanAm sold a 50% stake in the property to a fund managed by JPMorgan Fleming Asset Management for approximately $243 million, with the Mills Corp. retaining the remaining shares. Ontario Mills was formerly home to a Vans Skatepark, which was announced in May 2003 to close permanently.

=== 2007–2018: Simon Property Group ===
In February 2007, The Mills Corp.'s portfolio, including its 50% interest in Ontario Mills, would be acquired by Simon Property Group and Farallon Capital Management for $1.64 billion. This was because Mills was financially struggling by May 2006. The acquisition was completed in April 2007, and the Mills Corporation was rebranded as The Mills: A Simon Company.

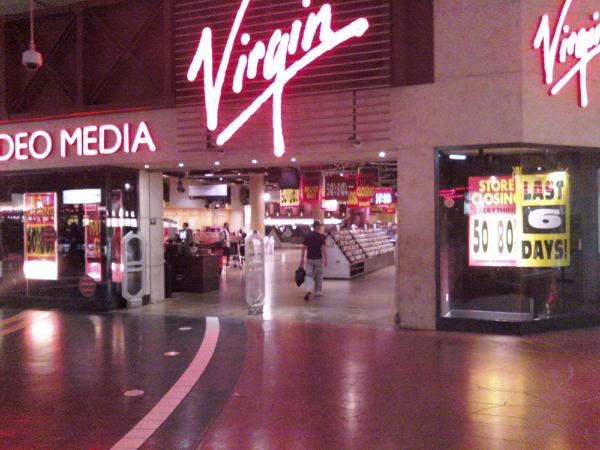
Virgin Megastore at Ontario Mills during liquidation. This store closed permanently on January 31, 2009, as its lease was not renewed.

The mall's Burlington Coat Factory was expanded to 112,000 sq ft (10,400 m^{2}) in October 2010. In January 2012, Simon announced that Ontario Mills' food court, rebranded as "The Market", and the exterior of the mall would be remodeled for a "contemporary feel", alongside an expansion of the Forever 21 and Nordstrom Rack stores. Banana's Ultimate Juice Bar closed during this time and was replaced by a Dairy Queen/Orange Julius combination, alongside several smaller local vendors. In March 2012, Simon Property Group acquired full control of the property's management by buying out Farallon's stake in 26 Landmark Mills malls for $1.5 billion.

JCPenney sold its JCPenney Outlet Store division to SB Capital Group, and the store converted into JC's 5 Star Outlet, which closed its Ontario Mills location in early 2014, alongside the rest as the division as a result of its unsuccessful rebranding and performance. The former JCPenney Outlet space was renovated in April 2016 to introduce 12 new stores and restaurants, alongside an expansion to Ontario Mills itself known as Fashion Alley, featuring The North Face, Original Penguin, Samsonite, Uniqlo and Blaze Pizza. The expansion opened on April 29, 2016, with a new mall entrance being added to access the concourse. raSmith of Brookfield, Wisconsin was the architect of the renovations.

Despite the mall turning 20 years old in November 2016, Simon executives stated that they were "not planning anything special" for Ontario Mills. The general manager of Simon, Marc Smith, publicly stated the 20th anniversary was "not a big deal" to him, preferring to focus on the "transformation" of adding new tenants. Toys "R" Us Outlet would open in May 2017, and GameWorks closed permanently on July 5, 2017, after its lease expired. In July 2017, the mall got seven new stores, including Stickhouse, WeStyle, Francesca's, BoxLunch, and Kidpik. Toys "R" Us filed for Chapter 11 bankruptcy and closed all of its U.S. stores in the summer of 2018, including the Ontario Mills location.

=== 2020–present ===
Ontario Mills closed temporarily on March 18, 2020, due to the COVID-19 pandemic, alongside other Simon properties in the U.S. The mall reopened on May 26, 2020, under strict social distancing guidelines. Daiso closed permanently in February 2024. MOIDA debuted in the same duration, alongside Lush Cosmetics, Psycho Bunny, and Vitamin World.

In March 2025, Marc Jacobs and Suit Emporium opened at the mall, with later additions being Popeyes, Carbonstar, New Balance, and TARANIS opening in the spring and summer months. The mall's Forever 21 closed permanently in May of that year as the company went out of business in the U.S. due to Chapter 11 bankruptcy. Slick City Action Park opened in March 2026, giving the mall another entertainment tenant.

==== 2026 fire ====
On April 10, 2026, a fire broke out at the mall that affected several stores, such as True Religion Brand Jeans. The 28-year-old Luis Javier Gallegos Jr. of Rancho Cucamonga, the perpetrator of the fire, has been arrested. No injuries were reported. As of April 27, 2026, True Religion Outlet remains temporarily closed for repairs.

== See also ==
- Sawgrass Mills, another flagship Landmark Mills mall
- Tsawwassen Mills, a Canadian property that is also oval-shaped
