= Colorado Mills =

Shopping mall in Jefferson County

- Interior view (April 2009)
- Location: Lakewood, Colorado, United States
- Coordinates: 39°44′04″N 105°09′38″W
- Address: 14500 W. Colfax Avenue
- Opened: November 15, 2002; 23 years ago (reopened November 20, 2017; 8 years ago after hailstorm damage)
- Renovated: 2017–2020
- Developer: The Mills Corporation and Taubman Centers; Stevinson Associates, KanAm Group
- Manager: Simon Premium Outlets; The Mills: A Simon Company
- Owner: KanAm Group, Stevinson family (62.5%); Simon Property Group (37.5%)
- Architect: JPRA Architects; CommunityArts
- Num. of stores: 180+ (200 at peak before remodel)
- Num. of anchor tenants: 20 (at peak)
- Floor area: 1,411,627 square feet (131,000 m^{2})
- Floors: 1 (2 in former Forever 21)
- Parking: Parking lot
- Website: www.simon.com/mall/colorado-mills
- Building details
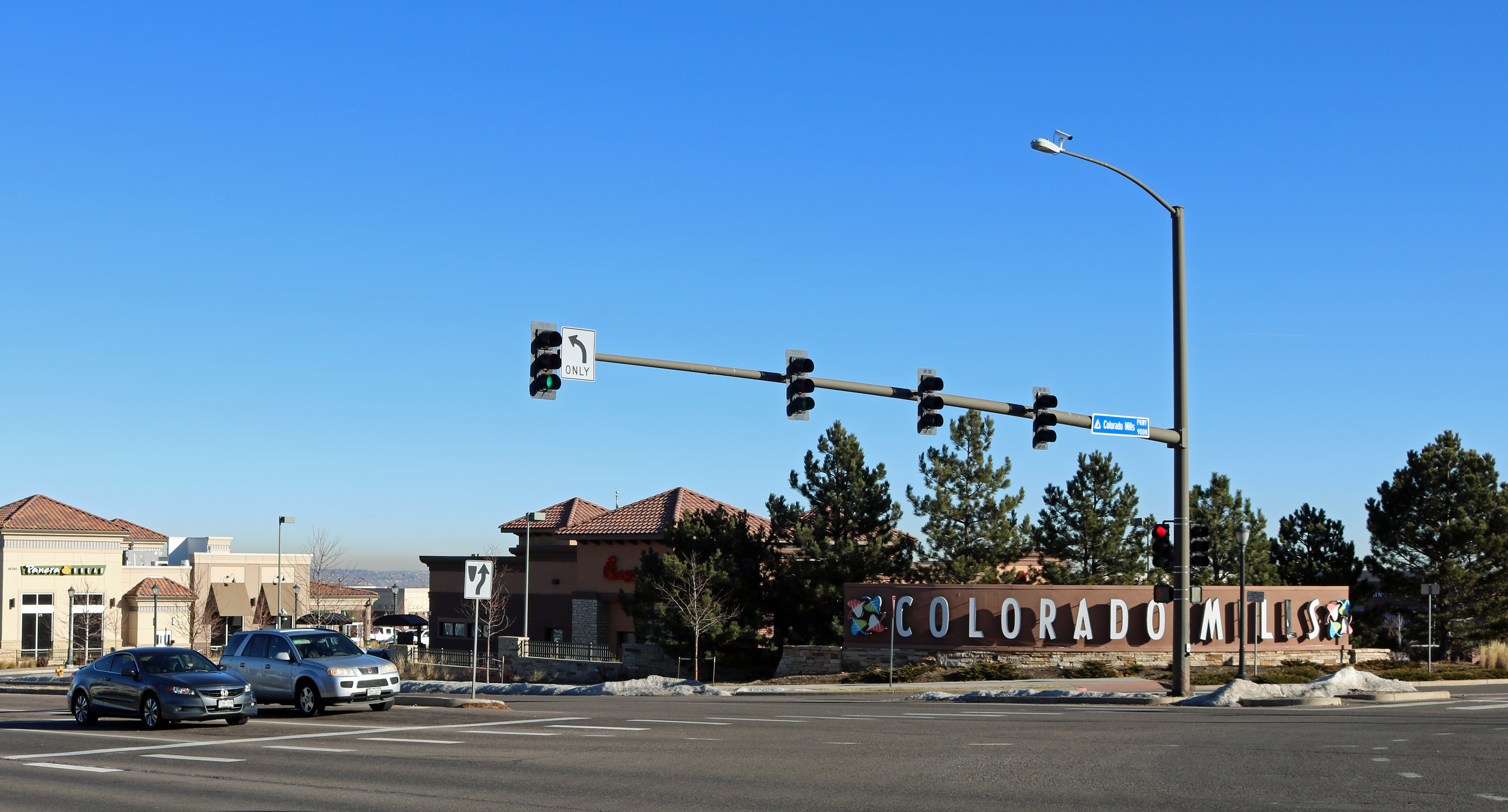
- West entrance (December 2016)
- Alternative names: Colorado Mills 2.0 (2017–present)

General information
- Status: Operational
- Construction started: Spring 2001; 25 years ago
- Completed: 2002

Design and construction
- Main contractor: Saunders Construction

Renovating team
- Architect: The Beck Group
- Renovating firm: Simon Property Group
- Main contractor: Progressive Roofing

Colorado Mills is a super-regional shopping mall in Lakewood, Colorado, serving as the Denver metropolitan area's only indoor outlet center. The mall has 1,411,627 square feet (131,000 m^{2}), with 12 anchor stores, a variety of fast food restaurants, fast casual dining, and dine-in restaurants.

The mall has over 180 stores (200 at its peak), many of which are outlet stores, as well as many locally owned and operated stores, and a large variety of kiosks. Colorado Mills was primarily developed by the Mills Corporation, and is managed by Simon Property Group, which owns a 37.5% stake in the mall, while KanAm and the Stevinsons handle the remaining shares. After being severely damaged by a hailstorm in May 2017, the entire mall was remodeled, earning the nickname Colorado Mills 2.0.

== History ==
=== Background ===
The planning for Colorado Mills dates back to the early 1970s, where Greg Stevinson's father, Chuck Stevinson, selected a 130-acre (53 ha) site south of West Colfax Avenue in Lakewood that was formerly industrial land, with Interstate 70 nearby. They had the long-term goal of building a retail center. Following his father's cancer diagnosis in the early 1980s, Greg and his brother Kent took over the family's real estate and automotive holdings. Greg spent the next 15 years searching for the right development partner to realize the mall dream.

=== 1994–2012: Development, opening, and acquisition ===
Spring Court (April 2006)

Zoning and annexation for the planned shopping center on the site being approved in 1994. Stevinson eventually partnered with the San Diego, California-based Hahn Company (later TrizecHahn) for the project. However, in August 1999, the partnership was dissolved due to two major problems that would affect the proposal: TrizecHahn's assets were sold to the Rouse Company and Westfield Group because TrizecHahn exited the retail business, and major department stores pulled out of the project.

Plans for the site were revised and announced in March 2000, as Greg Stevinson formed a joint venture between three new developers: the Arlington, Virginia-based Mills Corporation, the Bloomfield Hills, Michigan-based Taubman Company, and the German-based investment firm KanAm, which helped fund and develop the project. The developers would build a 1.2-million-square-foot (110,000 m^{2}) complex on the site that would cost $250 million to develop. Planned anchors for the mall included Nordstrom Rack, Saks Off 5th, Bass Pro Shops Outdoor World, and Burlington Coat Factory. The number of anchors planned for the mall was 20. Additional include 200 tenants, a western art museum, and a skating rink. The mall, expected to open in the fall of 2001, was estimated to generate $300 million in revenue each year. Nearly 3,000 employees would be required to staff the shops, and the amount of construction jobs were estimated to 2,500 to build them. Construction on Colorado Mills began in spring 2001.

On November 15, 2002, Colorado Mills officially opened to the public at around 6 a.m. MST. The mall's original entertainment tenants included ESPN X Games Skatepark, Jillian's Entertainment, SuperTarget, and United Artists Theater & IMAX (later Regal UA Colorado Mills IMAX & RPX), with 16 screens. The mall's general contractor was Saunders Construction, Inc., and its once-colorful neighborhoods were designed by CommArts, which used a "four seasons" theme. The architect for the mall was JPRA Architects of Michigan.

Due to the Mills Corporation's financial struggles, their portfolio, including Colorado Mills, was announced in February 2007 to be acquired by Simon Property Group and Farallon Capital Management for $1.64 billion. The acquisition was completed in April 2007, and the Mills Corp. was relaunched as The Mills: A Simon Company.

Interior of Borders (December 2008)

Borders Books and Music would close in mid-September 2011 after choosing to liquidate all U.S. locations, including Colorado Mills, due to Chapter 11 bankruptcy. In March 2012, Simon Property Group acquired full control of the property's management by buying out Farallon's stake in 26 Landmark Mills malls for $1.5 billion.

=== 2017–present: Reconstruction as Colorado Mills 2.0 ===
Incomplete Target sign as the mall was still recovering from hailstorm damage (November 2017)

On May 8, 2017, Colorado Mills was severely damaged by a hailstorm and closed for six months. Golf-ball to baseball-sized hail punched thousands of holes in the mall's roof, leading to massive water intrusion that flooded nearly all 1.2-million-square-foot (110,000 m^{2}) (Note: Some sources might say "1.1-million-square-foot (100,000 m^{2})" instead of "1.2-million-square-foot (110,000 m^{2}).") of the interior. J.S. Held attracted contractors from across the U.S. to help monitor the loss and address the needs for the tenants. The heavy damage required a total demolition of the mall's then-15-year-old TPO (thermoplastic polyolefin) roof and replacement by Progressive Roofing, alongside infrastructure including the mall's sprinkler system, air-conditioning, and electrical systems, alongside a massive renovation developed by Simon Property Group and designed by the Beck Group, nicknamed "Colorado Mills 2.0". The repair process was extensive: 12,345 light fixtures were replaced, and 200,000 sheets of drywall was installed, equal to 183 acres (74 ha). Some individuals stores had their roofs replaced by separate roofing firms, such as Imperial Roof Systems Company for SuperTarget. It was also noted on June 13, 2017, that several tenants already had suffered from roof leaks prior to the hailstorm. Jumpstreet reopened on June 16, 2017.

The mall itself partially reopened on November 21, 2017, with Simon executives reporting that the hailstorm led to multiple stores to close temporarily or permanently, with only about 130 still open after repairs. However, the slow process of the reconstruction led to tenants like Bell Brand to sue Simon in March 2018, which argued that the mall was still 42% closed. In August 2018, it was announced that more retailers, being Nike Factory Store, H&M, Gap Factory Outlet, and Banana Republic Factory Outlet would be returning. Crazy 8 closed its doors in January 2019 after its parent company, Gymboree, filed for Chapter 11 bankruptcy. The mall itself closed temporarily again in March 2020—alongside all other Simon malls in the country—due to the COVID-19 pandemic. Slick City Action Park held a grand opening week at Colorado Mills starting on July 28, 2022.

The Cheesecake Factory announced a grand opening at Colorado Mills with a date of May 13, 2025, hiring over 300 staff members starting in mid-March 2025. In late May 2025, Simon Property Group modified its $110 million loan, extending the majority through November 2026. This followed a period in special servicing due to concerns about the mall's declining appraisal value, which dropped 37% from 2014 levels to $135 million. On September 18, 2026, Simon, under legal affiliate Colorado Mills Mall Limited Partnership, filed a lawsuit against Align Yoga Fitness Wellness for $525,000 in unpaid rent and breach of contract. Align Yoga occupied a 3,390 sq ft (315 m^{2}) space inside the mall, and it had to pay $7,300 (later $7,450) monthly, as well as $39,500 in annual taxes. The studio signed an amended repayment lease that extended through 2029, though they breached this by abruptly closing permanently on May 27, 2026.

On November 5, 2026, Simon secured a $93 million loan to refinance Colorado Mills, with $80 million being sold to a commercial mortgage-backed securities (CMBS) pool. Simon, KanAm, and the Stevinson family arranged the new 10-year mortgage, which carries an interest rate of roughly 6.84% through November 2036, via Goldman Sachs and German American Capital Corporation (GACC).

== See also ==
- Opry Mills, which was damaged by the 2010 Tennessee floods and also underwent reconstruction by Simon Property Group
