= Gallery Place =

Gallery Place is the name of two adjacent places in Washington, D.C.:

- Gallery Place station, on the Washington metro
- Gallery Place (shopping center), shopping center
