= St. Louis Mills =

Defunct mall in Hazelwood, Missouri, U.S.

St. Louis Outlet Mall

- Neighborhood 5 concourse (December 2016)
- Location: Hazelwood, Missouri, U.S.
- Coordinates: 38.7887°N 90.4137°W
- Address: 5555 St. Louis Mills Boulevard
- Opened: November 13, 2003; 23 years ago
- Closed: June 2019; 7 years ago (mall interior)
- Demolished: April–May 2023 (interior only)
- Previous names: Missouri Mills (initially planned); St. Louis Mills (2003–2012)
- Developer: The Mills Corporation; KanAm Group
- Manager: Industrial Commercial Properties
- Owner: Industrial Commercial Properties
- Architect: Kiku Obata & Company
- Num. of stores: 200+ (at peak)
- Num. of anchor tenants: 13 (at peak)
- Floor area: 1,191,666 square feet (110,000 m^{2})
- Floors: 1
- Parking: Parking lot with 5,000 free spaces
- Website: stlouisoutletmall.com at the Wayback Machine (archived November 6, 2018)
- Building details
- PBS Kids Backyard wing (December 2016)

Design and construction
- Main contractor: Grau Contracting; Niehaus Construction Services; JDR Construction

St. Louis Mills, also known as St. Louis Outlet Mall, was a super-regional shopping mall in Hazelwood, Missouri, United States, a suburb of St. Louis. Primarily developed by the Mills Corporation, the mall struggled with tenancy and maintenance issues for many years before closing in 2019. The first redevelopment effort, a sports complex called the POWERplex STL, operated from 2020 to 2023. The building's interior was gutted in 2023 and redeveloped into the Hazelwood Business Park, an industrial warehouse and office building.

Simon Property Group owned the mall after they acquired the Mills Corp. in April 2007, but the property underwent foreclosure in 2012, and was acquired by LNR Partners LLC and the Woodmont Company, which renamed the shopping center to St. Louis Outlet Mall. In 2016, the mall was acquired by Namdar Realty Group and its partner, Mason Asset Management, which neglected the property. After that, the mall's occupancy dropped below 50%, and it failed due to economic issues, competition from the Saint Louis Galleria, the rise of Chesterfield's own open-air outlet malls, and being built in an oversaturated market.

== History ==
=== 2001–2003: Development and opening ===
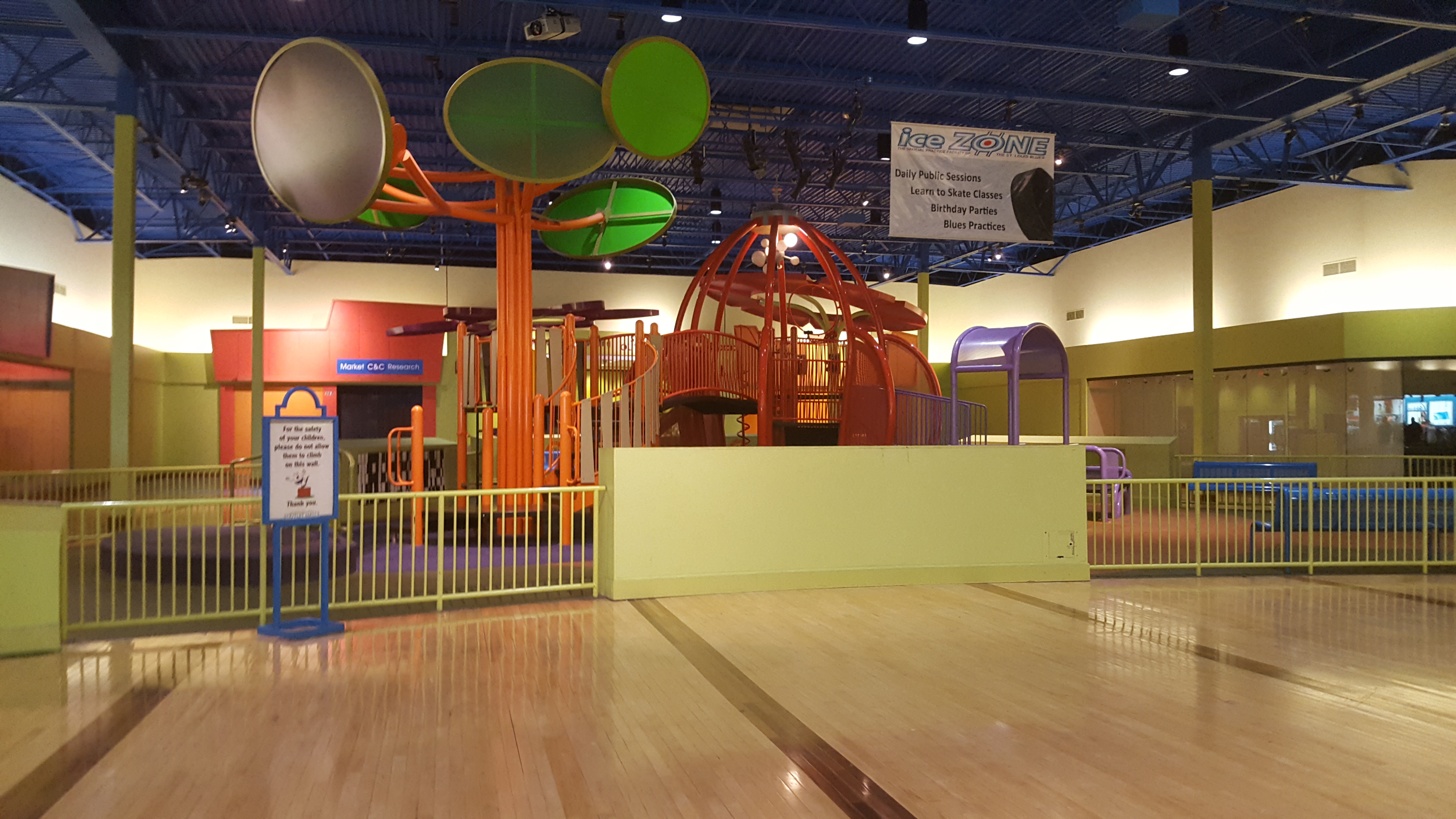
Former PBS Kids Backyard, which became a generic children's play area (December 2016)

In July 2001, The Mills Corporation entered a joint venture with German-based KanAm and acquired a 200-acre (81 ha) site in Hazelwood, Missouri off Missouri Route 370 for $20 million, They proposed St. Louis Mills in August 2002; typical of their properties, St. Louis Mills would include a mix of outlet stores, big-box stores, entertainment venues, and conventional tenants. During its planning phases, the mall was originally going to be called "Missouri Mills".

St. Louis Mills was a 1.2-million-square-foot (110,000 m^{2}) facility that cost $250 million to develop, and it had its grand opening on November 13, 2003, with 175 retailers eight anchor stores: Saks Off 5th, Bed Bath & Beyond, Marshalls Mega Store, Burlington Coat Factory, Books-A-Million, Circuit City, and an 18-screen Regal Cinemas (operating as Regal Cinemas St. Louis Mills Stadium 18 & IMAX), alongside Bass Pro Shops, Neiman Marcus Last Call, and Sears Outlet. The mall originally featured colorful assets, including a food court designed to pay homage to the 1904 St. Louis World's Fair. Interactive attractions included SportStreet, and the first PBS Kids Backyard learn-and-play area as part of a licensing agreement between the Mills Corporation and PBS. The mall was designed by local architectural firm Kiku Obata & Company, which also designed Concord Mills in North Carolina.

The mall performed well during the 2003 holiday season, being 95% leased and attracting many locals from St. Louis.

=== 2006–2019: Decline and closure ===
In 2006, St. Louis Mills was 99% occupied. However, lawsuits by the Securities and Exchange Commission (SEC) and the Mills Corp.'s own founder, Herbert S. Miller, revealed that St. Louis Mills was built in an oversaturated market, making it vulnerable to being unprofitable. The 2006 closure of the nearby Ford assembly plant, combined with the decline of Trans World Airlines (TWA), resulted in local economic instability, which led to low foot traffic. Due to Mills' financial struggles, their assets, including St. Louis Mills, would be acquired by Simon Property Group and Farallon Capital Management for $1.64 billion. The acquisition was completed in April 2007, and Mills was rebranded as The Mills: A Simon Company. However, Mills defaulted on a $90 million loan from Morgan Stanley in 2006, and they were inherited by Simon after they failed to make payments during the 2007 acquisition of company.

A 130,000 sq ft (12,000 m^{2}) Cabela's superstore would open at the mall on April 13, 2007, as the company's first Missouri location. On March 8, 2009, Circuit City closed all of its stores, including the St. Louis Mills location, after filing for Chapter 7 bankruptcy, which was previously Chapter 11 in November 2008. In August 2012, the Miami, Florida-based LNR Partners LLC acquired St. Louis Mills through foreclosure. The Woodmont Company took over management of the mall, and in late October 2012, the mall was renamed St. Louis Outlet Mall to "more accurately reflect" the mall's offerings, alongside the "Mills" name being trademarked by Simon in the U.S. Ross Dress For Less had its grand opening on March 9, 2013, in the former Circuit City space.

In mid-November 2015, LNR Partners put St. Louis Outlet Mall up for sale. Namdar Realty Group and Mason Asset Management purchased the mall in February 2016 for $4.4 million, which was roughly 98% off its original construction cost. That year, St. Louis Outlet Mall's occupancy rate was down to 77%. Books-A-Million closed in early 2017, and was replaced by Hope Church in July 2017 as the mall suffered from a near 50% vacancy rate. The church signed a 15-year lease in 2017, and invested nearly $1 million into upgrading the 40,000 sq ft (3,700 m^{2}) space.

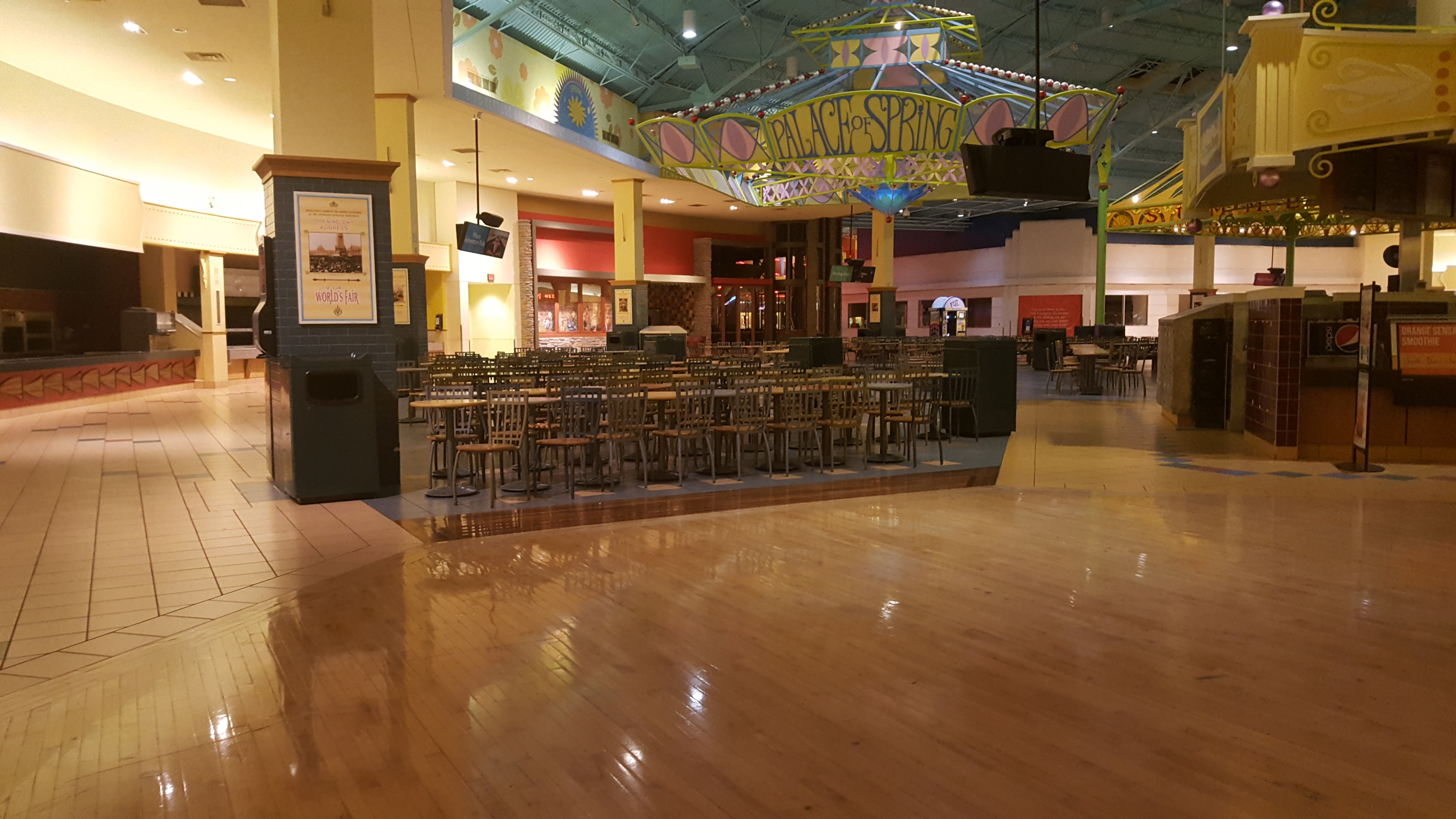
World's Fair Food Court, which was almost fully empty (December 2016)

Neighborhood 6 concourse (December 2016)

By January 2017, St. Louis Outlet Mall was considered by many news outlets and locals as a dead mall. It was reported that many vacant storefronts were being covered up by colorful curtains, while Cabela's, alongside other anchors, blocked off their interior entrances. In May 2017, it was reported that a local photographer of 13 News Now, Joshua Bishop, visited the mall on a Tuesday afternoon and captured photos of the nearly-abandoned mall, stating that no one was playing in the playground or getting movie tickets, as well as calling the "ghost-town" mall a "shadow of its former self". By late December 2017, only 48.4% of the mall's leasable space was occupied. Shoppers focused more heavily on competitors, such as Saint Louis Galleria. Regal Cinemas closed permanently on December 18, 2018, due to financial problems.

==== Maintenance issues ====
Reports indicate that Namdar aggressively cut expenses upon purchasing the mall in 2016. This fits a documented pattern of neglect seen at other Namdar properties, such as Pittsburgh Mills, which faced millions in fines for potholes and structural decay.

On May 24, 2019, Namdar Realty Group announced the permanent closure of the mall and sent the remaining tenants an eviction notice giving them 30 days to vacate the building. St. Louis Mills closed in June 2019, with the exception of Cabela's. Hope Baptist Church and Midwest Clearance Centers filed a lawsuit for breach of contract, alleging Namdar "refused" to perform routine cleaning, landscaping, and maintenance in common areas to deliberately blight the property. Other tenants reported persistent rodent infestations and plumbing failures that were never resolved despite repeated repair requests.

=== 2017–present: Redevelopment ===
==== POWERplex STL ====
In 2017, Dan Buck of Big Sports Properties planned for a sports complex in Chesterfield, but the proposal was rejected. By July 12, 2018, the developers turned to the failing mall, with public planning becoming official. On September 6, 2018, the updated proposal, alongside a $5.6 million loan for public funding to "jumpstart" construction, was approved by the Hazelwood City Council to transform the mall into a sports complex called POWERplex STL.

By 2020, POWERplex began operating in approximately 130,000 to 150,000 square feet (12,000 to 14,000 m^{2}) of existing mall space, hosting volleyball (in the former Ross Dress for Less space), softball (in the former Sears Outlet space), baseball, pickleball, and ice hockey. The venue kept the building open to the public even though it no longer functioned as a retail center.

==== Hazelwood Business Park ====
In late November 2022, Big Sports Properties sold 50% of the building to Industrial Commercial Properties LLC (ICP). Big Sports Properties had plans to expand POWERplex STL into a $55 million to $60 million mixed-use development that would make Hazelwood Business Park and POWERplex STL connected, creating a 24/7 environment. The project would include an 18-court volleyball venue, seven beach volleyball courts (five indoors), eight outdoor soccer fields and a gymnastics training center. The entertainment zone would include an 84,000-square-foot (7,800 m^{2}) event center for basketball, dance, cheer, and wrestling, a 105,000-square-foot (9,800 m^{2}) amusement zone featuring go-karts and mini-golf, micro-brewery, 12 restaurants and eateries, and a golf simulator bar. Ameren Corporation planned to install solar panels to power the venue and nearby homes. However, these plans were canceled on April 20, 2023, due to leasing difficulties with ICP.

Following the cancellation of the plans, POWERplex STL closed its doors on May 1, 2023. A $30 million renovation to convert the facility led to the building's interior being completely gutted, alongside a full repainting of both the interior and exterior to white. The facility's fire sprinkler and HVAC systems were replaced because the original infrastructure, which had been in place since the mall's construction in the early 2000s, was considered outdated and insufficient for a modern warehouse conversion. The original sprinkler system was replaced with an ESFR (Early Suppression Fast Response) fire suppression system.

The building opened as the Hazelwood Business Park in 2023. IDI Distributors was the first tenant at Hazelwood Business Park, signing a lease in October 2023 to occupy approximately 27,000 to 30,000 sq ft (2,500 to 2,800 m^{2}) of the former mall interior except for Cabela's and Ice Zone. IDI relocated its St. Louis operations from Maryland Heights to the new site, marking the first time one of its 65 national locations operated out of a converted retail space. The tenant had its grand opening on January 24, 2024, involving a ribbon-cutting ceremony.

Dive Bomb Industries followed as a major tenant in July 2024, signing a 128,000-square-foot (11,900 m^{2}) lease for its headquarters, operations center, and a retail outlet at Hazelwood Business Park.

== Attractions ==
=== Ice Zone ===
Interior of Ice Zone (December 2016)

Ice Zone (also styled iceZone) is a 1,200-seat indoor ice arena connected to the mall's Northwest section. The arena is open to the public for skating, figure skating, local youth, high school, and adult hockey teams. It served as the official practice facility of the St. Louis Blues hockey team until relocating to the newly built Centene Community Ice Center. It offered free bleacher seating for fans during practice sessions.

=== Former attractions ===
==== NASCAR SpeedPark ====
Neighborhood 4 concourse. Entrance to the former NASCAR SpeedPark (left) (December 2016)

The NASCAR SpeedPark included an indoor/outdoor go-kart race track and sometimes featured appearances by NASCAR drivers such as Kevin Harvick, who met with fans and signed autographs. The attraction eventually closed permanently.

==== Skate park ====
FutureSk8/Earth Surf (December 2016)

The ESPN X Games Skate Park opened with the mall in 2003; however, the mall lacked the proper copyright agreement to use the ESPN name with the park, which led to its renaming to the St. Louis Mills Skate Park in mid-2005. The park then closed in late 2006 and remained closed until 2007, when a new sponsor, Woodward, announced that they would take ownership. Plans for that fell through in late 2007, and the park remained closed until it was reopened with a new sponsor as Plan Nine in April 2009.

Following the mall's sale to Namdar Realty Group, the skate park was taken over by new management on July 1, 2016, and rebranded as FutureSk8/Earth Surf. The park closed permanently in 2017, and never reopened.

== Gallery ==
Exterior of Cabela's (October 2010)

Sears Outlet storefront (December 2016)

Ross Dress for Less storefront with original Circuit City red accents (December 2016)

Vacant food court stalls (December 2016)

Ice Zone entrance (December 2016)

== See also ==
- Chapel Hill Mall – a notable mall in Akron, Ohio that was also acquired and converted by ICP into the Chapel Hill Business Park
- Forest Fair Mall – formerly Cincinnati Mills, demolished in 2026
