= Georgetown Park =

Mixed-use in Washington, D.C.

Coordinates: 38°54′16.78″N 77°3′49.5″W

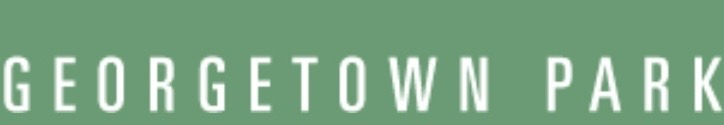

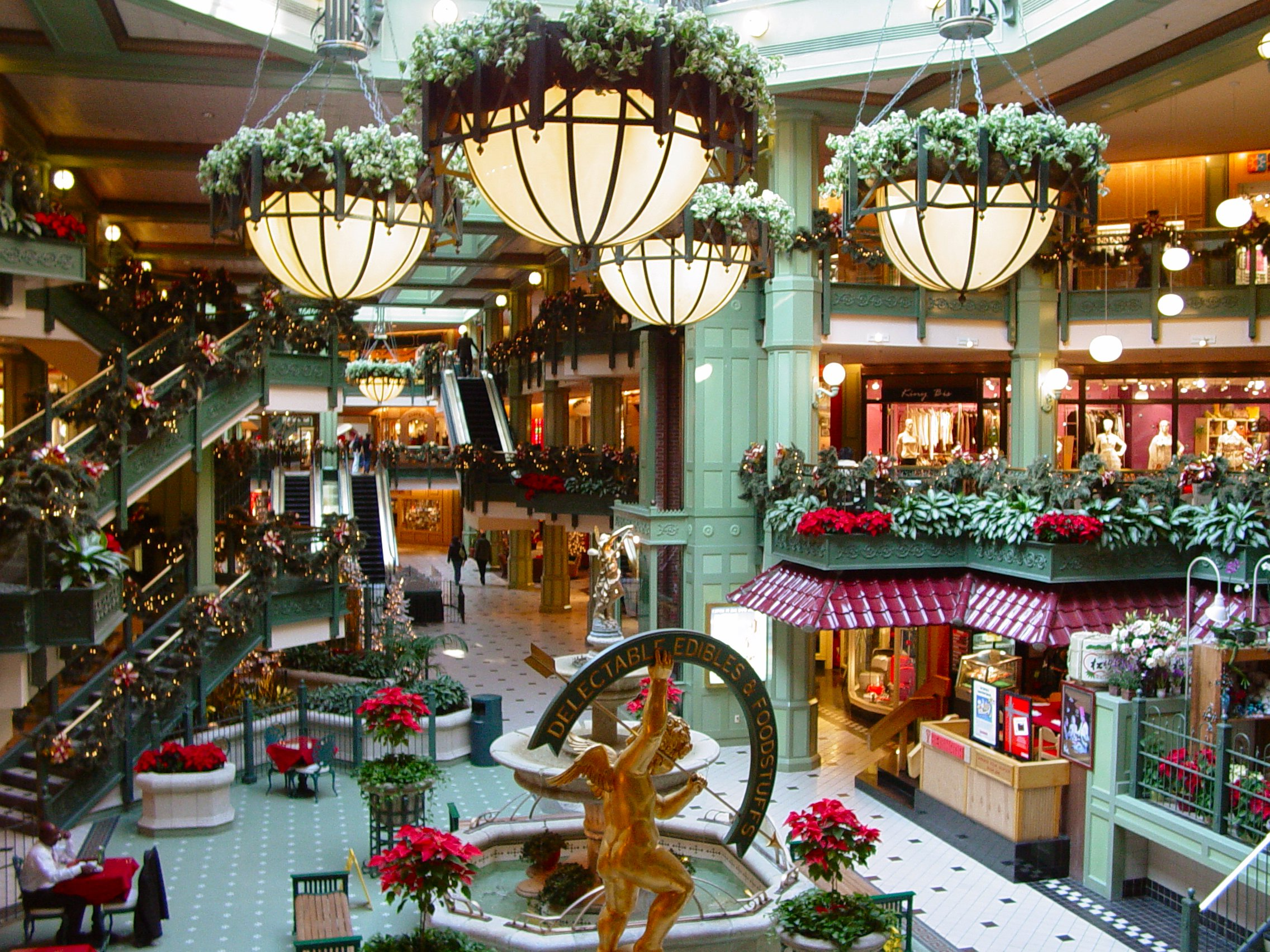
- Interior view (December 2006)
- Former names: The Shops at Georgetown Park (1981–2012)

General information
- Type: Mixed-use
- Location: Washington, D.C., United States, 3222 M Street NW, 20007
- Opening: September 27, 1981; 45 years ago
- Renovated: 2012–2015
- Closed: September 4, 2012; 14 years ago (as The Shops)
- Demolished: 2012–2013 (mall interior only)
- Owner: Jamestown L.P.
- Operator: Jamestown L.P.

Technical details
- Floor count: 3

Design and construction
- Developer: Georgetown Park Associates LLC
- Main contractor: Donohoe Construction Company

Renovating team
- Renovating firm: Vornado Realty Trust; Angelo, Gordon & Co.
- Main contractor: DAVIS Construction

Other information
- Number of stores: approx. 15 after renovations (130+ at peak)
- Number of anchors: 1
- Parking: Georgetown Park Parking
- Public transit: at Foggy Bottom-GWU (via bus routes A58, C85, D80, and D82)

Website
- www.georgetownpark.com

Georgetown Park is a mixed-use development and condominium complex in the Georgetown historic district of Washington, D.C.. The Shops at Georgetown Park was located at 3222 M Street, NW. In 2012 through 2015, the shopping center received an $80 million renovation.

== History ==
=== Background ===
Parts of the structure predate 1838 when it was used as a tobacco warehouse that opened up directly onto the Chesapeake and Ohio Canal. In the 1850s, the building was purchased by John E. Reeside and Gilbert Vanderwerken and converted into stables for their omnibus line. The building continued to be used as stables for the first horsecar line, the Washington and Georgetown Railroad. It was later converted into a machine shop for streetcars. The parts of the building that face the canal and the facade of the M Street entrance remain from those earlier periods. After the demise of Washington's streetcars in 1962, the building served as the United States Defense Communications Annex E before being converted to its current use.

=== 1975–1981: Development and opening ===
In 1975, Donohoe Construction Company—in a joint venture with Western Development Corporation—acquired the historic site to develop as a combined shopping and housing complex, known as The Shops at Georgetown Park. The project involved preserving the 100-plus year old facade on Wisconsin Avenue; building a 300-space underground parking garage into solid rock; and adding superstructure to the 10-foot (3.0 m) thick, 35-foot (11 m) high canal wall. Upscale features of the building included wood-floored hallways, a block-long skylight with cast-iron braces, brass and glass elevators, and hand-built oak kiosks. Construction costs came to $50 million for the retail center, $25 million for the condominiums, and $20 million for store interiors and fixtures.

The Canal House opened as the first phase of the project in 1980, with a Conran's homegoods store topped by 35 condominiums. At opening of the second phase on September 27, 1981, the "shopping park" had 100 stores and 128 condominiums. Original stores included the first East Coast branch of Abercrombie & Fitch, a 16,000-square-foot (1,500 m^{2}) branch of Garfinckel's, Ann Taylor, and Scan Furniture. Among the stores opening Washington branches were Davisons of Bermuda, a women's high-fashion shop from Miami; La Vogue, a Richmond-based women's wear store; Le Sac, a New Orleans–based boutique; Senor David, a New YorkNew York retailer of Italian menswear; a Linea Pitti tailor shop; Mark Cross, the leather goods store; and Godiva Chocolatier. The shopping park was deliberately designed not to have a major anchor store.

=== 1998–2014: Decline and mall closure ===
In 1998, Georgetown Park Associates—an affiliate of Western Development Corporation-sold the property to a company controlled by AEW Capital Management but retained a "right of first offer" to repurchase the mall. Anthony Lanier of EastBanc, Inc., another developer, claimed Miller sold that right to EastBanc in 1998 in exchange for a 7.5% stake in the mall. Miller claimed the right had expired in May 2002. EastBanc sued Western in March 2006, and Western moved to repurchase the property on its own in March 2007, suing EastBanc and Lanier personally for malicious filing.

Chez Mama-San and Sharper Image closed in 2007 and June 2008, respectively. On September 10, 2008, Bloomingdale's announced plans to open a three-level, 82,000-square-foot (7,600 m^{2}) anchor store at The Shops by August 2011. The store was to be modeled after the chain's concept store in New York's SoHo neighborhood to carry select contemporary men's and women's apparel. With this announcement, Western believed Georgetown Park would become "the highest fashion and trend center in the whole Washington area"; however, the deal fell through in the summer of 2009 due to the ongoing legal dispute with EastBanc. In the fall of that year, Western defaulted on a loan worth at least $70 million, and the property went into foreclosure. In February 2010, only 47 independent stores were still in operation. The vacancy rate had risen to 56% by April 2010.

=== 2010–2020: Redevelopment as Georgetown Park ===
In June 2010, the property was purchased out of foreclosure by Vornado Realty Trust and investment firm Angelo, Gordon & Co. for $61 million. Following the sale, Vornado began plans to redevelop the failing mall, and in September 2011, they began forcing remaining tenants out and refusing to renew leases. Historic independent boutiques and specialty shops were pushed out in massive waves. On September 4, 2012, The Shops at Georgetown Park was officially closed from the public, and was slated for heavy interior demolition. The redevelopment would significantly reduce the number of tenants from over 130 at its peak to just 15, and only a small handful of businesses with exclusive exterior access remained.

Georgetown Park had a grand reopening in the spring of 2013, adding discount retailers which continued to open throughout January 2014. This included HomeGoods, DSW Designer Shoe Warehouse and TJ Maxx. Instead of trying to pull people inside the shopping center or compete with high-fashion boutiques, many of the new stores had exclusive exterior entrances, and the building's floor plan was updated to feature large-format tenants. In November 2013, H&M opened in the center, and was the first location in the U.S. to sell home goods. The general contractor of the renovation was DAVIS Construction.

In February 2014, Pinstripes Bowling & Bocce, a bowling venue and restaurant, had its grand opening. Vornado Realty Trust put the center up for sale in May 2014. Jamestown L.P. of Atlanta, Georgia acquired the center in August 2014 for $272.5 million, and renovations were finished at a cost of $80 million. The name has since been simplified to Georgetown Park. Forever 21 opened at the center in January 2015 at 10:00 a.m. EST. Forever 21 later expanded in April 2016, taking over the former H&M space.

In October 2019, Forever 21 announced that it would close over 180 stores nationwide after filing for Chapter 11 bankruptcy. The Georgetown Park location was included in the mass closure. Washington Sports Club (WSC) closed its doors in June 2020, following the COVID-19 pandemic.

=== 2020–present ===
In mid-August 2021, Jamestown filed a historic preservation application detailing a massive conversion that would turn over 128,000 square feet (11,900 m^{2}) of upper-level retail space into roughly 166 residential units.

In July 2022, the non-profit arts group Capital Fringe took over the abandoned Forever 21 space (as well as the former DSW and Washington Sports Club footprints) to construct small, 51-seat pop-up indie theaters for the Capital Fringe Festival. Zoning was approved to turn long-vacant, windowless below-grade retail space into a 125-unit self-storage facility, optimizing non-traditional commercial real estate that year. However, nothing has happened as of 2023. Uniqlo was announced to take over the former J.Crew space on April 30, 2025.

== See also ==
- Executive Branch (club)
- List of shopping malls in the United States
- National Place Building
- Gallery Place (shopping center)
