= Mazza Gallerie =

Defunct mall in Friendship Heights, D.C.

Coordinates: 38.9597°N 77.0857°W

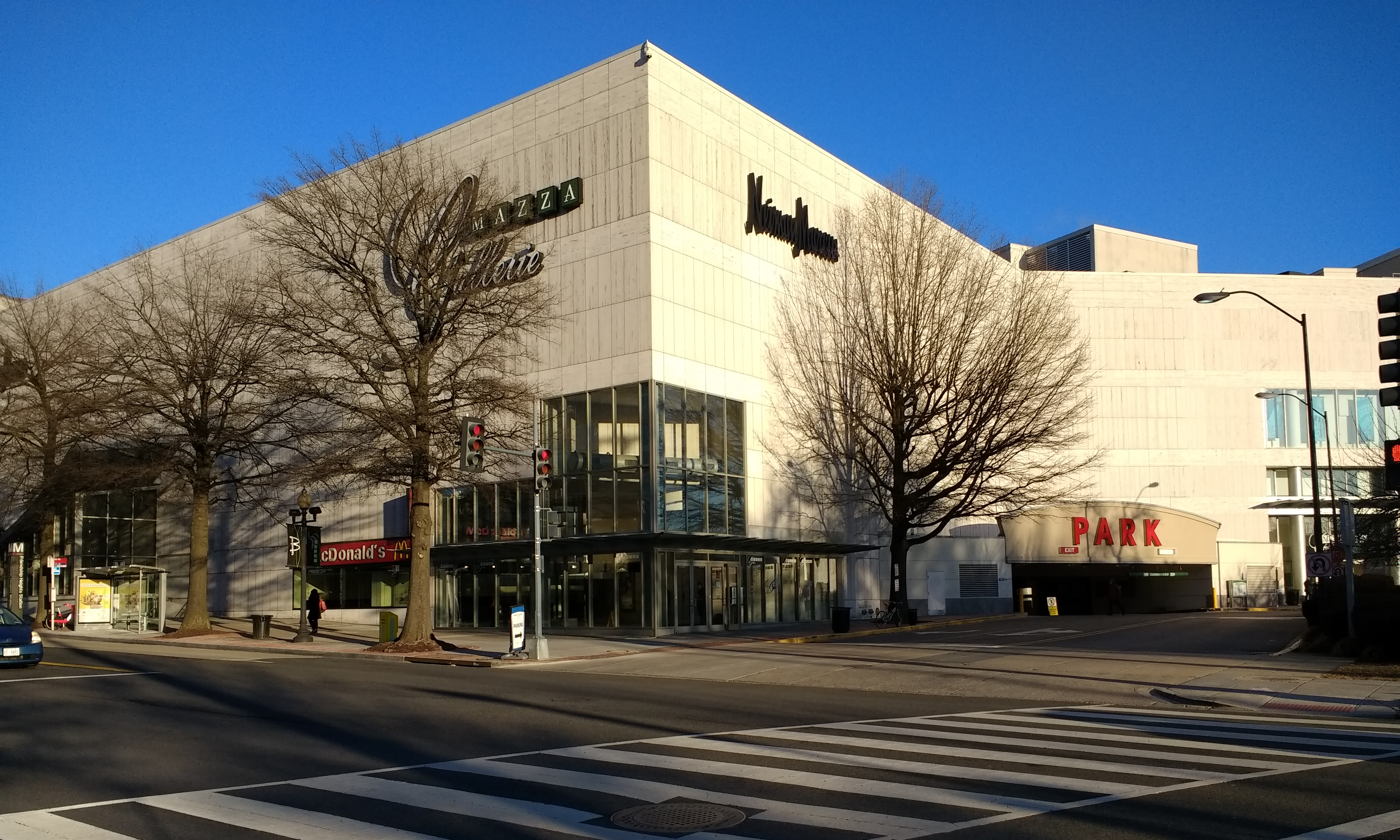
- Location: Washington, D.C. and Chevy Chase, Maryland, United States
- Opened: November 1977; 49 years ago
- Closed: December 24, 2022; 3 years ago
- Demolished: March 31, 2023
- Developer: Herbert S. Miller and Olga Mazza; Neiman Marcus
- Owner: Tishman Speyer
- Num. of anchor tenants: 3 (2 open, 1 vacant)
- Floor area: 300,000 square feet (28,000 m^{2})
- Floors: 4

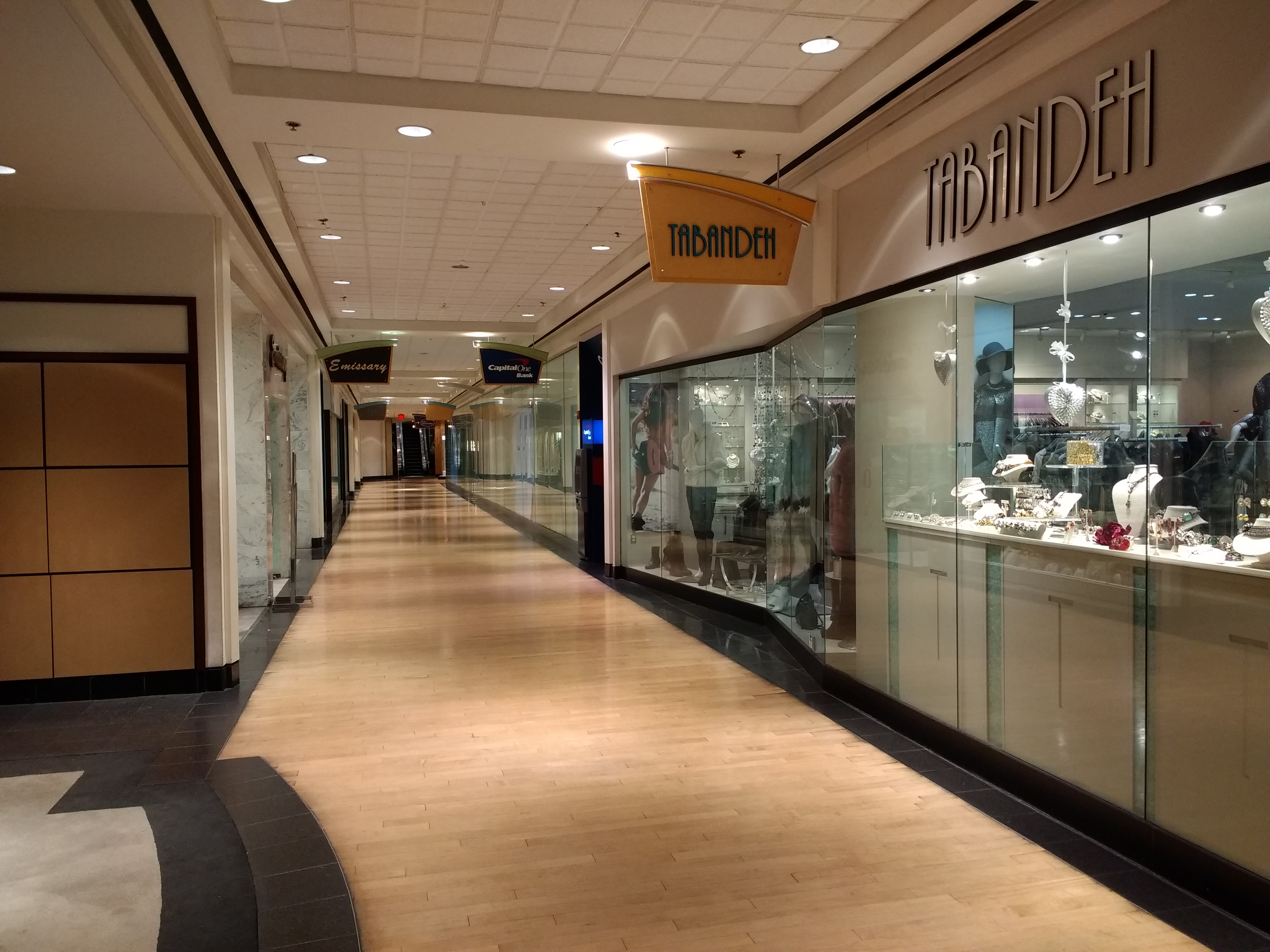
Interior

Mazza Gallerie was an upscale shopping mall located along Wisconsin Avenue in the Friendship Heights neighborhood of northwest Washington, D.C. at the Maryland border. Opened in 1977, it had 300,000 square feet (28,000 m^{2}) of retail space on three levels, a parking garage, and a direct connection to the Friendship Heights station of the Washington Metro. The last retail business closed in December 2022. The building was partially demolished in 2023 and rebuilt as Mazza, a 6-story apartment building, with retail on the ground floor.

The mall was named after Louise Mazza, whose daughter Olga inherited the land before it was developed. When the family sold the property, they attached a covenant requiring any future development to be called Mazza and to display a picture of Louise Mazza.

== History ==
It was an early project of Herbert S. Miller's Western Development Corporation, which was spun-off in 1994 as The Mills Corporation. Miller assembled a deal with property owner Olga Mazza and Neiman Marcus owner Stanley Marcus to build the development; Olga wanted an office building named after her mother and Miller wanted a residential component, but neither were approved. The developers envisioned the 60-store mall as the anchor for a new upscale shopping district: Washington's version of Fifth Avenue or Rodeo Drive. A retail corridor had already been established with the opening of a freestanding Woodward & Lothrop department store in 1950, followed by Lord & Taylor (1959) and Saks Fifth Avenue (1964) nearby, and a stop on the Metro Red Line had been approved in 1973.

Construction difficulties and labor disputes delayed construction of the $25 million project. The mall finally opened in November 1977, almost four years behind schedule. The anchor stores were Neiman Marcus and Raleigh Haberdasher. The delays had contributed to vacancies, as merchants could not plan for a firm opening date, and many retailers chose to open locations instead in White Flint Mall north of Bethesda. Traffic caused by the also-delayed construction of the Metro discouraged patrons from visiting the area. The poor early performance of the center contributed to a reputation as a "troubled" shopping center.

The mall was sold in 1982 to a group that included the Prudential Insurance Co. The entire Raleigh's chain went out of business in 1992, and their anchor store was replaced by Filene's Basement in 1993.

In June 1997, a group headed by Daniel McCaffery, who owned the Friendship Centre development across Wisconsin Avenue, acquired the mall for $28 million and spent a further $30 million on renovations as part of a de-malling project that opened up the marble block exterior with new windows, and added better lighting and additional entrances. The project was financed by Security Capital Group, which was acquired by General Electric in 2001. In September 2000, a 25,000 sq ft Saks Fifth Avenue Men's Store opened in the mall, as an additional anchor.

Among the added venues were a General Cinemas theatre and a restaurant, The R Room, owned by General Cinemas but operated by the restaurant division of Neiman Marcus. It closed in December 2000. Another restaurant, Rock Creek, operated in the restaurant space from 2007 to 2009. In June 2004, Teachers Insurance and Annuity Association of America (TIAA) acquired the mall from General Electric for $77 million.

Ashkenazy Acquisition Corporation, led by Ben Ashkenazy, acquired the mall from TIAA for $78 million in January 2017. By then, the Friendship Heights shopping district had been declining overall, as merchants closed or moved to the CityCenterDC district in downtown Washington, which opened in 2014, and as part of the general trend dubbed the "retail apocalypse." The COVID-19 pandemic in Washington, D.C. accelerated these effects. In August 2020, the closure of the Neiman Marcus store was announced and Annaly Capital Management acquired the property via foreclosure. In February 2021, the closing of the AMC Theatres was announced.

Tishman Speyer acquired the property in May 2021 for $52 million with plans to redevelop it into 350 apartments and 26,000 square feet (2,400 m^{2}) of retail space.

The last retail business in the mall, TJ Maxx, and the mall itself permanently closed on December 24, 2022.

The mall was partially demolished in March 2023, retaining the 4 stories of underground parking and a significant amount of structural framing from the mall. A new 6-story complex, named Mazza, was constructed at the site, containing 330 apartments and 90,000 square feet of retail. In August 2025, TJ Maxx became the first retailer to open in the new structure.

== Gallery: Construction of new Mazza Gallerie, 2024 ==
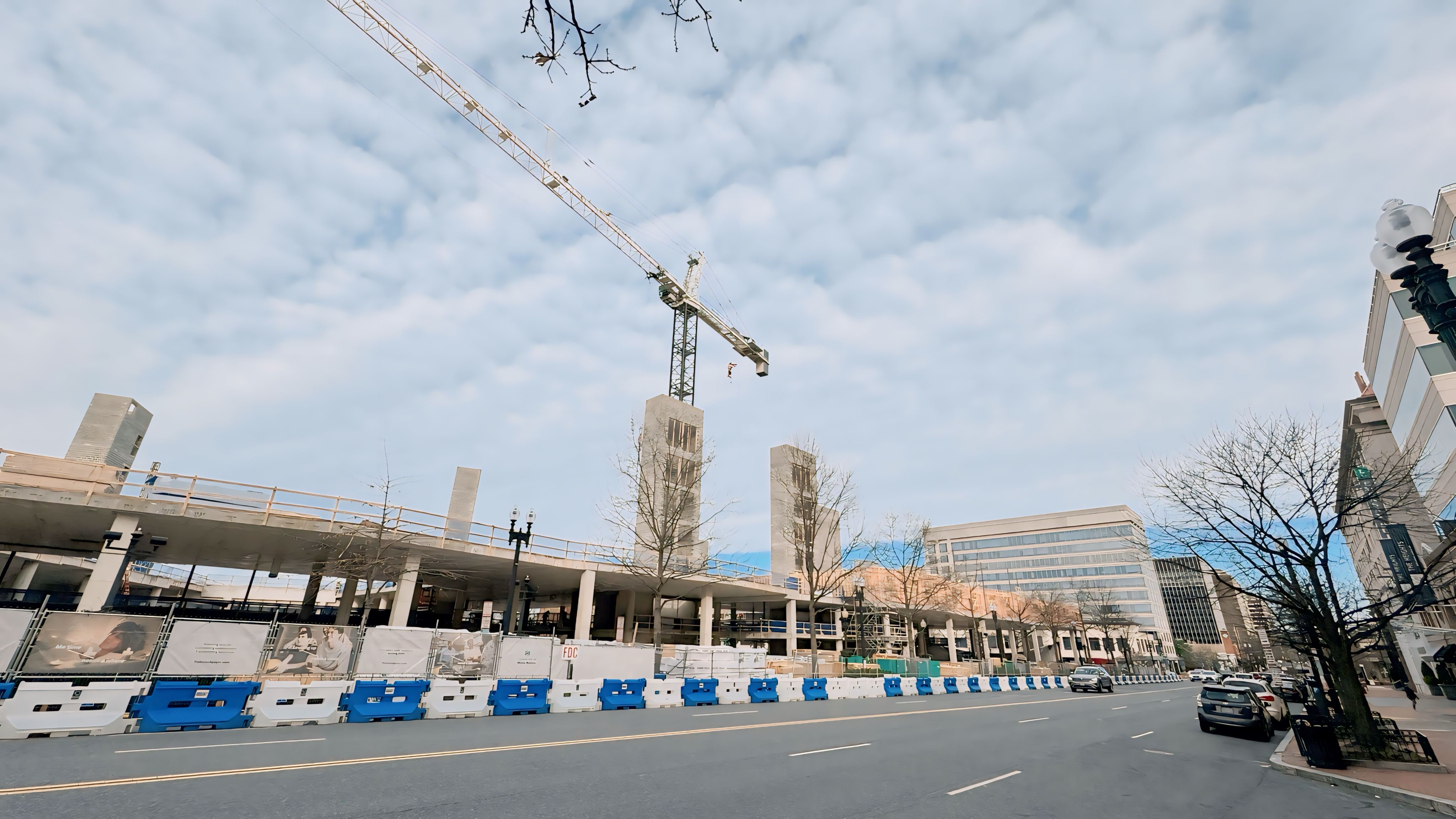

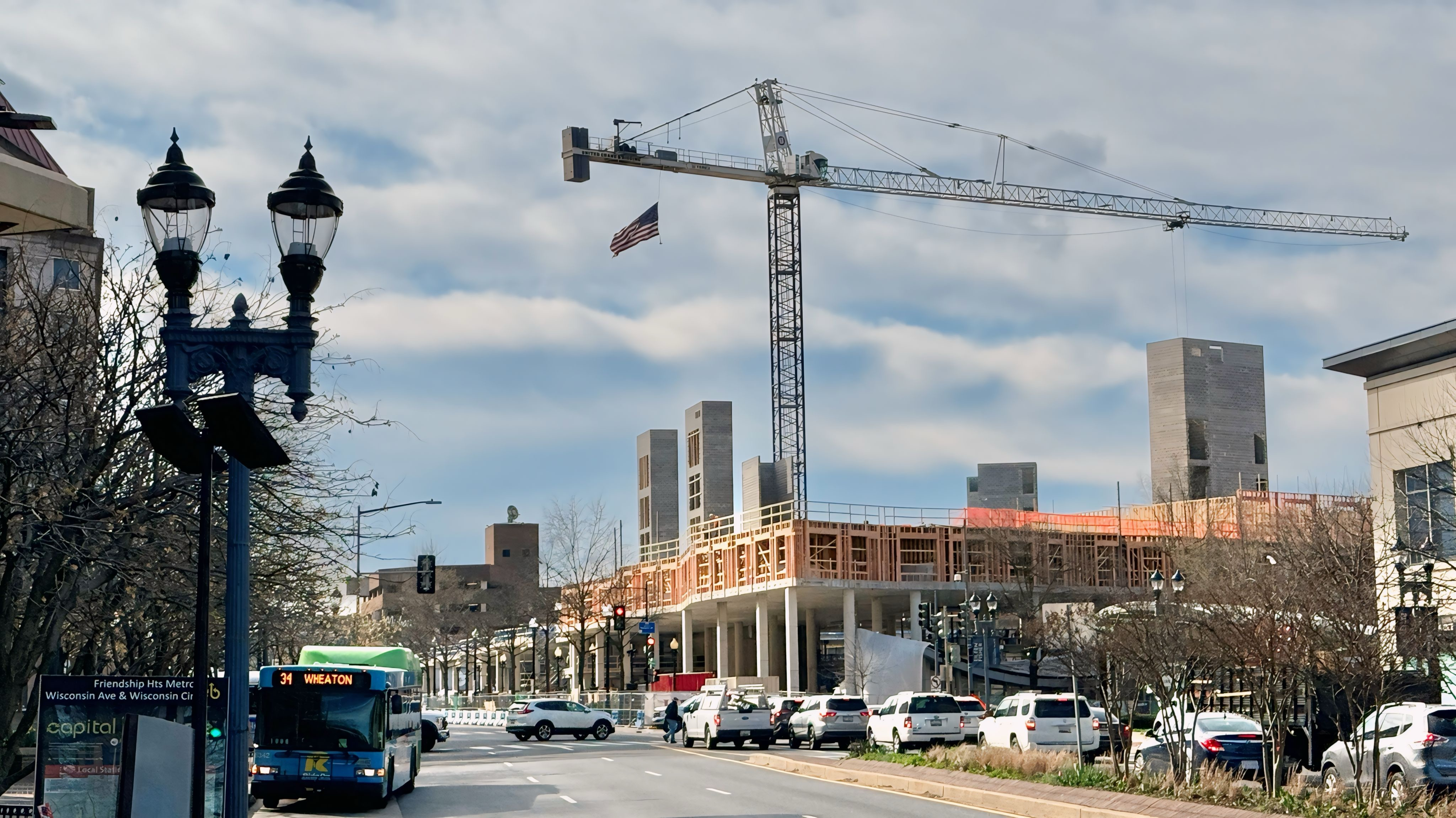

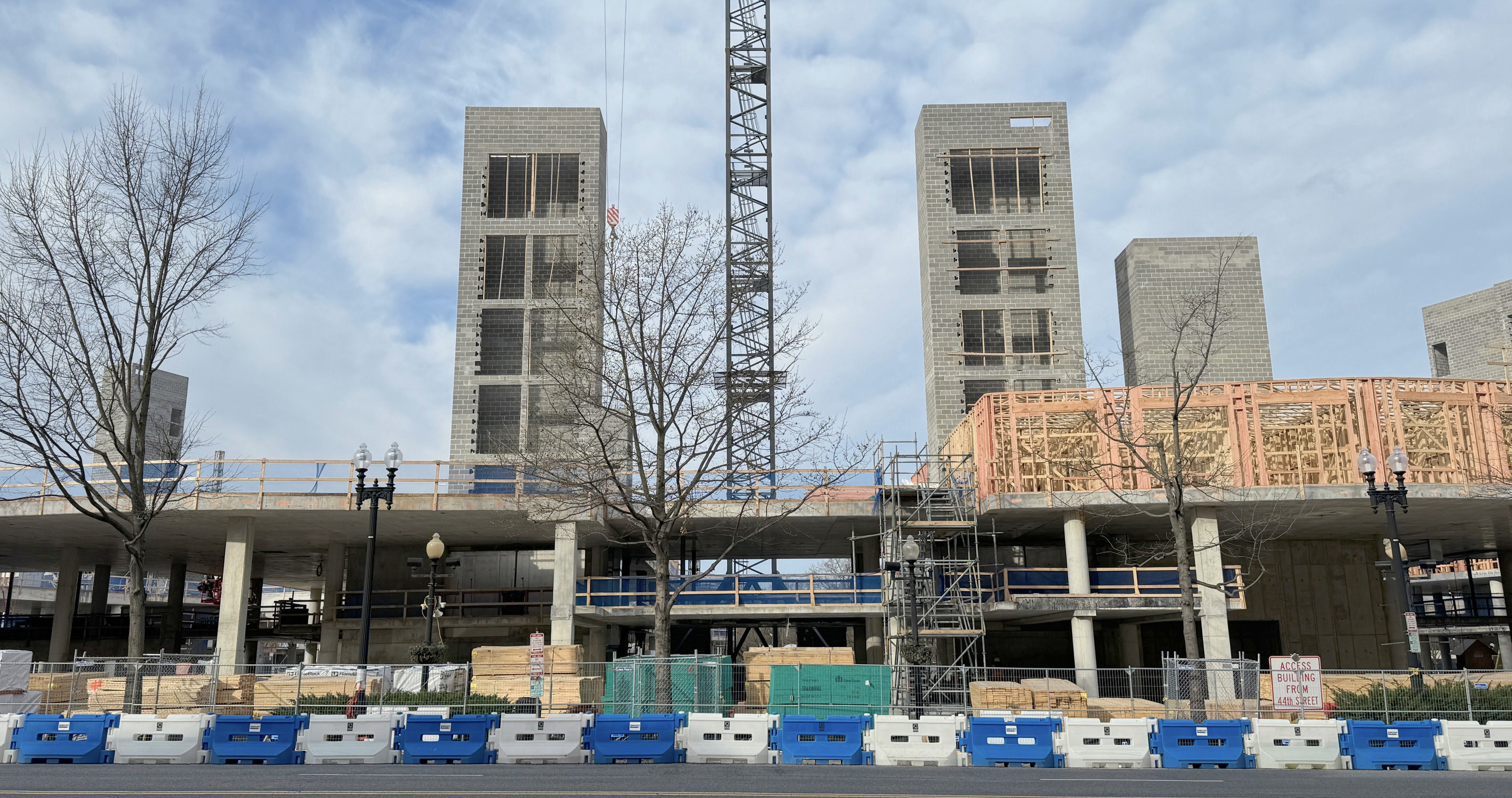

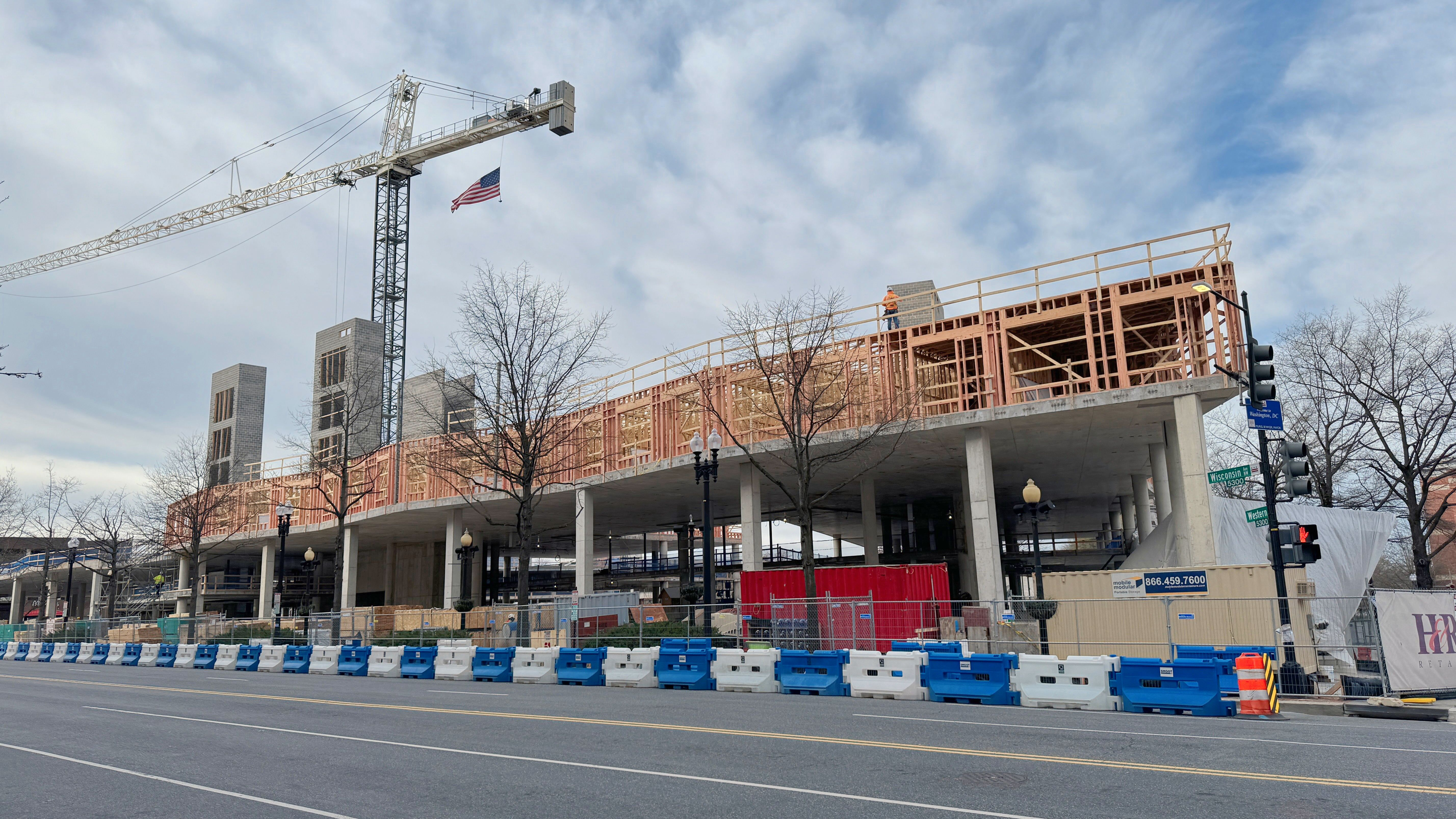

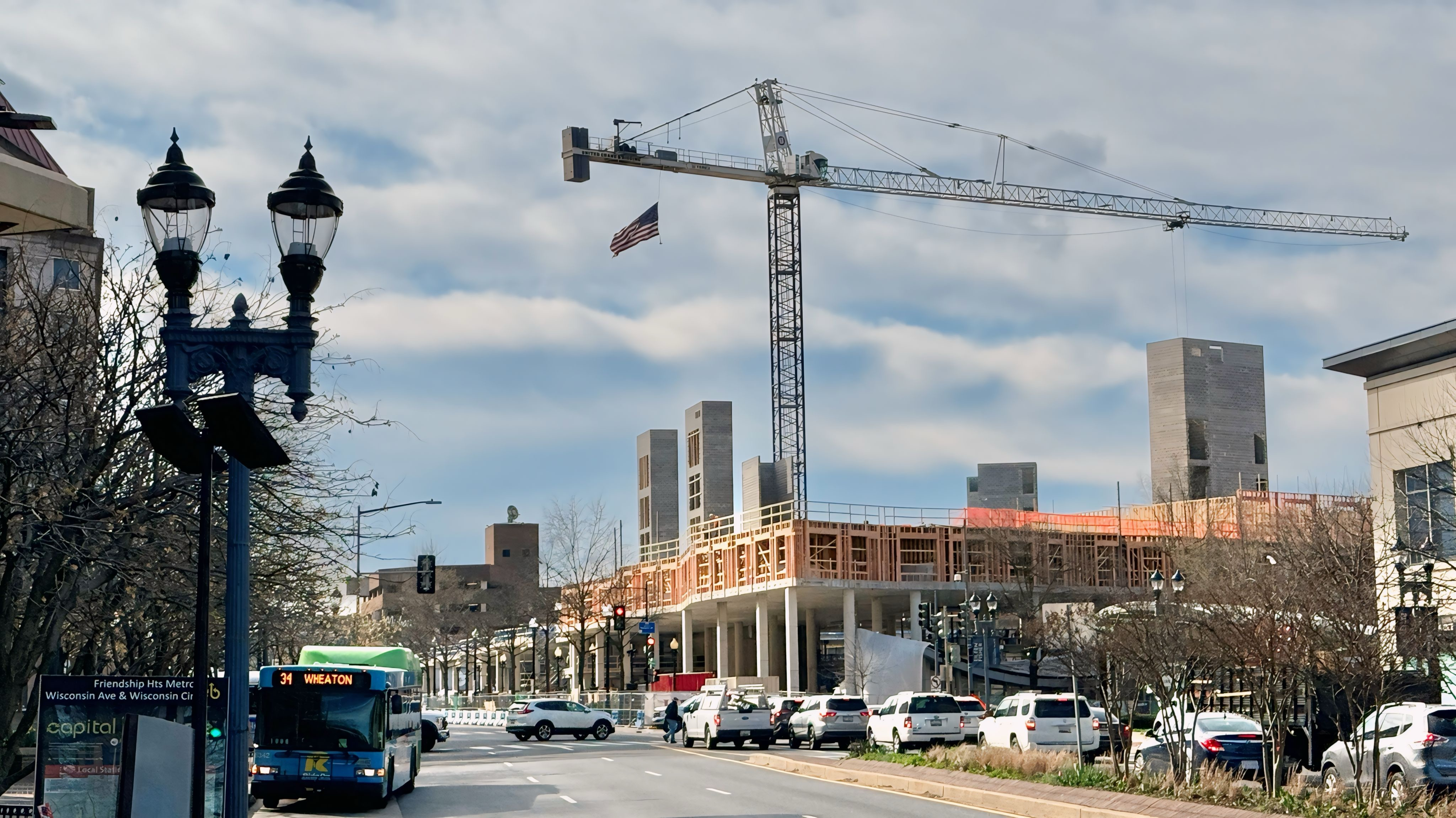
