= The Outlets at Orange =

Shopping center in suburban Los Angeles, California, U.S.

Coordinates: 33°46′58″N 117°53′35″W

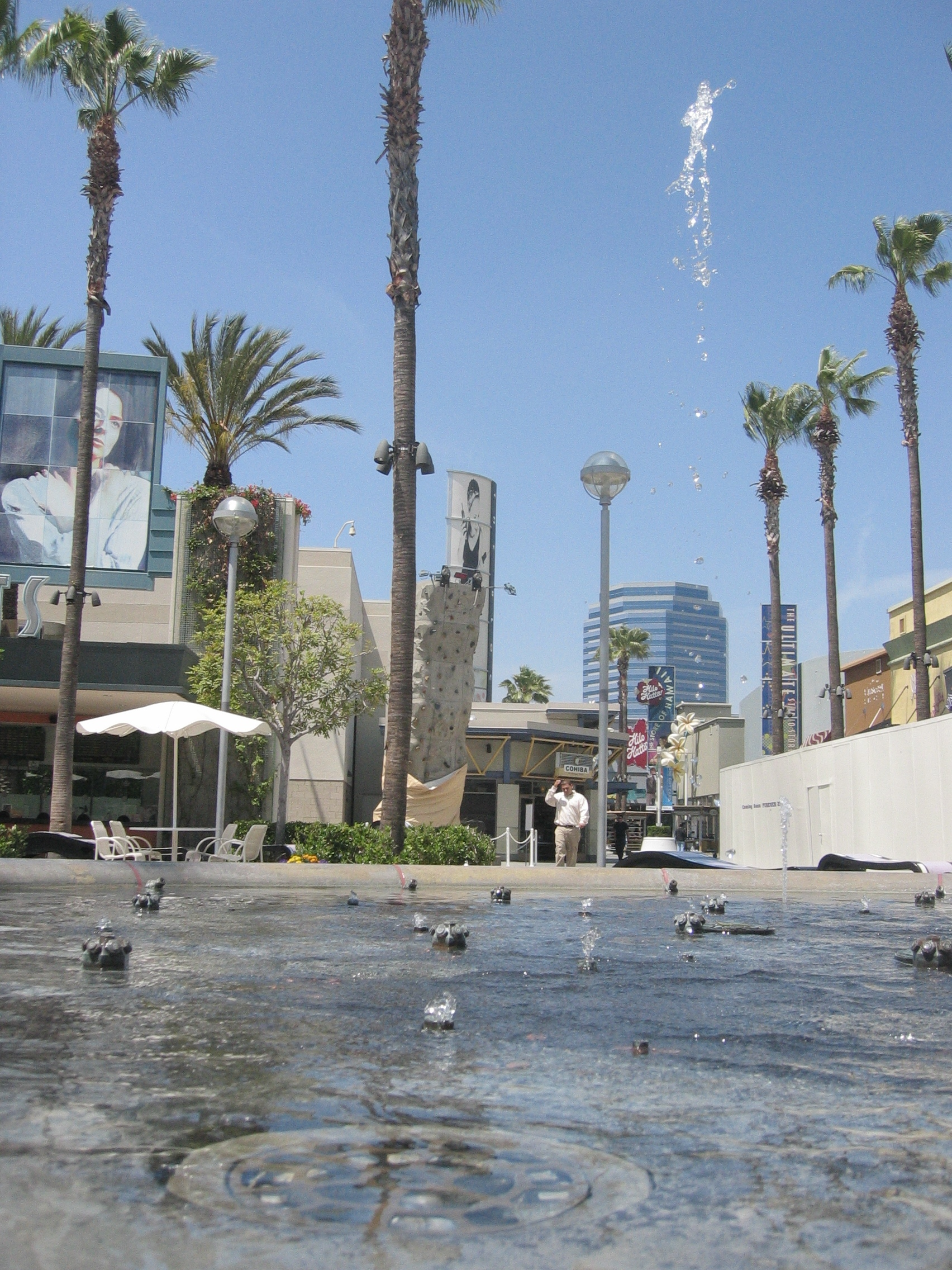
- A fanciful water fountain at the mall (May 2007)
- Location: Orange, California, United States
- Address: 20 West City Boulevard
- Opened: November 19, 1998; 27 years ago
- Previous names: City Mills (planning); The Block at Orange (1998–2011)
- Developer: The Mills Corporation; KanAm Group
- Manager: Simon Property Group
- Owner: Simon Property Group
- Architect: D'Agistino Izzo Quirk
- Num. of stores: 115
- Num. of anchor tenants: 8
- Floor area: 866,948 square feet (81,000 m^{2})
- Website: www.simon.com/mall/the-outlets-at-orange/

The Outlets at Orange (former names The Block at Orange and The City Shopping Center) is an open-air outlet mall in the city of Orange, California, in northern Orange County developed by the Mills Corporation and now owned by Simon Property Group.

== History ==
=== The City ===
From 1970 to 1996, the site was home to an enclosed mall called The City Shopping Center, featuring anchor stores J. C. Penney and San Diego–based Walker Scott, which would in 1974 become a May Co. branch. It targeted middle income residents, office workers and visitors to nearby Disneyland. The City Shopping Center was the centerpiece of The City, an edge city mixed-use development; in or just outside the mall were two hotels, several office buildings, two movie theaters (City Center Theatres and UA the Movies), gym, three full-service restaurants and a pizzeria, Pepperoni square (owned by Larrys Pizza in Fullerton) which was sold and became Clubhouse Pizza: Sports and Games, a foreign currency exchange and a post office. The roads around the mall had "City" in their names because they were built as part of that complex.

Only two miles away, the small Santa Ana Fashion Square mall was renamed MainPlace/Santa Ana and vastly expanded, growing from one department store anchor (Bullock's) to three in September 1987 and business at The City started declining rapidly by the start of the 1990s. May Company opened a new store at MainPlace in May 1991 and closed its store at The City in July of that year. JCPenney, The City's other major anchor, closed in February 1995. The mall was closed and demolished in late 1996.

=== The Block at Orange ===
Mills purchased the site, originally considering converting the City mall to one of their Mills malls named "City Mills," but instead built an outdoor lifestyle center with outlets, restaurants, and entertainment facilities. The center's old slogan was The Block at Orange... It Ain't Square. It was Mills Corporation's first outdoor mall not to have the "Mills" name. The Block officially opened in November 1998.

Ron Jon Surf Shop closed in 2008 and was replaced by Neiman Marcus Last Call. Virgin Megastore, Hilo Hattie and Steve & Barry's closed in 2009. These anchors were replaced with Off Broadway Shoes, H&M, Thrill It Fun Center and Guitar Center. Borders closed in 2011 due to the chain's liquidation, and was replaced by Sports Authority, but Sports Authority at the mall was liquidated along with the rest of the company's stores starting May 18, 2016, due to Chapter 11 bankruptcy. Furniture & Beyond briefly occupied the former Sports Authority space but closed less than a year later. The mall has one of the few remaining Vans Skate Parks in the country, as most of the other skateparks closed or were sold to another brand in the early 2000s.

Like other Mills properties, The Block at Orange was acquired by the Simon Property Group in 2007.

=== The Outlets at Orange ===
In 2011, The Block at Orange was renamed The Outlets at Orange.

The Outlets at Orange underwent two phases of expansion on the east side of the mall. The first phase included a new Nordstrom Rack store which was completed in 2013. The second phase was completed in 2016 which included five new stores such as Gap Factory Store, Polo Ralph Lauren, and Orange County's first Bloomingdale's Outlet. The second phase was supposed to bring 12 new stores but only 5 came because stores such as Bloomingdale's wanted larger spaces.

Outlets at Orange was, for a long time, the only outlet mall in Orange County with the next nearest outlet malls being Citadel Outlets in Commerce, 23 miles away near Central Los Angeles. The Outlets at San Clemente opened in 2015, and though nine miles further away than Citadel, provided more significant competition as it took away Orange's status as the only outlet mall in Orange County.

The former Virgin Megastore was featured in Borat where Borat attempts to kidnap Pamela Anderson.
