= Gallery Place (shopping center) =

Mixed-use in Chinatown, Washington, D.C.

- Location: Washington, D.C., United States
- Coordinates: 38°53′56″N 77°01′18″W
- Address: 616 H Street NW, 20001
- Developer: Gallery Place Associates LLC
- Manager: MRP Realty; Cushman & Wakefield
- Owner: MRP Realty in a joint venture with Global Fund Investments
- Parking: Gallery Place Garage

Gallery Place is a small urban power center in Downtown Washington, D.C. in D.C.'s Chinatown and also in the F Street shopping district, the traditional downtown shopping and entertainment area. It is adjacent to Capital One Arena and the Gallery Place/Chinatown station of the Washington Metro rail is underneath the center. It measures 660,000 sq ft (61,000 m^{2}) of which 250,000 sq ft (23,000 m^{2}) is retail space; there is 220,000 sq ft (20,000 m^{2}) of office space and 192 condominiums. It opened in the fall of 2004, and was developed by Gallery Place Associates LLC, a firm that included Western Development Corporation and Akridge.

== History ==
=== Early 1970s – 1989: Original proposal ===
Planning for Gallery Place dates back to the early 1970s, where in 1973, the District of Columbia acquired a 120,838-square-foot site above the Gallery Place Metrorail station using federal funds from the Department of Housing and Urban Development. In November 1979, the Redevelopment Land Agency (RLA) selected Capital Landmark Associates (CLA) in to develop a $200 million mixed-use complex featuring offices, low-income housing, retail, a hotel, and entertainment spaces, all of which were for the purpose of supporting the Black business community and were planned by William Fitzgerald of The Fitzgerald Group. The project was known as Gallery Place.

However, in 1981, Fitzgerald and his partners were struggling to attract tenants and finance the project. That same year, CLA invested in $850,000 secure purchase of the land. Simultaneously, Fitzgerald announced that the London-based Trusthouse Forte would develop a 704-room luxury hotel on the site, with a projected opening in the fall of 1984. The original deadlines set by the RLA were extended throughout the fall of 1981, and the spring of 1982. However, Trusthouse Forte pulled out after the partnership was unable to announce any form of financing for the Gallery Place project. In February 1982, Fitzgerald announced that the project would be "right on schedule", arguing that they have not "caused any delays", but for the next two years, they have frequently went to D.C. redevelopment offices, never actually starting construction. In 1983, then-RLA Chairman Nira Long was frustrated with the consistent delays, stating to Fitzgerald that "we hope we never see you again."

Despite her complaint, the developers arrived before the board again in 1984 to ask for additional extensions. At that meeting, the RLA staff found that Capital Landmark was in default of its contract obligation, and therefore, was required to pay additional fees to allow for more contract extensions. However, the board granted Capital Landmark another extension, but under one condition: the buildings on the site Capital Landmark selected had to be demolished. As of 1989, documents released by the district showed this was the last extension ever granted on the contract. The contract required the partnership to pay $17 million to the property by May 14, 1985, but they failed to make the deadline and was denied additional extensions. After that, the RLA started to find another developer to partner with. The project has also been stalled due to the 1985 opening of the National Place Building, internal controversies over political favoritism tied to Mayor Marion Barry's administration, market oversupply of office space. As a result, the site remained empty by October 1989.

=== Early 1990s – 2004: Development and opening ===
By the early 1990s, Washington, D.C. experienced a critical financial decline. Population was reduced, people were unable to impose taxes on commuters, a large non-taxable property base, and government difficulties all contributed to a long-term decline in the health and vitality of the city. Economic investment did not exist, and the city's real estate market, both commercial and residential, weakened as the city quickly became an increasingly unrecommended place to live and work. Public needs were also neglected following this recession.

This led to the construction of the MCI Center, (Note: Now Capital One Arena.) announced in 1995 and had its grand opening in December 1997, which had the purpose of revitalizing the East End neighborhood, historically known as Chinatown. In 1995, the District of Columbia and the Washington Metropolitan Area Transit Authority (WMATA) collaborated to provide a 2.43 acres (0.98 ha) site above the Gallery Place-Chinatown Metro station to allow for new development. In October 1997, WMATA partnered with The John Akridge Company, led by John E. "Chip" Akridge III, Western Development Corporation, a local development firm led by Herbert S. Miller, and Williams Jackson Ewing Inc. (WJE), a company that included former executives of the Rouse Company: Jackson "Jackie" Ewing, famous for Faneuil Hall Marketplace, Michael Ewing, who directed the WJE firm on integrating retail into historical landmarks, and Roy Williams. The partnership was created for an integrated mixed-use complex with a focus on retail, offices, residential elements, and parking. A preliminary agreement with the developers was signed in 1998.

The District provided $73.65 million in tax increment financing (TIF) bonds issued in 2002 under the 1998 TIF Act, supported by incremental property and sales taxes from a designated area, along with $9 million in direct payments for tax waivers up to $7 million, alongside infrastructure updates. In July 2001, the new partnership successfully attracted tenants for the project, including AMC Entertainment, Inc. (which downsized its planned number of screens from 21 to 16-12), Jillian's Entertainment, and Chevys Fresh Mex. BB&T Corporation would develop a bank branch for the project. By December 1999, Gallery Place was now established to cost around $220 million, which began construction that year with an estimated completion of 2005.

In July 2003, Clyde's Restaurant Group signed a letter of intent to open a massive, 22,000-square-foot (2,000 m^{2}) flagship restaurant across two levels. Developers previewed that the space would feature a grand Victorian saloon theme, complete with a ground-floor raw bar and upstairs private dining rooms. Capital Restaurant Concepts was in active lease negotiations to secure a large, two-level space for a new location of Paolo's. This Italian concept was mapped out to sit directly adjacent to the MCI Center. Jillian's was forced to pull out of the project in May 2004 due to Chapter 11 bankruptcy, with most locations being rebranded as Dave & Buster's.

By September 13, 2004, Gallery Place was nearly completed.

=== 2006–2014: Early years ===
The shopping mall component of Gallery Place experienced early struggles. By 2006 through 2007, fashion concepts struggled to maintain the high foot traffic needed to offset the premium rent. Brands like United Colors of Benetton and its sister store Sisley eventually exited the complex after failing to meet sales expectations. However, by 2010, the complex featured Bed Bath & Beyond, Urban Outfitters, Ann Taylor Loft, and the Aveda Institute.

In June 2014, Western Development Corp., Cornerstone Real Estate Advisers and Akridge, operating as Gallery Place Associates LLC, sold their 50/50 shares in the commercial components of Gallery Place to the AFL-CIO's Building Investment Trust (BIT) and Canada-based Oxford Properties for $230 million. On December 6, 2019, it was announced that Bed Bath & Beyond would shutter.

=== 2020–present: Decline and updates to the Gallery Place complex ===
Lucky Strike Lanes closed permanently in May 2020. In June 2020, Washington Sports Club announced that it would close its doors amid the COVID-19 pandemic. Aveda Arts & Sciences Institute closed permanently in July 2020.

On December 28, 2020, Urban Outfitters closed permanently, leaving Regal Cinemas as the only anchor left. On January 19, 2023, it was announced that Regal Cinemas (operating as Regal Gallery Place 14) would close as part of a plan to close 39 theaters nationwide, which would leave the mall with no anchors left. However, the theater's decision to close was reversed in June of that year after finding a new lease.

Following a collapsed deal to move the teams to Virginia, D.C. secured a lease keeping Monumental Sports & Entertainment at Capital One Arena through 2050. The District is providing $515 million over three years to fund a complete state-of-the-art renovation. As part of this deal, Monumental is expanding its footprint directly into the adjacent Gallery Placebuilding to add practice facilities and newly programmed spaces. MRP Realty acquired Gallery Place from Oxford Properties for $39 million. In September 2025, Mayor Muriel Bowser moved forward with plans to seek a designer for Gallery Square, a signature transformation project stemming from the neighborhood's official task force. The District approved initial millions for the $35.7 million project to transform the National Portrait Gallery plaza into a European-style public square. The city is aiming to deliver this public space in tandem with the massive arena upgrades by 2027.

Riders using the Gallery Place-Chinatown Station have faced navigation detours at Entrance A (7th and F Street, NW). WMATA launched a full replacement of all four heavy-duty escalators. The phased project kept two escalators operational at all times and was slated for completion in April 2026.

== See also ==
- Georgetown Park
- Mazza Gallerie
