= The Mills Corporation =

Former American REIT mall developer

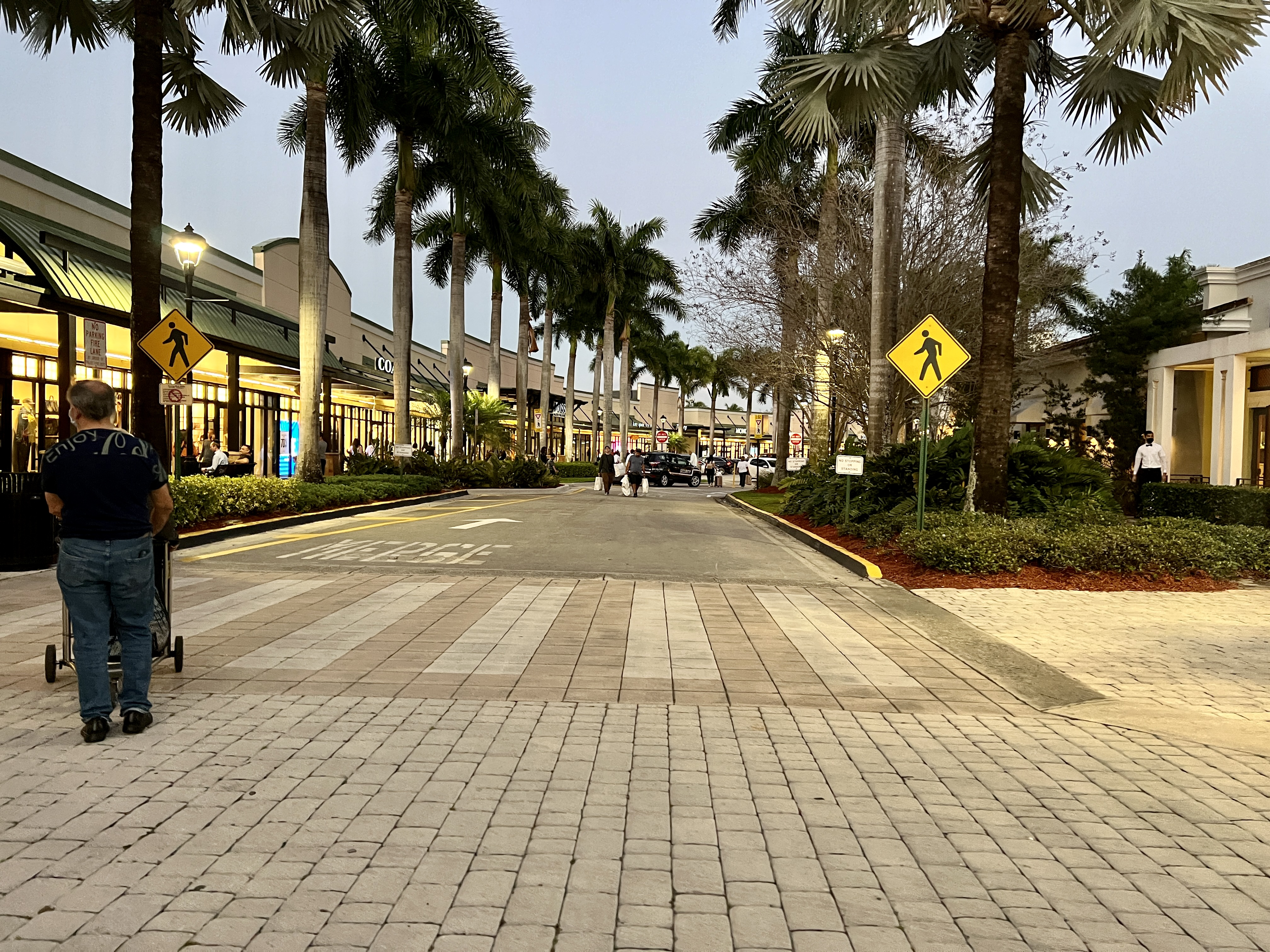
- Sawgrass Mills is the company's flagship property, and is one of the largest outlet malls in the U.S.
- Type: Subsidiary (1991–1994); Public (1994–2007); Division (2007–present)
- Traded as: NYSE: MLS
- Industry: REIT
- Predecessor: Western Development Corporation (Landmark Mills malls only)
- Founded: January 2, 1991; 35 years ago (spun-off on April 21, 1994)
- Founder: Herbert S. Miller
- Defunct: April 6, 2007; 19 years ago (as an independent firm)
- Fate: Financial difficulties and lawsuits, leading to an acquisition by Simon Property Group and Farallon Capital Management; Properties outside the U.S. sold to Ivanhoé Cambridge
- Successors: Simon Property Group (The Mills / Premium Outlets); Ivanhoé Cambridge
- Headquarters: Chevy Chase, Maryland
- Key people: Laurence C. Siegel (CEO, 1995–2006)
- Products: Shopping malls
- Owner: Western Development Corporation (1991–1994); Simon Property Group and Farallon Capital Management (2007–present)
- Parent: Simon Premium Outlets
- Website: themills.com at the Wayback Machine (archived December 3, 2003)

The Mills Corporation (stylized as THE MILLS) was a publicly-traded real estate investment trust headquartered in Chevy Chase, Maryland, that developed and operated super-regional shopping malls. "Landmark Mills" malls were typically built as large, single-floor facilities with a mixture of off-price retail and entertainment offerings, and themed "neighborhoods"– concourses intentionally color-coded to help shoppers navigate their malls. The company also had a sizeable portfolio of acquired properties, which tended to be smaller in scale.

Mills was formed in 1991 (went public in 1994) as a spin-off of founder Herbert S. Miller's Western Development Corporation, which continued operating privately in Washington, D.C. After Mills was split from Western Development, the company developed dozens of Landmark Mills malls, and partnered with various entertainment firms to license their names and brandings to attractions, particularly skate parks and speed parks. The company eventually expanded internationally with the developments of Madrid Xanadú and Vaughan Mills.

On April 3, 2007, following financial difficulties, the company was acquired by an investment group composed of Simon Property Group and Farallon Capital Management. At the time of the acquisition, the company operated 36 malls across the United States, 15 of which it had developed. Following the acquisition, Mills was reorganized into a division of Simon's Premium Outlets platform which manages the company's portfolio of indoor outlet malls, and has since acquired indoor outlet malls unaffiliated with the original company.

== History ==
=== Background ===
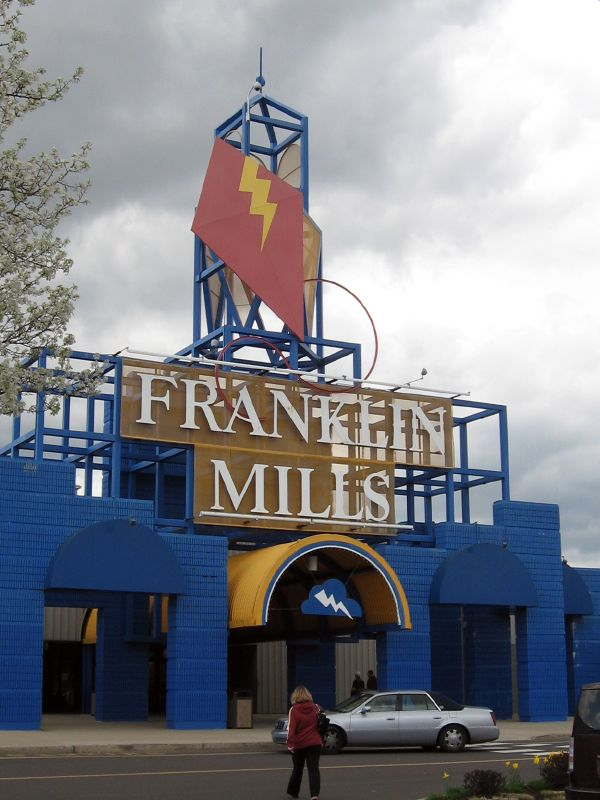
Franklin Mills kite entrance (April 2008)

In 1967, Herbert S. "Herb" Miller and Richard L. Kramer founded the Western Development Corporation, based in Washington, D.C.. Their first mall to use the Landmark Mills template was Potomac Mills in Prince William County, Virginia, which opened its first phase on September 19, 1985. Rather than relying on department stores, the Mills concept would combine off-price stores with factory outlets. Later, in 1986, Western acquired a former Treasury department store in Rolling Meadows, Illinois, which permanently closed in 1981. The company redeveloped the vacant space into Algonquin Mills. In December 1988, Western sold the mall to Aetna Life Insurance Company and The Tucker Companies, and it was renamed Meadows Town Mall.

Western later developed Franklin Mills in Philadelphia, Pennsylvania, which had its grand opening celebration on May 11, 1989, advertised as The Mall To End Them All. Western named and themed the mall after Benjamin Franklin, fulfilling Herb Miller's vision of "shoppertainment". Then, Sawgrass Mills in Broward County, Florida, and Gurnee Mills in Lake County, Illinois, opened in October 1990 and August 1991, respectively. Sawgrass Mills was a flagship property for Western, and their third Mills mall development, designed to be themed after and resemble an alligator as a nod to alligators being common native residents to the Miami/Fort Lauderdale metropolitan area. Gurnee Mills would follow as the fourth Mills mall and the final Mills-branded mall developed under Western.

=== 1991–1999: Foundation and early projects ===
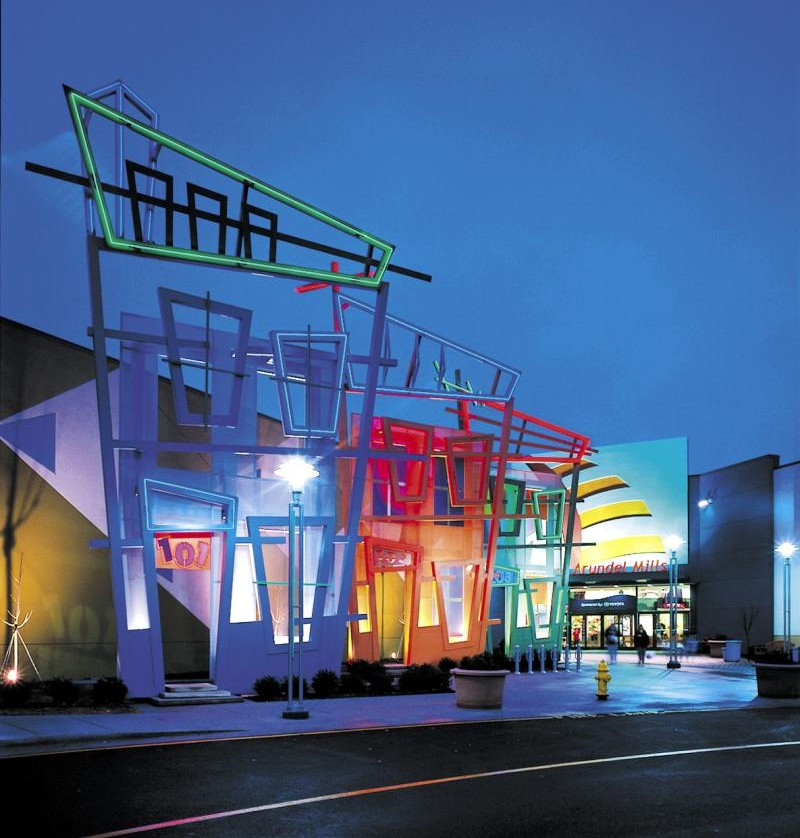
The Rowhouse Entry at Charm City Neighborhood 1 at night - Arundel Mills

In 1994, Western Development Corporation spun-off its four Mills-branded malls into a public, real estate investment trust development firm, known as the Mills Corporation, which was originally incorporated in 1991 as a private subsidiary. Laurence C. "Larry" Siegel joined Western in 1993, and became CEO of the Mills Corporation in March 1995.

In November 1996, Mills developed Ontario Mills near Los Angeles, California, which was the company's first mall designed abstractly and with a full oval "racetrack"-like design which followed into the rest of the company's built malls, including Grapevine Mills in the Dallas-Fort Worth metroplex, which opened to the public on October 30, 1997. Arizona Mills in Maricopa County would follow, opening in November 1997. Arizona Mills was developed and operated in partnership with Taubman Centers. Under Larry Siegel, the company aggressively shifted from traditional discount stores to entertainment anchors, such as AMC Theatres, Regal Cinemas, Vans Skatepark, Jillian's Entertainment, and GameWorks.

Originally planned as City Mills, the company debuted The Block at Orange in late November 1998, as their first outdoor mall to not use the "Mills" name. Sawgrass Mills was expanded with the addition of The Oasis, which opened on April 15, 1999, featuring restaurants and entertainment.

=== 1999–2006: Partnerships and expansion ===
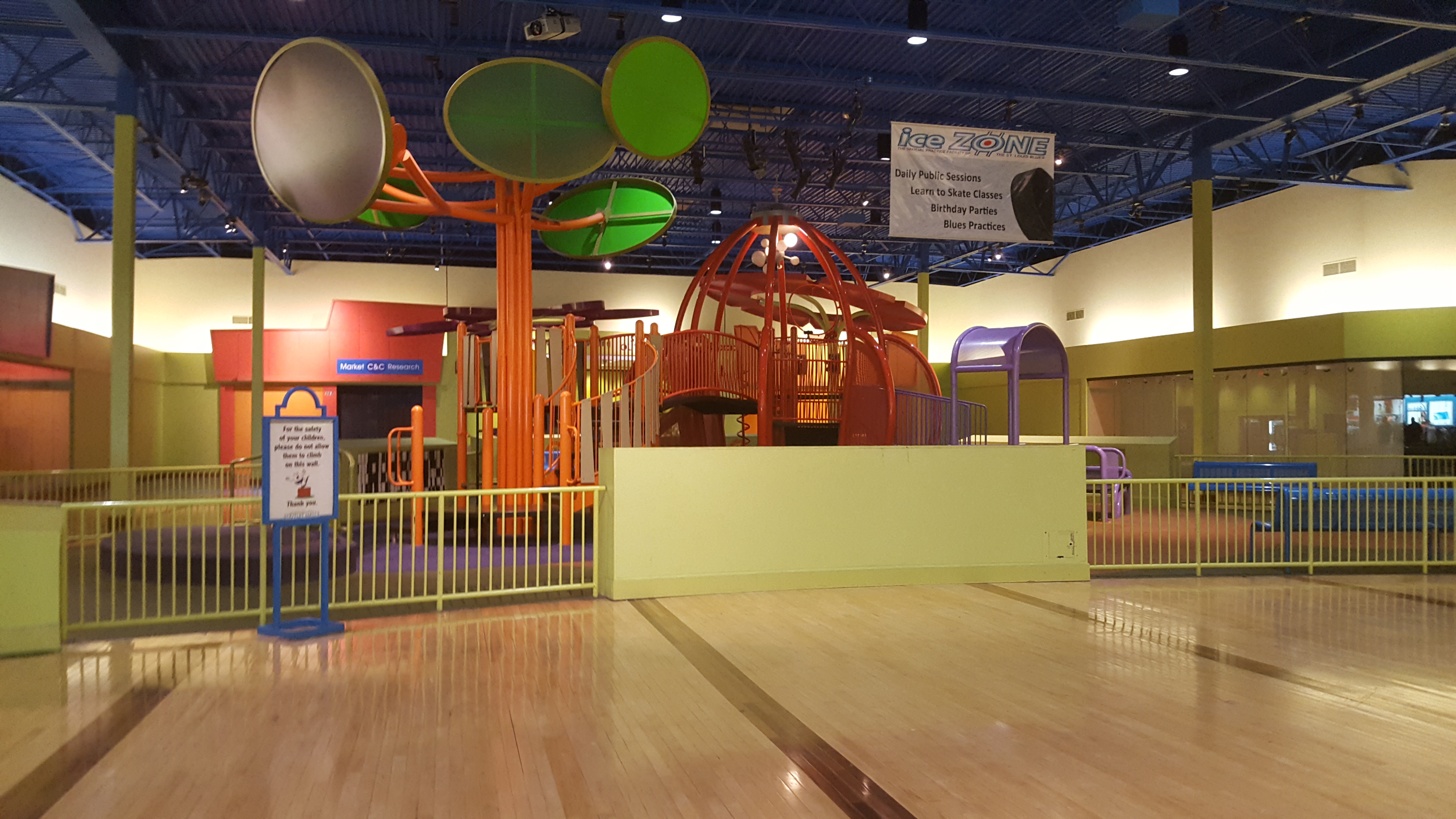
Former PBS Kids Backyard at St. Louis Mills, at the time renamed St. Louis Outlet Mall, as viewed in December 2016. After the attraction closed, it became a generic children's play area.

In September 1999, The Mills Corporation opened its first mall to use sponsorships, being NASCAR for Concord Mills in North Carolina, designed by the St. Louis, Missouri-based Kiku Obata & Company. This was followed by Katy Mills in Fort Bend County, Texas, which opened in October 1999, and was designed by the Baltimore-based RTKL Associates to feature a sports theme, with its mascots being sentient stars.

Mills used sponsors again with the development of Arundel Mills in Hanover, Maryland. The mall featured the Muvico Theaters Arundel Mills Egyptian 24 megaplex, while the sponsors for the mall were The Coca-Cola Company, Toyota, The Baltimore Sun, Comcast, and Discover Card. Additional sponsors included Bank of America and the University of Maryland Baltimore Washington Medical Center. Designed by RTKL subsidiary ID8 and the Somerville, Massachusetts-based D'Agostino Izzo Quirk, the architects and Mills took inspiration from the Rouse Company for the creation of Arundel Mills.

Mills sold naming rights to its planned "Sugarloaf Mills" project in Metro Atlanta to Discover Card; the mall opened in November 2001 as Discover Mills. This was the first instance of a mall selling its own naming rights. In September 2002, Mills acquired six regular retail malls, including the failing Forest Fair Mall. Nine malls were also purchased, including ones formerly owned by Taubman, such as Columbus City Center, Marley Station Mall, and Great Mall of the Bay Area. In December 2002, Mills purchased Riverside Square, and announced that 248,000 square feet (23,000 m^{2}) of retail space would be added.

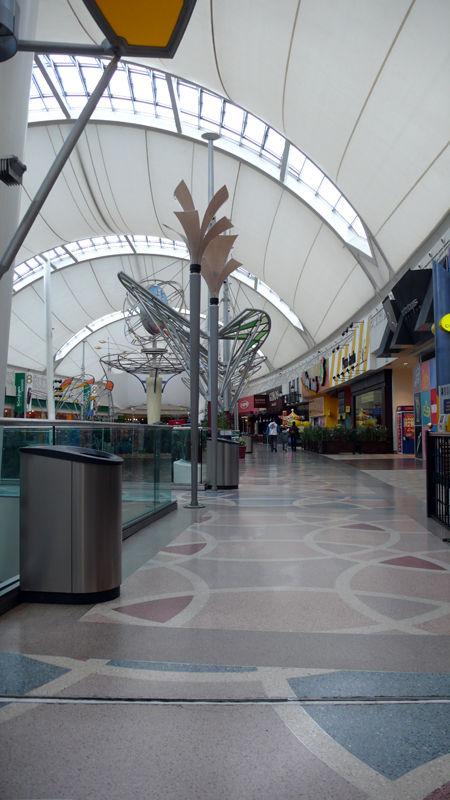
Madrid Xanadú interior (April 2007)

The company also expanded its presence to Europe, with the May 2003 opening of Madrid Xanadú in Spain. In late June 2002, Mills partnered with PBS for the creation of the PBS Kids Backyard, and its larger version, the PBS Kids Neighborhood. The first mall to use this learn-and-play area was St. Louis Mills in Hazelwood, Missouri, which opened on November 13, 2003. In addition to PBS, Discover Card and Coca-Cola, The Mills Corp. also formed partnerships with Crayola, ESPN, and Gibson Guitar, as well as partnering with other mall developers, such as Stevinson Associates for Colorado Mills in Jefferson County, which opened in mid-November 2002.

In February 2004, The Mills Corporation relocated its headquarters from Arlington, Virginia to Chevy Chase, Maryland. Forest Fair Mall was renovated into Cincinnati Mills, which had its grand reopening in August 2004, featuring an updated paint job and redecorations. It was the second Mills mall to have two floors, the first being Algonquin Mills. In November 2004, Vaughan Mills was developed in collaboration with Ivanhoé Cambridge, being the first Mills mall in Canada. Mills continued its international presence with the acquisition of the St. Enoch Centre, in Scotland and was offered to build a center in Barcelona and Rome, Italy, both of which were eventually never developed. Mills and Ivanhoé Cambridge planned to develop several other Landmark Mills malls in Canada, targeting Montreal, Calgary, and Vancouver as potential locations.

Galleria at Pittsburgh Mills had its grand opening in July 2005, developed in a joint venture with Zamias Services, Inc., the latter of which originally planned the project in 1981 as Frazer Heights Galleria. This Mills mall featured traditional anchors rather than outlet versions, including Kaufmann's (later Macy's),) JCPenney, and a Sears Grand store. Sawgrass Mills was renovated in 2004, and The Colonnade Outlets opened in March 2006.

== Problems and acquisition ==
The success of Madrid Xanadú prompted the Mills Corporation to embark on the $1 billion+ Meadowlands Xanadu megamall and entertainment complex, which began construction in September 2004. However, the company faced potential covenant defaults on its revolving and term loan facilities. The company's own founder, Herbert S. Miller, which retained an immense ownership stake under "Mills LP" (The Mills Limited Partnership), the umbrella operating entity that actually owned the physical malls, filed a lawsuit on March 31, 2006, citing breach of contract, breach of fiduciary duty, and gross negligence. Miller argued in Miller, et al. v. The Mills Corporation, et al. that the company had hidden extensive cost overruns, entered into disastrous mega-developments (Meadowlands Xanadu), and that outside auditor Ernst & Young's internal warnings to the Mills Corporation, which date back to February 2002, have been ignored.

The Securities & Exchange Commission (SEC) investigated Mills on May 1, 2006, and ultimately filed a lawsuit, for massive liquidity pressures related to Xanadu and several other development projects. Plaintiffs and Ernst & Young of In re The Mills Corporation Securities Litigation accused Mills of issuing false financial statements and material misrepresentations in SEC filings. An internal probe forced Mills to restate 23 consecutive quarters of financial results from 2000 to 2005, revealing that shareholders' equity had been overstated by roughly $350 million (35%), and net income for 2003 to 2005 had been overstated by $210 million (158%).

On August 10, 2006, it was reported that Mills burrowed nearly $2 billion in May to continue its projects, though if the company was unable find a buyer by the end of the year, the company would've been forced into bankruptcy liquidation or a lender-controlled foreclosure. By this point, the price for Meadowlands Xanadu had skyrocketed to $2.0 billion—an unexpected $800 million spike over estimates provided months earlier. To try and pump in more cash, Mills sold all of its international properties—including the rights to use the "Mills" name—to Ivanhoé Cambridge for $981 million ($1.1 billion in CAD) on August 15, 2006.

Over-expansion, particularly the massive plans for Meadowlands Xanadu, was assumed as the reason for the financial struggles; Pittsburgh Mills and St. Louis Mills were built in oversaturated markets, forcing Pittsburgh Mills into a "soft opening" due to an extremely low rate of tenant sign-ups, while St. Louis Mills ultimately closed its doors in 2019. Recognizing this issue, The Mills Corp. canceled ten planned projects earlier in January 2006, absorbing a $71 million write-off. Siegel was blamed as being responsible for the company's financial struggles; Mills' stock dropped from over $65 in the summer of 2005 to $16.71. Several executives retired in October 2006, and Siegel stepped down as CEO. COO Mark S. Ordan took over as CEO. To avoid filing for bankruptcy, Mills was attempting to search for a buyer.

=== 2007–2012: Acquisition by Simon Property Group ===
The Mills Corporation was still unable to sell itself, and on January 9, 2007, it was warned that the company would've been forced into bankruptcy if a buyer couldn't be found. On January 17, 2007, Mills agreed to a buyout from Brookfield Asset Management, based out of Toronto. The deal was valued at US$1.35 billion. Brookfield would have paid $21 for each share of the Mills Corporation.

However, on February 13, 2007, Mills announced that their board had determined that a competing offer from SPG-FCM Ventures, LLC, a Delaware-based partnership consisting of Simon Property Group, Inc. of Indianapolis, Indiana, and Farallon Capital Management LLC, was superior to the Brookfield offer. Brookfield had the option to submit a counter offer, but on February 16, 2007, Simon and Farallon Capital agreed to acquire Mills for $25.25 per common share. The acquisition was completed on April 3, 2007, and the Mills Corp.'s outlet mall portfolio was reorganized as a division of Simon Property Group, known as The Mills: A Simon Company, or simply "The Mills", which became Simon's fifth retail platform, along with Regional Malls and Premium Outlets. In March 2012, Simon bought out Farallon's stake in 26 Landmark Mills malls for $1.5 billion.

=== 2007–present: Post-acquisition ===
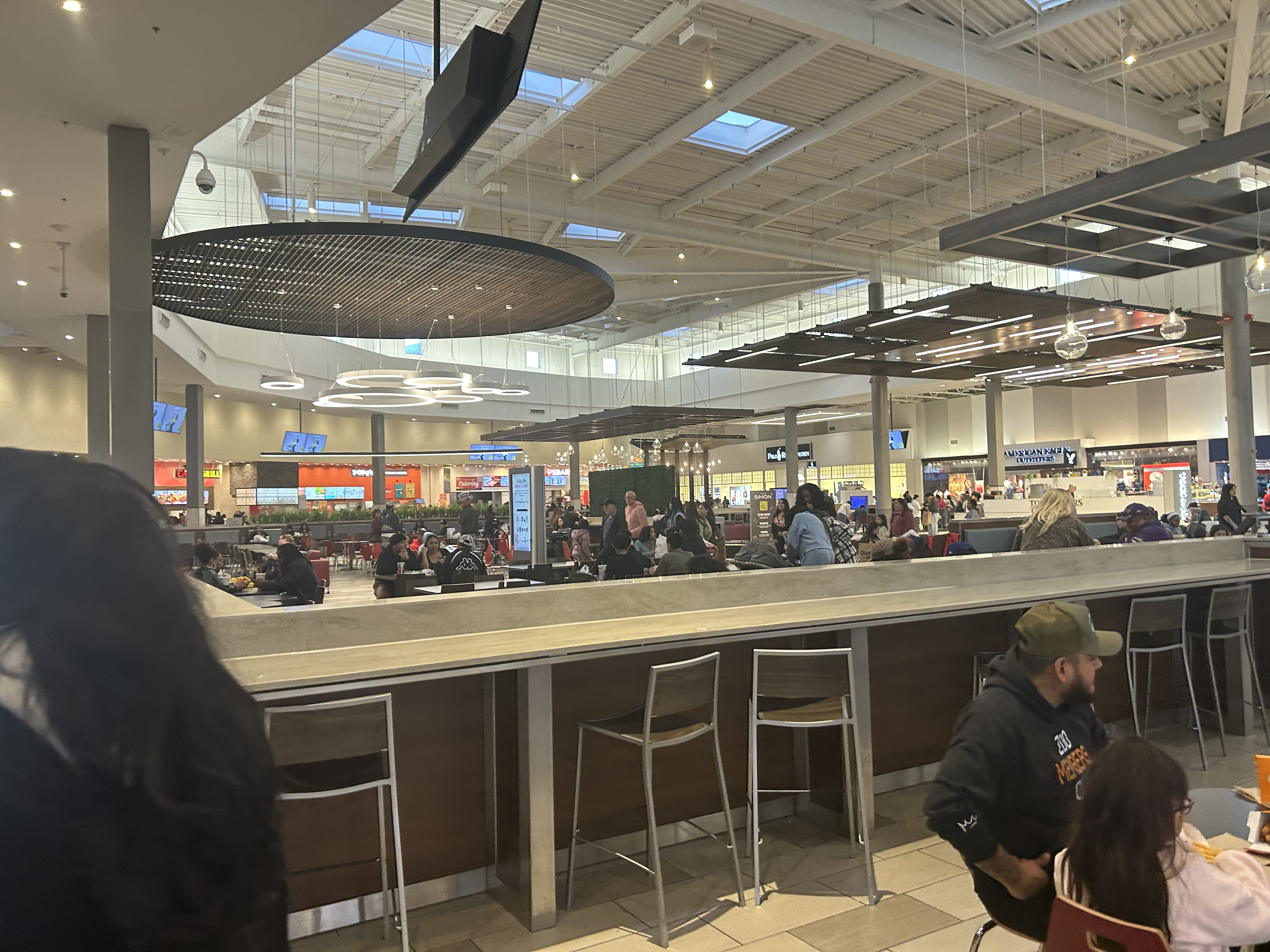
Arundel Mills food court after 2017–2018 renovation, now Dining Pavilion. Formerly known as The Roundhouse.

As part of that 2006 sale, Ivanhoé Cambridge became the sole developer of the planned Canadian Mills projects. In August 2009, CrossIron Mills opened in Calgary, followed by the October 2016 opening of Tsawwassen Mills in Delta, British Columbia, The proposed Montreal project, Laval Mills in Quebec, was canceled in May 2011. Great Mall of the Bay Area was placed under the Mills and Premium Outlets divisions, as its layout mirrors the Mills malls.

In March 2014, Gary Duncan, who was originally the executive vice president of leasing for the new division, became president for leasing of Premium Outlets and The Mills. After the acquisition, Simon began renovating the former Mills malls to resemble traditional malls, the first one being Grapevine Mills in 2012, followed by Franklin Mills, which they renamed Philadelphia Mills in 2014. Simon acquired The Outlet Collection Jersey Gardens from Glimcher Realty Trust in early 2015, and Mills president and former Mills Corp. employee Gregg Goodman announced the mall would be expanded and renamed The Mills at Jersey Gardens.

In the late 2010s, many of the original food courts in the Mills malls were renovated by Simon into "Dining Pavilions", stripping away their original themes and colors. In February 2020, Simon acquired an 80% stake in Taubman for $3.6 billion, placing their entire mall portfolio under their ownership and management. Dolphin Mall in Miami-Dade County, and Great Lakes Crossing Outlets in Oakland County, Michigan, were both former Taubman properties placed under the Mills division. Arundel Mills underwent a $3.5 million renovation that was finished by July 2023, which included painting over the last remnants of the original colorful ceilings. As of November 2026, the Mills retail platform has reached an occupancy rate of 98.9%.

== Relationship with KanAm ==
The Mills Corporation frequently partnered with German-based investment firm KanAm Group, which helped fund and develop multiple Mills malls. Through funds like KanAm USA XX and XXI, they invested in major U.S. malls, including Arundel Mills, Concord Mills, Colorado Mills, and Galleria at Pittsburgh Mills. During the SEC investigation of the Mills Corporation, KanAm panicked and temporarily froze its funds in 2006, with Simon Property Group and General Growth Properties (GGP) interested in acquiring them.

After Simon acquired the Mills Corp., they later attempted to acquire KanAm's shares in the Mills portfolio. However, the Joint Venture Agreements (JVA) contract stated that to acquire KanAm, they had to be paid in "Mills Units". When Simon acquired Mills, those specific units technically went defunct. KanAm sued Simon for this, arguing that the attempted buyout was a breach of contract, and while Simon responded by offering KanAm "Simon Units" as an alternative, KanAm insisted on the Mills Units, and in March 2017, the lawsuit was settled by the Delaware Court of Chancery, which sided with KanAm and argued that because Simon phased out the Mills Units, they are permanently barred from buying out KanAm's shares in the Mills portfolio.

Because of this, KanAm continues to hold shares in the following Mills malls:

- Arundel Mills (40.7%)
- Concord Mills (40.7%)
- Colorado Mills (62.5%)
- Katy Mills (37.5%)
- Grapevine Mills (40.7%)

== Former properties ==
Properties marked with an asterisk (*) were sold prior to the Mills Corporation's acquisition by Simon Property Group. The years next to the mall names are their opening or acquisition date.

=== Developed by Mills ===
- Arizona Mills (1997) – Tempe (Phoenix), Arizona
- Arundel Mills (2000) – Hanover (Baltimore / Washington, D.C.), Maryland
  - Arundel Mills Marketplace (2003)
- The Block at Orange (1998, now The Outlets at Orange) – Orange (Los Angeles), California
- Colorado Mills (2002) – Lakewood (Denver), Colorado
- Concord Mills (1999) – Concord (Charlotte), North Carolina
  - Concord Mills Marketplace (2001, now simply Concord Marketplace)
- Discover Mills (2001, now Sugarloaf Mills) – Lawrenceville (Atlanta), Georgia
- Franklin Mills (1989, later Philadelphia Mills, now Franklin Mall) – Philadelphia, Pennsylvania
- Grapevine Mills (1997) – Grapevine (Dallas–Fort Worth), Texas
- Gurnee Mills (1991) – Gurnee (Chicago), Illinois
- Katy Mills (1999) – Katy (Houston), Texas
- Madrid Xanadú* (later Intu Xanadú, now simply Xanadú) (2003) – Arroyomolinos, Madrid, Spain (sold to Ivanhoé Cambridge in 2006)
- Ontario Mills (1996) – Ontario (Los Angeles), California
- Opry Mills (2000) – Nashville, Tennessee
- Galleria at Pittsburgh Mills* (2005) – Tarentum (Pittsburgh), Pennsylvania (partial ownership, sold to Zamias Services, Inc. in 2006)
  - The Village at Pittsburgh Mills*
- Potomac Mills (1985) – Woodbridge (Washington, D.C.), Virginia
- Sawgrass Mills (1990) – Sunrise (Miami/Fort Lauderdale), Florida
  - Sawgrass Square* (1996)
  - The Oasis at Sawgrass Mills (1999)
  - The Colonnade Outlets (2006)
- St. Louis Mills (2003, later St. Louis Outlet Mall) – Hazelwood (St. Louis), Missouri (closed in 2019, later redeveloped as POWERplex STL, now Hazelwood Business Park)
- Vaughan Mills* (2004) - Vaughan (Toronto), Ontario, Canada (sold to Ivanhoé Cambridge in 2006)

=== Acquisitions and renovations ===
- Briarwood Mall (2004) – Ann Arbor, Michigan
- Cincinnati Mills (Note: Originally The Malls at Forest Fair, later Forest Fair Mall/Village and Cincinnati Mall) (2002, renovated 2004) – Forest Park / Fairfield (Cincinnati), Ohio (closed in December 2022, demolished September 2025–March 2026)
- Columbus City Center (2002) – Columbus, Ohio (closed and demolished 2009–2010)
- Del Amo Fashion Center (2002) – Torrance (Los Angeles), California
- St. Enoch Centre* (2005) – Glasgow, Scotland, United Kingdom (50% ownership, sold to Ivanhoé Cambridge in 2006)
- Dover Mall (2003) – Dover, Delaware
- Lakeforest Mall (2003) – Gaithersburg (Washington, D.C.), Maryland
- The Esplanade (2003) – Kenner (New Orleans), Louisiana
- The Falls (2004) – Kendall (Miami), Florida
- Galleria at White Plains – White Plains (New York City), New York
- Great Mall of the Bay Area (2003, renovated 2004–2005) – Milpitas (San Francisco), California
- Hilltop Mall (2004) – Richmond (San Francisco), California (closed 2021)
- The Mall at Tuttle Crossing – Dublin (Columbus), Ohio
- Marley Station Mall (2004) – Glen Burnie (Baltimore), Maryland
- Meadowood Mall (2004) – Reno, Nevada
- Northpark Mall – Ridgeland (Jackson), Mississippi
- Riverside Square (2002, renovated 2004–2008 as The Shops at Riverside) – Hackensack (New York City), New Jersey
- Southdale Center (2005) – Edina (Minneapolis), Minnesota
- Southridge Mall – Milwaukee, Wisconsin
- Stoneridge Mall – Pleasanton (San Francisco), California
- Westland Mall – Hialeah (Miami), Florida

=== Planned or canceled ===
- Block 37 – Chicago, Illinois (opened 2008 by Joseph Freed & Associates)
- City Mills – Orange (Los Angeles), California (opened 1998 as The Block at Orange)
- Meadowlands Xanadu (originally Meadowlands Mills, now American Dream) – East Rutherford (New York), New Jersey (opened 2019–2021 by Triple Five Group)
- Mercati Generali – Rome, Italy (never developed)
- Unnamed Barcelona, Spain project (never developed)
- Stonebridge at Potomac Town Center – Woodbridge (Washington, D.C.), Virginia (opened 2008 (phase I) and 2012 (phase II) by Roadside Development LLC and BlackRock, Inc.)
- Auburn Mills – Auburn Hills (Detroit), Michigan (never developed; opened 1998 by Taubman Centers as Great Lakes Crossing)
- East Balzac Mall project – Rocky View County (Calgary), Alberta, Canada (opened 2009 by Ivanhoé Cambridge as CrossIron Mills)
- Metro Vancouver project – Delta (Vancouver), British Columbia, Canada (opened 2016 by Ivanhoé Cambridge as Tsawwassen Mills)
  - Tsawwassen Commons (opened 2016 by Property Development Group)
- Montreal project – Laval (Montreal), Quebec, Canada (planned by Ivanhoé Cambridge as Laval Mills; never developed)
- Candlestick Mills – San Francisco, California (never developed)
- Tewksbury Mills – Tewksbury (Boston), Massachusetts (never developed)
- NASCAR SpeedPark at Pittsburgh Mills (never developed)
- Landmark Mills renovation of Great Mall of the Bay Area (never fully completed)
- Other PBS Kids Backyards and Neighborhoods (never developed)
- Dover Mall "shoppertainment" renovation (never developed)

==== Tewksbury Mills ====
In February 2002, The Mills Corporation announced that a $200 million, 750,000-square-foot (70,000 m^{2}) shopping center known as Tewksbury Mills would be developed in Tewksbury, Massachusetts, which would feature a movie theater, ice-skating rink, two hotels, and a restaurant in neighboring Wilmington, putting in "one or more bidding agreements" in 2004 that would allow them to purchase the property.

After the acquisition, Simon Property Group, under The Mills Limited Partnership, warned in August 2007 that if the $55 million interchange for Tewksbury Mills wasn't completed, then the project would be canceled. On September 28, 2007, Simon announced that the mall wouldn't be constructed, and instead, a mixed-use development consisting of a lifestyle center and office space would be built on the site, though the viability of such had been tied to construction of a proposed I-93 Lowell Junction Tri-Town Interchange. On November 21, 2007, they acquired the 112-acre (45 ha) site for the mall from the Perkins Development Trust.

By August 16, 2009, the 128-acre (52 ha) site had been up for sale, though the Mills division faced a lawsuit from Topsfield Associates Inc., which owed a brokerage commission of $400,000 for the project. Topsfield alleged breach of contract, as Simon quietly put the site on the market. Mills and Simon spent $7 million to purchase the two parcels that make up the 128-acre property.
