= Western Development Corporation =

Private developer in Washington, D.C.

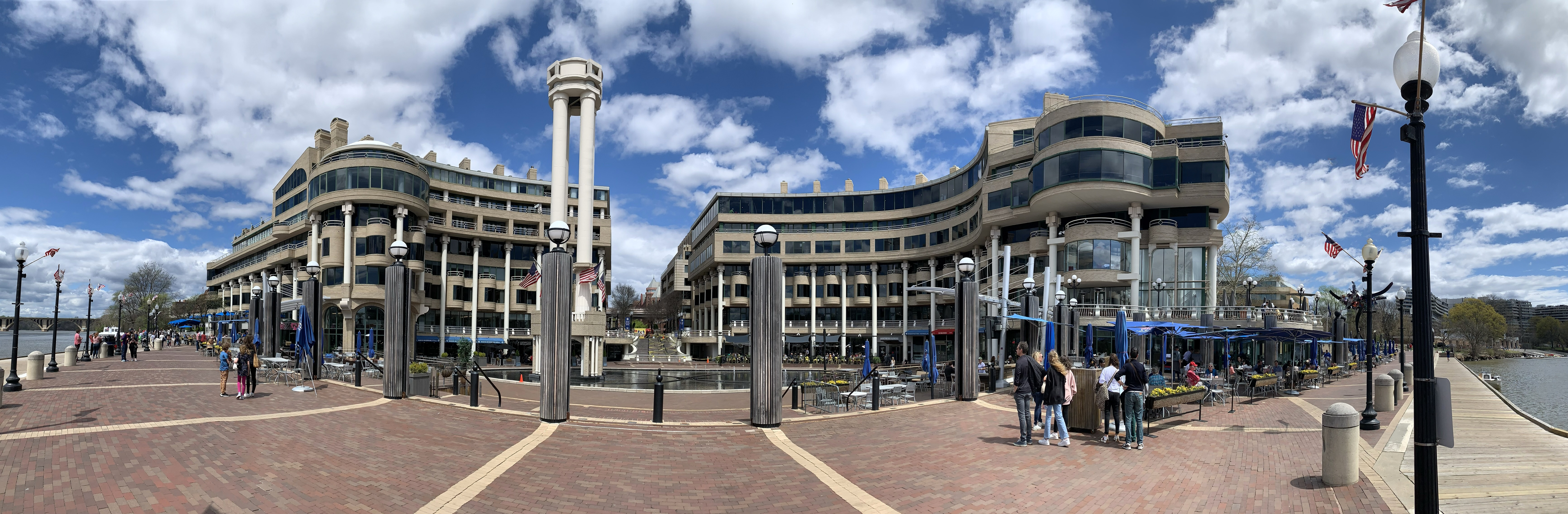
- Washington Harbour (April 2022)
- Type: Private
- Industry: Real estate
- Founded: 1967; 59 years ago
- Founders: Herbert S. Miller; Richard L. Kramer
- Successors: The Mills Corporation (Landmark Mills malls only); Republic Properties Corporation (commercial spin-off)
- Headquarters: Washington, D.C.
- Products: Shopping centers; Mixed-use developments
- Subsidiaries: The Mills Corporation (1991–1994)
- Website: westerndevelopment.com

Western Development Corporation (WDC) is a real estate development and management company based in Washington, D.C., founded in 1967. The company specializes in retail properties, urban development and mixed-use complexes, including Washington Harbour and Georgetown Park, and the invention of the "Mills Concept", with the development of Potomac Mills, Algonquin Mills, Franklin Mall, Sawgrass Mills, and Gurnee Mills. Around the late 1980s and early 1990s, leadership split, with the creation of the Mills Corporation in 1991, and Republic Properties Corporation, which completed the development of Market Square.

== History ==
=== 20th century ===
Western Development Corporation was founded by Herbert S. Miller and Richard L. Kramer in 1967, though Miller temporarily put the company off to focus on working for Shannon and Luchs. In the late '60s to the early '70s, Western developed the Mazza Gallerie in a joint venture with Mrs. Olga Mazza, the real estate subsidiary of ExxonMobil, and anchor store brand Neiman Marcus. In 1973, Miller left Shannon and Luchs to work for the Bloomfield Hills, Michigan-based Taubman Company, developing strip malls and office buildings together. In 1975, Western partnered with the Donohoe Construction Company for the development of what would be planned as a mixed-use shopping park in Downtown Washington, D.C.. They developed Georgetown Park, which opened on September 27, 1981, combining retail with residential and office elements.

The company won the right to develop Market Square—an office and residential complex in downtown D.C.—in 1984. Western Development engineered the "Mills Concept", with the debut of Potomac Mills in Prince William County, Virginia in 1985. Rather than relying on department stores, the Mills concept would combine off-price stores with factory outlets. Later, in 1986, Western acquired a former Treasury department store in Rolling Meadows, Illinois, which permanently closed in 1981. The company redeveloped the vacant space into Algonquin Mills. In December 1988, Western sold Algonquin Mills to Aetna Life Insurance Company and The Tucker Companies, and it was renamed Meadows Town Mall.

By the late 1980s, Western Development was facing immense hurdles, including a sluggish overall economy, overdue taxes, property lien foreclosure threats, and an external lawsuit filed by a business partner during the development of Franklin Mills in Philadelphia, Pennsylvania, that highlighted that Miller and Kramer were "embroiled in extensive and protracted negotiations with a view toward the dissolution and division of their respective interests". When Western rapidly expanded its Mills portfolio, the complex scale strained their joint operations. As a result, the founders split; Miller retained control of the mega mall portfolio, forming the Mills Corporation in 1991, and converting it into a REIT in 1994, replacing Western as the parent company of the Mills malls. Franklin Mills opened in 1989, named and themed the mall after Benjamin Franklin, making it the company's second Landmark Mills mall development. Sawgrass Mills in South Florida, and Gurnee Mills in Lake County, Illinois, opened in 1990 and 1991, respectively. Sawgrass Mills was a flagship property for Western Development Corporation, and their third Landmark Mills mall development, designed to be themed after and resemble an alligator. Gurnee Mills would follow as the fourth Landmark Mills mall and the final Mills-branded mall developed under Western.

Kramer continued focusing on commercial urban development, such as Market Square in 1989, spinning off Western Urban Development Corp., which was later renamed Republic Properties Corporation in 1991. Miller lead the Mayor's Interactive Downtown Task Force—a 100-member committee formed to revitalize D.C.—in the mid-1990s.

=== 21st century ===
The company opened Gallery Place in 2004, featuring a 14-screen Regal Cinemas, condominiums, and over 200,000 square feet (19,000 m^{2}) of retail and office space.

Herb Miller's son, Benjamin J. "Ben" Miller, joined Western Development Corporation in 2003 as a board advisor, later becoming Chief Operating Officer (COO) in 2005, and President in April 2006. Under Ben Miller, Western Development oversaw the development and transaction activities of over 1.5 million square feet (140,000 m^{2}) of property, including over $500 million in real estate acquisitions. However, the 2008 Great Recession caused financial problems for traditional firms; as a result, the Millers began exploring alternative ways to fund urban development, with Ben Miller leaving Western in October 2010 to co-founder Fundrise.
