= Slick City Action Park =

American indoor slide park

- Type: Public
- Industry: Entertainment
- Founded: 2022
- Founder: Bron Launsby; Gary Schmit
- Headquarters: Chesterfield, Missouri, U.S.
- Number of locations: 150
- Website: slickcity.com

Slick City Action Park is an American company founded in 2022 by Bron Launsby and Gary Schmit. The company is the first indoor slide park in the world.

== History ==
The company was founded in 2022 and later opening their first location in Denver, Colorado.

In March 2024, Slick City announced that they had begun franchising across the nation.

In October 2025, Slick City announced they stood at 107 locations signed or opened across the country.

In April 2026, Slick City surpassed 150 locations currently open and developing.
