= GameWorks =

Largely defunct gaming-based entertainment center

GameWorks, Inc.
- Type: Private
- Industry: Entertainment
- Predecessor: Sega City
- Founded: July 1996; 30 years ago
- Defunct: December 24, 2021 (as a nationwide brand)
- Fate: Several Chapter 11 bankruptcy filings; Liquidation
- Successor: Dave & Buster's; Tilt Studio; In The Game Sawgrass Mills (formerly GameRoom Sawgrass); Round1 Bowling & Arcade; Several more
- Headquarters: Seattle, Washington, United States
- Number of locations: 1 (as of 2022)
- Owners: Howard Brand; Greg Stevens
- Website: gameworks.com

GameWorks is a gaming-based entertainment center with a single location as of 2022. It was owned by then-owner ExWorks Capital, each venue featured a wide array of video game arcades, in addition to full-service bars and restaurants. It was originally created in 1996 as a joint venture by Sega, DreamWorks SKG, and Universal Studios, with the company growing into an international chain. Two former executives subsequently acquired the Seattle location and reopened it in August 2022.

== History ==
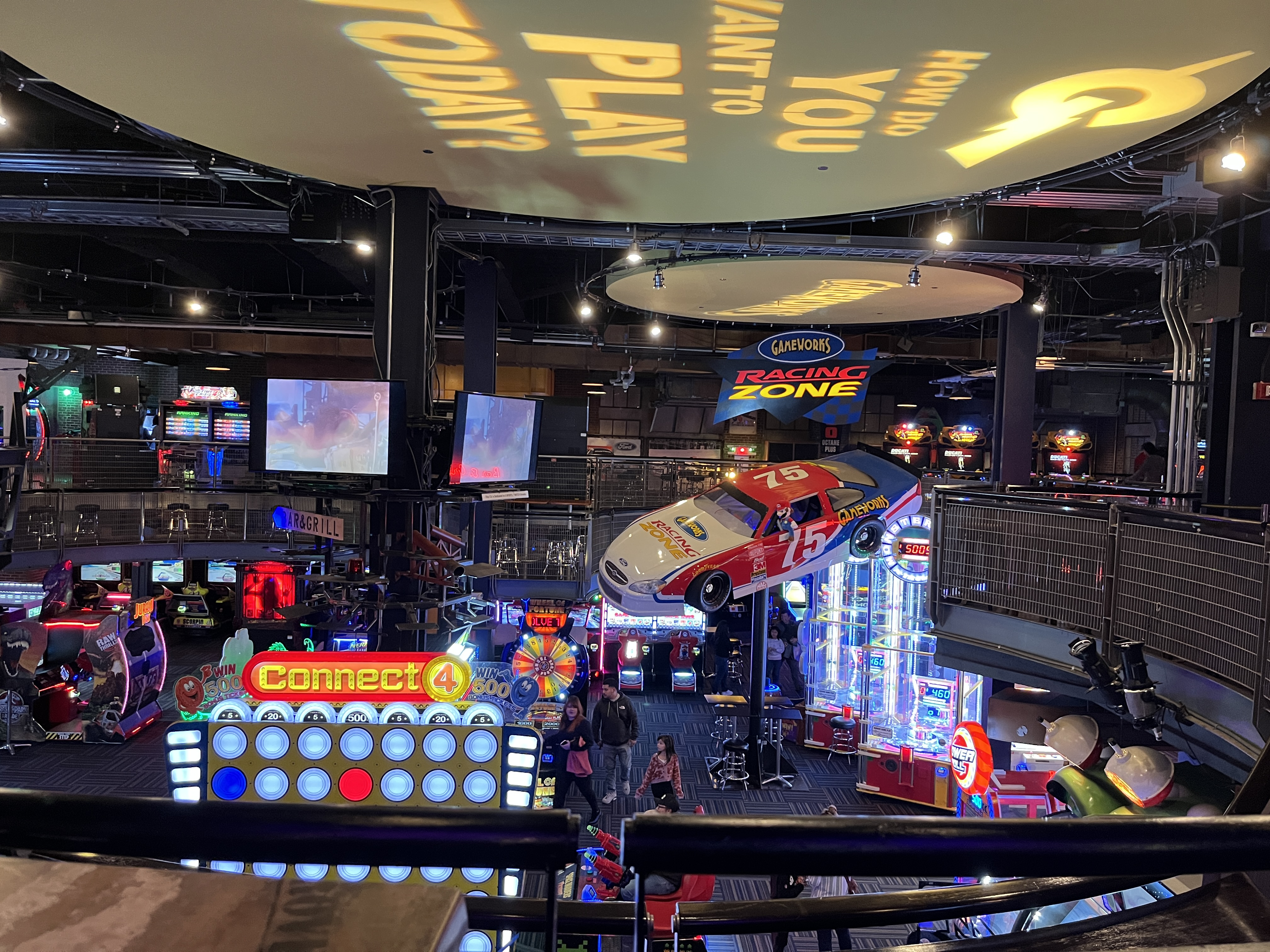
Interior of GameWorks in Seattle, November 2022

GameWorks began as a joint venture between the video game developer Sega and the film studios Universal Studios and DreamWorks, with filmmaker Steven Spielberg providing creative input. Skip Paul was GameWorks' first chairman and CEO, and Jon Snoddy headed the design team. Its first location opened in Seattle in March 1997 with many high-profile guests in attendance, such as celebrities Will Smith and Gillian Anderson and billionaire Bill Gates. DreamWorks sold its portion in 2001.

GameWorks filed its first bankruptcy in 2004. On November 3, 2005, Sega Sammy Holdings, formed following the 2004 merger of Sega and Sammy, bought the controlling interests of GameWorks. GameWorks filed its second bankruptcy in 2010; as a result, Sega Entertainment USA, the parent company at that time, closed seven GameWorks venues on March 29, in an attempt to focus on profitability and future growth. Two locations that closed, one in Circle Centre at Indianapolis, Indiana, and another in Irvine Spectrum Center at Irvine, California, originally opened as Sega City.

In 2011, GameWorks was sold to an investment group, HNR Capital. In October 2011, GameWorks acquired the assets of several Jillian's Billiards Clubs in California, Washington, and Virginia.

In May 2017, Oomba acquired GameWorks. In May 2018, Chicago-based ExWorks Capital took ownership of GameWorks.

On December 24, 2021, GameWorks announced that it would be closing all of its remaining locations, citing financial difficulties brought on by the COVID-19 pandemic. Greg Stevens, who served as the company's CEO from 2011 to 2018, subsequently reacquired the assets of the Seattle location with business partner Howard Brand, a managing partner at former owner HNR Capital. After some reorganization, the Seattle location reopened on August 3, 2022, after the closure due to the COVID-19 pandemic.

== Locations ==
- Seattle, Washington - Downtown Seattle (Opened March 15, 1997, closed December 24, 2021, reopened August 3, 2022)

=== Former locations ===
==== Standard ====
- Auburn Hills, Michigan - Great Lakes Crossing Outlets (closed March 29, 2010, now Sea Life Michigan Aquarium)
- Bloomington, Minnesota, Mall of America (closed December 24, 2021)
- Chesapeake, Virginia - Greenbrier Mall (Closed in March 2020) (formerly Jillian's)
- City of Industry, California - Puente Hills Mall (Changed to Tilt Arcade until it ultimately also closed. The mall is now anchored by Round 1.)
- Columbus, Ohio - Easton Town Center (closed March 29, 2010, reopened as Kitchen Den Bar, now Legoland Discovery Center)
- Denver, Colorado - Northfield Stapleton (Opened in March 2016, closed December 24, 2021)
- Grapevine, Texas - Grapevine Mills (closed June 27, 2010, now Sea Life Grapevine Aquarium)
- Irvine, California - Irvine Spectrum Center (opened as Sega City, later became Fox Sports Grill, now Paul Martin's)
- Las Vegas, Nevada - Showcase Mall on the Las Vegas Strip (closed March 11, 2012)
- Las Vegas, Nevada - Town Square (Las Vegas) (Opened on July 28, 2014, closed December 24, 2021, location is now a Velocity Esports arcade)
- Long Beach, California - Downtown Long Beach - Waterfront - The Pike at Rainbow Harbor (closed March 29, 2010, reopened as Kitchen Den Bar until The Pike was ultimately closed and remodeled.)
- Minneapolis, Minnesota - Downtown Minneapolis (closed March 29, 2010)
- Newport, Kentucky (near Cincinnati, Ohio) - Newport on the Levee (Opened in October 2001, closed December 24, 2021)
- Ontario, California - Ontario Mills (closed July 5, 2017, now Under Armour Factory Store).
- Orange, California - The Outlets at Orange (replaced with The Power House Arcade until its closure)
- Rosedale, Maryland - Golden Ring Mall (as Sega City, closed 1999)
- Salt Lake City, Utah - The Gateway Mall (closed 2015)
- Schaumburg, Illinois - The Streets of Woodfield (Opened on June 3, 1999, closed December 24, 2021, now Dave & Buster's)
- South Miami, Florida - The Shops at Sunset Place (now GameTime)
- Sunrise, Florida - Sawgrass Mills (then GameRoom, now In the Game)
- Tampa, Florida - Centro Ybor (closed March 29, 2010 now GameTime)
- Tempe, Arizona - Arizona Mills (opened November 19, 1997; closed January 29, 2016, now Tilt Studio)

==== GameWorks Studio ====
- Austin, Texas - Lakeline Mall
- Indianapolis, Indiana - Circle Centre Mall (First opened as Sega City) (closed March 29, 2010, now Tilt Studio)
- Lone Tree, Colorado - Park Meadows Mall
- Philadelphia, Pennsylvania - Center City Philadelphia - Riverview Plaza
- San Antonio, Texas - Alamo Quarry Market (closed April 2009)
- Tucson, Arizona - Foothills Mall (reopened as World Sports Grill, which later closed.)

=== International locations ===
- Kuwait City, Kuwait (Opened in 2003, later called Gamewizz, closed in 2013)
- Mexico City, Mexico (Opened in 2006, closed in 2020)
- Rio de Janeiro, Brazil (Opened in 1999. Despite being a very successful location, constantly full, it was closed in 2003 due to disagreements with the local representative. They wanted to remove the restaurant, and only keep the two bars. The Brazilian company created its own arcade brand, called HotZone.)
- Santo Domingo, Dominican Republic (at Mega Centro Mall, opened in a former McDonald's fast food, closed in 2015)
- Tumon, Guam (Closed in 2006)
- Vienna, Austria (Opened in November 2001, filed for bankruptcy in April 2002)

== See also ==
- Tilt Studio
- Round 1
- Dave & Buster's
- Chuck E. Cheese
- Boomers!
