= Legoland Discovery Center Chicago =

Entertainment center in Illinois, United States

- Interactive map of Legoland Discovery Center Chicago
- Location: The Streets of Woodfield, Schaumburg, Illinois, United States
- Coordinates: 42.039746°N 88.034010°W
- Status: Operating
- Opened: 2008; 18 years ago
- Owner: The LEGO Group
- Theme: Family Entertainment Center
- Website: legolanddiscoverycenter.com/chicago

The Legoland Discovery Center Chicago is an indoor family entertainment center located in The Streets of Woodfield shopping center in Schaumburg, Illinois. Legoland Discovery Center Chicago is owned and operated by The LEGO Group. Previously, it was operated by the British leisure group Merlin Entertainments.

== History ==
The Lego brick was invented by Danish carpenter Ole Kirk Christiansen in 1958. After the brand's success, employees at the Lego factory in Billund, Denmark started to put Lego models outside. As these models became popular with visitors to the factory, it was decided to turn them into a tourist attraction - becoming the first ever Legoland. The first Legoland Discovery Center was opened in Berlin in 2007, and since then a total of 12 Legoland Discovery centers have been opened. Legoland Discovery Center Chicago opened in 2008 and was the first Legoland Discovery Center in North America.

== Attractions ==
- A Lego replica of the local Chicagoland area
- An Expedition featuring life-sized Lego models of animals and a quiz trail
- Kingdom Quest Laser Ride, where visitors experience multiple objectives while looking for a treasure chest
- Lego 4D Cinema showing 4D films featuring popular Lego characters.
- Lego Master Builder Academy offers classes with Legoland Discovery Center's Master Model Builders
- Lego cars building and testing area
- Merlin's Apprentice Ride, where visitors can pedal to lift off the ground and look over the rest of Legoland Discovery Center Chicago
- Duplo Village features a play slide, large animal models, and Lego Duplo bricks to build with
- Café serving food, drinks, and snacks
- Legoland Discovery Center Shop with over 900 products
- Birthday Rooms for exclusive use as part of Legoland Discovery Center's Party Package
- Pirate Adventure Island where visitors can build Lego boats and use them for races
