= Legoland Discovery Center Boston =

Indoor family entertainment center

LEGO Discovery Center Boston
- Interactive map of LEGO Discovery Center Boston
- Location: 598 Assembly Row, Somerville, Massachusetts, USA
- Coordinates: 42°23′40.9″N 71°4′46.6″W
- Status: Closed For Renovation
- Opened: 2014 (Original) 2023 (Re-opening)
- Owner: Merlin Entertainments
- Theme: Family Entertainment Center
- Website: www.legolanddiscoverycenter.com/boston

LEGO Discovery Center Boston is an indoor family entertainment center in Assembly Row, Somerville, Massachusetts themed around LEGO products and properties. The attraction opened in 2014, and is currently undergoing a $12 million renovation until Spring 2023 when it will become LEGO Discovery Center. Prior to closing for renovation, the attraction included a LEGO scale model of landmarks in Boston and other Massachusetts cities, such as Gillette Stadium and Fenway Park. It also included several other attractions, such as a 4D theater and several small rides. The attractions are to remain closed during the renovation, however the attached store will remain open. Legoland Discovery Center Boston is owned and operated by leisure group Merlin Entertainments.

== History ==
The first Legoland Discovery Center opened in Berlin in 2007. Legoland Discovery Center Boston opened in 2014.

== Rides and attractions ==
- Lego Factory Tour, a showcase of how LEGO bricks are made.
- Lego 4D Cinema, a 4D film theater.
- Kingdom Quest Laser Ride, a ride in which guests fire toy guns from a moving ride vehicle.
- A replica of Boston and other landmarks, known as Miniland.
- An area where visitors can build and test Lego Racers.
- Merlin's Apprentice Ride, in which visitors pedal on a spinning ride.
- Lego City: Play Zone, a play area featuring climbing walls, slides, and a jungle gym.
- Lego Master Builder Academy, which offered Legoland Discovery Center's Master Model Builders.
- The Legoland Discovery Center Shop.
- Lego Duplo Farm containing Duplo bricks to build with plus larger soft play bricks.
- An area where guests test the strength of structures they build on Lego towers.
- Lego Friends Olivia's House a Lego Friends themed area containing karaoke and other activities.
- A Café.
- Birthday Rooms offered for exclusive use as part a party package.
