= Legoland Discovery Center Westchester =

Indoor family entertainment center

- Interactive map of Legoland Discovery Center Westchester
- Location: Westchester's Ridge Hill, Yonkers, New York, USA
- Coordinates: 40°57′59.5″N 73°51′25″W
- Status: Operating
- Owner: Merlin Entertainments
- Theme: Family Entertainment Center
- Website: www.legolanddiscoverycenter.com/westchester/

Legoland Discovery Center Westchester is an indoor family entertainment center located at Westchester's Ridge Hill in Yonkers, New York in Westchester County. The attraction includes Lego rides, a play area, a 4D cinema and a gift shop. Legoland Discovery Center Westchester is owned and operated by leisure group Merlin Entertainments.

== History ==
Lego bricks were invented by Danish carpenter Ole Kirk Kristiansen in 1958. The first Legoland Discovery Center was opened in Berlin in 2007, and since then a total of 12 Legoland Discovery Centers have been opened. Legoland Discovery Center Westchester was opened in March 2013.

== Rides & Attractions ==
- Lego Factory Tour where visitors can learn how LEGO bricks are made
- Lego 4D Cinema showing 4D films featuring popular LEGO characters throughout the day
- Kingdom Quest Laser Ride where visitors must zap the trolls and skeletons
- A lego replica of the local area in Miniland
- An area where visitors can build and test Lego Racers
- Merlin's Apprentice Ride where visitors can pedal to lift off the ground and look over the rest of Legoland Discovery Center Westchester
- Lego Fire Academy featuring a jungle gym, climbing wall, and slide
- Lego Construction Site featuring soft building bricks, a slide, and a crane cabin to sit in
- Lego Master Builder Academy offering classes with Legoland Discovery Center's Master Model Builders
- The Legoland Discovery Center Shop with over 900 products
- Duplo Village featuring a play slide, large animal models, and DUPLO bricks to build with
- Visitors can build a LEGO tower and test its strength on the Earthquake Tables
- Opportunity to meet the five Lego Friends- Stephanie, Olivia, Andrea, Mia, and Emma- build a LEGO microphone, and perform on the karaoke stage
- Visitors can add new builds to LEGO City and Heartlake City with the City Builder
- Café serving food, drinks and snacks
- Birthday Rooms for exclusive use as part of Legoland Discovery Center's Party Package
