= Arizona Mills =

Shopping mall in Maricopa County

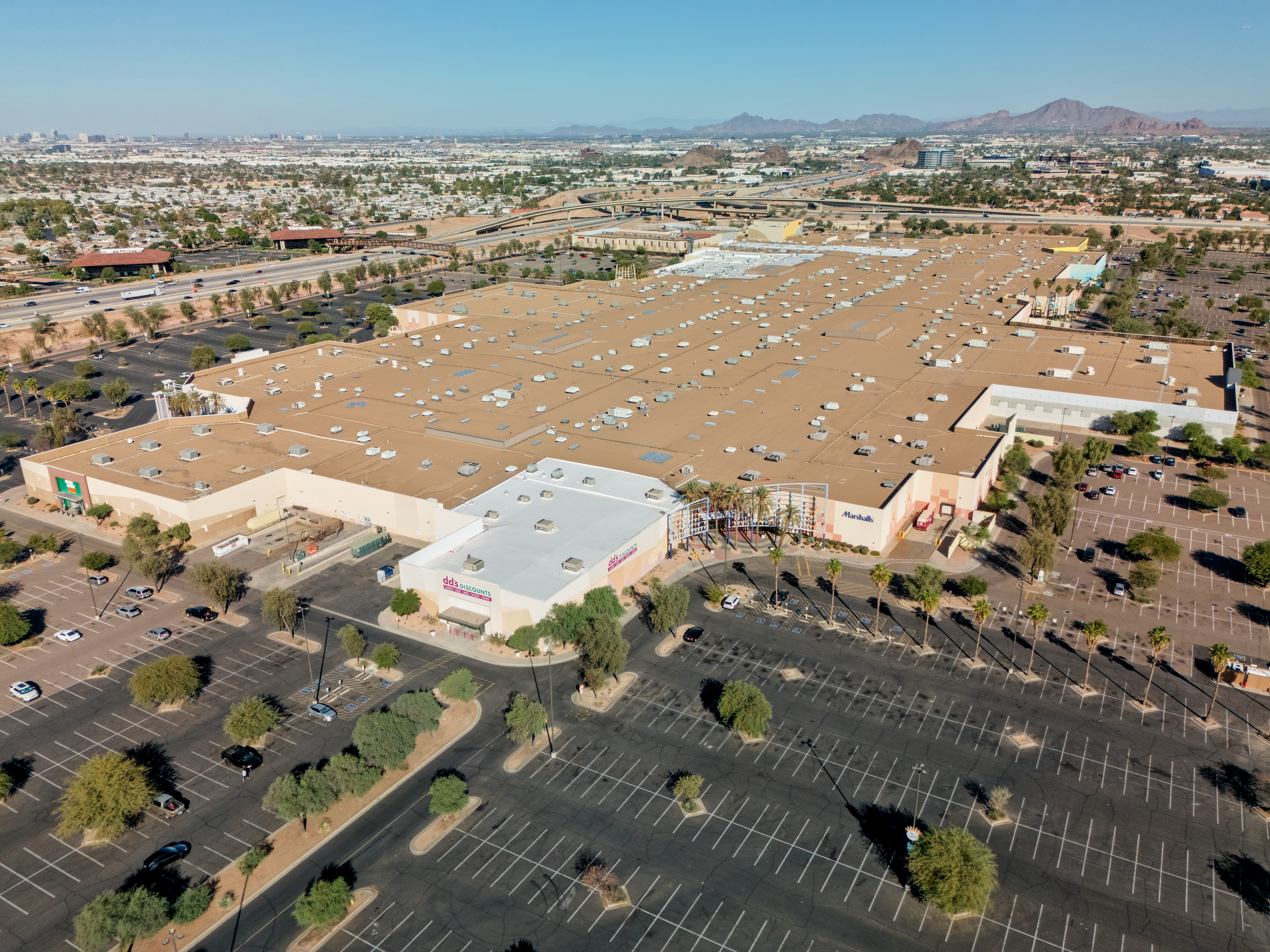
- Southeast aerial view (November 2023)
- Location: Tempe, Arizona, U.S.
- Coordinates: 33°23′05″N 111°58′04″W
- Address: 5000 S Arizona Mills Circle
- Opened: November 20, 1997; 28 years ago
- Renovated: 2014
- Developer: The Mills Corporation; Simon DeBartolo Group; Taubman Centers
- Manager: Simon Property Group
- Owner: Simon Property Group
- Num. of stores: approx. 200 (at peak)
- Num. of anchor tenants: 16 (at peak)
- Floor area: 1,238,193 square feet (120,000 m^{2})
- Floors: 1
- Parking: Parking lot with 6,000 free spaces
- Website: simon.com/mall/arizona-mills
- Building details

General information
- Status: Operational
- Construction started: March 1996; 30 years ago
- Completed: 1997

Design and construction
- Main contractor: Verde Building Corporation

Renovating team
- Architect: Ideation Design Group
- Renovating firm: Simon Property Group; Villa Restaurant Group

Arizona Mills is a super-regional outlet mall in Tempe, Arizona within the Phoenix metropolitan area. It is a tourist destination in suburban Phoenix, Arizona developed by Mills Corporation (which owned 25%), Taubman Centers, and Simon DeBartolo Group (now Simon Property Group, the owner and operator of Arizona Mills as of April 2007). Taubman has since sold its 75% stake to Simon Property Group. Arizona Mills opened on November 20, 1997, with 6,000 parking spaces and approximately 200 retailers.

Arizona Mills is divided into six "neighborhoods", which are concourses of the mall that originally had their own distinct architectural styles and design, with the intention of helping shoppers identify where they are in the mall. However, they have since been "de-themed" in renovations. It is located on the Southeast corner of US 60 and I-10.

== History ==
Despite the term "Mills" in its name, it is not to be confused with Mill Avenue, a shopping and entertainment district near Hayden Butte to the north. The "Mills" name was part of the Mills Corporation's "Landmark Mills" portfolio.

=== 1996–1997: Development and opening ===
Arizona Mills was developed as a joint venture between Mills Corporation, Taubman Centers, Inc., and Simon DeBartolo Group. This partnership was announced on March 24, 1996, and was part of the Mills Corporation's "shoppertainment" model that involved combining retail outlets with entertainment elements.

The site for the mall was selected at the intersection of Interstate 10 and U.S. Route 60 in Tempe, Arizona, which spanned a 115-acre (47 ha) parcel that was formerly owned by Taubman Centers. The Mills Corp., Simon DeBartolo, and Taubman all agreed to construct the 1.2-million-square-foot (110,000 m^{2}) outlet mall on the site. Construction began shortly after the announcement. Arizona Mills had its grand opening on November 20, 1997 with approximately 200 retailers. GameWorks, then operated by Sega, Universal Studios, and DreamWorks Animation, opened one day before the mall.

=== After opening ===
Three days after the mall's grand opening, an IMAX 3D prototype by IMAX Corporation, which later was acquired by Harkins Theatres, and rebranded as Harkins Theatres Arizona Mills w/IMAX, a 24-screen movie theater, debuted at the shopping center.

Simon Property Group sold 50% of its interests in Arizona Mills to Taubman Centers in May 2002. However, in April 2007, Simon acquired the Mills portfolio, including Arizona Mills, alongside Farallon Capital Management, for $1.64 billion, and the branding was relaunched as The Mills: A Simon Company. On May 15, 2010, (Note: The exact opening date may vary depending on the source. This source states that the aquarium opened in November 2007.) Sea Life Arizona Aquarium opened at Arizona Mills. The 26,000-square-foot (2,400 m^{2}) aquarium is open year-round except for Thanksgiving and Christmas, and features a 360° ocean tunnel and interactive touch pools.

In October 2011, JCPenney Outlet Store at Arizona Mills was converted to JC's 5 Star Outlet by SB Capital Group, as the original parent company, JCPenney, cited that they wanted to focus on their department stores and online operations, as the outlet division struggled throughout the late 2000s. In March 2012, Simon Property Group acquired full control of the property's management by buying out Farallon's stake in the Mills portfolio for $1.5 billion. JC's 5 Star Outlet was largely unsuccessful, and it announced in October 2013 that it would close permanently at Arizona Mills in December 2013, alongside the rest of the division.

Taubman then sold its 50% interest in Arizona Mills to Simon in January 2014, granting them 100% ownership of the mall. In August 2014, a 13,262-square-foot (1,232.1 m^{2}) renovation by Simon Property Group and Villa Restaurant Group updated Arizona Mills' food court into the Food Hall by Villa, introducing 10 new dining options including Villa Italian Kitchen and Sukotto Japanese Grill. The food hall was designed by Ideation Design Group, and included porcelain tile flooring, silk plants, and custom lighting. The general contractor for the renovation was Verde Building Corporation. The renovations were announced in April 2014.

On February 12, 2015, Merlin Entertainments and Simon Property Group announced that Legoland Discovery Center (LDC)-an interactive children's attraction—would open at Arizona Mills, with an estimated date of spring 2016. The attraction would build on the success of the Sea Life Aquarium, specifically targeting a family-friendly audience. Legoland Discovery Center cost $12 million to develop, and had its grand opening on April 22, 2016. GameWorks closed its Arizona Mills location permanently on January 29, 2016. It was replaced by Tilt Studio in August 2016.

Due to the COVID-19 pandemic, Simon closed all of its U.S. malls temporarily in March 2020, including Arizona Mills and Phoenix Premium Outlets. The mall would reopen in May 2020 with strict social distancing guidelines. In January 2021, Harkins Theatres announced a renovation of its movie theaters at Arizona Mills and Tempe Marketplace. This would include the addition of an in-lobby bar, electric loungers and upgraded projectors.

In July 2024, Conn's HomePlus announced they would close all 170+ locations, including their Arizona Mills location, due to Chapter 11 bankruptcy. On January 28, 2025, Reclectic opened its doors. Pop Mart opened its first Arizona location at the mall in late March 2026.

== See also ==
- List of shopping malls
