= Merlin Entertainments =

British leisure company

Merlin Entertainments Limited
- Formerly: Merlin Entertainments Group Ltd. (1998–2013); Merlin Entertainments PLC (2013–2019)
- Type: Private
- Industry: Entertainment
- Founded: 14 December 1998; 27 years ago
- Headquarters: London, England
- Key people: Fiona Eastwood (CEO)
- Revenue: ▼£1,999 million (2025)
- Operating income: ▲ -£(58) million (2025)
- Net income: ▲ -£(406) million (2025)
- Total assets: ▼£7,449 million (2025)
- Total equity: ▼£885 million (2025)
- Owners: Motion JVCO Ltd
- Website: merlinentertainments.biz

Merlin Entertainments Limited is a global entertainment company based in London, England, which operates a number of theme park resorts and other visitor attractions. It is currently owned by the consortium Motion JVCO Ltd, which includes Kirkbi (the investment arm of the Kristiansen family that also controls the Lego Group), Blackstone Inc and CPP Investments.

== History ==
In December 1998, Nick Varney, Andrew Carr and the senior management team of Vardon Attractions (Vardon Plc) completed a management buyout of the company to form Merlin Entertainments Group Ltd., with the backing of the private equity firm Apax Partners. Apax sold the company in 2004 to another financial investor, Hermes Private Equity.

In May 2005, the company was acquired from Hermes by a division of the Blackstone Group, which later started a major expansion. Between 2005 and 2010, Merlin acquired the Legoland parks, Gardaland, the Tussauds Group, Cypress Gardens, and various attractions from Village Roadshow Theme Parks and Living and Leisure Australia. The company was first listed on the London Stock Exchange in 2013 but returned to private ownership in 2019.

=== Major acquisitions (2005–2012) ===
After the sale of Merlin to Blackstone Group, the company negotiated to buy control of the Legoland theme parks in 2005 for about £250 million, then merged it with Merlin. As part of the deal, Kirkbi A/S, the investment arm of LEGO's owners, took a share in Merlin Entertainments.

In 2006, Merlin acquired Gardaland theme park resort in northeastern Italy.

In May 2007, Blackstone purchased the Tussauds Group, owner of the Madame Tussauds wax museums, for US$1.9 billion, to merge the company with Merlin. After the Tussauds acquisition, Dubai International Capital, the previous owner, received a 20% stake in the combined entity as well as £1.03bn in cash.

On 16 July 2007, as part of the financing for the Tussauds deal, Blackstone and Prestbury, the investment firm of Nick Leslau, announced a sale and leaseback covering Madame Tussauds London, Thorpe Park, Alton Towers and Warwick Castle for a total of £622 million, with the properties leased back to Merlin on 35-year renewable leases. Prestbury's interest subsequently passed to Secure Income REIT, which merged with LXi REIT in July 2022; LXi was acquired by LondonMetric Property in March 2024. In December 2021 the leases over Alton Towers, Thorpe Park, Warwick Castle and Heide Park were extended by a further 35 years in return for a capital contribution of £33.45 million.

On 15 January 2010, Merlin Entertainments bought Cypress Gardens, a defunct theme park in Winter Haven, Florida. It was reopened as Legoland Florida theme park.

In late 2010, it was announced that Merlin would purchase approximately A$116 million worth of entertainment attractions located in Australia and New Zealand from Village Roadshow Theme Parks. The sale would include Sydney Aquarium, Sydney Wildlife World, Oceanworld Manly, Sydney Tower and the Koala Gallery in Australia, in addition to Kelly Tarlton's Underwater World in New Zealand. On 3 March 2011, the deal was finalised. This was followed by the $140 million acquisition of Living and Leisure Australia which owned several attractions in the Asia-Pacific region including UnderWater World, Melbourne Aquarium, Falls Creek Alpine Resort, Hotham Alpine Resort, Otway Fly, Illawarra Fly, Busan Aquarium and Siam Ocean World.

=== Public listing (2013–2019) ===
Merlin had planned to go public in the early 2000s, but market turbulence postponed those plans. Instead, Blackstone sold 20% of the company to the private equity firm CVC Capital Partners, reducing Blackstone's holding to 34%. CVC acquired another 8% from the Dubai investment fund which is no longer involved with the company, giving it 28% in all. Kirkbi, a Danish family trust that owns LEGO, also increased its stake, emerging as the largest shareholder, with 36%. CVC paid a price that valued Merlin at £2.25 billion – more than six times what Merlin and Legoland together were worth when Blackstone acquired them five years earlier. Blackstone's investment was by that point worth more than three and a half times what it had paid.

On 8 November 2013, Merlin floated 30% of the company on the London Stock Exchange, valuing the private equity-backed company at almost £3.4bn.

In 2015, the company opened the Orlando Eye Ferris wheel attraction in Orlando. It then sold the wheel in 2018 but repurchased it in 2024.

The freehold of the Madame Tussauds London site was sold again in 2015, to the Taiwanese insurer Fubon Life.

Reports in early October 2017 indicated that Merlin Entertainments was considering a takeover of Sea World in Orlando, but on 11 October, the company said it was no longer involved in such discussions.

=== Return to private ownership (2019–present) ===
In June 2019, the company's board agreed to recommend a takeover offer of £4.8 billion from a consortium consisting of Kirkbi A/S, CPP Investment Board and the Blackstone Group. The takeover was approved by the high court in November 2019.

Merlin opened its first Peppa Pig Theme Park in Winter Haven, Florida in 2022, with future sites planned for Texas and Günzburg, Germany.

Nick Varney left the company at the end of 2022, along with longtime Chief Development Officer, Mark Fisher. Varney was replaced by Scott O'Neil, who arrived from a media and sports management background.

In March 2023, Merlin cancelled a new Legoland resort in Belgium, which had been planned to open in 2027 on the former site of Caterpillar's factory in Gosselies. By the end of 2024, both Little Big City sites in Berlin and Beijing and the Bear Grylls Adventure in Birmingham, UK were closed.

In November of 2024, Merlin entered a $110 million dollar theme park deal with Microsoft, the owners of video game developer Mojang. This deal included themed rides, attractions, hotels, and retail outlets themed after the popular video game Minecraft.

O'Neil left the company at the end of 2024, with Chief Operating Officer, Fiona Eastwood, taking over as CEO. At the same time, the company began a group-wide restructuring to merge its Resort Theme Parks, Legoland Parks and Gateway Attractions divisions on a regional basis, which Merlin stated would bring them into "one united business" going forwards.

In 2025, it was revealed that Merlin were looking to sell many of its Sea Life Centres, but failed to find an attractive offer. In June, it was also announced that the majority of Merlin's Blackpool attractions would be taken over by Blackpool Council through their in-house tourism company Blackpool Tourism Limited. This included the Blackpool Tower, Blackpool Dungeon and Madame Tussauds Blackpool. In September, it was announced that Merlin was to sell its Lego Discovery Centres to the Lego Group, also a part-owned subsidiary of Kirkbi, with an estimated cash consideration of £200 million. The sale was completed on 27 February 2026.

== Properties ==
=== Resort theme parks ===
Name	Location	Year opened	Year acquired	Notes
Gardaland	Castelnuovo del Garda, Italy	1975	2006	Owner and operator; Purchased in 2006 under Blackstone.
Heide Park	Soltau, Lower Saxony, Germany	1978	2007	Operator; Acquired in Tussauds Group deal.
Thorpe Park	(United Kingdom) Chertsey, Surrey, UK	1979	2007	Operator; Acquired in Tussauds Group deal.
Alton Towers	(United Kingdom) Alton, Staffordshire, UK	1980	2007	Operator; Acquired in Tussauds Group deal.
Chessington World of Adventures	(United Kingdom) Chessington, Greater London, UK	1987	2007	Owner and operator; Acquired in Tussauds Group deal.

=== LEGOLAND parks ===
Name	Location	Year opened	Year acquired	Notes
Legoland Billund Resort	Billund, Denmark	1968	2005	Acquired in Blackstone deal.
Legoland Windsor Resort	(United Kingdom) Windsor, UK	1996	2005	Acquired in Blackstone deal.
Legoland California Resort	(United States) Carlsbad, California, U.S.	1999	2005	Acquired in Blackstone deal.
Legoland Deutschland Resort	Günzburg, Germany	2002	2005	Acquired in Blackstone deal.
Legoland Florida Resort	(United States) Winter Haven, Florida, U.S.	2011		Formerly Cypress Gardens.
Legoland Malaysia Resort	Johor Bahru, Malaysia	2012	-	New-build theme park.
Legoland Dubai Resort	Jebel Ali, Dubai, United Arab Emirates	2016	-	Franchised to Dubai Parks and Resorts
Legoland Japan Resort	Nagoya, Japan	2017	-	New-build theme park.
Legoland New York Resort	(United States) Goshen, New York, U.S.	2021	-	New-build theme park.
Legoland Korea Resort	Chuncheon, South Korea	2022	-	New-build theme park.
Legoland Shanghai Resort	Jinshan, Shanghai, China	2025	-	New-build theme park.

=== Peppa Pig parks (co-products with Hasbro) ===
Name	Location	Year opened	Year acquired	Notes
Peppa Pig Theme Park Florida	(United States) Winter Haven, Florida	2022	-	New-build theme park.
Peppa Pig Park Günzburg	(Germany) Günzburg, Bavaria	2024	-	New-build theme park.
Peppa Pig Theme Park Dallas-Fort Worth	(United States) North Richland Hills, Texas	2025	-	New-build theme park.

=== Gateway attractions ===
Name	Location(s)	Year opened	Year acquired	Notes
Cadbury World	(United Kingdom) Birmingham, UK	1990	2023	Management contract only.
The Dungeons	(United Kingdom) Blackpool (United Kingdom) London (United Kingdom) York (United Kingdom) Edinburgh (Germany) Berlin (Germany) Hamburg (Netherlands) Amsterdam	2011; 1974; 1986; 2000; 2013; 2000; 2005	1999	Brand & pre-1999 sites acquired in management buyout of Vardon Attractions. Blackpool site franchise only from August 2025.
The Eye Brand	(United Kingdom) London (Australia) Sydney (United States) Orlando	2000; 1981; 2015	2007; 2011; 2024	
The Gruffalo & Friends Clubhouse	(United Kingdom) Blackpool	2023		
DreamWorks Tours: Shrek's Adventure!	(United Kingdom) London	2015	-	Shrek franchise licensed from Universal Pictures and DreamWorks Animation Studios.
Madame Tussauds	(United Kingdom) London (United Kingdom) Blackpool (Czech Republic) Prague (Austria) Vienna (Germany) Berlin (Netherlands) Amsterdam (Hungary) Budapest (United States) Hollywood (United States) Las Vegas (United States) Nashville (United States) New York (United States) Orlando (Australia) Sydney (China) Shanghai (China) Wuhan; Hong Kong (Japan) Tokyo; Singapore (Thailand) Bangkok (United Arab Emirates) Dubai		2007	Brand & pre-2007 sites acquired in Tussauds Group merger. China sites (with exception of Hong Kong), Prague and Budapest are franchise only. Blackpool site franchise only from August 2025.
Peppa Pig World of Play	(China) Shanghai (United States) Auburn Hills, Michigan (United States) Grapevine, Texas (United States) Chicago, Illinois (Netherlands) Leidschendam	2018; 2019; 2019; 2020; 2022		Shanghai site franchise only.
Sea Life	(United Kingdom) Birmingham (United Kingdom) Blackpool (United Kingdom) Brighton (United Kingdom) Great Yarmouth (United Kingdom) Gweek (United Kingdom) Hunstanton (United Kingdom) Manchester (United Kingdom) London (United Kingdom) Scarborough (United Kingdom) Weymouth (United Kingdom) Loch Lomond (Belgium) Blankenberge (Germany) Hanover (Germany) Konstanz (Germany) Munich (Germany) Oberhausen (Germany) Speyer (Germany) Timmendorfer Strand (Finland) Helsinki (Italy) Castelnuovo del Garda (Italy) Jesolo (Netherlands) Scheveningen (Portugal) Porto (Spain) Benalmadena (France) Paris (United States) Arizona (United States) Orlando (United States) New Jersey (United States) San Antonio (Australia) Melbourne (Australia) Mooloolaba (Sunshine Coast) (Australia) Sydney (New Zealand) Auckland (China) Shanghai (Japan) Nagoya (Malaysia) Iskandar Puteri (South Korea) Busan (Thailand) Bangkok		1999	Brand & pre-1999 sites acquired in management buyout of Vardon Attractions. Shanghai site franchise only.
Warwick Castle	United Kingdom	1978	2007	Acquired in Tussauds Group merger.

=== Future locations ===
Name	Location	Planned opening
Legoland Sichuan	Chengdu, Sichuan, China	2025
Legoland Shenzhen Resort	Shenzhen, China	2027
Legoland Beijing Resort	Fangshan District, Beijing, China	2028

=== Former locations ===
Name	Location	Opened	Acquired	Fate	Closed/sold	Notes
Abenteuer Park Oberhausen	Oberhausen, Germany	1996	2011	Closed	2015	Formerly known as CentrO.Park (1996–2011) & Sea Life Abenteuer Park (2013).
The Bear Grylls Adventure	(United Kingdom) Birmingham, UK	2018		Closed	2024	
Blackpool Tower	(United Kingdom) Blackpool, UK	1894	2011		2025	Management contract from Blackpool Council from 2011. Take-over by Blackpool Tourism Ltd in August 2025.
Earth Explorer	Ostend, Belgium	2004		Sold	2013	
Falls Creek ski resort	Victoria, Australia	1946	2011	Sold	2019	Acquired in MFS Living and Leisure deal. Sold to Vail Resorts in 2019.
Hotham Alpine Resort	Victoria, Australia	1925	2011	Sold	2019	Ski resort acquired in MFS Living and Leisure deal. Sold to Vail Resorts in 2019.
Illawarra Fly	Australia	2005	2016	Sold	2024	
Little Big City	Berlin, Germany; Beijing, China	2017; 2018		Closed	2024	
Legoland Discovery Centre Duisburg	Duisburg, Germany	2007		Closed	2013	Moved to Oberhausen after a few years.
Legoland Discovery Centre Hotham	(Australia) Mt Hotham, AZ at Hotham Alpine Resort	2018		Closed	2018	
Legoland Discovery Centre Istanbul	(Turkey) Istanbul	2015		Closed	2024	
LEGO Discovery Centres	(United Kingdom) Birmingham at Arena Birmingham (United Kingdom) Manchester at the Trafford Centre (Germany) Berlin at The Center Potsdamer Platz (Germany) Hamburg (Germany) Oberhausen (United States) Phoenix at Arizona Mills (United States) Atlanta at Phipps Plaza (United States) Bay Area (San Jose) at Great Mall of the Bay Area (United States); Boston (United States) Chicago at The Streets of Woodfield (United States) Columbus at Easton Town Center (United States) Dallas Fort Worth at Grapevine Mills (United States) Kansas City at Crown Center (United States) Michigan at the Great Lakes Crossing Outlets (United States) New Jersey at American Dream Meadowlands (United States) Philadelphia at the Plymouth Meeting Mall (United States) Westchester (New York) at Westchester's Ridge Hill (United States) Washington at Springfield Town Center (United States) San Antonio at the Shops at Rivercenter (Canada) Toronto at Vaughan Mills (Australia) Melbourne at the Chadstone Shopping Centre; Hong Kong (Japan) Osaka (Japan) Tokyo (Netherlands) Scheveningen (Belgium) Brussels			Sold	2026	All sold to Lego Group in February 2026.
London Planetarium	(United Kingdom) London	1958	2007	Closed	2010	Incorporated as part of Madame Tussauds London as other attractions.
Madame Tussauds Delhi	(India) New Delhi	2017		Closed	2020	Closed after COVID-19 pandemic, relocated to Noida in 2022.
Madame Tussauds Washington DC	(United States) Washington D.C.	2007		Closed	2021	Closed after COVID-19 pandemic, never re-opened.
Madame Tussauds India at DLF Mall of India	(India) Noida	2022		Closed	2023	Relocated from Madame Tussauds Delhi.
Madame Tussauds San Francisco	(United States) San Francisco	2014		Closed	2024	
Madame Tussauds Istanbul	(Turkey) Istanbul	2016		Closed	2024	
Madame Tussauds Chongqing	(China) Chongqing	2016		Closed	2025	
Madame Tussauds Beijing	(China) Beijing	2014		Closed	2025	
Otway Fly	Australia	2003	2016	Sold	2024	
Peter Rabbit: Explore and Play	(United Kingdom) Blackpool	2022			2025	Take-over by Blackpool Tourism Ltd in August 2025.
The San Francisco Dungeon	(United States) San Francisco	2014		Closed	2022	Closed in 2020 due to the COVID-19 pandemic, never re-opened.
The Shanghai Dungeon	(China) Shanghai	2018		Closed	2024	
Sea Life Berlin	(Germany) Berlin			Closed	2024	
Sea Life Bray Aquarium	(Republic of Ireland) Bray, Ireland	1998		Closed	2023	
Sea Life Hastings	(United Kingdom) Hastings, England	2008		Sold	2012	Now belongs to the Blue Reef Aquarium chain.
Sea Life Istanbul	(Turkey) Istanbul	2009		Closed	2024	
Sea Life Königswinter	(Germany) Königswinter			Closed	2023	
Sea Life St Andrews	(United Kingdom) St Andrews, Scotland	1999	TBA	Sold	TBA	Now operates as the St. Andrews Aquarium.
Manly Sea Life Sanctuary	Manly, Australia	1965	2010	Closed	2018	
Scottish Sea Life Sanctuary	(United Kingdom) Oban, Scotland	1979		Closed	2018	
