= Grapevine Mills =

Shopping mall in Tarrant County, Texas, U.S.

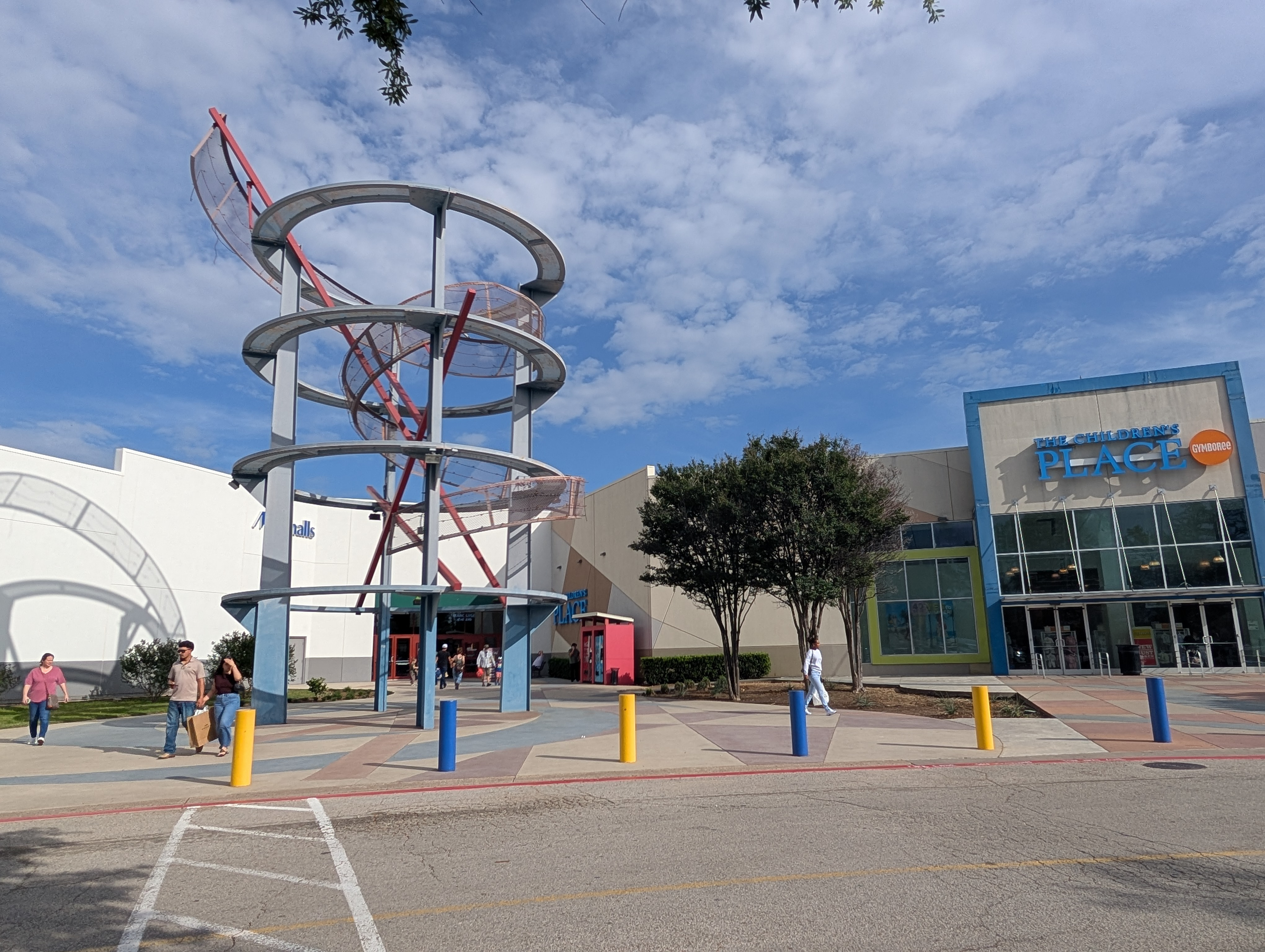
- Entry 4 and The Children's Place (April 2026)
- Location: Grapevine, Texas, U.S.
- Coordinates: 32°57′58″N 97°2′34″W
- Address: 3000 Grapevine Mills Parkway
- Opened: October 30, 1997; 29 years ago
- Renovated: 2014–2016
- Developer: The Mills Corporation; Simon DeBartolo Group; KanAm Group
- Manager: Simon Premium Outlets; The Mills: A Simon Company
- Owner: Simon Property Group (59.3%); KanAm Group (40.7%)
- Num. of stores: 210+ (at peak)
- Num. of anchor tenants: 22 (at peak)
- Floor area: 1,779,663 square feet (165,336.1 m^{2})
- Floors: 1
- Website: www.simon.com/mall/grapevine-mills/
- Building details
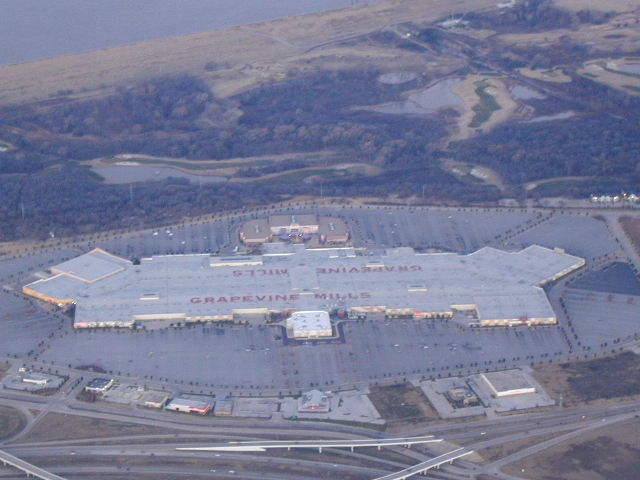
- Aerial photograph of the mall, as viewed from Dallas Fort Worth International Airport

General information
- Status: Operational
- Construction started: June 26, 1996; 30 years ago
- Completed: 1997

Renovating team
- Architect: Omniplan Architects
- Renovating firm: Simon Property Group

Grapevine Mills is a super-regional shopping mall in Grapevine, Texas, United States, in the Dallas-Fort Worth metroplex. The single-floor mall is located on State Highway 121 near Grapevine Lake, 2 miles (3.2 km) north of Dallas/Fort Worth International Airport. At nearly 1.8 million square feet (170,000 m^{2}) in size, it is the largest mall in Tarrant County.

The mall has its grand opening in October 1997 by the Mills Corporation and as of April 2007 is operated by Simon Property Group, which owns 59.3% of it. The remaining shares are owned by KanAm of Germany. Like most Mills malls, Grapevine Mills contains a mixture of off-price retailers, restaurants, and entertainment venues. The mall is home to Legoland Discovery Center Dallas Fort Worth, Sea Life Grapevine, and the Meow Wolf art exhibition The Real Unreal.

== History ==
=== 1996–2002: Development, opening, and early years ===
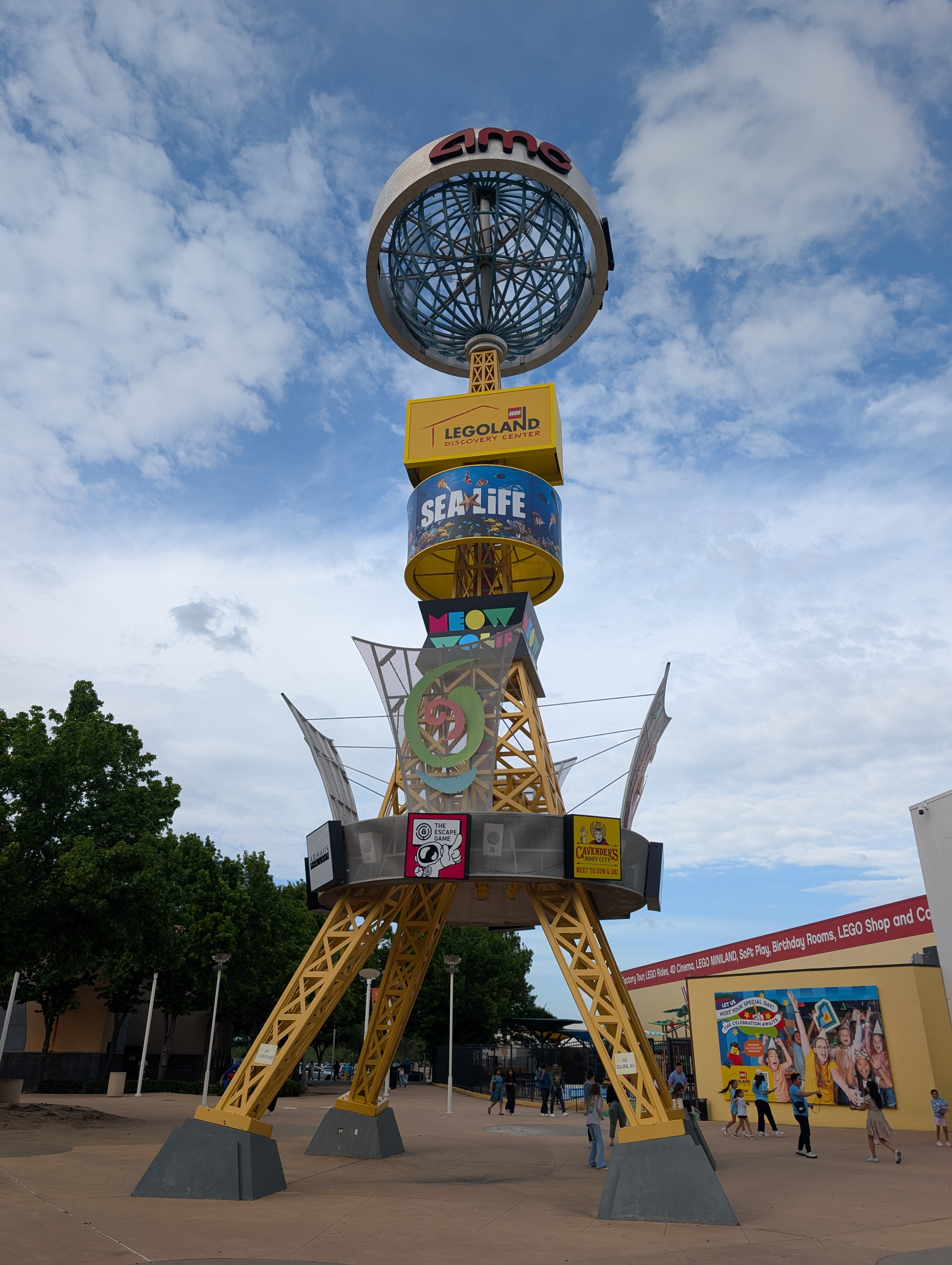
Eiffel Tower-shaped sign in entertainment zone plaza listing major tenants (April 2026)

The Grapevine Mills outlet mall proposal was approved by city officials on January 16, 1996, and construction on the mall began on June 26, 1996. The mall would follow the Mills Corporation's Landmark Mills "shoppertainment" model, blending retail outlets with entertainment venues.

The mall had its grand opening on October 30, 1997, developed as a joint venture between the Mills Corporation, KanAm Group of Germany, and Simon DeBartolo Group of Indianapolis, Indiana. AMC Theatres Grapevine Mills 30 opened later on December 19, 1997.

In December 1999, it was announced that the Polar Ice Skating Rink opened at the mall. On August 23, 2001, The Mills Corp. partnered with ESPN, LLC, and announced that an ESPN X Games Skate Park would open at Grapevine Mills.

In July 2002, Simon Property Group sold its shares in the mall. In December 2002, the ESPN X Games Skate Park opened, with 40,000 sq ft (3,700 m^{2}).

=== 2007–2016: Simon Property Group ===
After being investigated by the Securities & Exchange Commission (SEC) in May 2006, The Mills Corp. and its portfolio were acquired by Simon Property Group and Farallon Capital Management for $1.64 billion in April 2007. After the acquisition, Mills was rebranded The Mills: A Simon Company.

In December 2009, Simon Property Group announced that Merlin Entertainments would add Legoland Discovery Center inside the mall. It opened on March 25, 2011, with 35,000 square feet (3,300 m^{2}) inside the space that had housed Woodward Skatepark, which replaced ESPN X Games. Lego-themed attractions included an interactive laser ride, a 3D movie and a play area for kids.

In May 2010, Simon announced plans to build the Sea Life Grapevine aquarium. It was constructed across from the new Legoland in the former space of the GameWorks video game arcade, and opened on July 12, 2011, with over 30 displays, a 160,000 US gallons (610,000 L) tank with a tunnel for guests to walk through and a tide pool where visitors could interact with certain animals. In October 2011, the city council approved an expansion of Legoland at the mall, while SB Capital Group announced that JCPenney Outlet Store would be converted into JC's 5 Star Outlet after JCPenney sold its outlet division to focus on its core operations. In March 2012, Simon Property Group acquired full control of the property's management by buying out Farallon's stake in 26 Landmark Mills malls for $1.5 billion. In June 2012, the City of Grapevine approved $14 million for renovations of the mall, based on the newly-renovated Opry Mills mall in Nashville, Tennessee. In October 2013, it was announced that JC's 5 Star Outlet would permanently close all of its stores on December 31, 2013, due to declining sales.

Simon Property Group announced renovation plans for Grapevine Mills in April 2014, which began construction in August 2014, and was completed in June 2016, which included the redevelopment of Grapevine Mills' food court into the Dining Pavilion @ Grapevine Mills, and the removal of the mall's original "Wild West" theme. New stores were added, such as Michael Kors, Under Armour, Coach, and H&M. The architect of the renovation was local firm Omniplan, and a 78,300 sq ft (7,270 m^{2}) Round1 Bowling & Arcade later debuted at the mall in July 2016, as the company's largest location in Texas.

=== 2017–present ===
In January 2017, FieldhouseUSA, an indoor sports facility, debuted, and the first Peppa Pig World of Play store in the United States opened at the mall in February 2019. All Simon properties in the U.S., including Grapevine Mills, closed temporarily on March 18, 2020, due to the COVID-19 pandemic. On May 11, 2022, Meow Wolf announced that The Real Unreal would arrive at Grapevine Mills, which later opened on July 14, 2023.

On October 19, 2024, Pepper Tree was forced to close due to $19,000 in unpaid rent. By December 2024, what was open at Grapevine Mills included Gorski Montréal, Cavender's, Gashapon, and Go! Calenders, Toys & Games. Below Zero would open in the former Perfect Bodies Colombian Favas space. Marc Robinson Jewelers replaced Treasures Custom Jeweler. Perfumania relocated its store.

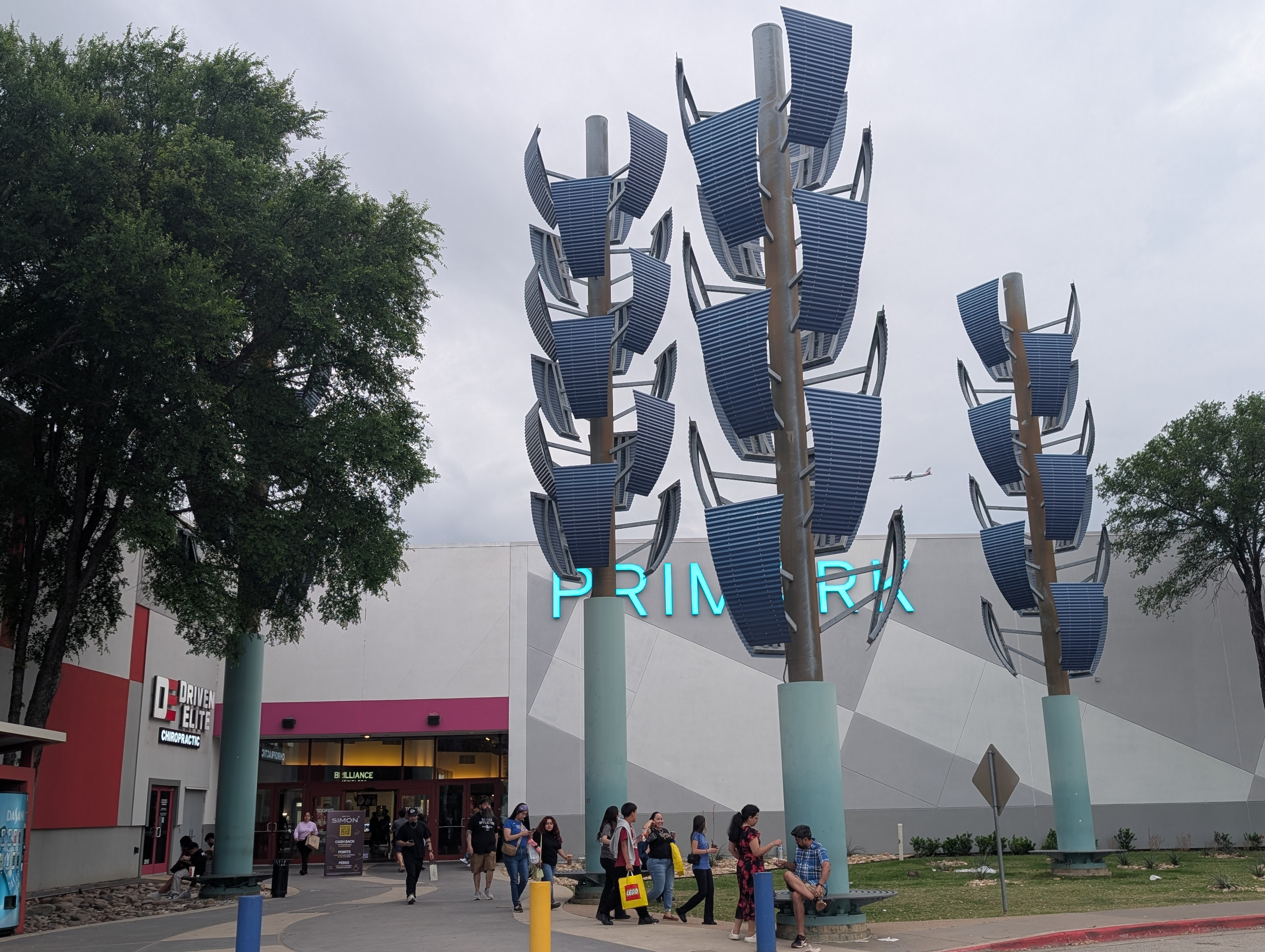
Primark at Entry 3 (April 2026)

Starting in February 2025, with an expected finish date at July 2025, Burlington downsized and renovated its store at Grapevine Mills. The space Burlington vacated was sectioned off and converted into a Primark. On October 16, 2025, Bubble Planet, an immersive experience, would debut.

In late January 2026, Neiman Marcus Last Call announced that it would close its Grapevine Mills store permanently. This is because the parent company, Saks Global, filed for Chapter 11 bankruptcy. However, Saks Off 5th (Note: The outlet division of Saks Fifth Avenue, which Saks Global also owns.) would remain open as the chain's last remaining Texas location. On March 30, 2026, Timberland announced to open a location at the mall. On June 2, 2026, the Grapevine City Council unanimously voted to approve a zoning change and conditional use permit for a mixed-use development project near Grapevine Mills, after they initially rejected a similar proposal on May 19, 2026.

Timberland did not open until August 28, 2026. Moda opened on September 10, 2026, followed by Flip Flop Shoes on September 24, 2026, Latte Factory on September 26, 2026, and Ulta Beauty on November 6, 2026.

== Gallery ==
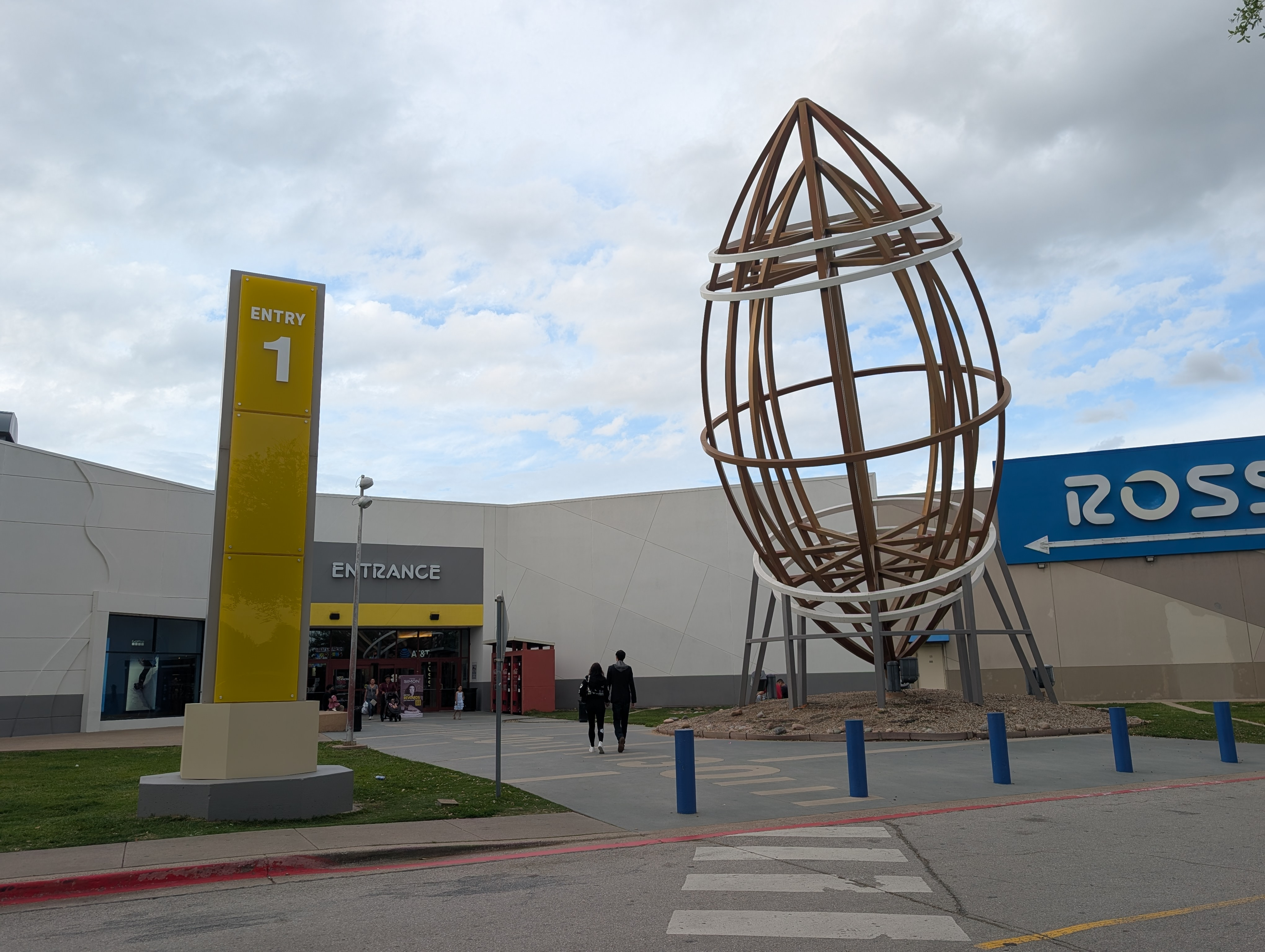
Entry 1 and Ross Dress For Less (April 2026)

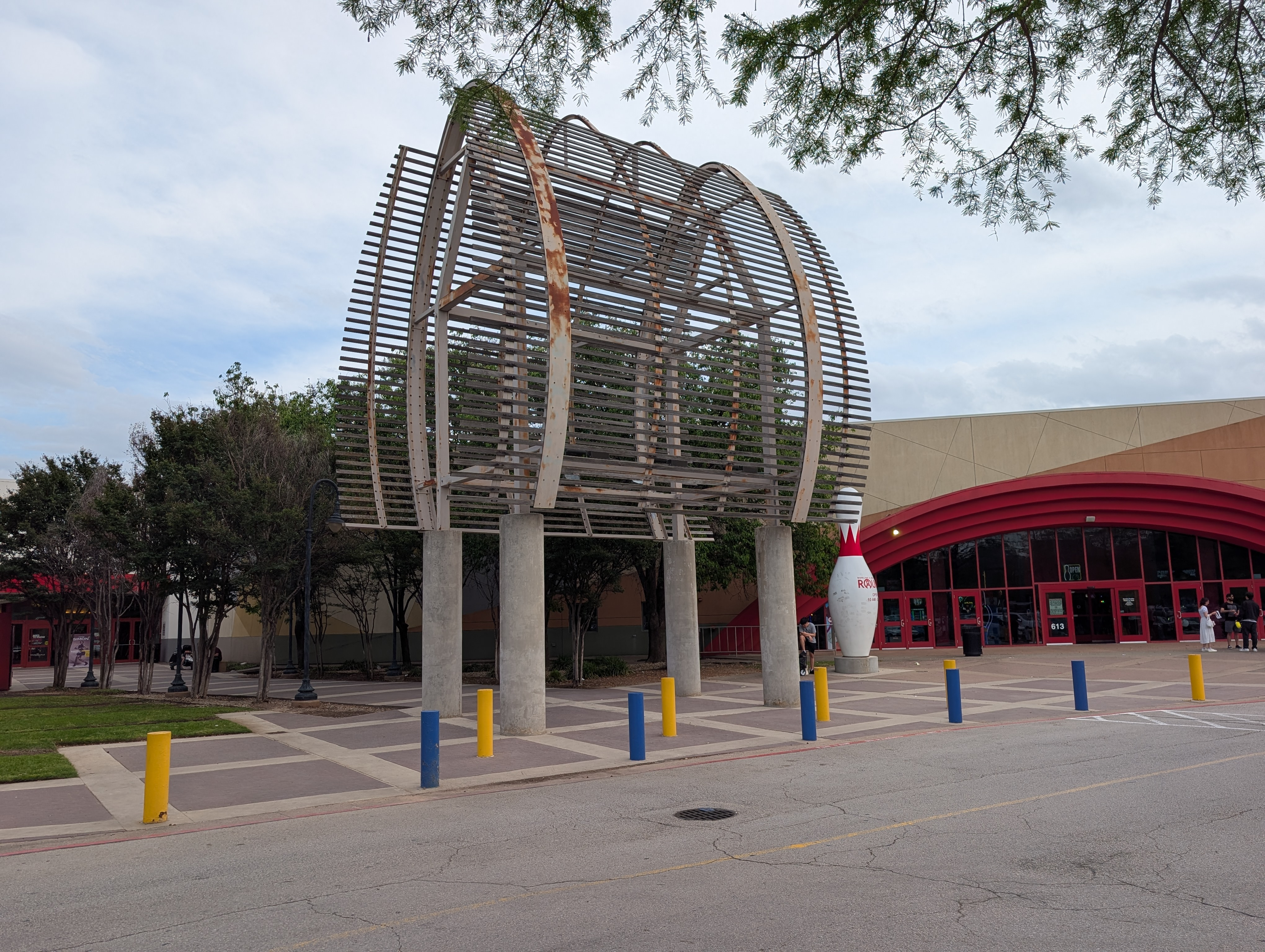
Entry 6 and Round1 (April 2026)

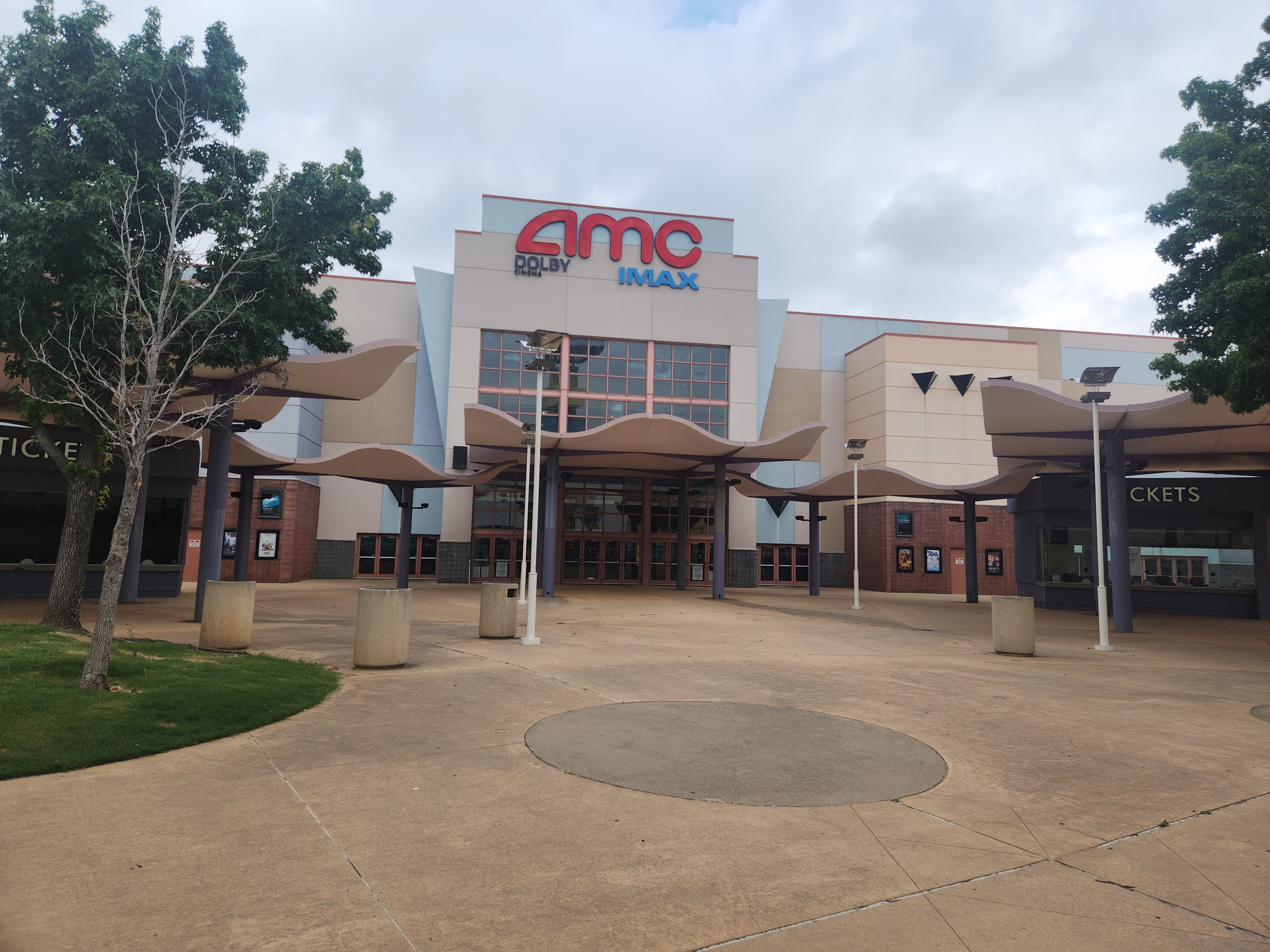
AMC Grapevine Mills and IMAX, later downsized to 24 screens (June 2024)

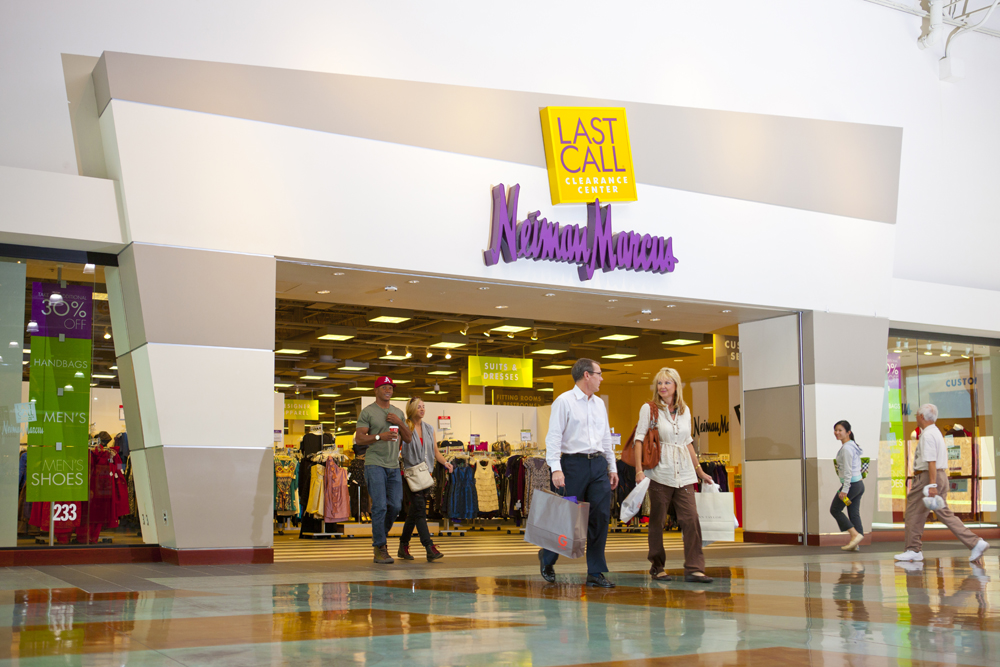
Former Neiman Marcus Last Call (November 2011)

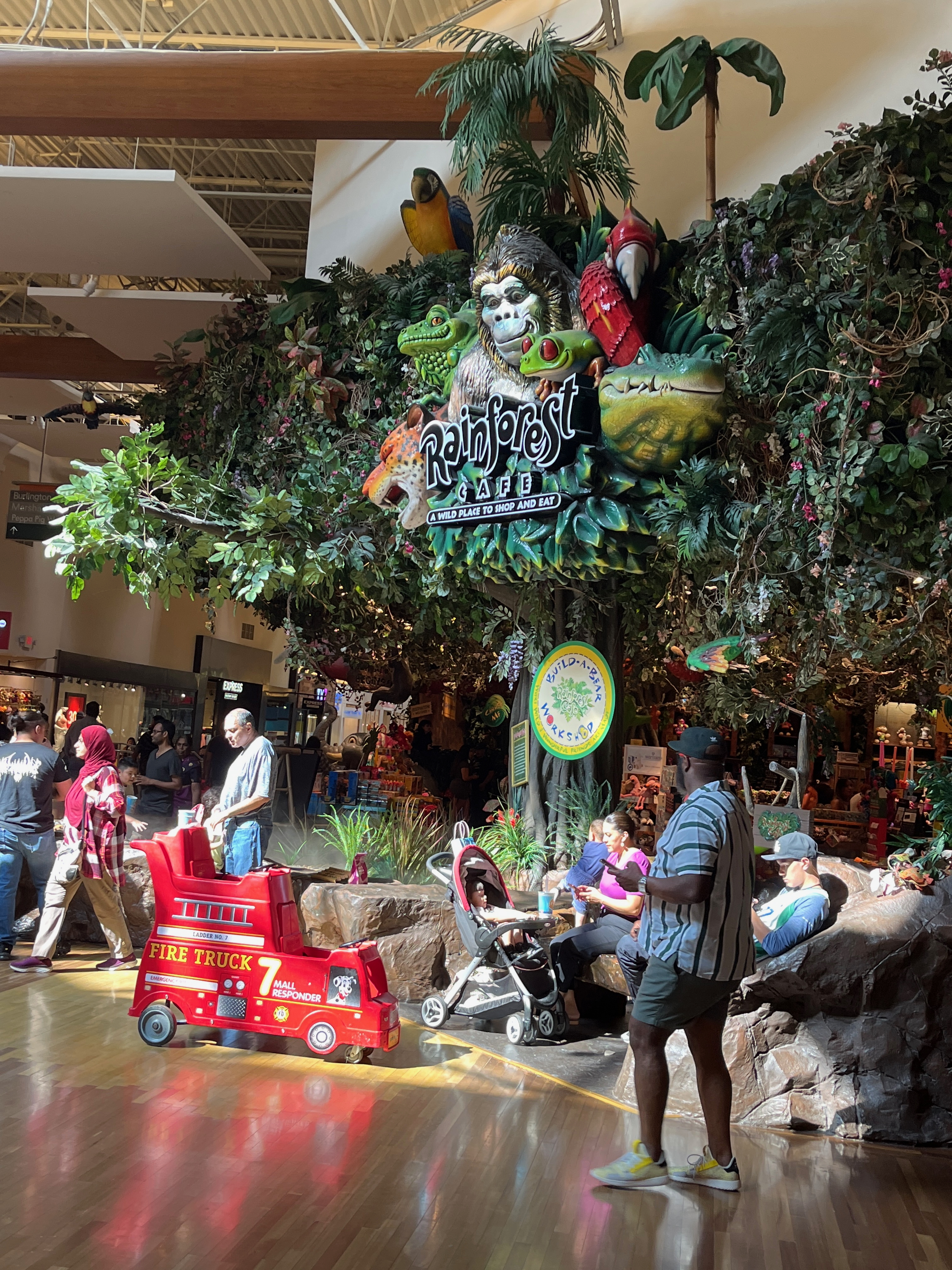
Rainforest Cafe (September 2022)

Entry 2 next to H&M (April 2026)

== See also ==
- Katy Mills in Fort Bend County
- North East Mall
- List of shopping malls in the Dallas/Fort Worth Metroplex
