= Madame Tussauds Vienna =

Wax museum in Austria

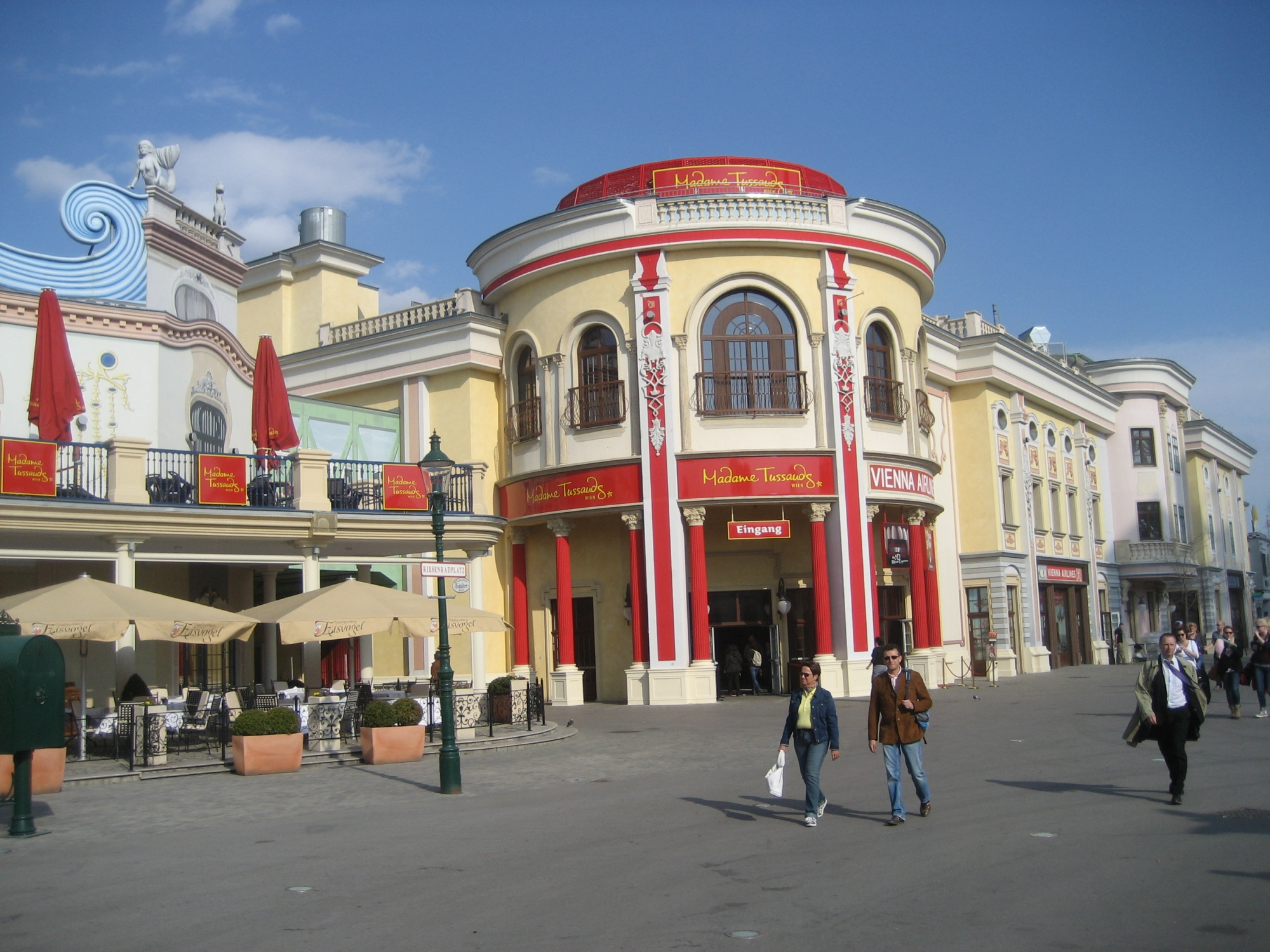

Vienna, Austria
- Coordinates: 48.217222°N 16.396389°E
- Status: Operating
- Opening date: 2011

Ride statistics
- Attraction type: Wax museum
- Website: https://www.madametussauds.com/vienna

Madame Tussauds Vienna is a wax museum and tourist attraction located at the famous amusement park Wiener Prater in Vienna, Austria. It was founded by Marie Tussaud and is the twelfth location for the Tussauds franchise. It officially opened on 1 April 2011 by the former Austrian president Heinz Fischer. So far, it features more than 90 figures on three floors. Madame Tussauds is now owned and operated by the United Kingdom-based entertainment company Merlin Entertainments.

== Wax figures ==
=== Sections ===
Madame Tussauds Vienna currently consists of more than 90 wax figures. These are divided into the following sections (some of the notable figures are listed):

- History section: Marie Tussaud, Maria Theresia, Marie Antoinette, Napoleon, Leopold Figl, Anne Frank - among others
- Politicians and Visionaries section: Barack Obama, Queen Elizabeth II, Dalai Lama, Mahatma Gandhi, Heinz Fischer - among others
- Arts and Culture section: Wolfgang Amadeus Mozart, Ludwig van Beethoven, Luciano Pavarotti, Gustav Klimt, Albert Einstein, Friedensreich Hundertwasser, Sigmund Freud, Gottfried Helnwein - among others
- Sports section: Hermann Maier, Franz Klammer (portrayed as former young skiing athlete), Hans Krankl and Herbert Prohaska (both portrayed as former young soccer players), Stefan Kraft, David Alaba, Dominic Thiem - among others
- Music section: Katy Perry, CRO, Taylor Swift, One Direction, Andreas Gabalier, Freddie Mercury, Falco, Udo Jürgens, Michael Jackson, Hansi Hinterseer, Demi Lovato, Elvis Presley - among others
- Film section: Marilyn Monroe, Alfred Hitchcock, Daniel Craig as James Bond, Julie Andrews as Maria von Trapp of The Sound of Music, Marlene Dietrich, Quentin Tarantino, Brad Pitt, Romy Schneider - among others
- Hollywood Room/Party section: Benedict Cumberbatch, Justin Bieber, Lady Gaga, Johnny Depp, Chris Hemsworth, Zendaya, Rihanna, Sandra Bullock, Conchita Wurst, Kate Winslet, Robert Pattinson, Morgan Freeman, Angelina Jolie, Will Smith, George Clooney - among others
- Sisi Uncovered Experience section: Sisi, Franz Joseph I
