= Legoland Discovery Center Dallas Fort Worth =

Indoor family entertainment center

Coordinates: 32.966641°N 97.043481°W

Legoland Discovery Center Dallas/Fort Worth
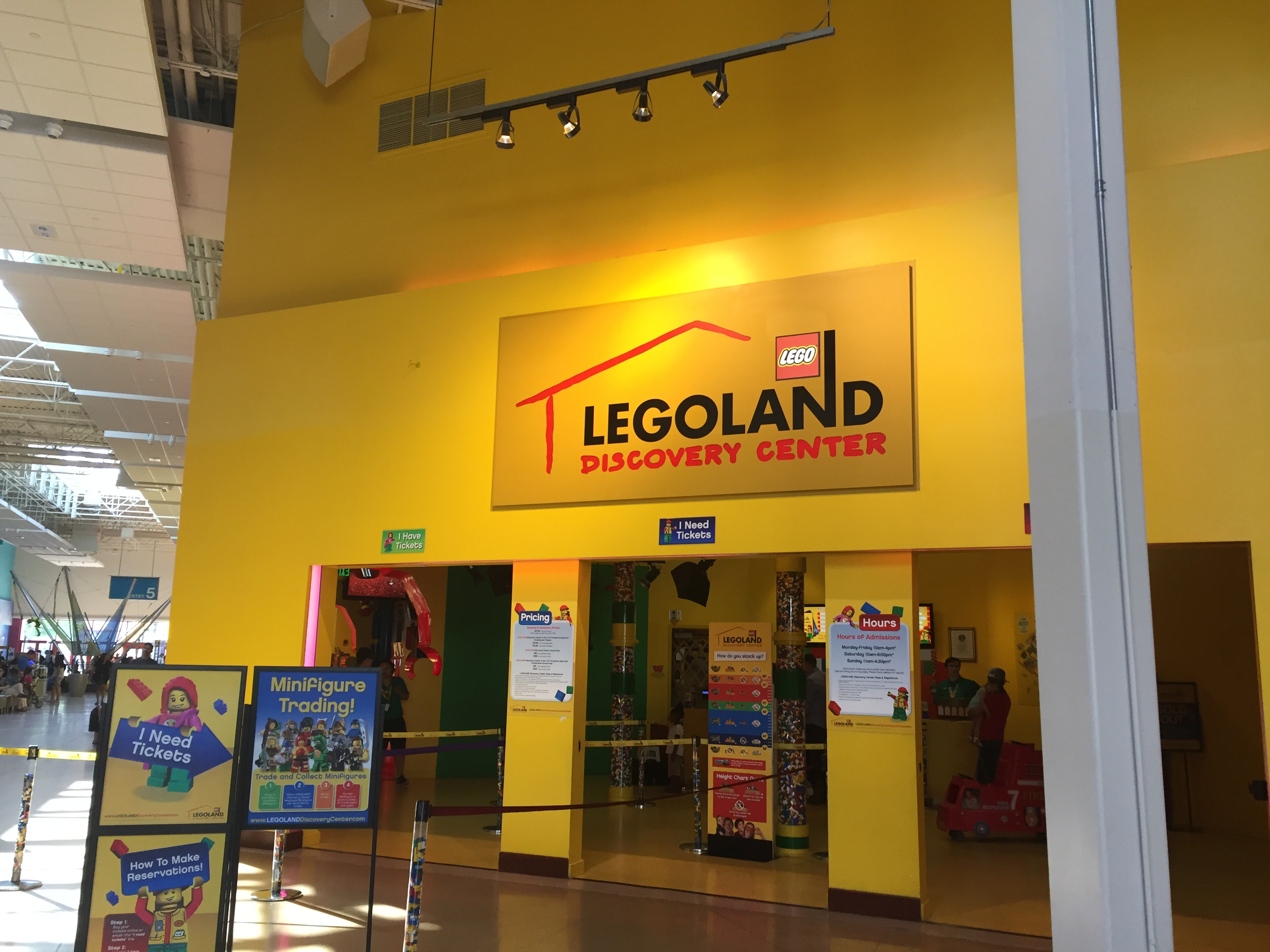
- Mall entrance to Legoland Discovery Center Dallas Fort Worth in April 2018
- Interactive map of Legoland Discovery Center Dallas/Fort Worth
- Location: Grapevine Mills, Grapevine, Texas, United States
- Status: Operating
- Operated by: The Lego Group
- Theme: Family Entertainment Center
- Website: https://www.legolanddiscoverycenter.com/dallasfw/

Legoland Discovery Center Dallas Fort Worth is an indoor family entertainment center located at Grapevine Mills mall in Grapevine, Texas, which is situated between the cities of Dallas and Fort Worth, Texas. The attraction includes Lego-theme rides, a soft play area, a 4D cinema and a gift shop. The center is operated by The Lego Group, and formerly Merlin Entertainments.

== History ==
Lego bricks were invented by Danish carpenter Ole Kirk Christiansen in 1958. The first Legoland Discovery Center was opened in Berlin in 2007, and since then a total of 12 Legoland Discovery Centers have been opened. Legoland Discovery Center Dallas Fort Worth was opened in March 2011.

== Rides & Attractions ==
- Ninjago Training Camp including ninja missions and a laser maze
- Lego Factory Tour where visitors can learn how LEGO bricks are made
- Lego 4D Cinema showing 4D films featuring popular LEGO characters throughout the day
- Kingdom Quest Laser Ride where visitors must zap the ogres, rats and cats and keep an eye out for treasure chests
- Lego City: Forest Ranger Pursuit where children can drive off-road Lego vehicles to capture the robbers
- Pirate Beach water playground featuring water jets, slides, interactive models, and a soft play area
- A Lego replica of the local area in Miniland
- An area where visitors can build and test Lego Racers
- Merlin's Apprentice Ride where visitors can pedal to lift off the ground and look over the rest of Legoland Discovery Center Dallas/ Fort Worth
- The Legoland Discovery Center Shop with over 900 products
- Lego Friends Heartlake City building area
- Duplo Village featuring a play slide, large animal models, and Duplo bricks to build with
- Café
- Birthday rooms

== Former Rides and Attractions ==
- Lego City Play Zone & Fire Academy featuring a jungle gym, climbing wall and slide (became Ninjago city)
- Lego Girls Princess Palace where children can build their own microphone and perform on the karaoke stage
- Visitors can build a Lego tower and test its strength on the Earthquake Tables
