= Legoland Discovery Center Kansas City =

Indoor family entertainment center

- Interactive map of Legoland Discovery Center Kansas City
- Location: Crown Center, Kansas City, Missouri, United States
- Coordinates: 39.0818625°N 94.5817603°W
- Status: Operating
- Owner: Merlin Entertainments
- Website: https://www.legolanddiscoverycenter.com/kansascity/

Legoland Discovery Center Kansas City is an indoor family entertainment center located in the Crown Center in Kansas City, Missouri. The attraction includes Lego rides, a soft play area, a 4D cinema, and a gift shop. It is owned and operated by the British leisure company Merlin Entertainments.

== History ==
The first Legoland Discovery Centre was opened in Berlin in 2007, and since then a total of 12 Legoland Discovery Centres have been opened. LEGOLAND® Discovery Center Kansas City was opened in 2012.

== Rides & attractions ==
- Lego Factory Tour, where visitors can learn how Lego bricks are made
- Lego 4D Cinema, showing 4D films featuring Lego characters throughout the day
- Kingdom Quest Laser Ride, where visitors must zap ogres, rats, and cats and look for treasure chests
- A Lego replica of the local area in Miniland
- Merlin's Apprentice Ride, where visitors pedal to lift off the ground and look over the rest of the center
- Lego Master Builder Academy, which offers classes with professional model builders
- The Legoland Discovery Center Shop, selling over 900 products
- Duplo Village, including a play slide, large animal models, and Lego Duplo bricks
- The Earthquake Tables, where visitors can test the strength of their Lego towers
- Lego Friends Stephanie, Olivia, Andrea, Mia, and Emma
- A karaoke stage, where visitors can build a Lego microphone and perform
- Café serving food, drinks, and snacks
- Birthday Rooms, for exclusive use as part of the center's Party Package
- Lego City Play Zone, featuring the Fire Academy, Coastguard Tower, and Construction Site
