= Sea Life Arizona =

Aquarium in Tempe, Maricopa County, Arizona

- Interactive map of Sea Life Arizona
- 33°23′05″N 111°57′48″W
- Location: Tempe, Arizona
- Land area: 26,000 sq ft (2,400 m^{2})
- Owner: Merlin Entertainments
- Website: www.visitsealife.com/arizona

Sea Life Arizona is a 26,000-square-foot (2,400-square-metre) interactive aquarium located at Arizona Mills mall in Tempe, Arizona. The aquarium contains thousands of aquatic creatures, plus interactive touch pools and a 360° ocean tunnel. Sea Life Arizona is owned and operated by Merlin Entertainments, which operates over forty other aquariums in eleven countries on 4 continents. Eight of these are in the United States.

== Main species ==
Whitetip reef shark		Hermit crab	Angel fish	Blacktip reef shark
Lined seahorse	Clown triggerfish	Atlantic ray	Cownose ray	Jellyfish
Brown shark	Clownfish	Green sea turtle	Lionfish	Starfish
Cleaner shrimp	Cowfish	Yellow tang fish	Blue tang fish	

== Conservation ==
Sea Life Arizona provides permanent homes for injured or disabled aquatic creatures who would have otherwise been killed or euthanized. In 2002 the facility became the home of an endangered green sea turtle named Ziva, who was placed in the Tempe aquarium's 161,000 gallon display.

Sea Life aquariums worldwide breed many species of seahorse, which are at risk of extinction because of overfishing and trade. Some Sea Life facilities also have seahorse exhibits to educate visitors about the creatures and their threatened status.
