= Sea Life Grapevine =

- Interactive map of Sea Life Grapevine
- Location: Grapevine, Texas
- Owner: Merlin Entertainments
- Website: www.visitsealife.com/grapevine/

Sea Life Grapevine is an interactive aquarium located at Grapevine Mills in Grapevine, Texas. The aquarium contains thousands of aquatic creatures, plus interactive touch pools and a 360° ocean tunnel. Sea Life Grapevine is owned and operated by Merlin Entertainments.

== Main species ==
| Whitetip reef shark | Great Pacific octopus | Hermit crab | Angel fish | Blacktip reef shark |
| Lined seahorse | Clown triggerfish | Atlantic stingray | Cownose ray | Jellyfish |
| Brown shark | Clownfish | Green sea turtle | Lionfish | Starfish |
| Cleaner shrimp | Cowfish | Yellow tang fish | Regal blue tang fish | |

== Protection of turtles ==
A fundraising campaign run by Sea Life has enabled a new Sea Turtle Rescue and Wildlife Information Centre to be built on the Greek island of Zakynthos to treat turtles who have been injured in collisions with pleasure craft or entanglement in fishing gear.
