= Tilt (arcade) =

Video arcade chain inside shopping malls

- Type: Private
- Industry: Entertainment
- Founded: 1972; Arlington, Texas (as Tilt); 2010; Indianapolis, Indiana (as Tilt Studio)
- Founder: Craig Singer
- Headquarters: Celina, Texas
- Number of locations: 16 Tilt Studio locations, 5 Tilt Arcade locations, 4 Tilted 10 locations (as of 2026)
- Area served: United States
- Key people: Craig B. Singer (founder and chairman); Ron Kostelny (president)
- Owner: Singer family
- Parent: Nickels and Dimes Incorporated
- Website: tiltstudio.com

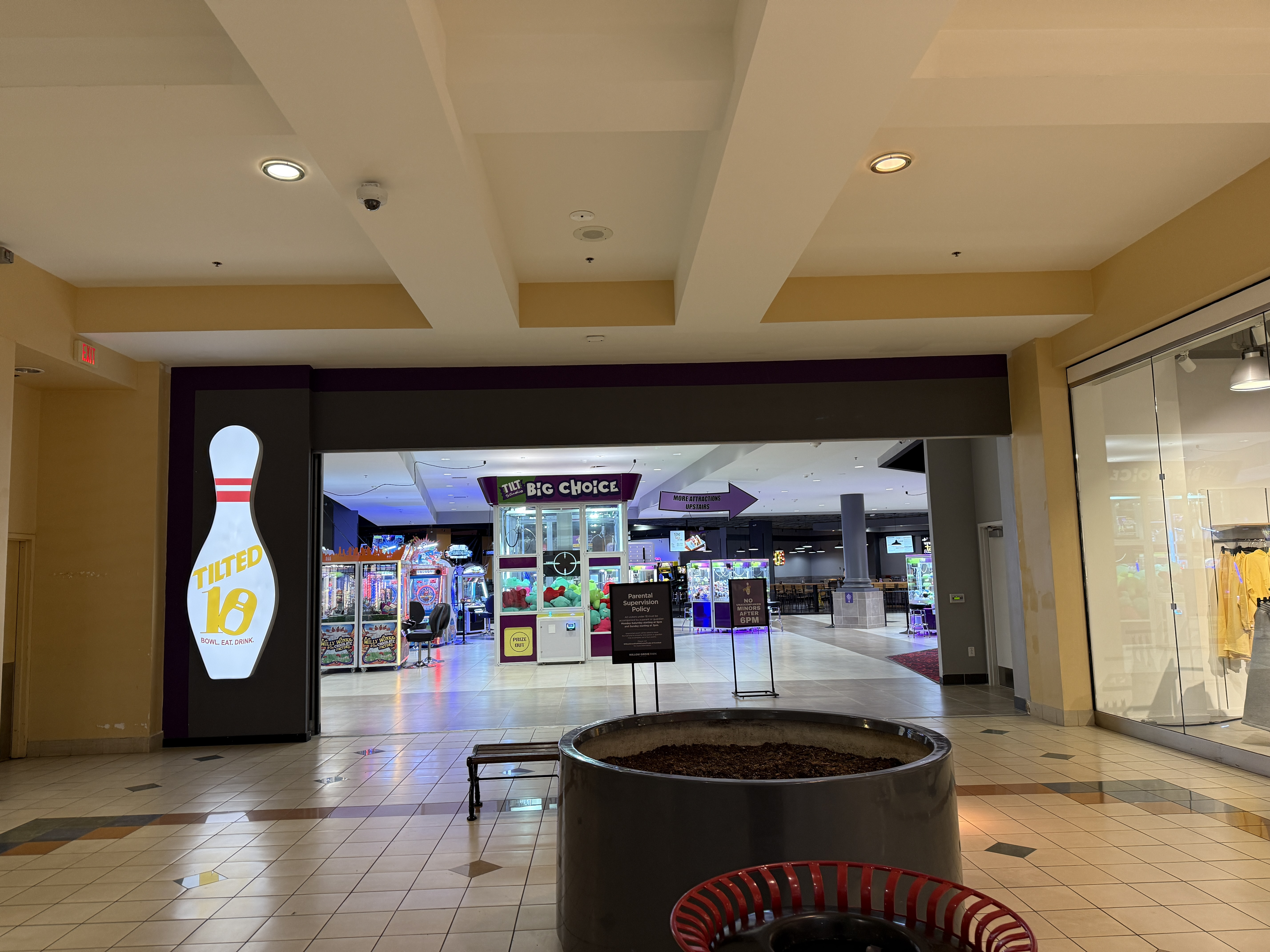
Tilted 10 in the Willow Grove Park Mall in Willow Grove, Pennsylvania

Tilt, also known as Tilt Studio or Tilt Arcade, is a chain of video arcades once found inside various shopping malls across the United States. Tilt is owned by Nickels and Dimes Incorporated (NDI), founded in Carrollton, Texas and currently headquartered in Celina, Texas.

The first Tilt game room opened in the Six Flags Mall in 1972. It was founded by Craig Singer.

At its peak, the chain had roughly 200 locations from Hawaii to New York, and three in New South Wales, Australia (Manly Fun Pier at Manly Wharf, Westfield Miranda, and Westfield Mt Druitt in Sydney). The original Tilt arcades remain in decline; while there were still 30 Tilt locations in 2016, at the end of 2019, just "over 15" remained open. As of April 2026, only 4 legacy Tilt locations remain with more projected to open.

NDI also operates Tilt Studio family entertainment complexes, which include more arcade games along with food service and major attractions & Tilted 10, a bowling entertainment center. Since 2021, more Tilt Studio locations began to open. As of 2026, Tilt Studio has 24 locations with more projected to open.

In June 2026, a Tilt branded location opened at the Frontier Mall in Cheyenne, Wyoming, with some additions from the Tilt Studio concept such as mini-bowling, party rooms, and VR experience.
