= Legoland Discovery Centre =

Indoor family entertainment center chain

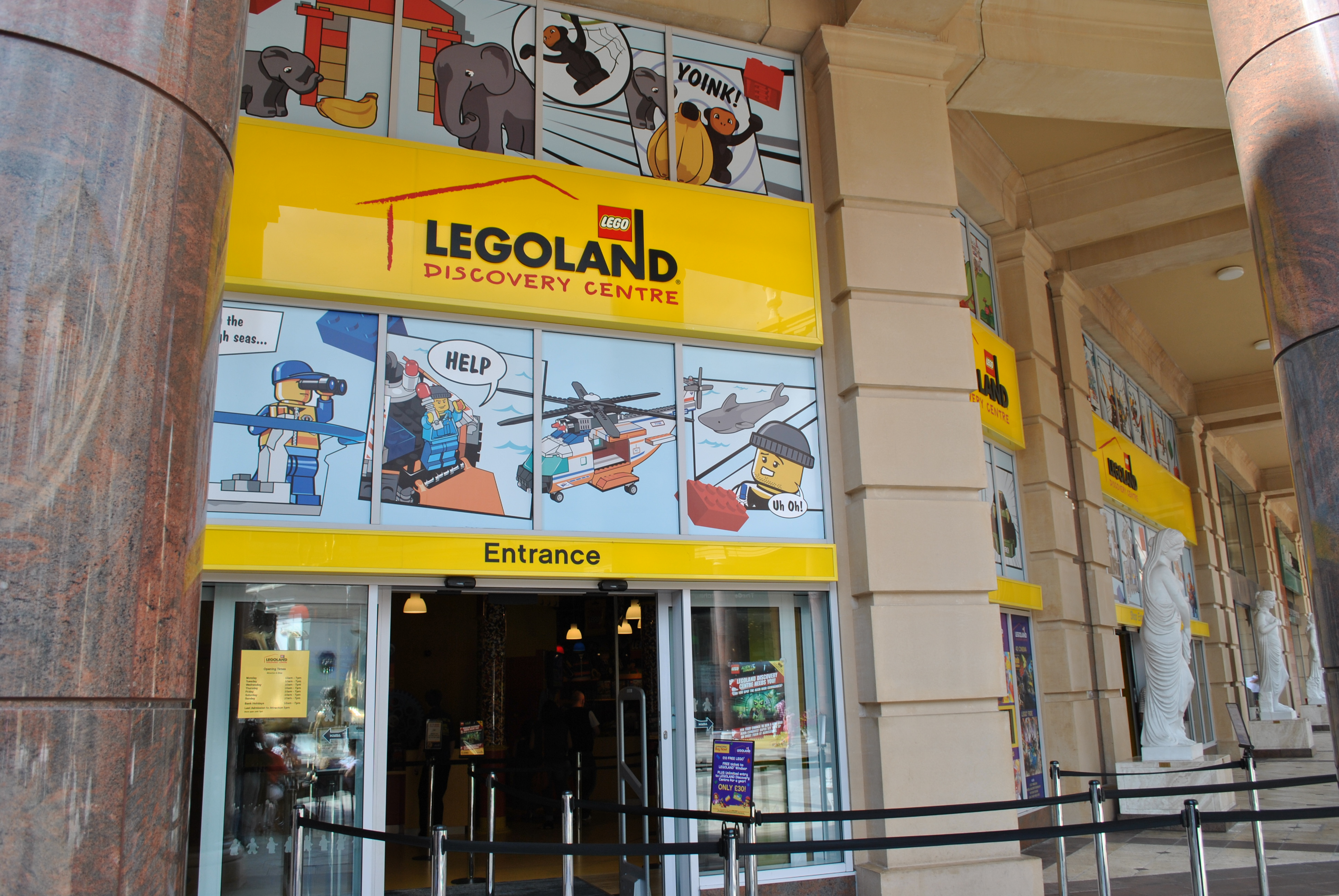
- LEGOLAND Discovery Centre at Trafford Centre
- Number of locations: 29 (by 2023)
- Owner: The Lego Group
- Website: legolanddiscoverycenter.com

Legoland Discovery Centre (Note: Some locations are branded as Lego Discovery Centre. "Legoland" and "Lego" are stylised in all caps at all locations. Those locations in the United States are rendered in American spelling, Legoland Discovery Center or Lego Discovery Center.) is an indoor family attraction chain originally created by British leisure group Merlin Entertainments and currently owned by The Lego Group. Featuring models and attractions inspired by the Lego building toys, the Discovery Centres are smaller and indoor versions of the Legoland theme parks located around the world.

In September 2025, The Lego Group announced that it would take full control of the chain from Merlin, who would continue to operate the Legoland amusement parks under licence. The deal was closed on 27 February 2026, and ownership transitioned over to Lego afterward.

== Attractions ==
A typical Legoland Discovery Centre occupies approximately 30,000–35,000 square feet (2,790–3,250 m^{2}) of floor area.

Discovery Centres include models of local landmarks rendered in Lego bricks. Visitors can also learn how the Lego bricks are manufactured or partake in building classes taught by a Master Model Builder. Certain locations may also include 4-D movie theaters offering multiple showings throughout the day.

A number of children's attractions, such as small rides, play fortresses, and movie theaters are also available. The centres can host birthday parties as well as scholastic and group functions and also include restaurants and gift shops selling Lego merchandise.

== Reception ==
The target audience for the Legoland Discovery Centre is families with young children, normally ages 3 through 12, though a typical location's average guest is about seven years of age. Discovery Centres are located near other family-friendly attractions and dining establishments. In a given year, a single facility can host approximately 400,000 to 600,000 visitors. Adults are not permitted to enter a Legoland Discovery Centre unless accompanied by a child, except at designated adult-only evening events.

== Locations ==
‡ Date of reopening as "LEGO Discovery Centre" or "Center"

=== Asia ===
Name	Image	Status	Opened	Venue	City	State or region etc	Country	Master Model Builder
Beijing		Open		Chaoyang District	Beijing		China	
Hong Kong		Open		K11 Musea	Hong Kong			
Osaka		Open		Tempozan Market Place	Osaka	Kansai	Japan	Kanna Uno
Shanghai		Open		Joy City Changfeng	Shanghai	East China	China	Shenghao Xu
Shenyang		Open		K11 Center	Shenyang	Liaoning	China	
Tokyo		Open		Decks Mall	Tokyo (Odaiba)	Kantō	Japan	Keisuke Sato

=== Europe ===
Name	Image	Status	Opened	Venue	City	State or region etc	Country	Master Model Builder
Berlin (Note: First Legoland Discovery Centre to open (2007).)		Open	2007	The Center Potsdamer Platz	Berlin	Berlin	Germany	
Birmingham		Open		Utilita Arena Birmingham	Birmingham	West Midlands	United Kingdom	Michelle Thompson
Brussels (Note: Branded as "LEGO Discovery Centre")		Open	June 2022	Docks Bruxsel	Brussels		Belgium	Sieber Bulteel
Duisburg		Closed	2008−2013	Duisburg Inner Harbour	Duisburg	North Rhine-Westphalia	Germany	
Hamburg		Open	June 13, 2025	Hamburg Hafen City	Hamburg	Hamburg	Germany	
Istanbul		Closed	2015-2025	Forum Istanbul	Istanbul (Bayrampaşa)	Marmara	Turkey	Deniz Can Doğan
Manchester		Open		Trafford Palazzo	Greater Manchester	North West England	United Kingdom	
Oberhausen (Note: Relocated from Duisburg.)		Open	2013	Westfield Centro	Oberhausen	North Rhine-Westphalia	Germany	
Scheveningen		Open		Scheveningen Boulevard	Scheveningen	South Holland	Netherlands	

=== North America ===
Name	Image	Status	Opened	Venue	City	State or region etc	Country	Master Model Builder
Arizona		Open	April 22, 2016	Arizona Mills	Tempe	Arizona	United States	Alecsander Posta
Atlanta (Note: Branded as "LEGO Discovery Center")		Open	2010 (‡ March 31, 2023)	Phipps Plaza	Atlanta (Buckhead)	Georgia	United States	Elizabeth Baker
Bay Area		Open	(Note: Scheduled opening in 2020, delayed by COVID-19 pandemic.)	Great Mall of the Bay Area	Milpitas	California	United States	Sam Suksiri
Boston (Note: Branded as "LEGO Discovery Center")		Open	May 23, 2014 (‡ May 25, 2023)	Assembly Square	Somerville	Massachusetts	United States	
Chicago		Open		The Streets of Woodfield	Schaumburg	Illinois	United States	Greg Nuse
Columbus		Open		Easton Town Center	Columbus	Ohio	United States	
Dallas/Fort Worth		Open		Grapevine Mills	Grapevine	Texas	United States	
Kansas City		Open	April 2012	Crown Center	Kansas City	Missouri	United States	Brandon Malcom
Michigan		Open	2016	Great Lakes Crossing Outlets	Auburn Hills	Michigan	United States	Clint Parry
New Jersey		Open	May 29, 2021	American Dream Meadowlands	East Rutherford	New Jersey	United States	
Philadelphia		Open	April 2017	Plymouth Meeting Mall	Plymouth Meeting	Pennsylvania	United States	
San Antonio		Open		Shops at Rivercenter	San Antonio	Texas	United States	
Toronto		Open		Vaughan Mills	Vaughan	Ontario	Canada	Noel Straatsma
Washington, D.C. (Note: Branded as "LEGO Discovery Center")		Open	August 10, 2023	Springfield Town Center	Springfield	Virginia	United States	Andrew Litterst
Westchester		Open	March 26, 2013	Westchester's Ridge Hill	Yonkers	New York	United States	Matthew Graham

=== Australia ===
Name	Image	Status	Opened	Venue	City	State or region etc	Country	Master Model Builder
Hotham		Closed	July to October 2018	Hotham Alpine Resort	Mount Hotham	Victoria	Australia	
Melbourne		Open		Chadstone Shopping Centre	Melbourne	Victoria	Australia	Miller Keys

== Future locations ==
- Germany
  - HafenCity, Hamburg, was scheduled to open in Autumn of 2023, before being delayed to Spring 2024.
- United States
  - American Dream Miami, Miami, was scheduled to open in 2023, before being delayed to 2026.
