= The Streets of Woodfield =

Shopping center in Schaumburg, Illinois, US

Coordinates: 42°2′25.5″N 88°2′3″W

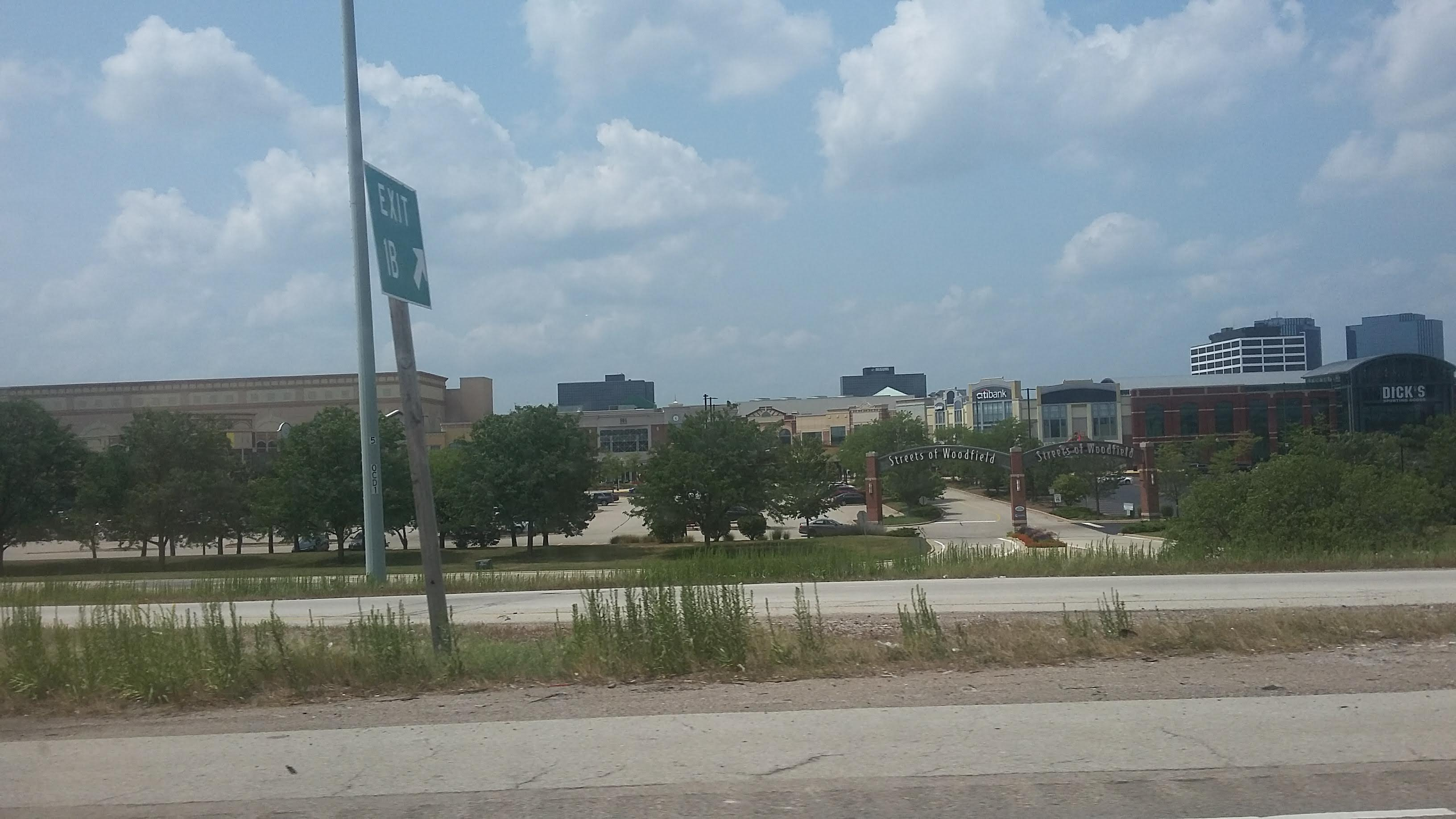
- Location: Schaumburg, Illinois
- Address: 601 North Martingale Road
- Opened: 1991 (as One Schaumburg Place); 2000 (Streets of Woodfield)
- Closed: 1997 (as One Schaumburg Place)
- Developer: Tucker Company
- Owner: Blackstone Group
- Num. of stores: 20
- Num. of anchor tenants: 5 (3 anchors, 2 outparcels)
- Floor area: 589,020 square feet (54,722 m^{2})
- Floors: 1 (2 in Restoration Hardware Outlet & Gameworks, and Dick's Sporting Goods) (3rd floor is a mechanical room)
- Public transit: Pace
- Website: www.shopthestreetsofwoodfield.com

The Streets of Woodfield is a lifestyle center located at I-290 and Higgins Road in Schaumburg, Illinois, directly across from Woodfield Mall. McCaffery Interests, a Chicago-based real estate developer, rebuilt the mall into the present-day configuration as a shopping and entertainment mall anchored by Legoland Discovery Center, Restoration Hardware Outlet, and Dick's Sporting Goods. This lifestyle center also features outparcels across the street like Crate & Barrel and Whole Foods Market. There is also a 20-screen AMC Loews Streets of Woodfield 20. Streets of Woodfield is known throughout the area as a prominent shopping destination.

== History ==
Previously, The Streets of Woodfield was an enclosed, discount-oriented shopping mall known as One Schaumburg Place. One Schaumburg Place opened in 1991 under the development of Ken Tucker, anchored by a Loews Cineplex, Montgomery Ward, Office Depot, Filene's Basement, Phar-Mor, Child World, and Highland Superstore, which later became Chernin Shoes. The mall was largely vacant throughout most of its history, particularly after Montgomery Ward closed in 1997.

McCaffery Interests purchased One Schaumburg Place in 1997 and began reconfiguring the development from a two-level indoor mall into a streetside retail development. This major overhaul concluded in 2000. Original plans called for The Home Depot's Expo Design Center to take over as the south anchor. In 2006, The Home Depot decided to close all of their Expo Design Centers by 2007.

In 1997, Maggiano's Little Italy and Corner Bakery Cafe opened in the surrounding area.

On October 9, 1998, Galyan's opened as the first location the Chicago area. The store was renamed Dick's Sporting Goods in 2004. Carson's officially opened to the public in 2000.

The shopping mall sold to Blackstone Group in February 2015.

On February 1, 2018, The Bon-Ton, announced it would close 42 locations as part of their Chapter 11 Bankruptcy, including the Carson's at the Streets of Woodfield. The store permanently closed in April 2018. This was the second anchor vacancy the lifestyle center has ever faced (as the Streets of Woodfield). Just a year later, a Restoration Hardware Outlet store opened in the former Carson's space.

In December 2021, it was announced that GameWorks would cease operations after struggling financially due to the COVID-19 pandemic.

On February 26, 2024, Dave & Busters opened inside the former GameWorks space.

== Tenants ==
Major retailers of The Streets of Woodfield include Dick's Sporting Goods, LOFT, Jos. A. Bank, Christopher & Banks, Gentlemen's Quarters, Destination Maternity, The Olive Oil Place, Omaha Steaks, Crate & Barrel, The Joffrey Institute and Citibank.

The Streets of Woodfield is also a regional entertainment destination with such features as Color Me Mine, Selfie WRLD, Laugh Out Loud Comedy Club, Chicago Comedy Company and Legoland Discovery Center. The AMC Loews Streets of Woodfield 20 megaplex was renamed when AMC Theatres acquired the Loews Cineplex chain and replaced the early-1990s One Schaumburg Place cinemas with this 20-screen movie theater in 2000. In addition, a 30,000-square-foot (2,800 m^{2}) indoor Legoland Discovery Center, the first one in the United States, opened in late July 2008.

Restaurants and dining in the shopping center include Maggiano's Little Italy, Big Bowl, Shaw's Crab House, Corner Bakery Cafe, Jamba Juice, Starbucks, Jersey Mike's Subs, Tokio Pub, and Whole Foods Market.

Joseph Freed and Associates LLC purchased the mall in 2004. Whole Foods Market and Crate & Barrel were added as outparcels in 2010, the latter relocating from Woodfield Mall. Cypress Equities Real Estate Investment Management acquired the property in 2012.
