= Ridge Hill Mall =

Ridge Hill
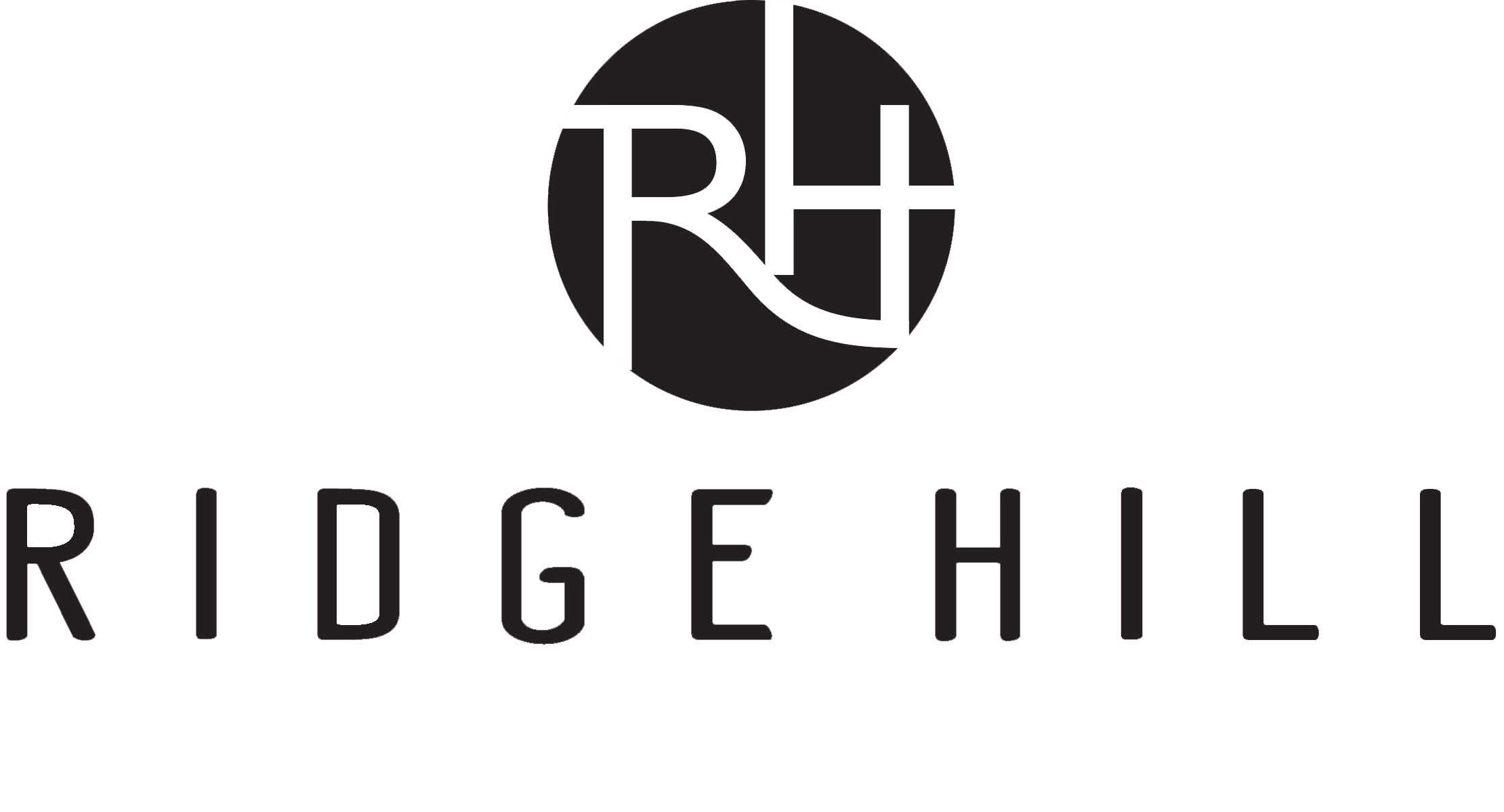
- Location: Yonkers, New York
- Coordinates: 40°57′49″N 73°51′22″W
- Address: 1 Ridge Hill Boulevard
- Opened: October 20, 2011
- Developer: Forest City Enterprises
- Manager: QIC Global Real Estate
- Owner: Queensland Investment Corporation
- Num. of stores: 50
- Num. of anchor tenants: 6
- Floor area: 1.3 million sq ft (120,000 m^{2})
- Floors: 2 with partial 3rd floor and basement
- Parking: 4,700 spaces (5 parking garages, 1 outdoor lot, and valet service)
- Website: www.ridgehill.com

Ridge Hill, formerly known as Westchester's Ridge Hill is a mixed-use lifestyle center located between Interstate 87 and the Sprain Brook Parkway in Yonkers, New York. With its grand opening in 2011, Ridge Hill features a variety of retail stores, restaurants, condominiums, and offices. It was developed by Forest City Ratner Companies, Forest City's New York subsidiary. The center was built on an 84-acre parcel of land purchased from the City of Yonkers. Forest City later sold its mall business to Queensland Investment Corporation.

== History ==
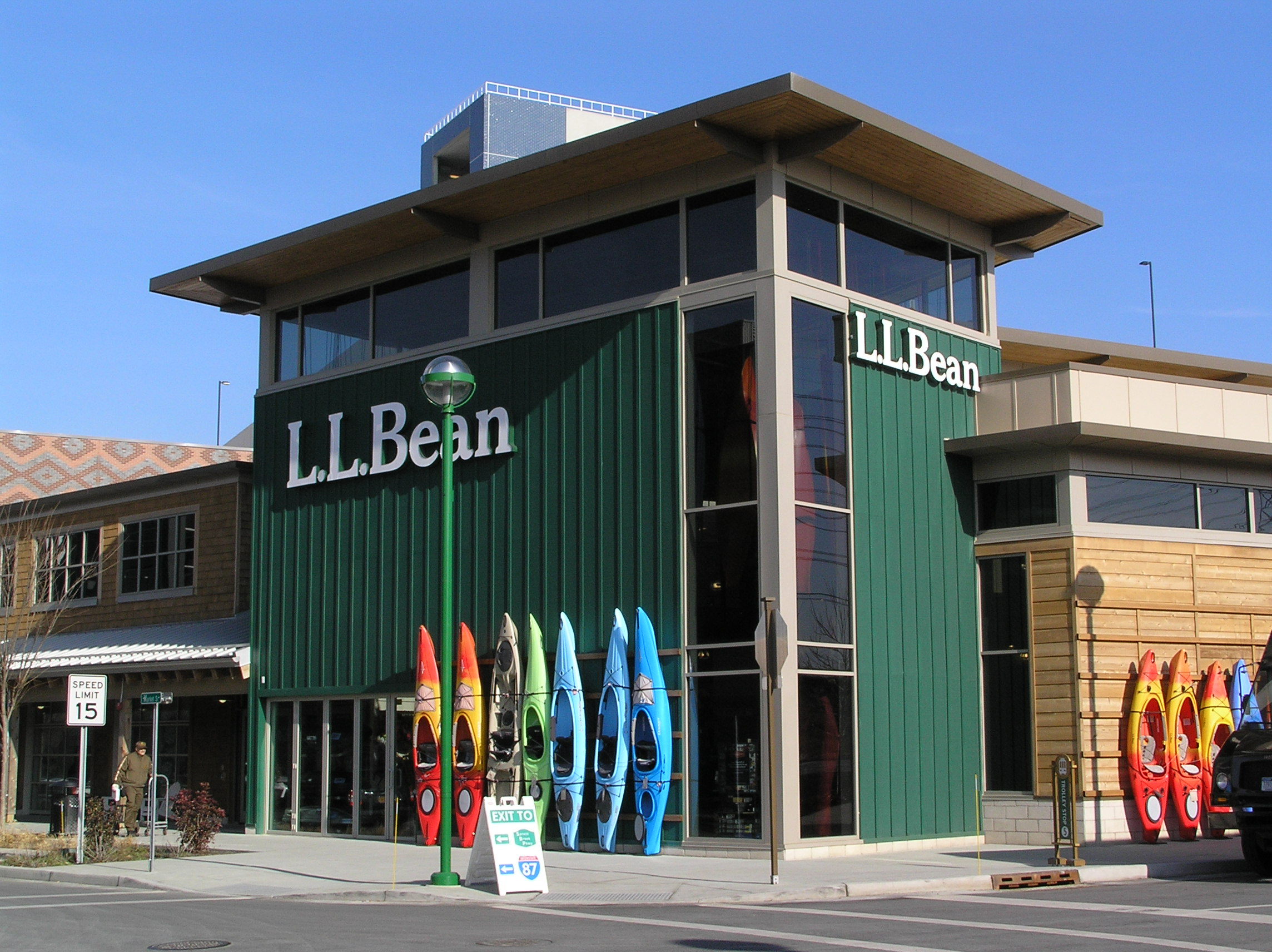
L.L.Bean

The Yonkers Industrial Development Agency began planning the center in 2000 to develop a site and stimulate job growth. Prior to any development, the land was occupied by a sanitarium, hospital, church, and rehab center. After later granting a lease to Lockheed Martin, and when the lack of jobs continued, the lease was terminated by purchasing the remainder of the contract. The City of Yonkers began taking bids from developers, and Ridge Hill won the contract. Original tenants announced included Whole Foods Market and L.L.Bean. Saks Fifth Avenue also showed an interest in adding a location in Yonkers.

In early 2007, the land was cleared to make way for Ridge Hill's construction. Construction formally broke ground on November 8, 2007, with an original projected completion date in 2009. However, in late 2009, Forest City stated that due to the economic recession, the anticipated completion would be pushed back until 2011.

On November 18, 2010, it was announced that multiple stores would open at the mall, including Dick's Sporting Goods, Brio Tuscan Grille, and REI. On December 3, 2010, Lord & Taylor announced they open an 80,000 square feet (7,400 m^{2}) anchor store. That same year, Saks Fifth Avenue stated that it would not add a location at Ridge Hill.

On March 26, 2013, a new $12 million, 32,300 square feet (3,000 m^{2}) Legoland Discovery Center was opened. It was the first Legoland in the Northeast and fifth in the country.

On November 19, 2014, it was announced that eight stores would open, including Starbucks and The Container Store.

On August 27, 2020, the Lord & Taylor anchor store's closure was announced. The entire company went out of business as a result of the COVID-19 pandemic.

On May 6, 2022, it was announced that Ridge Hill had been acquired in a joint venture between Nuveen Real Estate, Taconic Partners, and North American Properties for $220 Million. The plan is to update the complex's appearance and attract other luxury and fitness retailers as well as dining and entertainment options.

== Anchors ==
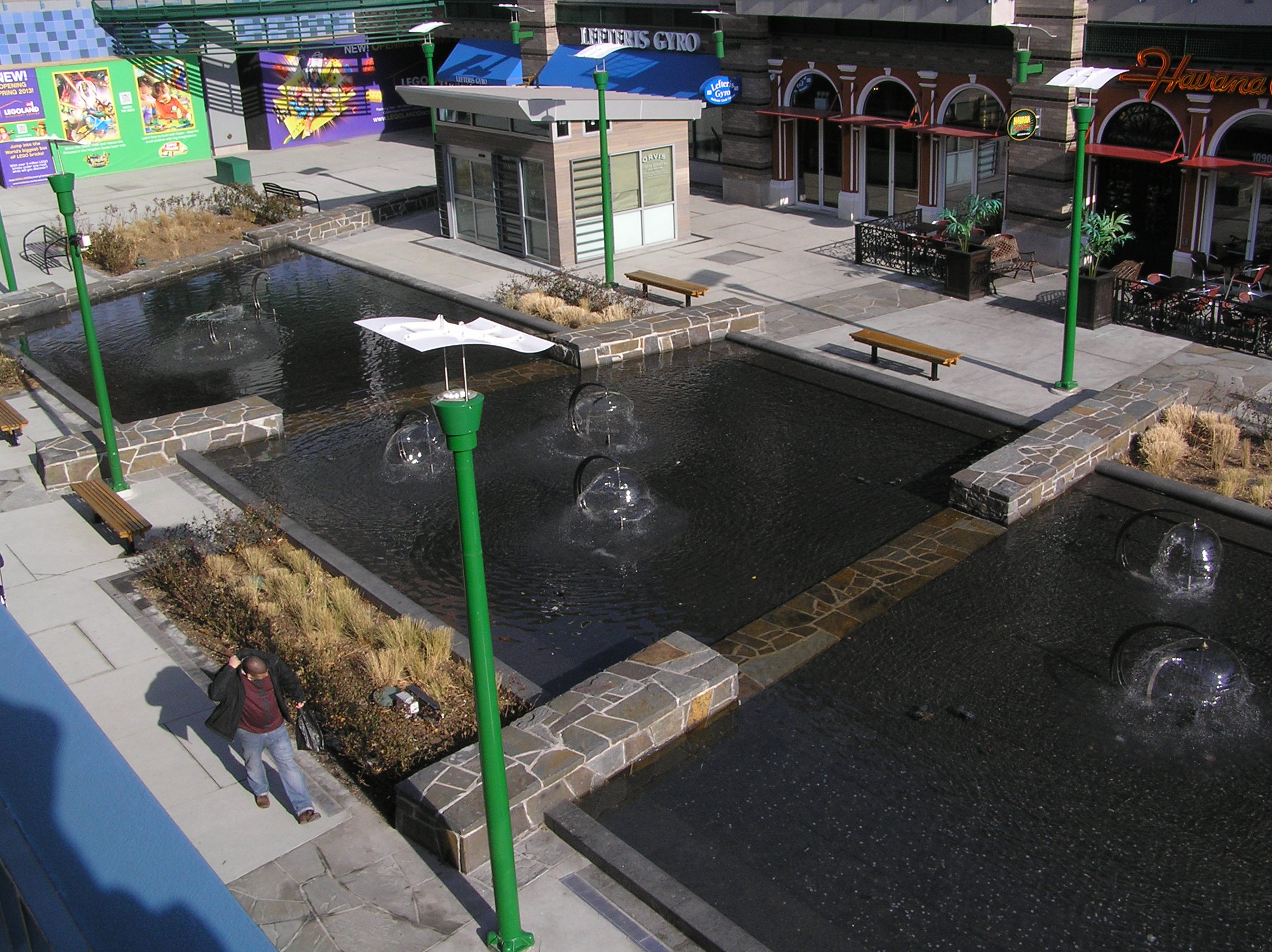
The fountains near the cinema.

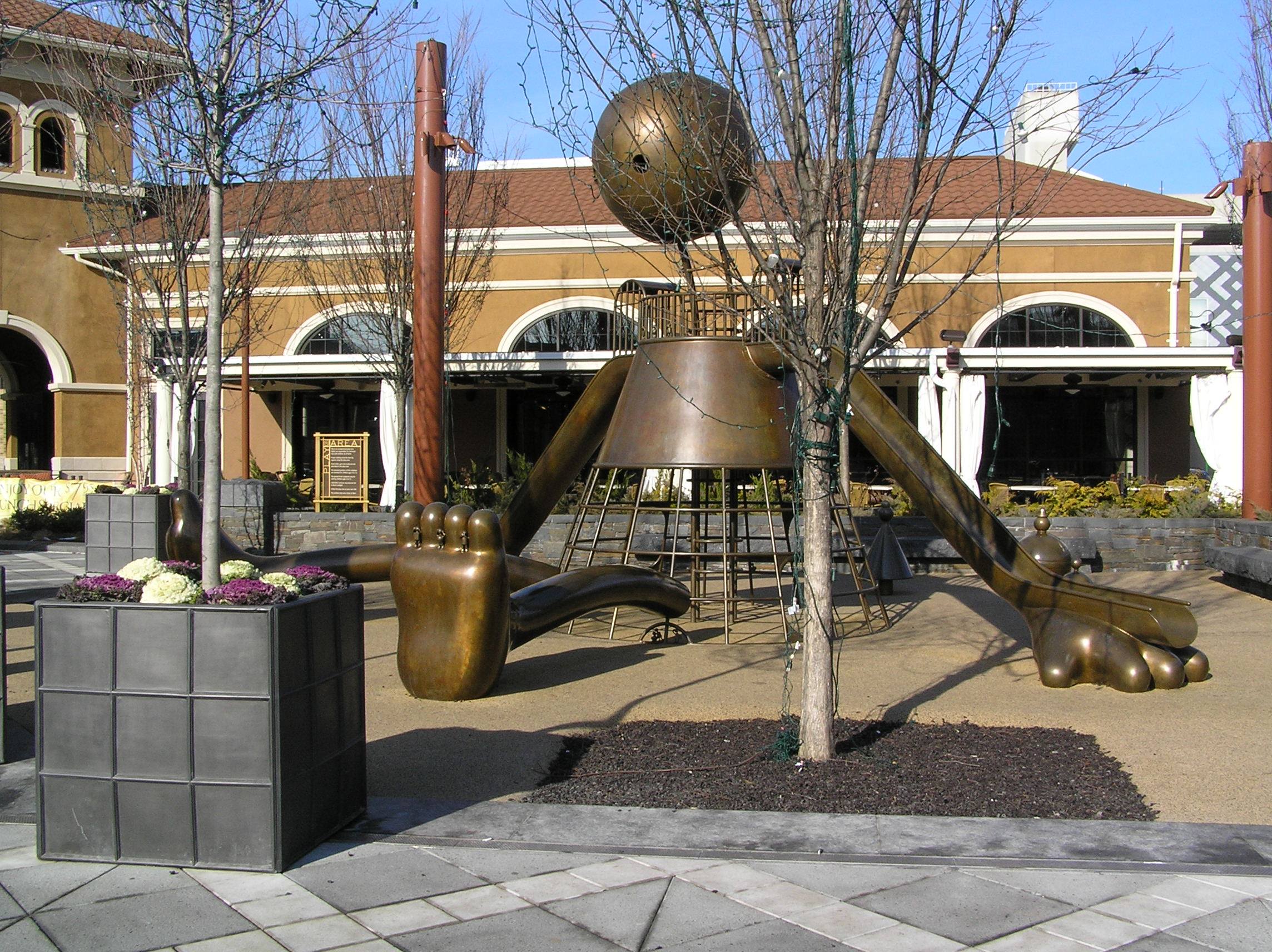
Playground designed by Tom Otterness.

Anchors include:

- Whole Foods Market
- Dick's Sporting Goods
- Lowe's
- TJ Maxx
- Showcase Cinemas
- Legoland Discovery Centre
