= List of Simon Property Group properties =

This is a list of properties owned by Simon Property Group, an American property management corporation.

== Austria ==
- Parndorf Designer Outlet

== Canada ==
- Premium Outlet Collection EIA
- Premium Outlets Montreal
- Toronto Premium Outlets
- Vancouver Designer Outlet

== China ==
- CityOn Xi'an Shopping Center
- CityOn Zhengzhou Shopping Center

== France ==
- Paris-Giverny Designer Outlet
- Provence Designer Outlet

== Germany ==
- Ochtrup Designer Outlet

== Indonesia ==
Managed and owned by Genting Simon Sdn Bhd, a joint venture between Genting Group and Simon Properties.

- Jakarta Premium Outlets - Tangerang

== Italy ==
- La Reggia Designer Outlet
- Noventa di Piave Designer Outlet
- The Mall Firenze
- The Mall Sanremo

== Japan ==
Managed and owned by Mitsubishi Estate Simon, a joint venture between Mitsubishi Estate and Simon Property Group.

- Ami Premium Outlets
- Fukaya-Hanazono Premium Outlets
- Gotemba Premium Outlets
- Kobe-Sanda Premium Outlets
- Rinku Premium Outlets
- Sano Premium Outlets
- Sendai-Izumi Premium Outlets
- Shisui Premium Outlets
- Toki Premium Outlets
- Tosu Premium Outlets

== South Korea ==
A joint venture between Shinsaegae, A Korean department store company and Simon Properties. There are 4 Simon premium outlets in ROK with the first and main outlet in Yeoju.

- Busan Premium Outlets
- Jeju Premium Center
- Paju Premium Outlets
- Siheung Premium Outlets
- Starfield Anseong
- Starfield Hanam
- Yeoju Premium Outlets

== Malaysia ==
Managed and owned by Genting Simon Sdn Bhd, a joint venture between Genting Group and Simon Properties.

- Genting Highlands Premium Outlets
- Johor Premium Outlets

== Mexico ==
- Premium Outlets Punta Norte
- Premium Outlets Querétaro

== Netherlands ==
- Roermond Designer Outlet
- Roosendaal Designer Outlet

== Spain ==
- Málaga Designer Outlet

== Thailand ==
- Siam Premium Outlets Bangkok

== United Kingdom ==
- Ashford Designer Outlet
- Designer Outlet West Midlands

== United States ==
=== Alaska ===
- Anchorage 5th Avenue Mall

=== Arizona ===
- Arizona Mills
- Phoenix Premium Outlets
- Tucson Premium Outlets

=== Arkansas ===
- McCain Mall

=== California ===
- Beverly Center
- Brea Mall
- Camarillo Premium Outlets
- Carlsbad Premium Outlets
- Del Amo Fashion Center
- Desert Hills Premium Outlets
- Fashion Valley Mall
- Folsom Premium Outlets
- Gilroy Premium Outlets
- Great Mall of the Bay Area
- The Gardens on El Paseo
- Las Americas Premium Outlets
- Napa Premium Outlets
- Ontario Mills
- The Outlets at Orange
- Petaluma Village Premium Outlets
- Pismo Beach Premium Outlets
- San Francisco Premium Outlets
- Santa Rosa Plaza
- The Shops at Mission Viejo
- Stanford Shopping Center
- Stoneridge Shopping Center
- Vacaville Premium Outlets

=== Colorado ===
- Cherry Creek Shopping Center
- Colorado Mills
- Denver Premium Outlets
- Denver West Village

=== Connecticut ===
- Clinton Premium Outlets
- Westfarms

=== Delaware ===
- Dover Mall
- Dover Commons

=== Florida ===
- AC Hotel Fort Lauderdale Sawgrass Mills/Sunrise
- AC Hotel Miami Dadeland
- Aventura Mall
- The Avenues
- Brickell City Centre
- Coconut Point
- The Colonnade Outlets at Sawgrass Mills
- Coral Square
- Cordova Mall
- Dadeland Mall
- Dolphin Mall
- Ellenton Premium Outlets
- The Falls
- Florida Keys Outlet Marketplace
- The Florida Mall
- International Plaza and Bay Street
- Miami International Mall
- Miami Worldcenter
- The Mall at Millenia (split)
- The Mall at University Town Center
- Orlando International Premium Outlets
- The Oasis at Sawgrass Mills
- Orlando Outlet Marketplace
- Orlando Vineland Premium Outlets
- Pier Park
- Sawgrass Mills
- Silver Sands Premium Outlets
- St. Augustine Premium Outlets
- St. Johns Town Center
- St. Johns Town Center (Community Center)
- Tampa Premium Outlets
- Town Center at Boca Raton
- Treasure Coast Square
- Tyrone Square Mall
- Waterside Shops (split)

=== Georgia ===
- AC Hotel Atlanta Buckhead at Phipps Plaza
- Calhoun Outlet Marketplace
- Lenox Square
- Mall of Georgia
- Nobu Hotel Atlanta
- North Georgia Premium Outlets
- One Phipps Plaza
- Phipps Plaza
- Sugarloaf Mills

=== Hawaii ===
- International Market Place
- Waikele Premium Outlets

=== Illinois ===
- Chicago Premium Outlets
- Gurnee Mills
- Orland Square Mall
- White Oaks Mall
- Woodfield Mall

=== Indiana ===
- Castleton Square
- College Mall
- The Fashion Mall at Keystone
- Greenwood Park Mall
- Hamilton Town Center
- Indiana Premium Outlets
- Lighthouse Place Premium Outlets
- The Offices at Circle Centre
- Tippecanoe Mall
- University Park Mall

=== Kansas ===
- Towne East Square

=== Louisiana ===
- Prien Lake Mall

=== Maine ===
- Kittery Premium Outlets

=== Maryland ===
- Arundel Mills
- Arundel Mills Marketplace
- Clarksburg Premium Outlets
- Queenstown Premium Outlets
- St. Charles Towne Center

=== Massachusetts ===
- Auburn Mall
- Burlington Mall
- Cape Cod Mall
- Copley Place
- Lee Premium Outlets
- Liberty Tree Mall
- Liberty Tree Strip
- Northshore Mall
- The Offices at Copley Place
- Reliant Medical Group - Auburn Office
- The Shops at Chestnut Hill
- South Shore Plaza
- Square One Mall
- Wrentham Village Premium Outlets

=== Michigan ===
- Birch Run Premium Outlets
- Briarwood Mall
- Great Lakes Crossing Outlets
- Twelve Oaks Mall

=== Minnesota ===
- Albertville Premium Outlets
- Homewood Suites by Hilton Edina Minneapolis
- Miller Hill Mall
- Southdale Center
- Twin Cities Premium Outlets

=== Mississippi ===
- Gulfport Premium Outlets

=== Missouri ===
- Battlefield Mall
- St. Louis Premium Outlets

=== Nevada ===
- The Forum Shops at Caesars
- Las Vegas Premium Outlets North
- Las Vegas Premium Outlets South
- Meadowood Mall
- The Shops at Crystals

=== New Hampshire ===
- The Mall at Rockingham Park
- The Mall of New Hampshire
- Merrimack Premium Outlets
- Pheasant Lane Mall

=== New Jersey ===
- Gloucester Premium Outlets
- Jackson Premium Outlets
- Jersey Shore Premium Outlets
- Menlo Park Mall
- Menlo Park Office Building
- The Mills at Jersey Gardens
- The Mall at Short Hills
- Newport Centre
- Newport Crossing
- Newport Plaza
- Ocean County Mall
- Quaker Bridge Mall
- Rockaway Townsquare
- The Shops at Riverside

=== New Mexico ===
- ABQ Uptown

=== New York ===
- Residence Inn Long Island Garden City
- Roosevelt Field
- Smith Haven Mall
- The Westchester
- Walt Whitman Shops
- Waterloo Premium Outlets
- Woodbury Common Premium Outlets

=== North Carolina ===
- Carolina Premium Outlets
- Charlotte Premium Outlets
- Concord Mills
- Phillips Place
- SouthPark
- The Village at SouthPark

=== Ohio ===
- Aurora Farms Premium Outlets
- Cincinnati Premium Outlets
- Summit Mall

=== Oklahoma ===
- Penn Square Mall
- Woodland Hills Mall
- Tulsa Premium Outlets

=== Oregon ===
- Woodburn Premium Outlets

=== Pennsylvania ===
- Grove City Premium Outlets
- King of Prussia Mall
- Lehigh Valley Mall
- Oxford Valley Mall
- Philadelphia Premium Outlets
- Pocono Premium Outlets
- Ross Park Mall
- South Hills Village

=== Puerto Rico ===
- The Mall of San Juan
- Plaza Carolina
- Puerto Rico Premium Outlets

=== South Carolina ===
- Gaffney Outlet Marketplace
- Haywood Mall

=== South Dakota ===
- Empire Mall

=== Tennessee ===
- The Mall at Green Hills
- Nashville Premium Outlets (opening date TBA)
- Opry Mills
- Sagefield (opening date TBA)
- West Town Mall
- Wolfchase Galleria

=== Texas ===
- Allen Premium Outlets
- Barton Creek Square
- Broadway Square Mall
- Cielo Vista Mall
- The Domain
- Firewheel Town Center
- The Galleria
- Grand Prairie Premium Outlets
- Grapevine Mills
- Houston Premium Outlets
- Katy Mills
- La Plaza Mall
- Lakeline Mall
- Midland Park Mall
- North East Mall
- The Offices at Clearfork
- The Offices at The Domain
- Offices at Firewheel Town Center
- Parkside at Round Rock
- Rio Grande Valley Premium Outlets
- Round Rock Premium Outlets
- San Marcos Premium Outlets
- The Shops at Clearfork
- University Park Village
- The Westin Austin at The Domain

=== Utah ===
- City Creek Center

=== Virginia ===
- Apple Blossom Mall
- Fashion Centre at Pentagon City
- Leesburg Premium Outlets
- Metro Tower at Pentagon City
- Norfolk Premium Outlets
- Potomac Mills
- Williamsburg Premium Outlets

=== Washington ===
- Columbia Center Mall
- North Bend Premium Outlets
- Northgate Station
- Seattle Premium Outlets
- Tacoma Mall

=== Wisconsin ===
- Bay Park Square
- Johnson Creek Premium Outlets
- Pleasant Prairie Premium Outlets
