= Original Outlet Mall =

Former shopping mall in Kenosha, Wisconsin, United States

- Location: Kenosha, Wisconsin, U.S.
- Coordinates: 42°33′45″N 87°57′16″W
- Address: 12185 77th Street
- Opened: 1982
- Closed: 2006
- Previous names: Factory Outlet Centre
- Developer: Kenneth B. Karl
- Num. of stores: 117
- Floor area: 400,000 square feet (37,000 m^{2})
- Floors: 1

Original Outlet Mall, formerly known as the Factory Outlet Centre, was an indoor outlet mall located in Kenosha, Wisconsin, United States. Opening in 1982, it was the first outlet mall in the state of Wisconsin. Original Outlet Mall faced competition in the 1990s as newer outlet malls opened in nearby cities. The mall was demolished in two phases from 2005 to 2006, with an Ashley HomeStore built on part of the site.

== History ==
The Factory Outlet Centre was developed by Kenneth B. Karl. The Bristol mall was Karl's second outlet center, with construction beginning in June 1982. It was built in Kenosha, Wisconsin, on a site near the intersection of Interstate 94 and Wisconsin Highway 50. The mall opened to the public on October 1, 1982, with 27 stores in 120,000 square feet of space. The Factory Outlet Centre was expanded several times in its early years; by 1990, the mall had 117 stores totaling over 400,000 square feet.

According to the Kenosha News in 1990, most customers at the Factory Outlet Centre came from out of town, particularly the Chicago area, and few Kenosha residents shopped there. The opening of the Lakeside Marketplace outlet mall three miles to the south in 1988 provided competition to the Factory Outlet Centre; although Lakeside Marketplace was smaller, it had more upscale merchandise and was closer to Chicago shoppers. The much larger Gurnee Mills outlet mall, 14 miles south of Bristol, worsened the mall's situation when it opened in 1991.

The mall was sold for $17 million to Clearview Investments Ltd of Arlington, Texas in January 1998, who immediately announced plans to remodel the mall in order to attract new tenants. Clearview rebranded the property as The Original Outlet Mall later that year. The mall was sold again in 2000 to Jaeger & Jaeger of Deerfield, Illinois; at this time, the mall was at 80% occupancy. By 2001, occupancy had improved to 85%, but was still behind newer outlets nearby such as the Johnson Creek Outlet Center and Prime Outlets Pleasant Prairie with 95% occupancy. By late 2003, occupancy had slipped to 61%, and in January 2004 lenders GMAC Commercial Mortgage Corp and LaSalle National Bank moved to sue the owners, claiming the owners had defaulted on a $20 million loan, and demanded the mall be sold at sheriff's auction. The property was handed back to the lenders in February that year, who announced they were looking to sell the mall within the year. The mall was later acquired in December 2004 by American Realty Advisors, in a joint venture with the Tucker Development Corporation. Plans called to continue operating the site as an outlet mall in the near future, but to later redevelop the property into a 300,000 square foot community shopping center.

By January 2006, demolition had commenced on northern portion of the mall, with the small number of remaining tenants condensed into the southern wing of the mall, on short-term leases. By August, demolition of the mall had been finished, with construction of an Ashley HomeStore on the grounds already in progress. Also planned for the site were three 8,000 square foot commercial sites, a 121-room hotel on the site, and four additional lots left for future expansion.
