= Lighthouse Place Premium Outlets =

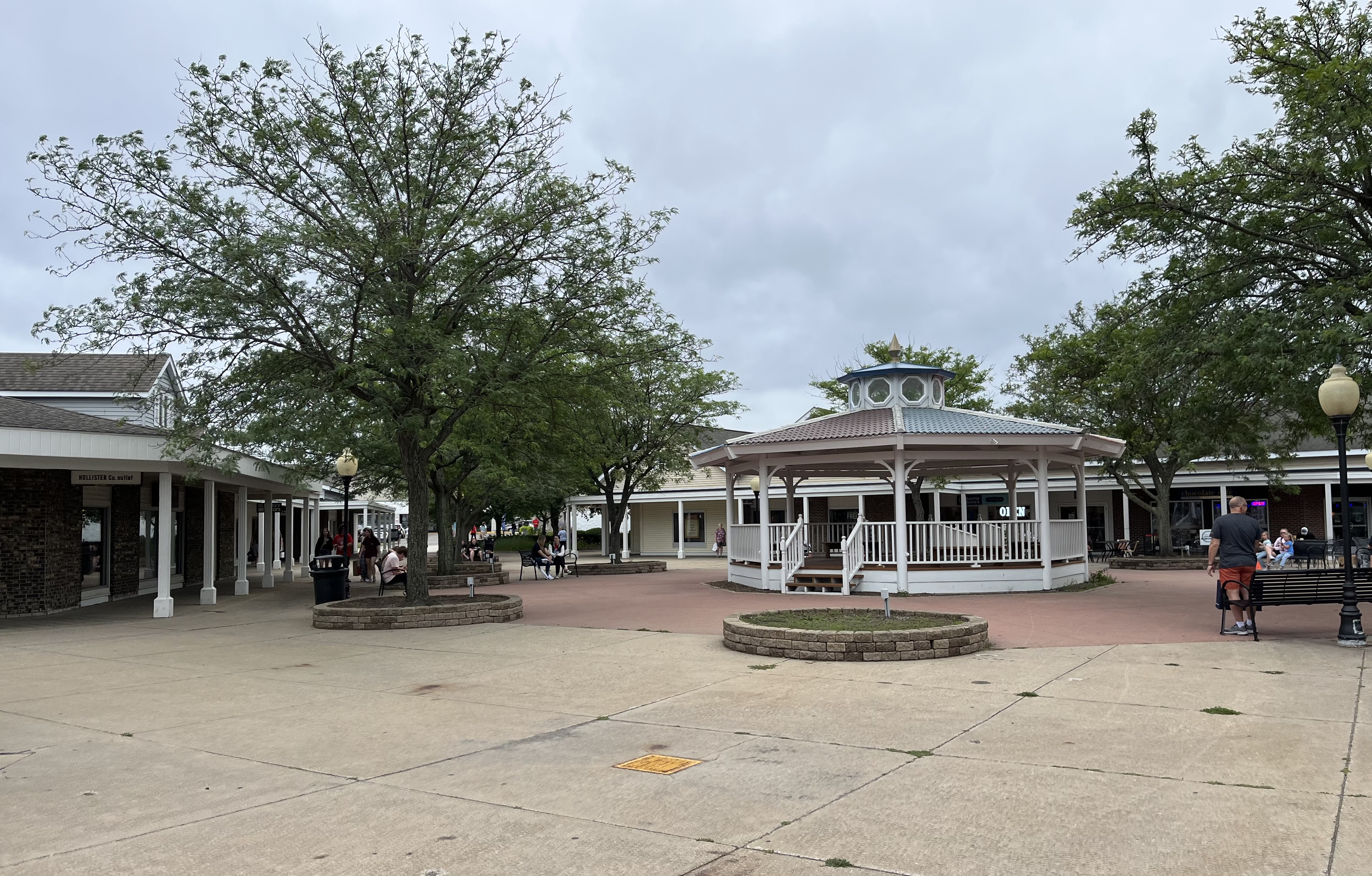
- Location: Michigan City, Indiana
- Coordinates: 41°42′52″N 86°54′23″W
- Address: 601 Wabash Street
- Opened: May 1987
- Manager: Simon's Premium Outlets
- Owner: Simon Property Group
- Num. of stores: 120
- Public transit: Michigan City Transit

Lighthouse Place Premium Outlets is an open-air outlet store shopping mall located in Michigan City, Indiana.

The mall is one of Michigan City's major tourist attractions. It is one of Northwest Indiana's most popular shopping centers, receiving an estimated one million visitors annually as of 2017. The mall is located in Michigan City's downtown area. It is designed to resemble a seaside village, playing off of its proximity to Lake Michigan.

== History ==
The site where the mall is now located was once occupied by a Pullman Company railcar plant.

Construction of the mall started in the autumn of 1986, and the mall's central court opened in May 1987.

Unlike many malls of its era, Lighthouse Place Premium Outlets was constructed in the city's downtown, rather than near highways; and was an open-air mall, as opposed to an indoor mall.

The mall is in walking distance of the South Shore Line's 11th Street station.

== See also ==
- List of Simon Property Group properties
