= Michigan City Transit =

Municipal bus service in Michigan City, Indiana

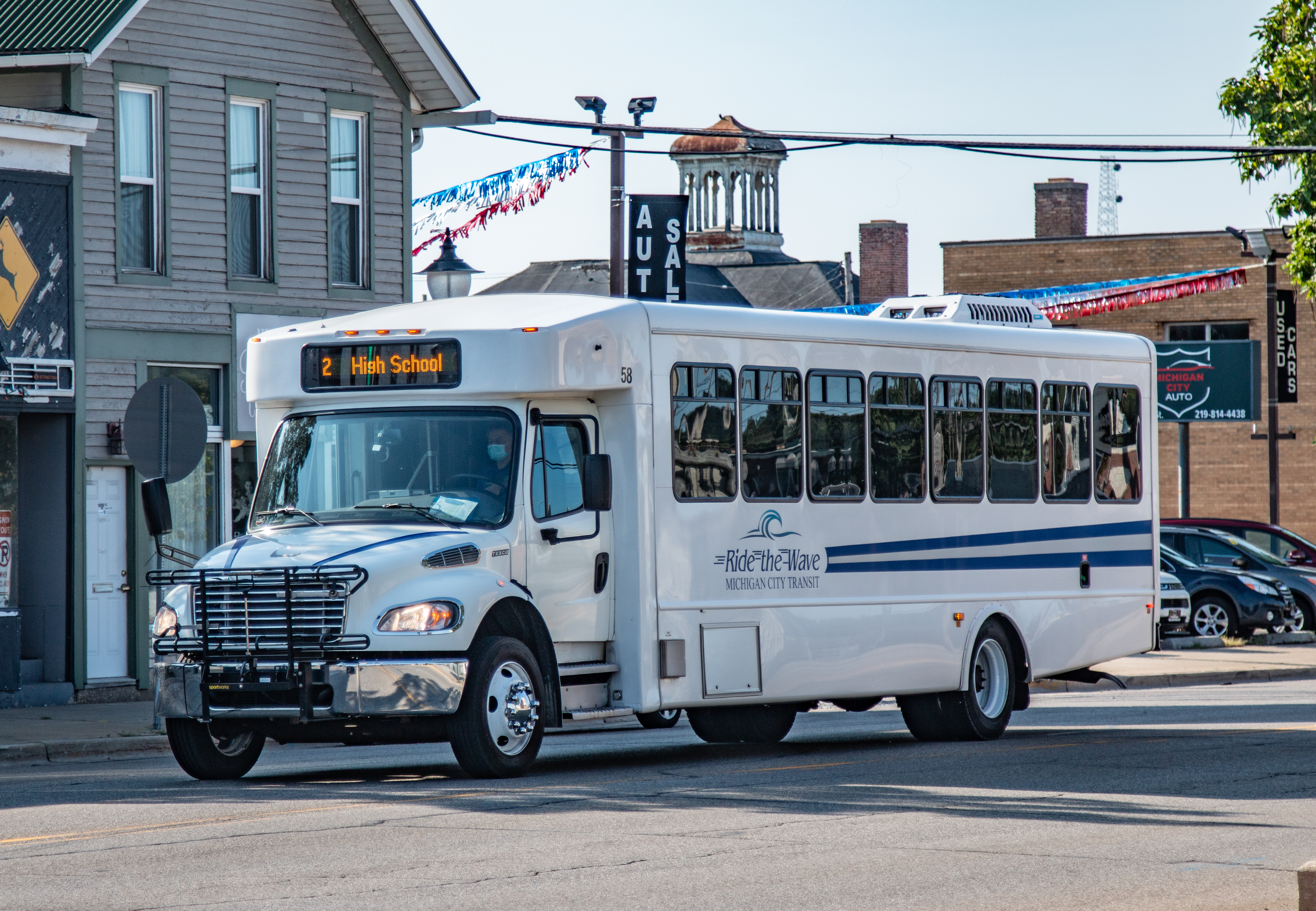
- Michigan City Transit bus in downtown Michigan City, 2021
- Headquarters: 1801 Kentucky Street
- Locale: Michigan City, Indiana, United States
- Service area: urban area
- Service type: bus service, paratransit
- Routes: 4
- Fleet: 9 vehicles
- Annual ridership: 170,367 -6.13%)
- Fuel type: Diesel
- Operator: City of Michigan City
- Chief executive: Cranston Harris, Director
- Website: Michigan City Transit

Michigan City Transit is a municipal bus service in Michigan City, Indiana. It was known as Michigan City Municipal Coach until 2007. The service was created in 1955, when Michigan City assumed control of bus routes operated by Michigan City Transit Lines, a private bus system. Michigan City Transit Lines, in turn, was a successor of Michigan City's streetcar system.

== Current system summary ==
Michigan City Transit operates four fixed bus routes and a dial-a-ride service for seniors and people with disabilities. The system runs at 6:30 AM – 6:30 PM on weekdays and 8:30 AM – 6:30 PM on Saturdays. Between 2007 and October 1, 2010, the system ran between 5:30 AM – 9:00 PM on weekdays and 6:30 AM – 9:00 PM on Saturdays thanks to a federal service grant, but the service hours were cut once that grant ran out.

All fixed routes originate and terminate at the Michigan City Public Library with an hourly headway. Each route runs in a largely counterclockwise loop that only runs in one direction (except for the few parts where two sides of the loop converge on the same street, creating an illusion of bi-directional service).

Michigan City Transit fares are free for all passengers.

== Route list ==
- 1 Sheridan Beach-Lake Hills-Marquette Mall
- 2 Medical Center-Normandy Village-Marquette Mall
- 3 Karwick Rd-Michigan Blvd-Marquette Mall
- 4 Southgate-Westwind

== Transit connections ==
=== Rail transit ===
Michigan City Transit does not offer direct connections to either South Shore Line or Amtrak's Wolverine route, though the routes pass fairly close to their stations. The system schedules are not aligned, so passengers may wait as much as forty minutes in order to transfer. Routes 1, 2, and 4 pass near 11th Street South Shore Line station at 11th/Franklin Street intersection. Route 3 passes near Carroll Avenue station at Carroll Avenue/Holiday Street intersection. Northbound Route 1 buses pass near the city's Amtrak station.

=== Inter-City bus transit ===
Michigan City Transit routes 1, 2 and 4 stop near Clarion Hotel (5820 Franklin St), where riders can transfer to Coach USA's Tri-State/United Limo Service. Passengers can take eastbound buses to South Bend and Notre Dame and westbound buses to Portage, Highland, Crestwood and O'Hare and Midway airports. The service runs seven days a week, with westbound buses running once an hour in both directions and eastbound buses running once every two hours in both directions.

== See also ==
- List of bus transit systems in the United States
- South Shore Line
