= 11th Street station (Indiana) =

South Shore Line station in Indiana

11th Street
- Platforms, station building, and parking garage post-rebuilding in November 2026

General information
- Location: 114 East 11th Street; Michigan City, Indiana
- Coordinates: 41°42′43″N 86°53′49″W
- Owner: NICTD
- Platforms: Two side platforms
- Tracks: 2 (gauntlet tracks)
- Connections: Michigan City Transit

Construction
- Structure type: At-grade
- Parking: Yes
- Accessible: Yes

Other information
- Status: Open
- Fare zone: 8

History
- Opened: May 1927
- Rebuilt: 2021–2023

Passengers
- 2019: 102 (average weekday)

Services
Preceding station	NICTD	Following station
Beverly Shores toward Millennium Station	Lakeshore Corridor	Carroll Avenue toward South Bend International Airport
Former services
Preceding station	NICTD	Following station
Willard Avenue Closed 1994 toward Randolph Street	South Shore Line	Carroll Avenue toward South Bend
Track layout
Location

11th Street (Michigan City) station is a train station in the central city neighborhood of Michigan City, Indiana. It serves the South Shore Line commuter rail line and is one of two active stations in Michigan City, the other being Carroll Avenue station. It is located adjacent to the location of the historic 11th Street station of the former Chicago, South Shore and South Bend Railroad station (now demolished), which operated the station from 1927 until 1987. Prior to the May 2021 closure, the station was composed of a passenger shelter and a sign on the northwest corner of East 11th Street and Pine Street; boarding and alighting was done from the street itself. A more modern station with two tracks and high-level platforms opened in October 2023.

== History ==
=== Before NICTD ===
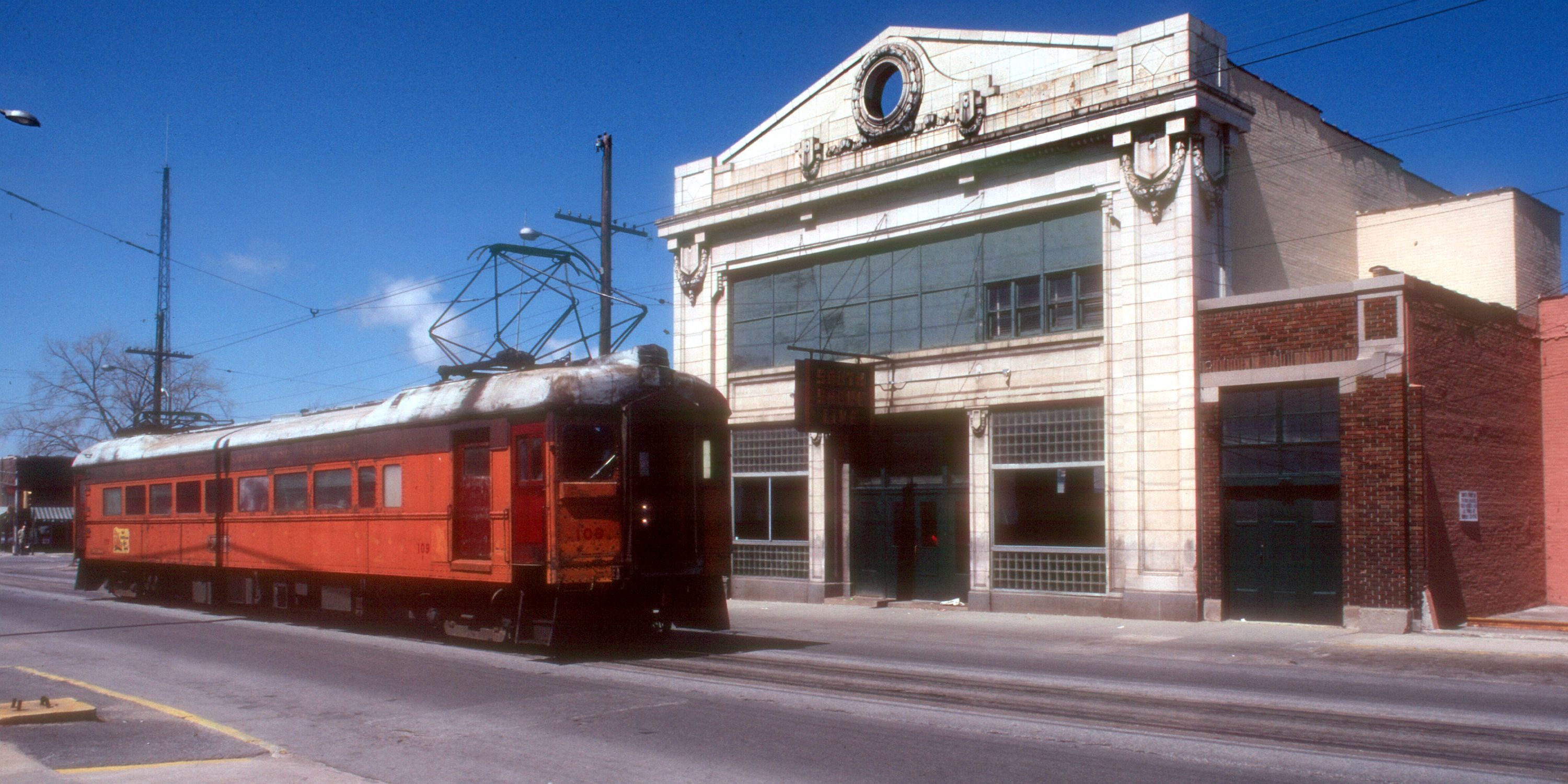
A train at the station in 1981

The Chicago, South Shore and South Bend was one of the last interurban railroads to operate profitably in the United States. Aggressive management, led by financier Samuel Insull, reconceptualized the South Shore as the linchpin of a public transportation network operating throughout the industrialized Indiana Dunes region of Indiana. Insull interests built the 11th Street Station in central Michigan City in May 1927 as a pioneering piece of multimodal public transportation infrastructure. The South Shore had affiliated with several regional bus lines, and the 11th Street Station was conceived as a waiting area point where system users would transfer between a bus and an electric train.

=== Operation under NICTD ===
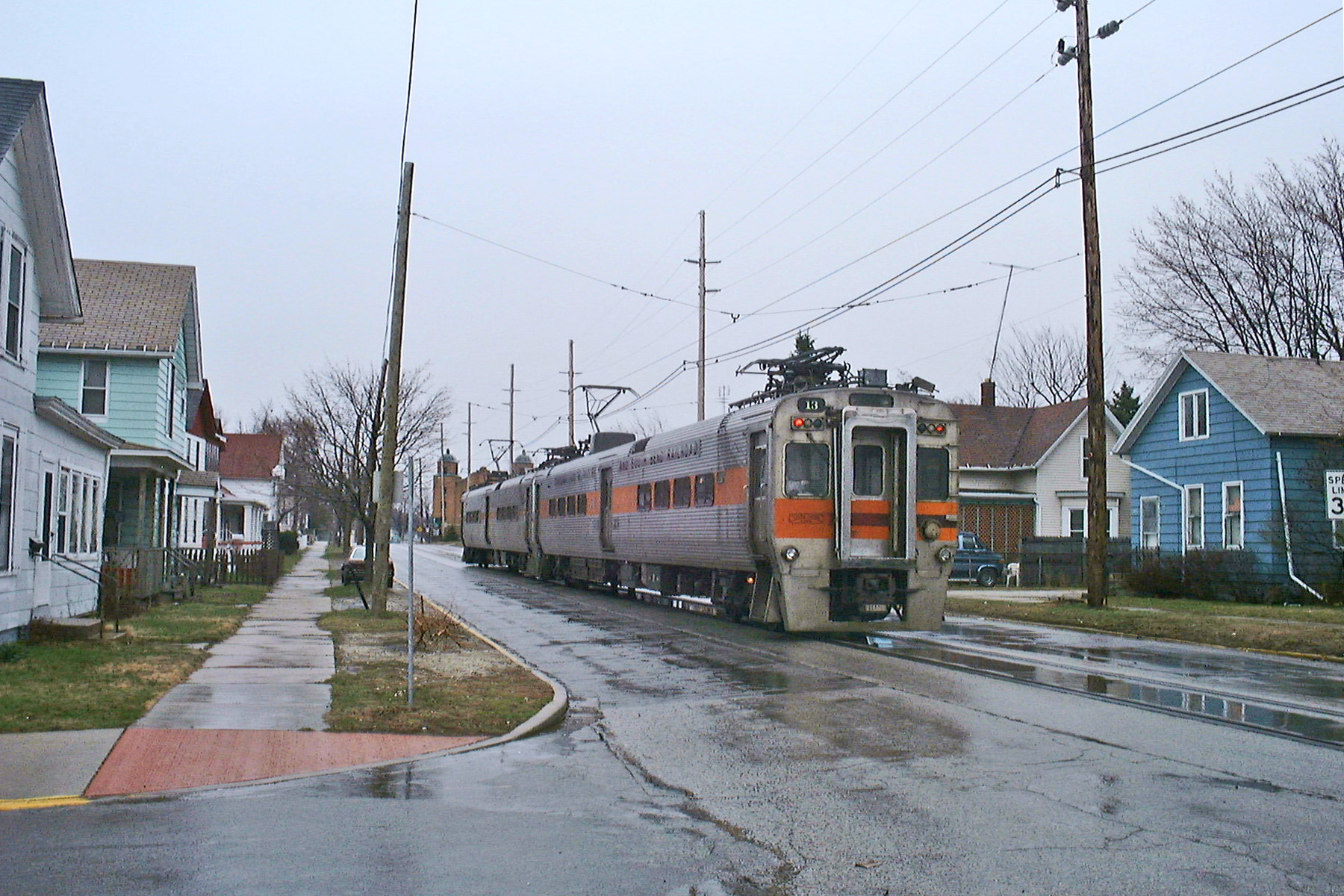
Chicago-bound train approaches former 11th Street station

After operating relatively successfully for some decades, the South Shore entered bankruptcy in the 1980s. Electric train service was reorganized under the umbrella of the publicly funded Northern Indiana Commuter Transportation District (NICTD), but affiliated bus service had long since ceased. The South Shore Line closed the 11th Street station building in November 1987, but its NICTD successor-in-interest maintained train service to the street adjacent to the station. The station building itself, designed by Insull's staff-architect Arthur U. Gerber, was demolished in January 2022.

Until April 30, 2021, the trains continued to stop near the original station, opening the door on the north side of the track. To make up for the closure of the station building, NICTD set up a small passenger shelter at the end of the adjacent parking lot, near the 11th Street/Pine Street intersection. As the rule of thumb, conductors only opened the doors in the first two cars.

The station's street-running location presented some issues, such as difficulties with accessibility to those with physical disability and difficulty of use for those seeking to bring their bicycles on the train. However, its location provided convenient access to the retail, art galleries, and restaurants of the surrounding Uptown neighborhood, as well as walkable access to bus stops for all of the Michigan City Transit routes, Lighthouse Place Premium Outlets, cultural attractions, and the Washington Park beach.

=== Reconstruction ===
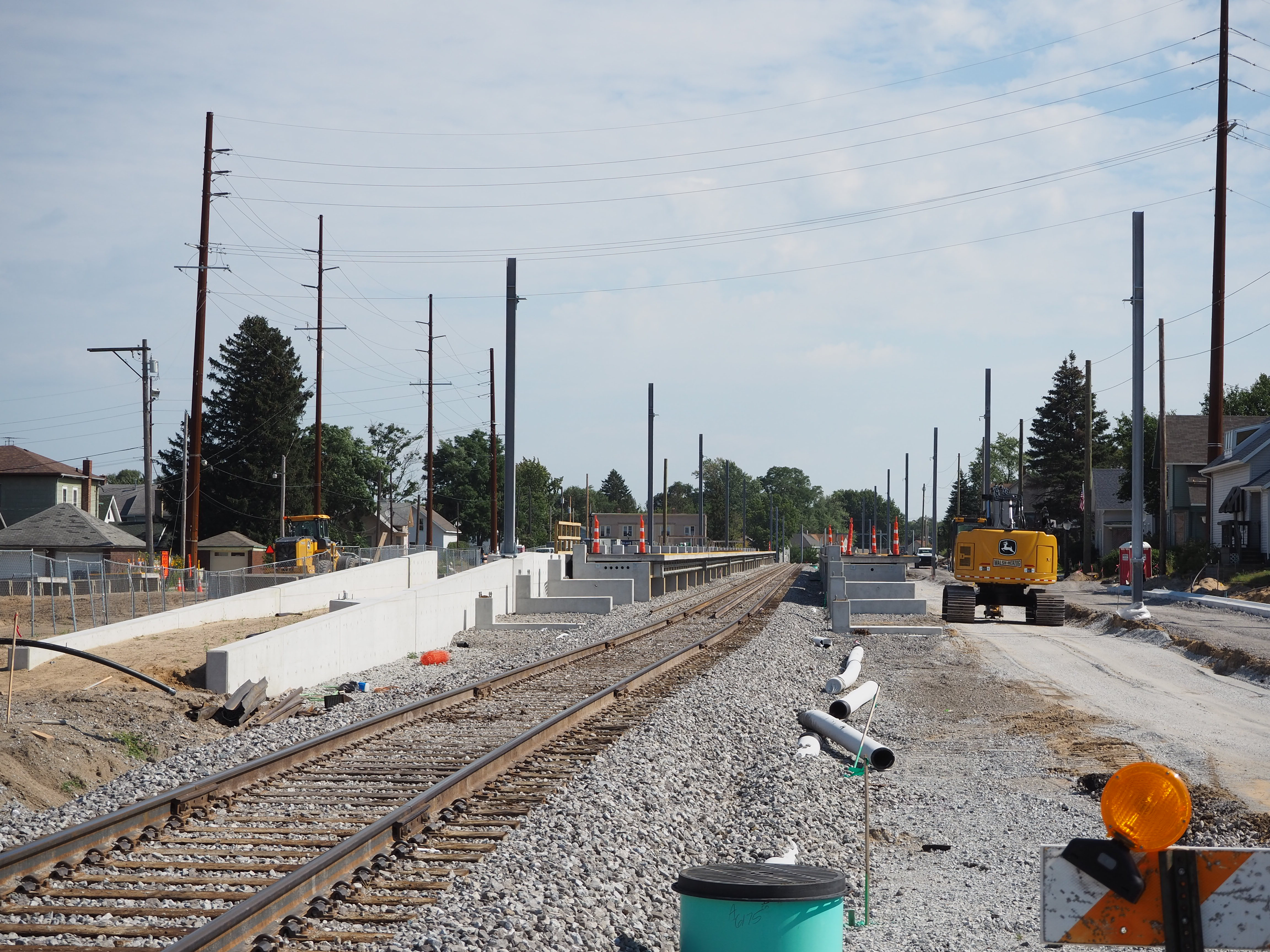
New platforms at 11th Street as of September 2022

Michigan City and NICTD long discussed the possibility of moving the tracks off the street onto a less intrusive alignment. A series of studies concluded that the 11th Street alignment was the most viable and cost-effective option, especially in terms of transit-oriented development. There were considerable concerns among Michigan City residents about this plan, particularly those who would have to be relocated. Other possible alignments existed that would also have separated the NICTD tracks from a grade widely used by motor vehicle traffic, and a public hearing was held in September 2011 to discuss these possible alignments. However, the alignment adjacent to 11th Street was chosen, largely due to the potential for surrounding development, with the plans specifying the conversion of 11th Street into a one-way street with the two tracks running adjacent to the street.

As part of the South Shore Line's double tracking project, the station closed on May 1, 2021, for the two and a half-year duration of the project. The official date of its closure had only been announced less than three weeks earlier on April 14, 2021. During the closure, service continued at Michigan City's Carroll Avenue station, which is connected to the area of the 11th Street Station by the Michigan City Transit Route 3 bus. However, train service between Caroll Avenue and Gary was suspended until the Fall of 2023, with rail replacement bus service being used to connect the train service between South Bend Airport and Carroll Avenue with the train service between Chicago and Dune Park. In October 2023, train service resumed to between Dune Park and Carroll Avenue (including 11th Street) but busing continues between Dune Park and Gary Metro Center, expected to end in May 2024.

The 11th Street station was rebuilt at approximately the same location and includes high-level platforms capable of accommodating eight-car trains. The redeveloped station is also planned to include a multi-story parking garage and attached retail facility.

In September 2021, the city of Michigan City issued a request for proposal (RFP) for developers interested in building a mixed-use development on the 65,300 square foot (6,070 m^{2}) city block of the planned rebuilt station (the block enveloped by Franklin, Pine, 10th, and 11th streets). In doing so, Michigan City and NICTD indicated their interest in seeing developer construct a mixed-use development that would include intermodal hub featuring 426 parking spaces, a passenger waiting area, and a train stop for the South Shore Line, ideally with the original station building's facade being restored and reinstalled. The RFP specified that the project could be as many as ten floors high and needed to be finished by the expected May 2024 completion of the South Shore Line double track construction. The city committed to providing $16 million in funding to aid in their construction. On February 23, 2022, it was announced that Michigan City and NICTD had reached an agreement with Flaherty & Collins Properties for an $80 million mixed-use development. Flaherty & Collins' proposal had been unanimously chosen by a review committee. The development will include, in addition to the new train station, a twelve-story high-rise with 208 luxury residential apartments, more than 10,000 square feet (930 m^{2}) of commercial space, and a parking garage with 558 spaces. The development will incorporate the facade of the original station building. The development was slated to break ground in the summer of 2023, open its transit center by May 2024, and finish construction on its apartments by the spring of 2025. The new parking structure and waiting area opened in June 2025.

==== Potential impact on development in Michigan City ====
In addition to the new intermodal hub development, since the start of construction of the double tracking project (expected to lessen the commute between Michigan City and Chicago to roughly an hour, removing roughly 30 minutes from the commute time), numerous planned developments have been announced in Michigan City. Many have attributed this directly to the double tracking. In November 2021, a developer announced plans for a $35 million mixed-use development featuring 200 apartments on the corner of Eighth Street and Michigan Boulevard, a location near the station. In the years before the groundbreaking of the double track project, Michigan City had already been working towards redeveloping its surrounding central Uptown area into an arts district, with faster train service between Michigan City and Chicago being seen as a key generator for the fulfillment that goal. Since the groundbreaking of double track project, a number of major developments have been announced for other parts of the city as well, such as a $150 million mixed-use hotel and apartment development near the city's City Hall. The leader of the Economic Development Corp. Michigan City stated that the group of projects generated by the improved rail service will create 800 new multi-family residential units in Michigan City in a period of a decade.

== Bus connections ==
Michigan City Transit (at Franklin/11th Street intersection)

- Route 1
- Route 2
- Route 4

== See also ==
- Michigan City station, a former Amtrak station that served Michigan City, Indiana
