= Disney Character Warehouse =

Disney outlet stores in Orlando, Florida

The Disney Character Warehouse (branded as Disney's Character Warehouse) is a pair of outlet stores in Orlando, Florida, operated by Disney Parks and staffed by Disney cast members. The stores sell surplus and retired merchandise from the nearby Walt Disney World resort, typically at discounts of 50 to 70 percent off original park prices. One store is located at the Orlando International Premium Outlets on International Drive and the other at the Orlando Vineland Premium Outlets near Lake Buena Vista. A third location at Sawgrass Mills in Sunrise, Florida operated until April 2026.

== History ==
The stores closed temporarily during the COVID-19 pandemic in Florida and reopened on September 17, 2020.

In August 2024, Disney offered Walt Disney World annual passholders a 20 percent discount at all three then-open locations, the chain's first publicized discount program, and later extended it through mid-September 2024.

Effective February 1, 2026, all sales at the stores became final, with no refunds, returns, or exchanges, a change reported as an effort to deter resellers.

The Sawgrass Mills location closed permanently on April 15, 2026, after Disney opted not to renew its lease at the mall.

A new location is under construction at Tampa Premium Outlets in Wesley Chapel, Florida, listed by the mall as coming soon. Local reporting in August 2026 pointed to a winter 2026 opening.

== Merchandise and operations ==
The stores carry overstock and discontinued items from the Disney theme parks, including apparel, ear headbands, pins, plush toys, and merchandise from limited-time park events. Inventory consists of whatever surplus arrives from the parks and is not published in advance. The chain has no online store and does not offer shipping.

During busy periods, the stores admit shoppers through a free on-site virtual queue, which can only be joined at the store.

Unlike Disney Store locations, which are run by Disney's consumer products retail arm, the Character Warehouse stores are operated by Disney Parks with their cast members.

== See also ==
- Disney Store
