= Serpent Safari =

Coordinates: 42°23′20″N 87°57′27″W

- Interactive map of Serpent Safari
- Date opened: 1999
- Date closed: 2013
- Location: Gurnee, Illinois, United States
- Website: www.serpentsafari.net

Serpent Safari was a reptile zoo located inside the Gurnee Mills Mall in Gurnee, Illinois, a suburb of Chicago. The zoo advertised itself as "America's Finest Reptile Zoo". The zoo housed some rare specimens, including the world's heaviest snake (over 375 lbs. as of February 2010), an albino alligator, and an alligator snapping turtle estimated at 150 years old. A gift shop offered pets, a photo area where guests could get their photos taken with a large python or boa, and a reptile zoo with guided tours.

A female Burmese Python named "Baby" that lived 27 years at the Serpent Safari was confirmed by Guinness World Records as the heaviest living snake in captivity, weighing 183 kilograms (403 lb). After death, her actual length was determined to be 5.74 m (18 ft 10 in) which is the maximum length record for this species so far.

Serpent Safari originally opened in the Wisconsin Dells in 1987 and was co-owned by Lou Daddono and Paul Keeler. The Wisconsin location was in Parkway Mall at 1425 Wisconsin Dells Parkway, Wisconsin Dells, Wisconsin. Daddano made headlines in February 1998 when he was attacked by a reticulated python. The 23 ft. wild-caught snake bit Daddano while he was cleaning the cage and constricted around his neck until he passed out.

The Gurnee location opened in 1998 and was the first reptile zoo to be located inside a mall. The store was featured on PBS, Discovery Channel, and Oprah.

Serpent Safari closed on April 17, 2013, after 15 years in operation at the Gurnee Mills Mall. Approximately 25 of the larger reptiles were relocated to Alligator Alley in Wisconsin Dells. About 50 smaller animals such as turtles, lizards, and frogs, were sold to the public.
