= Barbie Dreamhouse =

Children's toy for sale since 1962

Barbie Dreamhouse (sometimes stylized DreamHouse) is a dollhouse introduced by Mattel in 1962. The toys have several rooms, Barbie accessories, and recognizable features like a pink slide and elevator. Dreamhouses are designed to be “architecturally implausible” according to Carol Spencer, who designed Barbie’s outfits from 1963 to 1999. According to Lisa McKnight, the global head of Mattel’s Barbie and dolls portfolio, “Dreamhouse owners buy twice as many Barbie toys as non-Dreamhouse owners.” Real-life exhibits of the house have been built. In 2023, physical versions were built in Malibu and at studios in Great Britain to promote the 2023 Barbie film, which led to a pink paint shortage.

== History ==
Mattel debuted the Dreamhouse in 1962, three years after Barbie hit the market, and at a time when it was rare for a woman to own her own home. The first Dreamhouse was made of cardboard and had one room. It had a television set, a record player, and no kitchen.

By 1974, the Barbie Dreamhouse was a townhouse with three stories and six rooms. In 1979, as cities shrunk, the house was a suburban-seeming A-frame with two stories and six rooms. The house was modular, meaning that children could deconstruct the rooms and rearrange them.

In 1990, the Dreamhouse was a two story McMansion with a glittery pink exterior. By 2008, the house remained pink but returned to the three-story townhouse shape that was sold in 1974. It featured a garage for Barbie's convertible. The 2013 Dreamhouse, which sold for $189, featured an elevator just for clothes and a TV that switched channels. In 2016, some of the high-tech Dreamhouse developments like voice command didn't function properly.

By 2021, Barbie's Dreamhouse had a home office with a laptop. When the doll with a wheelchair, introduced in 2019, didn't fit in the house's elevator, Mattel re-designed the elevator to fit the wheelchair.

== About ==
In 2023, its retail value was reported as $199.99. The dollhouse stands at nearly 4 feet tall. It has influenced design to be Barbiecore pink. It is featured prominently in Life in the Dreamhouse (2012–2015) and Dreamhouse Adventures (2018–2020) series.

== Life-size versions ==
=== Tourist exhibits ===
In May 2013, the Barbie Dreamhouse Experience opened at Sawgrass Mills, a Florida shopping mall that is the second-biggest tourist attraction in Florida after Walt Disney World. Shortly thereafter, a 25,000 square feet (2,300 m^{2}) Barbie Dreamhouse Experience exhibit was opened near Alexanderplatz in downtown Berlin from May 16 to August 25. The house featured a large pink high heel-shaped fountain, walk-in closet, walk-in fridge, and a pink dolphin popping out of the toilet bowl. It drew controversy from feminist groups and topless protestors waving burning crosses outside the exhibit. It then toured Europe.

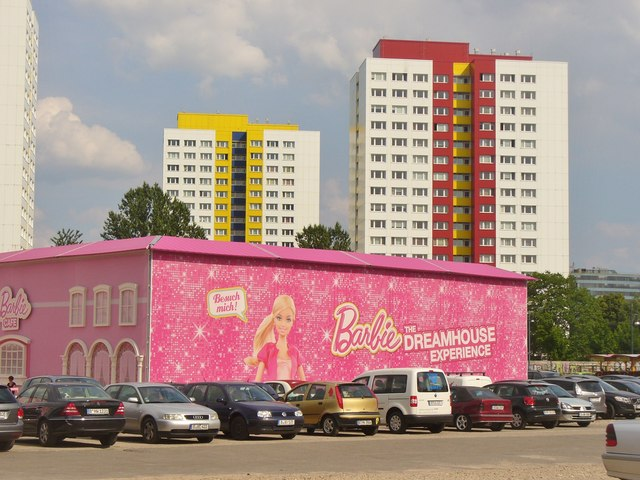
Barbie Dreamhouse Experience in Berlin photographed in June 2013

=== Malibu ===
Interior decorator Jonathan Adler, commissioned by Mattel, decorated a 3,500-square-foot house on the Pacific Ocean as a Barbie Dreamhouse in March 2009 for Barbie’s 50th birthday. “Barbie was a dream client because she doesn’t exist as a person,” Adler said to the San Diego Union Tribune.

In Malibu, a three-story pink Dreamhouse is available for rent on Airbnb. The home, spotted on June 25 by a CBS Los Angeles photojournalist, contains a slide, "Kendom Saloon," roller rink, and pool with big letters floating in the water that spell “KEN.” According to the listing, the host is Ken and a concierge will provide meals and tours. The life-size Barbie Dreamhouse Airbnb was previously available for a weekend from October 27–29, 2019. In 2023, bookings for the Dreamhouse open on July 17 and the stay will occur from July 21 and 22.

=== 2023 movie set ===
The set of the 2023 film Barbie, at the Warner Brothers Studios lot near London, is several pink buildings with neither windows nor doors. Located on the "Barbie Way Cul-de-Sac," it features a slide, a pool, and an extensive walk-in closet. Director Greta Gerwig told Architectural Digest “We were literally creating the alternate universe of Barbie Land." Production designer Sarah Greenwood and set decorator Katie Spencer, the same duo that designed sets for Pride & Prejudice and Anna Karenina, were inspired by Palm Springs style midcentury modern decor. Behind the set is a painted backdrop of the San Jacinto Mountains of Southern California.
