= Gurnee Mills =

Shopping mall in Lake County, Illinois, U.S.

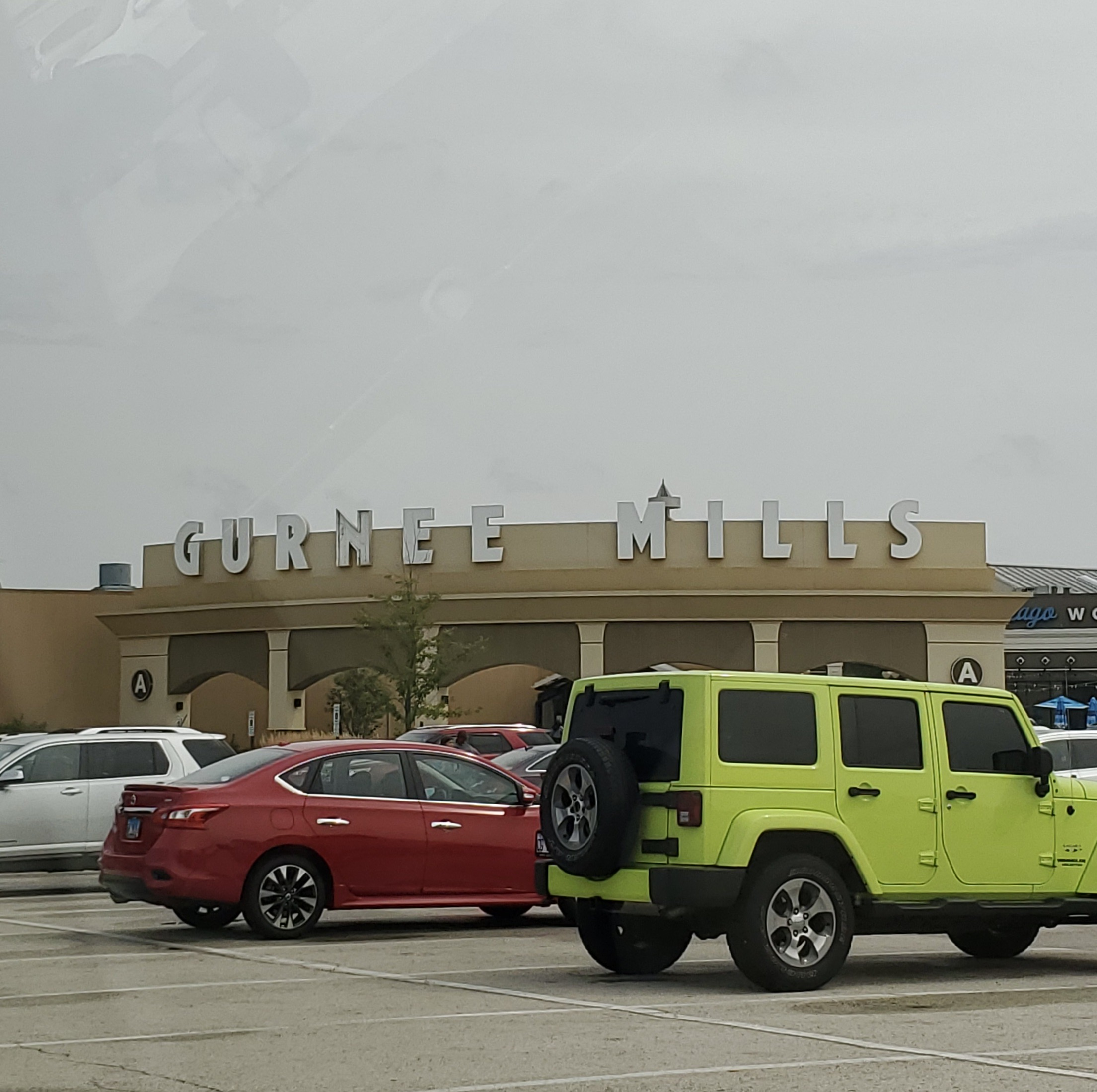
- Entrance A (September 2020)
- Location: Gurnee, Illinois, U.S.
- Coordinates: 42°23′20″N 87°57′27″W
- Address: 6170 W. Grand Ave, 60031
- Opened: August 8, 1991; 35 years ago
- Developer: Western Development Corporation
- Manager: Simon Property Group
- Owner: Simon Property Group
- Architect: CambridgeSeven; Rory McCarthy Design
- Num. of stores: 200+ (at peak)
- Num. of anchor tenants: 18 (at peak)
- Floor area: 1,936,699 square feet (179,925.2 m^{2})
- Floors: 1
- Public transit: Pace
- Website: www.simon.com/mall/gurnee-mills
- Building details

Design and construction
- Main contractor: W.E. O'Neil Construction

Renovating team
- Renovating firm: Simon Property Group

Gurnee Mills is a super-regional shopping mall in Gurnee, Illinois, within the Chicago metropolitan area. With 1,936,699 square feet (179,925 m^{2}) of gross leasable area and ten major anchor stores in its Z-shaped single-story building, it is the third largest shopping mall in Illinois, and one of the four shopping centers in Lake County.

Owned and operated by Simon Property Group, it was an early part of the "Landmark Mills" chain of shopping malls developed by Western Development Corporation (which completed a corporate spin-off in 1994 as Mills Corporation).

Gurnee Mills features a variety of manufacturer outlets in addition to the more typical mall retailers. It is a popular attraction for tourists visiting the Chicago area, with thousands of tour buses making stops at the mall each year. The mall draws more than 20 million visitors annually.

== History ==
=== Background ===
The land where Gurnee Mills stands today was plotted out as part of Section 16 of Warren Township. Most of it was owned by the prominent Lamb family from 1837 until it was sold to the mall's developers in 1988. The corner of Grand Avenue and Hunt Club Road was long known as Lamb's Corners, where various members of the family farmed and operated a long succession of small businesses. When the latest generation of the family sold the land to be developed, they had some conditions, primarily that the oldest trees on the property be preserved and the wetlands along the highway be kept intact.

=== 1988–1991: Development and opening ===
Western Development Corporation of Washington, D.C. first announced its plans to build a super-regional shopping center in Lake County, Illinois in 1988. The plan was to annex 324 acres (131 ha) of unincorporated land near the intersection of the Tri-State Tollway and Grand Avenue, on which the mall would be built, into the village of Gurnee. Gurnee Mills would become the fourth mall in Western Development's Landmark Mills chain, after Potomac Mills, which opened in September 1985, and Franklin Mills and Sawgrass Mills, which were under construction at the time. Western Development later completed a corporate spin-off itself as Mills Corporation after its malls in April 1994, making Gurnee Mills the last Mills-branded mall developed under Western. Local residents were concerned that the mall would steal customers from small local businesses and existing malls like Waukegan's nearby Lakehurst Mall and the Pleasant Prairie Premium Outlets, while Western Development was worried that Gurnee was too small to handle the construction project, despite the success of Six Flags Great America down the road. The Cambridge, Massachusetts-based CambridgeSeven was selected as the lead architect, while Rory McCarthy Design handled the interior.

Construction on the mall, which was projected to cost $160 million, began with a groundbreaking ceremony on July 19, 1989. By this time, plans had been expanded and the construction site consisted of 422 acres (171 ha) of farm fields and wetlands. At the ceremony, four anchor retailers were announced: Sears Outlet, Reading China and Glass, Phar-Mor, and the Gurnee Mills Family Entertainment Center, a children's amusement area modeled after the 49th Street Galleria in Salt Lake City. A total of 1.6 million hours of work went into the construction process, which took 25 months.

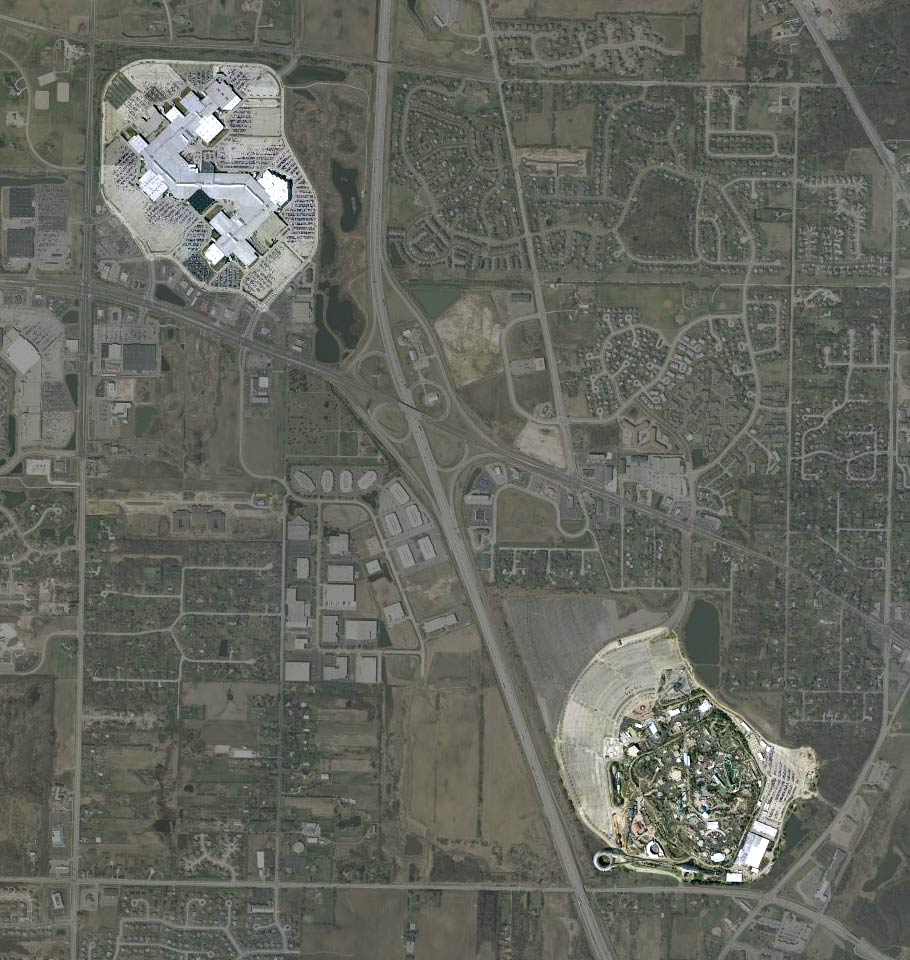
A satellite view of Gurnee Mills (top left) shows the nearby Six Flags Great America (bottom right).

The mall opened to the public at 8 a.m. EDT on August 8, 1991, allowing 70,000 visitors to see the place before stores opened at 10 a.m. The mall's architecture and design were themed after "the agrarian heartland", a look inspired by its rural setting and taking after a wide variety of sources, from the Googie-style diners of the 1950s to Frank Lloyd Wright's Prairie School architecture. Unlike with most malls of its size, the stores at Gurnee Mills are all on a single level, and oriented along a single Z-shaped corridor that runs for 4,400 ft (1,300 m). 70% of the mall's retail spaces were leased at the time of the mall's opening, including seven of the ten anchors: Sears, Phar-Mor, Spiegel, Marshalls, Bed Bath & Beyond, Waccamaw Pottery, and the Family Entertainment Center. An eighth anchor, Filene's Basement, opened in October.

=== 1991–2007: Early years ===
With about 200 retail spaces and two separate food courts – the Dine-O-Rama and the Lake County Fare – Gurnee Mills was intended from the beginning as a state-of-the-art mall, with high-tech features like a television studio where mall-specific commercials could be produced and shown on the mall's 55 monitors, and its 15 ft (5 m) "video wall." The Family Entertainment Center featured a video arcade and other attractions for children. These features were intended to help turn the mall into a center for entertainment, not just for shopping, as the Mills Corporation felt entertainment was the future for shopping malls. One marketing study found Gurnee Mills was so large that many shoppers preferred to drive to the other side of the parking lot rather than walk to the other end of the mall.

Advertised as the "world's largest outlet mall", Gurnee Mills faced confusion from local consumers over the fact that it featured full-price stores as well as discount outlets, and the first six months of profits were lower than Western Development and the Gurnee tax base were hoping for. Some retailers were satisfied with the mall's financial performance, while others were disappointed but optimistic.Phar-Mor, on the other hand, closed its store after one year of disappointing sales, becoming the first anchor to leave.Additions to the mall continued in 1993, with a new retail space constructed for Burlington Coat Factory, as well as Foot Locker, Syms, and The Clearinghouse by Saks Fifth Avenue opening that fall. Circuit City opened in the area around the mall on November 24, and a ten-screen movie theater, one of Marcus Theatres' first Illinois locations, opened at the mall on December 10. That year, Sears closed its chain of catalog outlet stores, leaving a space which was filled by a Macy's Close-Out store and later by JCPenney. The vacant space left by Phar-Mor was finally filled by Value City in 1995. Also in 1995, Sam's Club and Walmart, which later became a Supercenter, opened across the street from the mall on the northwest corner of Hunt Club and Grand Ave.

By 1995, Gurnee Mills was the second-most popular tourist attraction in Illinois, behind the rival Woodfield Mall, drawing 14.4 million visitors and 2,300 tour buses in a year. Capitalizing on this growth and the idea of the mall as a regional entertainment destination, major new developments began to be added to Gurnee Mills, beginning with the Rainforest Cafe in 1996. The Mills Corporation announced its plans to invest $50 million into expanding the mall in 1997, beginning with the July opening of a Planet Hollywood restaurant, the second location in Illinois. Another major addition was the Bass Pro Shops Outdoor World, second in a chain of heavily themed outdoor recreation destination superstores, in November 1997. The former location of Filene's Basement was combined with other spaces to create the new 133,000 ft^{2} (12,400 m^{2}) anchor store, the mall's largest retail space. Previously this space was intended to hold an Incredible Universe store before plans fell through in 1996.

Original logo for Gurnee Mills (1991–2014)

The focus on entertainment and experiences over shopping continued through the late 1990s, as the dot-com boom threatened to cut into the profits of traditional retailers. Serpent Safari, the first reptile zoo and store to be located in a shopping mall, opened next to the Rainforest Cafe in January 1999, and in August, Rink Side Sports, an entertainment facility centered around an NHL-sized ice rink, was added to the existing arcade and children's play area. These efforts were heralded as a success: 21 million people visited the mall in 1998, representing a growth of 30% in three years.

Bearing out the concerns of local residents, Lakehurst Mall closed in 2001 after the few remaining tenants pulled out Lakehurst was also suffering from the early 2000s recession, which affected Gurnee Mills as well: the mall lost two major anchors in 2001—Syms and Waccamaw Furniture—and a third in 2002 when Spiegel closed its retail chain. Two of these vacant spaces were filled fairly quickly, with Kohl's lined up to replace Spiegel before the latter even closed, and Circuit City, previously located in a separate building outside the mall, moving in to replace Syms.

A decade after closing its outlet store in the mall, Sears returned to Gurnee Mills with a 201,000 ft^{2} (18,700 m^{2}) Sears Grand hypermarket store in 2004, replacing and expanding the vacant space formerly home to Waccamaw Pottery. On its opening, Sears Grand became the largest store at Gurnee Mills, and it was the second of its kind after the store in Jordan Landing in West Jordan, Utah. Unlike most Sears Grand locations, the store in Gurnee was directly attached to a shopping mall, and after the Sears Grand at Pittsburgh Mills closed in 2015, it became the only mall-attached Sears Grand location until its own closure in 2018. The introduction of new, full-price department stores like Sears and Kohl's represented the beginning of the mall's "third life", as retail analysts described it, following its period as an outlet mall and as an entertainment center. In 2005, a Wannado City theme park was planned for the mall. Plans continued to be developed through 2007, but both companies faced financial downturns and the project was never realized. Nike opened on May 22, 2006.

=== 2007–2018: Simon Property Group ===
The Mills Corporation faced severe financial problems in 2006 after the Securities & Exchange Commission found that management had made $350 million in accounting errors during the previous four years. Almost all existing Mills malls in the U.S. were sold to Simon Property Group and Farallon Capital Management in April 2007. From early on in the mall's new ownership, Simon expressed discontentment with the aging decor of the mall, particularly the agricultural theming, which had not been updated since the mall's opening in 1991. After weathering the 2008 financial crisis, Simon announced its plans for a major $5 million renovation of the mall in 2010, updating the style and the facilities of the mall to make it more "sophisticated."

Neiman Marcus Last Call Clearance Center would open in 2009, which has since been replaced by a 2nd & Charles book store. That same year, JCPenney closed its Clearance Center, which was replaced by Shoppers World in 2011. Meanwhile, Simon announced in 2011 that it would demolish the vacant former Circuit City location entirely and construct an entirely new building for a Macy's department store at one end of the building, and remodel an area between Kohl's and Value City Furniture to create a "full price wing." Simon promised that these new developments would turn it into the "first true hybrid center" and change its "personality." The new stores opened on July 24, 2013, in time for the mall's 22nd anniversary, with the promise of other retailers following Macy's path, and "positioning Gurnee Mills for another 20 years of relevance". The upgrades mirrored those being done by Simon at the dozens of other Mills malls, as part of a nationwide strategy to remake them into "timeless" shopping centers. Buy Buy Baby moved into the Bed Bath & Beyond space in 2012, turning it into a combined store with the two sharing the floor space. In March 2012, Simon Property Group acquired full control of the property by buying out Farallon's stake in the Mills portfolio for $1.5 billion.

Floor & Decor opened on January 14, 2017, replacing Shoppers World. Another round of renovations, with a budget of $6 million, began in September 2017. The mall's food courts were redeveloped into the Dining Pavilion North and South at Gurnee Mills. The Rink Side Sports ice rink had been closed since April 15, after a series of "catastrophic" equipment failures, but a plan to reopen the rink under the new management of the Tilt Studio video arcade was announced in October. Dick's Sporting Goods opened at Gurnee Mills in April 2018, taking over the former space of Sports Authority, a plan which was inadvertently revealed early by a Gurnee village trustee.

=== 2018–present ===
On May 31, 2018, it was announced that Sears Grand would be closing as part of a plan to close 72 stores nationwide. The store closed on September 2, 2018, and has been divided. The middle portion became Hobby Lobby on January 28, 2022; while the right portion became Round1 Bowling & Arcade, which opened in July 2024. Rink Side Sports/Tilt Studio closed in 2020, and was replaced by Top Shelf Ice Arena, which opened in 2021.

On September 15, 2022, it was announced that Bed Bath & Beyond would be closing as part of a plan to close 150 stores nationwide.

In 2024, Fave Pizza, ramen restaurant RamenYa, and Thai restaurant Thai Esane opened at the mall. This was along with four new retail shops which included lifestyle and fashion brand Charlotte Russe, jewelry brand Pandora, Japanese retailer Ebisu and gift jewelry shop The Inspiration Co. On December 10, 2024, The RoomPlace closed as part of their going out of business sale.

In 2025, Forever 21 closed after the chain filed for bankruptcy and closed all stores.

As of 2025, five new stores are expected to open at the mall throughout 2025 and into 2026. Boot Barn, an outlet store called HEYDUDE, Primark, Reclectic, and Rue21. New restaurants also opened throughout the mall.

Near the mall property, Texas Roadhouse opened on February 10, 2025, and Ashley Furniture would open on April 12 of that year, with the latter taking over the former space of Toys "R" Us. In October 2025, Sky Zone announced that it would be opening a large 40,103 sq ft (3,725.7 m^{2}) location at the mall where The RoomPlace store formerly was. This new location is part of the company’s major expansion of new trampoline parks across the United States. Sky Zone is expected to open in 2026.

On November 23 of that year, Value City filed for Chapter 11 bankruptcy and announced it would be closing 33 stores including the store in Gurnee Mills. The store closed by the end of 2025.

In February 2026, it was announced that IKEA would be opening a 66,000 sq ft (6,100 m^{2}) store in the left portion of the former Sears Grand anchor space. This store is set to become the third IKEA in Illinois but will be smaller in size as IKEA has begun opening differently sized store formats attached to indoor shopping malls that can fit the space in addition to their regular sized stores. The opening date for IKEA is fall 2026.

== See also ==
- Algonquin Mills in Rolling Meadows, Illinois
