= Shoppers World (retail chain) =

American discount department store chain

- Company type: Private
- Industry: Retail
- Founded: 1972; 54 years ago
- Headquarters: New York City, U.S.
- Number of locations: 36 (March 2018)
- Area served: Connecticut, Georgia, Illinois, Indiana, Maryland, Michigan, Nevada, New Jersey, New York, Ohio, Pennsylvania, Texas, Virginia
- Key people: Sam Dushey Sr., Founder; Sam Dushey, CEO
- Products: Clothing, footwear, bedding, jewelry, beauty products, housewares, electronics, movies, toys, and furniture
- Revenue: US$ 250 million (2015)
- Owner: SW Group, LLC
- Website: shoppersworldusa.com

Shoppers World is a retail chain of discount department stores headquartered in New York. It has approximately 40 locations, mostly in the eastern United States. It is operated by the SW Group, controlled by the Dushey family.

== History ==
Shoppers World traces its founding to the 1930s, when Sam Dushey Sr. founded "The Mart" in Baltimore, Maryland. In the 1950s, Dushey opened the Pitkin Bargain Center on Pitkin Avenue in Brooklyn, New York. Dushey opened the first Shoppers World store in Elizabeth, New Jersey, in 1972.

In 2015, CEO Sam Dushey went undercover in Shoppers World stores for an episode of the TV show Undercover Boss.
