= Michigan City station =

Former Amtrak station in Indiana

Michigan City, IN
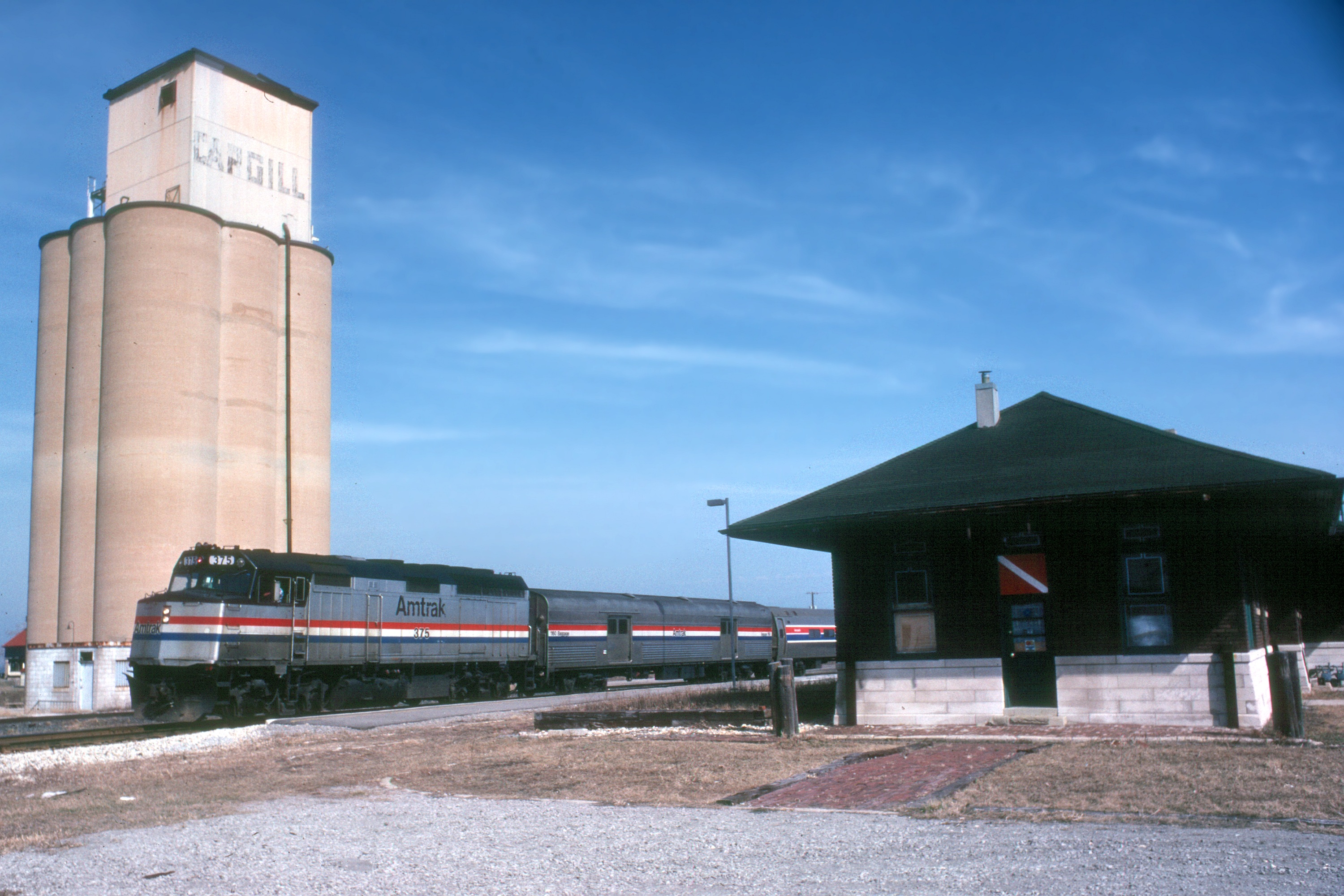
- The Wolverine at Michigan City station in March 1983

General information
- Location: 100 Washington Street; Michigan City, Indiana; United States
- Coordinates: 41°43′16″N 86°54′20″W
- Line: Amtrak Michigan Line
- Platforms: 1 side platform
- Tracks: 2

Construction
- Accessible: Yes

Other information
- Station code: Amtrak: MCI

History
- Opened: April 26, 1981
- Closed: April 4, 2022

Former services
Preceding station	Amtrak	Following station
Hammond–Whiting toward Chicago	Wolverine	New Buffalo toward Pontiac
Preceding station	New York Central Railroad	Following station
Porter toward Chicago	Michigan Central Railroad Main Line	Grand Beach toward Buffalo
Preceding station	Nickel Plate Road	Following station
Terminus	Michigan City – Indianapolis (before 1933)	La Porte toward Indianapolis
Location

Michigan City station was a train station in Michigan City, Indiana served by Amtrak, the national railroad passenger system. It was served by two eastbound and one westbound Wolverine train at the time of closure; other Wolverine and Blue Water trains did not stop. The station had a platform shelter near the former prairie-style Michigan Central Railroad depot dating from 1915, which was converted into a local restaurant. The restaurant closed not long after the station closed. That earlier station served Michigan Central Railroad, and later, New York Central passenger trains. Major NYC named trains passing through the station included the Canadian (east to Detroit and Toronto), the Chicago Mercury (east to Detroit) and the Wolverine (east to New York via Detroit and southwestern Canada, in contrast to the modern train).

Service began at the new Amtrak station on April 26, 1981. The station closed effective April 4, 2022. No official reason was given for the closure, and passengers were advised to instead use the New Buffalo station 10 miles (16 km) east. The electric interurban South Shore Line, which operates between South Bend and Chicago, stops at 11th Street station roughly a mile to the south.
