= Treasure Coast Square =

Coordinates: 27.242178°N 80.2746426°W

- Location: Martin County, Florida
- Opened: 1987
- Developer: Edward J. DeBartolo Corp
- Manager: Simon Property Group
- Owner: Simon Property Group
- Num. of stores: 115
- Num. of anchor tenants: 5
- Floor area: 876,257 square feet (81,406.9 square meters)
- Floors: 1 (2 in Dillard's and Macy's)
- Website: simon.com/mall/treasure-coast-square

Treasure Coast Square is a shopping mall in Martin County, Florida, United States. It comprises 115 stores, including anchor stores Dillard's, JCPenney, Macy's, Elev8 Fun, as well as a food court and Regal 16-screen movie theater. The mall, managed by Simon Property Group, opened in 1987 and was designed by Edward J. DeBartolo.

== History ==
Developed by Edward J. DeBartolo, the mall opened in 1987 with original anchor tenants J. C. Penney, Jordan Marsh, and Lord & Taylor. The mall's opening caused the decline of the existing Martin Square Mall in nearby Stuart, from which J. C. Penney relocated, and Boca Mall (now known as Mizner Park) in Boca Raton.

The opening of the mall attracted nearly 800,000 square feet of new retail development in its area in the first ten years.

In 2025, an anchor tenant replaced the Sears department store, which closed in February 2019. Elev8 Fun opened a new 115,000-square foot indoor family entertainment park on May 9, 2025.

A redevelopment study released in summer 2026 by the Treasure Coast Regional Planning Council and Simon Property Group proposes a gradual replacement of portions of the enclosed mall with tree-lined streets, green space, and open-air shopping.
