= Round Rock Premium Outlets =

- Location: Round Rock, Texas
- Address: 4401 N Interstate 35, Round Rock, TX 78664
- Opened: August 2006
- Developer: Centra Properties
- Manager: Simon Premium Outlets
- Owner: Simon Property Group
- Architect: Development Design Group; Alan J. Mayer Architect; Marnell Corrao Associates
- Num. of stores: 125+
- Num. of anchor tenants: 6
- Floor area: 435,000 sq ft (40,400 m^{2})
- Floors: 2-3
- Parking: 5,800
- Website: www.premiumoutlets.com/outlet/round-rock

Round Rock Premium Outlets is a 430,000-square-foot (40,000 m^{2}) shopping mall located in Round Rock, Texas located on 200 acres (81 ha). It is owned and managed by Simon Property Group, and part of Simon's Premium Outlets family of outlet malls. The shopping center has 125 stores.

== History ==
The mall opened in August 2006 with 430,000 square feet (40,000 m^{2}) of space.
