= Houston Premium Outlets =

- Location: Cypress, Texas, United States
- Coordinates: 29°59′48.51″N 95°45′24.67″W
- Address: 29300 Hempstead Road
- Opened: March 27, 2008 (18 years ago)
- Developer: Simon Property Group
- Manager: Simon Premium Outlets
- Owner: Simon Property Group
- Floors: 1
- Website: www.premiumoutlets.com/outlet/houston

Houston Premium Outlets is an outlet mall in Cypress, Texas, United States. It is developed and owned by Simon Property Group. The mall started construction in May 2007 and opened on March 27, 2008, with 120 outlet stores. Houston Premium Outlets has about 430,000 square feet (40,000 m^{2}) of retail space.

== Shopping Center ==
Houston Premium Outlets is a one-story complex of buildings that sits on 3.6 million square feet (0.34 km^{2}) of total land, located just off of US-290 at the Fairfield Place Drive exit. Immediately surrounding it is the Fairfield community. The mall has 3 wings with a main entrance at its south part.

In March 2022, LongHorn Steakhouse opened a new location in the mall, being the first dine-in restaurant in Houston Premium Outlets.

== History ==
In 2018, Houston Premium Outlets underwent major renovations, and added an Old Navy and Polo Ralph Lauren Factory Store.

In April 2022, the mall started a program with Cypress Ranch High School (in nearby Cypress-Fairbanks ISD) to promote recycling and sustainability.

=== Crime ===
On October 27, 2018, a man was shot in the mall parking lot and was treated at a local hospital with minor injuries.

On July 15, 2019, a woman stole $16,000 worth of merchandise from different stores in the mall.

On February 26, 2020, a man was wanted by police for taking an inappropriate video of a customer at Finish Line and having many similar additional videos and photos on his phone.

On December 18, 2021, 2 men stole saws and catalytic converters worth a total of $9,000.
