= Rio Grande Valley Premium Outlets =

Shopping center in Mercedes, Texas, US

Coordinates: 26.162806°N 97.888271°W

Rio Grande Valley Premium Outlets is a 578,000-square-foot (53,700 m^{2}) shopping center located in Mercedes, Texas, located on Interstate 2 (Expressway 83). It is owned and managed by Simon Property Group, and part of Simon's Premium Outlets family of outlet malls. The shopping center has 140 stores.

== History ==
The shopping center was opened in 2006 with 578,000 square feet (53,700 m^{2}) of space. It was expanded in 2008.
