= Camarillo Premium Outlets =

- Camarillo Premium Outlets sign in 2026
- Location: Camarillo, California
- Coordinates: 34°12′58″N 119°03′40″W
- Address: 40 Ventura Blvd, Camarillo, CA
- Opened: 24 November 1995
- Developer: Chelsea GCA Realty; Koll Leonard Co.
- Owner: Simon's Premium Outlets
- Num. of stores: 160
- Floors: 1

Camarillo Premium Outlets (formerly called the Camarillo Factory Outlets) is an open-air outlet mall located in Camarillo, California. Camarillo Premium Outlets is owned and managed by the Simon Property Group. The Camarillo Premium Outlets include around 160 stores, including Versace and Jimmy Choo.

== History ==
In 1991, the Sammis Corporation proposed to build a shopping center in Camarillo, although it would receive opposition from homeowner groups. From October 1992 to April 1994, Stephen J. Maulhardt, who was formerly the president of the Oxnard Chamber of Commerce, attempted to file lawsuits against the city of Camarillo, claiming that the city had violated the California Environmental Quality Act by approving the project. Construction for the outlet mall began in August 1994. The Camarillo Premium Outlets would first open in November of 1995, with a further expansion of the mall in 1997. By 2003, the shopping center had attracted around 10 million visitors per year. In 2009, Camarillo Premium Outlets received another expansion after being bought by Simon Property Group.
