= Pleasant Prairie Premium Outlets =

- Location: Pleasant Prairie, Wisconsin, United States
- Coordinates: 42°31′1″N 87°56′54″W
- Opened: September 1988
- Developer: McArthurGlen Group
- Manager: Simon Property Group
- Owner: Simon Property Group
- Num. of stores: 88
- Floor area: 402,524 ft^{2} (37,396 m^{2})
- Floors: 1 (open-air)
- Website: www.premiumoutlets.com/outlet/pleasant-prairie

Pleasant Prairie Premium Outlets, formerly Lakeside Marketplace and Prime Outlets at Kenosha, is an open-air outlet mall in Pleasant Prairie, Wisconsin, a suburb of Kenosha located near the border with Illinois and which is part of the greater Chicago metropolitan area. The mall sits next to Interstate 94, and is approximately 50 miles north of Chicago and 40 miles south of Milwaukee, Wisconsin. The mall was developed by the McArthurGlen Group, and was built in stages between 1988 and 1992. Since 2010, it has been owned by Simon Property Group and managed as part of Simon's Premium Outlets division.

== History ==
Plans for Lakeside Marketplace were announced by Glen Investors, a subsidiary of McArthurGlen Group based in Washington, D.C., in January 1988. At the time, the Kenosha area already had an outlet mall in Bristol, the Factory Outlet Centre, which had been built in 1982, three miles further north along Interstate 94. Construction proceeded quickly, with some stores opening for business as early as September 1988. A grand opening ceremony was held for the first phase of the mall, consisting of 23 stores and 75,000 square feet of space, on November 2, 1988, with Lieutenant Governor Scott McCallum cutting the ceremonial ribbon. Major manufacturers with outlet stores in the first phase included Liz Claiborne and Calvin Klein.

The mall's second phase added another 17 stores, including J. Crew, Oleg Cassini, and Benetton, as well as an Oshkosh B'Gosh outlet which moved from the Factory Outlet Centre in Bristol to Lakeside Marketplace. The second phase opened on October 19, 1989, by which time construction was already underway on a further expansion of the mall. Phase III added 20 more stores and was completed in August 1990. The fourth and final phase of the mall, as originally planned, opened on February 15, 1992. Lakeside Marketplace was then considered complete, with a total of 76 stores and restaurants in 269,300 square feet of space.

According to the Kenosha News in 1990, most customers at Lakeside Marketplace came from out of town, particularly the Chicago area, and few Kenosha residents shopped there. The mall was the second most popular tourist attraction in Kenosha County, behind only Dairyland Greyhound Park. Before construction on the mall was complete, McArthurGlen offered to sell an ownership stake in the property as the developer tried to raise funds for future projects. The opening of the much larger Gurnee Mills outlet mall, 10 miles south of Pleasant Prairie, in August 1991 added new competition for both of Kenosha County's outlet malls.

In 1995, McArthurGlen merged with Horizon Outlet Centers of Muskegon, Michigan to form Horizon Group Inc., also known as HGI Realty. Horizon sold 22 of its outlet malls, including Lakeside Marketplace, to Prime Retail LP on June 15, 1998. Immediately after the sale was finalized, Lakeside Marketplace was rebranded as "Prime Outlets at Kenosha".

The mall was substantially expanded and renovated in 2006. Phases I and II of the original mall (now known as South Plaza), as well as one corner of Phases III and IV (now North Plaza), were partially torn down to allow for easier movement between the shops on either side. A third retail area, East Plaza, was built behind North Plaza. At the center of the mall area, The Eatery Dining Pavilion was added, with a prominent clock tower. These changes were planned as early as 1999, but construction did not begin until the summer of 2006. Many of the tenants in the new addition came from Bristol's outlet mall, which was demolished the same year after a long decline in sales. The expanded Prime Outlets held a ribbon-cutting ceremony at midnight on Black Friday, November 24, 2006.

Prime Outlets was purchased by Simon Property Group in September 2010, and the malls were added to Simon's Premium Outlets division. With the change in ownership, the mall was renamed Pleasant Prairie Premium Outlets.
