= Johnson Creek Premium Outlets =

- Location: Johnson Creek, Wisconsin, United States
- Coordinates: 43°05′24″N 88°45′47″W
- Opened: May 1998
- Developer: JMJ Properties
- Manager: Simon Premium Outlets
- Owner: Simon Property Group
- Num. of stores: 62
- Floor area: 277,663 ft^{2} (25,796 m^{2})
- Floors: 1 (open-air)
- Website: www.premiumoutlets.com/outlet/johnson-creek

Johnson Creek Premium Outlets, formerly Johnson Creek Outlet Center, is an open-air outlet mall in Johnson Creek, Wisconsin. The mall sits next to Interstate 94, and is approximately 45 miles (72 km) west of Milwaukee and 35 miles (56 km) east of Madison, the two largest cities in Wisconsin. The mall was developed by JMJ Properties, and was built in stages between 1998 and 2001. Since 2004, it has been owned by Simon Property Group and managed as part of Simon's Premium Outlets division.

== History ==
The mall was originally developed by JMJ Properties of Muskegon, Michigan. The southern portion of the mall, featuring 39 stores and totaling 170,172 square feet (15,809.5 m^{2}), held its grand opening on May 22, 1998, although about half of the stores participated in a soft opening the weekend before that. The second phase of the mall added another 17 stores, and its grand opening was held on June 18, 1999. The third and final phase brought the mall to a total of 62 stores and restaurants in 278,000 square feet (25,800 m^{2}) of space.

JMJ Properties sold the Johnson Creek Outlet Center to Chelsea Property Group, the owner of 53 other outlet malls nationwide, in November 2002. Chelsea Property Group was acquired by Simon Property Group in June 2004, and the Johnson Creek Outlet Center became part of Simon's Premium Outlets division. With the sale, the mall was rebranded as Johnson Creek Premium Outlets.
