= Sawgrass Mills =

Shopping mall in Broward County, Florida, U.S.

- Interior view (June 2016)
- Location: Sunrise, Florida, U.S.
- Coordinates: 26.151353°N 80.320778°W
- Address: 12801 W. Sunrise Blvd, 33323 (main mall); 2614 and 1800 Sawgrass Mills Circle (The Oasis and Colonnade Outlets)
- Opened: October 4, 1990; 36 years ago (main mall); April 15, 1999; 27 years ago (The Oasis); March 2006; 20 years ago (Colonnade Outlets)
- Renovated: March 2004; June–December 2016; 2019–2023
- Developer: Western Development Corporation; KanAm Group
- Manager: Simon Premium Outlets; The Mills: A Simon Company
- Owner: Simon Property Group
- Architect: Arquitectonica (main mall); Imagineity: Art in Architecture (The Oasis); BCT Design Group (Colonnade Outlets); Craven Thompson & Associates, Inc.
- Num. of stores: 400+ (at peak)
- Num. of anchor tenants: 30 (at peak)
- Floor area: 2,370,610 square feet (220,000 m^{2}) ranked 12th
- Floors: 1 (2 in BrandsMart USA, former Matchbox, and former Hard Rock Cafe (Note: The tenants that replaced HRC do not have two floors anymore.))
- Parking: Parking lot with free spaces; Seven-story parking garage
- Website: www.simon.com/mall/sawgrass-mills
- Building details
- The Colonnade Outlets and parking lot at sunset (February 2022)

General information
- Status: Operational
- Named for: The Everglades
- Construction started: 1988; 38 years ago
- Completed: 1989

Design and construction
- Main contractor: Whiting-Turner Contracting Company

Renovating team
- Architects: Birdair, Inc.; D'Agostino Izzo Quirk Architects, Inc. (D'AIQ); RSM Design
- Renovating firm: The Mills Corporation (The Oasis, Colonnade Outlets, March 2004); Simon Property Group (June–December 2016, 2019–2023)
- Main contractor: Hawkins Construction

Sawgrass Mills is a super-regional outlet mall in Sunrise, Florida, located next to the Amerant Bank Arena. Owned and managed by Simon Property Group, the mall encompasses 2,370,610 square feet (220,237 m^{2}) of retail, dining, and entertainment space.

It is one of the largest shopping centers in the Miami/Fort Lauderdale metropolitan area, being ranked as the 12th largest shopping mall in the United States. (Note: It is ranked as the 12th on Wikipedia. However, the ratings may vary on other sources. The source for the main contractor claims that it is ranked 11th. Some other sources rank it as the 10th. The difference in ratings is if the "largest" refers to total square footage or the amount of gross leasable area.)

The mall was primarily developed by Western Development Corporation (which completed a corporate spin-off as the Mills Corporation in April 1994). Subsequent expansions added The Oasis at Sawgrass Mills and The Colonnade Outlets at Sawgrass Mills, which both serve as open-air extensions of the main mall.

== Overview ==
Designed in the shape of an alligator, Sawgrass Mills opened in October 1990 as the third Landmark Mills mall (and flagship) developed by Western Development Corporation. The mall has been expanded multiple times since then. There are over 400 retail outlets and name brand discounters, and a hotel operated by AC Hotels by Marriott located on-property.

Because of its size, Sawgrass Mills is divided into three parts: the main mall, The Oasis, and The Colonnade Outlets; the latter two are outdoor segments connected to the mall, with The Oasis also serving as Entry 3. It is named after saw grass, Cladium mariscus subsp. jamaicense, a very common plant in the Everglades. The mall's west Broward location was part of the Everglades before human development and is less than a mile from the Everglades (just beyond the nearby Sawgrass Expressway/State Road 869). It is the only Landmark Mills mall to not have its themed concourses be called "neighborhoods", but rather "Main Streets" when it was first launched, and subsequently "Avenues" until the mall was renovated in between 2019 and 2023.

== History ==
=== 1988–1990: Planning and construction ===
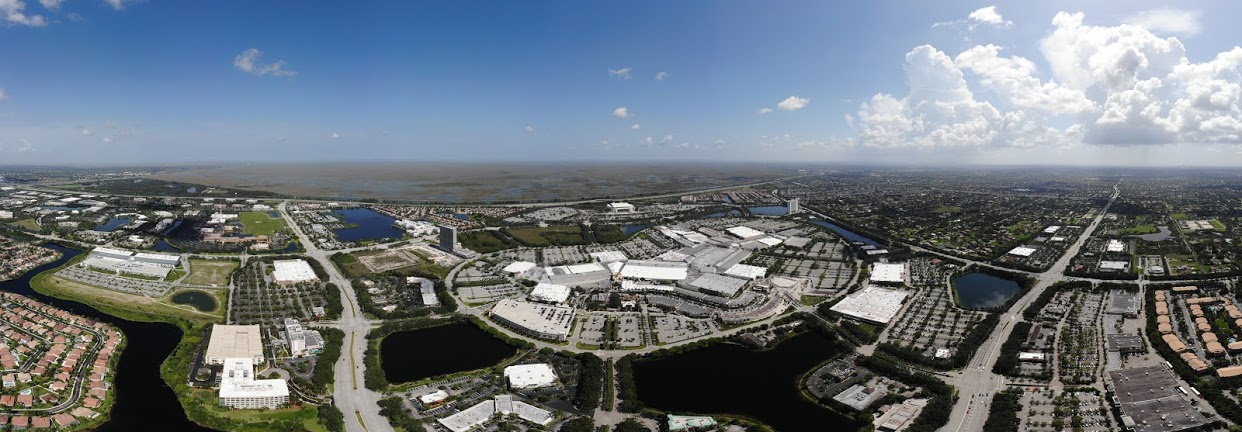
Panoramic photograph of the Sawgrass Mills complex taken on July 7, 2018.

In 1988, the Washington, D.C.-based Western Development Corporation, led by Herbert S. Miller, announced that they would develop a shopping center in South Florida. This would be their third Landmark Mills mall, after Potomac Mills opening in September 1985, and Franklin Mills in May 1989. It would be built on a 442-acre (179 ha) parcel of land in Sunrise, just outside Fort Lauderdale. Previously, the land and surrounding area was composed of swamps and rural areas, once connected to the nearby Everglades. The mall would have seven anchors and over 200 outlet stores. On April 21, 1988, Western announced that three anchors were officially moving into the mall: Sears, Waccamaw Pottery, and a European grocery store. The grocery store would be removed as a planned anchor. An IKEA would also be in the plans; however, an agreement was never reached between them and Western.

On May 24, 1988, the Miami-based architectural firm Arquitectonica would unveil design plans for Sawgrass Mills. The plans included entrance designs and the mall's exterior, and its three-quarters-of-a-mile-long length, though no information on the interior would be revealed yet. Construction would officially begin that month. The mall was developed as a joint venture with the German-based KanAm Group, an investment firm that frequently partnered with Western and Mills. In April 1989, the mall announced that BrandsMart USA would become another anchor tenant. The 49th Street Galleria, an amusement center with bowling, arcade games, roller skating, and restaurants, would also be a planned anchor. It would be the second location after opening in Franklin Mills the same year. The landscape architects for the project were Craven Thompson & Associates, Inc.

In May 1990, a few months before the mall's opening, two more anchors would officially be part of the mall: Phar-Mor and the 49th Street Galleria. On May 21, 1990, Robert Hottinger, a construction worker installing drywall, fell from a scaffold at the mall, passing away four days later. Later, VF Factory Outlet, Inc. would become the last official anchor. In July 1990, marketing and advertising for the new mall would begin appearing across the region, including airplane banners, newspaper ads, and television and radio commercials, leading up to its opening in three months. Media previews would also be held. On August 20, 1990, Waccamaw opened its store more than a month before Sawgrass Mills opened. This would be due to confusion with another anchor, Sears, supposedly opening the weekend prior, inspiring Waccamaw to open as well. Sears Outlet would officially open on September 5, 1990.

=== 1990–2001: Grand opening and The Oasis ===
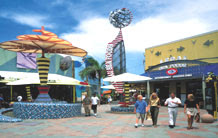
The Oasis Entry 3 (March 2000)

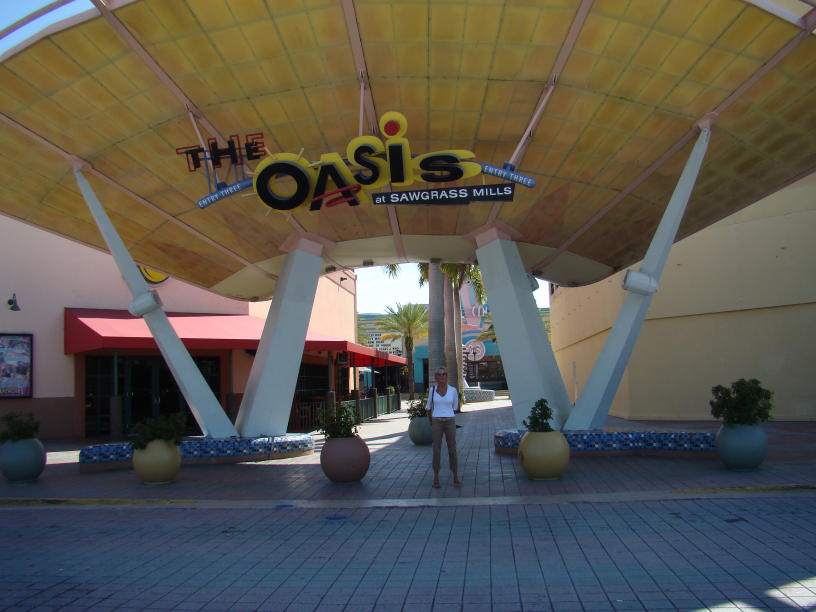
Entrance to The Oasis (December 2008)

After two years of construction, Sawgrass Mills celebrated its grand opening on October 4, 1990 at 9 a.m. EDT, with a parade led by Apollo 12 astronaut Pete Conrad (the third man to walk on the moon) and a jazz performance by Dizzy Gillespie. The mall opened in two stages.

Original tenants included the BrandsMart USA/Sears Outlet wing at the eastern end, extending past the Garden Food Court (next to Sears, previously the Hurricane Food Court), to the Books-A-Million store at the western end of the mall. The second stage, which opened November 15, 1990, extended the mall westward of the Books-A-Million store, past a second food court, the Market Food Court (next to Dick's Sporting Goods, previously the Sports Food Court) to new Marshalls and Spiegel Outlets. Cobb Theatres built an 18-screen cinema located at the Northeast corner of the mall, opening in December 1991, being disconnected from the main mall. Target Greatland was added to the east wing of the mall, opening in July 1992.

Phar-Mor was another early anchor to the mall. Sam's Club, Walmart's warehouse store division, opened outside of the mall to customers in 1993, alongside Kmart, which opened a 109,000 sq ft (10,100 m^{2}) Pace Membership Warehouse, which was eventually converted into another Sam's Club after Walmart acquired Pace.

==== Design and architecture ====
Originally, the concourses were named and themed, and each turn was considered a "Court" and named for the architectural style it featured. The original mall concourses (running west to east) were Modern Main Street, Mediterranean Main Street, Art Deco Main Street, and Caribbean Main Street. The courts were (running west to east) Entertainment Court, Cabana Court, Video Court, Rotunda Court, and New Ideas Court. Mall entrances were named after the entrance roads leading up to them, which included Yellow Toucan, Green Toad, Purple Parrot, White Seahorse, Red Snapper, Blue Dolphin, and Pink Flamingo.

In April 1994, Sears Outlet closed permanently after four years in operation. It was quickly replaced by JCPenney Catalog Outlet (later JCPenney Outlet Store). Then-General Manager Dan Cetina announced in the Sun Sentinel that TJ Maxx would open at Sawgrass Mills in June of that year. Loehmann's would take over the former Saks Fifth Avenue space, as Saks relocated to a larger space within the mall. Service Merchandise would develop a 55,000 sq ft (5,100 m^{2}) store near Burlington Coat Factory, with an expected completion by the end of 1994. Chicago-based Discovery Zone was also interested in establishing a children's play area at Sawgrass Mills. Both Service Merchandise and TJ Maxx anchored a Phase II addition, known as "Veranda Main Street" (Avenue Two, now The Loop), opened November 14, 1995. It ran parallel to the middle mall corridor (Avenue Three, now also The Loop). Local retailer L. Luria & Sons was slated to open an anchor at Sawgrass Mills. A lawsuit ensued, however, when Service Merchandise opened instead, and Luria's blamed the Mills Corporation for choosing Service Merchandise instead.

By mid-June 1996, Sawgrass Mills featured the Warner Bros. Studio Store. Rainforest Cafe opened on November 20, 1996, in the Cabana Court. In June 1997, Cobb Theatres would be acquired by Regal Cinemas for $200 million, and as a result, the Sawgrass Mills movie theater was rebranded as Regal Sawgrass 18 in September 1997. In October through December 1998, Hard Rock Cafe agreed with the Mills Corporation to open a 10,000 sq ft (930 m^{2}) restaurant with two floors at Sawgrass Mills as its fourth location in Florida, as Mills planned to develop an outdoor entertainment center at Entry 3 of Sawgrass Mills, called The Oasis at Sawgrass Mills. It was designed by Imagineity (formerly known as Art in Architecture), and had its grand opening on April 15, 1999, originally featuring Jillian's Entertainment, Ron Jon Surf Shop, and Foot Locker Outlet. This became the mall's first outdoor concourse, bringing it out from near Burlington Coat Factory to Regal Cinemas, which was expanded to 23 screens.

GameWorks, a gaming-based entertainment center, opened at The Oasis in mid-May 1999. Hard Rock Cafe would be adjacent to GameWorks, and had its grand opening on July 7 of that year. The WB Studio Store closed permanently in December 2001 as a result of the AOL-Time Warner merger.

=== 2000–2009: The Colonnade Outlets and Simon Property Group ===
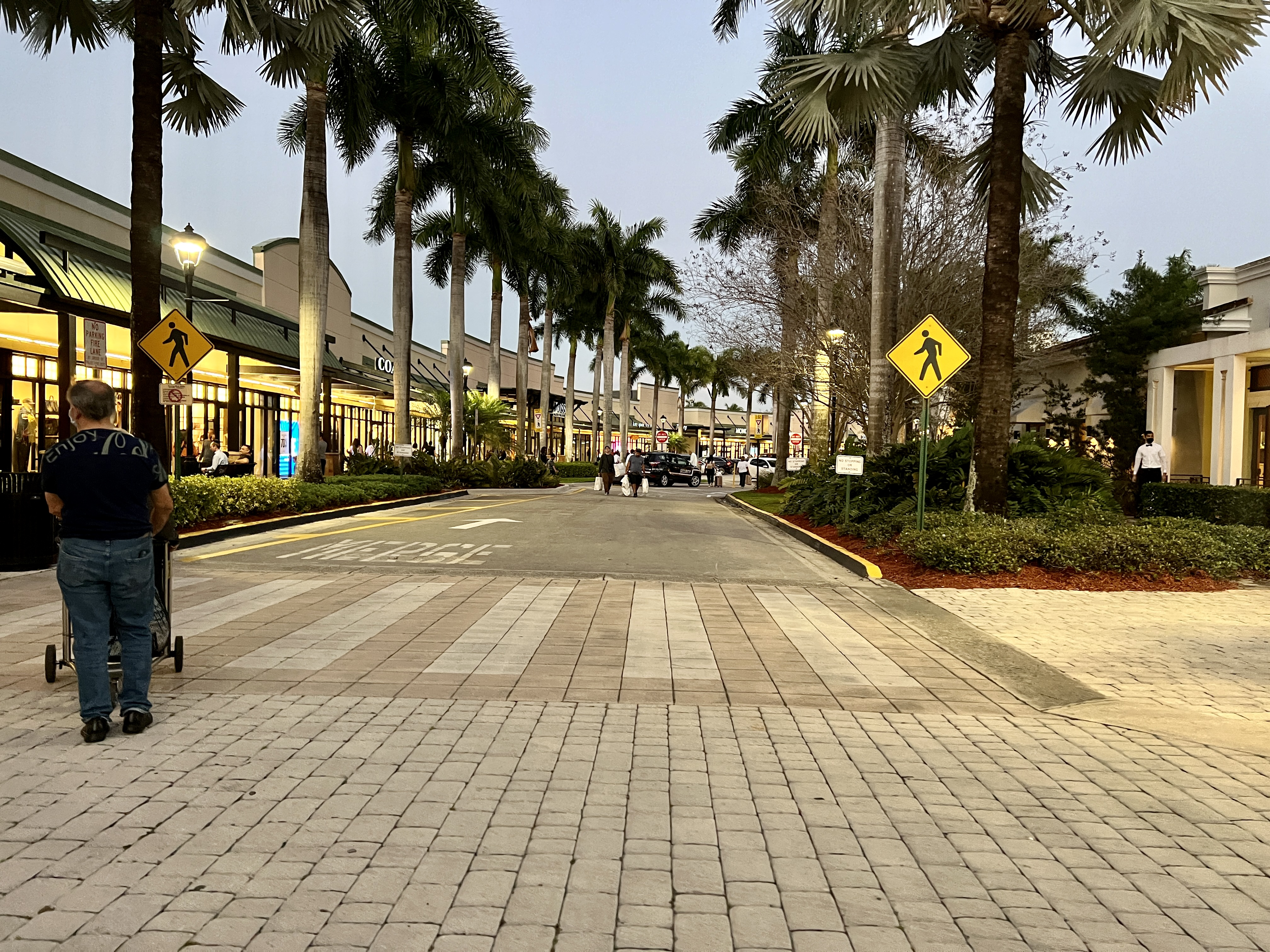
The Colonnade Outlets at sunset (February 2022)

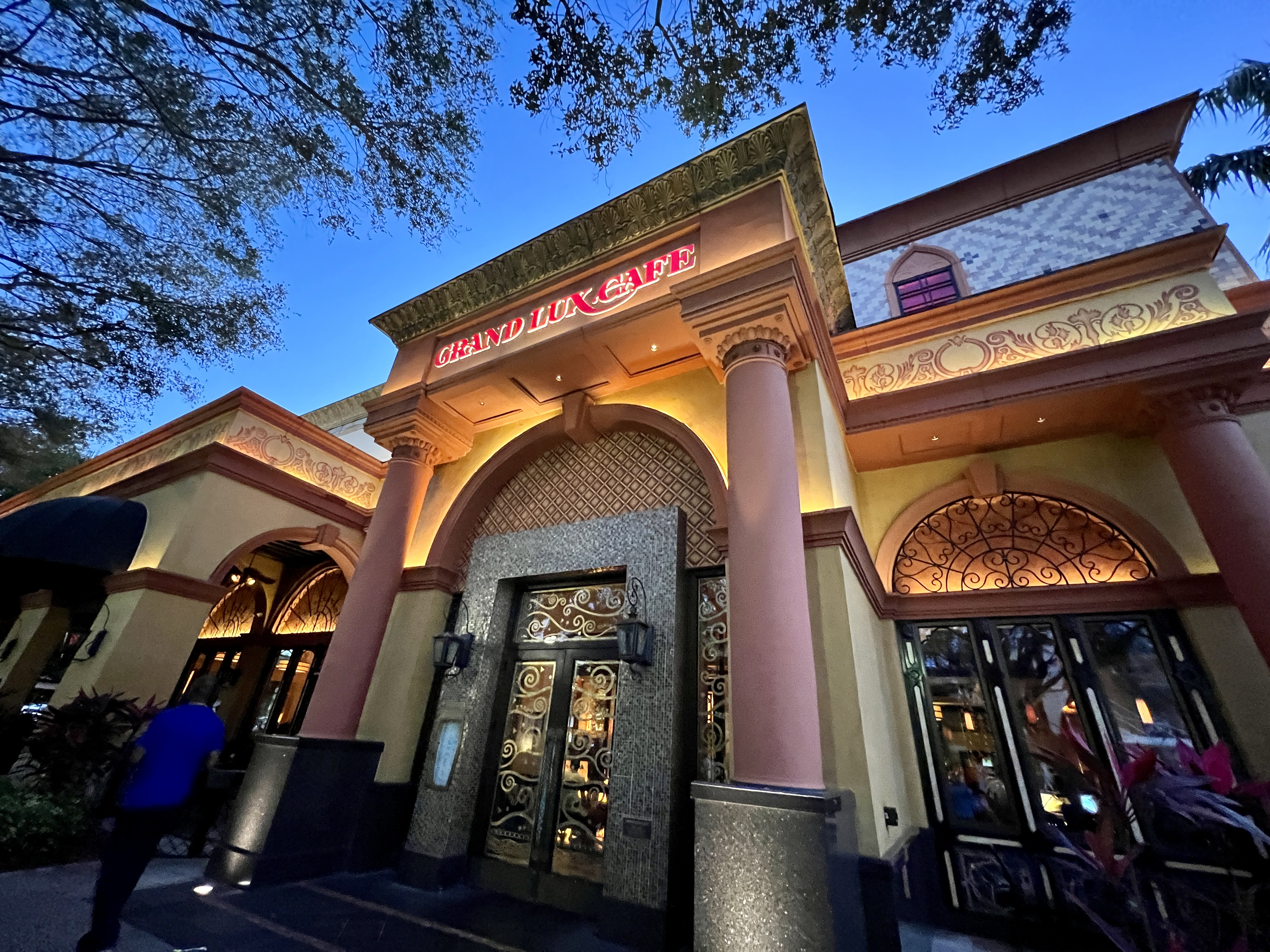
Grand Lux Cafe at The Colonnade Outlets at night (February 2022)

The Cheesecake Factory and Off Broadway Shoe Warehouse opened at The Oasis in March 2000 and 2003, respectively. Nordstrom Rack opened in the fall of that year at The Oasis.

Hard Rock Cafe closed permanently on May 9, 2004 to open a new, flagship two-story cafe at the newly-developed Seminole Hard Rock Hotel & Casino Hollywood, which had its grand opening two days later. Wannado City opened in the spring of 2004. It was an indoor amusement center for kids who were able to work real-world jobs in a miniature city. Later, The Colonnade Outlets at Sawgrass Mills, designed by the Baltimore, Maryland-based BCT Design Group, opened in March 2006. That same month, the mall's Target Greatland was rebranded as SuperTarget. The Colonnade Outlets is an outdoor outlet shopping plaza that featured outlets of more upscale brands, including St. John, Burberry, Coach, Michael Kors, Ralph Lauren, Kate Spade, and Tommy Bahama and restaurants such as Grand Lux Cafe, P. F. Chang's China Bistro, Villagio, and Zinburger. Nike Factory Store opened on May 31, 2006.

In March 2004, Sawgrass Mills began renovating the main mall building's interior. This included new flooring, lighting, repaints, and furniture. Navigation would be updated in the form of "color-coded neighborhoods"; this would later result in the concourses being numbered and renamed "Avenues" instead of Main Streets. Mall entrances also became numbered to represent which Avenue the entrance would lead to (i.e. Entry 4 leading to Avenue Four). The "Courts" were removed from the directory with this change. The animatronic pond in front of Rainforest Cafe was also converted into Cha Cha's Adventure Area, a kids' playground. In May 2006, The Mills Corporation was being investigated by the Securities and Exchange Commission (SEC) due to extensive accounting irregularities and fraudulent financial reporting. As a result, in February 2007, The Mills Corp.'s portfolio, including Sawgrass Mills, would be acquired by Simon Property Group and Farallon Capital Management for $1.64 billion, following the rejection of Brookfield Asset Management's offer in January of that year, which offered to acquire the Mills Corp. for $1.35 billion. The acquisition was completed in April 2007, and the Mills Corporation was rebranded as The Mills: A Simon Company. The Colonnade Outlets received its first expansion in June 2009, featuring Tory Burch, John Varvartos, Giorgio Armani, Versace, Ted Baker.

=== 2010–2018: Gator Garden and Town Center ===
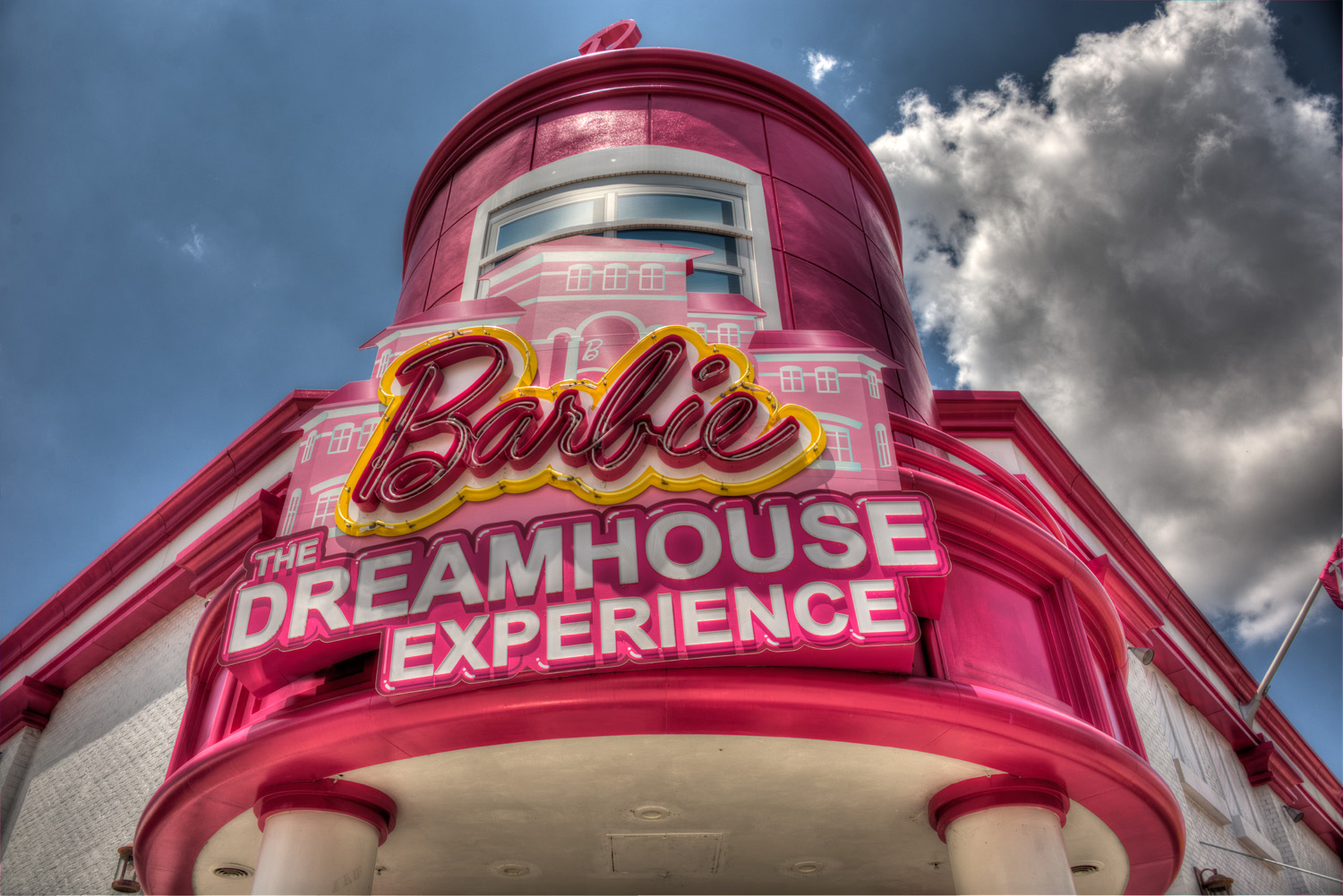
Exterior of Barbie Dreamhouse Experience (April 2014)

In June 2010, Sawgrass Mills launched the "Gator Glam" project, a juried art exhibition featuring 7-foot (84 in)-tall, customized, and painted alligator statues to celebrate the mall's 20th anniversary. These statues were installed in the Colonnade Outlets area, and local artists were invited to submit designs in June 2010 to be featured by October. Art and Culture Center of Hollywood partnered with the mall to select at least 20 artist-designed, freestanding alligator sculptures. Specific designs included an Everglades-themed alligator, one designed by Alejandro Cuadra named "Fiery Gator", and several others displaying unique artwork. The sculptures were primarily placed near the Colonnade Outlets area to enhance the, at the time, new luxury section.

Bloomingdale's - The Outlet Store opened a 25,000 sq ft (2,300 m^{2}) anchor store at Sawgrass Mills on November 17, 2010. The opening took place at 9:30 a.m. EST with live entertainment by Dixieland Band. This was their second outlet location in Florida following Dolphin Mall, which opened one month prior, and their third outlet location overall, with their first one being at Potomac Mills. Wannado City closed permanently on January 12, 2011, after struggling financially. In June 2011, Simon Property Group announced a massive 180,000-square-foot (17,000 m^{2}) expansion and redevelopment project for Sawgrass Mills. This was the mall's first major growth phase in two years, intended to attract high-end retailers. The project included demolition of the former Wannado City building. In October 2011, the mall's JCPenney Outlet Store was announced to be spun-off and rebranded as JC's 5 Star Outlet by its new owner, SB Capital Group, as JCPenney made a strategic plan to exit the outlet business, reorganize operations, and focus on its core department store business, which included selling 15 of its outlet locations to new management led by Glen Gammons.

That month, GameWorks was rebranded as GameRoom Sawgrass (or simply GameRoom), and Johnny Rockets opened there. In March 2012, Simon Property Group acquired full control of the property's management by buying out Farallon's stake in 26 Landmark Mills malls for $1.5 billion. In the spring of 2013, Sawgrass Mills opened a new section, Fashion Row, on the former site of Wannado City, with 140,000 square feet (13,000 m^{2}) of retail space. This redevelopment allowed Forever 21 to move into a massive 60,000 sq ft (5,600 m^{2}) space, and provided a 20,000 sq ft (1,900 m^{2}) location for Calvin Klein. Columbia Sportswear Company was also included in the expansion. In January 2013, the mall's Spec's Music was converted into an FYE (For Your Entertainment).

On May 8, 2013, the Barbie Dreamhouse Experience had its grand opening in the former Hard Rock Cafe space, designed as the second biggest tourist attraction in Florida after Walt Disney World. However, the Barbie Dreamhouse Experience was met with heavy criticism, with locals specifically citing sexism. Despite this, Mattel extended the lease of the Barbie Dreamhouse Experience at Sawgrass Mills in September 2013 to last until the end of August 2015, as a result of the massive number of attendance on its opening day. In contrast, JC's 5 Star Outlet was largely unsuccessful, and in October 2013, the company announced it would close all of its stores, including Sawgrass Mills, by the end of the year. The Barbie Dreamhouse Experience closed its doors at the end of August 2015, leaving the former Hard Rock Cafe space abandoned for another two years. In May 2016, Sports Authority announced that it would also close all of its stores—including Sawgrass Mills—after filing for Chapter 7 bankruptcy, which was previously Chapter 11. Liquidation sales were visible at this time. A renovation for The Oasis was announced in June 2016, with an expected completion of December 2016. The architects of the renovation, D'Agostino Izzo Quirk of Somerville, Massachusetts and Birdair, explained that for shade, canopy structures would be added, and the directory would be updated.

A new parking garage opened next to the Colonnade Outlets in September 2016, which itself received an expansion at the same time, featuring new stores including Tory Burch, John Varvartos, Giorgio Armani, Versace, and Ted Baker. The expansion also opened a new restaurant, Matchbox. GameRoom was sold to Family Entertainment Group (FEG) and rebranded once more as In the Game Sawgrass Mills (stylized In The Game). Century 21 Department Store opened in December 2016, which removed Cha Cha's Adventure Area due to the store needing to expand. Texas de Brazil opened on March 13, 2017 in the former Barbie Dreamhouse Experience space, with the Sawgrass Mills location being their 50th restaurant. In June 2017, Dick's Sporting Goods would move into the former Sports Authority anchor space. In October 2017, Yard House announced an opening at The Oasis. H&M opened a 40,000 sq ft (3,700 m^{2}) flagship-style store on November 16, 2017, taking over space formerly held by TJ Maxx, which moved to a larger 54,000 sq ft (5,000 m^{2}) site. An expansion opened in late 2018 called the "Town Center at Sawgrass Mills", which featured 25 full-price retailers, four new sit down restaurants, and another new parking garage for 2,000 vehicles. The new expansion is located next to the Colonnade Outlets and extends the stores.

=== 2019–present ===
In February 2019, Sawgrass Mills began a multi-million dollar expansion and renovation, with a plan to celebrate its 30th anniversary in October 2020. New tenants included the adidas Outlet Store and Sephora. A True Food Kitchen location was scheduled to open at Sawgrass Mills in the spring of 2020. The Levi's Outlet Store was expanded. Continuing through May 2019, remodeling of Sawgrass Mills included the original enclosed portions, such new signage, paint, aesthetics, and furniture, to bring it up-to-date with Simon's other properties. After the completion of the mall's renovations, the concourses and mall entrances were renamed again, this time returning to names instead of numbers, removing the "Avenues" tag. Since then, the mall concourses have been branded as (from west to east) West End, Fashion Row, The Loop, The Oasis, and East Side. The renovations were designed by RSM Design and were largely completed by 2023.

Seasons 52 opened adjacent to Matchbox in April 2019. In August 2019, Barneys New York Warehouse announced that their location would close as part of plan to close 15 locations nationwide after filing for Chapter 11 bankruptcy. Shake Shack opened in a portion of the former Hard Rock Cafe space on December 23, 2019, adjacent to Texas de Brazil. Primark would open in the former JC's 5 Star Outlet space in October 2020. All Simon properties in the U.S., including Sawgrass Mills, closed temporarily on March 19, 2020, due to the COVID-19 pandemic. The mall reopened in late May of that year. On September 10, 2020, it was announced that Century 21 Department Store would be closing all stores, including the Sawgrass Mills location.

AC Hotel Fort Lauderdale Sawgrass Mills/Sunrise opened on March 31, 2021, designed by Stantec and developed by Norwich Partners LLC in partnership with Simon Property Group. On September 15, 2022, it was announced that Bed Bath & Beyond would close 150 stores nationwide as part of a plan to close stores. The former Century 21 was eventually replaced by an Epic Pickleball & Padel Athletic Club. Announced on September 26, 2022, HomeSense would open in August 2023 adjacent to Primark. In September 2024, Simon Property Group partnered with the Florida Panthers to host a naming contest for their new 7-foot-tall alligator statue, celebrating the team's Stanley Cup championship.

In October 2024, Currito Burrito, Sbarro, and Japan Cafe at Sawgrass Mills were shut down temporarily after inspectors discovered food temperature issues and a rodent infestation. Matchbox was ordered to close on June 27, 2025 due to repeated flying insect problems. In mid-October 2025, Skims would open. Forever 21 filed for Chapter 11 bankruptcy, and announced in March 2025 that it would close its location at Sawgrass Mills, alongside other stores in the country. Saks Global also filed for bankruptcy, and as a result, Neiman Marcus Last Call would close its doors at Sawgrass Mills, with liquidation sales starting in February 2026. However, the mall's Saks Off 5th would remain operational. That month, Disney Character Warehouse announced that it would close permanently on April 15, 2026 after refusing to renew its lease.

Matchbox closed permanently on June 29, 2026. In the Game also closed permanently on August 1, 2026.

== Sawgrass Square ==
The Mills Corporation and KanAm Group also developed a power center nearby Sawgrass Mills, known as Sawgrass Square, which opened in 1996 at 12500 W. Sunrise Boulevard with a gross leaseable area of 118,416 square feet (11,001.2 m^{2}). Unlike the main complex, Sawgrass Square is managed by Southeast Centers and features anchors for daily needs, such as Publix Super Markets, Ross Dress For Less, Office Depot, and Dunkin' Donuts.

== Gallery ==
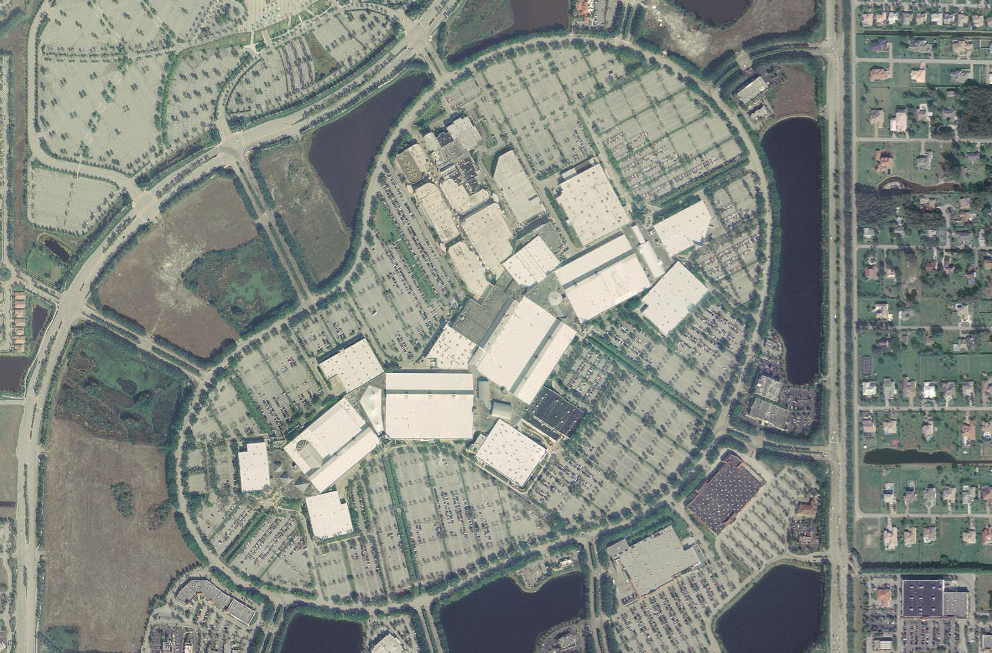
Aerial photo by NASA

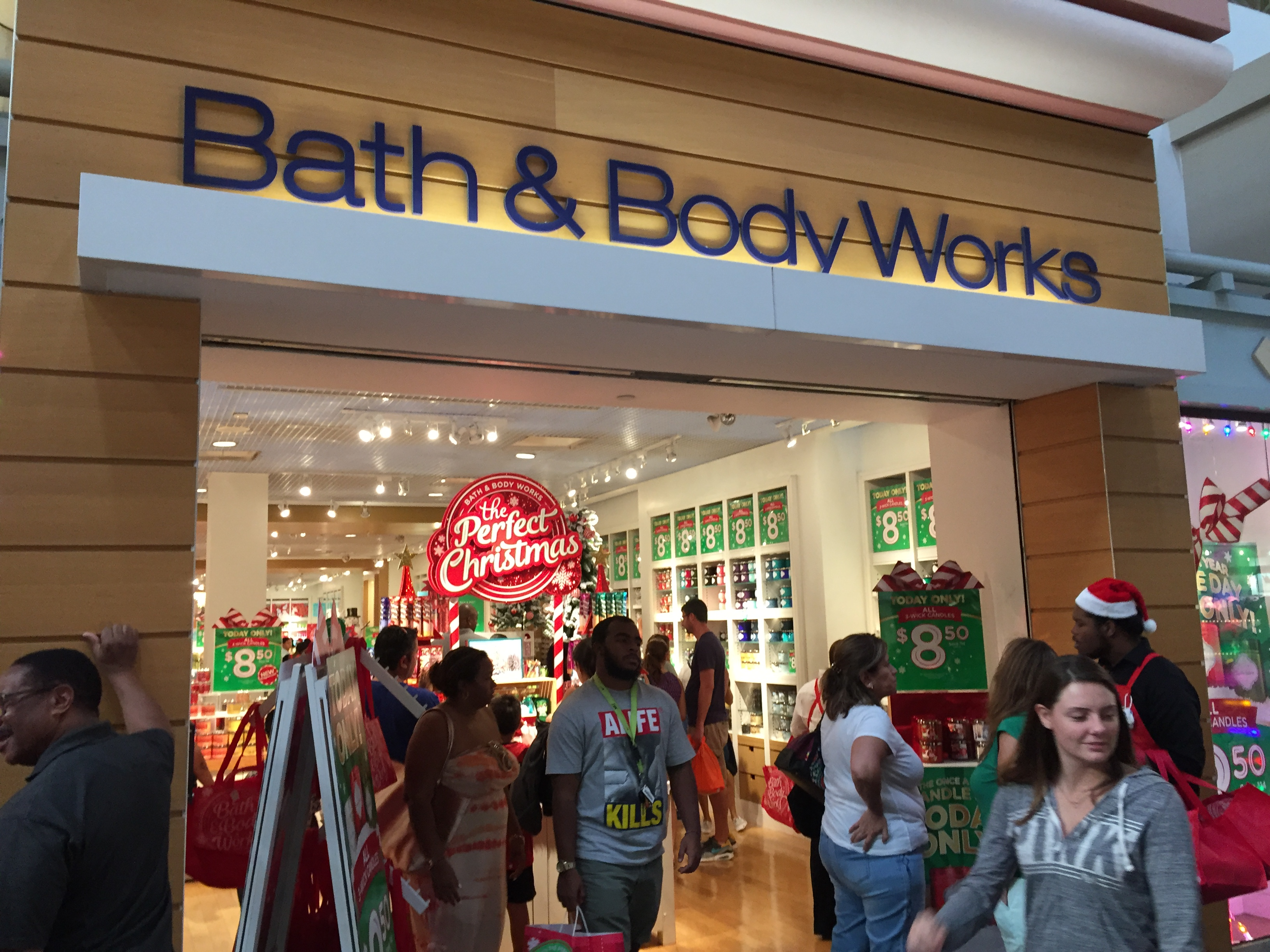
Bath & Body Works (December 2016)

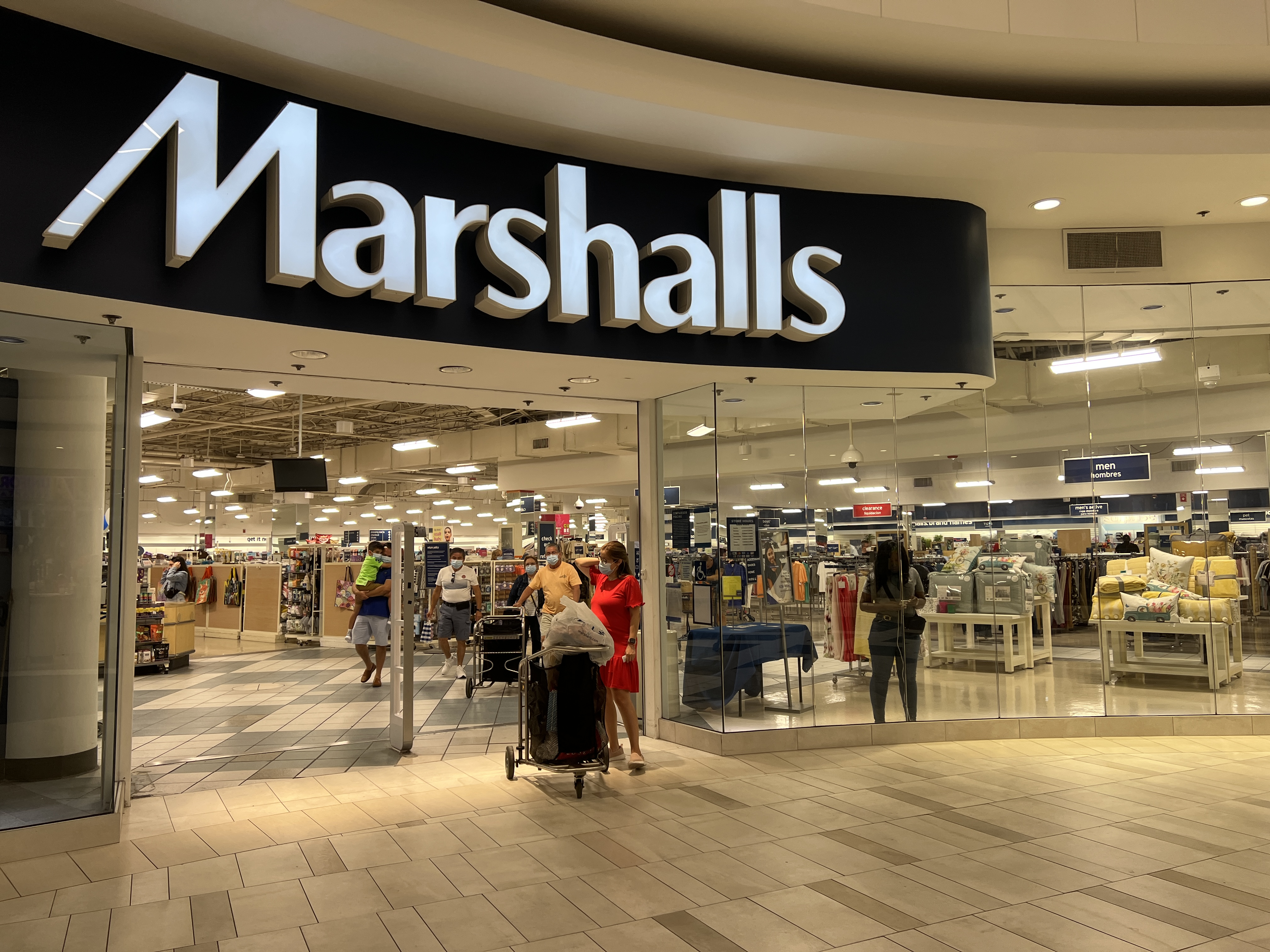
Marshalls (February 2022)

== See also ==
- List of largest shopping malls in the United States
- The Falls (mall) and Tampa Premium Outlets
- Bayside Marketplace
- Arundel Mills
- American Dream (shopping mall)
- Tsawwassen Mills, which was also designed by Stantec
- CrossIron Mills
