= Goodrich-Ramus Barn =

Historic Gothic-arch barn in Eden Prairie, Minnesota, US

Coordinates: 44°49′53″N 93°27′20″W

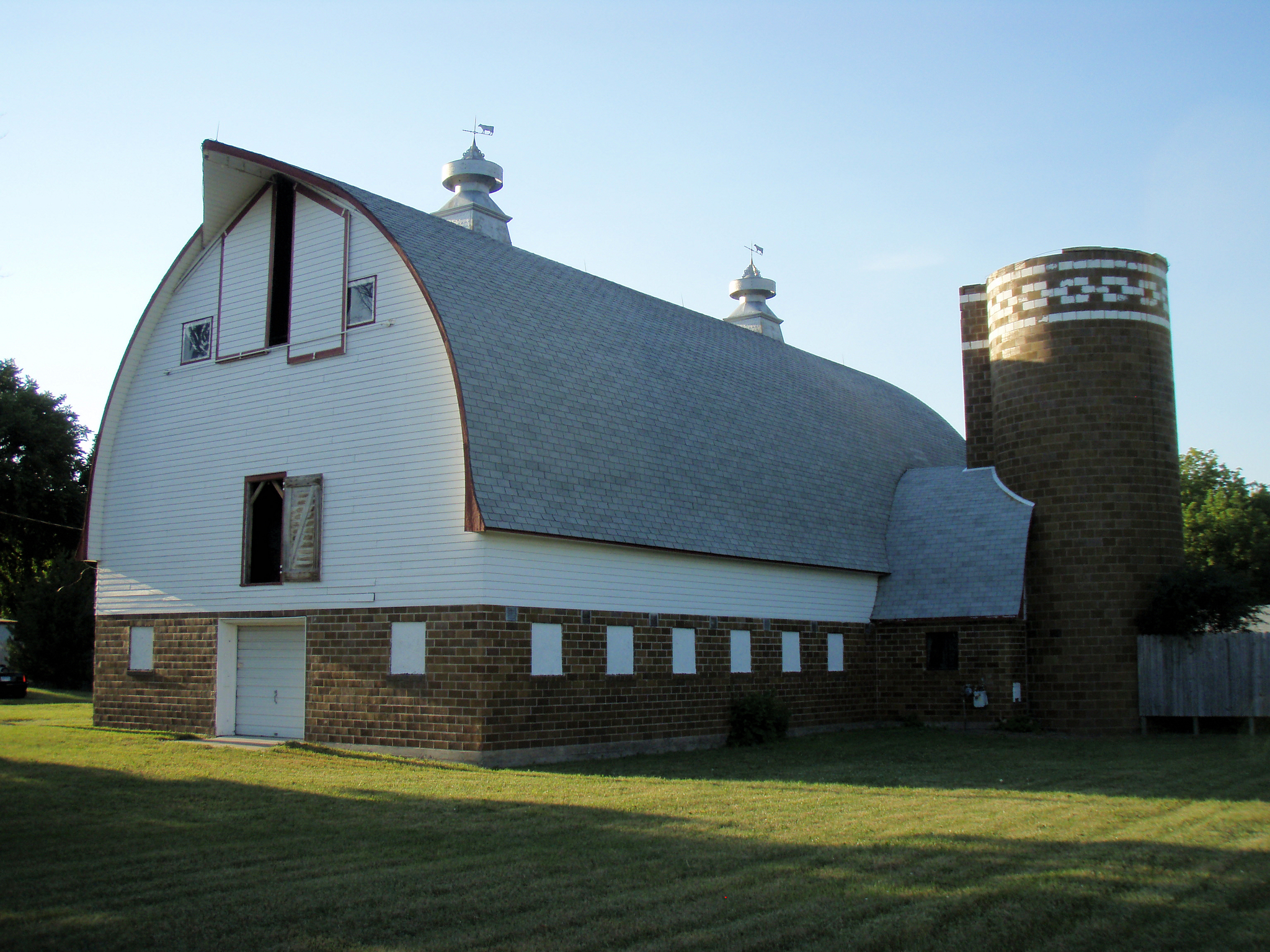
The view of the barn from the Pioneer Trail side

The Goodrich-Ramus Barn is a historic Gothic-arch barn in Eden Prairie, Minnesota. It is considered eligible to be listed on the National Register of Historic Places on the basis of its historical and architectural significance.

== Construction ==
The barn was built in 1942 from materials made by Rilco Laminated Products, Inc., a wholly owned subsidiary of Rock Island Lumber Company located in Albert Lea, Minnesota. These were affiliates of the Weyerhaeuser syndicate. The company had a number of premanufactured barn patterns available from a catalog. This method of barn construction became popular in the late 1930s. The roof has a Gothic arch shape formed from laminated timber rafters. The glued laminated timber rafters had been developed in Europe and introduced to the United States in 1934. The United States Department of Agriculture issued a technical bulletin in 1939 on the use of these rafters, and Rilco was founded in Saint Paul, Minnesota that same year. Rilco's marketing literature at the time promoted the rafters as being "factory-fabricated and engineered", and the rafters were shipped predrilled and ready for assembly with all hardware included.

Masonry work, such as the foundation brick and the clay tile used in the silo, was provided by the Johnston Brothers Clay Works in Fort Dodge, Iowa.

This barn plan was promoted by the Wisconsin Agricultural Experiment Station. The clay tile used for the silo is unusual, because the United States government considered cement safer than tile. The government eventually paid many farmers to demolish their clay tile silos and replace them with cement, but the owners of this barn refused. Both the clay tile and the main barn components were shipped on the Minneapolis and St. Louis Railway north from Fort Dodge and Albert Lea to the Eden Prairie area.

== Reuse ==
The barn is located just north of Flying Cloud Airport on the north side of Pioneer Trail, also known as Hennepin County Road 1. Hennepin County had been proposing to widen Pioneer Trail, and they had been considering demolishing the barn to make way for a stormwater retention basin. The city of Eden Prairie conducted a study to determine if the barn was historic. They determined that the barn has historic value. As a result, the city is now looking for an adaptive reuse proposal.

Robert Vogel of Pathfinder CRM, the company doing the reuse study, said, "All barns are special now, there’s so few of them." John Gertz, preservation planner for the city of Eden Prairie, said, “This particular building is an excellent example of the agricultural buildings that Rilco produced. There’s very little wear on this building. ... It doesn’t look like it was used for very long as a dairy barn.”

Steven Schussler, creator of the Rainforest Cafe restaurants, saw an article about the pending demise of the barn and decided to restore it. The barn became Green Acres Event Center in 2013, used for weddings, corporate events, charity events, and others. Schussler won the 2016 Heritage Preservation Award from the city of Eden Prairie for his restoration of the barn.
