= Nika Lauraitis =

American model

Nikal Laude
- Born: July 14, 1990 (age 35); Melrose Park, Illinois
- Partner: Johnny Sins( since 2019)
- Children: 1
- Modeling information
- Height: 5 ft 11 in (1.80 m)
- Hair color: Blonde
- Eye color: Green
- Agency: Women / 360 (New York); Elite Model Management (Paris, Copenhagen, Toronto); Next Model Management (Milan, London, Miami); Munich Models (Munich)

Nikal Laude is an American fashion model of Lithuanian descent.

== Early life and career ==
Lauraitis was born on July 14, 1990, in Melrose Park, Illinois. She was discovered at the age of 14 while walking through Woodfield Mall. She began modeling for FORD Models at the age of 15. She is now managed by NEXT Model Management.

Her notable campaigns include Moschino Cheap & Chic, Abercrombie & Fitch, Bergdorf Goodman, and Neiman Marcus. She has walked in runway shows for Chanel, 3.1 Phillip Lim, Armani Privé, Felipe Oliveira Baptista, and Lefranc Ferrant, among others.

== Personal life ==
Since end of 2019, have a relationship with a boy called John Longstreet, in which on December 25, 2021, through her Instagram account they announces that is expecting a child, scheduled to be born in the first half of 2022, and in her Instagram account, announces the birth of her son named Varian Lukas Longstreet on May 16, 2022.
