= Great Lakes Crossing Outlets =

Shopping mall in Oakland County, Michigan, U.S.

Coordinates: 42°42′9″N 83°17′57″W

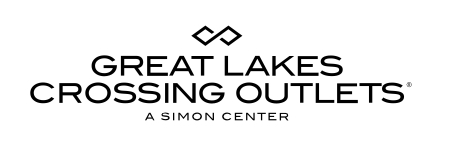

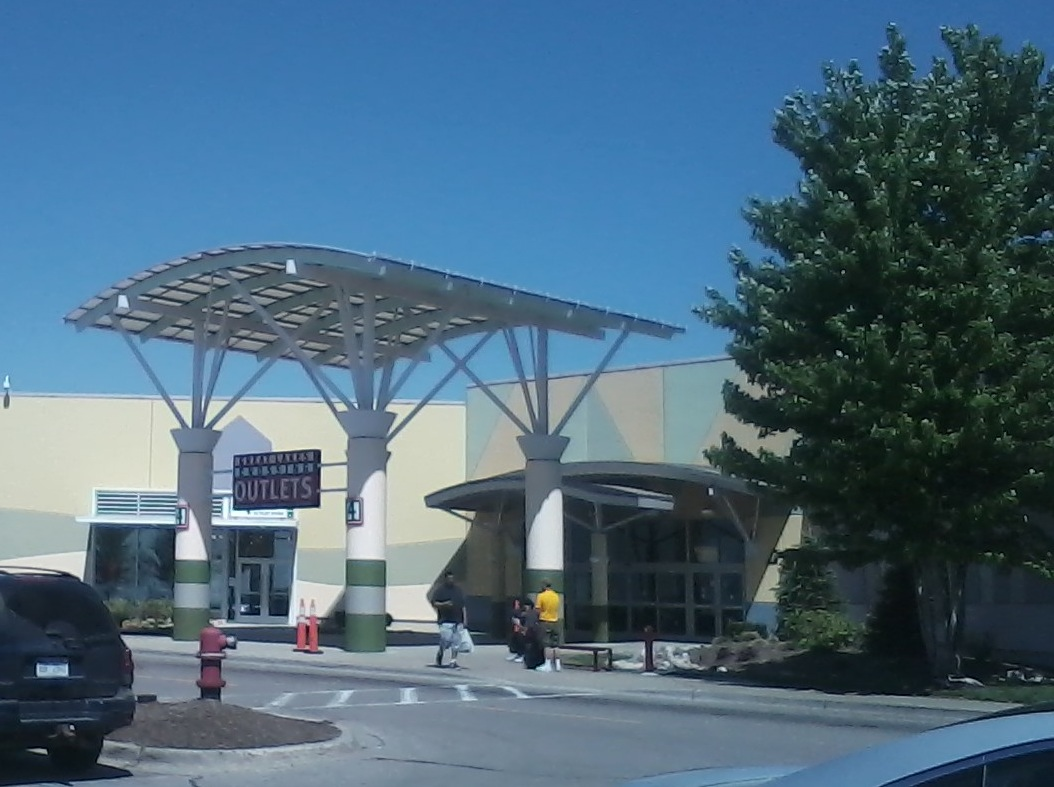
- An entrance on the mall's south side near Marshalls, May 2014
- Location: Auburn Hills, Michigan, U.S.
- Address: 4000 Baldwin Road
- Opened: November 12, 1998; 28 years ago
- Previous names: Auburn Mills (planning); Great Lakes Crossing
- Developer: Western Development Corp. (1990–1992); Taubman Centers (1996–1998)
- Manager: The Mills: A Simon Company
- Owner: Simon Property Group
- Num. of stores: 170+
- Num. of anchor tenants: 9
- Floor area: 1.355 million sq ft (125,900 m^{2})
- Floors: 1
- Public transit: Flint MTA 502; SMART 462
- Website: www.simon.com/mall/great-lakes-crossing-outlets

Great Lakes Crossing Outlets, formerly Great Lakes Crossing, is a shopping mall in Auburn Hills, Michigan, a suburb of Detroit, in the United States. The site of the mall was originally to have been occupied by a different mall called Auburn Mills, which was never built due to financial issues of its intended developer, Western Development Corporation (which spun-off as the Mills Corporation in 1994). Great Lakes Crossing was built on the site and opened in 1998.

Owned and managed by Simon Property Group (which acquired the former original developer, owner and manager Taubman Realty Group/Taubman Centers in November 2025), Great Lakes Crossing Outlets is the largest outlet mall in the state of Michigan. It features 185 stores, with anchor stores including Burlington, Primark, Bass Pro Shops, TJ Maxx, Dick's Sporting Goods, and Marshalls; other notable attractions include a 1,000-seat food court, a 25-screen AMC Star movie theater, Round1 Bowling & Arcade, Legoland Discovery Center, and Sea Life Michigan.

== History ==
=== 1990–1992: Auburn Mills ===
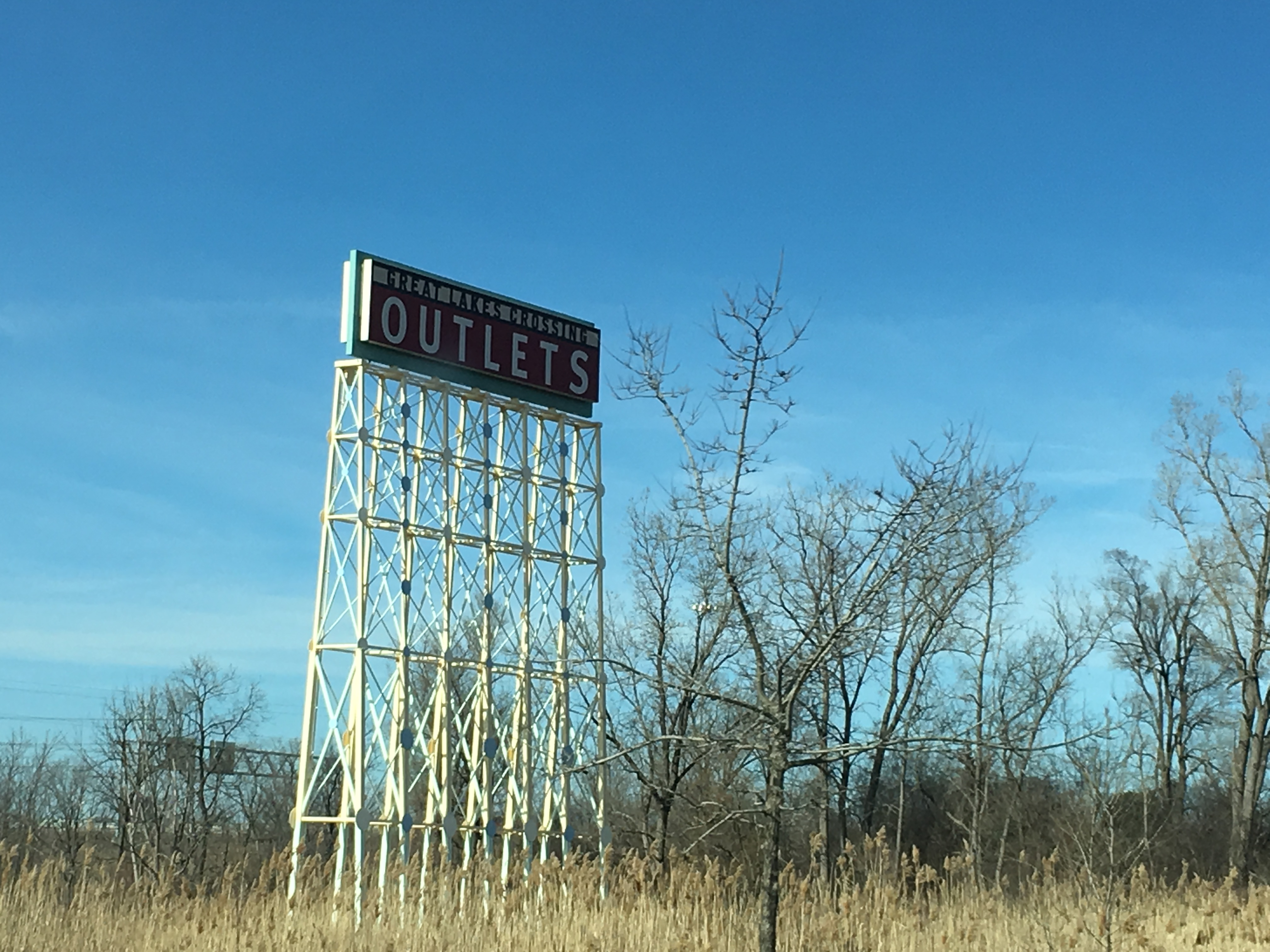
The marquee sign, facing Interstate 75

In the summer of 1990, Western Development Corporation of Washington, D.C. proposed to build a shopping mall called Auburn Mills just south of Interstate 75 between Baldwin and Joslyn roads in the city of Auburn Hills, Michigan. Herbert S. Miller, the then-chairman and CEO of Western Development, announced in a July 1990 interview the mall would have 230 inline stores, comprising both traditional mall tenants and outlet stores. It would also have nine anchor stores including outlet locations of Sears and JCPenney; also included would be Phar-Mor, Bed Bath & Beyond, and Waccamaw Pottery, the latter two of which had no locations in Michigan at the time. Although the proposed Auburn Mills had received conditional approval from state environmental officials, the property was subjected to two lawsuits filed by the city of Lake Angelus, just across Baldwin Road from the proposed mall site, over traffic and environmental changes the mall would cause. Oakland County judge Edward Sosnick ruled in favor of the mall developers in August 1990, after determining the mall would not have significant negative environmental impact.

At this point, Western Development had announced that construction would begin within 30 days, with a projected cost of $200 million and projected completion date of late 1992. Western Development then delayed construction until early 1991 after failing to secure a loan toward construction costs. Further delaying construction of the mall was a threat of foreclosure from the Union Bank of Switzerland, a bank which loaned the money to acquire the land in 1989. Western Development first had to acquire a construction loan before it could begin paying off the mortgage but faced difficulty in doing so due to lenders restricting themselves in the wake of the savings and loan crisis. Western Development agreed to let Union Bank of Switzerland take ownership of the mall property in July 1991, effectively canceling any construction by Western Development. Despite this cancellation, Kmart built a prototype store across Joslyn Road in 1992.

=== Development of Great Lakes Crossing ===
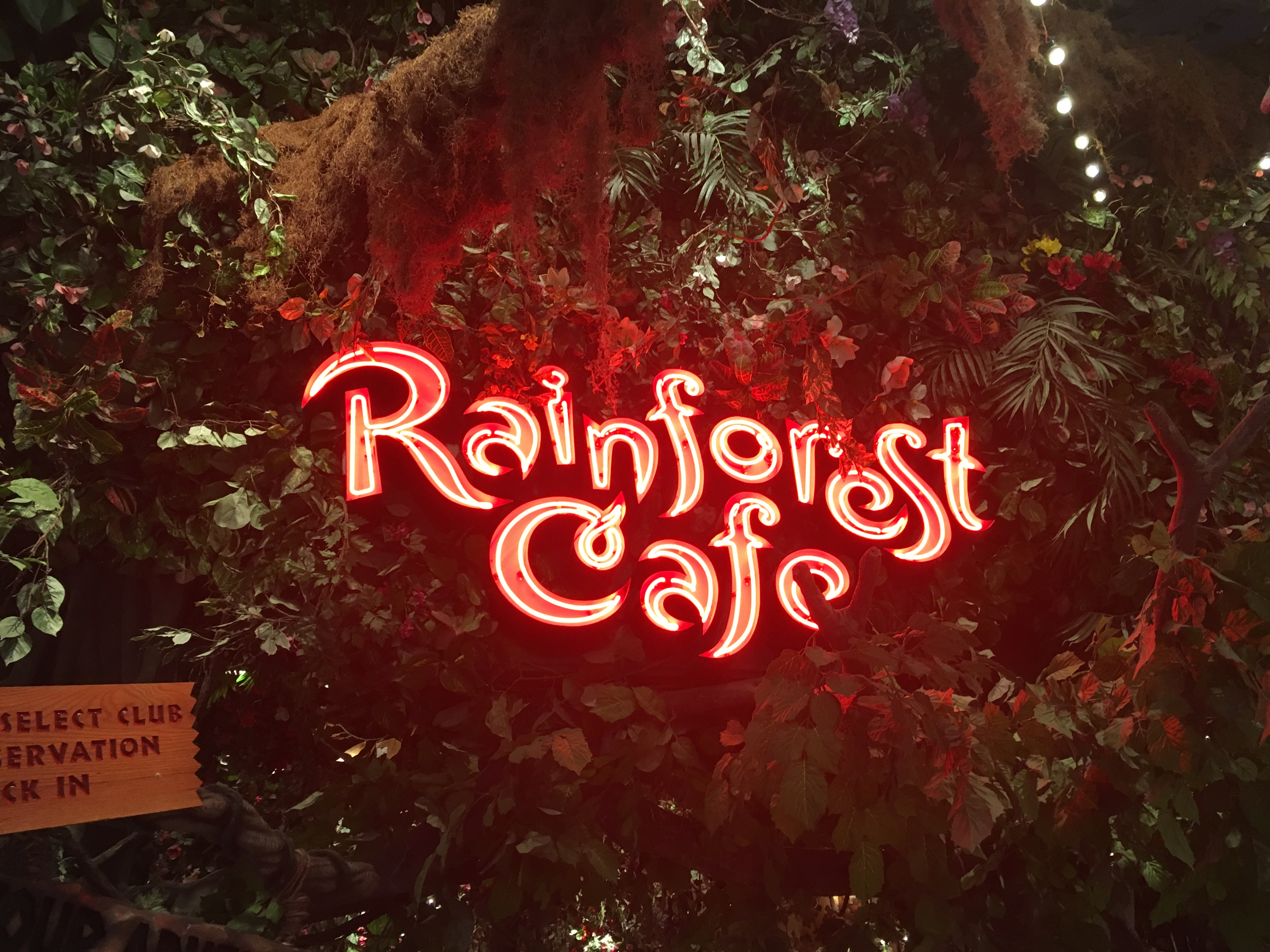
The Rainforest Cafe is one of several restaurants located within the mall.

Taubman Centers made announcements in June 1996 to buy the land from Union Bank and build an outlet mall on the site. Their plans called for a smaller footprint than the originally planned center, so as to lessen the impact on the environment around the property. Taubman Centers had owned the land in the 1980s when it was still zoned residential, but sold it to Western Development in 1989 after that company expressed interest in building a mall. Michael Crosson, a Detroit-based marketing analyst, considered the area to have the most potential for retail growth at the time. In response, Michigan Department of Transportation (MDOT) began expanding Interstate 75's interchange with Baldwin Road. As with Auburn Mills, Taubman's plans for the property called for a large number of anchor stores, along with a mix of outlet stores and traditional mall tenants.

As proposed, the mall would have over 185 tenants situated along an oval-shaped mall corridor, with 1.35 million square feet (125,000 m^{2}) of gross leasable area. It would also be divided into nine different "districts", each with its own décor and tenant mix. Overall, the mall occupied 39 acres (16 ha) of land, with the mall building itself spanning nearly 0.5 miles (0.80 km) from end to end. Taubman had undergone negotiations with a large number of retailers prior to seeking approval from the city of Auburn Hills, including various big-box store as well as various department store chains which also operate outlet locations. Detroit-based retail analyst Fred Marx felt the varied mix of stores would distinguish the mall from competitors such as Prime Outlets (now Birch Run Premium Outlets) in Birch Run, which was then the state's largest outlet mall, without having a negative impact on that mall's business. By September 1997, the proposed mall had been named Great Lakes Crossing.

Taubman had estimated building costs at over $100 million, and predicted nearly 40 percent of sales would come from tourists. Tenants confirmed for the mall by May 1998 included Star Theatres, Rainforest Cafe, GameWorks, Marshalls, TJ Maxx, Bed Bath & Beyond, Finish Line, FYE, and Burlington Coat Factory (now known as Burlington), which would be relocating from an existing store in Bloomfield Hills. Several other confirmed tenants of the mall would also be operating their first Michigan locations at the mall, including Oshman's Sporting Goods, Bass Pro Shops, JCPenney Outlet, and Last Call, the outlet division of Neiman Marcus. Steve & Barry's was also selected as an anchor store; it would be not only their first location in a mall, but also their first in a "superstore" format which expanded their clothing line beyond collegiate apparel to men's and women's casual wear. In addition to these stores, the mall would include a 1,000-seat food court. Three outparcels of the mall would be occupied by Chili's, On the Border Mexican Grill & Cantina, and a Borders bookstore.

=== Opening ===
Great Lakes Crossing opened on November 12, 1998. Taubman predicted the mall would have over 17 million visitors within its first year, and that its location would be convenient for tourists traveling to northern Michigan. Many major tenants were still under development at the time of the mall's grand opening, including Bass Pro Shops, Oshman's, Star Theatres, Stir Crazy, and Wolfgang Puck Cafe. Developers noted the presence of traditional mall stores would impact other malls located on the north side of metro Detroit, such as Oakland Mall and Summit Place Mall. They also noted the mall included several amenities suitable for families and children, including child-accessible restrooms, a children's playplace in the food court, an indoor amusement park called Jeepers!, and The Children's Place. Opening ceremonies lasted for four days and included appearances by Miss Michigan 1998 Laura Welling; performances by the University of Michigan marching band, jugglers, comedians, and magicians; souvenirs for the first 10,000 shoppers; and a prize drawing whose grand prize was a power boat offered by Bass Pro Shops. A directory published in The Detroit News and Free Press just before the mall's opening indicated a large number of stores had opened their first Michigan locations at Great Lakes Crossing, including Charlotte Russe, Ann Taylor Loft, Bebe Stores, The Icing, Rack Room Shoes, GameWorks, and restaurants Ben & Jerry's, Hot Dog on a Stick, Stir Crazy, Alcatraz Brewing Company, and a Dick Clark's American bandstand grill. At opening, 91 percent of the mall's storefronts were leased, and over 54,000 shoppers attended on opening day.

One year after the mall's opening, many individual retailers had expressed concerns that sales had dropped off, despite the mall's then-general manager noting sales were up to expectations; specifically, mall sales were between $300 and $400 per square foot in the mall's first year of business, over the then-national average of $291. The International Council of Shopping Centers reported at the time a decrease in traffic was not unusual for a mall in its first year of business, particularly due to factors such as unusually high expectations from retailers following a grand opening, and shopper unfamiliarity with the mall's mix of tenants. Taubman also noted that, other than a small number of temporary stores that were only open for the Christmas 1998 shopping season, the only stores to close within the first year were clothing store J. Riggings and shoe store The Wild Pair, both due to the bankruptcy of their parent company Edison Brothers Stores in 1999. In addition, the Wolfgang Puck Cafe was never opened due to financial difficulties, so Taubman Centers underwent negotiations to fill the space where it would have opened. Several other stores joined in 1999, including Victoria's Secret, White Barn Candle Company, Limited Too, Forever 21, and Zales Jewelers. Two other strip malls were built across Interstate 75: The Auburn Mile and Baldwin Commons, whose tenants featured such big-box stores as Costco, Kohl's, Meijer, and Target.

=== After opening ===
In 2000, a report filed by the Detroit Metro Convention & Visitors Bureau found the mall was visited less by tourists than other attractions in metropolitan Detroit, including Somerset Collection. A specialist hired by Taubman Centers to manage tourism marketing for the mall theorized this deficiency was due to an overemphasis by mall marketers on tour bus travel, combined with the mall being new enough that out-of-state tourists may not have been aware of its existence yet. Despite this, the mall continued to have significant regional impact. By 2001, vacancy had begun to increase at Summit Place Mall in nearby Waterford Township by more than ten percent since Great Lakes Crossing's opening. JCPenney closed its outlet store at the mall in early 2002. A portion of their former location became a Circuit City which opened in November 2003. Taubman Centers assumed total ownership of the mall in 2003 after buying out a fifteen percent minority stake held by UBS Group AG, successor to Union Bank of Switzerland.

Steve & Barry's relocated to near Summit Place Mall in 2007 and was replaced by an Urban Behavior. H&M opened a 22,000-square-foot (2,000 m^{2}) store at the mall in 2007, as part of an expansion into the state which began with a store at Briarwood Mall in Ann Arbor earlier in the year. Taubman representatives noted the addition of this chain to both Great Lakes Crossing and other malls under its ownership represented a move toward targeting younger shopper demographics. In 2009, tenants that joined the mall included Michael Kors Outlet, Calvin Klein Outlet, Dakota Watch Company, and a Bar Louie which replaced the former Dick Clark's American Bandstand grill. This was followed in February 2010 by a 22,000-square-foot (2,000 m^{2}) Toby Keith's I Love This Bar & Grill, the sixth in a chain of bars founded by singer Toby Keith. GameWorks closed in March 2010 as part of a corporate restructuring.

=== 2010s and 2020s ===
In August 2010, Forever 21 moved from its original smaller location to the former Steve and Barry's/Urban Behavior location, and FYE was also part of Forever 21's expansion and eventually moved to a smaller store. Taubman Centers announced in late 2010 that the mall would be renamed Great Lakes Crossing Outlets, in order to reflect more clearly the presence of outlet stores in the tenant mix. This renaming coincided with several new tenants, including the first Michigan locations of Lord & Taylor Outlet, Hugo Boss Factory Store, and Talbots Outlet. Other new stores at the time included outlet locations of Polo Ralph Lauren, Wilsons Leather Outlet, and aerie. Art Van Furniture also opened a 43,000 square feet (4,000 m^{2}) store at the mall on Black Friday 2010, replacing Circuit City which had gone out of business in 2009. The rebranding was accompanied by a grand reopening ceremony which included free gift cards and tote bags for customers, along with several performances by local musicians and a ribbon-cutting. The rebranding made Great Lakes Crossing the largest outlet mall in the state of Michigan, with over 185 stores. Borders, one of the mall's outparcels, went out of business in 2011; two years later, their location became the first Michigan location for 2nd and Charles, a second-hand bookstore owned by Books-A-Million.

The mall underwent a large number of major store changes throughout the late 2010s and into 2020. In late 2014, Taubman announced the former GameWorks location would be replaced by an aquarium called Sea Life Michigan. Legoland Discovery Center opened at the mall in 2016, taking the place of Jeepers! Sports Authority, which had acquired the Oshman's chain in 2005, closed its store in August 2016 after filing for chapter 11 bankruptcy. Taking its place was the first Michigan location of the Japanese entertainment franchise Round1. Neiman Marcus closed the last of its Last Call outlet stores, including the one at Auburn Hills, on January 15, 2018, due to bankruptcy protection as a result of the retail apocalypse. The store was replaced by a Planet Fitness later in the year. Off 5th closed at the mall in December 2018, and in July 2019, Nordstrom announced it would relocate its Nordstrom Rack outlet store from Baldwin Commons into the former Off 5th location by early 2020.

On March 5, 2020, Art Van announced it would be closing all of its company-owned stores, including its Great Lakes Crossing Outlets location, as it filed for chapter 11 bankruptcy. In May 2020, furniture chain Arhaus confirmed the opening of a clearance center in the space vacated by Lord & Taylor in 2019. As of 2020, the mall contains over 185 stores, and is described by Taubman Centers as "the top tourist shopping destination in Michigan", with over 30 percent of annual sales coming from out-of-state tourists. In October 2022, Bed Bath and Beyond closed its Great Lakes Crossing location. In March 2024, it was announced that Irish fashion store Primark and Dick's Sporting Goods will be added to the mall, replacing the vacated Art Van Furniture and Bed Bath and Beyond respectively. Dick's Sporting Goods eventually opened on August 23, 2024, with Primark opening on September 12 of that same year. In March 2025, Bar Louie closed. Later that year, along with its other locations after filing for bankruptcy, Forever 21 closed its Great Lakes Crossing location. In September 2025, it was announced that Urban Planet will move into the former location vacated by Forever 21, opening on October 17th. In early 2026, it was announced that Grand Rapids based restaurant chain HopCat will open a location in the former location of Bar Louie of summer that year.

==== Shooting incident ====
On July 11, 2026, a shooting occurred near the food court, killing a 20-year-old man and injuring a 19-year-old woman. The incident stemmed from an altercation in the food court bathroom between the 20-year-old man and 22-year-old male shooter. The two men later crossed paths near the food court area, resulting in the attack where shots were fired. The shooter was then taken into custody, after fully cooperating with police. On July 14, 2026, Auburn Hills police announced that the shooter was released from custody.

== See also ==
- Auburn Hills, Michigan
- Metro Detroit
- Tourism in metropolitan Detroit
