= Stir crazy =

Stir-crazy is an alternate idiom for cabin fever, a negative reaction caused by prolonged confinement.

Stir Crazy may also refer to:

- Stir Crazy (film), a 1980 comedy film
- Stir Crazy (restaurant), a US restaurant chain
- Stir Crazy (TV series), a short-lived 1985 CBS sitcom
- "Stir Crazy", a song by the indie rock band Redlight Cinema
- "Stir Crazy", a song by The Madd Rapper, featuring Eminem
