= Nike Vision =

Athletic eyewear company

- Company type: Subsidiary
- Industry: Eyewear
- Headquarters: US
- Products: Sunglasses
- Parent: Nike
- Website: nikevision.com

Nike Vision is a sub-company of the Nike corporation which produces prescription eyewear and sunglasses. However products can no longer be purchased directly through the Nike Vision website. Its site now serves as a showcase for Nike sunglasses and eyeglasses.
