= T-Rex Cafe =

T-Rex Cafe is a themed restaurant located at Disney Springs in Lake Buena Vista, Florida. It is operated by Landry's and was created in collaboration with Steven Schussler. The restaurant features animatronic dinosaurs and has different dining rooms themed around different environments. It opened on October 17, 2008. An earlier location also existed at The Legends at Village West in Kansas City, Kansas, which opened in 2006. However, it was closed in 2017. In March 2014, a fish tank burst at restaurant, flooding the dining room. However, no injuries were reported and the fish were rescued.

== See also ==
- Rainforest Cafe
