= Stir Crazy Thane =

Stir Crazy
- Industry: Restaurants
- Genre: Oriental
- Headquarters: Thane, Maharashtra, India
- Area served: Thane And Mumbai
- Products: Chinese, Japanese, Burmis, Thai, Wok, Salads,
- Owner: Rohit Narang, Sanjeev Kapoor
- Website: www.stircrazy.in

Stir Crazy Thane is an oriental restaurant based in Thane, India at Viviana Mall, founded by hotelier Rohit Narang of Mars Group in collaboration with Master Chef Sanjeev Kapoor.

Apart from the interiors and menu, the USP of the restaurant is their marketplace concept, where they can choose from 140 ingredient options and hand them over to the wok chefs for their mix. The restaurant claims to have no connection with the defunct Stir Crazy chain in the United States.

High-profile figures attending on its first night included Tele Actor Vishal Singh, Actress Shilpa Sakhlani, Director Ankush Mohla, Actress Smita Bansal, and also actress and astrologer Munisha Khatwani.
