= Harmon Corner =

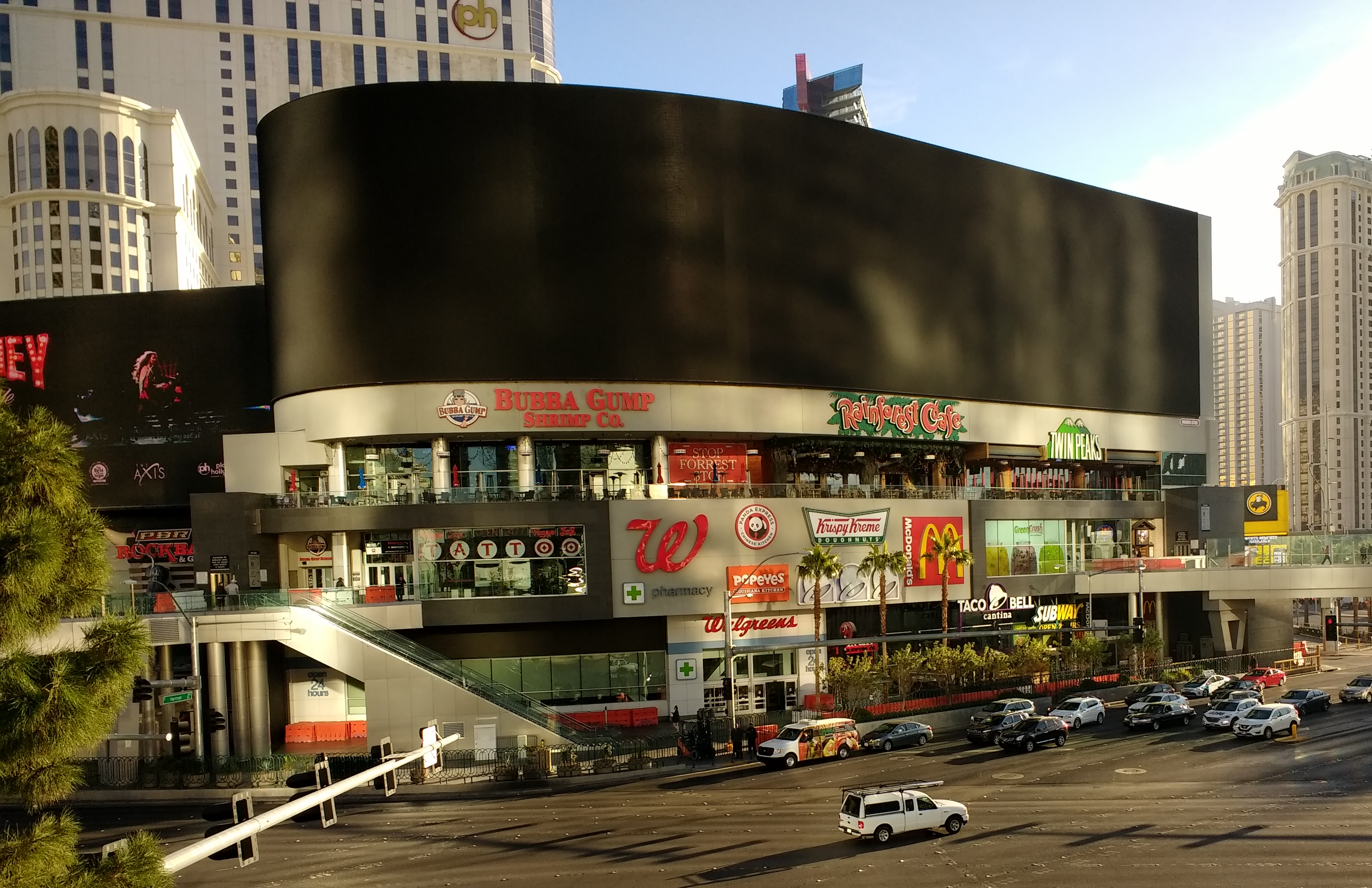
- Location: Paradise, Nevada, United States
- Coordinates: 36°06′32″N 115°10′20″W
- Address: 3717 Las Vegas Boulevard South
- Opened: 2012; 14 years ago
- Developer: BPS Partners
- Architect: SH Architecture
- Floor area: 110,184 square feet (10,236.4 m^{2})
- Floors: 3
- Website: https://harmoncorner.com/

Harmon Corner is an enclosed three-story shopping mall on the Las Vegas Strip in Paradise, Nevada, United States. Construction began in 2011, and the mall opened in 2012. The 110,184-square-foot mall includes various restaurants, and its anchor store is a two-story Walgreens. The mall's signature feature is its LED video billboard screen, measuring 60 feet high and 306 feet wide. It was the world's largest LED screen when it became operational in 2012. The mall achieved a Leadership in Energy and Environmental Design Silver certification in 2013.

== History ==
Harmon Corner is located on the Las Vegas Strip, at the northeast corner of South Las Vegas Boulevard and Harmon Avenue. Development group BPS Partners purchased the vacant 2.17-acre (0.88 ha) property from Clark County, Nevada in February 2010, at a cost of $25 million. The property was chosen because of its proximity to the Planet Hollywood, Cosmopolitan, and CityCenter resorts, in an area where an estimated 80,000 pedestrians pass by each day.

The building was designed by SH Architecture. General contractor Penta Building Group began construction of the three-story Harmon Corner in February 2011. The 110,184 sq ft (10,236.4 m^{2}) enclosed mall was expected to cost $100 million. The 135-foot tall building was expected to be topped out on July 27, 2011.

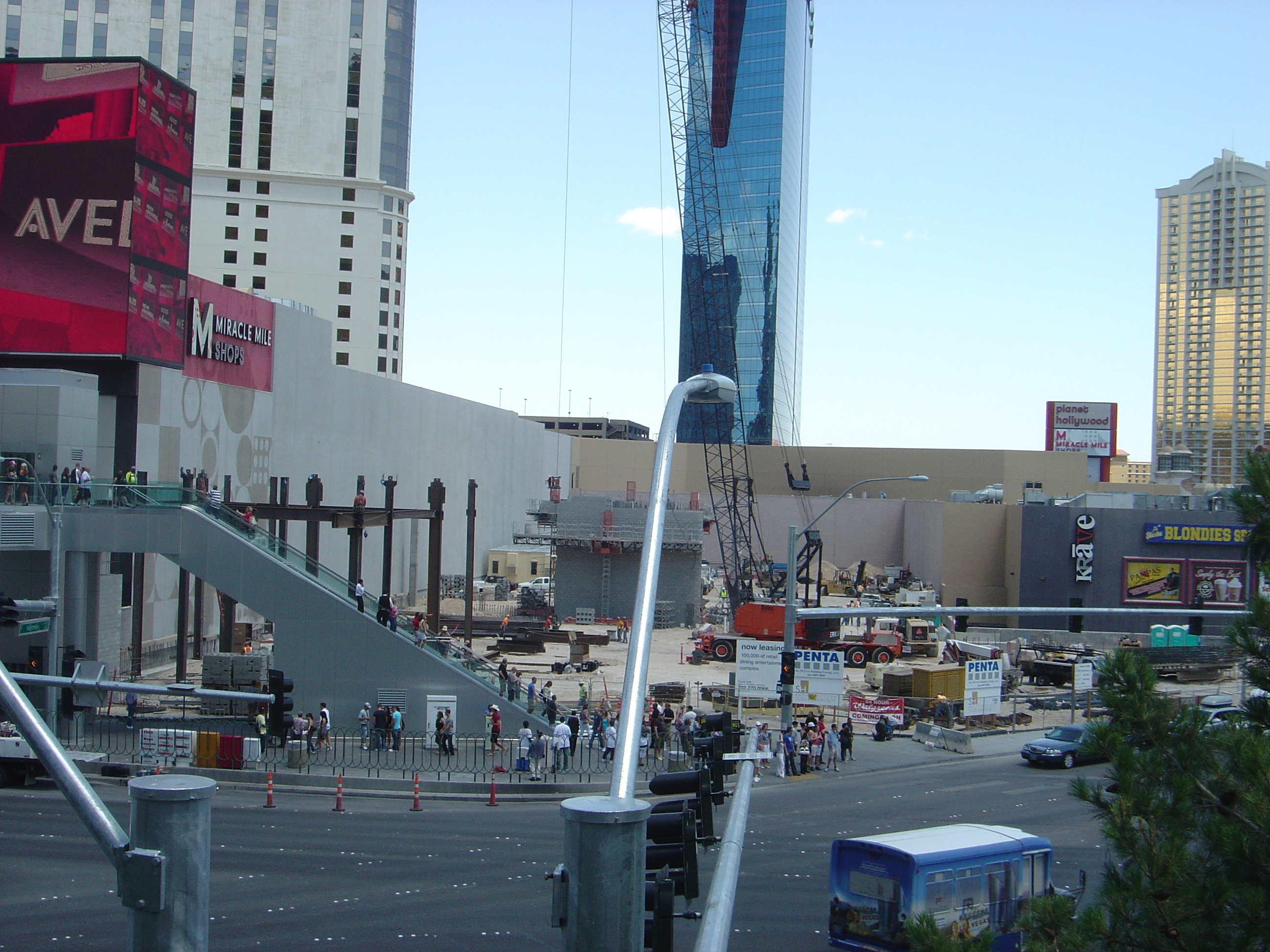
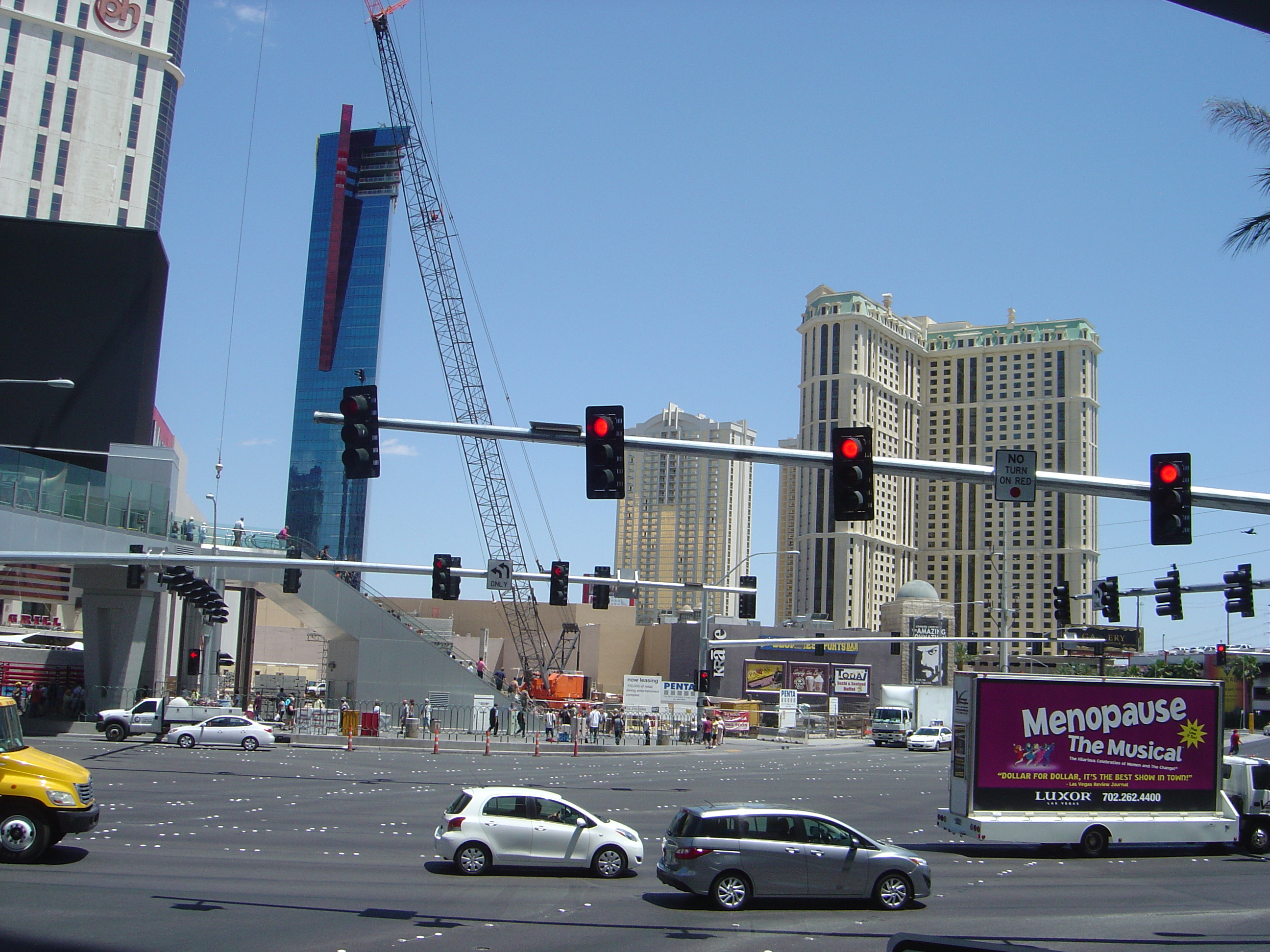
Harmon Corner during construction (May 2011)

Harmon Corner opened in 2012. It was built to be environmentally friendly and energy efficient, and the project included recycled building materials. In 2013, the building was upgraded to achieve a Leadership in Energy and Environmental Design Silver certification from the U.S. Green Building Council.

== Features ==
Harmon Corner opened with a large two-story Walgreens as its anchor store, becoming one of the most profitable Walgreens stores in the United States a few months after opening. The mall also featured a two-story McDonald's, and other restaurants included Panda Express, Bubba Gump Shrimp Company and Twin Peaks. Actor and director Eli Roth opened the $10 million Goretorium, a combination haunted house/nightclub/bar, on the third floor of Harmon Corner in September 2012. It closed one year later because of financial difficulty.

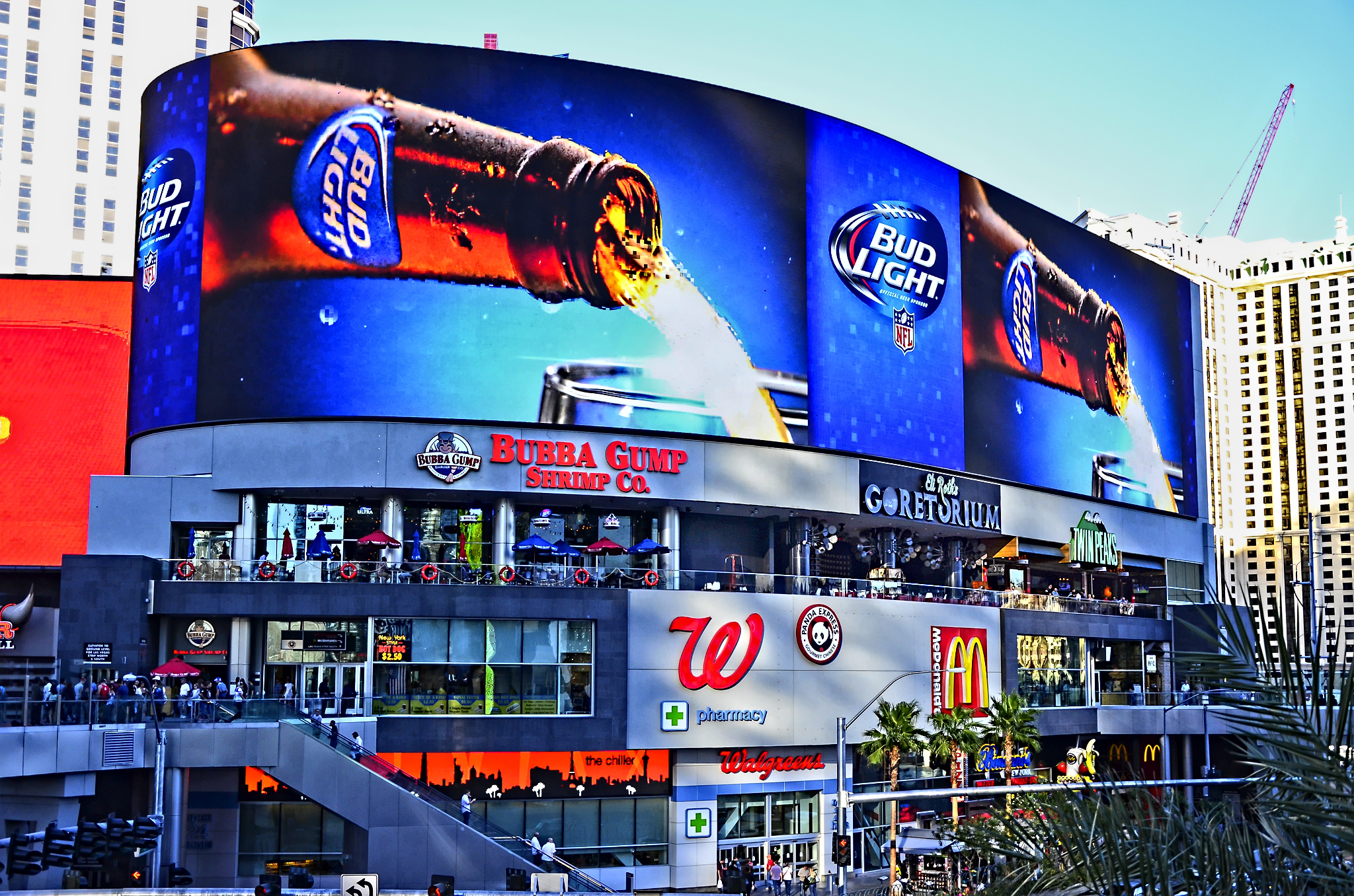
Billboard screen advertising Bud Light

A Rainforest Cafe opened at Harmon Corner in September 2015, after its location in the MGM Grand was closed. In November 2016, Taco Bell opened its fourth Taco Bell Cantina restaurant at Harmon Corner. It was Taco Bell's 7,000th restaurant and its first flagship location. The two-story restaurant offered 24-hour service and included a retail store. Sugar Factory American Brasserie, a three-story candy shop and restaurant, opened in 2021. It took the former space of Twin Peaks.

The Harmon Corner's signature feature is its LED video billboard screen, the largest in the world. The screen became fully operational in early August 2012. The sign measures 60 feet high and 306 feet wide, and is 27 times larger than the average highway billboard. The sign was meant to mimic a similar one located in New York's Times Square.

The screen is serviced by YESCO, which has called it the most difficult sign in Las Vegas to maintain. To access the screen, workers must use an elevator and several ladders before reaching the rooftop and rappelling over the edge.
