= Woodfield Mall =

Shopping mall in Schaumburg, Illinois

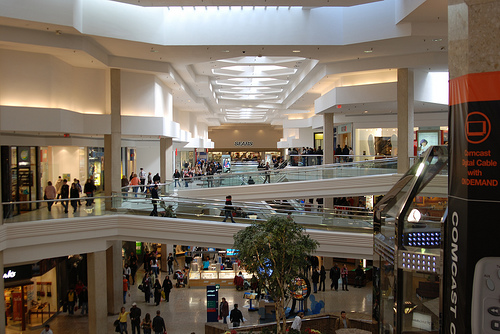
- Woodfield Mall in 2009
- Location: Schaumburg, Illinois, United States
- Coordinates: 42°2′48″N 88°2′13″W
- Opened: September 9, 1971; 55 years ago
- Renovated: 1995; 2015
- Developer: Taubman Company; Homart Development Company
- Manager: Simon Property Group
- Owner: Simon Property Group (50%)
- Architect: Charles Luckman & Associates and Jickling Lyman & Powell Associates, Inc.
- Num. of stores: 234
- Num. of anchor tenants: 4
- Floor area: 2,154,014 square feet (200,114.4 m^{2})
- Floors: 2 with partial third floor (3 in Macy's and Nordstrom)
- Public transit: Pace
- Website: Official website

Woodfield Mall is a shopping mall located in the northwest Chicago suburb of Schaumburg, Illinois, United States, near the interchange of Golf Road and Interstate 290. The mall is the largest shopping mall in the state of Illinois, the largest mall in all of Chicago and the second largest being Oakbrook Center in Oak Brook. It is also one of the largest shopping malls in the United States. The mall features four traditional retailers, which are JCPenney, Macy's, Nordstrom, and Primark.

The mall is located approximately 27 miles (43 km) from the Chicago Loop and attracts more than 27 million visitors each year.

The mall was originally developed by Taubman Centers, which later sold the mall to CalPERS, Miller Capital Advisory, and GM Pension Trusts. Taubman continued to manage the mall until December 31, 2012, when GM Pension Trusts sold its stake in the mall to Simon Property Group, which took over management effective January 1, 2013. However, due to a deal, Simon now owns 50% of the mall.

== History ==
=== 1960s–1970s ===
Construction began on Woodfield Mall in October 1969 and the mall opened on September 9, 1971, with 59 stores, growing to 189 stores with 1.9 million retail square feet by 1973, along with a 135-foot (41 m) water tower to supply water to the mall and the nearby village. It was the largest mall in the United States at the time of its opening.

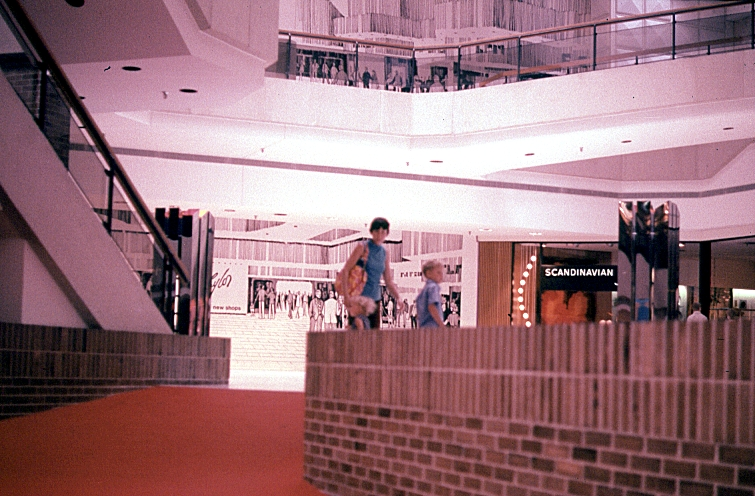
Woodfield Mall in 1973

Woodfield Mall is named after former Sears board chairman General Robert E. Wood and Marshall Field and Company founder Marshall Field. It was built on 191 acres (0.77 km^{2}) of prairie land, previously occupied by farms, cows, and a village tavern. Singer Carol Lawrence, actor Vincent Price, and two marching bands entertained at the debut. At the time of its opening, it claimed to be the world's largest shopping center. By the end of September 1971, another 28 stores and restaurants had opened and that first business year finished with 138 specialty retailers. Originally, the mall covered 1,900,000 square feet (180,000 m^{2}) of retail space, compared to the gross leasable area of the mall today, which is 2,154,014 square feet (200,114 m^{2}). In 1973, a new Lord & Taylor wing was constructed, along with 50 additional new retailers.

=== 1980s–1990s ===
Sbarro opened in 1984 and A&W opened in 1985. The 5-plex opened for business on July 30, 1971. The mall also had a pair of free-standing twin cinemas, Woodfield Theatres 1 & 2 and Woodfield Theatres 3 & 4, at the perimeter of the mall near Golf Road. The 1 & 2 was opened with two G-rated films, including a Disney movie, and the 3 & 4 later opened; both were closed and demolished in the 1990s, replaced by additional retail. The Woodfield Mall Cinemas 5-plex closed in 2000 and was last operated by Cineplex Odeon Corporation. After it closed, the space was turned into a theme restaurant called Mars 2112, which was short-lived. The former theater area was converted into an Improv Comedy Club in 2006, the first location in Illinois. The Loews Theatres at the Streets of Woodfield, an outdoor shopping center next to Woodfield Mall, made its debut as a 20-screener on December 10, 1999. The Streets of Woodfield was built between 1999 and 2000, replacing another indoor mall, One Schaumburg Place, which opened in 1991. The Streets of Woodfield featured Carson's, Dick's Sporting Goods (formerly Galyan's), and GameWorks. The freestanding Loews Theatres complex was eventually rebranded by the AMC Theatres chain in 2016. Carson's at The Streets of Woodfield closed in 2018. A&W closed in 2019.

An outdoor shopping center named Woodfield Village Green opened across the street in late 1993. In October 1994, a three-story parking garage attached to Marshall Field's opened. That year, TGI Fridays opened northwest of the mall. Hooters would open in the surrounding area a year layer in 1995. In celebration of its 20th anniversary in 1991, Woodfield added 23 more stores, including The Disney Store (closed in 2021), and then in 1995, Woodfield grew again with a $110 million wing that included 50 new specialty stores. Rainforest Cafe was added to the mall in October of that same year. (closed in 2020, replaced by Peppa Pig's World of Play) On March 3, 1995, the mall opened a three-level Nordstrom, as well as a larger replacement Lord & Taylor. Of these new-for-1995 stores, nearly 40 were flagship concepts and designs, with about 27 of them the largest in their chains. In June 1997, a Stir Crazy restaurant opened between Sears and Marshall Field's. Joe's Crab Shack opened on the northeast edge of the mall the same year, but it was one of 41 locations in the chain to close in 2017. IKEA opened a three-story location across from Woodfield Mall on November 18, 1998.

While all of this expansion continued at Woodfield Mall, the surrounding village of Schaumburg grew as well. In 1970, the population was 19,000; in 1980, it mushroomed to 55,000; and, according to the U.S. Census Bureau, Schaumburg had over 75,000 people in 2000. Schaumburg Mayor Al Larson observed that, "Woodfield established a focal point for development throughout all of the northwest suburbs. Without Woodfield, we wouldn't have office towers in Itasca or corporate development in Hoffman Estates."

In 1995, Woodfield Associates commissioned a brand new $128,000 paint job for the mall water tower. Woodfield paid an additional $97,000 for the exterior painting. Both the interiors and exteriors of the water tower were completely repainted. The tower was completely drained of water before the new paint job could be applied. Afterwards, the interior and exterior of the tower were thoroughly cleaned, and rust spots were treated properly. The painting of the interior began after the cleaning and treatment, followed by the painting of the exterior. For the exterior, Woodfield chose a base layer of light gray, along with four continuous, teal "W"s (for Woodfield) around the bowl of the tower. The entire painting process took around 350 gallons of paint.

=== 2000s–2010s ===
DSW and Linens 'n Things opened outside the mall east of Sears and Marshall Field's in 1999; Linens 'n Things would officially close in 2008 and Ashley Furniture opened in its spot on March 26, 2010. Multiple restaurants would open in 2001; Red Robin, in the Lord & Taylor wing and The Cheesecake Factory, in the JCPenney wing. An Apple Store opened in the Lord & Taylor wing on August 24, 2001. The following year, Torrid opened on the second floor in the JCPenney wing on September 18, 2002, six days after a store of the same name at Orland Square Mall in Orland Park opened. A Lego Store was added to the mall in 2003 as one of seven "prototype" stores across the United States. Fountains, the waterfall and the aquariums were removed from the mall in 2004. The water tower was repainted in 2005, ten years after its original repaint. The current scheme includes small, black text reading "Woodfield Mall" with large white clouds in the background, along with a representation of Schaumburg's skyscrapers in blue right below the text. Blue sky can be seen above the clouds, covering the top of the bowl. P.F. Chang's China Bistro and Texas de Brazil opened at the mall in 2005, bringing the restaurant count within the mall to 38. Following the acquisition of Marshall Field's by Macy's, the store was renamed in September 2006.

=== 2010s–2020s ===
A McDonald's was renovated in June 2012. Also, that same year, Pink by Victoria's Secret opened to the public. LongHorn Steakhouse opened on the northeast corner outside of the mall in October 2012. Three stores opened at the mall in 2013, Forever 21 and a two-story H&M opened in the Sears wing.

Lululemon and Arhaus opened in the Lord & Taylor and Nordstrom wings in June 2014. A portion of the second level of Sears was subleased to Level 257 (now Enterrium), a Pac-Man-themed restaurant featuring a bowling alley, an arcade and pinball machines in 2015. Along with a major renovation, Zara, Timberland, Kids Foot Locker and rue21 opened.

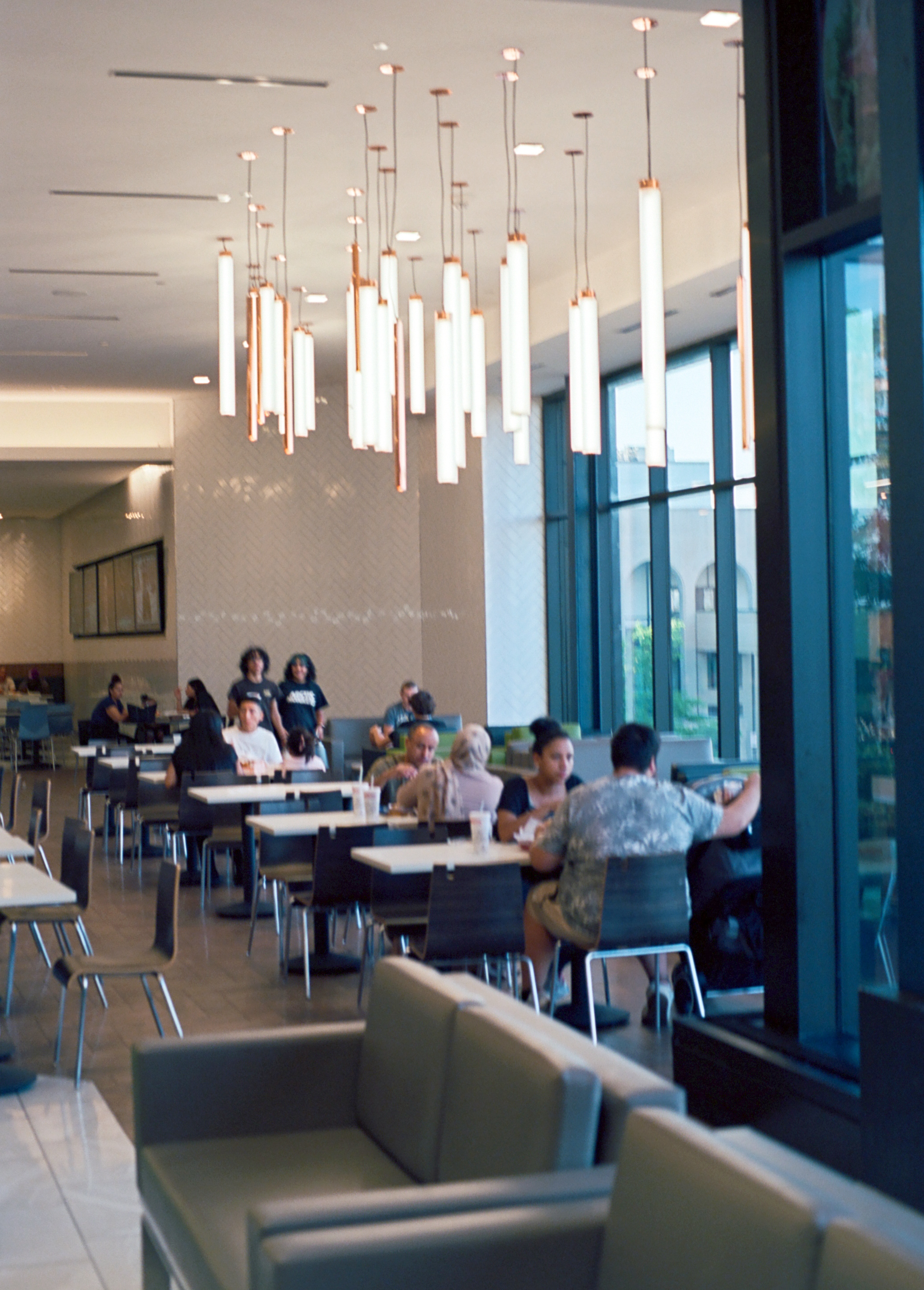
A partial view of the farthest usable section of the Dining Pavilion at the Woodfield Mall, which opened in 2017. A prominent glass wall (right) offers diners a northeasterly view of the mall parking lot and various adjacent structures.

Uncle Julio's officially opened in the JCPenney wing in 2016, replacing Ruby Tuesday, which closed in 2012. That year, Hampton Inn opened outside the mall on the west side. Victoria's Secret was substantially remodeled in 2017. A large food court, known as the "Dining Pavilion", opened on the second floor in 2017, in the east court opposite of the main mall entrance. It features Chipotle Mexican Grill, Blaze Pizza, and more. It replaced two level 2 stores: F.Y.E., which moved to a smaller location on the lower level near Dunkin' Donuts. A year before the opening of the Dining Pavilion, a fourth elevator was added. A'GACI ladies' wear has since closed.

In the summer of 2018, Blocks to Bricks, a hybrid store and museum dedicated to Lego and other construction toys, opened. In October 2018, Uniqlo, a Japanese clothing chain, opened in the JCPenney wing. Also, a salon was added in the Sears wing near Jimmy John's. Shake Shack opened outside the mall in October 2019. Molly's Cupcakes opened in the Nordstrom wing in December 2019.

=== 2020s–present ===
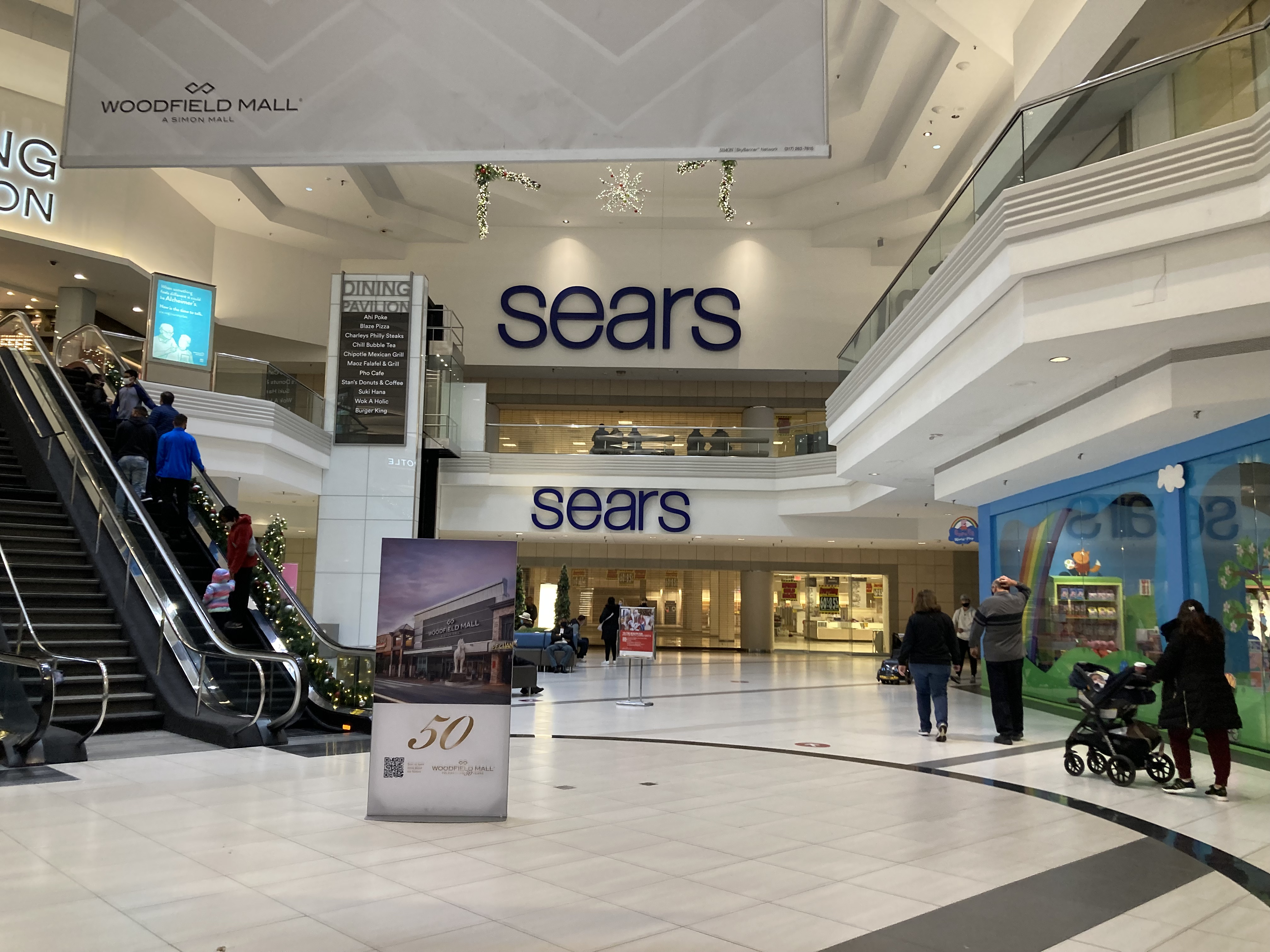
The Sears store in its last day of operation at the mall in 2021

The dawn of the 2020s saw multiple department store closures, due to competition from digital retailers and the COVID-19 pandemic. In August 2020, Lord & Taylor closed its anchor store, when the chain went out of business as a result of economic impact of the COVID-19 pandemic. In September 2021, it was announced that the Sears anchor store would close. It closed on November 14, 2021, the chain's last store in Illinois, after 50 years of operation. Primark opened on the upper level of the former Sears anchor store on October 12, 2023.

By 2023, since the government lockdown, Woodfield Mall had announced several newest additions. In addition to Primark, new additions include Miniso, Radio Flyer, Abercrombie & Fitch, Gilly Hicks, Showcase, Lovisa, Offline by Aerie, Earthbound, Athleta, Warby Parker, and The North Face.

In August 2023, Radio Flyer announced that they will be opening their first retail store at Woodfield Mall after 106 years. The Radio Flyer store opened in November 2023. However, on January 24, 2025, Radio Flyer announced the closure of the Woodfield Mall store.

In January 2024, Zellano Home Furniture moved into the lower level of the former Sears department store. However, the store is not designated as an anchor store because it is not connected to the mall.

Velocity Esports opened at the mall on March 23, 2024. It closed the following year due to the chain filing for bankruptcy.

== Renovations ==
The mall in 2015 with construction (bottom left). The depicted site was opened as a playplace.

Woodfield planned and announced a $13.8 million renovation in January 2015. The makeover consisted of an updated grand court, including the removal of the brick fixtures and leveling out many multi-leveled sections of floor. The renovation also includes new flooring for both lower and upper levels, replacing two existing elevators, and adding one new elevator. The renovation was finished by the end of the year.

In 2017, Woodfield planned and announced a $14 million renovation to introduce a new food court next to the Sears wing. The food court, known as the "Dining Pavilion", introduced a seating area containing 820 seats for quality fast-casual dining restaurants such as Chipotle Mexican Grill, Charley's Philly Steaks, Blaze Pizza, Burger King, and more.

== Car incident ==
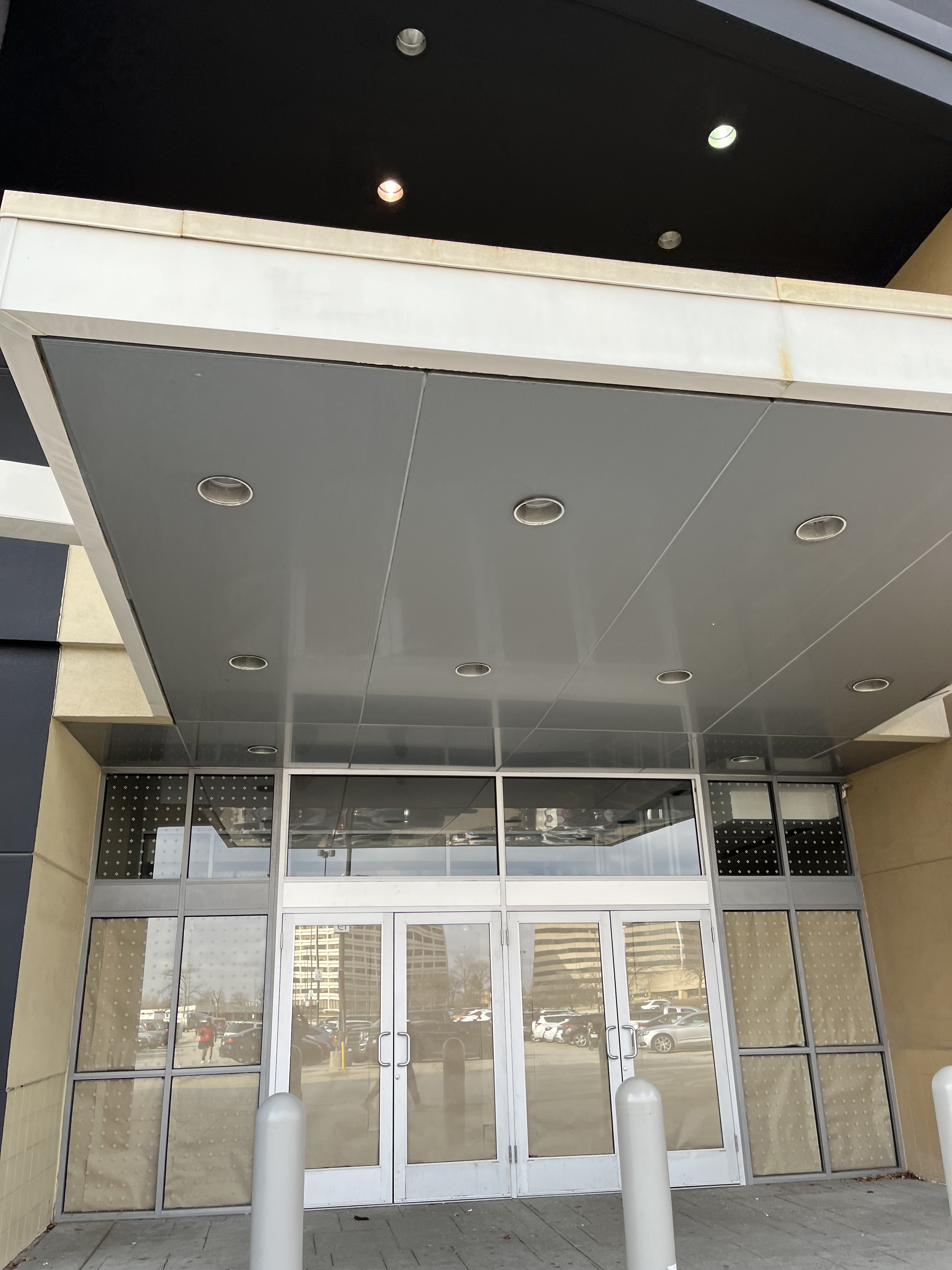
The entrance where the incident occurred

On September 20, 2019, at around 2:30 pm CDT, a man drove a black first generation Chevrolet TrailBlazer LT through an entrance door of Sears and began driving through the store and into the main concourse of the mall, crashing into kiosks, Clarks, International Diamond Company, and multiple other stores, seemingly targeting Forever 21 and other adjacent stores. The driver was taken into custody by responding police near the center of the mall's first level without further incident. No injuries were reported, but the mall was temporarily on lockdown due to the incident as well as concurrent, but unfounded, reports of an active shooter. The mall was evacuated about one hour after the incident.

The man, later identified as 22-year-old Javier Garcia of Palatine, Illinois, was charged with terrorism as a result of the incident. Garcia's family spoke out arguing that Javier is not a terrorist and that he has schizophrenia. A police investigation alleged that Garcia's attack was premeditated, with investigators stating that Garcia had "searched 'Woodfield Mall,' the aerial view of the mall and mall premises 124 times" on his phone a day before the incident. In October 2023, Garcia took a plea deal plea guilty to the criminal damage charge in exchange for a seven-year sentence from a local judge, which was later reduced by 50% for good behavior. He was satisfied by the 1,475 credit days he earned while awaiting trial and was released from prison on October 11, 2023.

== Bus routes ==
Pace

- 208 Golf Road
- 554 Elgin/Woodfield (Monday-Saturday only)
- 604 Wheeling/Schaumburg (Monday-Saturday only)
- 606 Rosemont/Schaumburg Limited

== See also ==
- The Streets of Woodfield
