= Enterrium =

Illinois restaurant based on Pac-Man

Coordinates: 42°02′44.6″N 88°2′5.6″W

- Interactive map of Enterrium

Restaurant information
- Established: 2015
- Owners: Namco USA (2015–2021); Kiddleton (2021–present)
- Head chef: Aaron Whitcomb
- Food type: Contemporary American
- Location: 2 Woodfield Mall, Schaumburg (village), Illinois, 60173, United States
- Seating capacity: 1,000
- Reservations: OpenTable
- Website: www.enterrium.info

Enterrium (formerly known as Level 257 then Pac-Man Entertainment) is a contemporary American restaurant and video arcade located at Woodfield Mall in Schaumburg, Illinois. The restaurant and entertainment destination was originally inspired by Pac-Man and the name refers to the famous kill screen, which occurs when the player reaches the 256th level of the original Pac-Man game, meaning "the next level of dining and entertainment". It was owned by Bandai Namco Entertainment from 2015 to 2021, which also owns all Pac-Man-related intellectual property. The restaurant celebrated its soft opening on March 2, 2015, and its grand opening in April 2015.

In May 2021, the location was sold to Kiddleton, a joint venture between GENDA and Round One Corporation, and was rebranded as the Enterrium.

== History ==
The restaurant was first conceived as a prototype in 2013, when Namco announced that the restaurant (codenamed Level 256 at the time) was being developed in partnership with a restaurateur in Kansas City, saying that were eyeing the Chicago area for possible locations. The restaurant celebrated its soft opening on March 2, 2015.

In May 2021, Pac-Man Entertainment was sold to Kiddleton, following Bandai Namco's decision to withdraw the amusement facility business in North America, citing the COVID-19 pandemic heavily impacting their business. Pac-Man Entertainment would be rebranded as the Enterrium, stripping the location of its Pac-Man theme.

== Events ==
The restaurant celebrated the 35th anniversary of Pac-Man on Friday, May 22, 2015. It featured a live performance of "Pac-Man Fever" by Jerry Buckner of Buckner & Garcia.

== Style ==
It sits on 42,000 square feet which was previously used as a warehouse for a Sears department store. In addition, the restaurant also features sixteen boutique bowling lanes, table tennis and social sports, as well as video and board games in the Lost & Found Game Lounge. The interior decor is up-scale modern urban-chic in style and includes levels of references to the video game character Pac-Man. The menu also features references to well-known video game terms of the 1980s, such as "1-UP", chocolate "power pellets", and "Game Over".
