= Sea Life Michigan =

Sea Life Michigan Aquarium
- Interactive map of Sea Life Michigan Aquarium
- 42°42′13″N 83°17′47″W
- Location: Auburn Hills, Michigan
- Owner: Merlin Entertainments
- Website: www.visitsealife.com/michigan

Sea Life Michigan Aquarium is the state's largest aquarium with over 250 species and 2,000 creatures including sharks, rays, and green sea turtles. Exhibits include freshwater lakes, coral reef, shipwreck, an interactive touch pool and a 180 degree underwater ocean tunnel. Sea Life Michigan is located at Great Lakes Crossing Outlets in Auburn Hills, Michigan, and is owned and operated by Merlin Entertainments.

== Main species ==
The main species are:

- Blacktip reef shark
- Green sea turtle
- Nurse shark
- Seahorse
- Cownose ray
- Jellyfish
- Clownfish
- Green moray eel

== Conservation ==
Sea Life Michigan is involved with a number of conservation activities. These include:

=== Protecting local lake sturgeon ===
Sea Life Michigan raises lake sturgeon and re-introduces them to local habitats when they have reached maturity in efforts to re-populate local lakes and rivers.

=== Seahorse breeding ===
Sea Life Michigan actively breeds potbelly seahorses in order to reduce the stress on wild populations. In the event the species becomes critically endangered, Sea Life will be able to assist in re-populating the wild.

=== Re-homing ===
Sea Life Michigan re-homed two juvenile green sea turtles named Benson and Carr. Both were struck by boats and suffered irreparable damage to their shells and spines. They both now live in Sea Life's ocean tank which features a 180 degree underwater ocean tunnel.

=== Watershed clean-ups ===
Sea Life Michigan participates in and promotes watershed clean-ups of local rivers, streams and lakes with partners including the Clinton River Watershed Council, Friends of the Detroit River and Save Lake St. Clair.

=== Protection of turtles ===
A fundraising campaign run by Sea Life has enabled a new Sea Turtle Rescue and Wildlife Information Center to be built on the Greek island of Zakynthos to treat turtles which have been injured in collisions with boats or entanglement in fishing gear.
