= Steven Schussler =

American businessman

Steven Schussler (born 1955) is an American developer of theme restaurants, best known as the creator of the Rainforest Cafe. He has created, built and owns T-Rex Cafe, Yak & Yeti Restaurant, Betty & Joe's, Hot Dog Hall of Fame, Galaxy Drive In, Backfire Barbeque, and JukeBox Saturday Night.

Schussler is the author of It’s a Jungle in There, a book chronicling his experience building businesses and providing advice to aspiring entrepreneurs.

== Early life ==
Schussler grew up in Queens, New York. His parents divorced when he was a child. Schussler worked a multitude of different jobs before the age of 16, ranging from newspaper delivery to bricklaying to painting. He moved to Miami at 18 in order to pursue a career in radio, working as a lineman for Southern Bell until he could find a position at a radio station. After interviewing failed, he decided to hide in a crate dressed as Superman and have it delivered to a local radio station to surprise the general manager. The stunt worked, and he was hired. After eventually working in executive roles in the television and radio industries, he would move into attractions and restaurants, including working with Walt Disney World and Universal Orlando, and founded Rainforest Cafe in 1994.

== Rainforest Cafe ==
The restaurants are decorated to depict some features of a rainforest, including plant growth, mist, waterfalls, animatronic robots of animals and insects. Large marine aquariums are common in most restaurants. Automated water sprinklers and synchronized lights set to specific patterns are also featured. A simulated thunderstorm occurs every thirty minutes, utilizing simulated rain as well as flashing lights and high-powered subwoofers for lightning and thunder. The restaurants are partitioned into several rooms by means of rain curtains that fall into basins running along the tops of partition walls and booths.

The staff of Rainforest Cafe are named in accordance to the "Safari" theme. Servers are called Safari Guides, Hosts/Hostesses are Tour Guides, Retail Sales Associates are Pathfinders, Bartenders are Navigators, Bussers are Safari Assistants and kitchen staff are named Trailblazers.

The animatronic figures are manufactured by UCFab International, LLC of Apopka, Florida, USA. The star ceilings are designed and manufactured by Fiber Optic Systems Inc, located in Whitehouse Station, New Jersey. Rainforest Cafe restaurants also have a Retail Village, rainforest themed merchandise is sold.

== It’s A Jungle In There ==
In 2010 Schussler published It's a Jungle in There: Inspiring Lessons, Hard-Won Insights, and Other Acts of Entrepreneurial Daring, a book intended as inspiration to other entrepreneurs, and donated proceeds to Smile Network International.

== Gallery ==
A typical sign outside of Rainforest Cafe, this one is located at Disney's Animal Kingdom in Orlando, Florida.

The inside of the Rainforest Cafe at Disney Springs in Orlando, Florida.

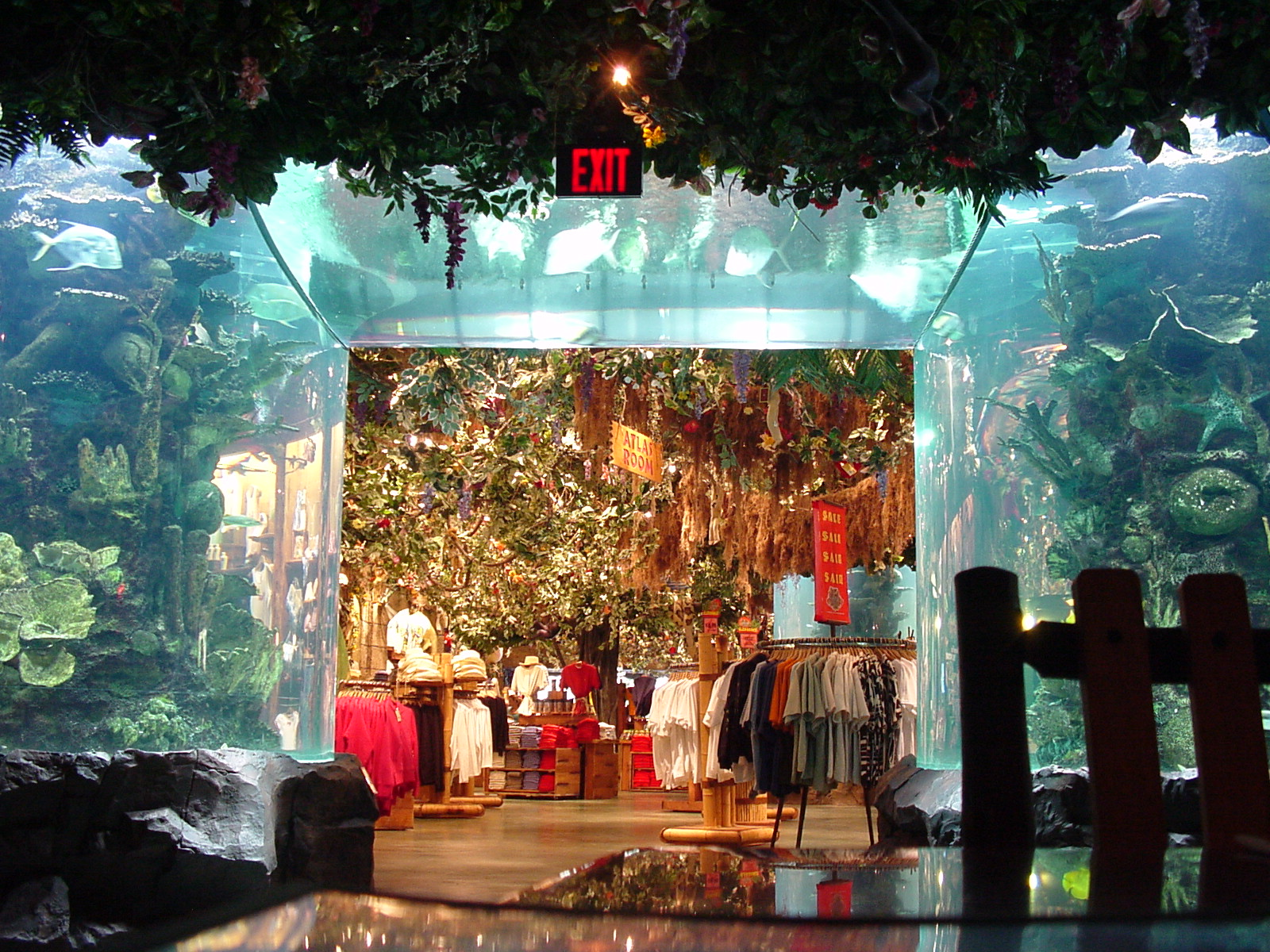
Rainforest Cafe at Disney's Animal Kingdom in Orlando Florida.
