= Showcase (retailer) =

Canadian retail company

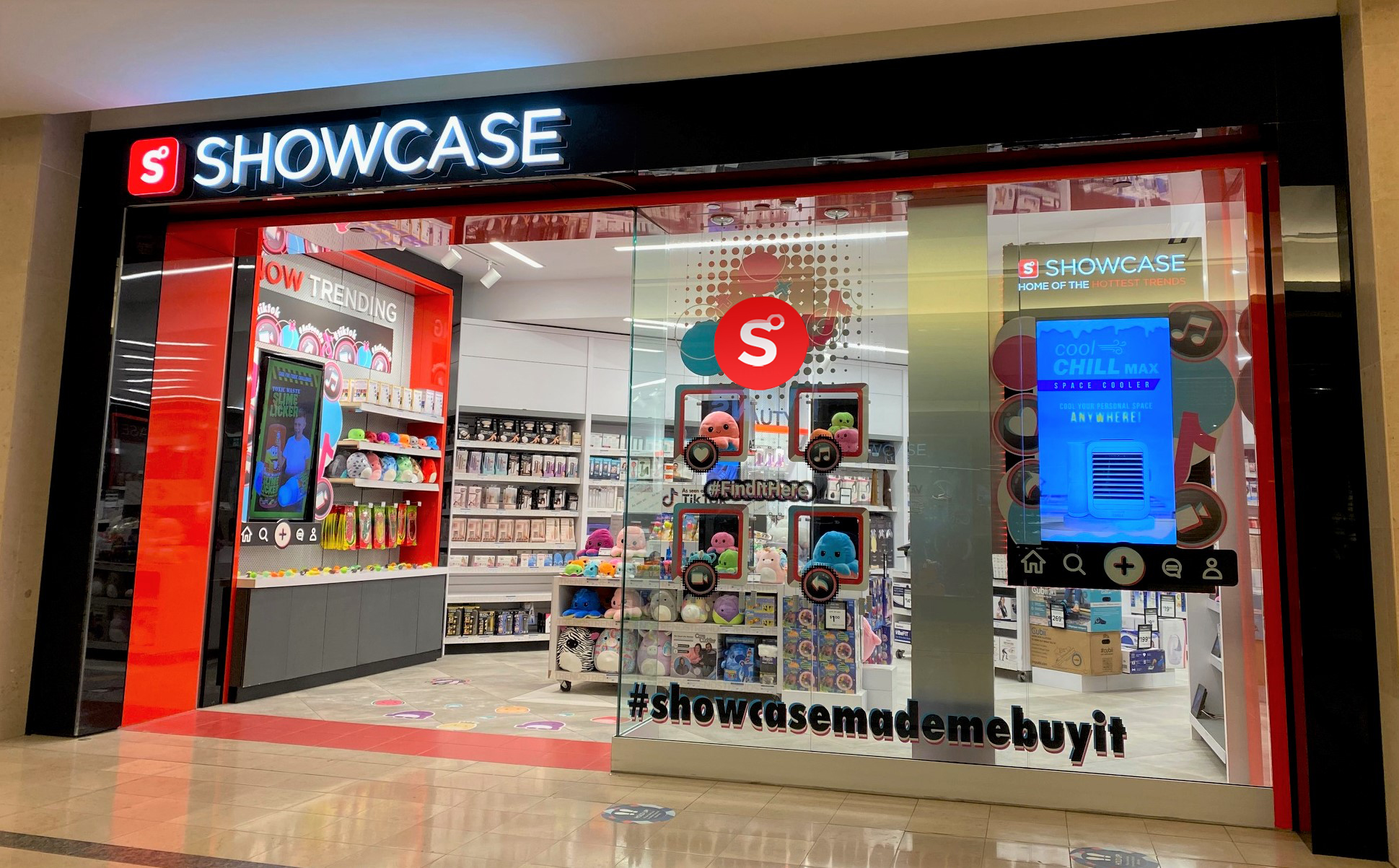
- Showcase at Sherway Gardens
- Industry: Retail
- Founded: 1994
- Headquarters: 1 Wilkinson Rd; Brampton, Ontario, Canada
- Number of locations: 150 (Canada and USA)
- Areas served: Canada, United States
- Products: Health, beauty, home, and toys
- Website: shopatshowcase.com

Showcase is a North American retail company specializing in emerging trends in health, beauty, home, and toys. It has won Canada's Best Managed Companies 3 years running in 2021, 2022, and 2023 and the RCC Excellence in Retailing Omni-Channel Award in 2022. There are 150 locations in malls across Canada and the USA, an e-commerce portal called ShopAtShowcase.com, and as of 2023 stated that it was expanding in the US.

== History ==
The first Showcase store was opened in 1994 in the Meadowlark Centre in Edmonton, Alberta, Canada. At the turn of the 21st century the company opened an average of five stores per year. At this time, the company was primarily franchise-based, and modeled primarily as an infomercial outlet store.

Starting in 2003, the company redesigned stores and began to launch proprietary product lines such as Dream Away, Quantum, and Kyoto and expanded beyond infomercial boundaries, and officially adopted the name "Showcase".

== Brands ==
Showcase sells health, beauty, home, toy, tech, and food products popularised on social media platforms including TikTok, Facebook, and Instagram. The company updated its store design and branding to "The Home of the Hottest Trends". A store with the new design and branding was opened in Sherway Gardens in 2018, followed by Toronto Eaton Centre in 2021, and Woodfield Mall in Chicago in 2022.

According to the Corporate Overview on the company's website it intended to open 100 US stores by 2024. Ten pilot stores opened in the Northeast in 2018-19, including King Of Prussia outside of Philadelphia, with locations in Connecticut, Delaware, New Jersey, New York and Pennsylvania, followed by 31 more stores across the USA in 2022.

In May 2021 and in 2022 Showcase was named one of Canada's Best Managed Companies for 2021 in a program sponsored by Deloitte and Canadian Business.

== COVID-19 response ==
In March 2020 Showcase started retailing personal protective equipment (PPE). It was declared an essential service in most parts of Canada, and stayed open nation-wide during Canada's lockdowns from March to June 2020. Showcase received a COVID-19 Site License and a Medical Device Establishment License from Health Canada.

== Proprietary brands ==
Showcase owns various proprietary brands that sell in-store and online including:

- Gravity Blade - hoverboards and electric scooters
- Squishies - slow-rising foam toys
- Hidden Gems - jewellery candles and bath bombs
- Dream Away - bedding and weighted blankets
- Cloud9 - super-soft leisurewear and bedding
- Quantum - health and fitness
- Kyoto - eco-friendly products
- Esencia - aromatherapy and essential oils
- EcoTerra - eco-friendly products
- Peplos - shapewear and hair extensions
- Trendy Treasures - mystery boxes and advent calendars

== Trademarks ==
=== Canada ===
The trade name Showcase, As Seen on TV Showcase, TV Showcase, "The Best of As Seen on TV and more!" and its variants are trademarked in Canada. Trademarks include:

Showcase The Best of As Seen on TV and more

The best of as-seen-on-TV and more!

TV Showcase Products and Demonstration Stores

As Seen on TV Showcase

The Best of As Seen on TV and more!

As Seen on TV Showcase and Products and Demonstration Stores

Cloud 9 by Dream Away (design)

Cloud 9 by Dream Away (words)

Kyoto Environmental

Dream Away (design)

Dream Away (words)

Kyoto Environmental

Why dream when you can Dream Away?

You Saw It on TV

Don’t Just Dream … Dream Away!

Eco Savvy

Quantum (design)

Quantum (words)

Squishies (words)

Slow Rise Squishies (words)

=== United States ===
Showcase has registered, or applied for, various trademarks with the United States Patent and Trademark Office, as follows:

Showcase

Showcase The Best of As Seen on TV and more!

The Best of As Seen on TV and more!

Kyoto Environmental

Cloud 9 by Dream Away

Kyoto Environmental Eco Savvy

Quantum
