= Rainforest Cafe =

American jungle-themed restaurant chain

- Restaurant logo
- Type: Subsidiary
- Industry: Restaurants
- Founded: February 3, 1994; 32 years ago, Bloomington, Minnesota
- Founder: Steven Schussler
- Headquarters: Houston, Texas, United States
- Number of locations: 15 restaurants
- Area served: Canada; France; Japan; Malta; United Arab Emirates; United States
- Key people: Tilman J. Fertitta (chairman, president, and CEO)
- Products: Pasta, Seafood, Salad, Sandwiches, Dessert; Merchandise
- Parent: Landry's Restaurants (2000-Present)
- Website: rainforestcafe.com

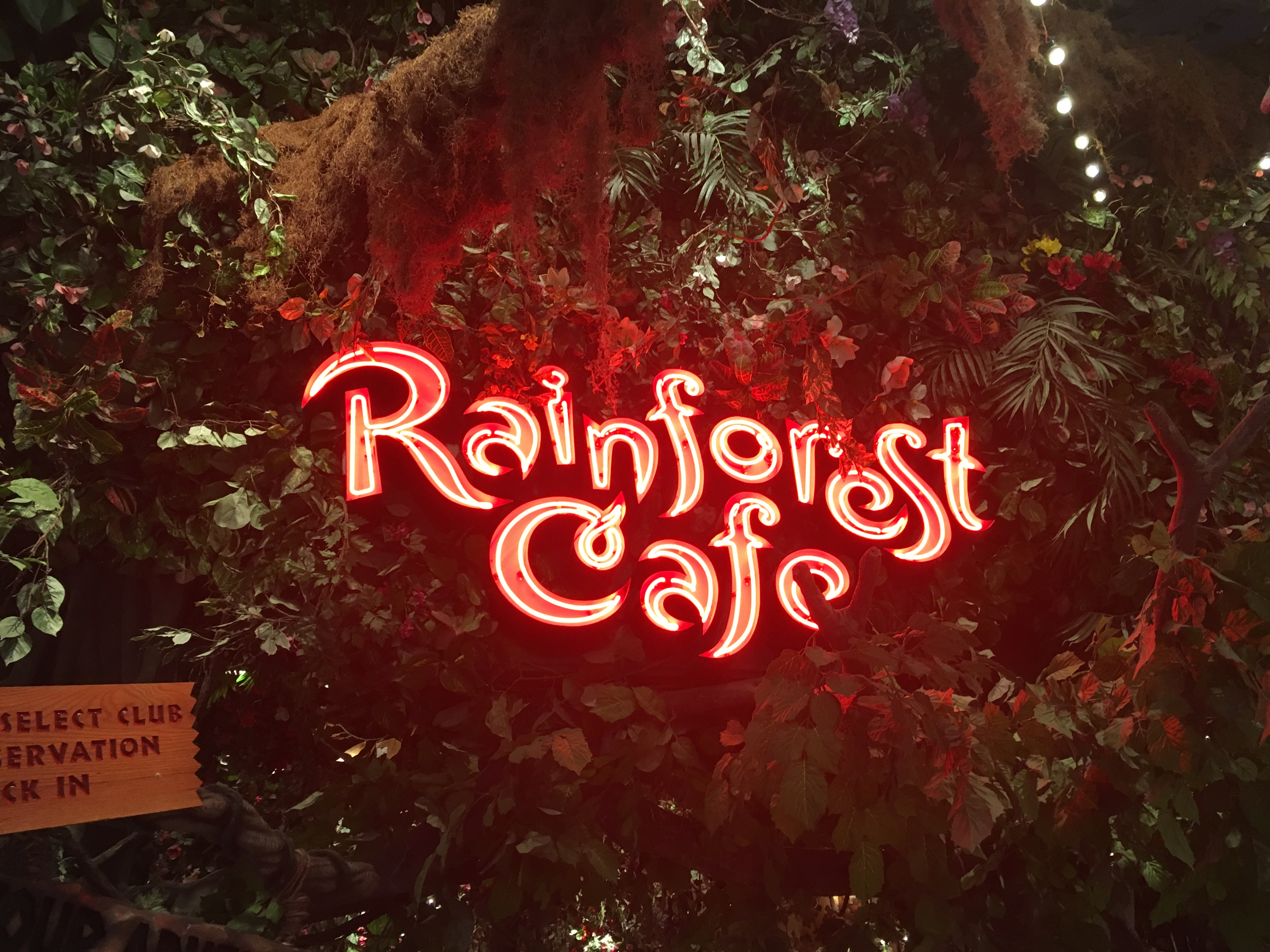
A neon-sign welcomes visitors to Rainforest Cafe, located inside the Great Lakes Crossing Outlets shopping complex in Auburn Hills, Michigan in 2016

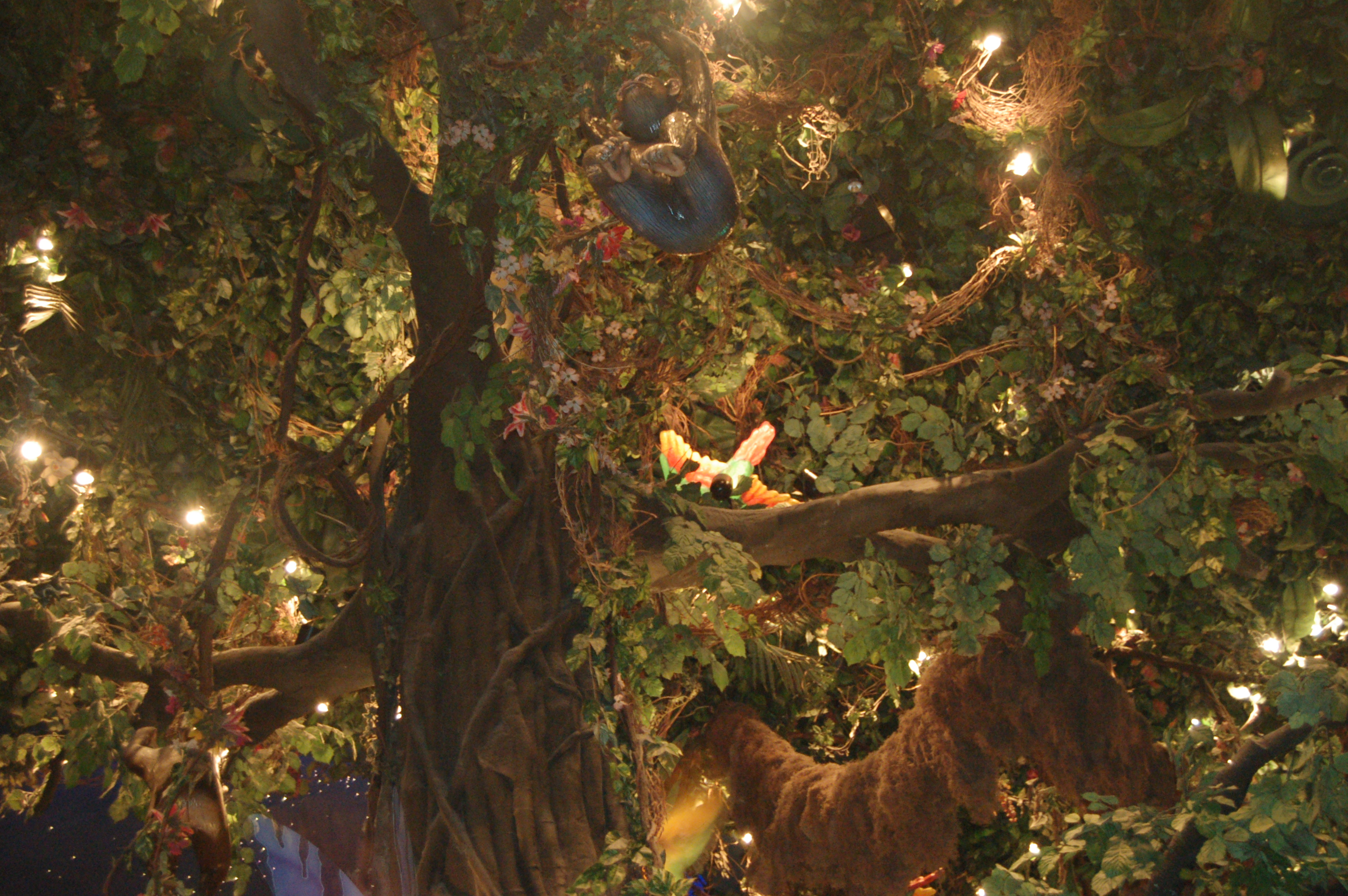
An example of the canopy ceiling including artificial trees and foliage for the Rainforest Cafe at MGM Grand Hotel and Casino in Las Vegas, Nevada in 2008

Rainforest Cafe is a theme restaurant chain owned by Landry's. Each location is designed to evoke the atmosphere of a tropical rainforest, with fake plants, fog machines, waterfalls, and animatronic wildlife.

The first Rainforest Cafe location opened in the Mall of America in Bloomington, Minnesota, on February 3, 1994. By 1997, the chain consisted of six restaurants, all in the United States. The first international location opened in London, England in June 1997. In 1998, it was planned to build 12 additional restaurants in the United States, seven in Mexico, and five in the United Kingdom, for a total of 22 restaurants by 2008.

In 2000, the Rainforest Cafe was bought by Landry's Restaurants Inc., a company specializing in dining, hospitality, entertainment, and gaming, based in Houston, Texas. To date, the company owns restaurants in the United States, Canada, France, the United Arab Emirates, Japan, and Malta. Rainforest Cafe focuses on local tourism for a majority of their income.

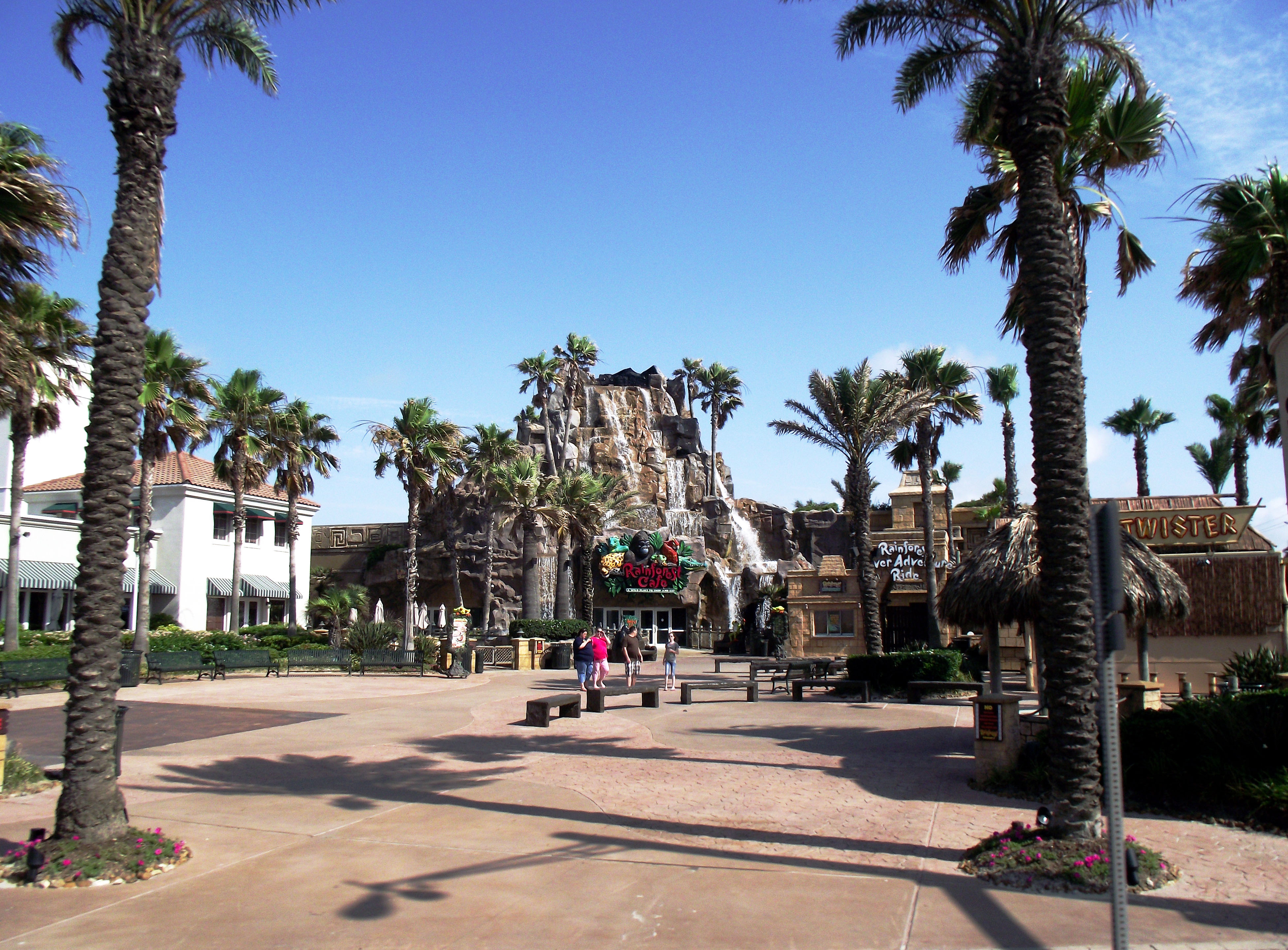
Exterior of the Rainforest Cafe in Galveston, Texas in 2010

== Design ==
The ceiling and much of the walls are lined with artificial foliage, while lower areas and booth seating are decorated with faux rock. Brick textures suggest ancient ruins, and support pillars are made to look like tree trunks. Often, there is a waterfall with a fountain in the dining area, with a statue depicting Atlas holding up the Earth globe with the words "Rescue The Rainforest" to communicate a conservation message. Papier-mâché birds and butterflies are suspended from the trees, and other whimsical rainforest creatures are mounted, as though climbing on the walls or peeking through the foliage. The ceiling above the center of the dining room features a simulated starry night sky, designed and manufactured by Fiber Optic Systems Inc., located in Whitehouse Station, New Jersey. The bar area is situated under a gigantic mushroom, partitioned from the rest of the restaurant by a rain curtain. The chain is known for its characteristic bar stools, made to resemble the legs of animals, designed and sculpted by the artist Glenn Carter. Fish tanks with tropical reef fish are spread throughout the restaurant and the gift shop space. Periodically, a simulated thunderstorm will occur every few minutes, with strobe lights and thunder effects through subwoofers.

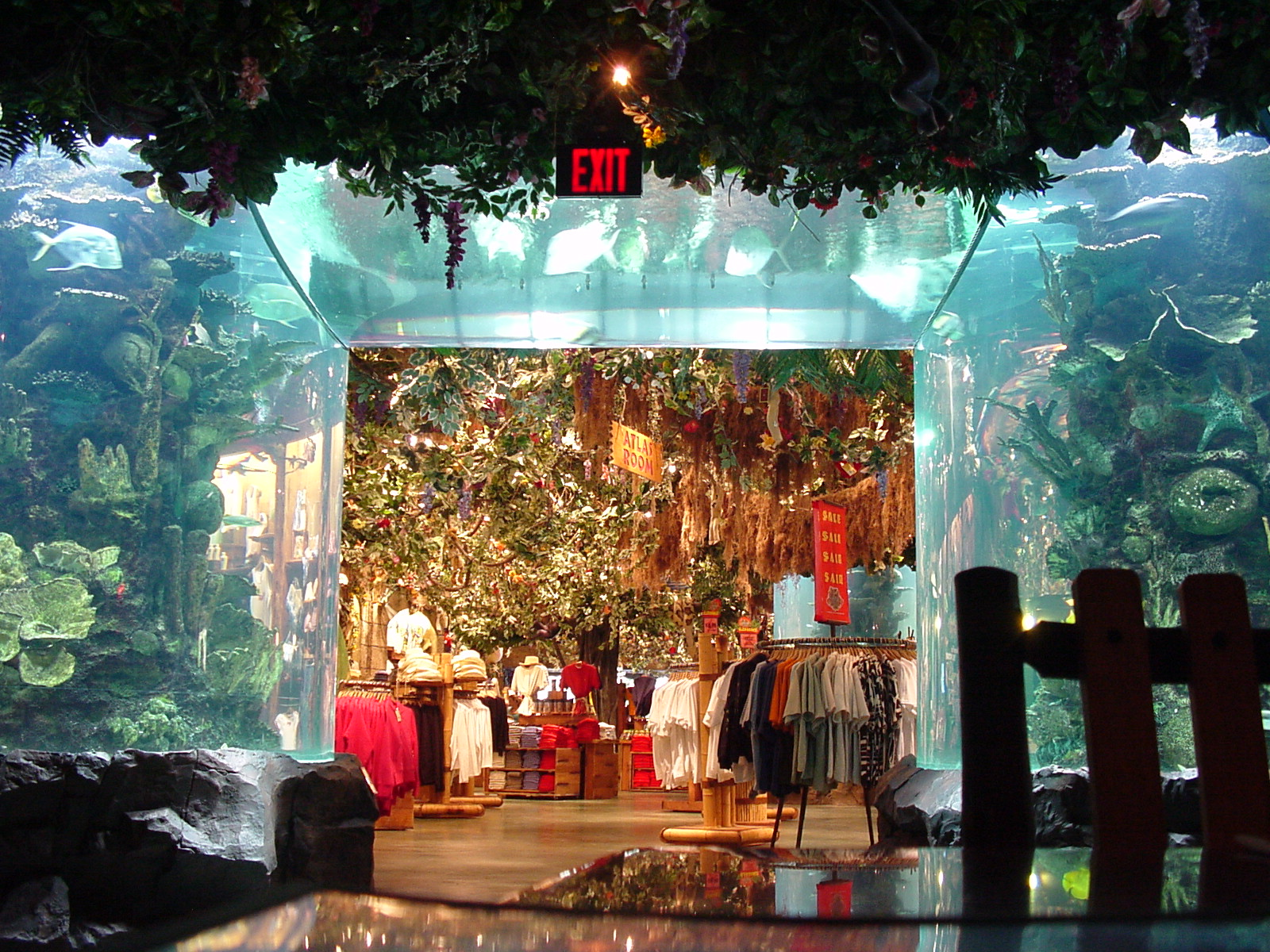
Rainforest Cafe at Disney's Animal Kingdom in 2002

Animatronic animals are spread throughout the restaurant. These include butterflies, elephants, gorillas, leopards, orangutans, chimpanzees, jaguars, lemurs, macaws, monkeys, pandas and tigers, though this will vary by location. The restaurant is laid out so that these animals are set off the ground and are largely above diners' heads, not only allowing them to be seen from farther away, but making them appear larger as well. A crocodile (a hippo in Nashville) and a snake are often located in the gift shop area to attract the attention of passers by greeting guests from above. Tracy Tree, a talking tree, sits inside the shop and provides rainforest facts. The animals are manufactured by Russells Creative, LLC, of Apopka, Florida, formerly UCFab International.

A retail village is located in front of the dining area with an assortment of souvenirs that are rainforest-themed or are branded with the Rainforest Cafe logo, mostly printed by the Atlanta-based fashion apparel company Boxercraft Inc. A small water feature with an animatronic crocodile (a hippo in Nashville) is located just outside the shop, in which visitors are invited to toss coins.

Rainforest Cafe also has a set of eight animal mascots, called "The Wild Bunch". These characters include Cha! Cha!, the red-eyed tree frog; Maya, the jaguar; Rio, the scarlet macaw; Tuki, the elephant; Ozzie, the orangutan; Bamba, the gorilla; Iggy, the green iguana; and Nile, the crocodile. These eight characters may be represented on children's menus, merchandise, or the company logo. A ninth member, Julius Squeezer the boa constrictor, was introduced in September 2026.

== Menu ==
Rainforest Cafe serves typical American chain restaurant fare, such as burgers, chicken, pastas, and seafood, with the addition of some Mexican food to reflect the tropical theme. Their signature dessert, called a volcano cake, consists of chocolate brownie and vanilla ice cream topped with a tinsel stick that mimics the former sparkler effect.

The restaurant also serves alcoholic beverages, some of which are reminiscent of those associated with tiki culture such as the Mai Tai.

== Locations ==
=== U.S. locations ===
- Bloomington, Minnesota – First location, located on the third floor of Mall of America, relocated from the first floor (Original location opened on February 3, 1994; Relocated on January 22, 2016)
- Gurnee, Illinois – Gurnee Mills (Opened in June 1996)
- Lake Buena Vista, Florida – Disney Springs (Opened on August 6, 1996, with about 450 seats)
- Ontario, California – Ontario Mills (Opened on November 14, 1996)
- Sunrise, Florida – Sawgrass Mills (Opened on November 20, 1996)
- Grapevine, Texas – Grapevine Mills (Opened on October 30, 1997)
- Tempe, Arizona – Arizona Mills (Opened on November 20, 1997)
- Bay Lake, Florida – Disney's Animal Kingdom (Opened on April 22, 1998)
- Auburn Hills, Michigan – Great Lakes Crossing Outlets (Opened on November 12, 1998)
- Katy, Texas – Katy Mills (Opened on October 28, 1999)
- Nashville, Tennessee – Opry Mills (Opened on May 11, 2000)
- Galveston, Texas – (Opened on January 10, 2003, features a ride known as the Rainforest River Adventure Ride)
- Atlantic City, New Jersey – Boardwalk (Opened in April 2004)
- San Antonio, Texas – San Antonio River Walk (Opened in January 2006)
- Niagara Falls, New York – Sheraton at the Falls (Opened on June 3, 2015)
- Las Vegas, Nevada – Harmon Corner (Opened on September 2, 2015)

=== International locations ===
- Chessy, Seine-et-Marne, France – Disney Village at Disneyland Paris (Opened in 1999)
- Urayasu, Chiba, Japan – Ikspiari at Tokyo Disney Resort (Opened on July 7, 2000)
- Niagara Falls, Ontario, Canada – Clifton Hill (Opened in May 2001)
- Dubai, United Arab Emirates – Dubai Festival City (Opened in 2020)
- Abu Dhabi, United Arab Emirates – Yas Mall (Opened in November 2020)
- St. Julian's, Malta (Opened in mid-2021)

=== Former locations ===
- Anaheim, California – Downtown Disney (Opened on January 12, 2001; Closed on June 19, 2018)
- Houston, Texas – Houston Galleria Mall (Opened in Spring 2009; Closed in March 2018, replaced by Peli Peli)
- San Francisco, California – Fisherman's Wharf (Opened in May 2000; Closed on October 1, 2017)
- Burlington, Massachusetts – Burlington Mall (Opened in October 1998; Closed on April 26, 2016, replaced by Arhaus)
- Las Vegas, Nevada – MGM Grand Hotel & Casino Las Vegas (Opened on December 18, 1997; Closed on August 30, 2015)
- Toronto, Ontario – Yorkdale Shopping Centre (Opened on June 30, 1999; Closed January 1, 2014.)
- Costa Mesa, California – South Coast Plaza (Opened June 9, 1997; Closed on July 7, 2013; originally located on the second floor, relocated to the first floor)
- Aventura, Florida – Aventura Mall (Opened on December 14, 1997; Closed in 2000)
- Overland Park, Kansas – Oak Park Mall (Opened on February 23, 1999; Closed on January 6, 2009)
- Kowloon Tong, Hong Kong – Festival Walk (Opened November 24, 1998; Closed on January 3, 2003)
- Norfolk, Virginia – MacArthur Center (Opened in June 1999; Closed in 2001)
- Tysons Corner, Virginia – Tysons Corner Center (Opened in October 1996; Closed in 2006)
- Westbury, New York – The Source Mall (Opened in September 1997; Closed on July 19, 2003)
- West Nyack, New York – Palisades Center (Opened on March 19, 1998; Closed in 2002)
- Elizabeth, New Jersey – The Mills at Jersey Gardens (Opened on October 21, 1999; Closed in late 2000)
- Denver, Colorado, – Cherry Creek Shopping Center (Opened in Summer 1998; Closed in 2009)
- Towson, Maryland – Towson Town Center (Opened on March 23, 1999; Closed in January 2009)
- Toronto, Ontario – Scarborough Town Centre, (Opened in February 1999; Closed on January 7, 2001)
- Manchester, England – Trafford Centre (Closed in 2003)
- Burnaby, British Columbia – Metropolis at Metrotown (Opened in June 1998; closed on September 2, 2001)
- Mexico City, Mexico – Metropol Entertainment Central
- Cancún, Mexico – Plaza Forum by the Sea (Opened on August 15, 1997)
- Tlalnepantla, Mexico – Mundo E (Opened on December 17, 1998; Closed in 2016)
- Mexico City, Mexico – Centro Santa Fe
- Istanbul, Turkey – İstinye Park (Closed in 2010.)
- Farmington, Connecticut – Westfarms Mall (Opened in February 2000; Closed in 2013)
- Cairo, Egypt – City Stars Mall (Opened in February 2008, Closed circa 2012.)
- Philadelphia, Pennsylvania – Philadelphia Mills (formerly Franklin Mills) (Opened on November 27, 1998; Closed in February 2001)
- Tukwila, Washington – Westfield Southcenter (Opened on June 29, 1999; Closed in January 2016)
- Bloomington, Minnesota – First floor of Mall of America (Opened on February 3, 1994, with 295 seats, also the first location; Closed in September 2014 for relocation.)
- Schaumburg, Illinois – Woodfield Mall (Opened on October 20, 1995; Closed on January 1, 2020, replaced by Peppa Pig World of Play)
- Chicago, Illinois – Downtown Chicago (Opened on October 2, 1997; Closed on August 12, 2020)
- Dubai, United Arab Emirates – Dubai Mall (Opened in 2009; Closed in 2020, replaced by the Festival City Mall location)
- London, England – Piccadilly Circus (Opened on June 24, 1997; Closed in 2022 and rebranded as Jungle Cave which then closed in 2023)
- Edison, New Jersey – Menlo Park Mall (Opened on September 17, 1998; Closed on February 19, 2025, replaced by Round1 arcade)

== Gallery ==
Rainforest Cafe

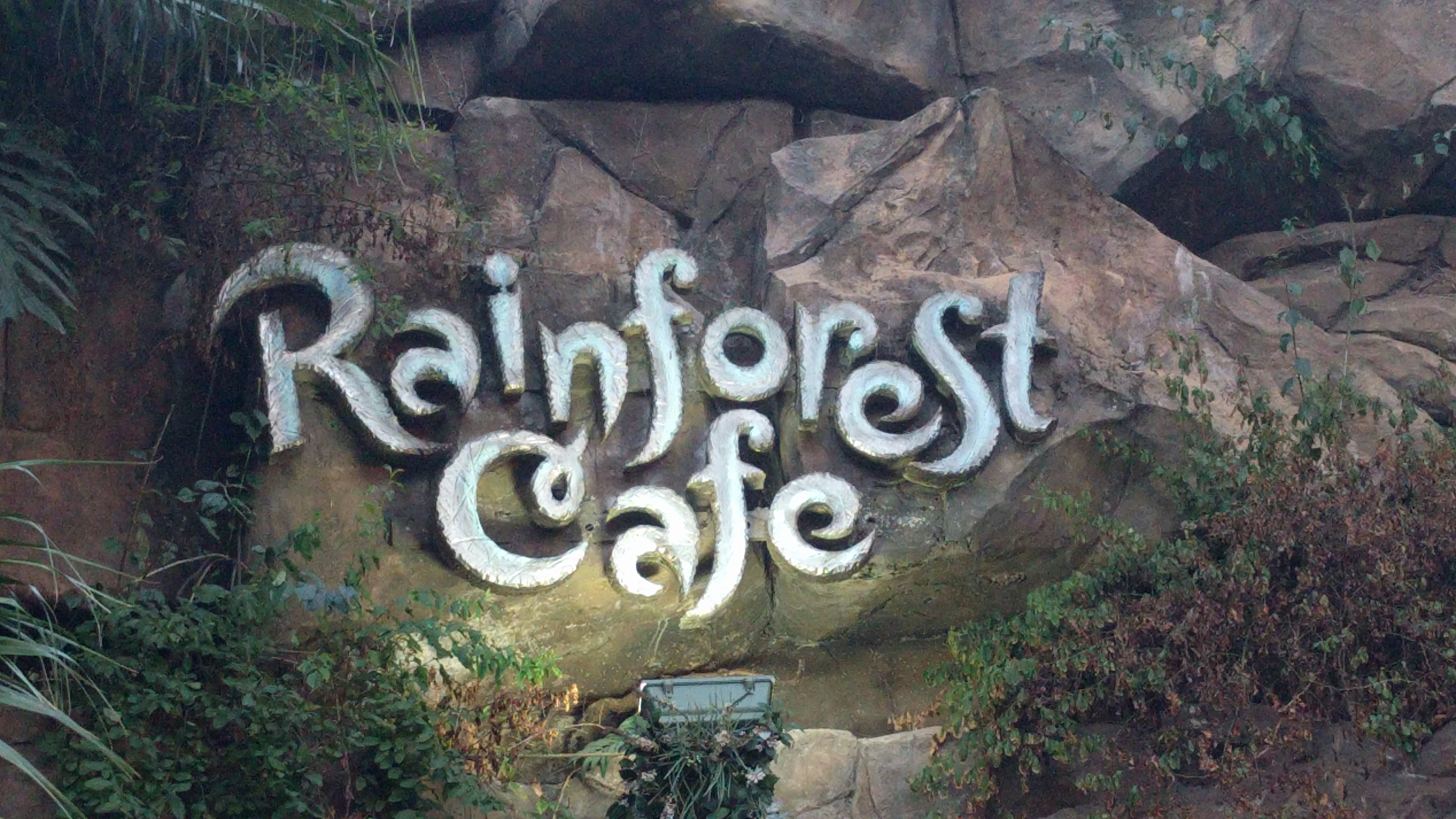
Rainforest Cafe logo at Disney's Animal Kingdom in Bay Lake, Florida on January 12, 2018.

== In popular culture ==
- The restaurant's former location in Burlington Mall in Burlington, Massachusetts, appeared in the 2009 film Paul Blart: Mall Cop.
- Rainforest Cafe sponsored Curious George on PBS Kids, replacing Amazon Grocery & Shea Homes.
- In 2022, YouTube content creators Eddy Burback and Ted Nivison visited and ate at every Rainforest Cafe location in North America, which was chronicled in two videos that went viral and helped sparked a renewed interest in the restaurant chain, especially for Gen Z.
