= Stir Crazy (restaurant) =

Restaurant information
- Location: United States

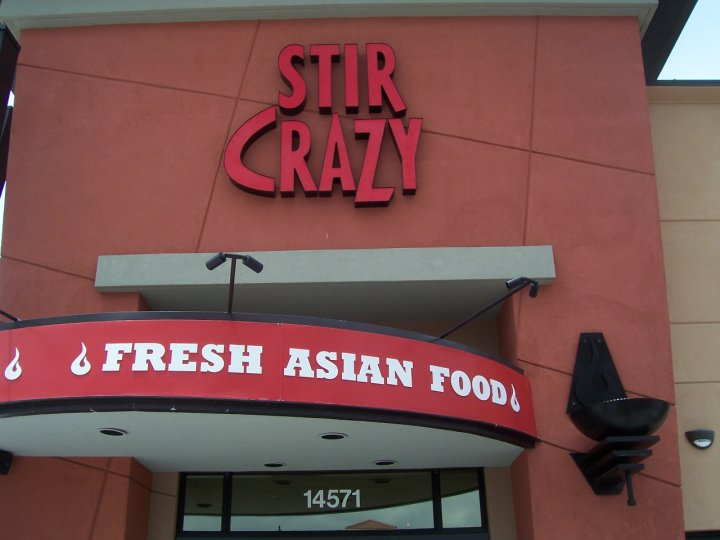
A picture of Stir Crazy in Pembroke Pines, Florida

Stir Crazy was a restaurant chain based in Chicago, Illinois, and other states that specialized in Asian-style stir fry food and other Asian-themed dishes.

Stir Crazy features a Market Bar or "build your own stir fry" menu, where the customer creates a custom stir fry dish from about 30 different vegetables, spices, and sauces. After placing the selections in a small wok, the customer hands it to a chef who prepares it along with a choice of meats, fish, rice, and/or noodles. The stir fry is cooked in front of the customer.

The menu features many traditional Asian appetizers and entrees which are prepared to order and a Crazy Buddha Bar, which serves both traditional drinks and unique Stir Crazy creations. Stir Crazy had locations in Illinois, Wisconsin, Michigan, Florida, Ohio, Missouri, New York, Texas, and Minnesota. In August 2009, Stir Crazy Restaurants LLC merged with Flat Top Grill, also based in the Chicago Metropolitan Area, to form Flat Out Crazy, LLC.

On July 18, 2013, Stir Crazy filed for Chapter 11 bankruptcy. The last remaining restaurant, locating in Creve Coeur, MO, closed in 2020 due to the coronavirus pandemic.

== See also ==
- Stir Crazy Thane
