= America Goes Bananaz =

American television series

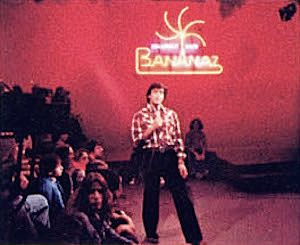
- Michael Young hosting the show.
- Also known as: Columbus Goes Bananaz
- Genre: Variety show
- Created by: Burt Dubrow
- Presented by: Michael Young (1977–78); Randy Hamilton (1979)
- Country of origin: United States
- Original language: English
- No. of seasons: 1
- No. of episodes: 50

Production
- Producer: Burt Dubrow
- Production locations: Westland Mall; Columbus, Ohio
- Camera setup: Multi-camera
- Running time: 45 minutes

Original release
- Network: Columbus Alive (1977–79); Nickelodeon (1979–1980)
- Release: December 1, 1977 – 1980

America Goes Bananaz is an American teen-oriented variety show presented by Michael Young and Randy Hamilton. It premiered locally on QUBE's C-1 channel in 1977, with the title Columbus Goes Bananaz. The series was renamed America Goes Bananaz in preparation for a move to then-upcoming youth-oriented national network Nickelodeon; all episodes aired from January 19, 1979, onward used this title.

Early episodes of the show were broadcast live from the Westland Mall in Columbus, Ohio. Some episodes incorporated the QUBE system's interactivity, having viewers decide which events they would like to see. The series' interactive element was discontinued as the show went national, and episodes were taped in advance from 1979 until the show ended. Notable guest stars included Arnold Schwarzenegger, Chuck Jones, Todd Rundgren, the Sanford-Townsend Band, Andy Kaufman, and Bob Zmuda.

== Format ==
The format of America Goes Bananaz was modeled after the structure of The Mike Douglas Show, which producer Burt Dubrow worked on. The concept was adjusted for a slightly younger audience, and the program was billed as having been "designed for the American adolescent." Recurring segments on America Goes Bananaz included a karate feature hosted by Jay T. Will, audience polls, and advice columns allowing viewers to send the host requests for guidance. Discussions focusing on mature subjects, such as drugs and birth control, were also regularly shown in an effort to interest and educate a teenage target audience. Guest speaker John Steinberg, a "consumer gadfly" notifying viewers of negative purchases like "record album rip-offs," often appeared.

== History ==
According to an interview with Philadelphia Daily News, original host Michael Young first learned of Columbus Goes Bananaz while in his lawyer's office in 1977. He had reportedly just discovered that he was being sued for a play he had co-produced with Herschel Bernardi. Over the telephone, Young's agent informed him that Warner-Amex was holding auditions for a talk show host. Due to his lack of offers at the time, Young decided to try out for the job. Among others auditioning to be the show's host was Tony Dow, whose well-known role as Wally Cleaver on Leave It to Beaver initially made Young believe that Dow would be chosen. According to Young, Dow ultimately stated that Young deserved the role.

The set of America Goes Bananaz during a 1979 taping.

Michael Young was selected and hosted the show for two years, until he moved to ABC's Kids Are People Too in 1979. After Young's departure, actor Randy Hamilton was picked to take over as host. Episodes with Hamilton were taped from January until September 1979. In an event Randy Hamilton termed "an unusual coincidence", Hamilton was chosen as the new host of Kids Are People Too in 1981, after Michael Young quit. Hamilton was selected based on clips of his time as the Bananaz host, provided to ABC by producer Burt Dubrow.

At the time of the program's debut, the preschool-oriented Pinwheel was the flagship property of QUBE's C-3 channel. When the C-3 channel was expanded and renamed Nickelodeon in 1979, Bananaz was broadcast on Nickelodeon as part of an initiative to create programming for all child age groups. Bananaz was integral to the formation of Nickelodeon, described by The Times as part of the channel's "nucleus" in 1980.

Lew Anderson, portrayer of Clarabell the Clown on Howdy Doody from 1954 to 1960, appeared in character as Clarabell on a 1978 episode. He broke a 25-year tradition by removing his face paint for teenagers in the audience who had watched Howdy Doody reruns as children. After the episode aired, Anderson stated that he "wouldn't have done it" if the audience had been young children as opposed to teenagers.

== Awards and nominations ==
In 1980, Warner-Amex Satellite Entertainment and program creator Burt Dubrow received an "Excellence in Entertainment" award from the National Cable & Telecommunications Association for America Goes Bananaz. Later the same year, the series received the ACE Award for "Best Entertainment Program".

Year	Presenter	Award/Category	Nominee	Status	Ref.
1980	NCTA Awards	Excellence in Entertainment	Warner-Amex Satellite Entertainment	Won	
1980	ACE Awards	Best Entertainment Program	Warner-Amex Satellite Entertainment; Burt Dubrow	Won	
