= Bob McAllister =

American TV personality & magician (1935-1998)

- McAllister on the set of Wonderama
- Born: Robert Charles McAllister; June 2, 1935
- Died: July 21, 1998 (aged 63)
- Occupations: television personality, magician, children's entertainer

Robert Charles "Bob" McAllister (June 2, 1935 – July 21, 1998) was an American television personality, magician, and children's entertainer and a host of Wonderama.

== Early career ==
Born in Philadelphia, McAllister first made his name as a ventriloquist on NBC on the Today Show in the 1950s, while still in his teens. He appeared in 1953 on CBS on Ted Mack's Original Amateur Hour and was able to get his first regular television job hosting his own program on WTAR in Norfolk, Virginia. The "Bob and Chauncey Show" paired McAllister with a wise-cracking dummy ("Chauncey"). When that show ended, Bob became WTAR-TV's Bozo the Clown.

This led to his being hired on at WJZ-TV in Baltimore, Maryland in 1963 on The Bob McAllister Show, a half-hour program of comedy character and puppet sketches, magic acts, pantomime, cartoons, and sight gags intended to revive the absurd visual surrealism of Ernie Kovacs' television work.

The Bob McAllister Show was a big success and led to an offer from WNEW-TV in New York City to host his own program there, where it premiered on September 9, 1968. The New York City version of the show was not as successful as the Baltimore broadcast, and time constraints and budget restrictions led to its cancellation on Friday, September 5, 1969, after which it went into reruns.

== Wonderama ==
In 1967, McAllister was brought in as host of the then-local show Wonderama, produced by WNEW-TV, to replace the departing Sonny Fox. McAllister's version of the show premiered on August 13 of that year, and would eventually become Metromedia's most popular children's series. It included material similar to that on The Bob McAllister Show, with the added attractions of game shows, in which he selected children in the audience to participate. These included twisting the tops off cans to see whether snakes or a bouquet of artificial flowers sprang out; the child who opened the sole can with the bouquet won the grand prize. McAllister gave each snake-receiver a consolation prize — usually a toy or a board game — for answering a trivia question correctly.

The musical theme of McAllister's Wonderama was an orchestral arrangement by Andre Kostelanetz of the song "I Ain't Down Yet" from Meredith Willson's Broadway musical The Unsinkable Molly Brown. Audience children typically waved their arms in a diagonal criss-cross fashion over their heads to the beat of the music when it opened and closed each show.

McAllister also hosted reproduced Wonderama shows at various locations, including the Six Flags Great Adventure amusement park in Jackson Township, New Jersey, and the Harvard Club of New York City. He also found the time to host a few children's television specials for WNEW-TV during the late 1960s and early 1970s.

in 1969, a weekday afternoon version of Wonderama premiered, but it was not as successful as the original Sunday afternoon/Sunday morning format and was dropped on Friday, August 21, 1970, returning to its Sunday morning schedule where it continued until Sunday morning, December 25, 1977.

== Characters ==
Characters McAllister played on Wonderama and The Bob McAllister Show included the following:

- The Crazy Magician, whose attempts at magic usually ended in disaster.
- Prof. Fingelheimer, a quirky German-accented inventor who sang a nonsensical but catchy song before showing off his latest contraption:

Fingelheimer, Fingelheimer, Fingel-Dingel-Heimer,

Fingelheimer, Fingelheimer, Fingel-Dingel-Heimer.

The more you Fingel, the less you Heimer,

The less you Heimer, the more you Fingel.

Fingelheimer, Fingelheimer, Fingel-Dingel-Heimer.

This song bore a resemblance to the Boodleheimer song by Stuart Hample, originally published in The Silly Book in 1961.

- A janitor who furnished a can of "instant" whatever and used it to facilitate chores.
- Mike Fury, a superhero who boasted about his supernatural deeds of derring-do and created "explosions" by taking a bite of his "Super Onion" and exhaling forcefully. He also taught children healthy hygienic habits (tooth-brushing, washing, nose-blowing, etc.) by setting a good example for them as "a Goody".
- Zip Code, a Beatnik folk singer
- Thurman, a laid-back farm boy
- Salamander Dilly, an artist who stroked a brush across a blank canvas, creating an image through a "blue screen" technique, a superimposed video special effect that gradually "wiped" the image onto the canvas along with the path of the brush. His name was a playful spoof on that of surrealist painter Salvador Dalí.
- Seymore the Snake, a puppet providing humorous commentary about the show's zany goings-on.

== Other shows ==
In 1974, McAllister hosted a television special, Herbie Day at Disneyland, which exhibited Herbie the Love Bug of Walt Disney Pictures fame before a crowd at the Disneyland theme park in Anaheim, California. This special was produced in conjunction with the personified Volkswagen Beetle's latest feature film, Herbie Rides Again.

In 1975, Monty Hall, impressed by McAllister, flew him out to Los Angeles to host a pilot for a new ABC game show called Carnival. By all accounts, the pilot was well-done, but it was never picked up as a series.

He was forced to leave Wonderama following the series' Christmas Day 1977 broadcast. In the fall of 1978, McAllister briefly returned to children's television as the host of ABC's Kids Are People Too, a show that took its name from the title of McAllister's closing Wonderama theme. However, the show that he was hired to emcee was aimed at teens, not children, and this led to creative disputes with the producers and network executives. In November 1978, Bob McAllister was fired from Kids Are People Too and he was replaced by Michael Young and later Randy Hamilton as the program's host.

== Later years ==
McAllister would spend the remainder of the 1970s and 1980s performing at corporate banquets and picnics and, for a time, was co-owner of a roller skating rink at The Mall in New Rochelle, New York.

He tried a return to children's television with an in-school educational program called Tuned In, produced by WNET for PBS in the early 1980s. He played the teacher Mr. Graff, who involved his pupils in television production. He made an appearance in the 1980s at The Galleria in White Plains, New York which ended with him singing the original Wonderama closing theme song, “Kids are People Too”.

He received recognition in the magic field with numerous awards, including the Magician of the Year Award from the Society of American Magicians.

== Death ==
McAllister died on July 21, 1998, of lung cancer at the age of 63.
