= Eastland Mall (Columbus, Ohio) =

Defunct mall in Columbus, OH

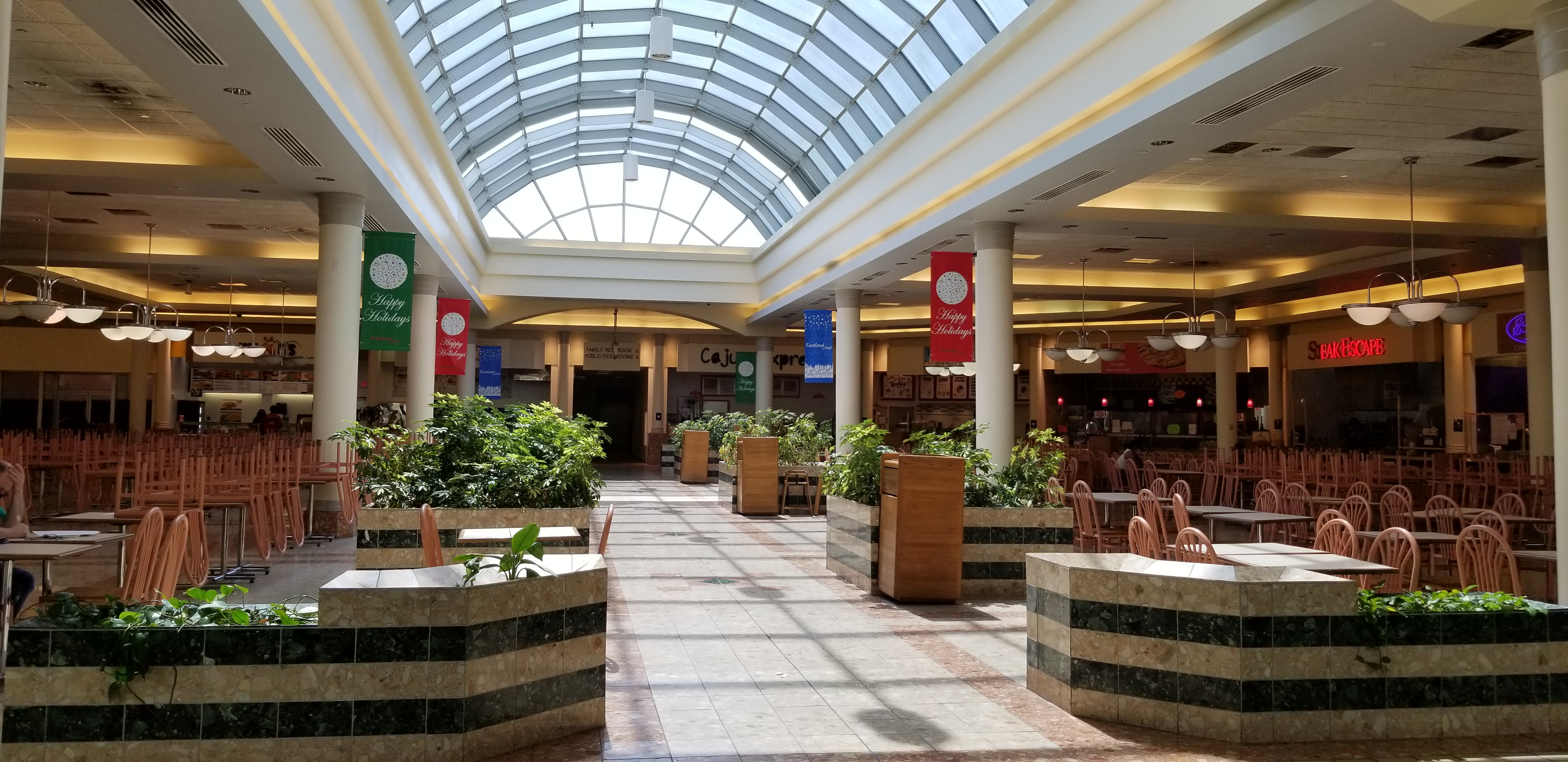
- Location: Columbus, Ohio
- Coordinates: 39°55′06″N 82°53′03″W
- Address: 2740 Eastland Mall Suite B
- Opened: February 14, 1968; 58 years ago
- Closed: December 27, 2022; 3 years ago
- Demolished: February 2025 (currently in progress)
- Developer: Richard E. Jacobs Group
- Manager: Eastland Mall Holdings LLC
- Owner: Eastland Mall Holdings LLC
- Num. of stores: 55 (at peak)
- Num. of anchor tenants: 4 (all vacant)
- Floor area: 999,458 square feet (92,852.7 m^{2})
- Floors: 1 (2 in former Sears, 3 in former JCPenney and former Lazarus.)
- Public transit: 5, 23, 24

Eastland Mall was a shopping mall in Columbus, Ohio. The mall opened February 14, 1968, closed on December 27, 2022, and demolition began in February 2025. There were 4 vacant anchor stores that were once Lazarus, JCPenney, Sears, and Macy's (built as Kaufmann's). The mall was owned and managed by Eastland Mall Holdings, LLC. Despite having no anchor stores, the mall's interior was until recently thriving with many smaller businesses and its food court, unusual for a mall lacking anchors and thus having enough tenants to keep it from being a dead mall. It would, however, later succumb to that fate.

== History ==
The mall was built in 1968 by Richard E. Jacobs Group, who also developed Columbus's Northland and Westland Malls. It was the first enclosed shopping mall in Columbus. As with the other two "directional" Jacobs malls in Columbus, Eastland's original anchors included J. C. Penney, Sears, and Lazarus.

Although Eastland itself was a single-story mall, all three of its original anchor stores were constructed with two stories of retail space. The Sears store closed off its upper level at some point during the 1980s.

With the closure and subsequent demolition of Northland in 2002, Eastland became the oldest shopping mall in the Columbus metro area.

The mall remained under Jacobs' ownership until Glimcher Realty Trust bought it in December 2003. The property became Glimcher's second mall in Columbus, following Polaris Fashion Place. Among Glimcher's first moves with the property was to add a fourth anchor, Kaufmann's. This Kaufmann's was the first in a "lifestyle" prototype featuring a smaller floor plan with wider aisles. The same year, the Lazarus store became Lazarus-Macy's. Macy's moved from the former Lazarus to the former Kaufmann's in 2006, when the Macy's chain purchased Kaufmann's then-parent company. Three years later, Glimcher proposed to demolish the former Lazarus-Macy's building for a new J. C. Penney, while dividing Penney's existing store among new tenants. However, as of 2013 the former Lazarus-Macy's building remains both standing and vacant.

Glimcher defaulted on the mall's mortgage loan in 2012 and turned the property over via a deed in lieu of foreclosure to the lender, a CMBS trust that was serviced by LNR Property, in August 2014.

=== Decline and eventual closing ===
Ever since the old Lazarus building closed down and was left vacant in 2006, the mall, and Hamilton Road corridor, began a steady decline, despite being a major shopping center up until the mid-2010s.

In March 2015, the mall was reportedly sold for $9.25 million. Earlier that year in January, JCPenney announced the closure of its existing store. It closed in May 2015.

On January 4, 2017, Macy's announced that its Eastland Mall store would close. The store closed in March 2017, leaving Sears as Eastland's only remaining anchor.

On June 6, 2017, Sears announced that its Eastland Mall store would close by early September, leaving the mall entirely without anchor stores.

Conditions at the mall declined drastically in its final years of operation, resulting in several health and safety code violations. In 2019, City Code Enforcement had begun issuing violations to Eastland Mall Holdings LLC for poor maintenance of the parking lot, structural issues, and zoning noncompliance. As these issues persisted and the mall continued to deteriorate, city officials had filed a case against Eastland Mall Holdings LLC in April 2021. In the court case held in June 2022, Eastland Mall LLC property manager Nihal Weerasinghe had admitted to various maintenance issues, including up to 1,200 potholes in the parking lot. On June 13, 2022, Judge Stephanie Mingo officially declared Eastland Mall a public nuisance and ordered the mall's owners to make repairs to bring Eastland to compliance. The case went back to court on September 22.

Eastland Mall was slated to close on December 31, 2022, but after a water line break flooded parts of the mall on December 26, the mall closed four days early. The City of Columbus began soliciting proposals to redevelop the Eastland area on March 3, 2023. Out of 13 applicants, the city on June 19 chose the company MKSK to redevelop Eastland and granted them $850,000.

Demolition of Eastland Mall began in February 2025.

The City of Columbus has been held in contempt of court regarding the Eastland Mall property. A Franklin County judge ruled that the city improperly approved a carnival on the site of the abandoned mall. Judge Stephanie Mingo noted that a carnival was seen taking place on the Hamilton Road property last week, despite a court order issued last year prohibiting any events there until further notice. In addition to the city, Judge Mingo also found the property’s two owners, IGWT and Eastland Mall Holdings, in contempt of court. "Perhaps most disturbing and most shocking to this court is that the City of Columbus Building and Zoning Department approved, approved and provided a permit for the carnival," Mingo said in court on Monday.

Scott Messer, the assistant director for the Department of Building and Zoning Services, released a statement on Monday: “We value our collaboration with the Environmental Court and Judge Mingo and it is never our intention to violate any court orders. We share the Court’s concern for the safety of the citizens of Columbus and the efforts to hold the owners of Eastland Mall and IGWT accountable for their property violations. We are taking steps internally to ensure this type of error does not happen again.”
