= The Falls (mall) =

Shopping center in Miami-Dade County, Florida, U.S.

Coordinates: 25.644718°N 80.338125°W

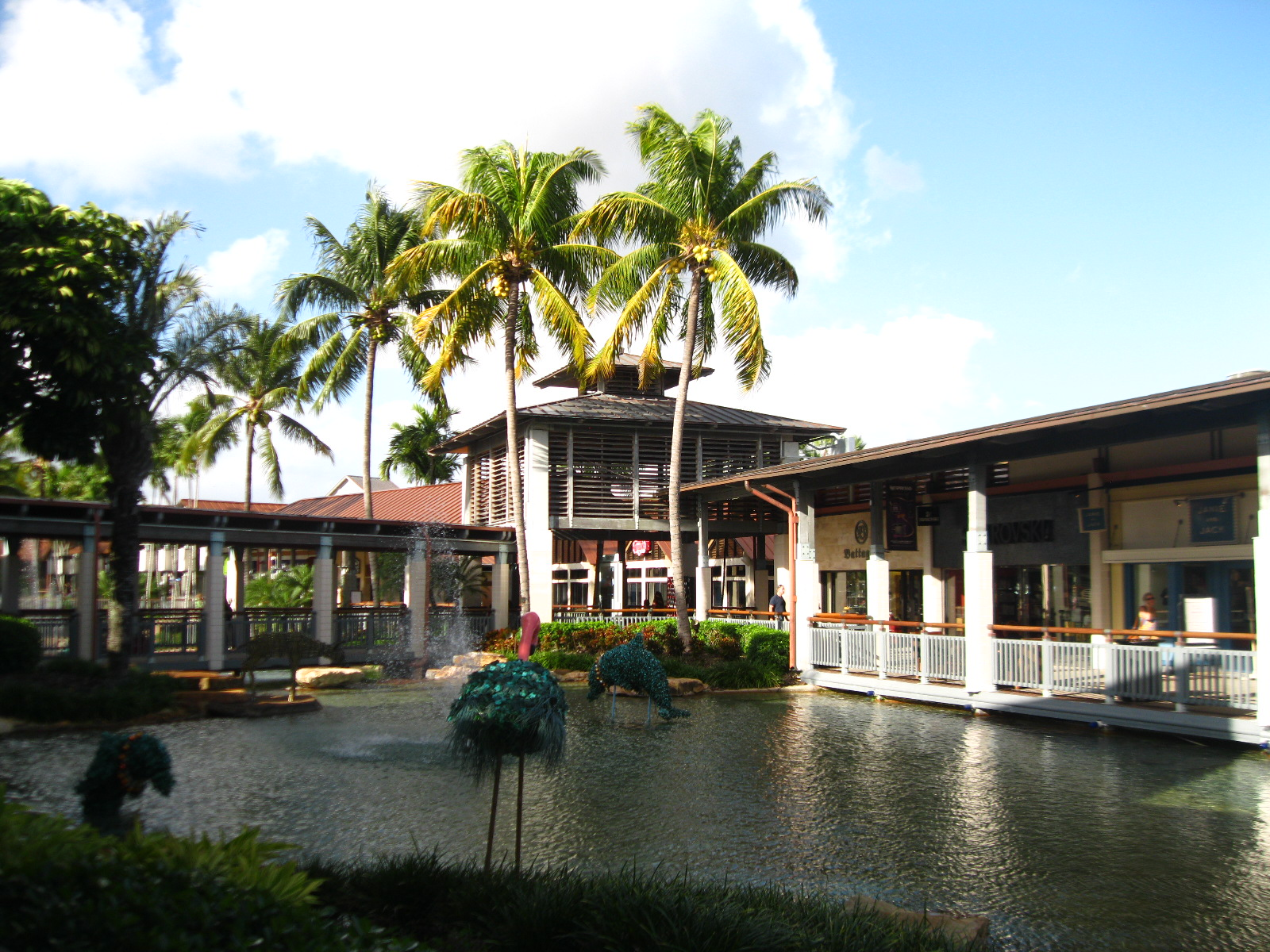
- The mall's waterfall in January 2014
- Location: Kendall, Florida, U.S.
- Address: 8888 SW 136th St; Miami, FL 33176
- Opened: 1980; 46 years ago
- Developer: The Rouse Company
- Manager: Simon Property Group
- Owner: Simon Property Group (50%); Farallon Capital Management (50%)
- Architect: M. Gerwing Architects
- Num. of stores: 110+ (at peak)
- Num. of anchor tenants: 2
- Floor area: 838,459 square feet (77,895.4 m^{2})
- Floors: 1 (3 in both anchors)
- Parking: Parking garage
- Website: www.simon.com/mall/the-falls

The Falls is an open-air shopping mall in Kendall, Florida. The mall has over 110 stores. The mall's anchor store is Macy's. Bloomingdale's was an anchor at this mall but closed on March 20, 2020, and it was replaced by Life Time Fitness center, which opened on August 4, 2023. The mall also features a movie theater, which is called Regal Bistro at The Falls, and is managed and 50% owned by Simon Property Group. The remaining shares are handled by Farallon Capital.

== History ==
Developed by the Columbia, Maryland-based Rouse Company and designed by M. Gerwing Architects, The Falls opened in 1980 as an upscale, open-air plaza. As its name implies, the center is designed around a lushly landscaped man-made lagoon featuring numerous pools, waterfalls and bridges accented with modern sculpture pieces and decorative lighting.

In April 1982, the first anchor store, Bloomingdale's, was announced, and had its grand opening on August 12, 1984. Bloomingdale's closed its two-story store temporarily in September 1992 after the store and the mall was severely damaged by Hurricane Andrew. It was repaired and later reopened in late 1993 as a three-story Bloomingdale's. The hurricane also damaged the UA Movies 7 at The Falls cinema, which reopened as a 12-screen cinema on January 27, 1994. Macy's opened at The Falls in October 1996 following a $61 million expansion in September that doubled the size of the shopping center by adding 54 stores.

In May 1997, The Rouse Co., which was converting into a real estate investment trust (REIT), announced that it would sell The Falls to Bloomfield Hills, Michigan-based Taubman Centers, which was completed in December of that year. Taubman then sold its ownership in ten shopping centers, including The Falls, to General Motors Pension Trust (GM Pension Trust) in August 1998. In May 2002, United Artists Theatre Circuit Inc., the parent company of the mall's movie theater, merged with Regal Cinemas and Edwards Theatres to form Regal Entertainment Group (REG); as a result, UA Movies 12 at The Falls was rebranded as Regal UA Falls 12. In August 2004, GM Pension Trust's shares of the mall were acquired by the Chevy Chase, Maryland-based Mills Corporation as part of a $1.03 billion deal. In April 2007, Simon Property Group and Farallon Capital Management acquired The Mills Corp. for $1.64 billion and subsequently assumed management of The Falls.

On January 6, 2020, Bloomingdale's parent company, Macy's, Inc., announced that it would permanently close its doors at The Falls on January 11 after over 30 years of operation. This left Macy's as the only anchor store at the mall. Two days after, Simon Property Group announced that the former Bloomingdale's building would be demolished and replaced with a Life Time Fitness resort center, originally expected to open in 2022. However, it opened on August 4, 2023. In May 2024, new stores were announced to open at the mall, including JD Sports, LoveSac, G by GUESS, Tous, and Lululemon. More stores were announced in late August 2024. By December 2025, the mall's Regal UA Falls movie theater was renovated and rebranded as Regal Bistro at The Falls.

== See also ==
- Sawgrass Mills
- Bayside Marketplace
- The Pointe at Harbour Island
- Aloha Tower Marketplace
- Columbus City Center
