= Westland Mall (Ohio) =

Demolished mall in Columbus, Ohio

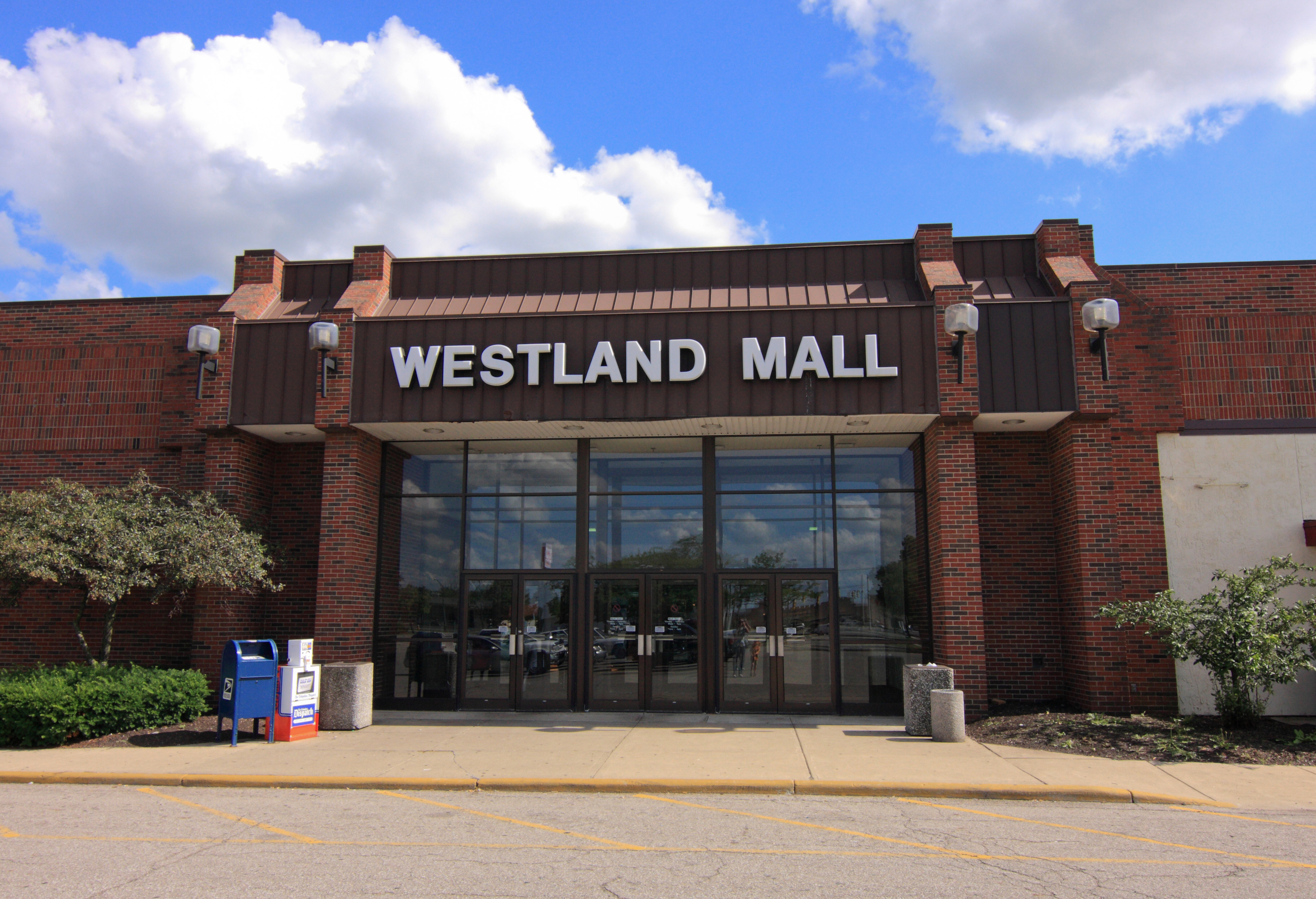
- Mall entrance in 2010
- Location: Columbus, Ohio, US
- Coordinates: 39°57′02″N 83°06′56″W
- Opened: February 1969; 57 years ago
- Closed: 2012; 14 years ago (mall interior); September 2017; 9 years ago (last remaining tenant)
- Demolished: August 2023–May 2024
- Developer: Richard E. Jacobs Group
- Manager: LGR Realty
- Owner: LGR Realty
- Num. of anchor tenants: 3 (at peak)
- Floor area: 860,000 ft^{2}
- Floors: 1 (2 in all anchors)

Westland Mall was a 860,000-square-foot (80,000 m^{2}) shopping center located at the intersection of U.S. Route 40 and Interstate 270 on the west side of Columbus, Ohio. In November 2012, the majority of the mall closed, and the last anchor closed in 2017. A mixed use development is planned, and demolition began around August 2023.

== History ==
On February 8, 1961, Nationwide Development Company announced it would build the Lincoln Center shopping mall next to the Nationwide Inn on West Broad Street. The mall would be anchored by Sears and Lazarus' first suburban store, and was expected to begin construction on September 1 and open in August 1962. Development of Lincoln Center was suspended shortly after the announcement, although a free-standing Lazarus location opened in 1962 as planned. A Big Bear supermarket meant for Lincoln Center instead opened at the nearby Lincoln Village Plaza shopping center on October 10, 1962.

Westland Mall opened in February 1969 as an open-air shopping center anchored by Lazarus, Sears, Penney's, and Woolworth. Sears and Penney's were built, along with the mall, from 1967 to 1969. A Sears auto center and appliance store, Harvest House Cafeteria, Merle Norman Cosmetics, and Andre Duval beauty salon opened in late 1968 before the rest of the mall.

From 1977 to 1980 it served as the studio for the groundbreaking teenage variety show, America Goes Bananaz on Columbus' experimental cable service QUBE.

In 1982, Westland was enclosed, and a north entryway was added with space for additional tenants. The upper floor of Sears was closed to customers and converted into office space for their in-house credit card, Discover, in October 1987. A Chi-Chi's restaurant opened at the mall's north entryway in the fall of 1987. Woolworth closed in January 1994 during the chain's restructuring process that resulted in the elimination of its 400 stores. It was renovated into a Staples with no concourse access and Footaction USA that faced the interior.

Westland was one of four directionally-named shopping centers in Columbus, along with Northland (the original mall in Columbus, closed in 2002 and demolished in 2004), Eastland (closed in 2022), and Southland (a smaller discount-style mall, now closed). All but Southland were constructed and originally operated by the Richard E. Jacobs Group, and featured the same mix of anchor stores.

=== Decline ===
Although considered a major landmark in the Columbus area, Westland Mall faced many challenges towards the end of the 20th century that would eventually see it lose its status as a premier shopping destination for the city's far west side. It was negatively affected by the opening of the nearby Mall at Tuttle Crossing in 1997, which attracted many customers that may have otherwise shopped at Westland. In particular, JCPenney abandoned Westland for Tuttle. Other major stores, such as Express and The Limited, also left Westland.

Kashani, a developer which also owned North Towne Square in Toledo, Ohio at the time, bought the mall in 2003 and attempted to reposition Westland as a "bazaar"-style mall with a number of specialty shops, which included a used bookstore, several arts and crafts dealers, and a karate school. The Lazarus store was converted to Lazarus-Macy's in 2003, and subsequently to Macy's in 2005 before closing in 2007. By that point virtually all of the newer stores added under Kashani ownership had also closed.

By 2010, Westland Mall contained fewer than 15 active businesses. The only remaining national retailers were Sears, Finish Line, Champs Sports, GNC, and Staples. The remainder of operating storefronts were small, bazaar-style shops, eateries, and a local branch of the Franklin County Sheriff's office.

Sears closed its entrance to the mall in September 2011.

=== Future plans ===
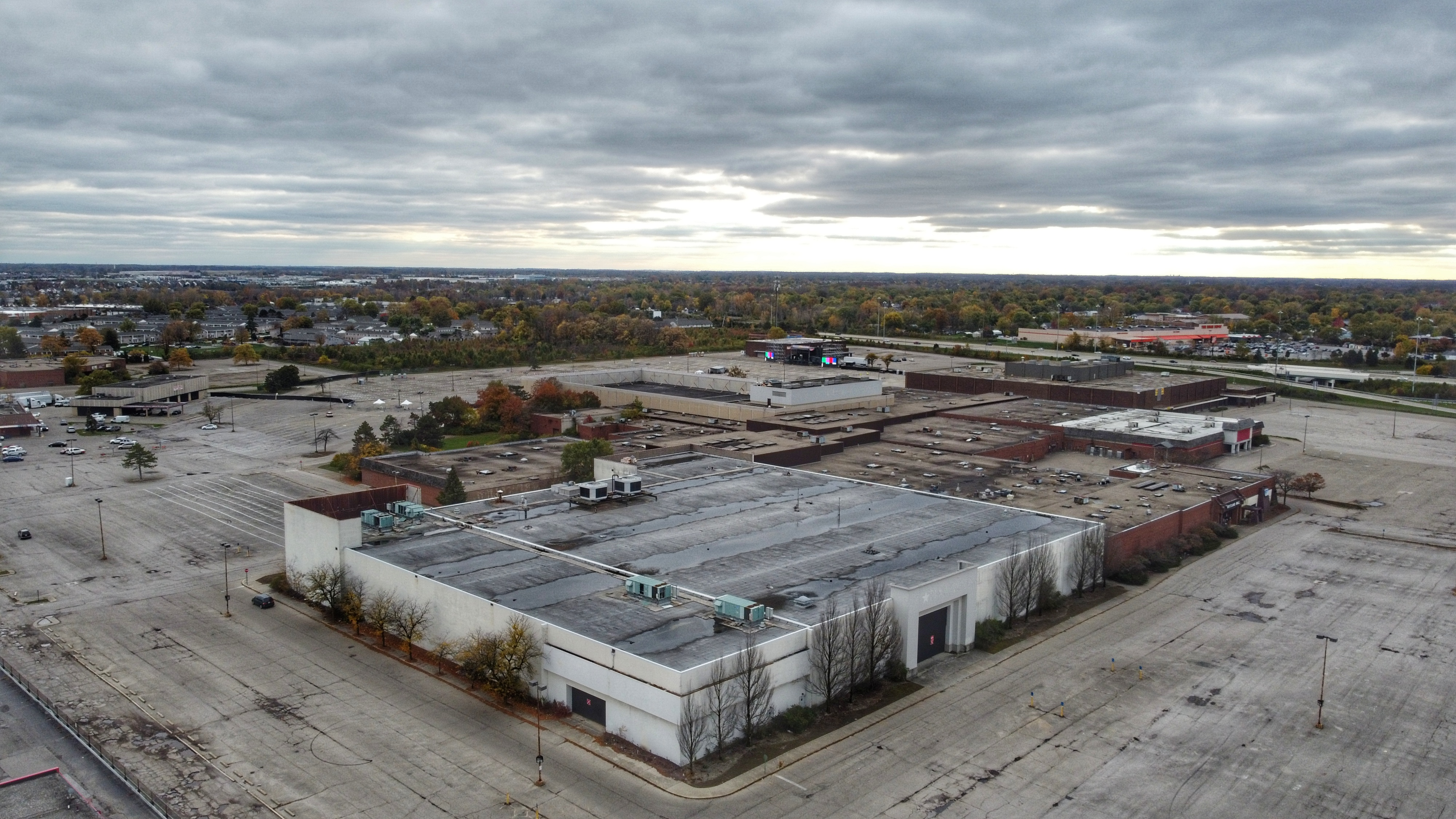
Aerial view, 2020

In 2008, home-improvement retailer Menards made plans to expand into the Columbus market at Westland Mall, which would have been redeveloped into an open-air shopping center. But Menards announced later in the year that its expansion plans were being put on hold because of a general economic downturn at that time.

In 2012, a new Hollywood Casino was constructed and opened near the site of Westland Mall, spurring new growth in the surrounding area that had become economically depressed. Plans were announced in March to begin demolishing the mall, except for Sears, in favor of a new shopping center.

On June 6, 2017, Sears announced that its Westland store would close by early September, leaving the mall entirely empty of tenants.

The Sears portion of the lot, including the auto center just south of the main shopping building, were sold to LGR Weston in April 2019. On April 26, 2019, plans were announced to redevelop the Westland Mall site by LGR Weston of Columbus, which will become Weston Town Centre, a mixed-use development complement to the casino across the street and whose namesake is partly derived from the Easton Town Center on the opposite side of the city. LGR's sister company, Plaza Properties, is expected to demolish the mall before the end of Spring 2020. The former JCPenney store was used for community events hosted by the mall, including about six gun shows per year, which have now moved to the former Sears building. The property is under 24-hour surveillance by on-site security.

In February 3, 2023, Ohio Governor Mike DeWine announced $20,000,000+ for the revitalization of the area. Demolition began in June 2023.

The Macy's building was fully demolished in August 2023, and asbestos removal at the building took place the following month. Demolition of the Westland Mall continued into October of that year. C&E Gunshows' contract with LGR Weston expired in December 2023, and the Sears building was demolished in May 2024. The Sears Auto Center, NTB, and JCPenney structures were left standing as part of LGR's redevelopment plans. The Sears Auto Center was demolished in 2024.
