= Columbus City Center =

Defunct mall in Ohio, U.S.

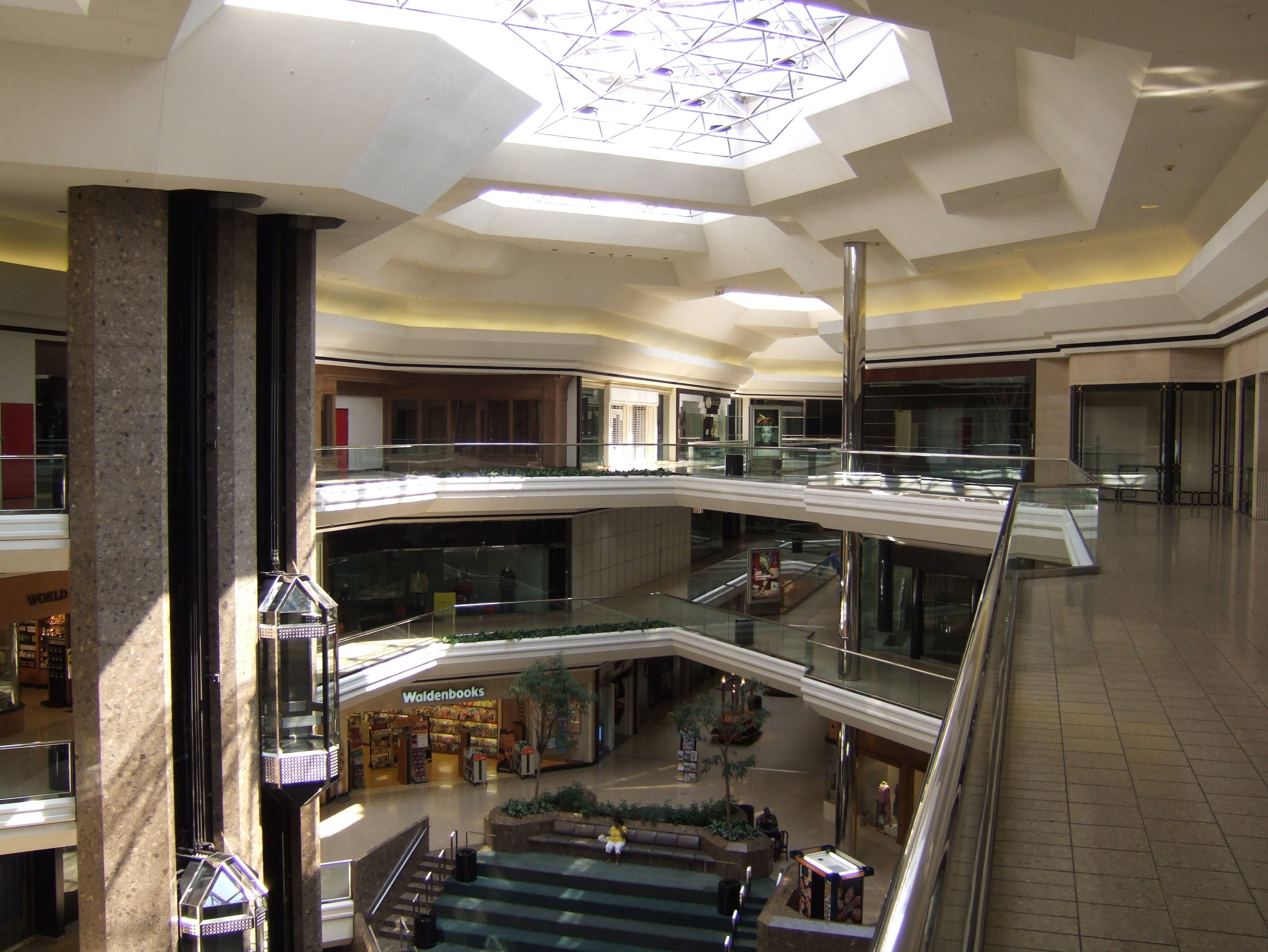
- Central atrium in August 2007
- Location: Columbus, Ohio, U.S.
- Coordinates: 39.95901°N 82.99869°W
- Opened: August 18, 1989; 37 years ago
- Closed: March 5, 2009; 17 years ago
- Demolished: October 2009–March 2010
- Developer: Taubman Centers
- Owner: City of Columbus
- Num. of stores: 144 (at peak)
- Num. of anchor tenants: 3 (at peak)
- Floor area: 1,250,000 sq ft (116,000 m^{2})
- Floors: 3

Columbus City Center (known locally as City Center) was a 1,250,000 sq ft (116,000 m^{2}), three-level shopping mall in Columbus, Ohio. It was located in the city's downtown, near the Ohio Statehouse, next to the Ohio Theatre, and connected to the Hyatt on Capitol Square hotel. At the time of its opening, City Center was Central Ohio's largest shopping mall. The mall closed and was demolished in 2009. The mall had a large adjacent parking structure attached that remains in use. The parking structure has been joined, directly or via bridge respectively, to two 12 story structures, 250 S. High Street (completed in January 2016) and 80 on the Commons (80 East Rich Street), both of which feature lower level office spaces with residential spaces on the upper floors.

== History ==
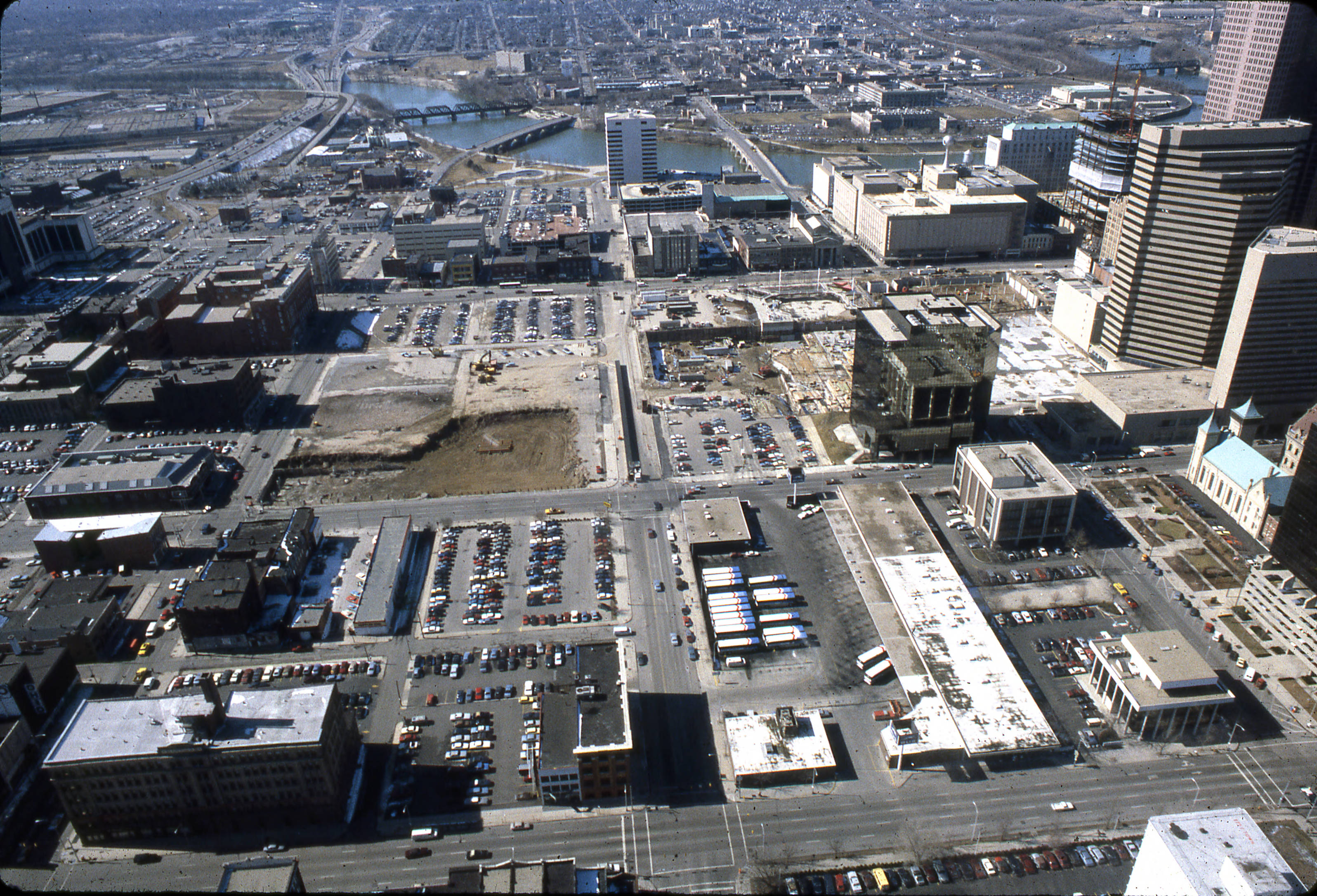
Early construction for the mall, 1987

Columbus City Center was developed by the city as part of the Capitol South development, opening on August 18, 1989 with 135 in-line stores, and 3 anchors. Lazarus, already open since 1851, was made one of the original anchor stores by connecting it with the mall via an enclosed bridge across High Street. The Lazarus store by City Center was the flagship Lazarus store. The other original anchor stores were Marshall Field's and Jacobson's. Taubman Centers leased and managed the building until control was later taken over by The Mills Corporation. Early leasing efforts were substantially enhanced when Limited Brands (now known as L Brands), a locally based dominant specialty retailer, announced that all of its brands would have a presence at the center.

In 2003, the Marshall Field's store became a Kaufmann's. It was later rebranded as Macy's following the Federated-May merger of 2005.

=== Decline and closure ===
During its last decade of operation, City Center's positioning as the premier shopping destination in Columbus was eliminated, due primarily to the opening of the three shopping centers across the northern end of Columbus, and the closing of its key anchor tenants. At the mall's peak in 1992, it had 144 tenants occupying 1,250,000 square feet (116,000 m^{2}) of retail space; just 17 years later, in 2009, there were only eight small stores open for business, occupying 5,000 square feet (460 m^{2}).

==== Competition from new shopping centers (1997-2002) ====
In July 1997, The Mall at Tuttle Crossing opened on the northwest side of Columbus. The developers of City Center also built Tuttle. Though its opening had a much more devastating effect on the nearby Westland Mall, Tuttle presented an attractive alternative for upscale shoppers in the surrounding area who would have otherwise shopped at City Center. However, Tuttle alone did not have the capacity to decimate City Center, as City Center was still a convenient destination for wealthy residents in eastside suburbs such as Bexley, Pickerington, New Albany, and others, although the opening of Easton Town Center in June 1999 dramatically changed that and the overall outlook on shopping centers in Columbus.

Located near the intersection of the I-270 Outerbelt, I-670, and SR-161 in northeast Columbus, Easton Town Center presented a unique mixed-use format that was successful. The combination of Easton and Tuttle gave most wealthy suburban shoppers throughout Columbus more convenient shopping options. In conjunction to driving significant retail traffic away from downtown, Easton also hastened the downfall of nearby Northland Mall.

To make matters worse for City Center, Glimcher Realty Trust opened Polaris Fashion Place in October 2001. The mall was built on the far northern end of Columbus to capture the corridor of suburban development in the Columbus suburbs of Powell and Worthington, as well as the rapid population growth in nearby Delaware and Union counties. With this trifecta of new shopping centers across the wealthy northern end of Columbus, tenants fled City Center and Northland Mall, which closed in 2002.

==== Loss of anchor tenants ====
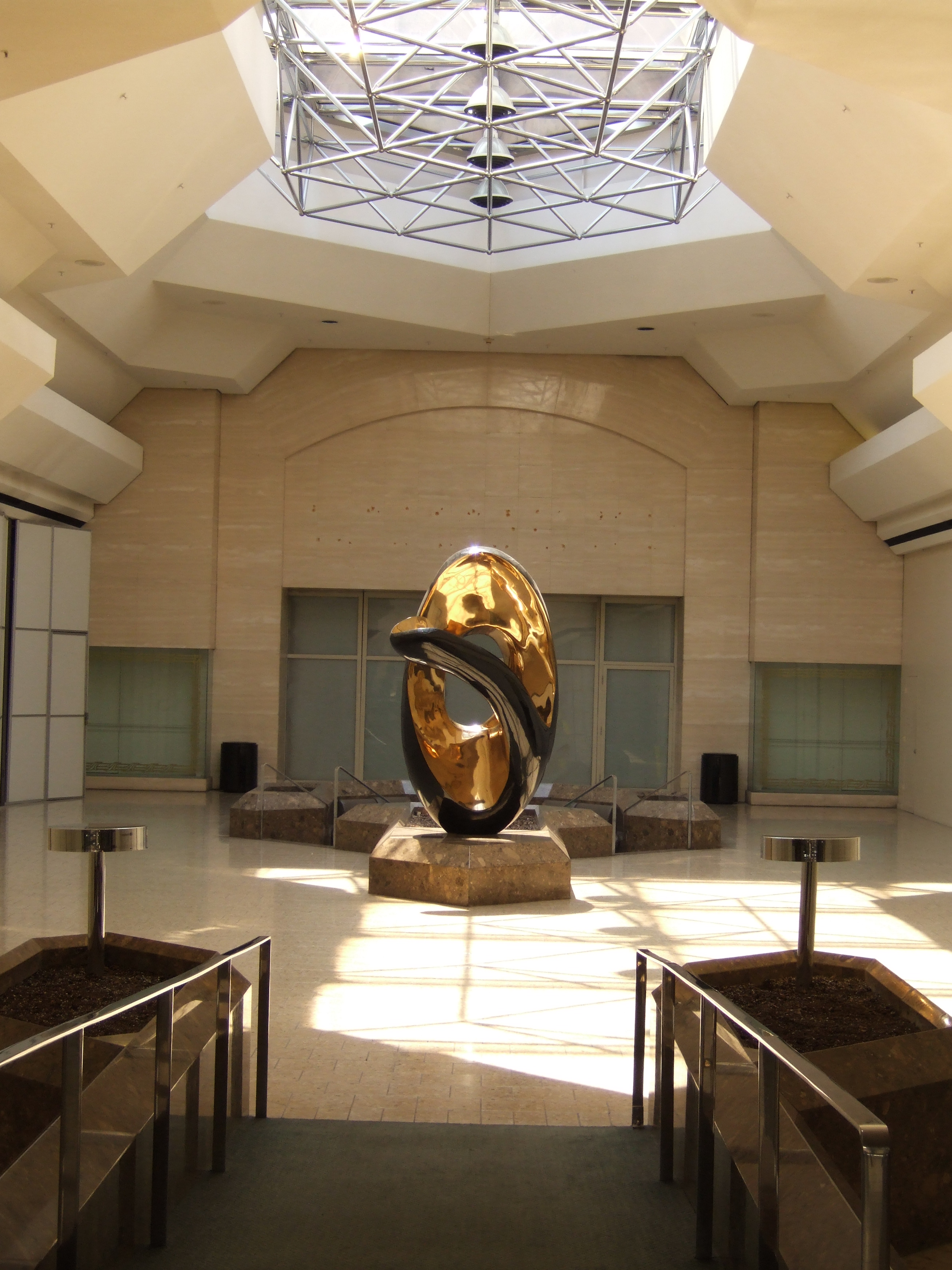
Sculpture in front of what was the entrance to Lazarus, on City Center's third floor.

In the face of competition from new shopping centers, City Center lost two key anchor tenants over the next few years. Jacobson's went bankrupt in 2002 and closed all of its stores, creating the first hole in City Center's anchor lineup. Lazarus, after 153 years of tenancy in downtown Columbus, closed in mid-2004. This left City Center with just one anchor, Kaufmann's, which was about to be rebranded as Macy's. Declining sales at the City Center location prompted Macy's closure in late November 2007.

==== Final days ====
Shortly after the Lazarus closing, The Mills Corporation of Chevy Chase, Maryland, through a 50/50 partnership with General Motors (operating as GM Pension Trust), purchased a large portion of Taubman's holdings, including Tuttle and City Center. Mills, with extensive experience in converting aged malls into revitalized structures emphasizing fresh entertainment and dining options, was seen by many to be the new hope for City Center's future. However, excitement quickly faded as Mills announced significant financial difficulties in 2006, including accounting irregularities and earnings restatements going back several years. Many of its new and redevelopment projects were either put on hold or discontinued. By February 2007, a bidding war developed between Brookfield Asset Management and Simon Property Group, in conjunction with Farallon Capital Management, for control of Mills' assets. Simon won and assumed ownership of Mills' assets in Columbus, including City Center.

Around this time, the development arm of Nationwide Insurance (parent company of Nationwide Realty Investors, both based in Columbus, and responsible for much of the Arena District development) stepped up on behalf of the City of Columbus to put together a plan for the mall's future if Simon were to abandon the center.

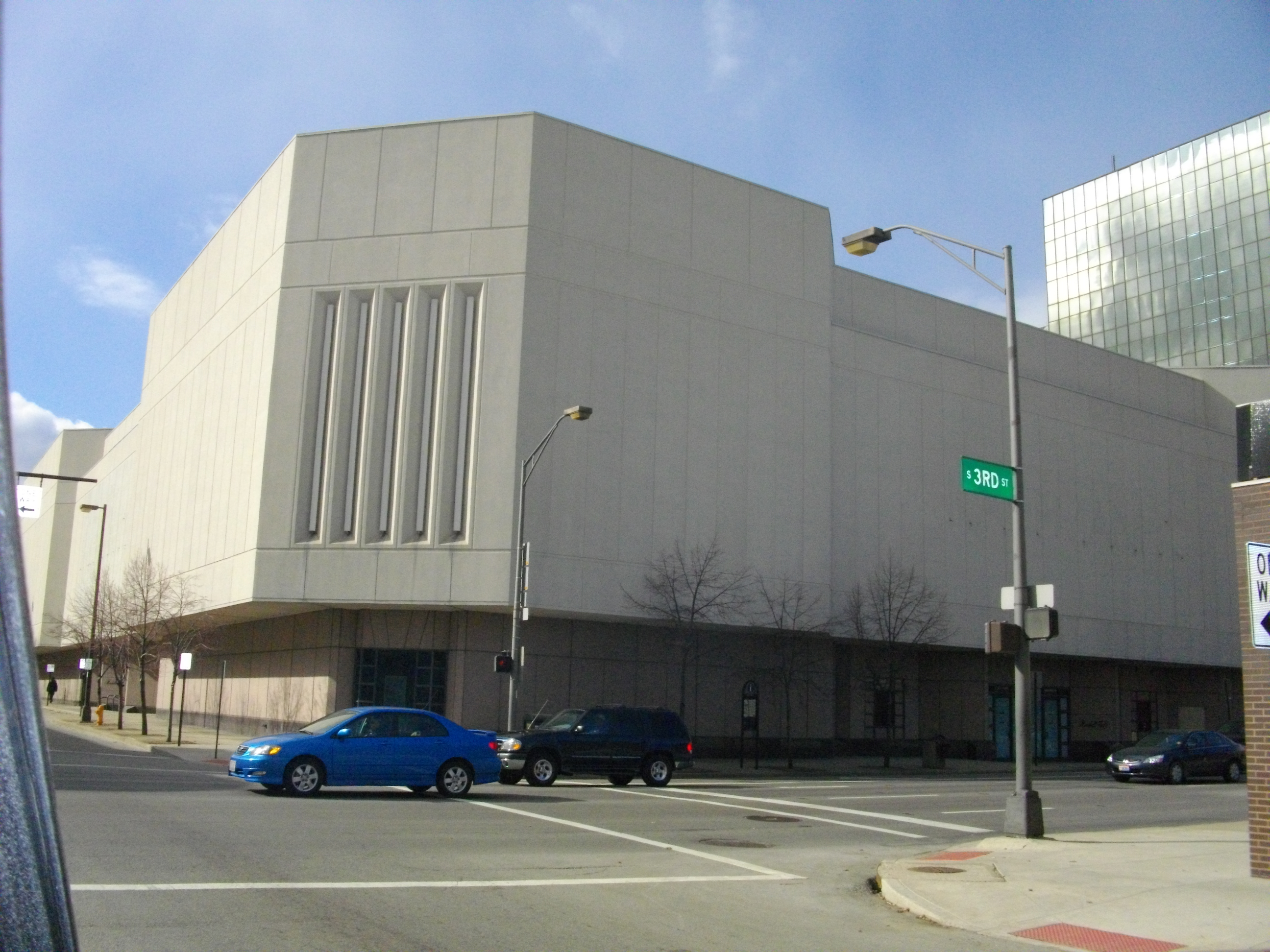
The former Marshall Field's/Kaufmann's/Macy's anchor store at Columbus City Center (February 2009)

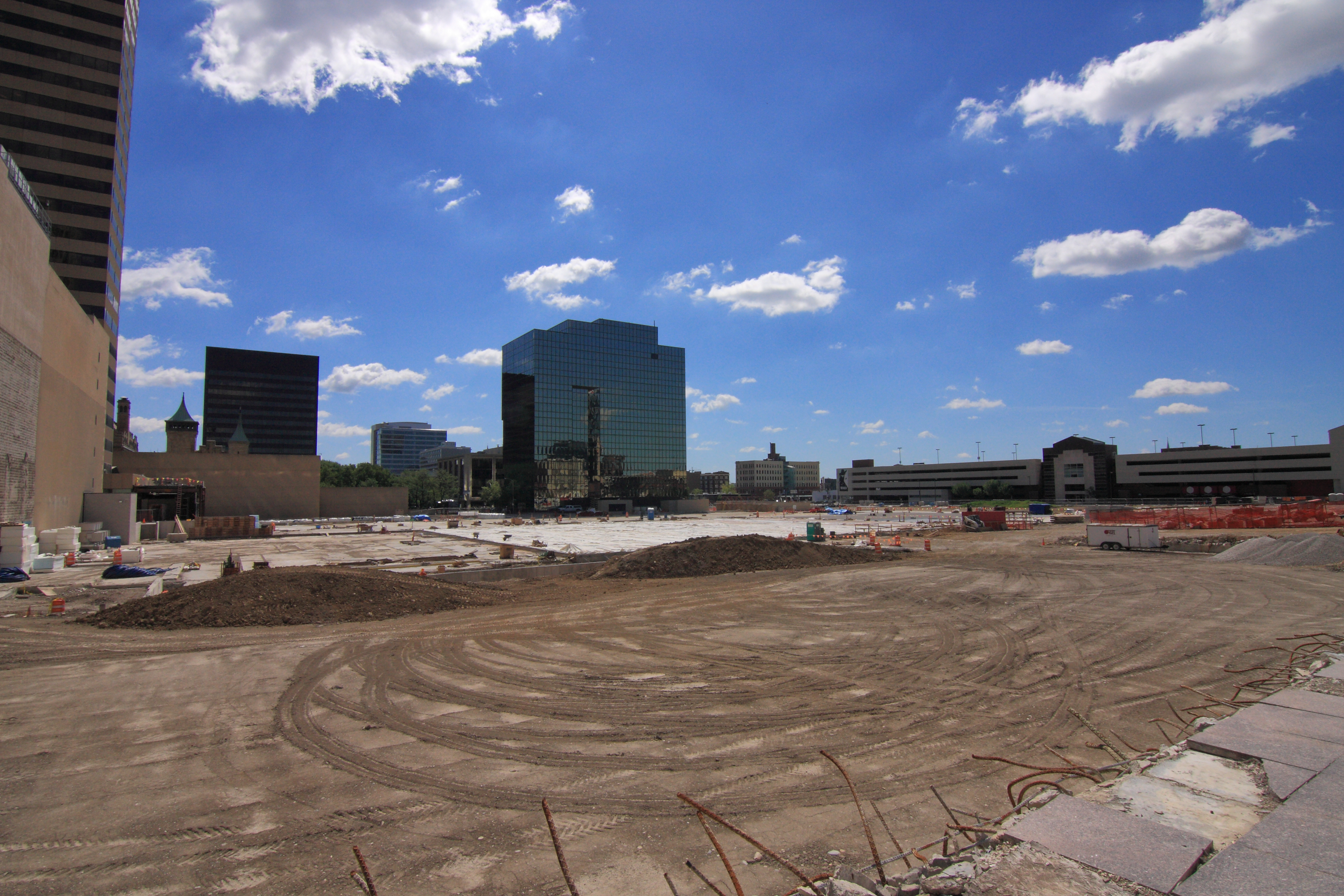
After demolition, 2010

On July 31, 2007, the City of Columbus filed a lawsuit to evict the management company, Simon Property Group, which held the lease on the underlying land, to gain control of the mall. The city alleged that mall management grossly neglected the property, allowed it to fall into disrepair, did not pay real estate taxes for some time, and failed to make a rent payment for the land in excess of $200,000. Columbus Mayor Michael Coleman said of possible redevelopment for the property, "I have many, many ideas, I want to see some retail back in it, offices as well. We have thousands of people moving downtown and there's a great need for retail activity. Our downtown is on the move. This is the only thing holding us back.". In the last minutes before eviction was to take place, the city was able to negotiate a purchase agreement to buy the property from Simon and take over full control.

Two recent developments have set the stage for what could potentially revitalize the area surrounding City Center. First is the pronounced downtown housing boom, which has brought many young professionals back to the city. Several vacant buildings have been converted into condos, and the nearby German Village continues to show strong growth. Second, and more immediate, is the substantial redevelopment of the vacant Lazarus building. The redevelopment, now complete, converted the building to a format suitable for office space, academic research, arts, and dining.

On February 3, 2009, Columbus Mayor Michael Coleman announced that Columbus City Center would close on March 5, and be torn down by the following summer. The parking garage that was constructed for City Center remained, as did its underground parking area, but the mall was demolished.

The last retail business to operate in the mall, and also an original tenant from when the mall opened in 1989, was a franchise of Mark Pi's Express, which closed on February 27, 2009.

The mall was officially closed to all pedestrian traffic on Thursday March 5, 2009. Demolition of the mall began on approximately October 1, 2009, and was completed in March 2010. Demolition was by S.G. Loewendick & Sons.

=== Redevelopment as Columbus Commons ===
The mall was replaced by Columbus Commons, a 9-acre (36,000 m^{2}) park and green space. The park features gardens, a performance stage, a carousel, a reading room and a café. The $20 million project was developed by CDDC and Capitol South, private, non-profit development organizations.
