= Northland Mall =

Defunct shopping mall in Columbus, Ohio

- Location: Columbus, Ohio, United States
- Coordinates: 40.058341°N 82.973009°W
- Opened: 1964; 62 years ago (enclosed 1975)
- Closed: October 31, 2002; 24 years ago
- Demolished: February 2004
- Developer: Richard E. Jacobs Group
- Manager: Richard E. Jacobs Group and Cigna Investments
- Owner: Richard E. Jacobs Group and Cigna Investments
- Num. of anchor tenants: 3
- Floors: 1 (2 in Sears and JCPenney, 3 in Lazarus)

Northland Mall was a shopping mall located on the north side of Columbus, Ohio, at the intersection of Morse Road and Karl Road. It opened in 1964 as an open-air shopping center. Northland was the first of the four directionally-named shopping hubs in Columbus, along with Eastland, Westland, and Southland (a small strip center, now closed). Though popular through the 1990s, three new shopping centers were completed in the late 1990s and early 2000s that took businesses and shoppers away from Northland. It closed in 2002 and was demolished in 2004. The site has subsequently been redeveloped as Northland Village, a multi-use complex containing government offices, retail stores and the Franklin County Dog Shelter and Adoption Center.

== History ==
=== Opening and Success (1964-1989) ===
Northland was one of the first large-scale shopping malls to open in the Columbus metropolitan area, and remained the only one until 1967, when Eastland was constructed near the suburb of Whitehall. Its original two anchors were Lazarus and Sears, plus junior anchors F. W. Woolworth Co. and The Union. From the time of its opening through the decade of the 1980s, it was one of the most popular and upscale shopping destinations in Columbus, drawing in customers from the affluent northern suburbs of the city.

Jacobs, Visconsi & Jacobs Co. enclosed the Northland Mall between March 20, 1974 and June 1, 1975; the mall held a grand enclosure celebration on June 12, 1975. A south concourse was added in fall 1979, leading towards a JCPenney which opened in January 1980, replacing a smaller location at the Northern Lights Shopping Center. The Union was converted to Halle's in 1980, then closed in 1982; Casa Gallardo (closed in 1986 and replaced by Foot Locker), Limited Express, and a few other stores were built in the former Halle's space.

An 8-screen General Cinema movie theater opened outside the mall on December 11, 1985; American Eagle Outfitters and Gantos were built in the previous Northland Cinema location. The main mall's facade was updated in late 1988, adding a new entrance.

=== Competition From Surrounding Malls and Early Decline (1989-1999) ===
During the 1990s, however, the mall began a steady decline caused by the introduction of newer shopping options in the Greater Columbus area. The first new mall in the area in 20 years, the downtown Columbus City Center, opened in 1989 and included several tenants that were unique in the Columbus area (among them Marshall Field's and Jacobson's), which took some business from Northland. However, it remained popular with shoppers in the northern half of Columbus and continued to be an attractive destination for those who found City Center's downtown location (and paid parking) a hindrance. In addition, a food court was added in the spring of 1995, replacing the Woolworths that had vacated the previous year.

The opening of The Mall at Tuttle Crossing in 1997 was the first major hit to Northland. It could not match the capacity of Tuttle, which was a larger two-level mall with four anchor stores (including all three of Northland's anchors, plus a Marshall Field's). The opening of Tuttle was far more devastating to Westland Mall, as JCPenney moved from Westland to Tuttle, but nonetheless attracted shoppers from the nearby suburbs of Powell and Dublin who would have otherwise gone to Northland.

=== Sharp Decline and Closure (1999-2002) ===
Two years later in 1999, Easton Town Center opened in northeastern Columbus—just five miles away from Northland—as a mixed-use "lifestyle center" that further drew shoppers and businesses away, and the older facility (along with the Morse Road corridor itself) began to go into sharp decline.

The following year, in June 2000, Polaris Fashion Place, a new mall that eventually opened in Fall 2001, began construction. Before construction on the mall began, owner Richard E. Jacobs said that Northland would be doomed if Polaris was built. with the mall having been in steep decline for at least a year. When Polaris opened, it was an even worse hit to Northland's fortunes than Easton's opening, proven by all three anchors (Lazarus, Sears, and JCPenney) pulling out of the dying mall and relocated to the newly constructed Polaris Fashion Place.. JCPenney announced its departure first, followed by Lazarus, then Sears.

Although Northland would remain open, it had been reduced to the status of a bazaar-type mall with only a small handful of specialty shops in operation, which that dwindled throughout 2002, 12 stores closing in January alone. Finally, on October 31, 2002, after 38 years of service in Columbus, Northland Mall closed permanently. The mall concourse and the vacant Sears anchor were demolished in February 2004.

After redevelopment as what is now known as Northland Village, the only parts of Northland Mall that remain are two of its anchor stores: the former Lazarus, which was converted to offices for the Ohio Department of Taxation; and the former JCPenney, which was extensively rebuilt to contain the headquarters of the Franklin County Department of Job and Family Services as well as the Northland Performing Arts Center, home to a local theater group (Vaud-Villities) and other events and activities. A Menards home improvement store now lies on the site of the former Sears, and the Franklin County Dog Shelter and Adoption Center moved to the former location of a multiplex movie theater on the site. A new 102,000 square foot (9,500 m^{2}) Kroger grocery store was built in the area that was formerly the central concourse of the mall; it was completed in October 2016.
