= Jay Will =

Jay Will may refer to:

- Jay T. Will, American martial artist
- Jay Will (actor), American actor, rapper and musician
