= McCoy Center =

Office in Columbus, Ohio

The McCoy Center
- Interactive map of the The McCoy Center area

General information
- Status: Completed
- Type: Office
- Location: 1111 Polaris Parkway, Columbus, OH 43240; Columbus
- Coordinates: 40°8′28″N 82°59′50″W
- Opening: 1996
- Cost: $242 million

Technical details
- Floor area: 2,000,000 sq ft (185,800 m^{2})

The McCoy Center is an office building located in Columbus, Ohio. The building was acquired by JPMorgan Chase & Co. with its 2004 merger with Bank One Corporation. Formally known as the Corporate Center Columbus (or more often and colloquially "Polaris"), the building was renamed after the merger to honor the McCoy family, who led the Columbus-based Bank One for three generations. Inside is a gift shop, Starbucks, Which Wich?, Saladworks, recreational game room, shipping center, car rental, nurse's station, daycare, health & wellness center, one cafeteria, a bistro, multiple Chase automated teller machines, and a personal banker. The building is located off Polaris Parkway, home of the Polaris Fashion Place mall.

The facility—¼ mile from end to end—houses approximately 13,000 employees in a space equal in square footage to the Empire State Building. With four floors and 2 million square feet (190,000 m^{2}), it is the largest JPMorgan Chase & Co. facility in the world, the largest office building in the Columbus, Ohio area, and the second largest single-tenant office building in the United States behind The Pentagon, from which the McCoy Center has borrowed its way-finding system. Only a handful of office buildings in the U.S. - the 5.7 million-square-foot Warren G. Magnuson Health Sciences Building in Seattle and the 4.4 million-square-foot McDermott Building in San Antonio among them - are bigger. The parking lot features solar panels over many of the 9,000 parking spots which can supply enough power for roughly 75 percent of the building.

In 2017, Chase began a $200 million renovation of the facility. The renovation was completed in 2023.
