= Starfield Hanam =

- 스타필드하남
- Location: Hanam, Gyeonggi Province, South Korea
- Address: 750 Misadaero, Hanam
- Opened: 9 September 2016 (10 years ago)
- Developer: Taubman Centers and Shinsegae Group
- Owner: Hanam Union Square
- Num. of stores: 750+
- Floor area: 459,498 m^{2} (4,946,000 sq ft)
- Floors: 4
- Parking: 6,200

Starfield Hanam is shopping complex in Hanam, Gyeonggi Province, South Korea. It is the second largest shopping mall in South Korea.
