= Polaris Founder's Park =

Park in Columbus, Ohio, U.S.

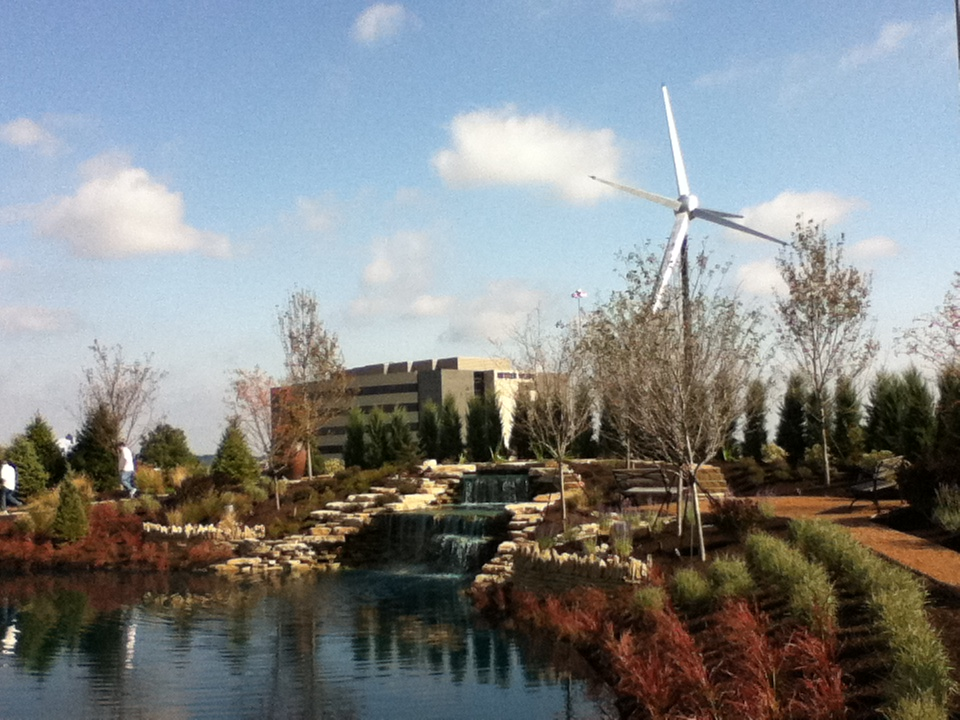
- A View from inside the park with 8800 Lyra in the background.
- Interactive map of Polaris Founder's Park
- Type: Privately owned; open to the public
- Location: Columbus Ohio
- Coordinates: 40°08′40″N 82°58′19″W
- Area: 1.5 acres (0.61 ha)
- Created: October 3, 2011
- Operator: POLARIS Centers of Commerce

Polaris Founder's Park is a pocket park in the Polaris area of Columbus (Delaware County), Ohio, United States. The 1.5-acre (0.61 ha) park is located between the office building at 8800 Lyra Drive and Interstate 71.

The park was built as a memorial to Robert C. Echele of the company Polaris Centers of Commerce who was inspirational in developing the 1,200-acre (490 ha) Polaris area. The park features a wind sculpture 35 feet (11 m) high that was designed by Robert Mullins, a Columbus area artist who counted Mr. Echele as a friend and benefactor. The park, developed at a cost of US$500,000, features a gazebo as well as Japanese-inspired gardens, waterfalls and a pond.

== See also ==
- List of parks in Columbus, Ohio
