= Taubman Realty Group =

Defunct real estate investment trust

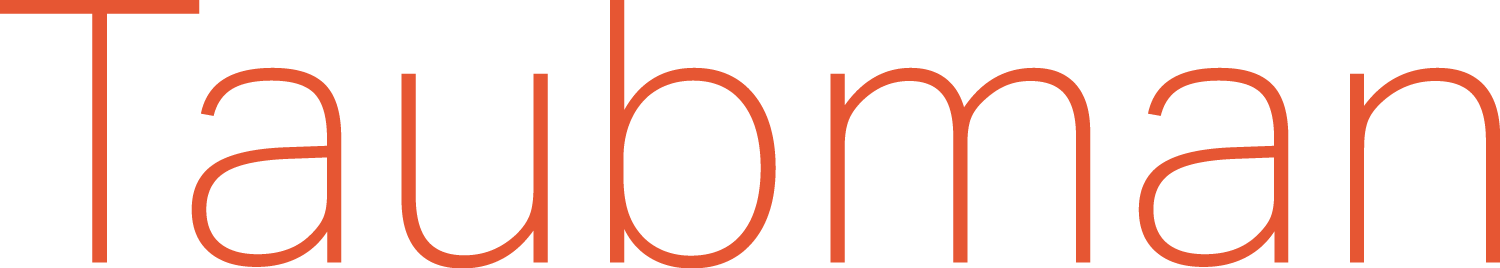
- Formerly: Taubman Company (1950–1973); Taubman Centers, Inc. (1973–2020)
- Type: Subsidiary
- Traded as: NYSE: TCO (1992-2020); S&P 400 component (until 2020)
- Industry: Real estate investment trust
- Founded: 1950; 76 years ago
- Founder: A. Alfred Taubman
- Defunct: November 3, 2025; 9 months ago
- Fate: Acquired by Simon Property Group
- Successor: Simon Property Group
- Headquarters: Bloomfield Hills, Michigan, U.S.
- Area served: North America; Asia
- Key people: Robert S. Taubman (chairman); William S. Taubman (COO)
- Products: Shopping malls
- Revenue: ▲$661 million (2019)
- Net income: ▲$330 million (2019)
- Total assets: ▲$4.515 billion (2019)
- Total equity: ▲ -$177 million (2019)
- Number of employees: 420 (2019)
- Parent: Simon Property Group (2020–2025)
- Website: Official website at the Wayback Machine (archived December 18, 2025)

Taubman Realty Group, formerly Taubman Centers, was an American real estate investment trust headquartered in Bloomfield Hills, Michigan. The company invested in shopping centers, and became a subsidiary of Simon Property Group in 2020. Simon completed a full buyout of the company in November 2025.

== History ==
The company was founded in 1950 by A. Alfred Taubman. In 1953, it opened its first shopping center, North Flint Plaza, in Flint, Michigan. In 1964, the company opened its first enclosed mall, Southland Mall, in Hayward, California. In 1973, the company was incorporated as Taubman Centers, Inc. In 1987, the company sold Southridge Mall, in Milwaukee County, Wisconsin. In 1992, the company became a public company via an initial public offering. In 1997, the company sold Queens Center to Macerich. In 1998, the company sold The Mall at Tuttle Crossing, Hilltop Mall, Marley Station, Meadowood Mall, Lakeforest Mall, Briarwood Mall, Stoneridge Shopping Center, The Falls Mall, and Columbus City Center to GM Pension Trust. The company continued to manage the properties until 2003 when they were sold again.

In 2000, the company traded Lakeside Mall Rodamco for full ownership of Twelve Oaks. In 2003, Simon Property Group attempted to acquire the company via a hostile takeover. In 2011, the company transferred The Pier Shops at Caesars to its lenders. In January 2012, Regency Square in Richmond, Virginia, was surrendered to creditors to avoid foreclosure. In January 2014, the company sold Arizona Mills and land for the proposed The Mall at Oyster Bay to Simon Property Group. In October 2014, the company sold The Mall at Partridge Creek, MacArthur Center, Northlake Mall, The Mall at Wellington Green, Stony Point Fashion Park, The Shops at Willow Bend, and Fairlane Town Center to Starwood Capital Group. In April 2015, the founder, Alfred Taubman, died at the age of 91. In March 2016, in a joint venture with Macerich, the company acquired Country Club Plaza in Kansas City, Missouri, for $660 million. In October 2020, Taubman sold Stamford Town Center for $20 million. In April 2024, Olshan Properties took ownership of Fair Oaks Mall from Taubman, securing long-term extension. In July 2024, the company along with Macerich sold Country Club Plaza to Dallas-based HP Village Partners.

In February 2020, the company agreed to be acquired by Simon Property Group. This would have ended family control but the Taubman family will retain an ownership stake in its malls. In June 2020, Simon announced that it terminated the merger agreement with Taubman, before reversing its decision and modifying certain terms of the original merger agreement, including a modified purchase price of $43.00 per share in cash in November 2020. The merger closed in December 2020.

== Investments ==
As of September 2024, the company owned interests in 22 shopping centers in 9 U.S. states, Puerto Rico, South Korea, and China.

The company's largest tenants include Forever 21, The Gap, H&M, L Brands, Williams Sonoma, Urban Outfitters, Ascena Retail Group, Abercrombie & Fitch, Inditex, and Foot Locker.

Notable properties owned by the company include:

- Beverly Center - Los Angeles, California
- Cherry Creek Shopping Center - Denver, Colorado
- City Creek Center - Salt Lake City, Utah
- Dolphin Mall - Miami, Florida
- Great Lakes Crossing Outlets - Auburn Hills, Michigan
- International Plaza and Bay Street - Tampa, Florida
- Mall at Green Hills - Nashville, Tennessee
- The Mall at Millenia - Orlando, Florida (50% equity stake, managed by The Forbes Company)
- The Mall at Short Hills - Short Hills, New Jersey
- The Mall at University Town Center - Sarasota, Florida
- The Mall of San Juan - San Juan, Puerto Rico
- Miami Worldcenter - Miami, Florida
- Sunvalley Shopping Center - Concord, California
- Twelve Oaks Mall - Novi, Michigan
- Waterside Shops - Naples, Florida (50% equity stake, managed by The Forbes Company)
- Westfarms - West Hartford, Connecticut
- CityOn Zhengzhou Shopping Center - Zhengzhou, China
- Starfield Hanam - Hanam, South Korea
