= Richard E. Jacobs =

American businessman (1925–2009)

- Dick Jacobs during the construction of Jacobs Field, 1994.
- Born: Richard E. Jacobs; June 16, 1925; Akron, Ohio, U.S.
- Died: June 5, 2009 (aged 83); Westlake, Ohio, U.S.
- Education: B.A. Indiana University
- Occupations: Businessman, Sports Entrepreneur, Sports Franchise Owner, Real Estate Developer
- Known for: Co-founder of Richard E. Jacobs Group, and Owner of Cleveland Indians from 1986 to 1999
- Spouse: Helen Jacobs (Chaney) (divorced 1983)
- Children: 3
- Parent(s): Vivan and Adeline Jacobs
- Family: David H. Jacobs (brother); Jeffery P. Jacobs (son)
- Awards: Two-time American League Champion 1995, 1997, Cleveland Indians Hall of Fame (class of 2009)

Richard E. "Dick" Jacobs (June 16, 1925 – June 5, 2009) was an American businessman and real estate developer who co-founded the Jacobs Entertainment, Inc., Richard E. Jacobs Group, and was owner of the Cleveland Indians from 1986 to 1999.

== Biography ==
Jacobs was born in 1925 in Akron, Ohio, In 1943, he served in the Army during World War II. In 1949, he graduated from Indiana University with a degree in business administration and accepted a job with a development company in Akron. In 1955, he and his brother, David H. Jacobs, started a general contracting company that concentrated on the building of small strip malls. The company grew rapidly and by 1992, the Jacobs Group ranked fourth in the nation in the development and management of enclosed malls owning 40 malls in 16 states outright; they also owned 31 Wendy's fast-food restaurants and several Marriott Hotels & Resorts. The Jacobs Group company builds and leases shopping centers, offices, and hotels. Among its properties are Key Tower and Westgate Mall in Cleveland, Ohio, and Triangle Town Center in Raleigh, North Carolina. His company also built Westland Mall, Northland Mall, Eastland Mall in Columbus, Ohio, and SouthPark Center in Strongsville, Ohio.

Along with his brother, Jacobs was also well known for owning the Cleveland Indians of Major League Baseball (MLB) from 1986 to 1999; after David's death in 1992, Richard operated the team on his own. In 1994, Jacobs Field would open as the new venue of the Indians in downtown Cleveland. The ballpark bore his family name from its opening in April 1994 until January 2008. Jacobs' tenure as Indians owner marked one of the team's most successful periods in franchise history the team went 1119-1080 during the regular season, and 25-22 during the postseason, reaching the World Series on two occasions (1995, and 1997), and winning American League Central Division championships in five consecutive seasons (1995-1999). Under Jacobs ownership the Indians also hosted the 1997 Major League Baseball All-Star Game, the first held in Cleveland in sixteen years.

Jacobs was a co-owner with his son, Jeffery P. Jacobs, of Jacobs Entertainment, Inc., a casino and racetrack company after they merged companies in 2002.

Jacobs died on June 5, 2009, after a long illness at his Westlake home. The funeral was held at the Rocky River United Methodist Church. He was buried at Lakewood Park Cemetery in Rocky River, Ohio.

== Awards and honors ==
=== As Indians owner ===
- Two-time American League Champion 1995, 1997
- Five-time American League Central Division Champion (1995, 1996, 1997, 1998, 1999)
- Cleveland Indians Hall of Fame (class of 2009)

=== As a businessman ===
- 2009 Downtown Cleveland Alliance Ruth Ratner Miller Award (for his contributions in developing the downtown area - awarded posthumously)
- The Cleveland Clinic branch in Avon, Ohio, named the Richard E. Jacobs Health Center
- Nautica Pavilion in Cleveland renamed Jacobs Pavilion (partially) in honor of Jacobs in 2011 following his death (as his son Jeff owns the facility).
