= GTE mainStreet =

American interactive television project

GTE mainStreet, also known as mainStreet USA, was one of the first interactive television projects.

Internet style content was available through this television service before the internet was widely accessible. mainStreet started in the mid-1980s and matured technically with rich new content from 1990 to 1998. The explosive popularity of Netscape and the World Wide Web in the late 1990s made mainStreet obsolete. The product worked via a set-top box and utilised the customer's telephone line to send signals from the TV remote to GTE's central computers, which in turn sent the programming downstream over GTE's fiber-optic cables and the local cable television provider's coax infrastructure. As such, the images appeared much more quickly than they did on a PC with a modem at the time.

== See also ==
- QUBE
