= SouthPark Mall (Ohio) =

Shopping mall in Strongsville, Ohio, U.S.

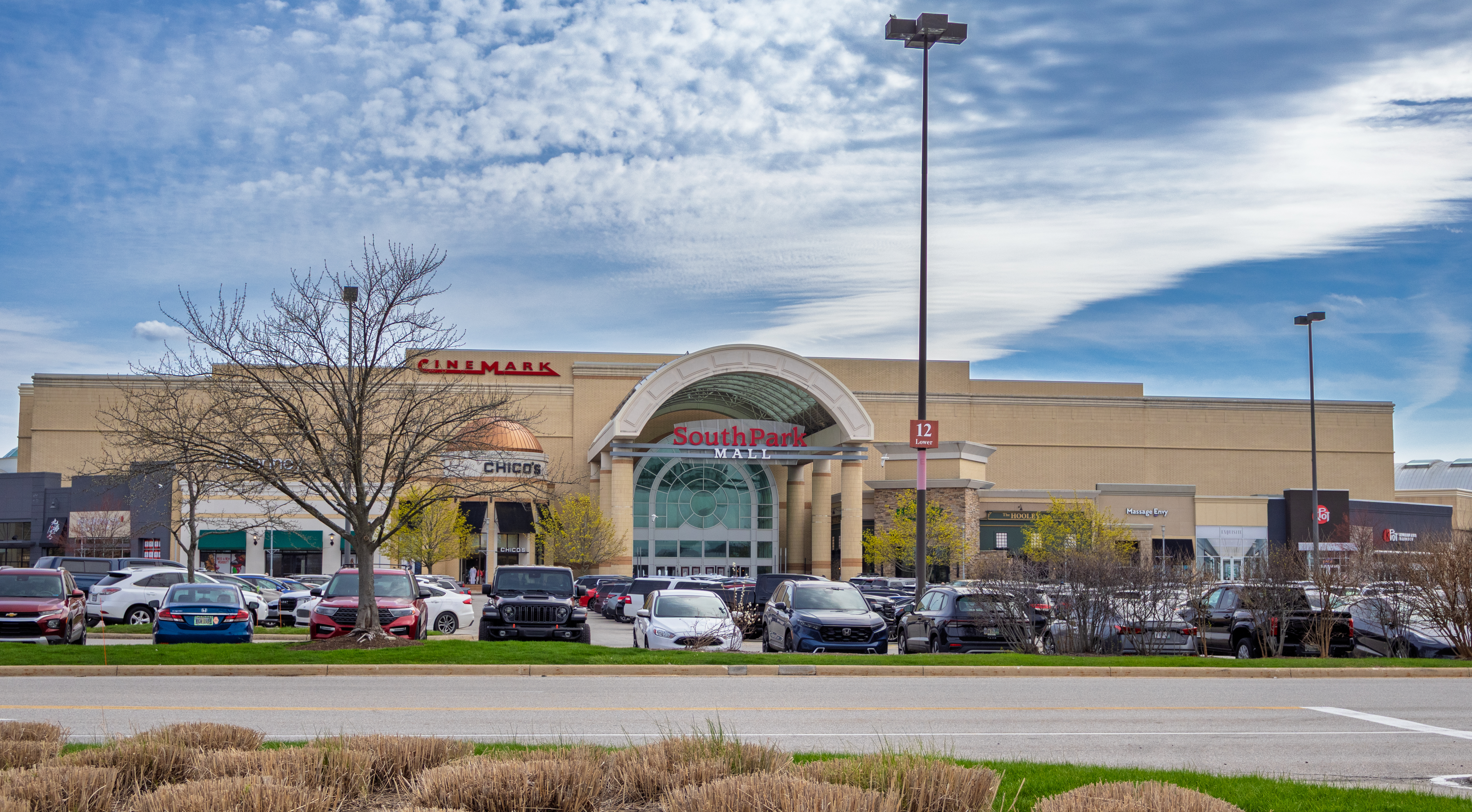
- Location: Strongsville, Ohio, United States
- Coordinates: 41°18′30″N 81°49′13″W
- Address: 500 Southpark Center, Strongsville, OH 44136
- Opened: October 16, 1996; 30 years ago
- Developer: Richard E. Jacobs Group
- Manager: Spinoso Real Estate Group
- Owner: Kize Capital LP
- Num. of stores: 170
- Num. of anchor tenants: 7 (6 open, 1 vacant)
- Floor area: 1,677,272 square feet (155,823.7 m^{2})
- Floors: 2
- Parking: 7,253 parking spaces
- Public transit: RTA
- Website: www.shoppingsouthparkmall.com

SouthPark Mall is an enclosed shopping mall located in Strongsville, Ohio, United States, a Greater Cleveland suburb. Its anchor stores are Dick's House of Sport, Dillard's, JCPenney, Macy's, and a 14-screen Cinemark movie theater. Kohl's is also an anchor, though located on the outskirts of the plaza. At 1,677,272 square feet (155,823.7 m^{2}), SouthPark Mall is one of the largest shopping centers in Ohio, and is also ranked as one of the largest shopping malls in the United States. The mall features over 170 specialty shops and restaurants, and is the largest retail destination in Northern Ohio.

== History ==
As early as the 1960s, the intersection of Royalton Road (SR 82) and Howe Road in the rapidly expanding suburb was coveted for commercial use.

Plans for a 80 million dollar 2 story shopping mall were announced on March 10, 1973. The project was originally a joint-venture between developer Richard E. Jacobs and the Edward J. DeBartolo Corporation. The mall was to have 4 anchors and about 125 stores and restaurants. Plans were delayed and the mall wasn't approved until 1991.

A secret plan by former Cleveland Browns owner Art Modell to build a new stadium at the site was exposed by the media in the 1980s and subsequently scrapped. The land was eventually sold to the Richard E. Jacobs Group, which later unveiled its first plans for a major mall. The Higbee Company and May Company Ohio, Cleveland's two major department store companies, announced that they would join as anchors.

Plans were approved in 1991, the construction finishing in 1995, with the $200 million SouthPark Center opening on October 16, 1996. The completed center included Dillard's (the renamed Higbee's) and Kaufmann's (the renamed May Company, now Macy's), JCPenney, Sears, over 100 retailers, a food court, a branch of The Cleveland Clinic and restaurants outlying the perimeter. Kohl's also joined as an anchor, though on the outlying perimeter road surrounding the mall. The project also made allowances for an eventual fifth mall anchor store location, originally planned to be Nordstrom, later to become Dick's Sporting Goods, plus substantial peripheral development.

Westfield Group acquired the shopping center in early 2002 from the Richard E. Jacobs Group, and renamed it "Westfield Shoppingtown SouthPark", dropping the "Shoppingtown" name in June 2005. In 2006, it commenced a $60 million expansion and reconfiguration of the center, thus adding 25 upscale shops and restaurants, a rear porte-cochere entrance, and a 14-screen Cinemark movie theater. Dick's Sporting Goods was also added at this time to become the mall's newest anchor store.

In April 2012, the mall was sold to Starwood Capital Group, along with seven other Westfield properties. As a result, Starwood changed the name to SouthPark Mall. In May 2016, Starwood Retail Partners announced the opening of The Commons At SouthPark, a $14 million redevelopment of a former Giant Eagle located on Route 82. On May 31, 2018, Sears Holdings announced that the Sears location at SouthPark would be closing in September 2018 as part of a plan to close 72 stores nationwide. The Sears store officially closed on September 2, 2018. As of October 2019, SouthPark Mall remains the largest retail destination in Northern Ohio. On April 28, 2021, SouthPark changed ownership from Starwood Retail Partners to a company related to Kize Capital LP with Spinoso Real Estate Group managing the mall.

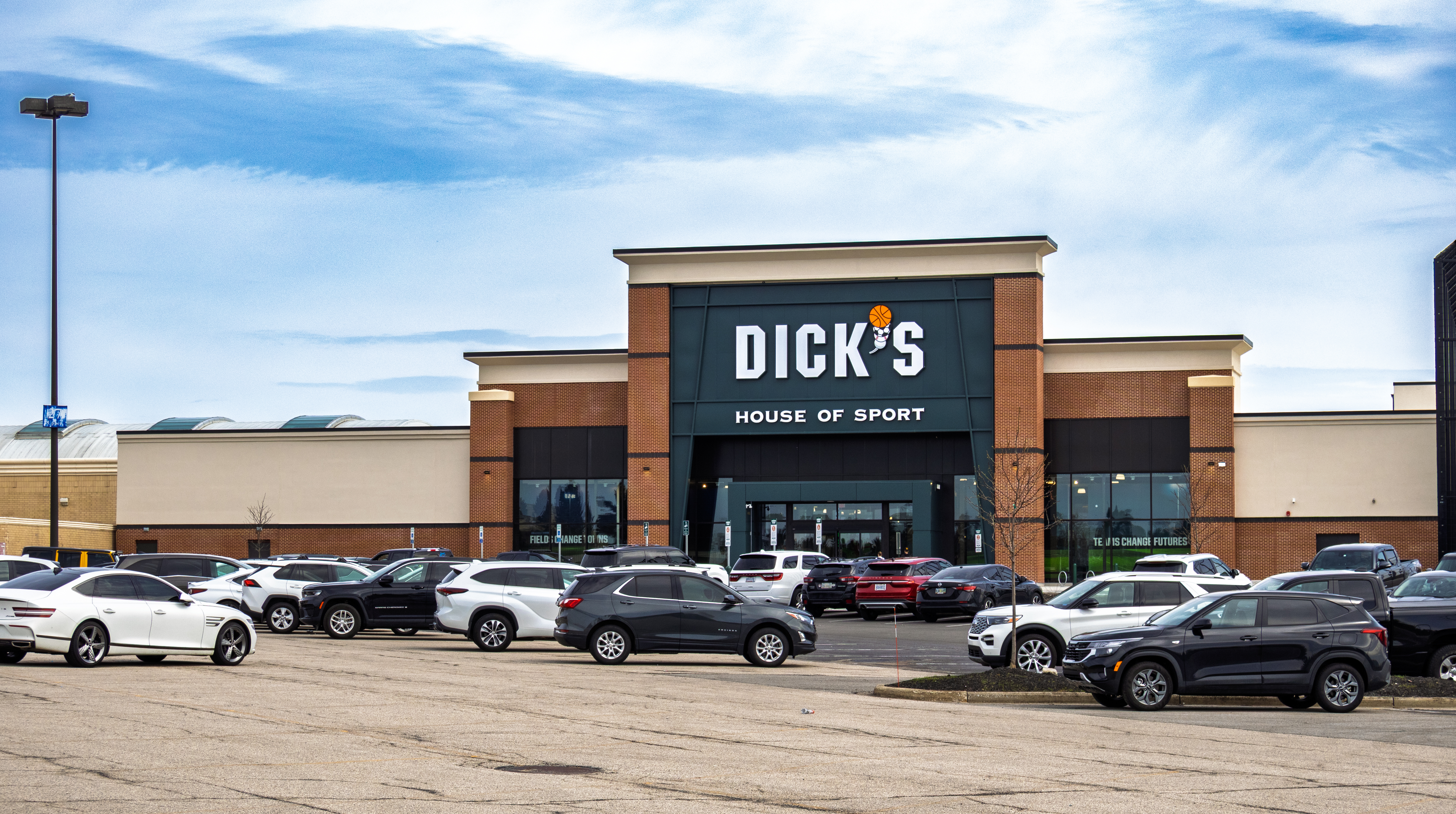
Dick's House of Sport main entrance at SouthPark Mall

In October 2025, Dick’s Sporting Goods opened a new location that is larger, within the former Sears anchor pad in a larger store known as Dick’s House of Sport.

== Events ==
On March 24, 2004, Avril Lavigne made a brief performance of her hit songs and new releases, as part of her Live by Surprise Tour.

== See also ==
- List of shopping malls in the United States
