= Kids Are People Too =

- Original Kids Are People Too logo
- Genre: Variety show Talk show
- Created by: Bob McAllister
- Written by: Ray Reese
- Directed by: Don Roy King
- Presented by: Bob McAllister (1978); Michael Young (1978-1982: 1986-87); Randy Hamilton (1981-1982)
- Opening theme: "Kids Are People Too"
- Ending theme: "Kids Are People Too"
- Country of origin: United States
- Original language: English

Production
- Running time: 90 minutes

Original release
- Network: ABC
- Release: September 10, 1978 – September 5, 1982

Related
- Wonderama

Kids Are People Too is an American television series that ran on Sunday mornings from 1978 to 1982 on ABC. The series was a variety/news magazine show oriented toward kids, with the intention of recognizing them as people. During its four-year run, the series was nominated for five Emmy Awards and won the 1978 Emmy Award for Outstanding Children's Entertainment Series. The series included celebrity interviews, cartoons, music, and other information that appealed to children.

== History ==
Bob McAllister had hosted a New York City-based children's television series, Wonderama, for over a decade when the series was taken off the air in 1977. As the host, McAllister sang the closing theme song "Kids Are People Too". Shortly after that series was taken off the air, ABC offered him another series that tried to capitalize on Wonderama's more than 20 years of children's entertainment by using the song's title as the new series title.

However, the show that he was hired to emcee on ABC was aimed at teens, not the younger children McAllister preferred, and this led to creative disputes with the producers and network executives over the portrayal of violence. In November 1978, McAllister was fired from Kids Are People Too and was replaced by Michael Young and later by actor/singer Randy Hamilton (who, at the same time, was playing Rikki Dekker on the NBC soap opera Texas) as the program's hosts.

The series later returned as a weekly syndicated program during the 1986-87 season, with Michael Young back as host.

== Format ==
KISS, introducing newest member Eric Carr on Kids Are People Too

The series was a variety/news magazine show for kids. Every week it would have a celebrity guest who the host would interview, occasionally a psychologist would speak about the challenges of growing up, and there would be comedy or musical routines. Each episode also included a segment called "Dear Alex and Annie" (with William Bingham as Alex and Donna Drake as Annie), answering viewers' questions on a wide range of personal and social topics that were relevant to kids (that segment would later be seen in a stand-alone interstitial segment during ABC's Saturday morning schedule).

The series attracted guests such as Bill Cosby, Debbie Harry, Billy Dee Williams, Cheap Trick, Patti Smith and Brooke Shields. Just like CBS's Kids Say the Darndest Things, the show often produced unexpected results when the host would ask the audience questions. When Kiss replaced drummer Peter Criss, they introduced their new drummer, Eric Carr, on a July 1980 episode of Kids Are People Too. Prior to the band's coming out on stage, the host asked an audience member, "Who's your favorite band member?" The youth responded, "Peter Criss. Er, um, I mean... Ace Frehley." Kids Are People Too was seen the first two seasons as 90 minute versions in most major city markets including Chicago, New York City, Los Angeles, San Francisco and Detroit, and it also featured locally-produced cutaway segments by the ABC O&O stations in these markets.
