= Lazarus (department store) =

American department store chain

F&R Lazarus & Co.
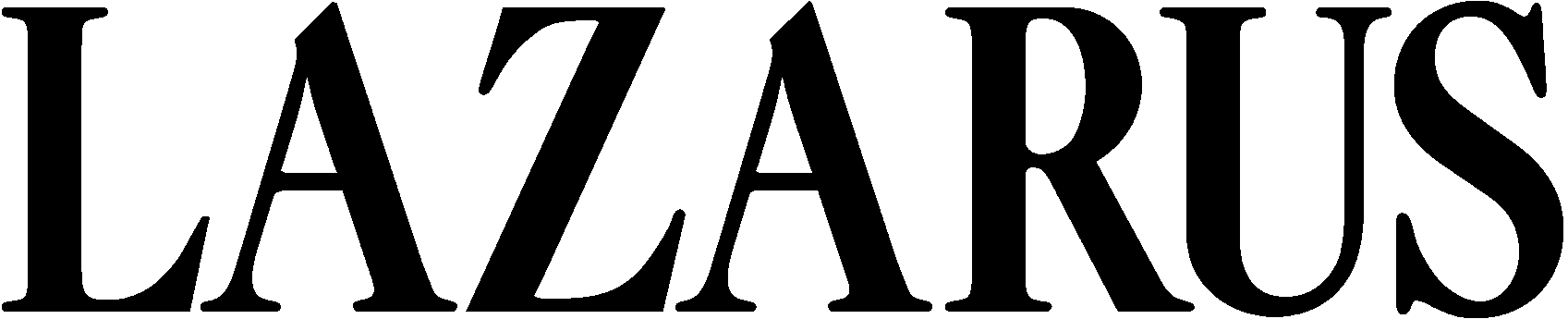

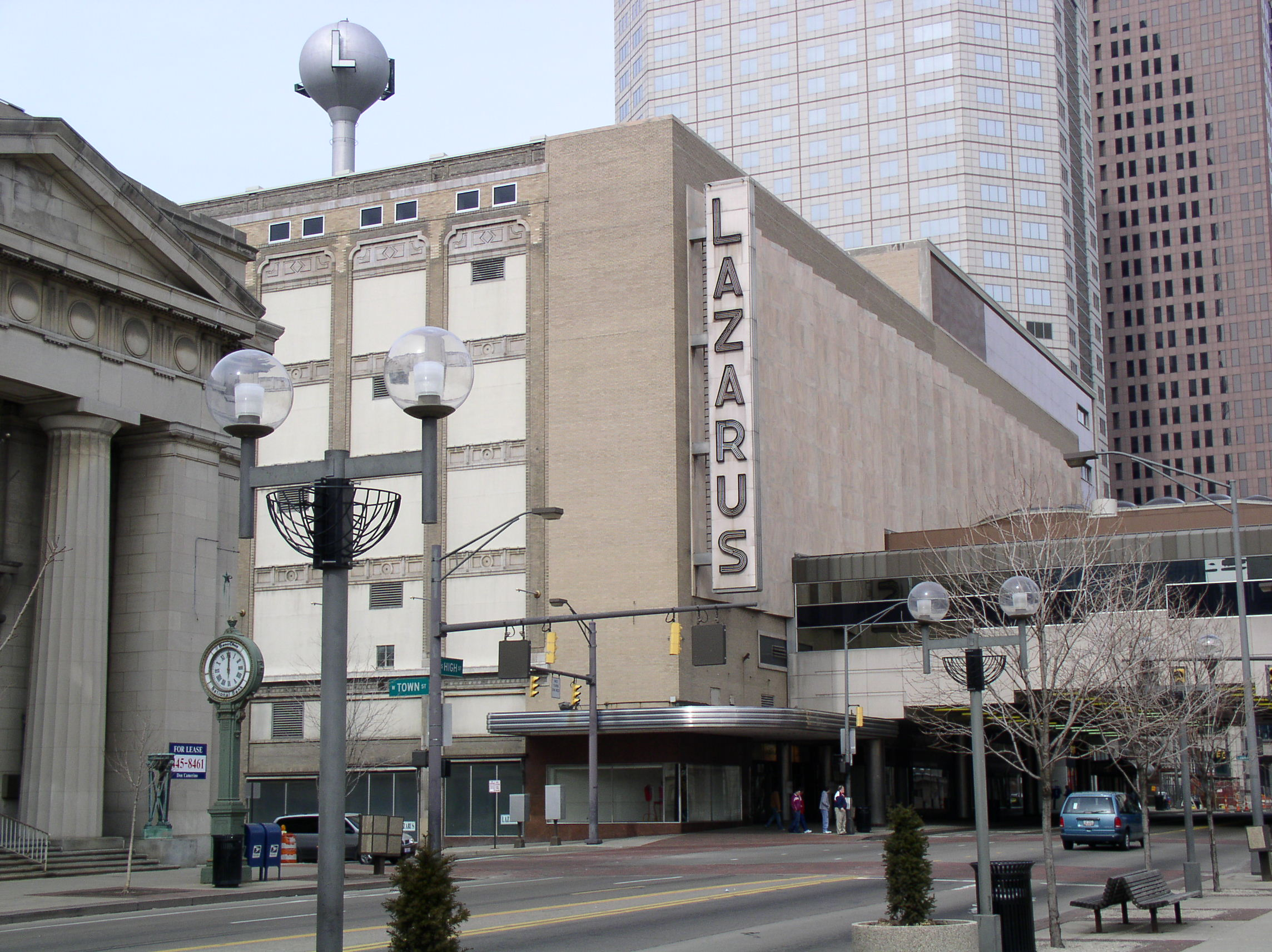
- Exterior of the former flagship store in downtown Columbus (2007)
- Formerly: Lazarus–Macy's (2003–2005)
- Type: Subsidiary
- Industry: Retail
- Genre: Department stores
- Founded: 1851; 175 years ago in Columbus, Ohio, United States
- Founder: Simon Lazarus
- Defunct: March 6, 2005; 21 years ago
- Fate: Converted into Macy's
- Successor: Macy's
- Headquarters: Columbus, Ohio, United States
- Area served: United States
- Products: Clothing; footwear; bedding; furniture; jewelry; beauty products; housewares
- Parent: Federated Department Stores (1929–2005)
- Subsidiaries: Shillito’s (1928-1929)

Lazarus was an American department store chain founded in 1851 by Simon Lazarus. It was headquartered in Columbus, Ohio, and operated throughout the Midwest. The store was a founding partner of the Federated Department Stores holding company in 1929. Federated rebranded the chain as Lazarus–Macy's in 2003, and dissolved Lazarus completely with its full conversion to Macy's in 2005.

== History ==
=== Origins ===
Simon Lazarus, founder of what was to become The F&R Lazarus & Co., which blossomed into Macy's, Inc. (formerly Federated Department Stores).

Family patriarch Simon Lazarus (1808–1877) opened a one-room men's clothing store in downtown Columbus in 1851. By 1870, with improvements to the industry in the mass manufacture of men's uniforms for the Civil War, the family business expanded to include ready-made men's civilian clothing, and eventually, a complete line of merchandise.

Sons Fred Lazarus Sr. (1850–1917) and Ralph Lazarus (1852–1903) joined the business and added many innovative marketing techniques. The company acquired the John Shillito Company of Cincinnati in 1928 (established in 1830), and a year later, was one of the four founding members of Federated Department Stores (along with Williams Filene's Sons Co. and Abraham & Straus). Bloomingdale Brothers joined the company in 1930.

Lazarus developed or was an early adopter of many shopping innovations such as "one low price" (no bargaining necessary, earlier implemented by the John Wanamaker Store), first department store escalators in the country, first air-conditioned store in the country, and Fred Lazarus Jr. successfully lobbied President Franklin Roosevelt to permanently fix Thanksgiving as the fourth Thursday in November, ensuring a stable timetable for the official beginning of the Christmas shopping season.

Those who worked at Lazarus were not called employees, but associates.

=== Establishment of Federated ===
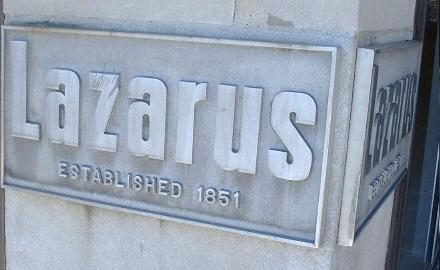
Lazarus plaque

Fred Lazarus Jr. served as president of Federated Department Stores, Inc. from its founding until 1947, and thereafter, served as board chairman until his death. He was succeeded by his son Ralph Lazarus (1914–1988), who led Federated through the 1980s. Various Lazarus family members also held key positions on Federated's board and within its various divisions, namely, Foley's, Filene's, Lazarus and Shillito's. Robert Lazarus Jr. (1927–2013) was the last family member with an official role at Federated, serving as assistant to Ron Klein in 2002, then chairman and CEO of the Rich's/Lazarus/Goldsmith's operating unit of Federated, now a portion of Macy's.

=== Expansion ===
Primarily operating in central Ohio, Lazarus dominated its market, driving the last of its traditional rivals out of business by 1982. Eventually expanding into Indianapolis, Indiana, in 1973 and Huntington, West Virginia, in 1981; in 1986 Lazarus merged with fellow Federated division Shillito–Rike's, itself the result of a 1982 merger between Shillito's (John Shillito Co.) and Dayton, Ohio-based Rike's, acquired by Federated in 1959. The new division adopted the Lazarus nameplate, while assuming Shillito–Rike's headquarters in Cincinnati.

In 1987, Federated acquired William H. Block Company of Indianapolis, Indiana (including Wren's, Springfield, Ohio) and Herpolsheimer's of Grand Rapids, Michigan from Allied Stores and incorporated them into Lazarus. (The Grand Rapids Lazarus stores, converted from the Herpolsheimer's name in late 1987, were shuttered in September 1990.) In 1989, Lazarus' sprawling downtown Columbus flagship store became one of the three anchors of Columbus City Center mall, when developer Taubman Centers constructed a pedestrian skywalk to it over South High Street.

Federated experimented with several different formats in the Lazarus division. In 1967, Federated opened its Gold Circle discount department store division in Columbus, locating stores directly across from Lazarus stores at Northland, Eastland and Westland malls. In the mid-1970s Federated opened its "Capri" shops, off-mall Lazarus stores that sold budget store goods. Lazarus eventually opened three "Capri" shops, but they were later converted to limited-assortment Lazarus stores. Lazarus was the only Federated division to open full-line stores in tertiary markets such as Lima, Ohio; Huntington, West Virginia and Ontario, Ohio. Federated also experimented with "Home Works at Lazarus" which was somewhat similar to today's HomeGoods or Bed Bath & Beyond stores. Finally, in the mid-1980s Lazarus experimented with small-market stores in Owensboro, Kentucky; and Lancaster, Newark and Zanesville, Ohio, all of which have since closed.

In 1994, Joseph Horne Co., Pittsburgh, Pennsylvania, was acquired by Federated and its 10 locations absorbed by Lazarus. Lazarus moved into the 630,000 square feet (59,000 m^{2}) Horne's building for one year before building a new more modern location.

=== Conversion to Macy's ===
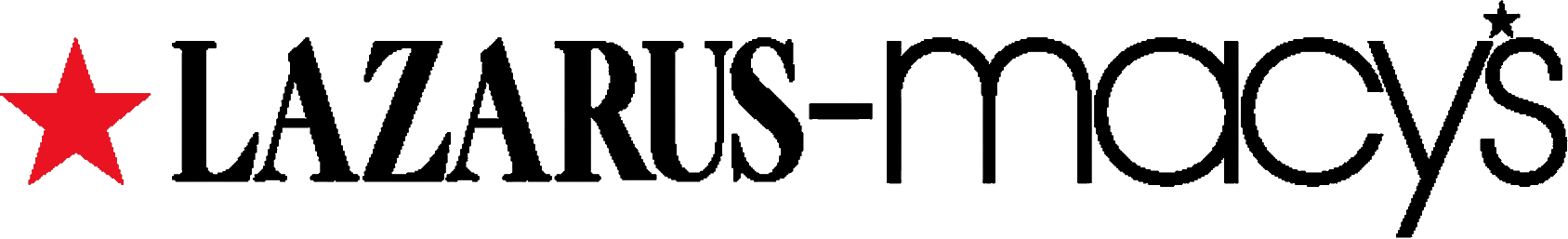
Lazarus-Macy's logo (2003–2005)

Having absorbed several department stores itself over the years, in 1995 the chain was integrated into an Atlanta, Georgia-based division of Federated along with that city's Rich's and Memphis, Tennessee's Goldsmith's, while retaining its name in local markets. In 2003, Lazarus was among Federated's five smaller nameplates absorbed into the Macy's brand, along with The Bon Marché, Burdines, Goldsmith's, and Rich's. The stores were branded as Lazarus-Macy's in 2003 and Macy's in 2005.

The converted former Lazarus stores initially were part of the Macy's South division. In early 2007, after systems integrations were complete, the stores comprising the former Lazarus franchise in Ohio, Indiana, West Virginia, Western Pennsylvania, and Kentucky were transferred to the Macy's Midwest division, based in St. Louis, Missouri. By February 2008, Macy's Midwest was merged with Atlanta-based Macy's South to form a newly constituted Macy's Central division.

== See also ==
- List of defunct department stores of the United States
- List of department stores converted to Macy's
