= The Mall at Tuttle Crossing =

Shopping mall in Central Ohio

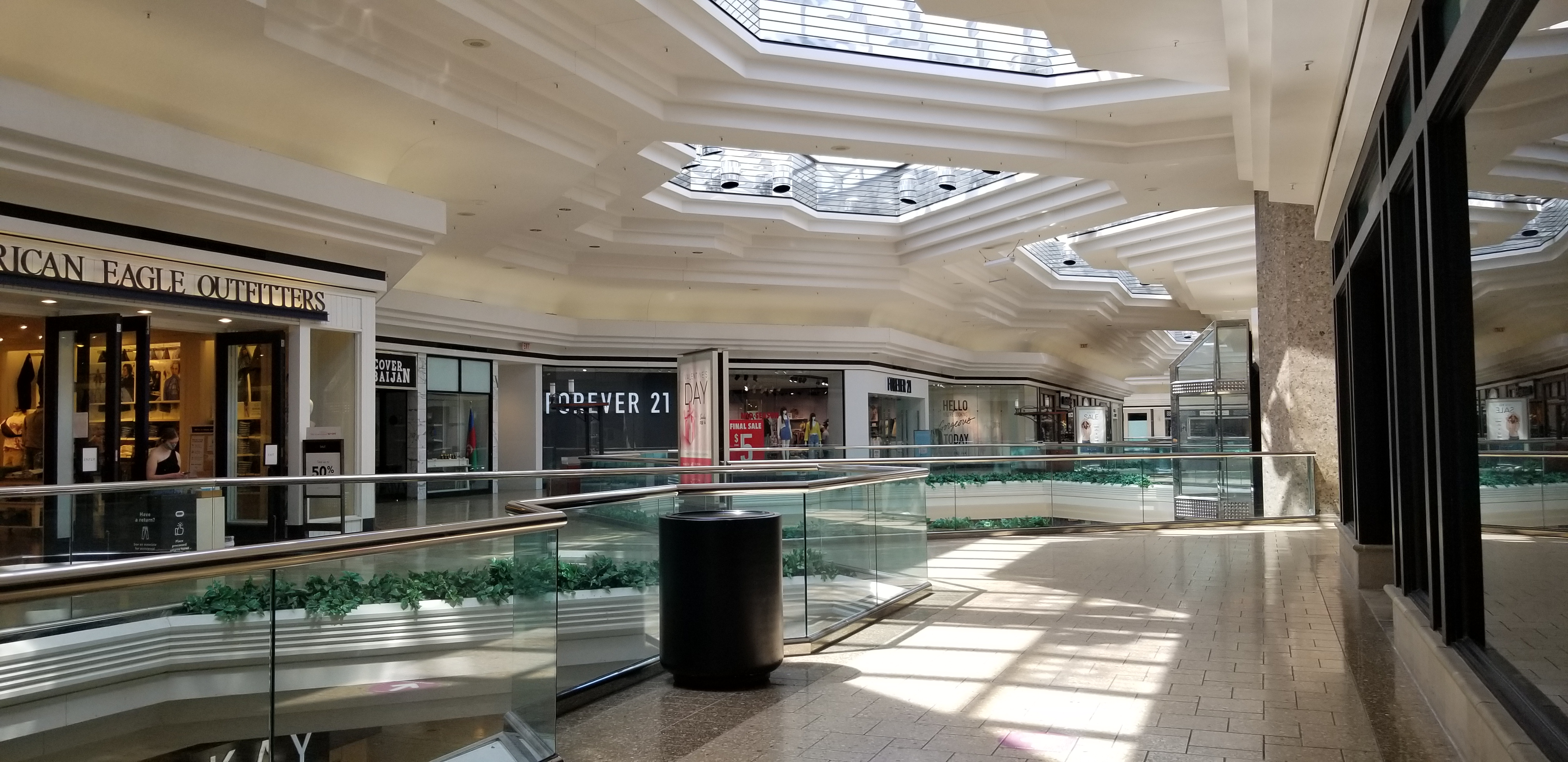
- Mall interior
- Location: Near Dublin, Ohio
- Coordinates: 40.072908°N 83.130509°W
- Address: 5043 Tuttle Crossing Boulevard
- Opened: July 24, 1997; 29 years ago
- Developer: Taubman Centers and The Georgetown Company
- Manager: Mason Asset Management
- Owner: Namdar Realty Group
- Num. of stores: 36
- Num. of anchor tenants: 4 (3 open, 1 vacant)
- Floor area: 1,123,248 square feet (104,353 square meters)
- Floors: 2
- Public transit: 21
- Website: www.shoptuttlecrossing.com

The Mall at Tuttle Crossing is an enclosed shopping mall located in northwest Columbus, Ohio. It has a Dublin, Ohio mailing address, but it is in the Columbus city limits. It was developed by a joint venture of Taubman Centers and the Georgetown Company and opened July 24, 1997. In 2021, the mall was reported to be heading towards foreclosure. The anchor stores are Macy's, Scene75 Entertainment Center, and JCPenney. One vacant store previously housed Sears.

== History ==
The mall was originally planned for a site at Sawmill Road and SR 161, however plans did not materialize and the site ultimately became Sun Center in 1994.

The mall opened on July 11, 1997 with Sears, Lazarus, Marshall Field's, and JCPenney as anchor stores.

In 2003, Lazarus was rebranded Lazarus-Macy's, and the original Marshall Field's became Kaufmann's in February 2003. Lazarus-Macy’s became Macy’s in March 2005. In 2006, due to the Federated-May merger, the Kaufmann's store was renamed Macy's at Hayden Run.

As of October 2006 there were two Macy's located at the mall, Macy's at Tuttle Crossing (the original Lazarus store) and Macy's at Hayden Run (the former Marshall Field's/Kaufmann's) until March 2017.

On January 4, 2017, Macy's announced it would close its store at Hayden Run later that year.

In early summer 2018, Scene75 Entertainment purchased the former Marshall Field's/Kaufmann's/Macy's building and tract. Soon after Scene75 on October 11, 2019 they were open to the public.

On December 28, 2018, it was announced that Sears would also be closing as part of a plan to close 80 stores nationwide. The store closed in March 2019.

The Mall portion has had three owners during its history (both prior owners were purchased by Simon):

- Taubman Centers from its opening in 1997 until 2003.
- The Mills Corporation from 2003 until 2007.
- Simon Property Group, which owned 50%, and managed by Simon from April 2007 until 2020.
- The Woodmont Company, was the management company for the mall from 2020 to 2023.
- Namdar Realty Group is the current management company for the mall from 2023 to present.

=== Decline ===
In its prime, The Mall at Tuttle Crossing boasted over 150 tenants and eateries, which at the time made it the largest enclosed mall in Central Ohio by store count. Although it was quickly overshadowed by the opening of Easton Town Center and Polaris Fashion Place, the mall remained strong until 2020 with occupancy rates over 90% and many popular anchor and inline tenants. Starting in 2020, however, the mall began a steady decline in tenancy. Losing some tenants such as Victoria's Secret and Pink (Victoria's Secret) during the year.

In May 2020, Simon Property Group defaulted on the mortgage with over $114 million in debt from the property, and the mall was foreclosed later in the same year. Occupancy rates were initially remaining strong despite this, boasting an occupancy rate of over 90% at the end of 2021. Which was an increase from the 2020 store count and displayed potential growth for the property. Alongside strong anchors such as Scene75, Macy's, and JCPenney driving significant traffic to the mall.

The uptick in tenants was short lived however, as the mall began a significant decline after 2021 in occupancy and reputation. On June 23, 2022, a shooting occurred within the mall, killing one individual as a result of an altercation in a shoe store. The perpetrator, Tyrone Gray was found guilty of murder and inducing panic in 2025 and was sentenced to 21 years in prison. Later in 2022, several stores such as Red Robin shuttered permanently.

In October 2023, Namdar Reality Group purchased the mall for $19.5 million. The malls occupancy rate was under 70% by the end of 2023. And several popular tenants, such as H&M and The Childrens Place closed soon after. The mall has lost significantly more stores since, such as the closure of Forever 21, AVR's Furniture, and Claire's as tenants within the mall.

As of December 2025, the mall boasts minimal original tenants or chains. It is largely occupied by local businesses and kiosks rather than major national chains.

== Current anchors ==
- JCPenney (opened in 1997)
- Macy's at Tuttle Crossing (opened in 2005)
- Scene75 Entertainment (opened in 2019)

== Former anchors ==
- Lazarus (opened in 1997, renamed in 2005 to Macy's (at Tuttle Crossing))
- Marshall Field's (opened in 1997, became Kaufmann's in 2003, then became Macy's (at Hayden Run) in 2006, closed in 2017, became Scene75 in 2019)
- Sears (opened in 1997, closed in 2019, now vacant)
