= Michael Young (actor) =

American actor and television host

Michael Meredith Young (born March 8, 1952) is an American actor and television host.

An Emmy Award winner (recognized for ABC's Kids Are People Too!, ESPN, Young Talent Time and CBS's Miss Teen USA), he was part of the launch teams at CNBC, The Disney Channel, and Pax TV. Young began his career at QUBE, the world's first interactive TV network, created by Warner Communications, where his show won cable TV's first ACE award for entertainment series. Young would later host the Florida Lottery game show Flamingo Fortune alongside Lisa Stahl.

== Biography ==
=== Early life and education ===
Young was born in Montgomery, Alabama. His father was a career Air Force Officer and Michael immediately moved to Tokyo. His elementary education was in Texas, Colorado, Paris, and McLean, Virginia. He attended Langley High School, Wagner High School at Clark AFB in the Philippines, and International School Bangkok in Thailand where he was Senior Class President, graduating in 1970. He attended Auburn University and received a bachelor's degree in Pre-Law Political Science. He was member of the Sigma Alpha Epsilon fraternity, and Who’s Who in American Colleges and Universities.

=== Later career ===
In 1994 Young created Alton Entertainment to specifically produce informational TV programs with a new client-driven financial model - profiled on the front page of the Marketing section of the Wall Street Journal, 8/10/94. Alton's first program, Main Floor, ran in national broadcast syndication for 12 years. The show's website was established in 1994 and was one of the first fashion Internet sites, eventually becoming all video. Young sold Alton Entertainment to the Interpublic Group of Companies.

In 2001 Young established Michael Young Media and produced web video content for magazine clients such as Vogue, Lucky, Condé Nast Media Group, Better Homes & Gardens, Ladies' Home Journal, and American Baby. The first effort, TrendWatch, launched Vogue.tv. This company also began producing twice-annual convention events for Asset Marketing Systems, a financial services company, in 2004.

=== Personal life ===
In March 1990 Young married Chilean television personality and former Miss Universe winner Cecilia Bolocco in Santiago. Their marriage was annulled in 2001. In December 2012 Young married Stephanie Gardner, a dermatologist, and moved to Atlanta.

== See also ==
- EPCOT Magazine, program hosted by Michael Young
