= Polaris Fashion Place =

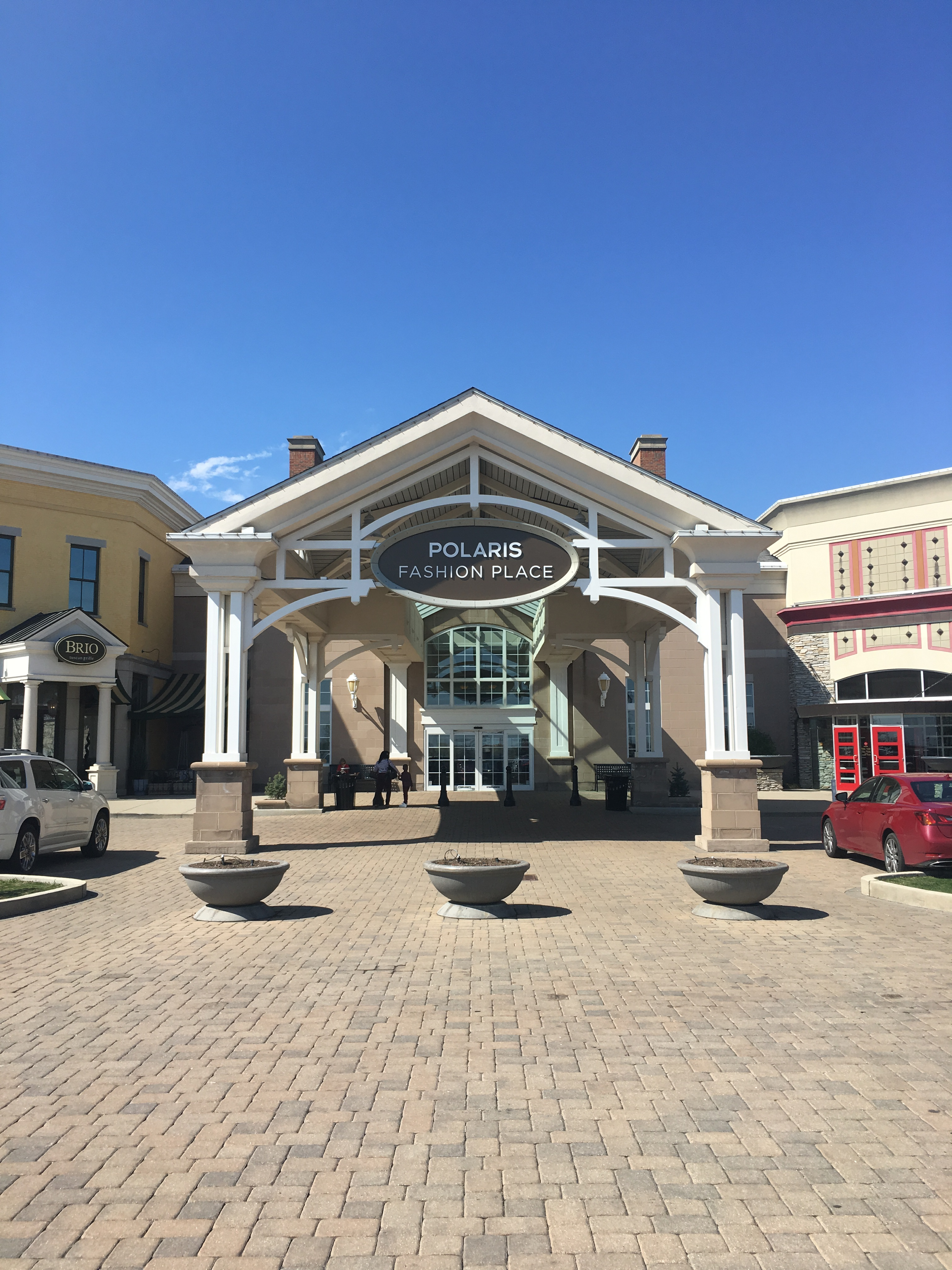
- The Main Entrance is located between Molly Woo's and Brio Tuscan Grille.
- Location: Columbus, Ohio, U.S.
- Coordinates: 40.145596°N 82.981500°W
- Address: 1500 Polaris Pkwy.
- Opened: November 2001; 25 years ago
- Developer: Glimcher Realty Trust
- Manager: O'Connor Capital Partners
- Owner: O'Connor Capital Partners Group
- Num. of stores: 200
- Num. of anchor tenants: 5 (4 open 1 vacant)
- Floor area: 1,278,277 square feet (118,756 m^{2})
- Floors: 2
- Public transit: 41, 102 PARTA 200
- Website: polarisfashionplace.com

Polaris Fashion Place is a two-level shopping mall and surrounding retail plaza serving Columbus, Ohio, United States. The mall, owned locally by O'Connor Capital Partners, is located off Interstate 71 on Polaris Parkway in Delaware County just to the north of the boundary between Delaware and Franklin County. The mall features four anchor stores: Dick's House of Sport, Von Maur, Macy's, and JCPenney, as well as an outdoor promenade which includes Dave & Buster's and Barnes & Noble.

The mall is part of the much larger 1,200-acre POLARIS Centers of Commerce real estate development in northern Columbus. This development includes the McCoy Center, the Polaris Founder's Park along with over a hundred other commercial and residential developments.

== History ==
Glimcher Realty Trust began construction on Polaris Fashion Place in June 2000. The mall opened in November 2001 with 146 inline tenants. The developers chose to include several tenants which were lacking in the market, including four of the seven anchor stores: Kaufmann's, The Great Indoors, Lord & Taylor, and Saks Fifth Avenue. The other three anchors were JCPenney, Sears and Lazarus; all three relocated from Northland Mall, which closed on October 31, 2002 following the loss of its remaining inline tenants and the Northland Mall was demolished in February 2004.

In 2003, the Lazarus store was dual-branded as Lazarus-Macy's, and then to just Macy's in 2005. After the 2006 acquisition by Federated Stores (now Macy's, Inc.) of Kaufmann's parent company, May Department Stores Company, the Kaufmann's store was shuttered and sold to Glimcher for redevelopment. In 2007, the store was demolished for an outdoor expansion comprising Barnes & Noble, Forever 21 and several restaurants, including Benihana, The Cheesecake Factory and Dave & Buster's. This concourse opened in 2008. Lord & Taylor was repositioned and shuttered entirely in 2004. It was replaced with Von Maur, whose location at the mall is also the first in the state.

On February 22, 2012, Sears Holdings Corporation announced it would be closing all 9 of its Great Indoors. It was replaced by a dual-branded Dick's Sporting Goods and its subsidiary Field & Stream (later Public Lands) in 2015. In August 2025, both stores reopened under the Dick's House of Sport brand.

In 2019, Sears closed. In 2021, it was replaced with Fieldhouse USA, a multi-discipline indoor sports facility.

In March 2021, the mall saw two separate shooting incidents within the interior corridors, on March 3 and 15. These were the first such incidents in the mall's history.

In February 2026, it was announced that the Saks Fifth Avenue anchor store would close by April 2026.
