= Jay T. Will =

American martial artist (1942–1995)

- Born: Jay T. Will; March 10, 1942; Columbus, Ohio, United States
- Died: March 15, 1995 (aged 53) (United States) Atlanta, Georgia
- Style: Kenpo Karate
- Teachers: Ed Parker, Al Tracy
- Rank: 8th degree black belt in Kenpo Karate

Jay T. Will (March 10, 1942 – March 15, 1995) was an American martial artist. He trained under Ed Parker and Al Tracy in American Kenpo and was promoted by the latter to the rank of 8th degree black belt.

Will taught over 10,000 students and was a tournament competitor and a referee (he was PKA Referee of the Year in 1982 and 1983, and Karate International magazine's "Referee of the Decade"), and a media commentator on martial arts competitions. He appeared in over 20 films and also appeared on television many times including "Kenpo Karate for Self-Defense" on WOSU-TV and Warner QUBE and the syndicated movie matinee show "Black Belt Theater" that he hosted. He also taught martial arts at law enforcement agencies, and the Ohio State University, and Wittenberg University.

Will was an active member of SAG (Screen Actors Guild) and worked as a stuntman in both film and television. A sampling of his 80s television work included America Goes Bananas, The A-Team, Battlestar Galactica, CBS Sports Spectacular, City on Fire, Force Five, Jaguar Lives, Knight Rider, MacGyver, Meteor, Miami Vice, Remington Steele, Riptide, The Fall Guy.

He graced the covers of several prominent martial arts magazines and was frequently featured in editorial spreads throughout the industry.

He completed his undergraduate at San Jose State University where he met his first wife, Kathleen Will. They had two daughters, Shawn Kathleen and Haven. While he was still alive, his oldest daughter, Shawn Kathleen gave birth to his only grandchild, Megan.

He also authored two books: Kenpo Karate for Self-Defense and Advanced Kenpo Karate.

n 1985, he was convicted of possession of cocaine with intent to sell, after authorities discovered $750,000 worth of the drug in his Columbus, Ohio karate school. He subsequently served time in federal prison (The Federal Correctional Institution, Terre Haute, IN).
