= Institute for Clinical and Economic Review =

U.S. nonprofit organization

The Institute for Clinical and Economic Review (ICER) is a Boston-based independent nonprofit organization that seeks to place a value on medical care by providing comprehensive clinical and cost-effectiveness analyses of treatments, tests, and procedures.

ICER was founded in about 2005 by physician-researcher Steven D. Pearson. Until 2014 it concentrated on assessing health care costs (rather than evaluating drugs). It evaluates the cost-effectiveness of drugs in a similar way to the UK's NICE, and has come under some criticism from the drug industry. ICER has placed a monetary value on several prescription drugs since 2014. Insurers have used those evaluations to justify which drugs are approved or denied. The institution is funded by Arnold Ventures LLC (formerly the Laura and John Arnold Foundation), drug makers, insurers, and government grants.

== Threshold cost criteria ==
ICER uses a "value assessment framework" to decide prices for select medical treatments. The framework was last adjusted in 2020. ICER's framework considers total spending on medical treatments as well as the type of patient who will receive the treatment.

To find total spending, ICER estimates the amount of money available to be spent annually on new drugs and then divides that amount by the number of expected US Food and Drug Administration approvals to set an affordability benchmark.

To determine patient value, ICER uses quality-adjusted life year (QALY) to determine how much a drug can improve the quality of the patient's life. QALYs determine how much a treatment can improve a patient's life while subtracting value for any negative side effects. ICER also uses the Equal Value of Life Years Gained (evLYG) to determine if treatment adds years to the patient's life.

ICER's affordability calculations adjust for drugs targeting prevalent diseases and/or those presenting a significant clinical benefit by setting the threshold at double the available funds divided by the expected number of new drugs (approved by FDA).

Since 2016, ICER has valued one quality-adjusted life year as worth $150,000.

== Criticism ==
Since drugs that combat rarer diseases are typically spread over smaller patient pools, companies will often charge a higher price for the drug in order to recoup their investment. As a result, some critics argue ICER tends to report that these rare disease drugs are not worth the high cost listed for them, without taking into account the input of physicians, patients, or other societal factors when determining a drug's value. According to the Pioneer Institute, "A recent ICER review of two breakthrough treatments for Spinal Muscular Atrophy (SMA) concluded that neither therapy met 'traditional cost-effectiveness thresholds.'"

ICER has been criticized for being an "arbitrary, nontransparent, non-peer-reviewed report" which can determine whether a patient receives a treatment recommended by a doctor.

ICER's use of the QALY has left some concerned that less efficient drugs will be prioritized. Oxford University's Quarterly Journal of Medicine stated: "If a new treatment is less effective than standard therapy, but costs much less there will be a cost per QALY benefit in adopting it."

ICER is also seen as a watchdog for drug price hikes that are not backed by clinical evidence. ICER released a study in 2019 that reported, "In 2017 and 2018, out of nine identified drugs that had substantial price increases on top of already high current spending, seven drugs had no new important evidence to support their price increases. The net price increases on these seven drugs alone cost American insurers and patients an additional $4.8 billion over two years."

== QALY ==
QALY stands for Quality-Adjusted Life Year and it is one measurement system used by ICER to determine the value of a drug. One QALY is equal to one perfect year of health. Critics of the QALY argue that the measurement is too subjective to be used broadly. Critics also claim QALYs can be ableist or ageist because disabled or elderly individuals cannot have one year of perfect health based on its criteria. Some critics have sought to ban QALYs as a metric. On January 31, 2023, HR 485 was introduced, which would prohibit the use of QALYs. Currently QALYs are subject to a limited ban in the Medicare program, this bill would expand the ban to all federal programs. Proponents of the system agree that it may be imperfect, but consider it to be the best available measurement system for quality and quantity of life.

== evLYG ==
The Equal Value of Life Years Gained, or evLYG, is a measurement system proposed by ICER which measures how much a medical treatment can extend the life of the patient. The evLYG measures the cost of a treatment per life year gained regardless of the quality of life provided by that treatment. The metric was adopted in response to criticism that the QALY metric was too narrow, and that its focus on quality of life would lead to discrimination against the elderly and disabled.

Critics of the evLYG metric argue that the metric is too broad and doesn't account for nuance in patient conditions. Specifically, evLYG relies on generic patient reported outcomes when dealing with specific and unique situations. Critics also argue that the evLYG metric ignores additional dimensions of value, such as how a specific treatment may not add to a person's lifespan but could reduce the overall burden on the healthcare system, saving lives elsewhere.

== Drugs evaluated - reports issued ==
It issued a draft report that said Sovaldi wasn't worth the list price of about $84,000 a year.

As of May 2016 ICER published final reports on multiple myeloma and palliative care.

It has criticized the high price of drugs for osteoporosis, multiple sclerosis, PCSK9 cholesterol meds, and immuno-oncology therapies.

In 2017, it issued a controversial draft report on PARP inhibitors for ovarian cancer.

== Drug evaluations planned ==
A preliminary list of drugs to be evaluated includes rociletinib, AZD-9291, necitumumab, nivolumab, and pembrolizumab for small-cell lung cancer; fingolimod, dimethyl fumarate, teriflunomide, alemtuzumab, and daclizumab for multiple sclerosis; and ixekizumab and brodalumab for psoriasis or psoriatic arthritis.

== Advisory and governance boards ==
ICER's governing boards include various health experts, including several insurance executives.

Governance Board

- Ellen Andrews, Executive Director of the Connecticut Health Policy Project
- Carmella Bocchino, President and CEO of CRB Strategies
- Wendy Everett, Special Advisor for Network for Excellence in Health Innovation
- Ron Pollack, Chair Emeritus for Families USA
- Murray Ross, Vice President and Director of Kaiser Institute for Health Policy
- Lewis Sandy, Executive Vice President of Clinical Advancement for UnitedHealth
- Mark Skinner, President and CEO of Institute for Policy Advancement
- Anya Rader Wallack, Associate Director of Center for Evidence Synthesis in Health at Brown University

Advisory Board

- Robert W. Dubois, Chief Science Officer of the National Pharmaceutical Council
- Jon Gavras, Senior Vice President and Chief Medical Officer of Prime Therapeutics
- Colleen Haines, Chief Clinical Officer of IngenioRx
- Vivian Herrera, Executive Director and Head of Immunology & Dermatology and Medical Access at Novartis
- Kjel A. Johnson, Vice President of Specialty Strategy and Client Solutions at CVS Health
- Ron Preblick, Senior Director and Global Business Partner of Rare Blood Disorders at Sanofi
- Andreas Kuznik, Senior Director of Health Economics and Outcomes Research at Regeneron Pharmaceuticals
- Chris Leibman, Senior Vice President of Value and Access at Biogen
- Dave Macarios, Vice President of Global Evidence and Value Development at Allergan
- Martin Marciniak, Vice President of US Medical Affairs, Customer Engagement, Value, Evidence, and Outcomes at GlaxoSmithKline
- Kendra Martello, Senior Director of Public Policy, Government Affairs & Public Policy at Mallinckrodt
- Michael Sherman, Senior Vice President and Chief Medical Officer at Harvard Pilgrim Health Care
- David R. Strutton, Vice President of Global Pharmaceuticals and Policy Evidence Research at Merck & Co.
- Sean D. Sullivan, Professor and Dean at University of Washington School of Pharmacy
- Marcus Thygeson, Chief Health Officer of Bind Benefits
- John Watkins, Pharmacy Manager of Formulary Development at Premera Blue Cross
- David Weinstock, Professor of Medicine and Pediatrics at Harvard Medical School and Dana-Farber Cancer Institute

== See also ==
- Academy of Managed Care Pharmacy, an older US organization that evaluates drug cost effectiveness
