= Louis Preston Garrison =

American health economist (born 1950)

Emeritus Louis P. Garrison, Jr.
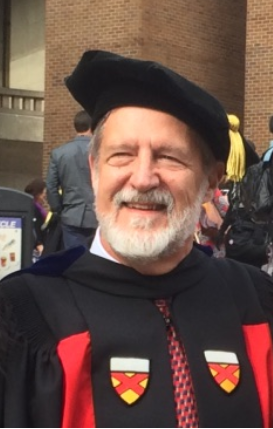
- Born: June 22, 1950 (age 76); Indiana, USA
- Citizenship: United States of America

Academic background
- Education: Stanford University (Ph.D.); Indiana University (B.S.)
- Doctoral advisor: Victor Fuchs
- Influences: Pharmacoeconomics

Academic work
- Discipline: health economics
- Institutions: University of Washington
- Website: sop.washington.edu/people/louis-garrison/

Louis Preston Garrison Jr. (born 1950) is an American health economist who has made significant contributions to pharmacoeconomics, pharmacogenomics and personalized medicine, regulatory benefit-risk analysis, insurance, pricing, reimbursement and risk-sharing agreements. He also made numerous contributions on the economic evaluation of pharmaceuticals, diagnostics, devices, surgical procedures, and vaccines, particularly as related to organ transplantation, influenza, measles, obesity, and cancer. Garrison has published over a hundred manuscripts in peer-reviewed journals and contributed to several book chapters.

== Education ==
Garrison received his B.A. in Economics at Indiana University and his Ph.D. in Economics at Stanford University. During his doctoral training, Garrison was mentored by Victor Fuchs, who is considered "the dean of health economists."

== Career ==
Garrison served as the president of the International Society for Pharmacoeconomics and Outcomes Research (2016–2017) and is Professor Emeritus at the University of Washington School of Pharmacy. Garrison's career began with 13 years in non-profit health policy research at the Battelle Memorial Institute Human Affairs Research Centers (Seattle), and at the Project HOPE Center for Health Affairs (Virginia), where he was the Director from 1989 to 1992. Following this, he worked as an economist in the pharmaceutical industry for 12 years. From 2002 to 2004, he was vice president and Head of Health Economics & Strategic Pricing in Hoffmann-La Roche Pharmaceuticals, and was based in Basel, Switzerland. He then joined the faculty at the University of Washington School of Pharmacy in 2004 until his retirement in 2017.

== Incentives to pharmaceutical innovation ==
Garrison argued that a major challenge to pharmaceutical innovation has been the misalignment of incentives. He further argued that the global product life cycle of oncology medications depended in large part to monopoly power associated with time-limited patent protection given by the Food and Drug Administration. Garrison highlighted that value is a dynamic and moving target and that pharmaceutical pricing should reward innovation based on the value created. Inflexible or fixed pricing schemes do not capture the dynamic value of pharmaceuticals, especially when considering the product life cycle. Moreover, Garrison argued that value creation through value capture would promote public goods through private markets with appropriate patent protection.

== Value of personalized medicine ==
The advent of personalized medicine prompted discussion on its value and reimbursement decision. Garrison and MJ Finley Austin used a standard insure-payer reimbursement framework to identify that health systems reforms are necessary to develop economic incentives for personalized medicine. Additionally, Garrison and Adrian Towse argued that reimbursement for innovative, patent-protected diagnostic and therapeutic products needs to be value-based and flexible. Garrison believed that a global perspective is necessary to share the cost of innovative medicines, which will result in dynamic efficiency and global public goods; and further argued that the high-cost of personalized medicine requires society to share the costs through efficient pricing and reimbursement strategies.

== Risk sharing agreements ==
Garrison also evaluated the use of Risk Sharing Agreements (RSA) between pharmaceutical companies and health care payers. RSAs are contracts between pharmaceutical companies and health care payers that link coverage reimbursement to pharmaceutical performance. Performance can be defined as financial-based and outcomes-based. Financial-based RSA has reimbursements tied to the market share and utilization of pharmaceutical. Whereas, outcomes-based RSA has reimbursements based on the drug's clinical/health outcomes. Garrison and colleagues reported that US health care payers expressed interest in financial-based RSA but were reluctant to implement outcomes-based RSA due to a lack of confidence. These barriers would need to be addressed before any nationwide RSA takes place between pharmaceutical companies and health care payers.

== Awards and recognition ==
In 2017, Garrison was selected as part of the PharmVOICE 100. Garrison was also honored by being inducted to New Albany High School Hall of Fame (2017), and being honored for his life-time achievements at the Pharmaceutical Outcomes Research and Policy Program 20th Anniversary Research Symposium hosted by University of Washington School of Pharmacy (2016).

== Legacy ==
Garrison and his wife established several funds at the University of Washington: the Garrison Family Fund for Global Health Economics Education, the Louis Sr. and Marilyn Garrison Endowed Prize in Health Policy and Economics; and the Penny Evans Fund for the University of Washington International Society for Pharmacoeconomics and Outcomes Research Student Chapter.
