= Primary Care Progress =

American nonprofit organization

Primary Care Progress, Inc.
- Founded: 2009
- Location: Cambridge, Massachusetts
- Website: primarycareprogress.org

Primary Care Progress (PCP) is a national nonprofit organization advocating for and facilitating the revitalization of primary care in the United States health care system. It trains and organizes an interprofessional network of care providers and trainees - doctors, nurses, nurse practitioners, pharmacists, physician assistants, and others. It is inspired by what a 2009 report by the Network for Excellence in Health Innovation (NEHI) described as a crisis in primary care delivery: an increased demand on primary care by older, sicker patients and a decreased supply of primary care practitioners.

Evidence shows primary care provides better care at lower cost, yet when compared to medical specialty disciplines, it is funded less in the United States than any other developed country. Primary care providers are generally overworked and underpaid compared to specialists, and many are disillusioned. This has resulted in fewer and fewer students choosing primary care training, and many providers retiring early or switching careers.

In response, PCP offers a community for primary care providers, trainees, and faculty to connect and support each other. It provides relational leadership development training and coaching for building health care teams, improving primary care delivery, and organizing for change. PCP focuses on students and trainees through their network of over 50 chapters at health professions institutions around the country. Chapters' initiatives range from launching student-run free clinics to changing curricula to organizing their local primary care community.

PCP partners with Jeffrey Brenner’s Camden Coalition of Healthcare Providers and the Association of American Medical Colleges on the Interprofessional Student Hotspotting Project, an initiative providing teams of health professions students with the knowledge and opportunity to work with high-risk patients to improve their care.

== Media coverage ==
In 2010, PCP president and co-founder Dr. Andrew Morris-Singer discussed on CNN the crisis in primary care and what is being done to address it. PCPs’ role in the creation of Harvard Medical School’s Center for Primary Care - which included a series of town hall meetings with hundreds of attendees - was described in a Harvard Gazette article.

In 2011, PCP was featured in the American College of Physicians’ Impact Newsletter as a “new national organization dedicated to engaging local communities to promote primary care, innovate in care delivery and prepare the next generation of leaders in primary care” by “building a grassroots network of advocates who share the vision of a health care system built on a robust foundation of primary care.”

In 2012, President Morris-Singer wrote a blog post for KevinMD.com calling for a primary care “workforce surge,” and another for the Health Care Blog on revitalizing the primary care training “pipeline” through a multifaceted approach to overcome the financial, academic, cultural, and political challenges. He was also featured in a New York Times article on initiatives encouraging students to consider primary care careers.

Representing PCP, in 2013, Dr. Morris-Singer was a panelist for a Congressional briefing on primary care. PCP was also featured in 2013 articles on the primary care crisis by the Associated Press and the Association of Health Care Journalists.

In 2014, MedPage Today published a piece about Primary Care Progress’ grassroots efforts, while the Atlantic’s story “Why I’m Becoming a Primary Care Doctor” included insight from President Morris-Singer on the stigmatization of primary care careers.

New England Public Radio highlighted the work of PCP in two 2015 pieces about the future of primary care.
