= John D. Arnold =

American philanthropist (born 1974)

John Arnold
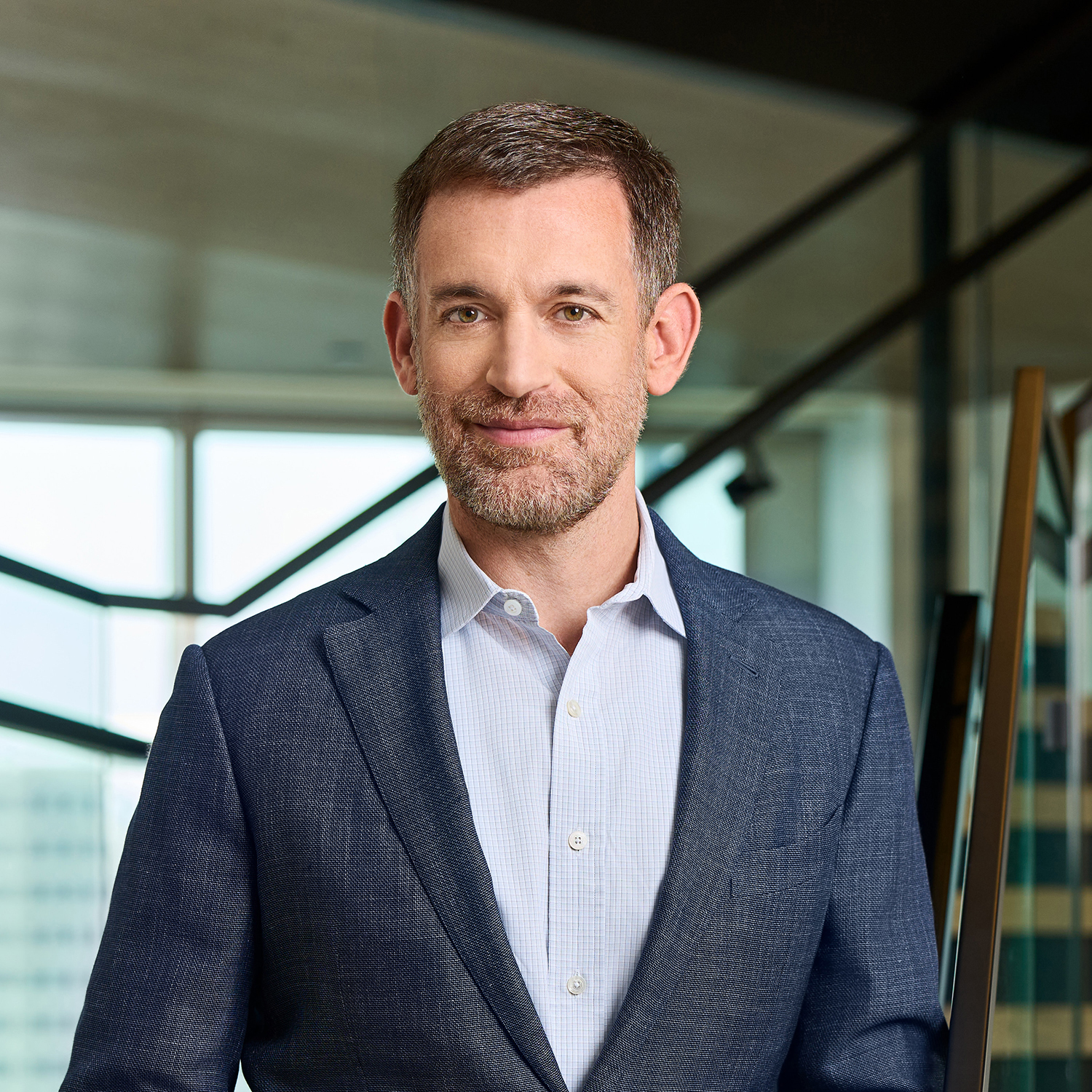
- Arnold in 2025.
- Born: John Douglas Arnold; 1974 (age 51–52); Dallas, Texas, U.S.
- Education: Vanderbilt University (BS)
- Occupations: Philanthropist and Co-Founder of Arnold Ventures LLC
- Spouse: Laura Muñoz
- Children: 3

John Douglas Arnold (born 1974) is an American billionaire, former energy trader, hedge fund manager, and philanthropist. He began his career at Enron in 1995, eventually becoming head of natural-gas derivatives trading. Arnold's trading operation was credited with generating approximately $750 million in profits for Enron in 2001, the year the company collapsed.

As Enron approached bankruptcy in late 2001, Arnold received an $8 million retention bonus intended to keep him at the company during its proposed merger with Dynegy, one of the largest retention payments made during Enron's final weeks.

Following Enron's bankruptcy, Arnold founded Centaurus Advisors in 2002, a Houston-based hedge fund specializing in energy trading. Contemporary and later accounts reported that Arnold used his $8 million Enron bonus as part of the capital with which he established Centaurus. The fund subsequently became one of the most successful energy-focused hedge funds of its era. In 2007, Arnold became the youngest billionaire in the United States. He closed Centaurus in 2012 and returned outside investors' capital.

Arnold subsequently shifted his focus primarily to philanthropy through Arnold Ventures. He is also involved in energy investment and infrastructure and serves on the board of directors of Meta Platforms.

== Early life ==
Arnold was raised in Dallas, Texas, and he was the younger of two sons. His mother was a teacher and would later work as an accountant at Centaurus. His father was a corporate lawyer and died when Arnold was 18. At 14, he started his first company selling collectible sports cards called Blue Chip Cards. He completed high school at Hillcrest High School in 1992.

A 1995 graduate of Vanderbilt University, he completed a degree in mathematics and economics in three years. He is a member of Lambda Chi Alpha.

== Career ==
After college, he began his career at Enron as an oil analyst. In 1996, less than a year after starting at Enron, he moved to oversee the trading of natural gas derivatives. His trading book is credited with making $750 million for Enron in 2001 and he was rewarded with the largest bonus in Enron history, some $8 million. His former colleagues dubbed him "king of natural gas." Arnold was deposed in May 2005 by Antara Resources regarding his possible manipulation of information used for gas price indexes.

He then founded Centaurus, a hedge fund, with his previous year's bonus and two other investors in 2002. He was widely quoted for his viewpoints on the industry by a government commission.

During the collapse of Amaranth Advisors, Centaurus is widely credited as being one of the major players on the other side of their position, returning as much as 150% in 2005. August 2008, Centaurus acquired around 10% of the shares of National Coal Corporation (NCOC).

In 2009, Arnold gave a public speech to the U.S. Commodity Futures Trading Commission (CFTC), in which he opposed limits on financially settled trading positions but supported limits in the physical energy futures as they near expiration. Arnold announced his retirement from running the hedge fund on May 2, 2012. Centaurus had an average annualized return in excess of 100% across this 10 year run.

=== Other interests ===
In 2019, Arnold became the chairman of Houston's 2026 bid for the FIFA World Cup.

== Philanthropy ==
Arnold started donating to the Knowledge Is Power Program (KIPP) in 2004 with a gift of $30,000 which was then based in Houston, and two years later he and his wife pledged $10 million to help KIPP expand to other cities. Other multi-million gifts followed to other education programs, for example to Washington, D.C. city schools for merit pay, to Teach for America, and to StudentsFirst. Arnold has also given to The City Fund, an organization focused on growing the number of charter schools in the USA, and its political arm, Public School Allies.

The Laura and John Arnold Foundation was a private foundation founded by Arnold and his wife Laura. The organization was founded in 2008. In 2010, the Arnolds were original signatories of the Giving Pledge, a pledge by some high-net-worth individuals to donate the majority of their wealth to philanthropic causes during their lifetimes. They do not plan to continue their foundation after death, instead focusing on what it can accomplish within their lifetimes. From 2010–2013, the Arnolds were heavily involved in the Innocence Project which led to their interest in criminal reform. The Foundation is focused on evidence-backed giving for systematic change.

In 2013, the Arnolds donated $10 million as a private donation to the National Head Start Association after the United States federal government shutdown of 2013 had closed the pre-K Head Start programs.

In October 2018, it was reported that Arnold had spent more than $100 million in health-care related grants since 2014, with a particular focus on reducing pharmaceutical drug costs. Arnold funds Institute for Clinical and Economic Review (ICER), a nonprofit that created a formula to price drugs. Those who support ICER’s formula believe it could lower prices while critics argue that the formula is discriminator toward the elderly and those with disabilities or rare diseases. Arnold also has been an influential supporter of Democrats’ efforts to pass a drug-price reform bill.

In 2019, the organization was transformed into a limited-liability company composed of the former foundation, a donor-advised fund, and the Action Now Initiative advocacy organization, effectively combining philanthropy, research, policy, and advocacy efforts. The new entity is known as Arnold Ventures LLC with the charter "to remove barriers between data and decisive action, working swiftly across the policy-change spectrum." Arnold has said that he uses Arnold Ventures to fund “orphan areas” that have previously not received much philanthropic capital, with the idea of trying to answer questions that public policymakers may have about those topics.

In 2019, Arnold spoke out against donor-advised funds (DAF), criticizing them for delaying charitable giving and promoting giving to institutions that are less likely to need the money. He proposed that foundations and DAFs should spend at least 7% annually, which would result in billions of dollars more being given to charities, and that DAFs should be legally held to an annual minimum distribution.

In 2020, Forbes deputy wealth editor Jennifer Wang awarded Arnold a perfect philanthropy score of 5, the highest possible rating; placing him among an exclusive group of just ten Forbes 400 members, alongside Warren Buffett, George Soros, Eli Broad, and others who have each given away at least 20% of their fortune.

== Controversies ==
Post-Enron, Arnold was deposed in May 2005 by Antara Resources regarding alleged manipulation of information used for gas price indexes. In response to questions about market manipulation, Arnold invoked his right against self-incrimination under the Fifth Amendment.

In 2016, the Arnolds faced controversy after donating $360,000 (in two separate donations, both totaling over $100,000) to the police department of Baltimore, Maryland to fund an aerial surveillance program run by Ohio-based company Persistent Surveillance Systems (technology based off of Kestrel systems used in Afghanistan. There was major media fallout after it was revealed in August that the police department commenced the program in January without disclosing their receipt of the donations, the start of the program, or the fact that they were surveilling Baltimore residents; the police kept this from both the public and the rest of Maryland's government.

Arnold Ventures LLC has invited criticism with its involvement in many controversial areas. They are on record as agreeing with some of the critiques and focus on partnering with organizations to maximize their impact without undue influence. The former foundation was sued over a pre-trial web tool by the family of a victim who was murdered, but the District Court and a U.S. Appellate Court dismissed the complaint.

Arnold Ventures' 2020 grant to trial aerial surveillance hardware by the Baltimore Police Department (this time, publicly) was subject to legal challenges. This would later lead to an extended court case; the Fourth Circuit Court of Appeals would rule the surveillance system a violation of the Fourth Amendment of the United States Constitution.

Arnold’s foundation, Arnold Ventures, created a Public Safety Assessment which gave recently arrested individuals a score to determine their flight risk and potential bail. The NAACP and ACLU have criticized the Arnold PSA because they believe risk assessment tools actually increased the number of prisoners under the guise of criminal justice reform.

Arnold received an $8 million bonus from Enron just before the company filed for bankruptcy. It was the largest cash bonus ever distributed by the company. He was described as "unapologetic" for his success in Enron’s final days. Arnold was not criminally charged with any wrongdoing at Enron, but he was named in a bankruptcy lawsuit by other Enron staff.

Arnold has been accused of pushing for pension reform in response to a lawsuit the California state pension system, CalPERS, filed against Enron. Through his foundation, Arnold has aggressively promoted pension reform in the state of California based on a study his foundation conducted with Pew that failed to mention that Enron or the overall financial crisis contributed to the shortfall.

John Arnold and his brother Matthew tore down historical homes in the River Oaks neighborhood of Houston which led to criticism by architectural conservationists.

== Personal life ==
Arnold is married to Laura Elena (Muñoz) Arnold, a Yale graduate who had worked as a mergers-and-acquisitions attorney and had co-founded an oil exploration company in Houston. They have three children.
