= Fred Lazarus Jr. =

American businessman (1884–1973)

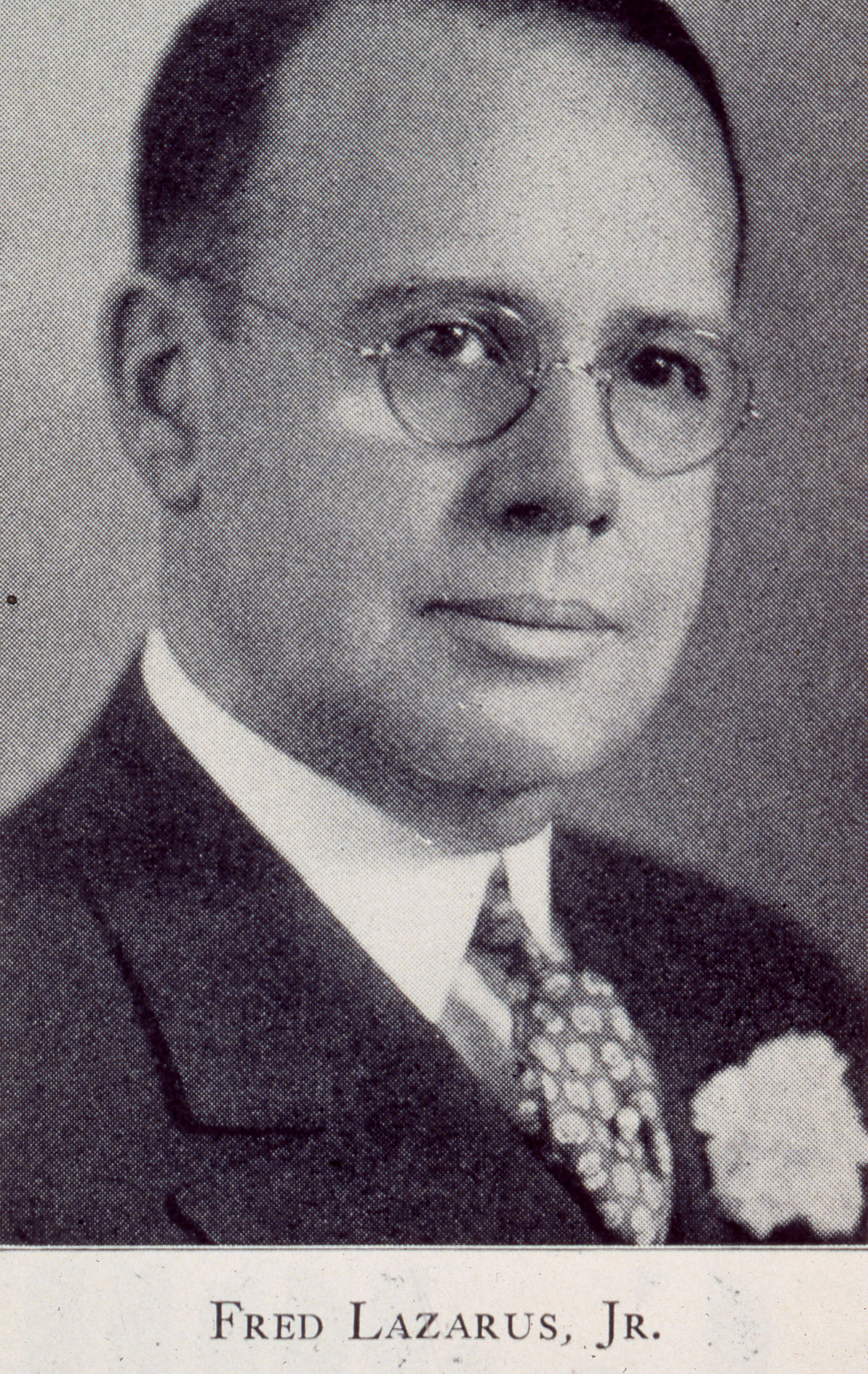
- Born: Fred R. Lazarus Jr. October 29, 1884; Columbus, Ohio, U.S.
- Died: May 27, 1973 (aged 88); Cincinnati, Ohio, U.S.
- Occupations: Store worker Businessman; Retail Merchant
- Known for: Founder of Federated Department Stores
- Spouse(s): Meta Marx (until her death); Celia Kahn Rosenthal
- Children: 4 including Maurice Lazarus
- Relatives: Simon Lazarus (grandfather)

Fred R. Lazarus Jr. (October 29, 1884 – May 27, 1973) was an American retail merchant and one of the founders of Federated Department Stores, which became Macy's, Inc.

== Early life ==
Fred Lazarus Jr. was born to a Jewish family on October 29, 1884, the son of Rose (née Eichberg) and Fred Lazarus.

Fred Lazarus Jr. briefly attended Ohio State University, but dropped out at the age of 18 to work full-time in the family's store. The F. & R. Lazarus & Co. store was founded in 1851 by his grandfather Simon Lazarus, a German-Jewish immigrant. The Lazarus family pioneered many retail firsts such as the concept of "one low price" (in which no bargaining was required); theirs was also the first department store with escalators and the first air conditioned store in the country.

== Businessman career ==
In 1928, F.&R. Lazarus & Co. purchased The John Shillito Company department store in Cincinnati. In the summer of 1929, months before the Wall Street crash of 1929, Lazarus met with Walter N. Rothschild from Abraham & Straus of Brooklyn and Louis E. Kirstein from Filene's of Boston on Rothschild's yacht in Long Island Sound. The three businessmen agreed to merge their stores and form Federated Department Stores, as a holding company of which "Mr. Fred" was the chairman. Bloomingdale's of New York joined in 1930. Under his leadership, Federated eventually became the largest department store company in the United States.

Fred Lazarus Jr. earned a reputation for innovation that made his family 'the first name in retail,' according to a 1961 Forbes article. In the late 1920s, 'Mr. Fred' instituted an administrative division of labor that placed department managers in charge of buying and selling all of the merchandise in their particular department. This brought a spirit of entrepreneurship to the individual departments in each store. In 1934, Lazarus revolutionized retail clothing sales when he adopted a French merchandising technique in which apparel was arranged according to size, rather than by color, price, or brand. The system became an industry standard. In 1939, Mr. Fred convinced President Franklin D. Roosevelt to move the Thanksgiving holiday to the fourth Thursday in November instead of the last Thursday in November that year. The calendar change extended the Christmas shopping season, giving retailers more time to sell at their busiest time of year.

== Personal life ==
Lazarus married twice. In 1911, he married Meta Marx; she died in 1932. They had four children, including Maurice Lazarus. In 1935, he married Celia Kahn Rosenthal.
