= Sean D. Sullivan =

American health economist

- Born: 30 September 1960 (age 66); San Jose, CA, USA
- Citizenship: United States of America

Academic background
- Education: University of California Berkeley (Ph.D.); University of Texas, Austin (MSc.); Oregon State University College of Pharmacy (BSc.Pharm.)
- Doctoral advisor: Teh-wei Hu
- Influences: Pharmacoeconomics, Health Economics

Academic work
- Discipline: Health Economics
- Institutions: University of Washington
- Website: sop.washington.edu/people/sean-d-sullivan/

Sean D. Sullivan (born 1960) is an American health economist and professor who is a member of the National Academies of Sciences, Engineering, and Medicine, and Fellow of the American Association for the Advancement of Science (AAAS). He has contributed to pharmacoeconomics, health technology assessment, decision sciences, drug pricing, value-based insurance design, and health coverage and reimbursement decisions.

Sullivan was dean of the University of Washington School of Pharmacy from 2014 to 2022 and past president of ISPOR.

== Education ==
Sullivan received his Bachelors of Pharmacy from Oregon State University, College of Pharmacy in 1983, Masters of Science from the University of Texas, Austin in 1986, and his Doctor of Philosophy from the University of California Berkeley in 1992. During his doctoral training, Sullivan was advised by Teh-wei Hu, a health economist at the University of California Berkeley.

== Career ==
Sullivan was an Affiliate Assistant Professor at the College of Professional Studies, University of California San Francisco and Visiting Instructor at the School of Pharmacy, University of the Pacific. After his doctoral training, Sullivan took a position as Assistant Professor at the Schools of Pharmacy and Public Health/Community Medicine, University of Washington eventually reaching the rank of Full Professor. Sullivan was the past Stergachis Family Endowed Professor and Director of The Comparative Health Outcomes, Policy, and Economics (CHOICE) Institute, Associate Dean of Research, Graduate Education and New Initiatives at University of Washington School of Pharmacy, and Dean and Chief Academic Officer at University of Washington School of Pharmacy. Sullivan is currently Full Professor at University of Washington School of Pharmacy and University of Washington School of Public Health, and Visiting Professor at London School of Economics and Political Science.

== Research ==
The Academy of Managed Care Pharmacy (AMCP) Dossier, a comprehensive document containing information about the effectiveness, safety, and economic impact of a pharmaceutical agent, is used by healthcare decision-makers to inform them on policies associated with formulary coverage and price negotiation. Sullivan was instrumental in its development along with Dell Mather, Deborah Atherly, Linda Sturm and John Watkins. Drawing inspiration from the Australian guidelines for informing drug coverage by the Pharmaceutical Benefits Advisory Committee (PBAC), they developed the framework for managed care organizations to standardize their decision-making process to incorporate clinical and economic outcomes, which included product description, place in therapy, comparator products, therapy intervention framework, supporting clinical data, supporting pharmacoeconomic data, system impact assessments-costs-outcomes, overall assessment. This led to the first AMCP Dossier Format version 1.0, which was published in October 2000. Since its inception, the AMCP Dossier for Formulary Submissions has been widely used by managed care organizations and formulary managers to inform them on healthcare decisions regarding formulary coverage and price negotiations. In recognition of his contributions, Sullivan was elected to the National Academy of Medicine in 2020.

Sullivan and colleagues were one of the first to evaluate the effectiveness of value-based formulary design on large healthcare systems to identify high-value interventions that insurers would be willing to pay out.

In 2022, President Biden signed into law the Inflation Reduction Act (Public Law 117-169), which gave Medicare (United States) the ability to directly negotiate with pharmaceutical manufactures for some of the costliest drugs on the Part B and D plans. Sullivan and colleagues wrote a series of papers discussing the impact of this law on pharmaceutical pricing. In particular, they identified the complexities with Medicare's decision on price negotiations and a offered transparent and systematic process to arrive at an initial price offering.

== Awards and recognition ==
Sullivan has been a member of the National Academy of Medicine since 2020 and a fellow of the American Association for the Advancement of Science since 2022. Sullivan was awarded the Outstanding Alumnus Award from Oregon State University in 2019, the David Almquist Award from the Washington State Pharmacy Association in 2016, the Career Research Achievement Award from the American Pharmacists Association in 2015, and the Steven G. Avey Award from the Academy of Managed Care Pharmacy in 2014.
