= Steven Pearson =

Steven Pearson is an American physician, bioethicist, and the Founder and President of the non-profit health policy and comparative effectiveness research organization Institute for Clinical and Economic Review in Boston, MA. He conducts research on cost-effectiveness analysis and healthcare technology assessment. He is also a lecturer in Harvard's Department of Population Medicine and a member of the National Institutes of Health (NIH) Comparative Effectiveness Research Steering Committee.

== Career and education ==
Pearson founded the Institute for Clinical and Economic Review at the Massachusetts General Hospital's Institute for Technology Assessment in 2006. Prior to that, he was a fellow at America's Health Insurance Plans (AHIP). He also received an Atlantic Fellowship and was a Senior Fellow in the United Kingdom at the National Institute for Health and Care Excellence of the UK's National Health Service. Additionally he has been a member of the Coverage and Analysis Group at the Centers for Medicare and Medicaid Services (CMS) in the United States. He is the author of the book No Margin, No Mission: Health Care Organizations and the Quest for Ethical Excellence, published by Oxford University Press along with James Sabin and Ezekiel Emanuel.

Pearson's medical degree is from the UCSF School of Medicine and he completed a residency in internal medicine at Brigham and Women’s Hospital. In addition to a medical degree, he holds a Master of Science Degree in Health Policy and Management from the Harvard School of Public Health.

Pearson has authored many articles related to health policy debates and issues at the national level as well as articles that speak to cost effectiveness of specific health care technologies. In 2010, he co-authored an article in Health Affairs with Memorial Sloan Kettering's Peter Bach that stated "Medicare must find new ways to achieve cost control without limiting access to beneficial services."
