= ProQR =

Dutch biotechnology company

- Company type: Public
- Traded as: Nasdaq: PRQR
- Industry: Biotechnology Pharmaceuticals
- Founded: 2012
- Headquarters: Leiden
- Key people: Daniel de Boer (CEO)
- Products: RNA therapeutics
- Number of employees: 150
- Website: http://www.proqr.com/

ProQR Therapeutics NV (NASDAQ: PRQR) is a Dutch biotechnology company based in Leiden, the Netherlands, with a presence in Cambridge, Massachusetts, US. The company was funded in 2012 by chief executive officer (CEO) Daniel A. de Boer. It specializes in the development of RNA therapeutics using its RNA editing platform technology called Axiomer.

== History ==
ProQR was founded in 2012 by chief executive officer (CEO) Daniel A. de Boer and co-founders Henri Termeer, Dinko Valerio and Gerard Platenburg.

The initial pipeline of the company was to develop small-molecule drugs or gene therapy that would treat cystic fibrosis (CF). Positive proof of concept (PoC) was achieved in 2016 with the clinical trial of the molecule QR-010 targeting the gene coding for cystic fibrosis transmembrane conductance regulator (CFTCR) in patients. Subsequently, the company expanded its pipeline into treating other rare diseases, including diseases of the eye.

In 2017, a spin-out of ProQR named Amylon Therapeutics was established in Leiden with the focus on the development of therapies for the central nervous system.

In 2021, ProQR announced a collaboration with Eli Lilly and Company on the Axiomer technology focused on "genetic disorders in the liver and nervous system". They signed a deal under which ProQR would receive US$50 million ($20 million upfront) and an equity investment of $30 million. The relationship between the two firms "deepened" in 2022 with expansion of the indications engagement and a $75 million cash infusion which included an equity stake.

In 2022, the company announced it would focus exclusively on advancing its RNA editing technology.

== Projects ==
ProQR is an RNA editing company targeting genetic diseases by focusing on making changes to the RNA. The firm's RNA editing technology, called Axiomer can make targeted single nucleotide changes to RNA. ProQR's proprietary Axiomer technology is based on short strands of synthetic RNA called editing oligonucleotides, or EONs. EONs are designed to specifically bind to the target (single stranded) RNA and mimic the double stranded structure that normally attracts an enzyme called Adenosine Deaminase Acting on RNA (ADAR). An EON can attract ADAR to a specific location in an RNA to make an A-to-I edit. This technology can be used to correct an RNA with a disease-causing mutation back to a normal RNA, or change a protein so that it will have a new function that helps prevent or treat disease.

The company's pipeline as of 2023 includes discovery stage programs addressing areas of high unmet medical need: AX-0810 for Cholestatic Diseases targeting NTCP, and AX-1412 for Cardiovascular Disease targeting B4GALT1.

== See also ==
- List of pharmaceutical companies
- List of companies of the Netherlands
