= Arnold Ventures =

American philanthropy company

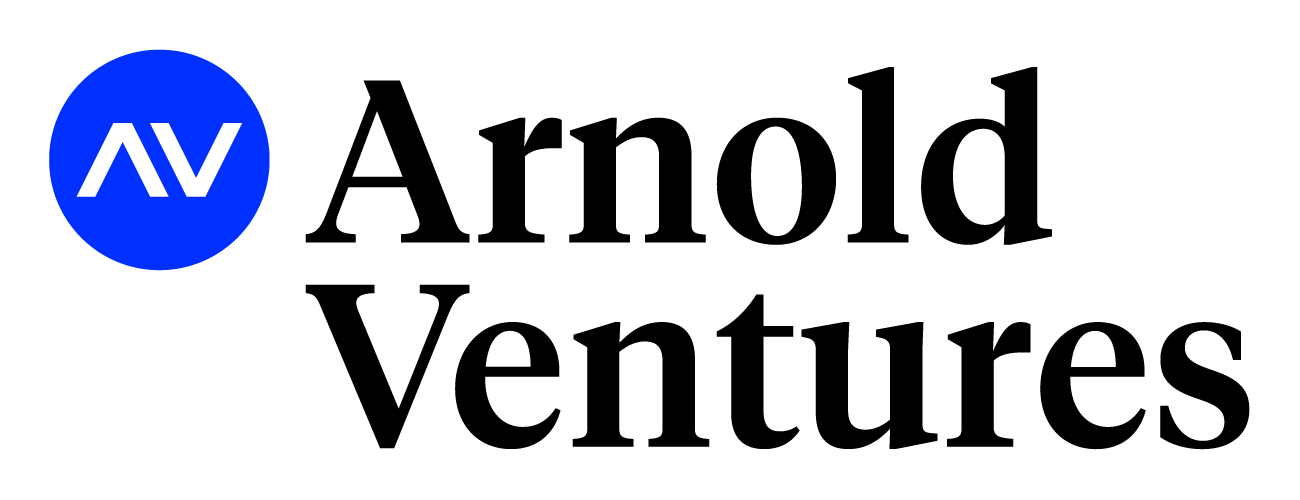
- Founded: 2008
- Founder: John D. Arnold; Laura Arnold
- Type: LLC
- Key people: John D. Arnold; Laura Arnold; Kelli Rhee
- Revenue: $687 million (2023)
- Expenses: $181 million (2023)
- Endowment: $4.31 billion
- Website: www.arnoldventures.org

Arnold Ventures LLC (formerly known as the Laura and John Arnold Foundation) is an American company that is the philanthropic vehicle of billionaires John D. Arnold and Laura Arnold. As of 2023, the organization had $4.31 billion in assets. Arnold Ventures makes grants in areas including education, criminal justice, health, infrastructure and public finance.

== History ==
The Laura and John Arnold Foundation was initially created as a philanthropic organization, but was restructured as a limited liability company and renamed Arnold Ventures in January 2019. The organization's LLC structure is intended to allow it to operate with more flexibility.

The Arnolds were among the first to sign The Giving Pledge in 2010, a commitment by high-net-worth individuals to donate a significant portion of their wealth to philanthropic causes during their lifetimes.

In a 2018 article in Texas Monthly, it was reported that the organization had spent over $1 billion since its inception.

== Areas of focus ==
The Arnolds apply an investment management approach to philanthropy, targeting a significant portion of their giving toward high-risk efforts with the potential to drive long-term change, while also supporting established institutions to sustain their ongoing work.

=== Crime ===
In March 2019, Arnold Ventures announced the creation of the National Partnership for Pretrial Justice, aimed at bringing together stakeholders from various sectors affected by pretrial policies. Arnold Ventures also supports the Council on Criminal Justice, a bipartisan group formed in 2019 to improve the criminal justice system. The Council's initial projects included exploring incarceration trends by race and gender and examining the impact of the 1994 Crime Bill.

In the same year, the foundation provided $9.8 million for 17 research grants awarded by the National Collaborative on Gun Violence Research. These grants are funding studies on topics such as background check laws, the role of firearms in domestic violence, gun-carrying by high-risk youth, and police training for high-stakes situations.

Arnold Ventures provides funding for the Real-Time Crime Index, which compiles crime data from approximately 350 law enforcement agencies, focusing on the largest ones. While the Federal Bureau of Investigation includes more comprehensive data, it only releases regular crime reports on an annual basis. RTCI aims to make public aggregated information about crime more frequently.

==== Data-Driven Justice ====
The foundation funded Data-Driven Justice, a program initiated by the Obama administration in 2016 to identify repeat low-level offenders with substance abuse or mental health issues and provide targeted interventions. In 2018, the foundation pledged $1.6 million for pilot programs in Middlesex County, Massachusetts; Long Beach, California; and Johnson County, Iowa. In May 2018, the foundation announced $4.1 million in grants to help communities address the needs of "frequent utilizers"—individuals who frequently cycle between jails and hospitals.

In 2011, the Vice President of Criminal Justice at the then-LJAF, former New Jersey Attorney General Anne Milgram, led the development of a risk assessment tool called the Public Safety Assessment (PSA) for use in pretrial release decisions. The PSA has been the subject of controversy, including a 2017 lawsuit brought by a family whose son was allegedly murdered by a man granted pretrial release based on the PSA. In 2020, a U.S. Appellate Court upheld the dismissal of the complaint.

In 2016, the foundation donated $360,000 to a trial of continuous aerial surveillance in Baltimore, Maryland, using drones. The project, funded by the LLC, was implemented without the knowledge of local authorities, leading to legal challenges and public outcry.

==== Prison violence and health ====
In 2019, the foundation committed $17 million in grants to study the effectiveness of prisons in the U.S. as part of the criminal justice system.

In June 2020, Arnold Ventures donated $2.7 million to the University of California, Irvine (UCI) to study the sources and consequences of prison violence in seven states. The goal of the three-year study is to develop evidence-based strategies to reduce and prevent violence. The participating states are Arizona, Colorado, Massachusetts, Ohio, Oregon, Pennsylvania, and Texas.

As of April 2021, the organization had committed $7.8 million to COVID-19-related criminal justice grants, supporting initiatives such as alternatives to arrest, pretrial reforms, and the release of vulnerable inmates.

=== Education ===
In May 2012, Reuters reported that the Laura and John Arnold Foundation had committed $20 million over five years to an initiative called StudentsFirst, led by Michelle Rhee, former head of the Washington, D.C. public school system.

On June 26, 2012, the foundation launched the ERIN Project, a tool for analyzing the national K-12 education landscape.

Arnold Ventures partnered with other organizations to create The City Fund in 2018, a nonprofit focused on improving public schools using the portfolio model. Under this model, school systems invest in schools that deliver good results and close or change those that do not. The City Fund raised nearly $200 million in its first year.

In March 2020, Arnold Ventures gave $3 million to The City Fund to fund schools during the coronavirus pandemic. The money was distributed among the 14 cities where the group has active grants.

In 2025, the organization provided a $35.6 million grant to fund a program in the North Carolina Community College System aimed at helping low-income students complete their studies if they are enrolled in programs with areas of study related to in-demand careers in the state. The NC Community Colleges Boost program was launched in 2025. It was based on a program developed by the City University of New York. The program included financial support for college-related expenses and support from academic advisors. Arnold Ventures also matched state funding to launch a similar program in two Colorado community colleges in 2025.

=== Public finance and democracy ===
In 2016 and 2018, the foundation joined other donors in providing $40 million to end gerrymandering and implement open primaries and ranked choice voting. In 2018, Arnold Ventures partnered with six organizations to sponsor an independent committee of scholars to conduct research on Facebook’s role in elections and democracy. The Social Science Research Council oversaw the research proposal selection and peer-review process.

The foundation has funded various politically-oriented 501(c)4 organizations. Many focus on tax and retirement policies.

LJAF’s pension reform efforts have been controversial. However, the foundation's goal has been to identify failed systems and propose viable alternatives. Even critics acknowledge the need for reform. In 2014, public pension systems faced shortfalls exceeding $1 trillion, contributing to the bankruptcy filings of two cities in California and Michigan.

In July 2014, the Arnold Foundation donated $2.8 million to the Center for Public Integrity to support a project focused on state campaign finance. The foundation has also funded think tanks and research institutes focused on public pension issues, including the libertarian Reason Foundation and Boston College’s Center for Retirement Research. In 2016, the foundation and unions in Arizona supported a ballot measure that reduced cost-of-living payments to retired police and firefighters.

=== Healthcare ===
Arnold Ventures work in the healthcare space has been focused primarily on researching ways to reduce both government spending and healthcare costs for Americans. AV has financially supported organizations developing policy changes intended to bring down the cost of drugs and medical care in various states. The organization has also funded research on the effects of hospital consolidation on health costs.

By 2020, Arnold Ventures had donated $347 million to health care initiatives, including $5.67 million to the Center for Healthcare Transparency, $23.19 million to the Nutrition Science Initiative, and $1.67 million to the Research Triangle Institute. Arnold Ventures was one of three organizations that invested in Civica RX, a nonprofit focused on reducing drug costs. Fifty large hospital systems partnered with Civica RX.

Arnold Ventures donated $27.6 million to the Institute for Clinical and Economic Review (ICER), accounting for 69% of its funding. ICER conducts cost analyses of prescription drugs and medical procedures using metrics like the quality-adjusted life year (QALY) and Equal Value of Life Years Gained (evLYG). Arnold Ventures’ work through ICER has been praised for standardizing drug pricing but has faced criticism for potentially limiting investment in treatments for elderly patients or those with rare diseases.

In January 2021, the organization helped fund the Action Collaborative on Countering the U.S. Opioid Epidemic, formed by the National Academy of Medicine and the Aspen Institute to address the risks posed by the COVID-19 pandemic to people with substance use disorders and chronic pain.

=== Infrastructure ===
In May 2023, Arnold Ventures launched a program that it said would fund research, policy development, and advocacy to help the United States build housing, transportation, and energy infrastructure faster and at lower cost. The organization was a partner in "Energy Superabundance," a Western Governors' Association initiative led by Utah governor Spencer Cox. Colorado Newsline described Arnold Ventures as a leading funder of causes associated with the abundance movement. The organization has also funded a statewide housing strategy for Arkansas that Groundwork, a housing policy group affiliated with the Northwest Arkansas Council, began developing in 2026.

=== Partnerships for Proven Programs ===
In March 2025, Arnold Ventures partnered with Oklahoma Governor Kevin Stitt to launch a $10 million matching initiative focused on expanding evidence-based programs for children and families. The partnership will initially focus on community-driven programs, such as Oklahoma's "Be A Neighbor" initiative.

=== Research integrity ===
One of the first projects funded by the foundation was research into obesity, inspired by John Arnold's interest after hearing an interview with Gary Taubes on the EconTalk podcast. This led to a $4.7 million seed grant to the Nutrition Science Initiative (NuSI), a nonprofit co-founded by Taubes and Peter Attia to investigate the causes of obesity. The foundation later promised an additional $35.5 million. It also funds The Nutrition Coalition, which advocates for changes in how the Dietary Guidelines for America are formulated.

The foundation provided a $5.25 million grant to launch the Center for Open Science, followed by an additional $10 million in funding by 2017. The Center has undertaken reproducibility projects to confirm the validity of published scientific research.

The foundation also funded the launch of the Meta-Research Innovation Center at Stanford at Stanford University, led by John Ioannidis and Steven Goodman, to study ways to improve scientific research; and supported the AllTrials initiative co-led by Ben Goldacre.

As of 2017, Arnold Ventures had given around $80 million in grants under its "Research Integrity" initiative.

=== Sports betting ===
In 2026, Arnold Ventures provided the American Institute for Boys and Men with $2 million for the purposes of starting a policy group focused on sports betting. The organization also provided another $2.6 million toward research in this area, with the goal of providing policymakers with the data they need in order to regulate sports betting effectively. This research includes studies on the effects of gambling and gambling advertisements on bettors' families, financial wellbeing, and mental health.
