= Warren G. Magnuson Health Sciences Center =

Coordinates: 47.652011°N 122.31239°W

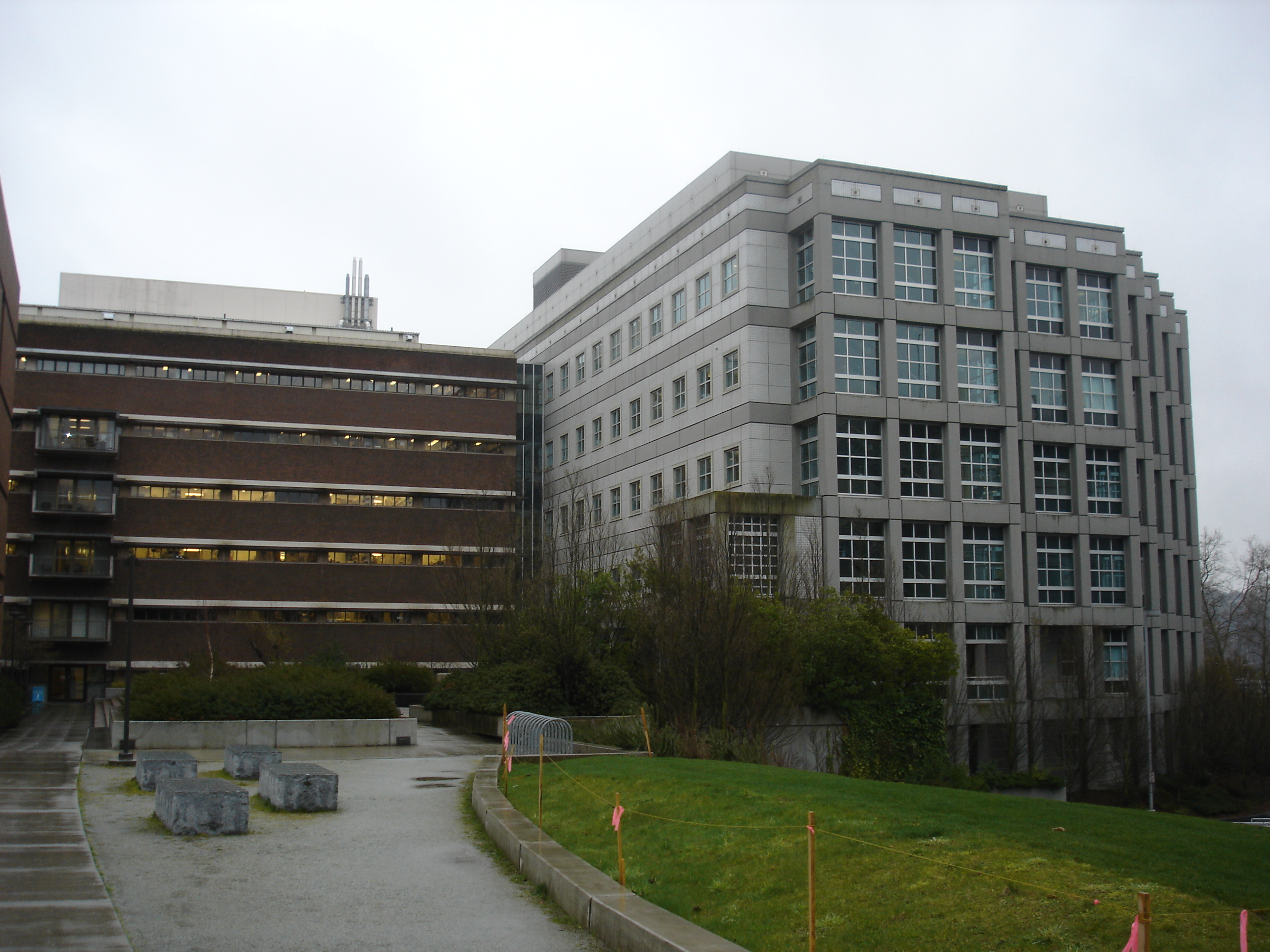
J and K Wings viewed from the green roof of the Foege Building loading dock

The Warren G. Magnuson Health Sciences Center is a university hospital part of the University of Washington campus in Seattle and one of the largest buildings in the United States with a total floor area of 5.8 million square feet (540,000 m^{2}). Although the building is made up of over 20 wings built over more than 50 years, the interior hallways are fully connected. The Magnuson Health Sciences Building is also referred to as the Health Sciences Building or Health Sciences Complex.

== Uses ==
Wings denoted by double letters (AA, BB, NN, SP, etc.) house a teaching hospital, the University of Washington Medical Center. Wings denoted with a single letter (A, B, T, etc.) house a variety of health-related academic disciplines including the University of Washington School of Dentistry, the University of Washington School of Medicine, the University of Washington School of Pharmacy, the University of Washington School of Public Health, and the University of Washington School of Nursing. The building has everything from administration offices to wet laboratories to lecture halls.

== History ==
Construction of the original Health Sciences Building began in 1947 on what had been the University Golf Links south of Pacific Street along Portage Bay. It had eight wings denoted A through H featuring sculptures by Dudley Pratt and was designed by architecture firm Naramore, Bain, Brady, Johanson, McCellan & Jones (later NBBJ). A commemorative plaque inside the original C-Wing lobby notes that it had "about 3,000,000 square feet of space." However, the original architectural design is largely obscured by later additions, particularly the brutalist T-Wing along Pacific St. The original building was dedicated on October 9, 1949.

The largest single addition to the building was the eight-story University Hospital, which opened on May 4, 1959, at a cost of $10 million. It replaced Harborview Medical Center as the teaching hospital for the University of Washington School of Medicine. The tallest wing in the complex is the 17-story Aagaard Tower (BB-Wing), which was expanded by eight stories in the 1970s.

The building was renamed in 1978 to honor U.S. Senator Warren G. Magnuson, who graduated from the University of Washington in 1929.
