= Network for Excellence in Health Innovation =

Defunct research and policy organization

NEHI (f/k/a New England Healthcare Institute)
- Founded: 2002; 24 years ago
- Dissolved: December 13, 2024; 21 months ago
- Tax ID no.: 01-0624865
- Legal status: 501(c)(3) nonprofit corporation (until dissolution)
- Location: Boston
- President and CEO: Wendy Warring
- Vice President: Thomas Hubbard
- Treasurer: Jonathan J. Fleming
- Chair of the Board of Directors: Mark Lutes
- Revenue: $1,352,527 (2024)
- Expenses: $1,375,211 (2024)
- Employees: 10 (2024)
- Website: Official website (archived)

Network for Excellence in Health Innovation (NEHI), formerly New England Healthcare Institute, was an American member-based, non-partisan research and policy organization based in Boston. It was founded in 2002 and voluntarily dissolved in 2024.

== History ==
NEHI was founded in 2002 as the New England Healthcare Institute with 21 founding members. In 2002, Wendy Everett became the organization’s president and Valerie Fleishman was hired as its executive director. NEHI published more than 20 publications regarding innovative ways to improve health care nationally. Its first report, Economic Contributions of the Health Care Industry to New England, was published in 2003. In 2004, NEHI created and published two reports on technologies intended to treat cancer and heart failure. In 2005, NEHI began collaborating with The Boston Foundation on the Greater Boston Health Care Economy project. In 2008, NEHI published reports addressing how to reduce wasteful spending and inefficiencies in health care. In January 2011, NEHI opened up offices in Washington, DC and San Francisco. In 2014, NEHI was renamed Network for Excellence in Health Innovation. NEHI's board of directors voted to dissolve the organization, effective December 13, 2024. At the time of its dissolution, it was headquartered in Boston.

== Founders ==
NEHI was founded by the following individuals:

- Henri Termeer, then-CEO, Genzyme
- Joseph B. Martin, MD, PhD, then Dean of Harvard Medical School
- Sam Thier, MD, then CEO, Partners HealthCare
- Fred Telling, PhD, then VP of Corporate Policy and Strategic Management, Pfizer
- Charlie Baker, CEO, Harvard Pilgrim Health Care

== Members ==
As of April 2021, NEHI’s members included:

- ABIOMED, Inc.
- AdvaMed
- Advanced ICU Care
- Alkermes, Inc.
- Alkeus Pharmaceuticals, Inc.
- American Associate of Colleges of Pharmacy
- American Cancer Society - New England
- American Diabetes Association
- American Osteopathic Association
- Anthurium Solutions, Inc.
- APCO Worldwide
- Arthritis Foundation, New England Region
- Association of American Medical Colleges
- AstraZeneca Pharmaceuticals LP
- Best Doctors
- Biotechnology Industry Organization
- Blue Cross Blue Shield Association
- Blue Cross Blue Shield of Massachusetts
- Boston Healthcare Associates
- Bristol-Myers Squibb
- California Healthcare Institute
- Caregiver Action Network
- Center for Applied Research
- COPD Foundation
- CVS Caremark
- DePuy Mitek, Inc.
- Dovetail Health
- Eliza Corporation
- EMC Corporation
- EMD Serono, Inc.
- Endo Pharmaceuticals
- Ernst & Young, LLP
- Fallon Community Health Plan
- Foley Hoag, LLP
- GlaxoSmithKline
- The Goodyear Tire & Rubber Company
- Greater Boston Chamber of Commerce
- Harvard Pilgrim Health Care
- The Healthcare Compliance Packaging Council
- Healthcare Institute of New Jersey
- Hospital Corporation of America
- Health Dialog Services Corporation
- Joslin Diabetes Center
- Kaiser Permanente
- King & Spalding, LLP
- Lockheed Martin Corporation
- Malley & Franey Financial Group, Inc.
- Massachusetts Biotechnology Council
- Massachusetts Council of Community Hospitals
- Massachusetts Life Sciences Center
- Massachusetts Medical Society
- Massachusetts Technology Collaborative
- McKinsey & Company
- Merck & Co., Inc.
- MWV Healthcare
- National Association of Chain Drug Stores Foundation
- National Community Pharmacists Association
- National Consumers League
- National Family Caregivers Association
- National Pharmaceutical Council
- Network Health
- New England Council
- Novartis Vaccines & Diagnostics
- Novo Nordisk, Inc.
- Onyx Pharmaceuticals
- Organogenesis Inc.
- Oxford Bioscience Partners
- PAREXEL International, Inc.
- Partners HealthCare System
- Philips Healthcare
- PhRMA
- PricewaterhouseCoopers LLP
- Project HOPE
- Sanofi
- Scott & White Healthcare
- Silverlink Communications, Inc.
- Steward Health Care System, LLC
- Tufts Center for the Study of Drug Development
- Tufts Health Plan
- Tufts University School of Medicine
- UCLA Health System
- UK Trade & Investment
- University of Massachusetts Medical School
- URAC
- Verisk Health
