= Laura Arnold =

American philanthropist

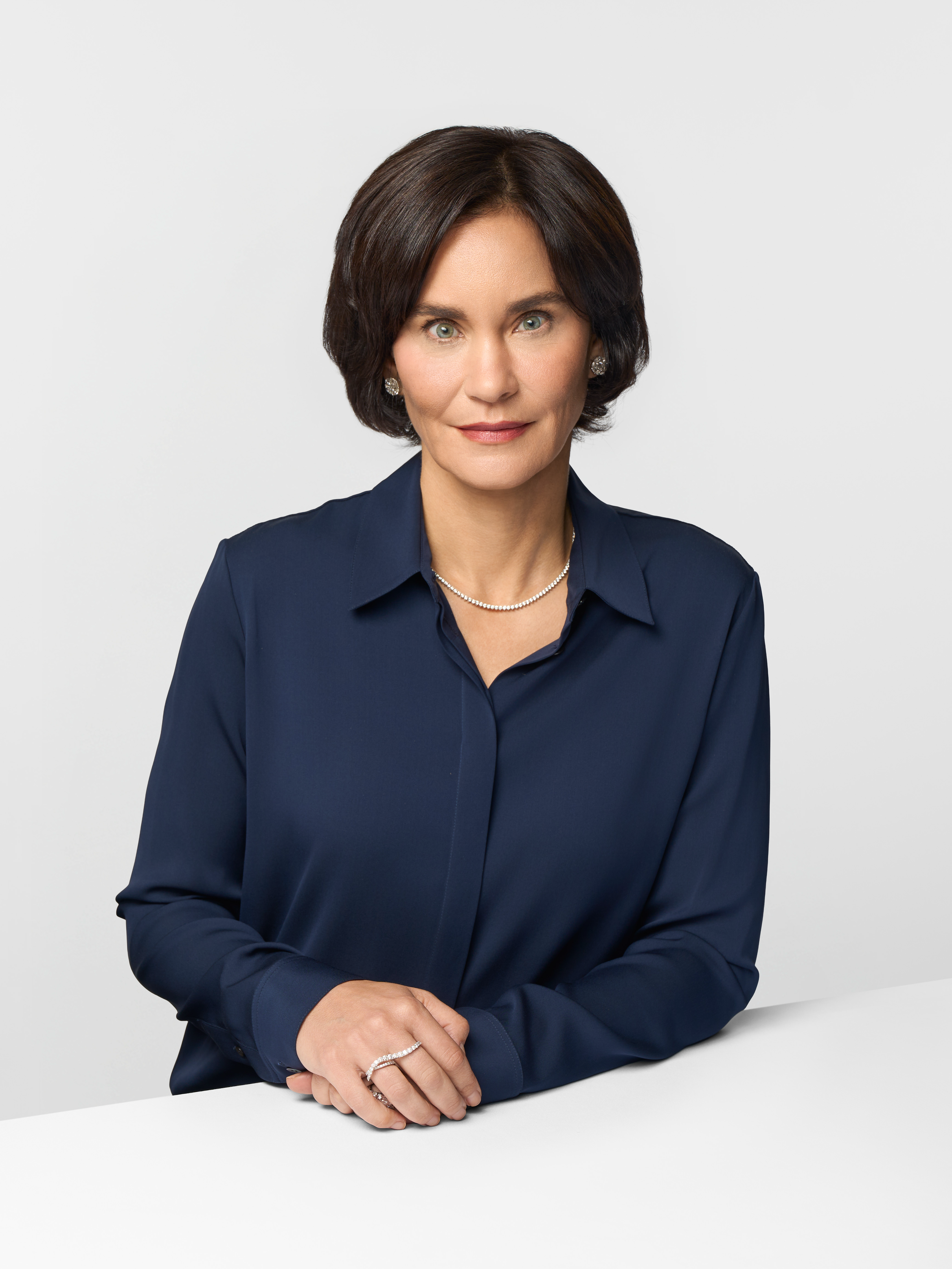
- Arnold in 2025
- Born: Laura Elena Muñoz; 1972 or 1973 (age 53–54); Puerto Rico, U.S.
- Education: Harvard University (BA); University of Cambridge (MPhil); Yale University (JD)
- Occupation: Philanthropist
- Title: Co-founder of Arnold Ventures LLC
- Spouse: John Arnold
- Children: 3

Laura Elena Arnold (née Muñoz; born 1972/1973) is an American philanthropist and co-founder of Arnold Ventures LLC. In addition to serving as co-chair of Arnold Ventures, Arnold became a founding partner of the REFORM Alliance, a national criminal justice advocacy organization in 2019. Prior to her work in philanthropy, she was a mergers-and-acquisitions lawyer and an executive at Cobalt International Energy.

== Career ==
Arnold was a mergers-and-acquisitions lawyer at Wachtell, Lipton, Rosen and Katz in New York. She then worked as executive vice president and general counsel of Cobalt International Energy in Houston until 2006. She has degrees from Harvard (B.A. in government), Cambridge (Masters of Philosophy in European Studies), and Yale Law School (J.D.) and clerked for Judith W. Rogers, judge of the United States Court of Appeals for the District of Columbia Circuit.

In 2010, Arnold was elected as a trustee to Rice University's board. Previously she was an adjunct professor of management at Rice's Jones Graduate School of Business. She also was on the board for Teach for America, chaired the Civil Service Commission of the City of Houston, and served as a trustee of the Baylor College of Medicine and the Museum of Fine Arts, Houston.

She ran the Laura and John Arnold Foundation until 2012 when her husband, John Arnold, joined her.

== Arnold Ventures and philanthropy ==
Laura and John Arnold were two of the original signatories of the Giving Pledge in 2010, pledging to give at least half of their wealth away. In 2008, they opened a private foundation that focuses on philanthropic efforts in the areas of education, health, tax policy, and criminal justice. In 2019, the foundation was restructured into an LLC and renamed Arnold Ventures. It combines the Laura and John Arnold Foundation, their political giving group the Action Now Initiative, and their donor-advised fund.

In 2013, during the federal government shutdown, the Arnolds donated $10 million to keep Head Start programs running and serving at-risk children.

From 2010-2013, Arnold served on the board of the Innocence Project, an organization that focuses on exonerating individuals who have been wrongfully convicted. In 2017, she gave a TEDx talk on the importance of using evidence-based data to solve problems and make policy decisions. In May 2018, the Arnolds committed $20 million to the National Collaborative on Gun Violence Research. In March 2019, the Arnolds announced the opening of the National Partnership for Pretrial Justice.

In 2016, Arnold and her husband faced controversy after donating $360,000 (in two separate donations, both totaling over $100,000) to the police department of Baltimore, Maryland to fund an aerial surveillance program run by Ohio-based company Persistent Surveillance Systems (technology based off of Kestrel systems used in Afghanistan. There was major media fallout after it was revealed in August that the police department commenced the program in January without disclosing their receipt of the donations, the start of the program, or the fact that they were surveilling Baltimore residents; the police kept this from both the public and the rest of Maryland's government.

A later 2020 above-the-board donation would lead to an extended court case; the Fourth Circuit Court of Appeals would rule the surveillance system a violation of the Fourth Amendment of the United States Constitution.

In July 2019, Arnold joined the board of the REFORM Alliance, a criminal justice advocacy group founded by Jay-Z and Meek Mill.

In April 2021, Arnold committed to donating 5% of her wealth annually when she and her husband signed Global Citizen's "Give While You Live" campaign. This is an effort to encourage more donations to charitable organizations. Arnold and her husband are also leading the Initiative to Accelerate Charitable Giving, which, among other goals, wants Congress to raise giving requirements for donor-advised funds.

== Personal life ==
Laura is married to John Arnold, and the couple have three children.
