= Henri Termeer =

American businessman (1946–2017)

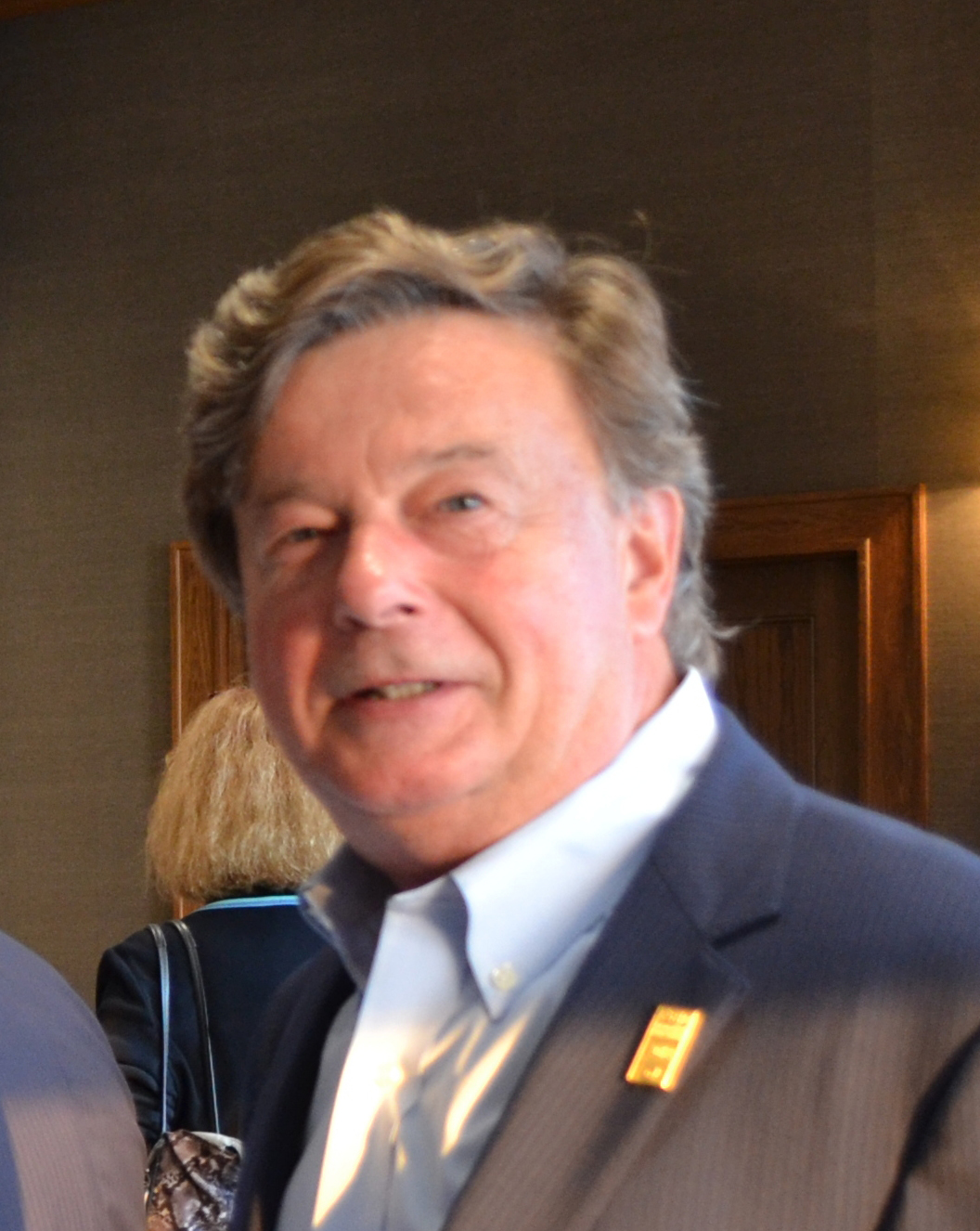
- Termeer 2012
- Born: February 28, 1946; Tilburg, Netherlands
- Died: May 12, 2017 (aged 71); Marblehead, Massachusetts, U.S.
- Education: Erasmus University
- Occupations: Executive; Biotechnology entrepreneur
- Board member of: Verastem; Genzyme (1983–2011); Federal Reserve Bank of Boston; ABIOMED Inc; Massachusetts Institute of Technology Corporation; Massachusetts General Hospital; Partners HealthCare System; Fellows of Harvard Medical School; Pharmaceutical Research and Manufacturers of AmericaBiotechnology Industry Organization; Moderna Therapeutics (2013-)
- Spouse: Belinda Termeer
- Children: 2

Henri A. Termeer (February 28, 1946 – May 12, 2017) was a Dutch biotechnology executive and entrepreneur. He was CEO at Genzyme from 1981 to 2011. Termeer created a business model, subsequently adopted by others in the industry, based on charging high prices for therapies for rare genetic disorders, known as orphan diseases. Genzyme used biological processes to manufacture drugs that were not easily copied by generic drug manufacturers. The drugs were protected by orphan drug acts, limiting competition and ensuring coverage by publicly funded insurers. As CEO of Genzyme, he developed corporate strategies for growth including optimizing institutional embeddedness, nurturing networks of influential groups and clusters: doctors, private equity, patient-groups, insurance, healthcare umbrella organizations, state and local government, and alumni. Termeer was "connected to 311 board members in 17 different organizations across 20 different industries".

Termeer was named as one of the top 50 people who have advanced rare disease research, in a list produced by Terrapin for the World Orphan Drug Congress. The congress described him as an "inspiration and pioneer", many of whose protégés have gone on to lead other successful companies in the rare disease and biotech sector.

== Education ==
Termeer studied economics at Erasmus University in the Netherlands. In 1973, he completed his MBA at Darden School of Business at the University of Virginia. He received an honorary Doctor of Science from the University of Massachusetts.

== Career ==
=== Baxter ===
Termeer began his career in the medical and healthcare industry in 1973 when he started working as manager of international product planning for Deerfield, Illinois-based Travenol Laboratories Inc. now known as Baxter. From 1975 to 1976 he was Baxter's international marketing manager. From 1976 to 1979 he was general manager for Travenol GMBH in Munich.

From 1979 to 1981 he was executive vice president of the Hyland Therapeutics division of Baxter Travenol in Glendale, California. Hyland sold Factor VIII, Factor IX, immunoglobulins, and albumin. The plasma was collected through plasmapheresis performed at collection centers all around the country, but there were ethical concerns raised over payments for plasma being made to vulnerable people. Standards for donating plasma are set by the U.S. Food and Drug Administration (FDA). Almost all plasmapheresis in the US is performed by automated methods such as the Plasma Collection System (PCS2) made by Haemonetics or the Auto pheresis-C (Auto-C) made by Fenwal, Inc., a former division of Baxter International. Termeer described this as the beginning of biotechnology. At that time Baxter was developing tests for Chagas disease which was very prevalent in Latin America. Termeer was sent to South America to investigate. After meeting with the military and with the Center for Disease Control he called off the project as unprofitable.

Back in Chicago, he was Baxter's International Marketing Manager for several years with the Artificial Organs Division.

Monica Higgins profiled Termeer as one of the alumni of the Baxter biopharmaceutical industry firm, the 'Baxter boys'—who produced many of leaders of the biopharmaceutical industry. Higgins noted in 2004 that at that time, [t]he size and extent of Baxter's influence overall [was] difficult to ascertain since the biotechnology industry, with eight- to ten-year product development cycles, [was] still in its relative infancy."

In December 2011, the non-partisan organization Public Campaign criticized Baxter for spending $10.45 million on lobbying and not paying any taxes during 2008–2010, instead getting $66 million in tax rebates, despite making a profit of $926 million.

=== Genzyme ===
In 1983, Termeer joined Genzyme, a two-year-old start-up biotechnology company located in Cambridge, Massachusetts. At that time, he described the company as "just three professors from MIT and myself and some venture capitalists." According to the Boston Globe staff writer Robert Weisman, "in the formative years of biotechnology, Genzyme was the industry's Apple, blazing a pathway for creating protein-based treatments for rare diseases".

In 1985 he was appointed as Genzyme's CEO, and by 1988 he was chairman. During those years he held positions at Genzyme in Genzyme Tissue Repair, Strategic Planning & Capital Allocation Committee and Member of Risk Oversight Committee, Genzyme Oncology.

When Genzyme needed a manufacturing facility, Termeer chose to remain in Massachusetts and use local contractors instead of joining the pharmaceuticals cluster in the New Jersey and Philadelphia areas. Harvard Business School professor Michael E. Porter described Termeer's strategy as a cluster, the new economics of competition with all members benefiting from "a strong base of supporting functions and institutions." Under Termeer's leadership, Genzyme built a "critical mass" for its cluster in Massachusetts, a group of institutions that achieved unusual competitive success in the life sciences industry or biotechnology.

In 2005 Genzyme chose the specialty pharmacy division of PharmaCare, one of the largest pharmaceutical benefit management companies, as the national network provider for Thyrogen, Genzyme's specialty drug.

=== Cerezyme and Gaucher's disease ===
In 1991 the first version of Genzyme's orphan drug Alglucerase (brand name Ceredase), the only treatment for Gaucher's disease, was approved by the FDA.

Termeer explained in a 2005 interview for The Wall Street Journal that, in 1991, one treatment of Cerezyme for one patient took 22,000 placentas annually to manufacture, a difficult and expensive procedure. According to the Congressional Office of Technology Assessment, cerezyme cost $1.90 per unit including the cost of manufacturing, marketing, and distribution. Genzyme charged $3.50 a unit. Imiglucerase was granted orphan drug status in the US, Australia, and Japan.

By 1994 Genzyme had a new version of Cerezyme produced in genetically engineered cells in a process that was easier and cheaper. Although imiglucerase costs only less than 37 cents to manufacture, Genzyme charges $3.70 per unit making a 90% profit. The high price of the medication is part of Genzyme's business strategy for the biotech firm to undertake research and development for other drugs and to allow them to fund programs that distribute a small portion of production for free, so instead of lowering the price, Termeer "decided to use the extra revenue to give additional Cerezyme away free in countries that can't afford to pay the high price. He said Genzyme gives away about 10% of the drug it produces." By 2005 Genzyme had hired 34 people to help patients acquire insurance plans that would cover the cost of their drugs. By 2005 there were still no alternative drugs for patients and most insurers were willing to pay. Genzyme used the profits "to bring new treatments to market for two other rare diseases. It has purchased many small companies to expand into a diversified drug company with cancer, kidney disease and diagnostic products, among others."

By 2005 although Cerezyme cost the average patient (including babies) $200,000 a year, it could cost a single adult patient as much as $520,000 a year even though it cost Genzyme less than $52,000 to manufacture. In 2005 there were only about 4,500 patients on Cerezyme.

=== Pompe disease ===
In 1998, two of Biotech executive John Crowley's children, Megan and Patrick, were diagnosed with a severe neuromuscular disorder, glycogen storage disease type II, also called Pompe's disease. In the face of the children's deteriorating health, the family moved to Princeton, New Jersey, to be close to doctors specializing in the disease. Crowley worked at Bristol-Myers Squibb, but frustrated with the slow pace of research on Pompe's disease, he left the company in March 2000 and took a position as CEO of Novazyme Pharmaceuticals, a biotechnology research company located in Oklahoma City which was researching a new experimental treatment for the disease.

Crowley was a major force behind the search for a cure. By 2001 when Genzyme acquired Novazyme, Termeer put Crowley in charge of Genzyme's global Pompe program, the largest R&D effort in the company's history, from September 2001 until December 2002. At that time Genzyme was considered to be the world's third largest biotechnology company, Genzyme's work eventually bore fruit and in January 2003 Crowley's children received the enzyme replacement therapy for Pompe disease developed by Genzyme. Crowley credits the experimental trial with saving his children's lives. The acquisition of Novazyme by Genzyme, and Crowley's fight to cure Pompe's Disease, was documented in the Harvard Business School Case Study, Novazyme: A Father's Love.

According to Higgins, by 2004 Henri Termeer's leadership at Genzyme was considered exemplary by several biotech industry observers, and Genzyme was seen as a role model for other biotechnology firms.

According to The Wall Street Journal, in 2004 Termeer earned a combined salary and bonus of $3 million. He also had "options valued at between $12.6 million and $32 million in 10 years, based on appreciation of the company's stock of between 5% and 10% a year, according to the company's proxy."

In 2007 Genzyme acquired Bioenvision and the rights to the North American market for clofarabine (brand name Clofarex), designated by the Food and Drug Administration (FDA) as an orphan drug

In 2007 Termeer as CEO earned a salary of $2.5 million, and non-cash compensation worth $129 million.

From 2007 to 2008 under Termeer as CEO, Genzyme spent $2.8 million on lobbying. In 2009 alone, Genzyme had 10 different organizations with a total of 49 lobbyists working on its behalf.

In 1981, before Termeer had joined Genzyme, it was a small firm that employed 14 people in an office in Chinatown. By 2006 Genzyme with Termeer as CEO had more than 8,000 staff in 70 offices and plants worldwide, making it the third-largest company of its kind. In 2004 Termeer was the area's highest-paid CEO, with a total compensation package worth at least $37.9 million. He was 42nd in the 2006 list of Boston's wealthiest with a net worth of $342 million.

In June 2009, Genzyme experienced a manufacturing disaster after contamination with Vesivirus 2117 at their Allston, Massachusetts plant that resulted in shortages of Genzyme drugs including Cerezyme. Genzyme's corporate behavior was described as irresponsible and arrogant. The company was fined $175 million by the FDA for manufacturing deficiencies. Genzyme's stocks fell and their competitors benefited. As a result, in 2011 Genzyme was acquired by Sanofi for more than $20 billion in a hostile takeover in October 2011, engineered in part by Sanofi CEO Christopher Viehbacher. Afterwards, Termeer retired. When Termeer left Genzyme his payout was valued at about $138 million.

In 1993, Termeer helped establish the Biotechnology Industry Organization (BIO), and joined the board of directors. The BIO was formed through the merger of the Association of Biotechnology Companies (ABC), an association of smaller start-ups and their business support network, and the Industrial Biotechnology Association (IBA), an organization for the larger biotech firms. Following the election of President Bill Clinton in 1992, Termeer was concerned about potential health-care and FDA reform and wanted the biotechnology industry to speak with one voice. By engaging and including patient groups, religious groups, etc. the BIO successfully lobbied in favour of the Food and Drug Administration Modernization Act of 1997 which provided criteria for "fast-track drug development, allowed some drug approvals based on one pivotal trial, provided easier patient access to experimental drugs and devices, and renewed the Prescription Drug User Fee program".

In 2002 Termeer was involved in the establishment of the New England Healthcare Institute (NEHI), a "nonprofit, applied research health policy organization" composed of senior healthcare experts and executives. NEHI members include biotech and pharmaceutical companies, academic health centers, hospitals, medical device companies, employers, payers, patient groups, and others. Termeer was a Chairman Emeritus of the New England Healthcare Institute.

In 2008 Governor Deval Patrick appointed Termeer to the Massachusetts Council of Economic Advisors.

=== Later career ===
By 2012 Termeer was chairman of cancer drug specialists Aveo Oncology ($AVEO). In 2012 he began working as a strategic advisor for Prosensa, a venture-backed biotech also focused on rare inherited diseases like his former company Genzyme comprised a mission of, whose lead program, an RNA therapy, called 051, for an orphan disease known as Duchenne muscular dystrophy (DMD), is being developed by pharmaceutical company GlaxoSmithKline (GSK).

In 2013, Termeer met Daniel de Boer, CEO of Dutch biotech startup ProQR Therapeutics of Leiden, which had licensed a compound from Boston scientists to develop a treatment for cystic fibrosis (CF) focusing on the role of messenger RNA (mRNA). Termeer joined a group of executives providing financial backing for ProQR, which has subsequently pivoted to inherited retinal diseases including Leber congenital amaurosis, Usher syndrome and retinitis pigmentosa. ProQR laid out its proposed terms for a $75 million IPO.

During April 2013, Termeer joined the board of directors of Moderna Therapeutics, a Cambridge-based biotech company that was developing a platform technology for delivery of mRNA.

In 2013, Termeer provided financial backing for Lysosomal Therapeutics, a biotech firm in Boston developing a treatment for Parkinson's disease and other neurodegenerative diseases. According to Bloomberg, Termeer was the founder of the company, and he also provided mentoring to CEO Dimitri Krainc, a Slovenian neurologist at Massachusetts General Hospital, who said that he and Termeer were "in contact by e-mail, phone, or in person weekly".

In September 2013, China's CANbridge, which commercializes Western clinical stage pharmaceutical products in China, appointed Termeer as Chief Advisor of their Life Sciences Advisory Board.

== Mentorship ==
After retirement, Termeer continued to mentor former Genzyme colleagues who are now CEOs of about two dozen smaller companies, including Geoff McDonough, CEO of Generation Bio; Gail Maderis, who runs biotechnology firms and an industry trade group in the San Francisco Bay area; Tom Mathers, CEO at CoLucid Pharmaceuticals Inc.; Jeff Albers, who heads a Cambridge-based startup, Blueprint Medicines Corporation; and Greg Madison, CEO of New York's Keryx Biopharmaceuticals Inc.

== Awards ==
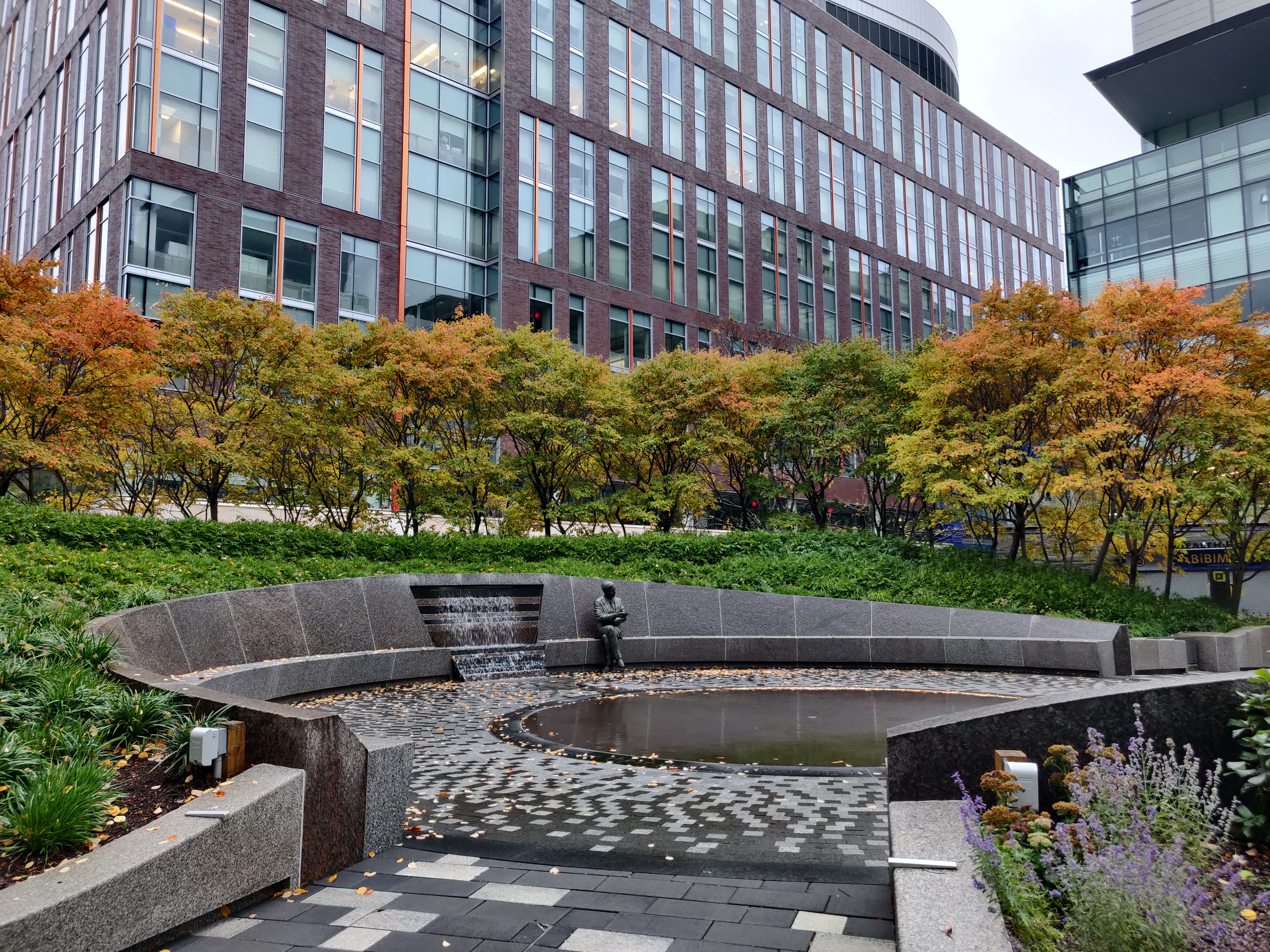
Memorial in Henri A. Termeer Square in East Cambridge

- 1990–1992 The Wall Street Transcript Gold Award
- 1995 Success Magazine 'Renegade of the Year'
- 1999 Golden Door award from the International Institute of New England, an award that symbolizes the positive influence that immigrants have had on America.
- 2003 Cor Vitae Award from the American Heart Association
- In 2005 Genzyme received the National Medal of Technology and Innovation, the highest honor awarded by the President of the United States for technological innovation. Termeer accepted the award on behalf of Genzyme "For pioneering dramatic improvements in the health of thousands of patients with rare diseases and harnessing the promise of biotechnology to develop innovative new therapies."
- 2007 Ernst & Young Entrepreneur of the Year Award
- 2008 Biotechnology Heritage Award, from the Biotechnology Industry Organization (BIO) and the Chemical Heritage Foundation

=== Global Genes RARE Project Champions of Hope ===
In 2012 Termeer received the Lifetime Achievement Award from Nicole Boice, founder and CEO, Global Genes R.A.R.E Project. He was honoured for helping "to establish Massachusetts as a major center of industrial biotech research and development," for "spearheading the development of rare disease treatments at a time when other pharmaceutical companies were focusing on drugs for much larger patient populations."

== Academic ==
- 1999 Fellow of the American Academy of Arts and Sciences
- 1999 Genetic Disease Foundation Humanitarian Award
- 2005 Honorary Fellowship at the British Royal College of Physicians

== Philanthropy ==
Termeer made a $10 million donation to fund research at the Henri and Belinda Termeer Center for Targeted Therapies at the Massachusetts General Hospital Cancer Center, which conducts clinical trials for patients with early and advanced stage cancers. Termeer was on the board of directors of the MGH.

In 2011, Termeer, with fellow Partners HealthCare board members Cathy Minehan and Charles K. Gifford, co-chaired the Massachusetts General Hospital bicentennial, a fundraising gala with 1,000 attendees, which raised approximately $1 million.
