= University of Washington Medical Center =

Teaching hospital in Seattle, Washington, U.S.

Coordinates: 47°39′00″N 122°18′29″W

- University of Washington Medicine
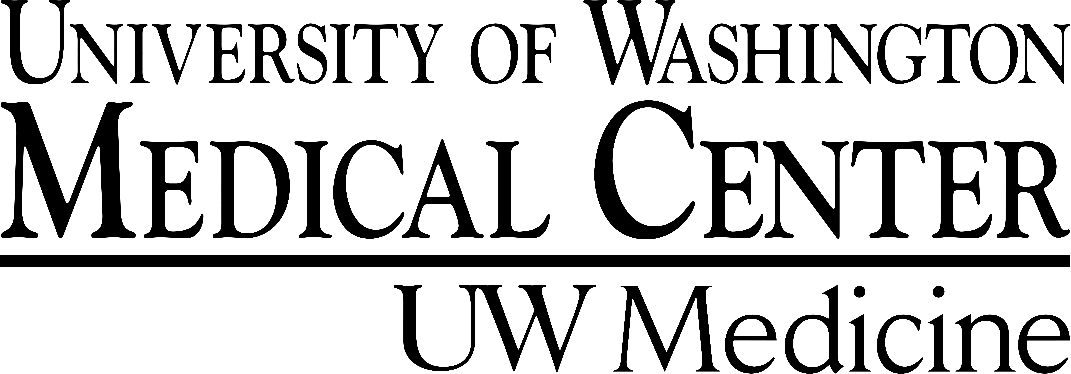

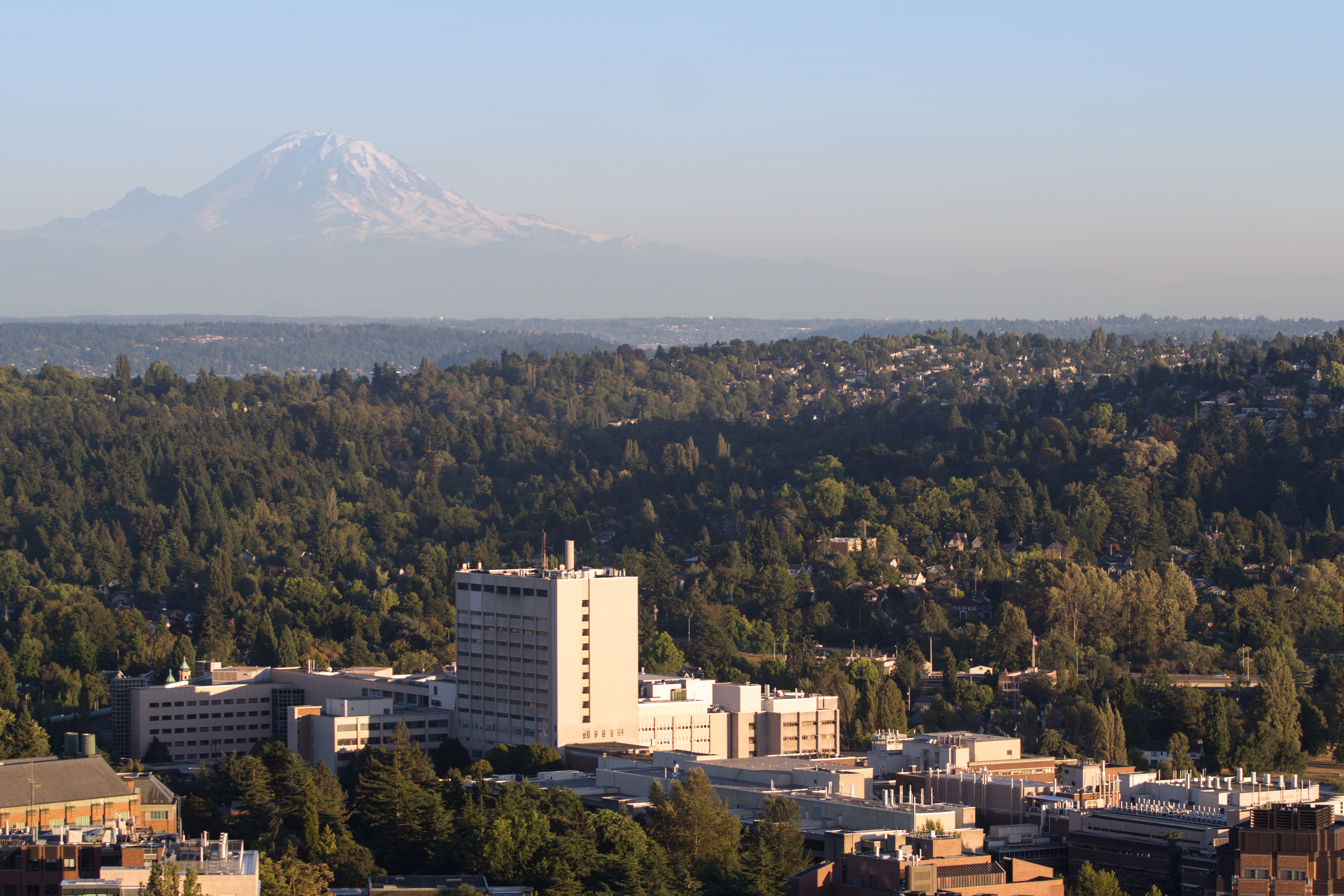
- The medical center in 2013

Geography
- Location: 1959 NE Pacific Street, Seattle, Washington, U.S.

Organisation
- Type: Teaching
- Affiliated university: University of Washington

Services
- Beds: 570

History
- Founded: May 4, 1959

Links
- Website: uwmedicine.org/uwmc
- Lists: Hospitals in U.S.
- Other links: Harborview Medical Center

The University of Washington Medical Center (UWMC) is a hospital in the University District of Seattle, Washington. It is one of the teaching hospitals affiliated with the University of Washington School of Medicine and is located in the Warren G. Magnuson Health Sciences Center.

The UWMC opened on May 5, 1959, and became home to the world's first pain center and also the world's first long-term kidney dialysis which was developed by UW professor Belding H. Scribner, M.D.

The 2007 issue of U.S. News & World Report's "America's Best Hospitals" ranked the UWMC 10th out of 5,000 hospitals nationwide. According to the report, several UWMC programs scored highly in specialty rankings, including primary care, rehabilitation medicine, and neurology/neurosurgery.

In 2012, UWMC added the eight-story, $210 million Montlake Tower which expanded its capacity to more than 570 patient beds. In May 2013, it was announced that UW Medicine, which owns and operates the UWMC, and PeaceHealth would join forces with one another in a "strategic affiliation." The American Civil Liberties Union criticized the merger, due to PeaceHealth being "directed by the Catholic Ethical and Religious Directives."
