= Simon Lazarus =

American businessman

- Born: 1807; Württemberg, Germany
- Died: 1877 (aged 69–70); Columbus, Ohio, U.S.
- Citizenship: Germany; United States
- Occupations: rabbinical scholar, retailer
- Spouse: Amelia Lazarus
- Children: Fred Lazarus, Sr. Ralph Lazarus
- Relatives: Fred Lazarus, Jr. (grandson); Simon Lazarus, Sr. (grandson); Robert Lazarus, Sr. (grandson); Jeffrey Lazarus, Sr. (grandson); Maurice Lazarus (great grandson); Fred "Fritz" Lazarus 5th (great great great grandson); Catie Lazarus (great-great-great-granddaughter)

Simon Lazarus (1807–1877) was an American clothing retailer and the founder of the predecessor of what was to become The F&R Lazarus & Co., an operation which blossomed into what is today known as Macy's, Inc, a major retail holding company in the U.S.

== Early life ==
In 1850, Lazarus, a rabbinical scholar, arrived in Columbus, and in 1851 he opened the Lazarus store. Assisted by his wife Amelia and sons Fred and Ralph, Simon and his store gradually began to prosper. Simon Lazarus was described by his grandson, Robert Sr., as "a good man, a gentle man, a scholar--and no merchant." By 1870, industry improvements (primarily attributable to the mass manufacture of men's uniforms for the Civil War), led the family to expand the business to include ready-made men's civilian clothing and eventually a complete line of merchandise. Simon Lazarus served as the first Rabbi of Central Ohio's oldest Reform synagogue, Temple Israel.

Later Simon sons, Fred Lazarus, Sr. and Ralph Lazarus, joined the business, adding many innovative marketing techniques. After Simon's death in 1877, his widow Amelia continued running the store with their two sons. After Amelia's death in 1899, the store was renamed The F&R Lazarus & Company and positioned for rapid expansion of the company.

Lazarus was interred at Green Lawn Cemetery in Columbus, Ohio.
