= Employee of the Month (talk show) =

Talk show hosted by Catie Lazarus

- Genre: Entertainment, finance, advice, talk show
- Language: English

Cast and voices
- Hosted by: Catie Lazarus

Publication
- No. of episodes: 287
- Original release: 2010

Employee of the Month is a talk show hosted by Catie Lazarus that features guests with jobs of interest, ranging from television personalities and musicians to comedians and puppeteers. It began as a live show in 2010 and became a podcast in 2012. Lazarus has hosted live tapings at Upright Citizens Brigade Theater in New York City, 92 Y in Los Angeles and The Bell House in Brooklyn. It has been syndicated for airing on Sirius XM Radio. The show is currently performed and taped live at Joe's Pub in New York City monthly.

Lazarus hatched the idea for the podcast when she was frustrated with her own attempt at finding a job, which led her to approach successful people to talk about their work and how they had landed their dream jobs.

== Reception ==
The show has been called "beloved" by The New York Times, and "hilarious" and "ambitious" by BlackBook. The New Yorker praised the show for its "extremely notable" guests and Lazarus' "decidedly unorthodox" interview style. New York featured the show in its "Seriously Funny" section, calling Lazarus "adorable" as she "picks the brains of folks with much cooler jobs than yours".

Gothamist wrote that "Catie Lazarus Is One Of The Finest Live Talk Show Hosts In NYC,"urging its readers to catch Lazarus and her "consistently... incredible guests" at her live show at Joe's Pub in the Village.

== Notable interview subjects ==
Jon Stewart chose Employee of the Month to give his first interview after announcing his decision to retire from the Daily Show in February of 2015. Stewart follows many of his Daily Show collaborators, including Aasif Mandvi, Dave Attell, Wyatt Cenac, Buck Henry, Mo Rocca, David Wain, and Lewis Black as guests on the show; in turn, Lazarus herself appeared in the Daily Show in a sketch about a prequel to Hot Tub Time Machine. Stewart discussed some of his future plans, assuring fans that he was not retiring. Though he plans to spend more time with his family, he suggested that he would continue writing – to which Lazarus later responded by giving him a notebook as a parting gift - and even that he could return to stand-up comedy.

In 2014, Jill Abramson gave her last interview as executive editor of The New York Times before being fired from that position.

American statistician and writer Nate Silver appeared on the show in 2015, during which he criticized Vox Media for "rewriting Wikipedia articles" for their content.

Patti LuPone appeared on a 2016 episode, where she performed the song "Meadowlark" with Tituss Burgess.

Soul singer Lee Fields discussed his experiences during segregation on the show.

Novelist Zadie Smith spoke of her former career as a cabaret singer in retirement homes on the show. She performed a rendition of "The Lady Is a Tramp" with singer Lady Rizo.

Actor, rapper, and songwriter Daveed Diggs appeared on the show, speaking about his former day job at a Pier 1 Imports store.

In a special live episode, psychologist and Buddhist teacher Tara Brach led the audience in guided meditation.

Writer and activist Gloria Steinem appeared on the show, discussing everything from feminism to fundraising to her affinity for tap dancing.

Political commentator and news host Rachel Maddow mixed cocktails during her appearance on the show.

Journalist Jodi Kantor appeared on the show in 2012, five years before she broke the news of Harvey Weinstein's sexual abuse that sparked the Me Too movement.

In his 2016 appearance, founder of Gawker Media Nick Denton discussed his bankruptcy, along with Peter Thiel's attempts to bring down Gawker by funding lawsuits against Denton, including the 2016 lawsuit involving Hulk Hogan.

Actress Edie Falco sang live for the first time in her life during her 2017 appearance on the show. Falco performed "I Never Talk to Strangers," originally by Tom Waits and Bette Middler, with fellow Nurse Jackie actor Stephen Wallem.

Also featured on the show are: the longest contributor to MAD Magazine Al Jaffee, actor Jon Hamm, Hamilton actor Christopher Jackson, former United States Ambassador to the United Nations Samantha Power, actress and comedian Maya Rudolph, actor Patton Oswalt, psychotherapist and author Esther Perel, former dot com business executive Seth Godin, actor John Turturro, blogger Maria Popova of BrainPickings.org, actor and comedian Keegan Michael-Key, actress Olympia Dukakis, creator of Gilmore Girls and The Marvelous Mrs. Maisel Amy Sherman-Palladino, author and television writer David Simon (creator of The Wire), actress and activist Cynthia Nixon, actor Utkarsh Ambudkar, and screenwriter/director Greta Gerwig.
