= Maurice Lazarus =

American retailing executive (1915–2004)

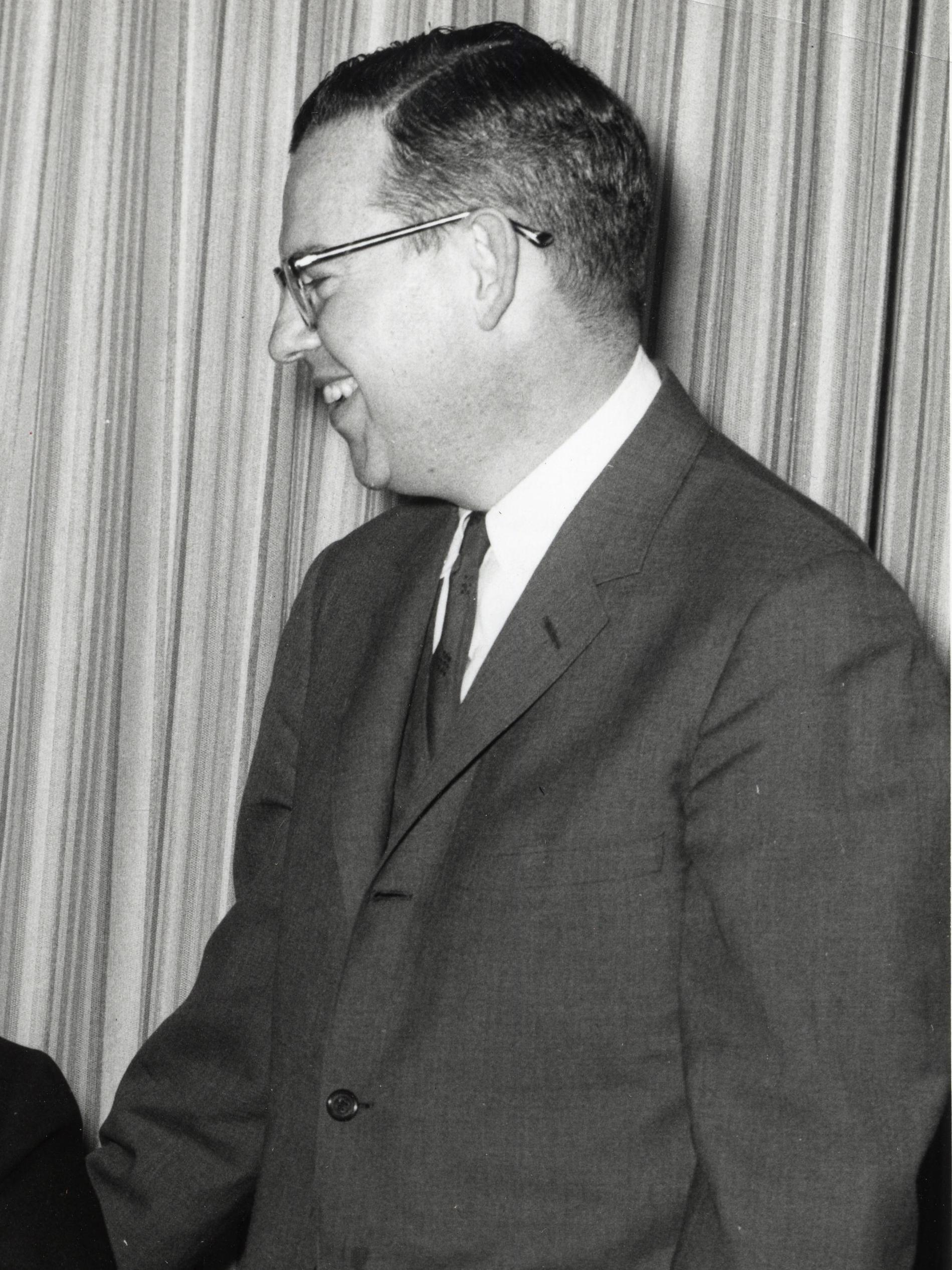
- Lazarus in the 1960s
- Born: Maurice Lazarus; June 27, 1915; Columbus, Ohio, US
- Died: May 4, 2004 (age 88); Cambridge, Massachusetts, US
- Education: B.A. Harvard University
- Occupation: Retail executive
- Known for: President of Filene's; Founder of Harvard Pilgrim Health Care
- Parent(s): Meta Marx Lazarus; Fred Lazarus Jr.
- Family: Simon Lazarus (great-grandfather)

Maurice "Mogie" Lazarus (June 27, 1915 – May 4, 2004) was an American retailing executive who served as president of Filene's and founded Harvard Pilgrim Health Care.

== Biography ==
Lazarus was born to a Jewish family on June 27, 1915 in Columbus, Ohio, the son of Meta (née Marx) and Fred Lazarus Jr. and great-grandson of Simon Lazarus, the founder of F&R Lazarus & Company. His father co-founded Federated Department Stores in 1929 which entailed merging F&R Lazarus & Company (including its Cincinnati division, then known as Shillito's), Abraham & Straus, and William Filene's Sons of Boston, under a single holding company (Bloomingdale Brothers of New York joined in 1930). As a youth, he worked at the local Lazarus store. In 1937, he graduated from Harvard University. From 1945 until 1958, he worked at Foley’s Department Store (acquired by Federated in 1947) in Houston reaching to executive vice president. In 1958, he was named president of Filene's where he served until 1964, chairman until 1965, and chairman of its finance committee until 1982. In 1989, he was founder of the Harvard Community Health Plan (now Harvard Pilgrim Health Care).

Lazarus served on the Harvard University board of overseers and was the director of the alumni association. He served on the U.S. Department of Health, Education and Welfare's Advisory Committee on National Health Insurance and on the advisory board of the Commission on the Status of Women during administration of President Lyndon Baines Johnson.

== Personal life ==
Lazarus was married twice. In 1942, he married Nancy Stix; she died in 1985. His second wife was Nell Eurich (previously married to educator Alvin C. Eurich). He has two daughters: Carol Lazarus and Jill Lazarus with his first wife; and two stepchildren from his second wife, Donald Eurich and Juliet Eurich McDonough. Lazarus died of lung cancer at his home in Cambridge, Massachusetts.
