= Catie Lazarus =

American comedian and writer (1976–2020)

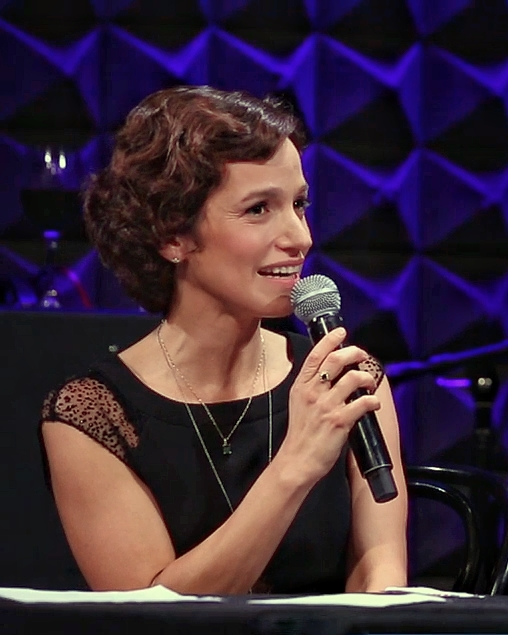
- Lazarus in 2015
- Born: Catherine Simone Avnet Lazarus; April 26, 1976; Washington, D.C., U.S.
- Died: December 13, 2020 (aged 44); New York City, U.S.
- Education: Wesleyan University
- Occupations: Writer, talk show host
- Relatives: Simon Lazarus (great-great-great-grandfather); Charles Avnet (great-grandfather); Jon Avnet (uncle); Hadley Freeman (cousin)

Catherine Simone Avnet Lazarus (April 26, 1976 – December 13, 2020) was an American writer, comedian, and talk show host. Lazarus was awarded "Best Comedy Writer" at the ECNY Awards and named one of New York's "Top 100 New Yorkers". Theater Mania called her a "comedy darling" and Lewis Black described her as "more brilliant than she'll ever know". Lazarus is best known as creator and host of the Employee of the Month, a monthly comedy show and podcast filmed live at Joe's Pub in New York City where she interviewed famous people about their jobs. The show was called "beloved" by The New York Times, and "hilarious" and "ambitious" by BlackBook.

== Early life and education ==
Born in Washington D.C., Lazarus attended Wesleyan University.

== Career ==
Lazarus dropped out of her doctoral studies to write comedy after an impromptu improv lesson from Tina Fey at an Empower Program conference in Washington, D.C. Three months later, Lazarus performed for the first time at Stand Up New York, where she won a contest. She then won another stand up contest at the Laugh Factory. She performed storytelling at The Moth, The Rejection Show at The Bell House, on Risk!, at Story Collider, and the Upright Citizens Brigade Theater's Asscat.

Her first article was a spoof of The New York Times wedding section. Vitamin W described her animated pilot MYC as offering "more than a few good laughs". Her most autobiographical work, according to Tubefilter, is a puppet show. "We get a peek into the devilishly candid and inventive mind of the young performer with her first original series, The on Time Show with Petunia Van De Twirp."

She was also a talk show host. Lazarus has interviewed, hosted shows and moderated panels for Women in Film, Brooklyn Jewish Film Festival, 92nd Y, Writers Guild of America (WGA-East), and the Tribeca Film Festival. In 2004, she created and hosted "Stand for Peace", a now annual comedy benefit for Seeds of Peace. She then produced and hosted the ECNY nominated comedy variety show "The Chosen One" at Upright Citizens Brigade Theater for Heeb Magazine, when she edited the magazine's Kvetch section. In 2006, Comix opened in New York and the booker plucked Lazarus to host the first alternative comedy showcase to feature younger talent and alternative comedy. Fresh Meat ran at Comix weekly for three years and then at Ars Nova. In 2007 she began hosting on the Couch for Tango Mag.

In 2010, Lazarus started the talk show Employee of the Month, praised by The New Yorker for its "extremely notable" guests and Lazarus' "decidedly unorthodox" interview style. It became a podcast in 2012. Lazarus hosted live tapings at Upright Citizens Brigade in New York and Los Angeles, 92 Y, The Bell House, and Joe's Pub. Lazarus interviewed numerous comedians, musicians, journalists, filmmakers, entrepreneurs, and social activists, including Gloria Steinem, Rosie Perez, Wallace Shawn, Martha Plimpton, Dick Cavett and Lewis Black.

After Jon Stewart announced his departure from The Daily Show, the first public comments he made about it were on Lazarus' Employee of the Month show on February 19, 2015. He follows many of his Daily Show collaborators, including Aasif Mandvi, Dave Attell, Wyatt Cenac, Buck Henry, Mo Rocca, David Wain, and Lewis Black, as guests on the show; Lazarus herself appeared in the Daily Show in a sketch about a prequel to Hot Tub Time Machine.

== Personal life ==
Lazarus wrote about her late godfather Lenny Ross' interview with Mike Wallace for The Daily Beast. She was a descendant of the Lazarus family, who built the first major department store chain and persuaded President Franklin D. Roosevelt to change the date of Thanksgiving. Her paternal great-great-great-grandfather Simon Lazarus was President of F. & R. Lazarus, which featured the first escalator, employee commissions, and price tags. Her maternal grandfather Lester Avnet was the CEO of Avnet Inc., and her uncle Jon Avnet is a movie producer. Her father, Simon Lazarus III, served as a policy adviser to President Jimmy Carter; her brother Ned Lazarus co-founded the Co-Existence Center for Seeds of Peace.

Lazarus died from breast cancer at her apartment in Brooklyn on December 13, 2020, at age 44.

== Works ==
- Lazarus, Catie "Buy Curious: Dave Attell Gets a Bang for His Twenty Bucks". Heeb.
- Lazarus, Catie (May 2005) "Eco-Dating, Anyone?". Plenty.
- Lazarus, Catie (March 2005) "A Fair and Balanced Look at Al Franken". World Jewish Digest.
- Lazarus, Catie (August 4–10, 2005) "Taking it to the streets". Time Out New York.
- Lazarus, Catie (May 2005) "Eco-Dating, Anyone?". Plenty.
- Lazarus, Catie (January - February 2006) "Funny Girls: A Comedy Series Puts Moms at Center Stage". Time Out New York Kids.
- Lazarus, Catie (February 20, 2006) "Survival of the Fittest". The Jerusalem Report.
- Lazarus, Catie (December 6, 2006) "The Joke's on Them (For a Price)". New York Post.
- Lazarus, Catie (March 4–10, 2010) "The Brian Lehrer Show taping". Time Out New York.
- Lazarus, Catie (September 2010) "The Naughtiest Thing I've Ever Done". Cosmopolitan.
- Lazarus, Catie (April 4, 2014) "Remembering the Anita Hill Sexual Harassment Case". Out Magazine.
- Lazarus, Catie (April 14, 2012). "Was Mike Wallace's Toughest Interview a 12-Year-Old Kid?". The Daily Beast.
- Lazarus, Catie (April 14, 2014) "Jill Abramson on Tattoos, Anita Hill & Nate Silver". Out Magazine.
- Lazarus, Catie (May 11, 2014). "A Nanny's Love". The New York Times Magazine.
- Lazarus, Catie (May 16, 2014) "Catching Up With Barney Frank". Out Magazine.
- Lazarus, Catie (June 15, 2017) "Comedian Eddie Izzard Reflects on Love & Death in 'Believe Me'". Out Magazine.
- Lazarus, Catie (June 20, 2018). "Exit Interview: A series of conversations about being fired, retired, aged out, and laid off". The Atlantic. Retrieved January 29, 2020.
  - Lazarus, Catie (June 20, 2018). "The 'Disenfranchised Grief' of Losing Your Job". The Atlantic. Retrieved January 29, 2020.
  - Lazarus, Catie (June 20, 2018). "The Subtle and Not-So-Subtle Force of Ageism". The Atlantic. Retrieved January 29, 2020.
  - Lazarus, Catie (June 20, 2018). "The Never-Ending Struggle to Sustain a Small Business". The Atlantic. Retrieved January 29, 2020.
  - Lazarus, Catie (June 20, 2018). "When a Job Is Just Too Much". The Atlantic. Retrieved January 29, 2020.
  - Lazarus, Catie (June 20, 2018). "What Happens When a Nun Leaves the Church?". The Atlantic. Retrieved January 29, 2020.
