= ABA Centers of America =

American healthcare company

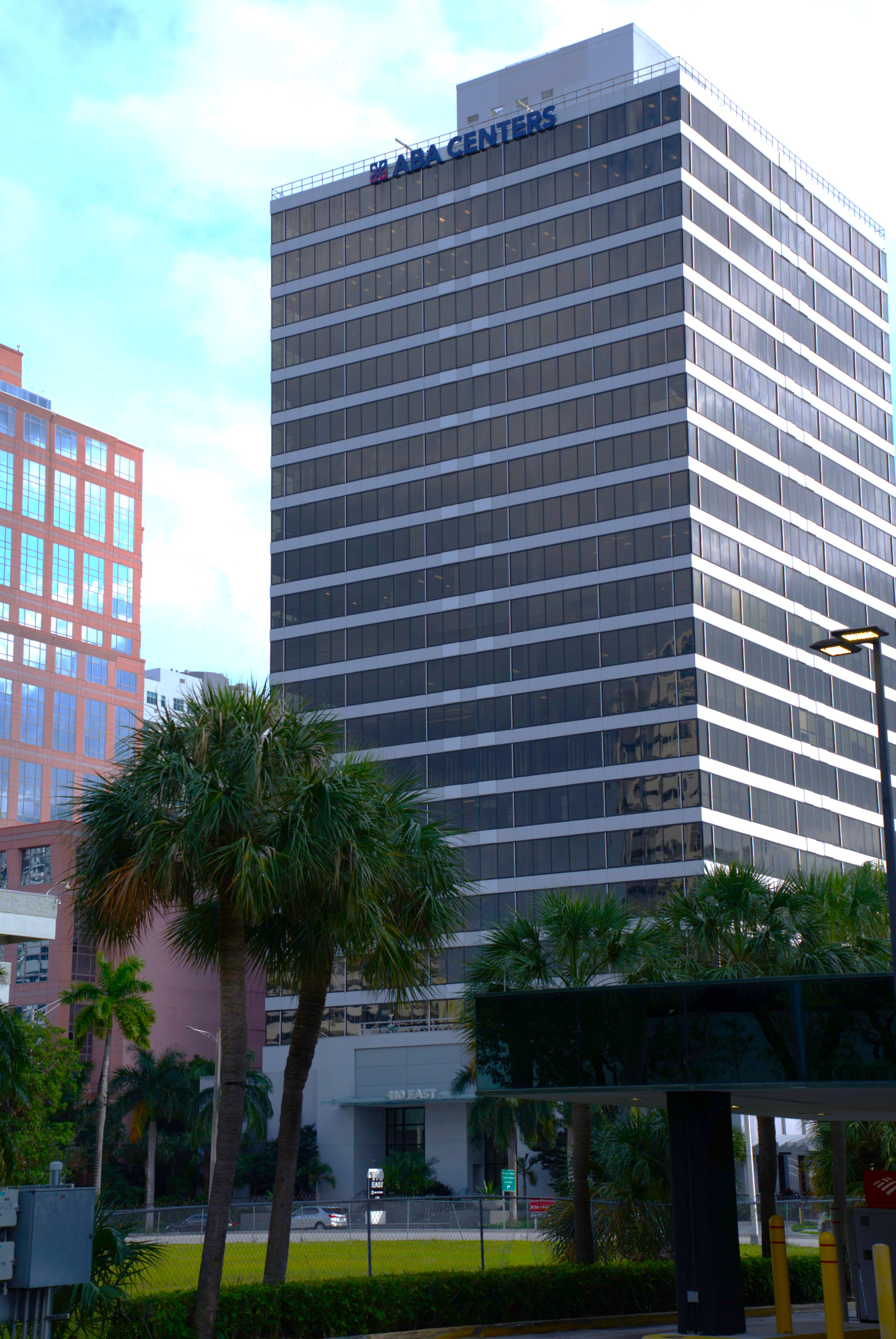
Named for the company, the ABA Centers headquarters building sits at 110 E. Broward Blvd in downtown Fort Lauderdale.

ABA Centers of America is a United States–based healthcare company that provides applied behavior analysis (ABA) and diagnostic services to autistic children. The company was founded in 2020 and is headquartered in Fort Lauderdale, Florida. As of October 2026, the company is under federal criminal investigation for allegedly defrauding federal and private healthcare programs; it has also been accused of overbilling and insurance fraud in two pending civil lawsuits originally filed in 2025.

== Business model and corporate structure ==
ABA Centers of America is owned by ICBD Holdings. The company maintains its headquarters in Fort Lauderdale, Florida, and operates regional offices in New England and elsewhere. It provides services through physical centers and in-home programs in various states, including Massachusetts and New Hampshire. The company primarily bills clients' health insurance plans as an out-of-network provider (a provider who has not entered into a billing contract with an insurer), a rare practice in the ABA industry, which often leaves patients responsible for the full cost of denied claims. In October 2026, the company told the Sun Sentinel, "We always knew that our business model is disruptive to the status quo and upends current business models for both providers and payors."

== History ==
ABA Centers of America was founded in 2020 by Christopher Barnett, an entrepreneur with a background in healthcare and business development. Barnett established the company after personal experiences seeking care for his autistic daughter. The organization was created to address issues, including long diagnostic wait times and limited availability of services.

ABA Centers of America opened its first autism-focused care center in 2020. Between 2020 and 2023, it reported substantial revenue increases, and was cited by the Financial Times and Inc. magazine for its growth over this period. By mid-2023, the company reported serving more than 700 children.

Following a $1 million donation from Barnett in October 2022, Temple University's College of Public Health established an autism-focused research, training, and diagnostic hub named after ABA Centers of America.

In June 2026, healthcare services company Optum terminated its business relationship with ABA Centers of America. Later that month, ABA Centers of America began a months-long downsizing of its workforce, including the termination of individual clinical directors (consolidating leadership regionally) and all behavior-technician paraprofessionals who did not become industry-certified within 90 days of hiring. The company also ceased operations in the state of Ohio.

=== Legal issues and fraud allegations ===
==== Civil lawsuits ====
In December 2024, ABA Centers of America sued Point32Health—the parent company of Harvard Pilgrim Health Care—in Massachusetts Superior Court, demanding $80 million in compensation for delayed claims. The defendants countersued in October 2025, demanding $19 million. The countersuit alleged ABA Centers of America grossly inflated its reimbursement rates and submitted fraudulent claims and documentation (including $1.9 million improperly billed using a physician-specific code and $137,000 improperly billed for non-therapeutic movie screenings and trampoline-park visits). The countersuit also accused the company of taking kickbacks by falsely reporting the collection of patient fees it had routinely waived, as well as artificially creating in-network provider scarcity by encouraging licensed behavior analysts to drop their industry certifications.

In August 2025, ABA Centers of America sued the supermarket chain Publix in Florida state court, demanding compensation for partially paid and unpaid claims it submitted to Publix's employee health insurance plans. Publix countersued ABA Centers of America in federal court the same month, alleging the company submitted over $7 million in grossly inflated and fraudulent out-of-network health insurance claims. Publix filed an amended complaint in September 2025, alleging fraud totaling approximately $15 million. The lawsuit also alleged ABA Centers of America engaged in organized crime as defined by the Racketeer Influenced and Corrupt Organizations Act. In August 2026, U.S. District Judge Raag Singhal dismissed three of Publix's nine claims against the company without prejudice; the claims Publix was allowed to proceed with included civil racketeering, fraud, and unjust enrichment.

==== Alleged assault of patient ====
In June 2026, Tracy Baptiste—an industry-certified behavior technician employed at an ABA Centers of America service location in Alpharetta, Georgia—was arrested by police and charged with child cruelty and battery; she was released the following month on a $10,000 bond. The charges were related to a February 2026 incident in which Baptiste allegedly assaulted a 16-year-old autistic patient in her care. Baptiste's lawyer claimed in a July 2026 statement that she was innocent of the charges against her and had "acted appropriately and in accordance with established safety protocols during a difficult behavioral incident." ABA Centers of America declined to comment on Baptiste's employment status and would not publicly disclose details related to the incident, citing federal privacy laws, including the Health Insurance Portability and Accountability Act. Prior to Baptiste's arrest, the company released information related to the incident (including the patient's medical records) directly to investigators after being served with two court orders compelling them to do so. Investigators also took witness statements from Baptiste's co-workers, which they characterized as inconsistent.

==== Federal criminal investigation ====
In July 2026, the United States District Court for the District of New Hampshire unsealed search warrants initially requested in February and December 2025 by the Office of Inspector General of the United States Department of Health and Human Services. The February warrant targeted Barnett's Microsoft e-mail and OneDrive accounts, and the December warrant targeted 25 e-mail accounts belonging to 14 other individuals (mostly members of ABA Centers of America's corporate leadership and the leadership of related ICBD-owned companies). The warrants cited the following alleged crimes: false statements in healthcare matters, wire fraud, healthcare fraud, conspiracy to commit healthcare and wire fraud, conspiracy to commit money laundering, and transacting in criminal proceeds. The unsealed documents alleged that ABA Centers of America fraudulently billed federal and private healthcare programs. They also alleged Barnett used his share of the illegal profits to make extravagant purchases, including luxury cars, a private jet (valued at approximately $10 million), and the lease of a waterfront home in Fort Lauderdale (valued at approximately $20 million). In September 2026, while publicly denying the allegations, Barnett resigned from Temple University's board of trustees and, in concurrence with university leadership, withdrew his pledge to donate an additional $55 million to the school. The university also reversed its decision to rename its College of Public Health in Barnett's honor. The unsealed search warrants were first reported on via Substack in early September 2026 by Samantha Parnham, an Oregon-based licensed behavior analyst who had been independently investigating Barnett and ABA Centers of America. In October 2026, ABA Centers of America acknowledged the company was under criminal investigation and stated, "We are working with federal investigators and will respond at the appropriate time."

== Management ==
- Christopher Barnett – Founder and Chairman
- Jason Barker – Chief Executive Officer
- Evin O. Driscoll – Vice President, Sales & Revenue Operations

== Recognition and awards ==
ABA Centers of America has been recognized by regional and national business media for its growth:

- Financial Times Americas' Fastest-Growing Companies 2025: Ranked No. 1 with a reported growth rate of 33,511.5 percent between 2020 and 2023.
- Inc. 5000 (2025): Ranked No. 25 among the fastest-growing private companies in the United States.
- Inc. 5000 (2024): Ranked No. 5 nationwide.
- EY Entrepreneur of the Year 2024: Founder Christopher Barnett received the U.S. overall award from Ernst & Young.
- South Florida Business Journal: Recognized as one of the fastest-growing companies with revenue over $25 million in South Florida in 2024.
