= Equal Value of Life Years Gained =

Measure of how much a treatment extends a patient's life

The Equal Value of Life Years or evLY is a summary measure of the length and quality of life that differs from traditional measurement in that the additional years of life gained by treatment are weighted using a uniform estimate regardless of age, disease, or level of disability. In traditional cost-effectiveness analysis, health gains are often measured using quality-adjusted life years (QALYs), which weight life-years gained by an individual and disease-specific quality-of-life estimate. To complement the use of QALYs, the Institute for Clinical and Economic Review (ICER) developed the evLY to value each life year gained equally regardless of patient characteristics. By presenting health gains in terms of both evLYs and QALYs, policy makers can take a broader view of the value of medical interventions.

== Calculation ==
In calculating evLY, all additional years of life gained from a treatment are considered to be “full health,” regardless of the health state of the patient during the additional years of life. “Full health” is defined as the average health of the general U.S. population, and set at 0.851 on a 0-1 scale. If the health state of the patient during the additional years of life is less than 0.851, the evLY is likely to be higher than the QALY, and vice versa.

In most cases, this measurement makes treatments appear to have a greater impact on quality-adjusted life extension relative to the QALY, even if the patient is disabled, elderly, or terminally ill.

== Use ==
The evLY is a measurement tool developed and used by the Institute for Clinical and Economic Review. The Centers for Medicare and Medicaid Services has acknowledged the availability of other cost-effectiveness measures such as the evLY metric for Medicare drug price negotiations, but the decision to implement the metric has not yet been made.

== Criticism ==
Critics argue that the evLY relies on generic Patient Reported Outcomes for specific medical cases. In other words, the metric is attempting to be a “one-size-fits-all” solution for a very diverse patient group. Others argue that general “community” weighting is in fact more appropriate for cost-effectiveness analyses conducted to inform population-level health decisions, given the need to fund treatments for all conditions.

Other critics argue that the evLY metric ignores the potential to improve quality of life as it lengthens survival. For example, two treatments may provide the same extension of life, but one treatment might be associated with significant side effects while the other is not. These two treatments would be seen as providing the same value under the evLY metric, despite the additional benefits provided by the latter.

Another criticism is that the evLY metric does not offer any advantage over QALYs when the medical condition is not life-threatening. For example, a treatment for blindness would produce estimates of QALYs and evLYs that are identical, since treating blindness doesn’t directly expand the patient’s lifespan. The Institute for Clinical and Economic Review has argued for presentations of evLYs and QALYs in every analysis it conducts, so that readers can see where estimates of health gain differ and where they do not.
