= Tufts Health Plan =

- Industry: Medical industry
- Founded: 1979
- Fate: Merged with Harvard Pilgrim Health Care to form Point32Health
- Successor: Point32Health
- Headquarters: 1 Wellness Way; Canton, Massachusetts
- Area served: Massachusetts, New Hampshire, Rhode Island
- Key people: Cain A. Hayes (CEO)
- Products: Health insurance
- Number of employees: 2,400
- Website: tuftshealthplan.com

Tufts Health Plan was a Massachusetts-based non-profit health insurance company under Tufts Associated Health Plans, Inc. with headquarters in Watertown, Massachusetts. It completed a merger with Harvard Pilgrim Health Care on January 1, 2021, making the then unnamed company the second-largest health insurer in Massachusetts. The merger had been announced on August 14, 2019; the combined company serves 2.4 million members in Massachusetts, Maine, Connecticut, New Hampshire, and Rhode Island. On June 15, 2021, the new name of the parent company was announced as Point32Health, named for the 32 points on a compass.

Tufts Health Plan was founded in 1979 by Morton Madoff., M.D., dean of Tufts University School of Medicine. As of May 2019, the organization had over 1 million members.

== History ==
Morton Madoff, M.D., of Tufts University Medical School, founded Tufts Associated Health Maintenance Organization, Inc. in 1979. The organization started offering plans in 1981, ending its first year with 3,000 members.

In 1995, Tufts Health Plan launched its first PPO (preferred provider organization) plans. In 1996 Tufts Health Plan was ranked as a top HMO provider in the United States by Newsweek.

In 2008, Tufts Health Plan created the Tufts Health Plan Foundation so the health plan's assets could help address long-standing health care issues in the local community. The foundation funds approximately $5 million annually in investments and grants to local non-profits.

In 2011, Tufts Health Plan acquired Network Health, a Medicaid plan.

In 2015, Tufts Health Plan acquired Integra Partners, a medical equipment and prosthetics management company backed by Peterson Partners.

Also in 2015, Tufts Health Plan entered into a joint venture with Granite Health, a network of five health systems, creating Tufts Health Freedom Plan of New Hampshire.

In 2016, the company transformed core business operations to HealthEdge.

In 2017, Tufts Health Plan signed contracts to form Medicaid (MassHealth) Accountable Care Organization (ACO) partnerships with four provider organizations: Atrius Health, Beth Israel Deaconess Care Organization, Cambridge Health Alliance, and Boston Children's Accountable Care Organization. Also in 2017, Tufts Health Plan entered the Rhode Island Medicaid market.

In February 2018, Tufts Health Plan entered into a joint venture with Hartford HealthCare, creating CarePartners of Connecticut, which offers Medicare Advantage plans to eligible beneficiaries.

On January 26, 2021, Tufts Health Plan announced the completion of their merger with Harvard Pilgrim Health Care.

In July 2021, Tufts Health Plan awarded the Metropolitan Boston Housing Partnership with a grant of $170,000.
