= Harvard Pilgrim Health Care =

American non-profit health company

- Founded: 1994
- Type: Nonprofit organization
- Headquarters: Canton, Massachusetts, United States
- Region served: Massachusetts, Maine, Connecticut, New Hampshire, Rhode Island
- Products: Health insurance plans
- Members: 2.4 million (combined with Tufts Health Plan)
- Parent organization: Point32Health (since 2021)
- Website: www.harvardpilgrim.org

Harvard Pilgrim Health Care is a non-profit health services company based in Canton, Massachusetts, serving the New England region of the United States.

On August 14, 2019, the boards of Harvard Pilgrim Health Care and Tufts Health Plan announced plans for the two insurers to merge their organizations into a new company. The new company serves 2.4 million members in Massachusetts, Maine, Connecticut, New Hampshire, and Rhode Island. The merger completed on January 1, 2021, making the then unnamed company the second largest health insurer in Massachusetts. On June 15, 2021, the new name of the parent company was announced as Point32Health, named for the 32 points on a compass.

== Overview ==
Harvard Pilgrim Health Care was formed in 1994 from the merger of the Harvard Community Health Plan (HCHP) and the Pilgrim Health Plan. Harvard Community Health Plan had been founded in 1969. One of its founders was Maurice Lazarus.

Harvard Pilgrim is home to the Harvard Pilgrim Health Care Institute, a collaboration with Harvard Medical School. As Harvard Medical School’s Department of Population Medicine, the Institute is the only appointing department of a U.S. medical school housed within a health plan. Funded primarily through external government and private sources, it provides information to the health care system on issues affecting population health and health care delivery.

== Legal dispute ==
In December 2024, applied behavior analysis provider ABA Centers of America sued Point32Health and Harvard Pilgrim Health Care in Massachusetts Superior Court, demanding $80 million in compensation for delayed claims. The defendants countersued in October 2025, demanding $19 million. The countersuit alleged ABA Centers of America grossly inflated its reimbursement rates and submitted fraudulent claims and documentation (including $1.9 million improperly billed using a physician-specific code and $137,000 improperly billed for non-therapeutic movie screenings and trampoline-park visits). The countersuit also accused the company of taking kickbacks by falsely reporting the collection of patient fees it had routinely waived, as well as artificially creating in-network provider scarcity by encouraging licensed behavior analysts to drop their industry certifications.

== Awards and recognition ==
- Boston Business Journal - a Best Place to Work (2003 - 2017)
- Boston Business Journal - a Top Corporate Philanthropist (2007 - 2015)
- The Boston Globe - a Top Place to Work (2009 - 2015)
- Human Rights Campaign - a Best Place to Work (2013 - 2016)
