= University of Washington School of Pharmacy =

Coordinates: 47.6510546°N 122.3092414°W

School of Pharmacy
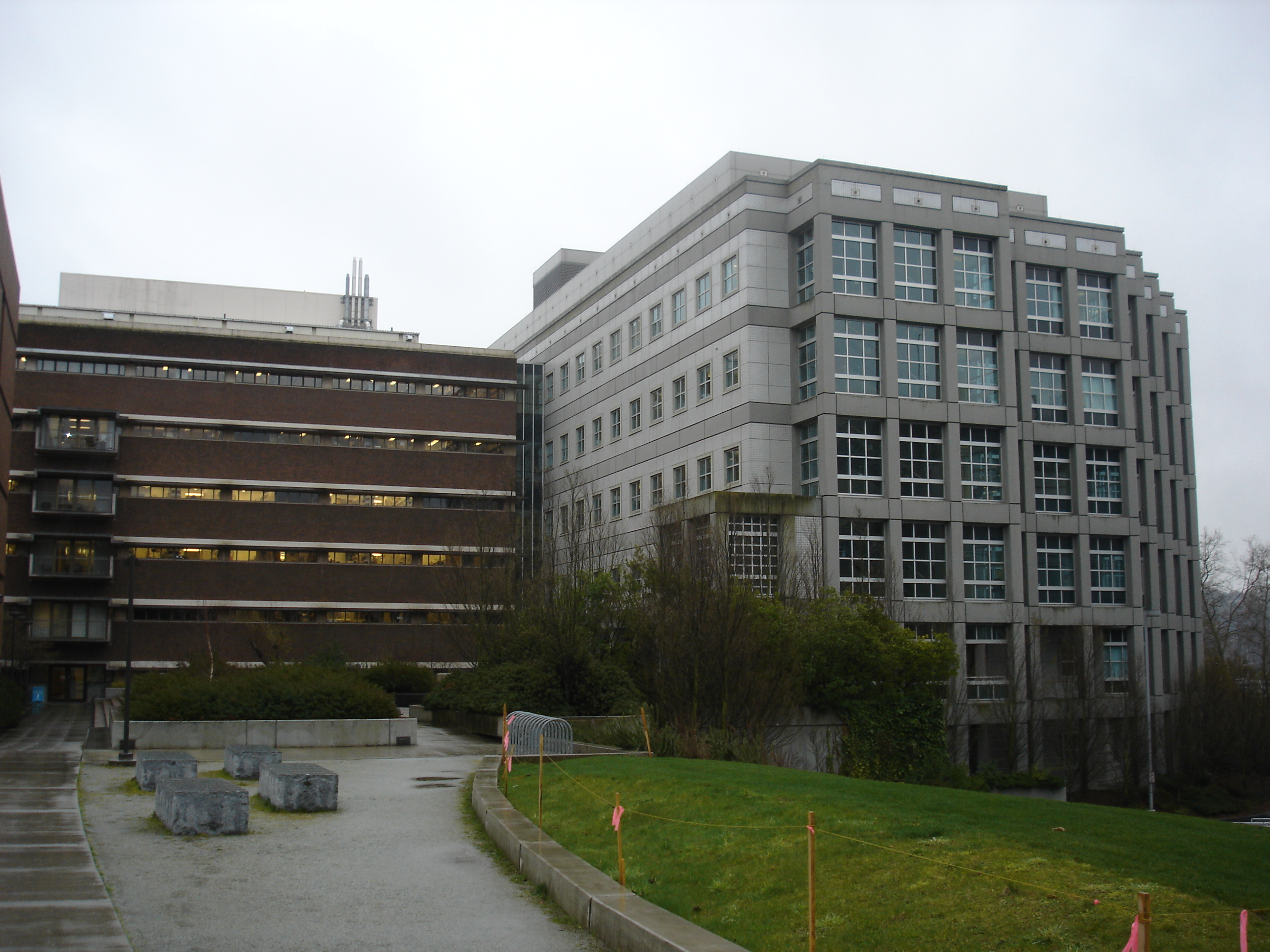
- Classes and offices are mostly located within the Warren G. Magnuson Health Sciences Building
- Type: Public
- Established: 1894
- Dean: Jayanth Panyam
- Location: Seattle, Washington, US
- Website: sop.washington.edu

The School of Pharmacy is the pharmacy school of the University of Washington, a public research university in Seattle, Washington.

The school was founded in 1894 and included four women in its inaugural class of students. It is one of two PharmD granting institutions within the state of Washington. Offices are located within the Warren G. Magnuson Health Sciences Building on the University of Washington campus. U.S. News & World Report ranked the School of Pharmacy as tied for the seventh-best pharmacy school in the United States in 2020.

As of 2015, the school has 381 PharmD students, 59 PhD students, and 40 Master of Science students and is 64% female.

In August 2023, Jayanth Panyam became dean of the University of Washington School of Pharmacy.
