= Anderson Towne Center =

Shopping mall in Cincinnati, Ohio, U.S.

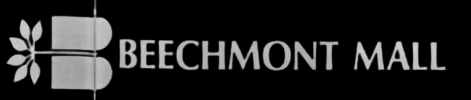
- The original Beechmont Mall logo used in 1969
- Location: Cincinnati, Ohio, U.S.
- Coordinates: 39°04′27″N 84°21′00″W
- Address: 7500 Beechmont Avenue
- Opened: 1969 (as Beechmont Mall); 2003 (as Anderson Towne Center)
- Previous names: Beechmont Mall
- Developer: Carl H. Lindner, Robert D. Lindner
- Owner: Victory Real Estate Investments
- Num. of stores: 40
- Num. of anchor tenants: 4
- Floor area: 320,845 square feet (29,807.5 m^{2})
- Floors: 1 (3 in Macy's)
- Public transit: Metro

Anderson Towne Center is a shopping mall in Cincinnati, Ohio, United States. Built in 1969 as Beechmont Mall, it originally included John Shillito Company (Shillito's) and Mabley & Carew as its major anchor stores, with Gold Circle joining in 1980. Each anchor store changed names twice during the original mall's history: Shillito's became Shillito-Rikes and then Lazarus, Mabley & Carew became Elder-Beerman and then Parisian, while Gold Circle became Hills and then Kmart. Between 2002 and 2003, the center was demolished except for the Lazarus and Kmart buildings, and renamed to Anderson Towne Center. Following the conversion of Lazarus to Macy's and the closure of Kmart in 2013, the center's present anchor stores are Macy's, Kroger, Sky Zone, and Crunch Fitness.

== History ==
Plans for Beechmont Mall were first announced in September 1967. Developer Carl H. Lindner and his brother Robert D. Lindner announced that the mall's anchor stores would be two local department stores: John Shillito Company (Shillito's) and Mabley & Carew, with over 600,000 square feet (56,000 m^{2}) of retail space occupying 50 acres (20 ha). Manuel D. Meyerson and Associates served as leasing agent for both anchor stores. According to the initially announced plans, the Shillito store was to consist of two levels, with the lower level mainly consisting of apparel, shoes, toys, and sporting goods, while the upper level would feature furnishings, household goods, appliances, and discounted merchandise. Baxter, Hodell, Donnelly & Preston was hired as the architectural firm to design the Mabley & Carew store. The mall's location was chosen on Beechmont Avenue (SR 125) in Anderson Township. Construction began in October 1968, with projected costs of $14 million. By this point, several tenants had been confirmed for the mall, including Lerner New York (now known as New York & Company), Waldenbooks, Kinney Shoes, F. W. Woolworth Company, Florsheim Shoes, Casual Corner, Swiss Colony, 5-7-9, along with Thriftway Supermarket and SupeRx Drugs. The Lindner brothers sold the mall to Prudential Financial in 1977.

=== 1970s–1990s expansions ===
The first change to come to the mall was in 1978, when Dayton, Ohio-based Elder-Beerman purchased all four locations of Mabley & Carew. Four years later, Federated Department Stores (now Macy's, Inc.) merged Shillito's with the Rike Kumler Co. (Rike's), another Dayton-based department store, and dual-branded all locations as Shillito-Rikes. In 1983, Beechmont Mall underwent an expansion whose construction costs were valued at $2,000,000. This expansion consisted of adding a Gold Circle discount store (also owned by Federated) to the north end of the mall, while relocating the Thriftway supermarket to a larger location on the mall's periphery. In addition, the older Thriftway location would become a food court. Further consolidation by Federated affected the two anchor stores under its ownership throughout the late 1980s. In 1986, the company merged the Shillito-Rike's stores with Lazarus, a department store based in Columbus, Ohio. As a result, Beechmont's western anchor was remodeled and converted to Lazarus that year. Two years later, following the acquisition of Federated by the Campeau Corporation, the Gold Circle chain was sold to Kimco Realty, which leased all of the Cincinnati-area locations to Hills that year. Woolworth closed at the mall in 1989 when its lease was not renewed, and its space was subdivided for smaller stores. In addition, Limited Brands (now L Brands) expanded its presence at the mall by downsizing Lerner New York for The Limited while also adding a branch of its sister brand Limited Express (now Express). Many of these changes were instigated by MetLife, which had acquired the mall from Prudential in 1987, and sought to target more white-collar worker demographics by bringing in more fashion-oriented tenants.

Hills closed the store in June 1991 and five months later it was converted to Kmart, which relocated from an existing store 1 mile (1.6 km) to the west at Cherry Grove Plaza. Elder-Beerman closed its store at Beechmont Mall in 1992 after deeming that renovations to the store would be too costly. The store was sold that same year to Parisian, a department store chain based out of Birmingham, Alabama which had begun seeking other Cincinnati-area locations after the initial success of their location at Forest Fair Mall (now Forest Fair Village). In addition, a TGI Friday's restaurant opened at the mall the same year. Further renovations in 1993 included expanded locations for existing tenants Claire's, GNC, and B. Dalton. MetLife proposed renovation plans for the mall in 1994, which would include new entrances and expansion of the food court. Gap and Bombay Company also opened at the mall at this point, and mall management cited these stores as examples of the tenants desired in creating a more upscale image for the mall.

=== 1990s: Decline ===
Despite the addition of these new stores, the mall's occupancy rate began to decline throughout the late 1990s due to its age, its smaller size than other malls, and increased competition from the then-newly expanded Kenwood Towne Centre. MetLife put the mall up for sale in 1996, but withdrew the sale after lack of interest. MetLife auctioned Beechmont and nine other malls under its ownership in 1997, and Zamias Services, Inc. bought all ten that December. By 1998, many major tenants had left the mall, including Gap, Express, and Lane Bryant. As a result, Zamias sought renovation plans, with proposals including a multiplex movie theater Parisian closed at the mall in late 1999 due to declining sales.

Goldman Sachs acquired the mall from Zamias in 1999. The company proposed tearing down the mall and redeveloping it as an outdoor shopping center, but declined at the time due to concerns that redevelopment would not yield a large enough return on investment. Delays in redevelopment, combined with the expiration of tenant leases, contributed to an increasingly high vacancy rate at the beginning of the 21st century; by 2001, The Cincinnati Enquirer described the mall as a "ghost town" with "a handful of smaller stores" alongside Lazarus and Kmart. Victory Real Estate of Columbus, Georgia was announced as a potential buyer in November of that year. After buying the property, Victory Real Estate renamed it to Anderson Towne Center and announced that they would begin converting it to an outdoor mall. These plans called for the demolition of everything except for the Kmart and Lazarus buildings, along with the addition of exterior-facing retail suites and new locations for TGI Friday's and CVS Pharmacy, two of the only remaining tenants at the time. Demolition began in January 2003. Also included in the redevelopment would be a 104,000-square-foot (9,700 m^{2}) Kroger supermarket, then the largest in the chain, on the site of the former Parisian. In addition, the Lazarus store was renovated. Kroger opened for business in November 2004. The rest of the renovated center opened in 2005, by which point the Lazarus store had been re-branded as Macy's. At the time of reopening, the new mall had multiple vacancies, but township representatives and mall owners noted that this was due to several leases having not yet been finalized.

Kmart closed at Anderson Towne Center in 2014. Five years later, the former Kmart was torn down for an AMC Theatres multiplex theater and a Crunch Fitness. Other tenants joining in 2019 included Sky Zone trampoline park and Bar Louie restaurant, while Macy's expanded its store with a branch of its discount division Macy's Backstage.
