= County of Clinton =

County of Clinton may refer to:

== Australia ==
- County of Clinton, Queensland

== United States ==
- Clinton County
