= John Shillito Company =

Department store in Cincinnati, Ohio

John Shillito & Company
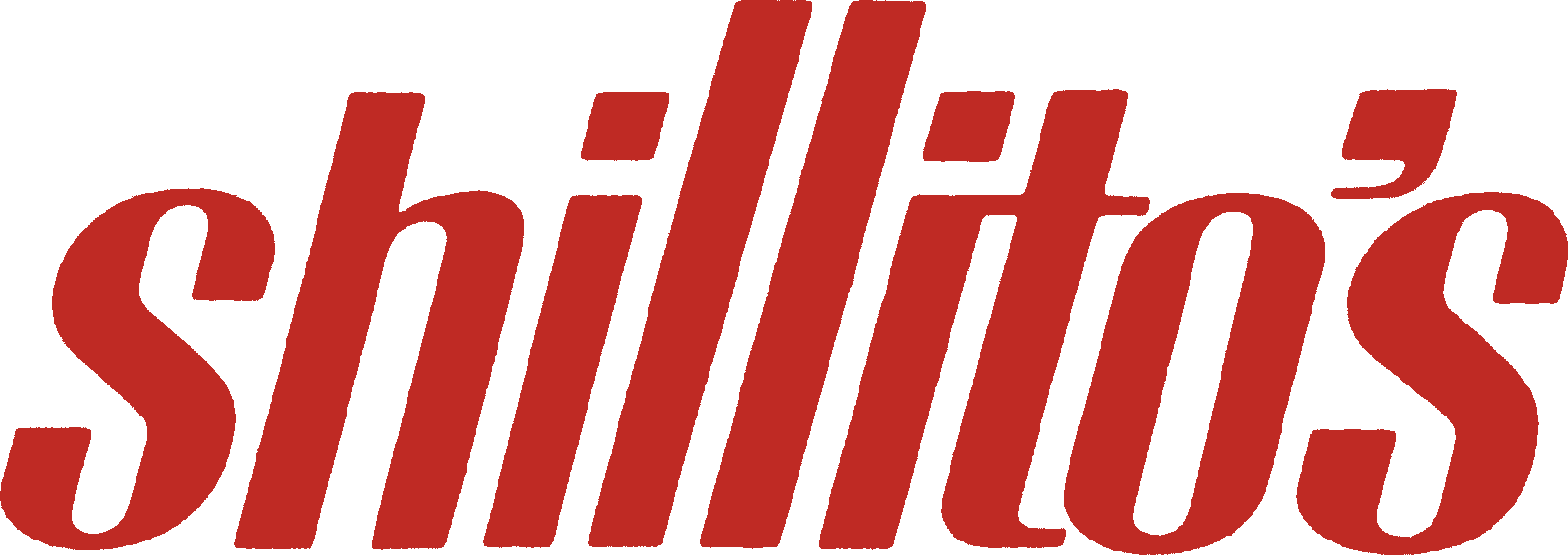

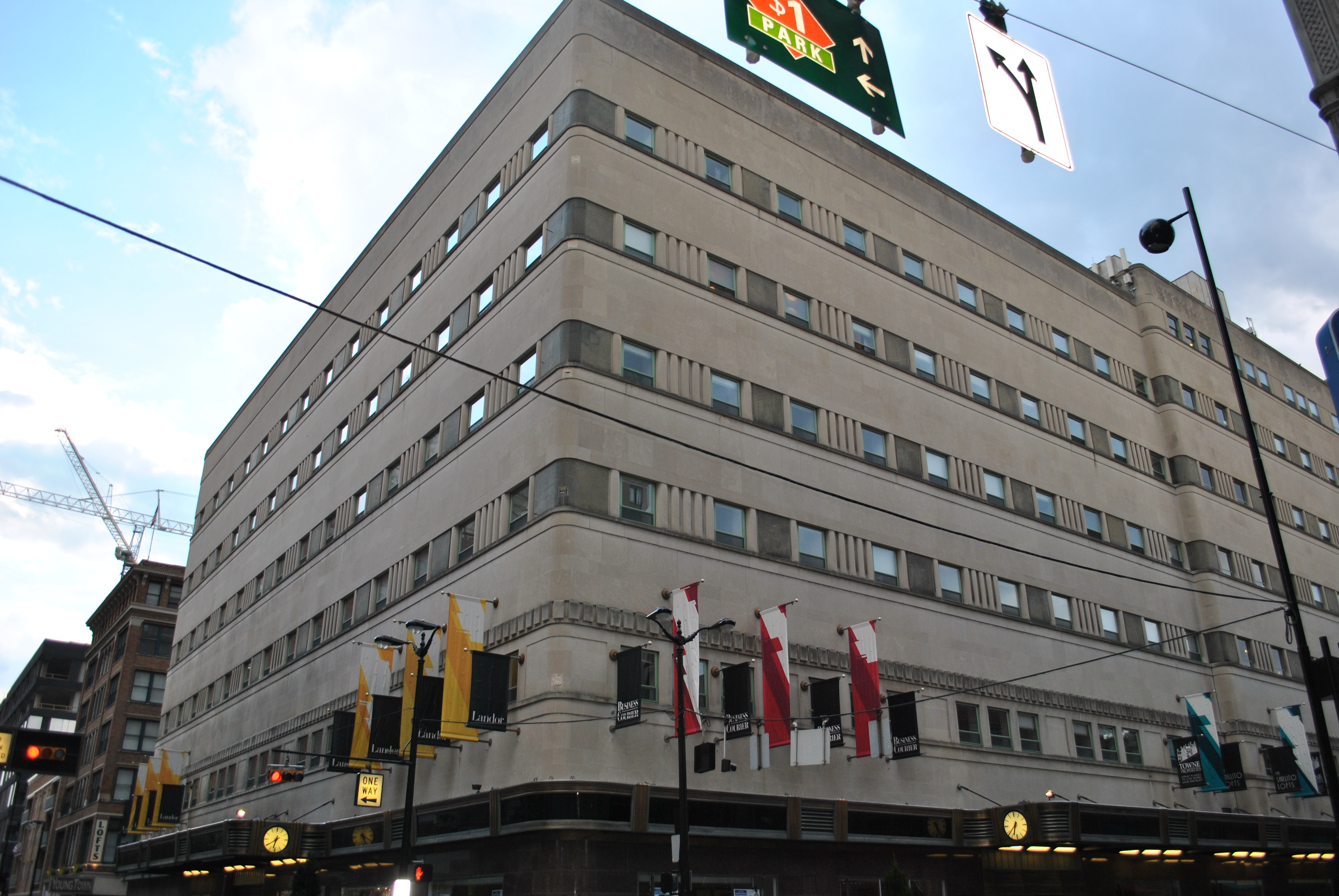
- Exterior of the former shillito’s flagship store in Cincinnati, Ohio
- Type: Subsidiary
- Industry: Retail
- Genre: Department Store
- Founded: 1830; 196 years ago
- Defunct: 1986; 40 years ago
- Fate: Converted into Lazarus
- Successor: Lazarus (1986–2005); Macy’s (2005–present)
- Parent: Lazarus (1928–1929); Federated Department Stores (1929–1986)
- Website: None

John Shillito & Company (commonly known as Shillito's) was Cincinnati's first department store.

== History ==
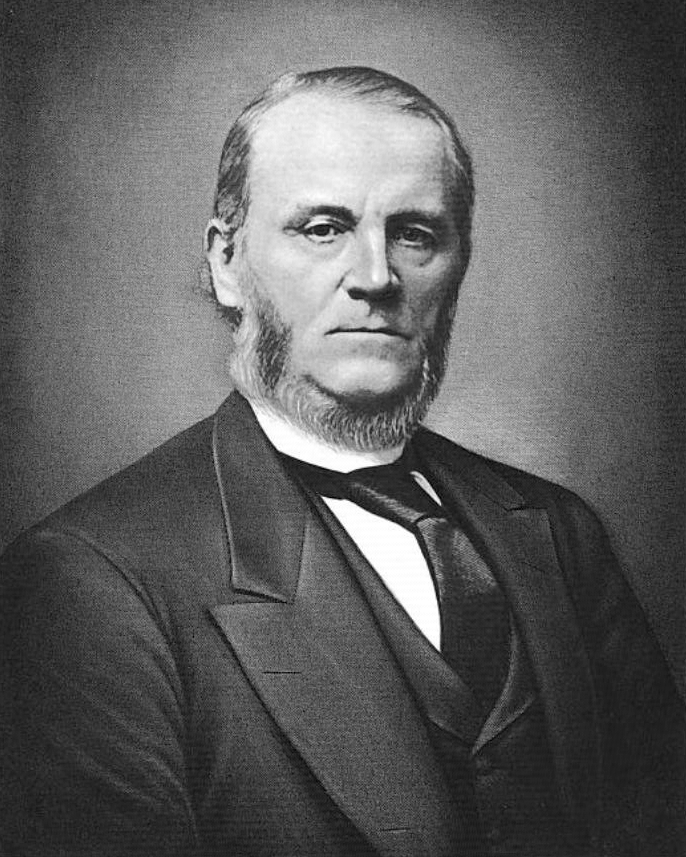
John Shillito

In 1817, John Shillito (November 1808 – September 1879) arrived in Cincinnati (from Greensburg, Pennsylvania). The nine-year-old lad was soon working for the Cincinnati business Blatchley & Simpson. In 1830, he left to form a partnership with William McLaughlin, selling dry goods. A year later, McLaughlin left the company, and was replaced with Robert W. Burnett and James Pullen.

The firm of Shillito, Burnett & Pullen outgrew its first location, and in 1833 moved to the other side of Main Street between 4th and 5th Streets. In 1837, John Shillito bought out his partners and moved to larger quarters on the north side of 4th Street. He gained sole ownership of the store in 1842.

In 1857, John Shillito acquired property on the other side of the street, and built a five-story department story, the largest such building in the city. It was designed by Cincinnati architect James W. McLaughlin, the son of his first partner. When the company vacated the building in 1879, the space was occupied by a competitor, The McAlpin Company. By 2018, the building had been converted into a condominium dwelling, "The McAlpin".

In spite of its impressive size, the Fourth Street store was not enough to contain the business after two decades. Shillito again used architect McLaughlin to erect an L-shaped six-story building with basement and sub-cellar on the SW corner of Race and Seventh Streets, moving his store there in 1879. The building's iron interior structure was considered fireproof. It was gas-lit throughout and sported a 58-foot diameter skylight dome. Two passenger elevators supplemented the building's marble staircases (there were also two freight elevators). The business used over a thousand employees.

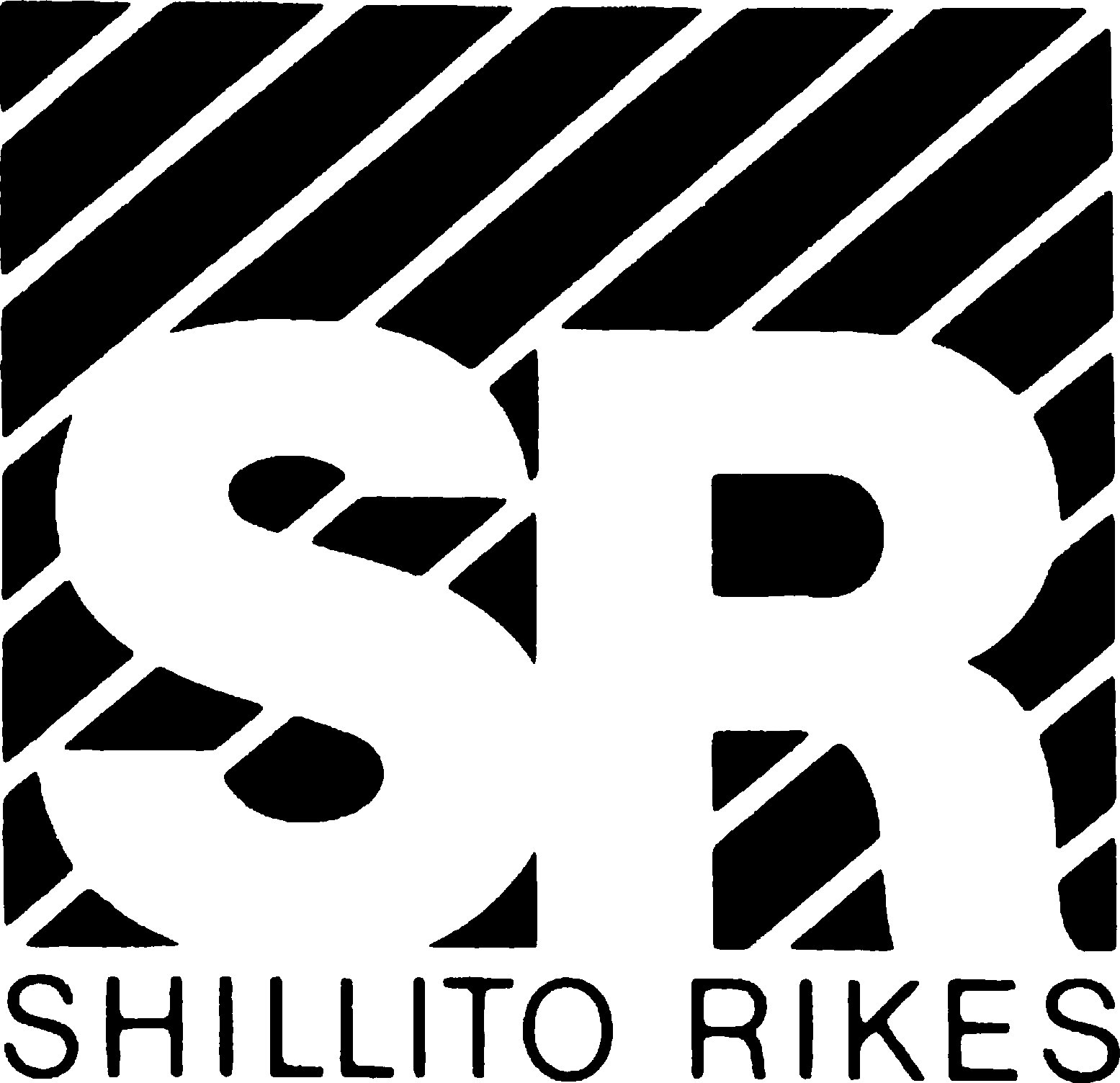
Shillito-Rikes logo

John Shillito died soon after opening his latest building, and his son Stewart Shillito then ran the company. When Stewart Shillito died in 1925, the company was sold to the Lazarus Company, but the Shillito name remained. Branch stores were built at new outlying suburban malls: Tri-County Mall (1960), Western Woods (1963), Beechmont Mall (1969), Oxmoor Mall (Louisville, Kentucky, 1971), Fayette Mall (Lexington, Kentucky, 1971), Florence Mall (Florence, Kentucky, 1977) and Jefferson Mall (Louisville, 1979).

The Shillito name was merged with corporate sibling Rike's to form Shillito-Rike's in 1982; the name was dropped altogether in 1986 in favor of Lazarus. On 6 March 2005, the Lazarus name was dropped and stores now operate under the Macy's brand name.

The 1990 film A Mom for Christmas, was shot at the store representing the fictional Millimans department store set out in the film.

The landmark Shillito's department store building has been converted into the Lofts at Shillito Place luxury apartments. It is a contributing property to the Race Street Historic District. When the building was renovated in 1998, the developer was surprised to uncover the atrium space with the original octagonal skylight, which was then updated with energy-efficient materials. At present there are 96 loft-style apartments on seven floors and office space on the main floor.

== Business practices ==
From its early days, the Shillito company motto was "Truth Always - Facts Only". John Shillito maintained his image as honest, and also dedicated himself to improving the Cincinnati civic experience.

By the 1880s, the John Shillito Company was distributing 24-page sales booklets, with stories of humorous or informative visits to the store.

The company was an early embracer of the African-American community. In 1946, it was the first department store to give credit, offer employment, and advance African-Americans in management positions. The Cincinnati store's restaurant was the first to serve all patrons.

== See also ==
- Cincinnati Gymnasium and Athletic Club, a historic property behind the landmark Shillito's
- McAlpin's
- List of department stores converted to Macy's
