= Salem Mall =

Defunct mall in Montgomery County, Ohio, U.S.

Coordinates: 39.82096°N 84.27883°W

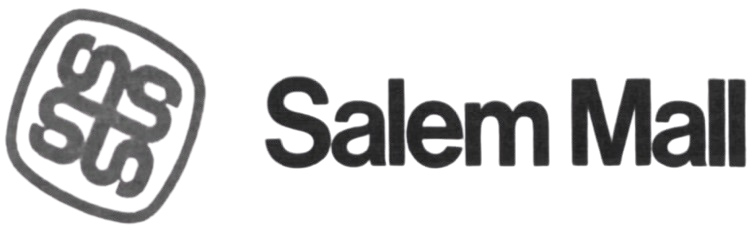

- JCPenney wing
- Location: Trotwood, Ohio, U.S.
- Address: 5200 Salem Avenue
- Opened: October 26, 1966; 60 years ago
- Closed: 2005; 21 years ago
- Demolished: May 15, 2006
- Developer: The Rouse Company
- Owner: City of Trotwood
- Architect: Daverman & Associates
- Num. of stores: 100+ (at peak)
- Num. of anchor tenants: 3 (at peak)
- Floor area: 871,000 square feet (80,900 m^{2})
- Floors: 2
- Building details

Design and construction
- Structural engineer: Broyles & Broyles
- Main contractor: Henry C. Beck Contractors

Salem Mall was a regional mall in Trotwood, Ohio, a suburb of Dayton, Ohio, United States. It was developed in 1966 by The Rouse Company and originally featured Rike's and Sears as its main anchor stores. Expansion in 1981 added a new wing of stores and JCPenney, while further renovations in that same decade included a food court. Rike's was later dual-branded as Shillito-Rike's and then renamed to Lazarus The mall began to lose stores throughout the 1990s, including both Lazarus and JCPenney, the former of which was torn down for The Home Depot. After an extended period of decline, the mall closed in 2005 and was demolished in 2006. Sears, which was excluded from the demolition, remained operational until it closed in 2013. In 2022, it was announced that a large portion of the mall would become the new site of The Funk Music Hall of Fame and Exhibition Center.

== History ==
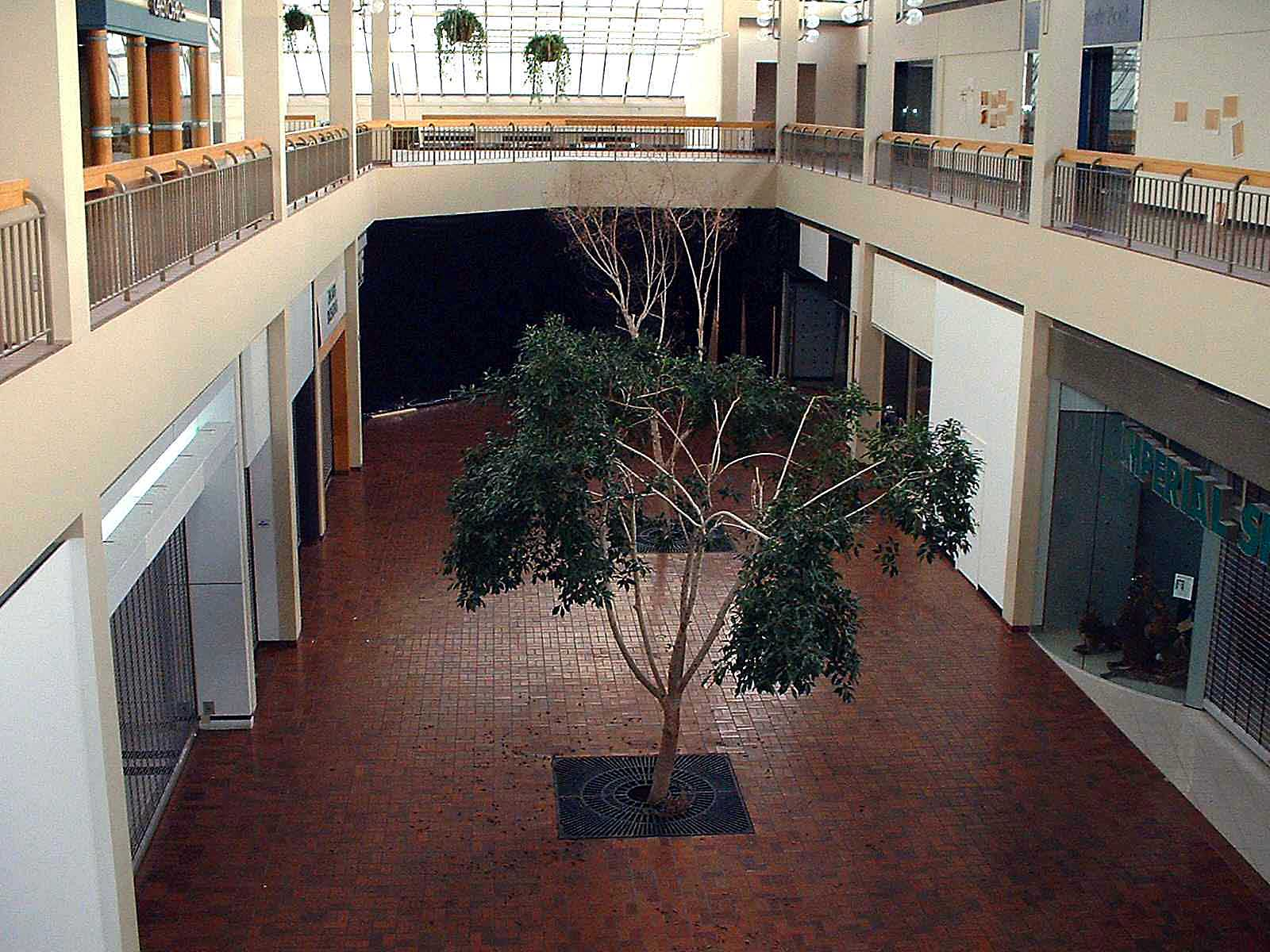
Main wing

It was located at the intersection of Shiloh Springs Road and Salem Avenue, in the northwest Dayton suburb of Trotwood, Ohio. The mall was built on the site of the former Roscoe Filburn farm. Salem Mall, Inc., a subsidiary of The Rouse Company,opened the mall in October 1966. In its early stages it had 60 retailers; the original mall was anchored by Rike's and Sears department stores. There was also a Liberal supermarket, a smaller department store called The Metropolitan, and a multi-screen cinema.

A large-scale renovation was completed in 1981 with the construction of a two-story concourse ending in a JCPenney anchor store (relocated from the nearby Forest Park Plaza). The supermarket, which was closed by 1979, had its space subdivided into inline stores. While the expansion included a food court, it was pretty much an afterthought and had limited seating. So when The Metropolitan closed in the mid-1980s, its space was extensively reworked to form a much larger food court adjacent to the center court. The mall, which by that time featured over 110 retailers, was prosperous throughout the remainder of the 1980s.

=== Decline and closure ===
By the mid-1980s, poor mall management affected the mall's ability to attract new tenants, renew existing leases, and most importantly, attract serious shoppers. By the mid- to late-1990s, the mall was well on its way to becoming a so-called "dead mall". In spring 1998, Rouse sold its interest in the mall to its financial partner, Cigna. Cigna in turn hired General Growth Properties' subsidiary, General Growth Management Inc. (GGMI) to manage the mall. In the same year, anchor store Lazarus (formerly Rike's) left the mall, and later that year JCPenney also closed. The Loews Cinema and many of the mall's restaurants also went out of business, leaving Sears and a newly built Home Depot (in a separate building) as the only anchors. The mall closed permanently in early 2005.

Demolition of the mall began on May 15, 2006, but the Sears building was retained, with Sears becoming a standalone store. The city of Trotwood purchased the mall site, with the exception of Sears and Home Depot, in 2004, and began working with GGP to redevelop the area as the Landmark Town Center, an upscale, open-air, "lifestyle" complex, intended to resemble the Easton Town Center in Columbus. The new center suffered delays, with GGP leaving the project in 2007, and its completion date was repeatedly extended. By 2010/2011, Trotwood had reenvisioned the mall site as the TechConnection Business Park, a mixed-use technology campus. As of October 2013, no physical progress had been made on the business park. After an October 2013 announcement, Sears closed in January 2014, with no word on the fate of its former building.

In June 2018, Trotwood received a $200,0000 federal grant, which together with $200.000 of the city's own funds, will be used to demolish the Sears building and clean up the former mall site for future expected mixed-use development. The cleanup is expected to take at least a year. In 2019, the city became involved in a bidding war for the old Sears building, which was placed up for auction by a bankruptcy court. Having made an initial offer of $70,000, they were outbid by an investor, but ultimately purchased the property for $225,000 in the second round of bidding. In December 2021, it was reported that a group called the Trotwood Community Improvement Corporation was seeking public input on how to redesign the site, in conjunction with the University of Dayton. Plans include a community kitchen and market as well as a business hub.

In 2022, it was announced that an agreement had been reached with the city of Trotwood for 20,000 square feet of the Sears Center within the Salem Mall into the new home of the Funk Music Hall of Fame and Exhibition Center, nearly four years after the Funk Music Hall of Fame had closed its previous location. Neighboring Dayton is known as the home of many famous funk artists, including The Ohio Players and Shirley Murdock. Plans for the new Hall of Fame include an educational center, though the date of opening was yet to be determined at the time of announcement.

In November 2024, it was reported that Trotwood was seeking ideas from local entrepreneurs regarding uses for old Salem Mall space, including the site of the Sears Department store, with the goal of "transforming it into a one-stop shop for residents to explore local businesses" and "actively looking for businesses in the food and retail industries to become tenants, as well as businesses that provide after-school entertainment and education geared towards children." No mention was made at the time of the Funk Music Hall of Fame and Exhibition Center.

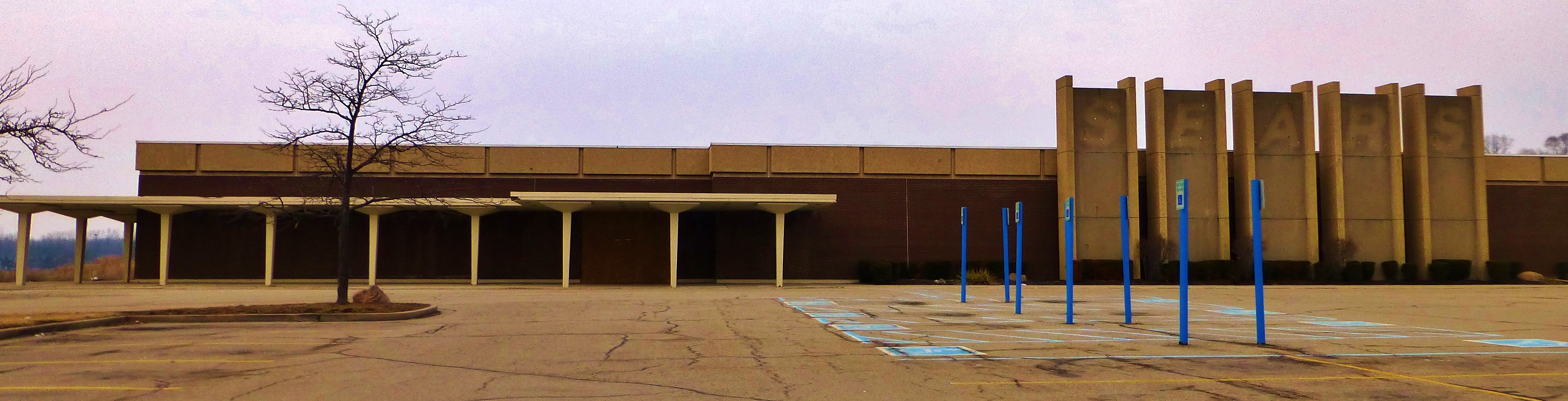
Former Sears department store, 2014
