= John Scudder Adkins =

American architect

- Born: September 20, 1872; St. Louis, Missouri
- Died: April 14, 1931 (aged 58); Cincinnati, Ohio
- Occupation: Architect

John Scudder Adkins (September 20, 1872 in St. Louis, Missouri – April 14, 1931 in Cincinnati, Ohio) was an American architect who specialized in Beaux Arts, Tudor, and Jacobethan styles in the first half of the 20th century.

A majority of his buildings are located in Indiana, Kentucky, and Ohio. Five of his projects are listed on the National Register of Historic Places.

== Education, training, and career ==
Partnering with some of the leading architects and firms of the area, he served as the designer for the projects, with his partners supervising the actual construction. He appears to have been equally comfortable designing large scale public buildings, such as churches and courthouses, as well as single family dwellings for wealthy clients.

Educated at Washington University's School of Fine Arts, John S. Adkins trained in St. Louis while working for George I. Barnett; Shepley, Rutan & Coolidge; and Peabody & Stearns. While at Peabody & Stearns, he likely helped with the design of buildings for the World's Columbian Exposition held in Chicago in 1893. After moving to Cincinnati in 1893, Adkins partnered with Samuel Hannaford & Sons, George S. Werner, Frank Mills Andrews, H. E. Kennedy, Christian Weber, Edward Weber, Matthew H. Burton, and Hugh M. Garriott. When partnering with other architects, Adkins typically did the design work himself while the partner supervised actual construction of the building.

“Adkins was a specialist in refined Beaux-Arts or Traditional design, based on a variety of historic styles, usually handled with authenticity, restraint, and craftsmanship of quietly high quality.” He had “an original manner of so designing a building that its location, material and design all blend into one complete and harmonious whole. In fact, the genius he displays in creating buildings that harmonize with their surroundings, the material of which they are constructed and the purpose for which they are intended, prove that he is an architect and not merely a draughtsman or a drawer of tasteful designs.”

While specializing in Beaux-Arts design, particularly for public building projects, Adkins designed residences for wealthy clients in various styles, notably Tudor-Revival and Jacobethan designs. Spending the majority of his career in the Cincinnati area, Adkins drew upon the skills of local craftsmen, such as the Cincinnati art carvers movement and Rookwood Pottery, as well as using the abundant local timber and limestone. This use of high-quality craftsmanship and local materials fit beautifully within Adkins' commissions, particularly the Tudor and Jacobethan buildings' emphasis on local materials and craftsmanship.

== Buildings on the National Register ==
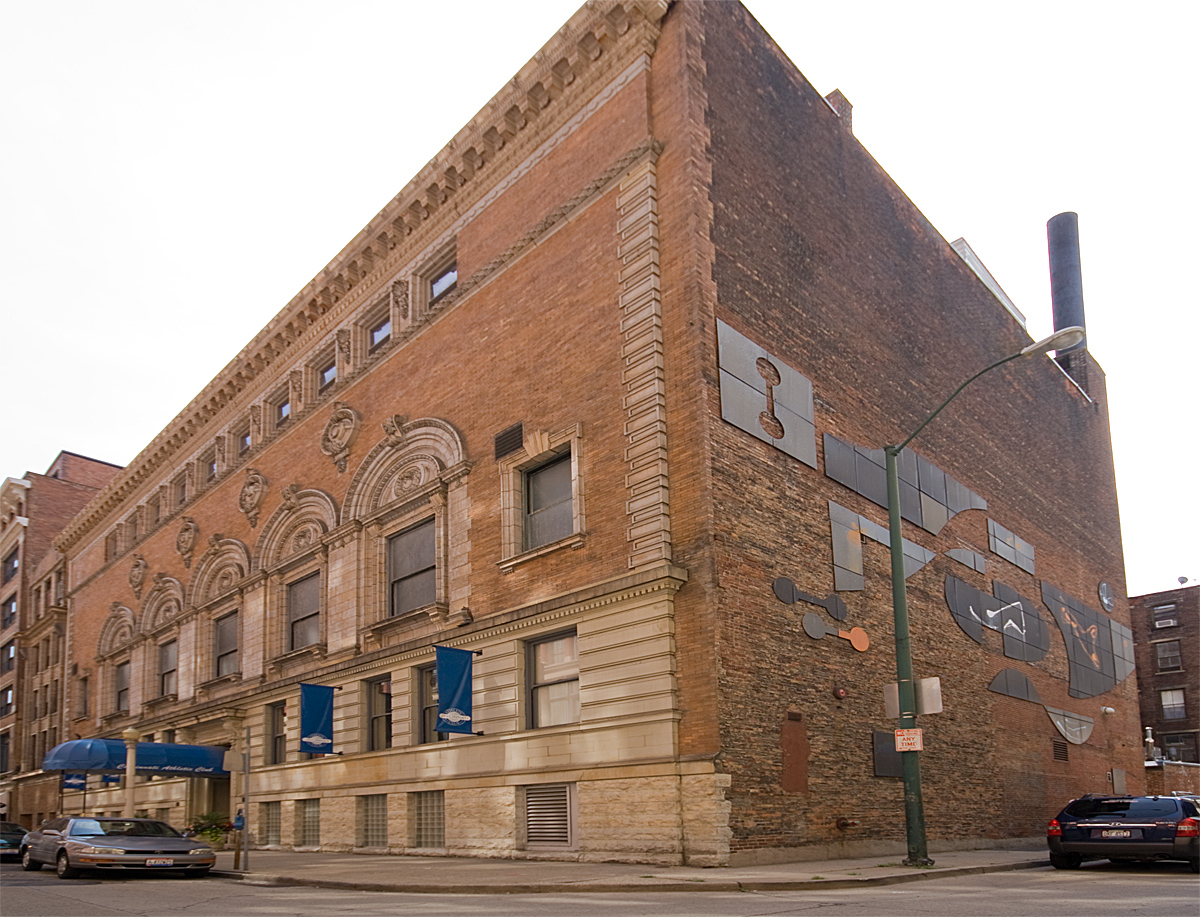
Cincinnati Athletic Club

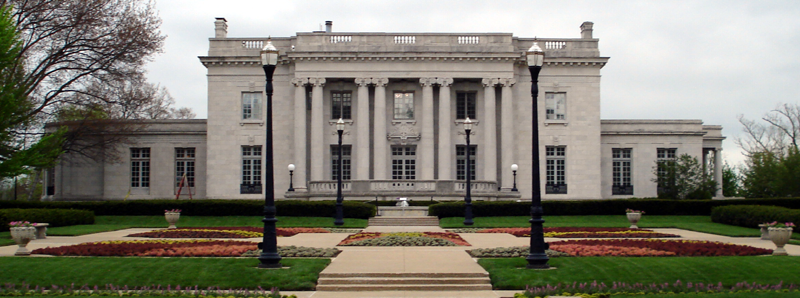
Kentucky Governor's Mansion

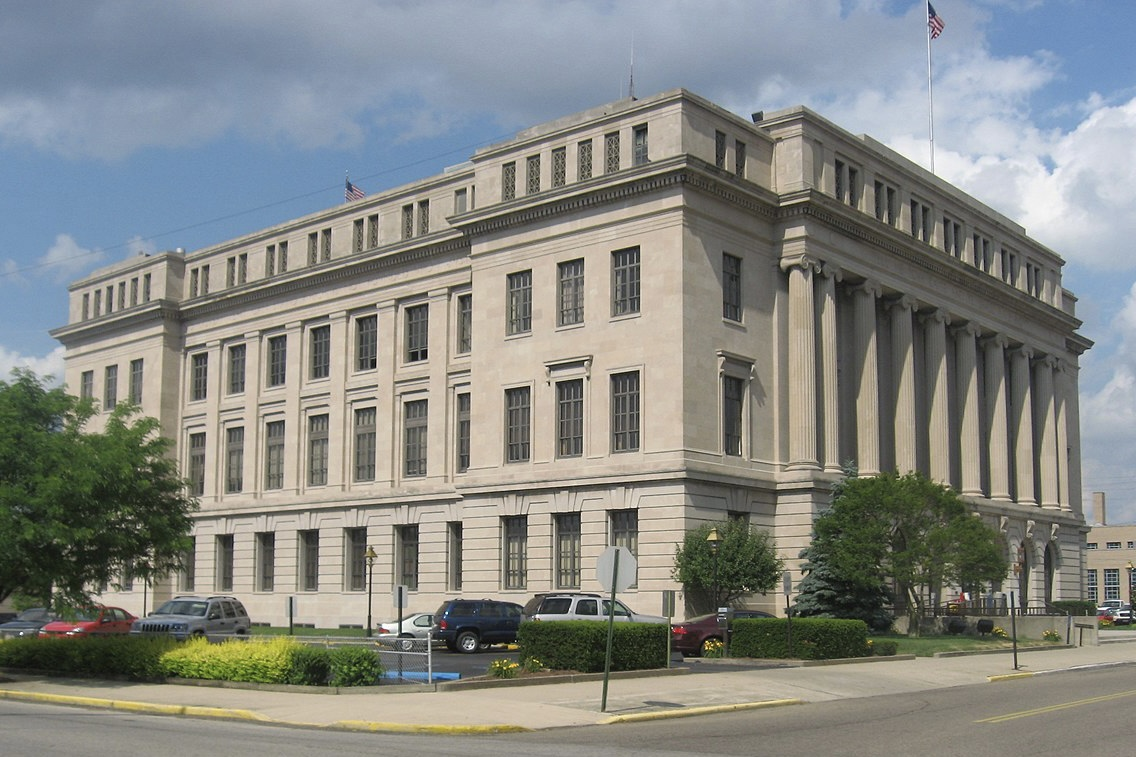
Scioto County Courthouse

- Cincinnati Gymnasium & Athletic Club, Cincinnati, Ohio
- Kentucky Governor's Mansion, Frankfort, Kentucky
- Lillybanks residence, Cincinnati, Ohio
- City Hall and Municipal Building, Norwood, Ohio
- Scioto County Courthouse, Portsmouth, Ohio

== Other buildings ==
- Audubon Building, Canal and Burgundy Streets, New Orleans, Louisiana.
- Cincinnati Public Library, Norwood Branch, 4325 Montgomery Road, Norwood, Ohio
- Grace Episcopal Church, 5501 Hamilton Avenue, Cincinnati, Ohio
- Charles Atkins residence, 4008 Rose Hill Avenue, Cincinnati, Ohio
- First National and Norwood National Banks, Norwood, Ohio
- Brighton German Bank, Colerain and Harrison Avenues, Cincinnati, Ohio
- First Baptist Church, Lexington, Kentucky.
- Kanawha National Bank, Charleston, West Virginia
- Clinton County Ohio Courthouse, 53 East Main Street, Wilmington, Ohio
- The General Denver Hotel, 81 West Main Street, Wilmington, Ohio
- Maplewood, William Ball residence, Muncie, Indiana,
- Nurses’ Residence Hall, Ball State University, Muncie, Indiana
- Colonel Alvin Owsley residence, Dallas, Texas
- Second National Bank Building, 830 Main Street, Cincinnati, Ohio
- First Baptist Church, 548 West Short Street, Lexington, Kentucky
