= Florence Mall (Kentucky) =

Indoor shopping mall in Florence, Kentucky

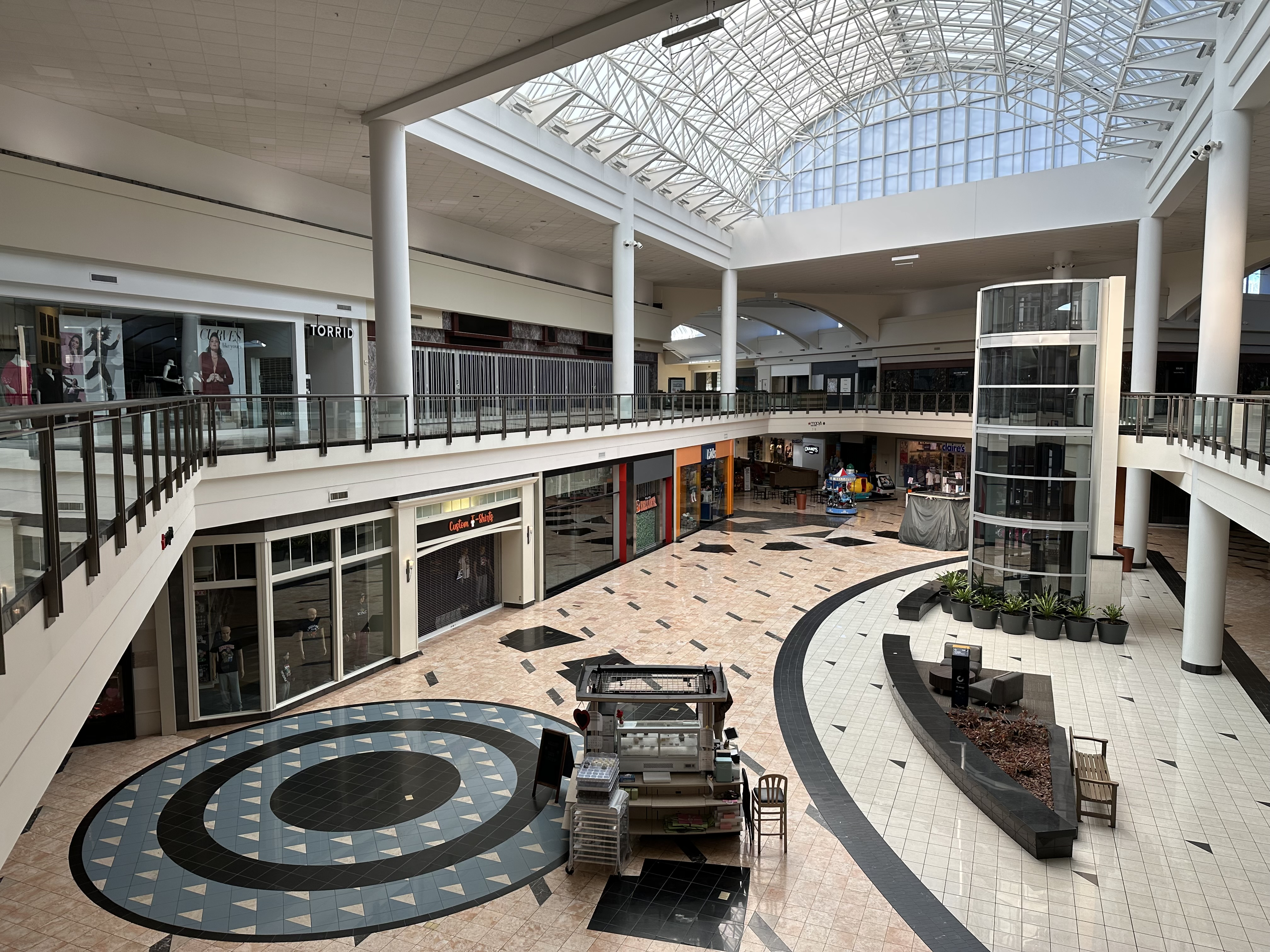
- Center court of Florence Mall
- Location: Florence, Kentucky
- Coordinates: 38°59′44.97″N 84°39′0.51″W
- Address: 2028 Florence Mall; Florence, Kentucky 41042
- Opened: 1976; 50 years ago
- Developer: Homart Development Company
- Manager: Namdar Realty Group
- Owner: Mason Asset Management and Namdar Realty Group
- Architect: Hixson, Inc.
- Num. of stores: 101
- Num. of anchor tenants: 4 (3 open, 1 vacant)
- Floor area: 963,727 sq ft (89,533 m^{2})
- Floors: 2
- Public transit: TANK
- Website: florencemall.com

Florence Mall is an indoor shopping mall in Florence, Kentucky, United States. Built in 1976 by Homart Development Company, the mall originally featured Sears, Shillito's, Pogue's, and JCPenney as its four anchor stores. The mall features over 100 stores and a food court. Another notable feature of the mall is the Florence Y'all Water Tower on the mall property; this water tower originally bore the mall's name, but was altered prior to the mall's opening. The mall's anchor stores are JCPenney and two locations of Macy's, with the former location of Sears being vacant. Florence Mall is owned and managed by Namdar Realty Group.

== History ==
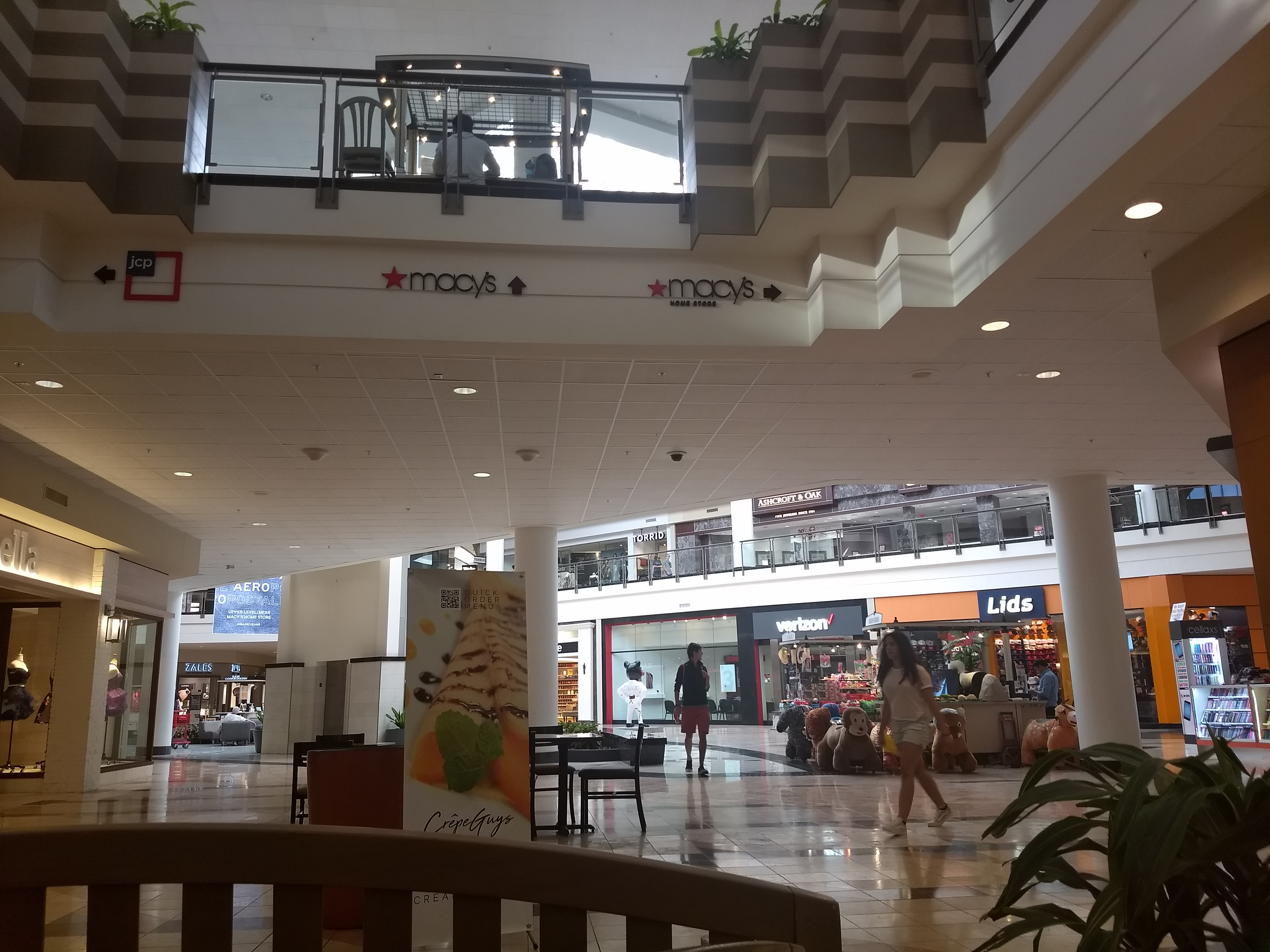
The Macy's wing of Florence Mall in 2019

Florence Mall opened in 1976 on a site along Interstate 75 just south of Kentucky Route 18. The two-story mall was constructed by Homart Development Company, the real estate division of Sears. Hixson, Inc. of Cincinnati was the architect and Charles V. Maescher & Co. also of Cincinnati was general contractor. Sears also served as one of the anchor stores, opening on March 10, 1976. The mall itself opened six months later, with Pogue's serving as the second anchor. Two more anchors, Shillito's and JCPenney, were added in 1977 and 1978, respectively. At the time of opening, the mall had 87 stores. The mall's opening led to the development of several retail stores in Florence, and as a result, the city became a retail hub for northern Kentucky.

While JCPenney has remained the same throughout the mall's history, the other three anchor stores changed as chains were acquired, merged or closed. The Shillito's chain was merged with Rike's and all former Shillito's and Rike's stores briefly carried the dual branding of Shillito-Rike's from 1982 until 1986, when the chain was merged into Lazarus. Pogue's was converted to L.S. Ayres in 1983, which in turn sold its store to Hess's five years later. Also in the mid-1980s, the food court was renovated.

Hess's closed in 1993, and one year later, Lazarus moved its home goods into the former Hess's space. During the 1990s, the mall underwent an $8 million renovation, including the addition of 64 new tenants.

In 2003, the mall was acquired by General Growth Properties in partnership with the Teachers' Retirement System of the State of Illinois. General Growth had managed the property for several years prior. Both Lazarus stores were converted to Lazarus-Macy's in 2003, then to just Macy's in 2005. The food court was renovated again in 2004.

On August 22, 2018, it was announced that Sears would be closing in November 2018.

Brookfield Properties sold the mall in 2021 with JLL managing the mall. On June 15, 2022, the mall was sold again to Mason Asset Management and Namdar Realty Group, with Mason overseeing leading efforts and Namdar managing the mall.

== Water tower ==
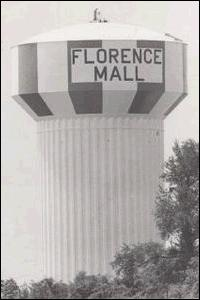
The water tower with the original wording

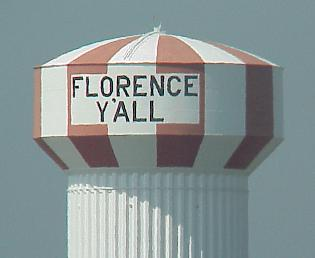
The water tower after repainting

Two years before the mall's opening, a water tower was built between the mall and Interstate 75 with "Florence Mall" painted in large letters on two opposite sides. But when the city was informed that this commercial advertisement was illegal as the mall did not yet exist, Florence's then-mayor C.M. "Hop" Ewing came up with the idea of changing the "M" in "Mall" to a "Y" and adding an apostrophe, changing the text to "Florence Y'all". The tower has since become a major landmark for the city.
