= Kona Ice =

Food franchise

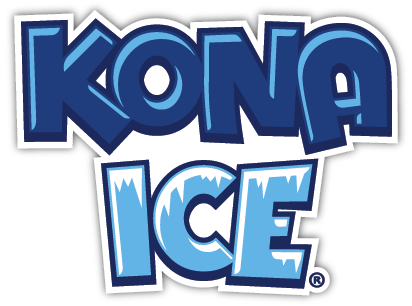

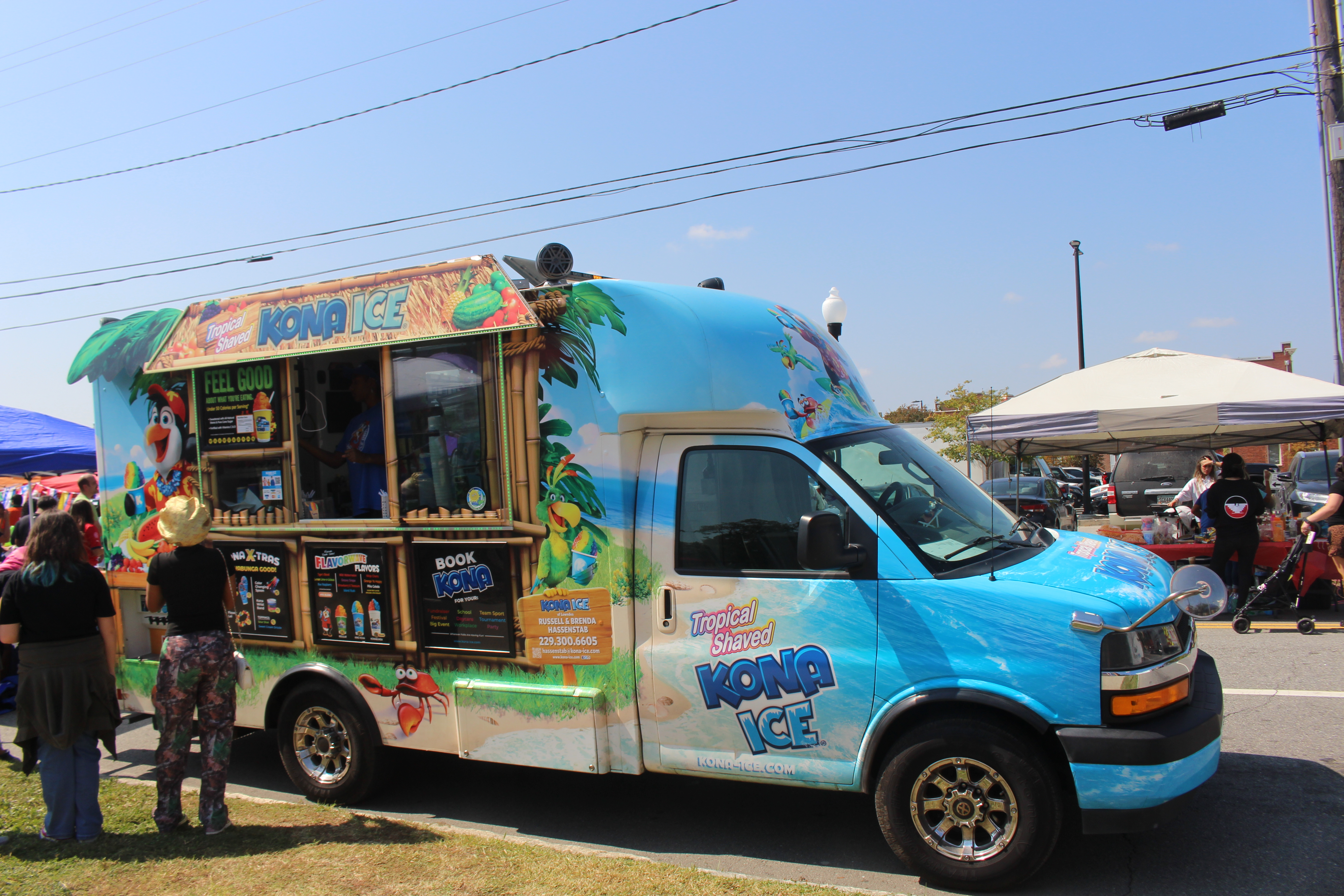
- Type: Private
- Founded: 2007; 19 years ago
- Founder: Tony Lamb
- Headquarters: Florence, Kentucky, US
- Key people: Tony Lamb (CEO)
- Website: kona-ice.com

Kona Ice is a privately held mobile shaved ice company. The company was founded by Tony Lamb in 2007. Lamb is Kona Ice's CEO. It was named one of the fastest growing franchises in the United States. The company's mascot is an animated penguin named Kona.

== History ==
In 2007, Tony Lamb founded Kona Ice after deciding that he wanted to build a better ice cream truck. By the end of the year, he had designed and produced five prototypes. Kona Ice began franchising in 2008. In October 2012, the company launched the Kona Mini, a smaller replica of the Kona Ice truck, to sell shaved ice indoors during winter months. Kona Ice was first recognized on Entrepreneur magazine's Franchise 500 list in 2013 and placed #31 overall in 2025. The company was also named the top new franchise and rated the 27th fastest growing franchise in the United States.

In 2014, Kona Ice partnered with Northern Kentucky University for an internship program. In May 2014, Kona Ice was named one of the top eight franchises in the United States by TheStreet.com. In April 2015, Kona Ice partnered with Make-A-Wish Foundation.

By the end of 2022, Kona Ice accelerated its growth, surpassing 1,400 trucks on the road across 49 states. By 2026, the brand had expanded to over 2,200 active mobile units with a presence across all 50 states. To date, Kona Ice has raised and given back over $200 million to schools and local organizations.

In July 2025, a Florida-based Kona Ice franchisee catered the Alligator Alcatraz Detention Center. The company apologized on social media in response to public backlash.

In 2026, the company engaged in brand partnerships with popular entertainment IPs, including DreamWorks Animation's Gabby's Dollhouse, to introduce a themed promotional flavor and limited edition cup.

== Sister Brands ==
Leveraging the infrastructure of Kona Ice, Tony Lamb began expanding the parent company into additional mobile food and beverage concepts. In 2020, Lamb founded Travelin' Tom's Coffee Truck, a mobile beverage franchise named in honor of his father, Tom Lamb. Travelin' Tom's began franchising in 2021 and experienced rapid multi-year growth, expanding to over 300 units nationwide by mid-2026. In June 2026, Entrepreneur magazine ranked Travelin' Tom's Coffee Truck as the number one emerging brand in the United States. In 2023, the company's mobile portfolio expanded to also include Beverly Ann's Cookie Truck.

== Operations ==
Kona Ice is headquartered in Florence, Kentucky. As of July 2025, the company had more than 2,200 franchise locations in 50 states and others across Canada. Kona Ice shaved ice offers sugar free and dye free options and contains 60 percent less sugar than regular sugar water snow cones.

In Summer 2025, Kona Ice expanded its product line to include Blended smoothies which contain three servings of fruit per serving.
