= Lillybanks =

Historic house in Ohio, United States

- U.S. National Register of Historic Places
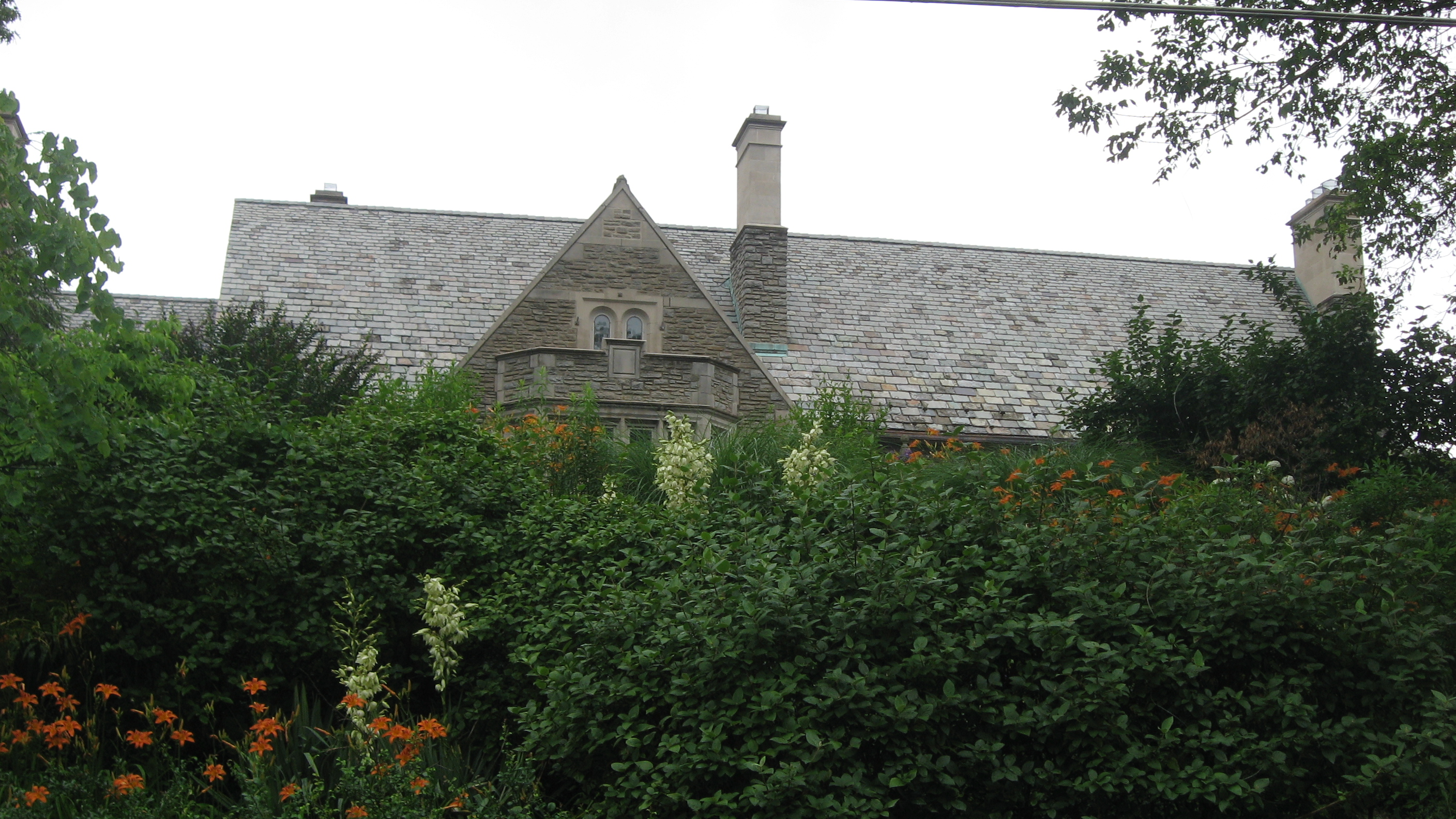
- Front of the house

- Location within Ohio Location within the United States
- Location: 2386 Grandin Rd., Cincinnati, Ohio
- Coordinates: 39°7′40″N 84°26′59″W
- Area: 1.4 acres (0.57 ha)
- Built: 1926
- Architect: John Scudder Adkins
- Architectural style: Tudor Revival
- NRHP reference No.: 83001982
- Added to NRHP: July 7, 1983

Lillybanks is a historic residence in eastern Cincinnati, Ohio, United States. Built in 1926, it is a stone building with a slate roof. Prepared by John Scudder Adkins, the design of the two-and-a-half-story house is heavily Tudor Revival — its location atop a hill and behind walls gives it the isolation common to Tudor Revival mansions. Moreover, the house's design features many elements common to the style, such as the gabled roof, ornamental stonework, wall dormers, and stone mullions in the windows. Its overall floor plan is that of a thin but long rectangle.

Lillybanks was the residence of Philip and Bessie Swing. Natives of Batavia in Clermont County, Ohio, the Swings were descended from leading lawyers of that community — Philip's father, Peter, was a son of Philip Bergen Swing, a judge for the United States District Court for the Southern District of Ohio, and Bessie's father Allen Cowan was a local judge — and Philip himself was a lawyer in the Hamilton County courts from 1894 until 1911.

In 1983, Lillybanks was listed on the National Register of Historic Places, qualifying for inclusion because of its historically significant architecture.
