= Clinton County Courthouse =

Clinton County Courthouse may refer to:

- Clinton County Courthouse (Illinois)
- Clinton County Courthouse (Indiana)
- Clinton County Courthouse (Iowa)
- Clinton County Courthouse (Ohio)
- Clinton County Courthouse Complex in New York
