= Race Street Historic District =

Historic district in Ohio, United States

- U.S. National Register of Historic Places
- U.S. Historic district
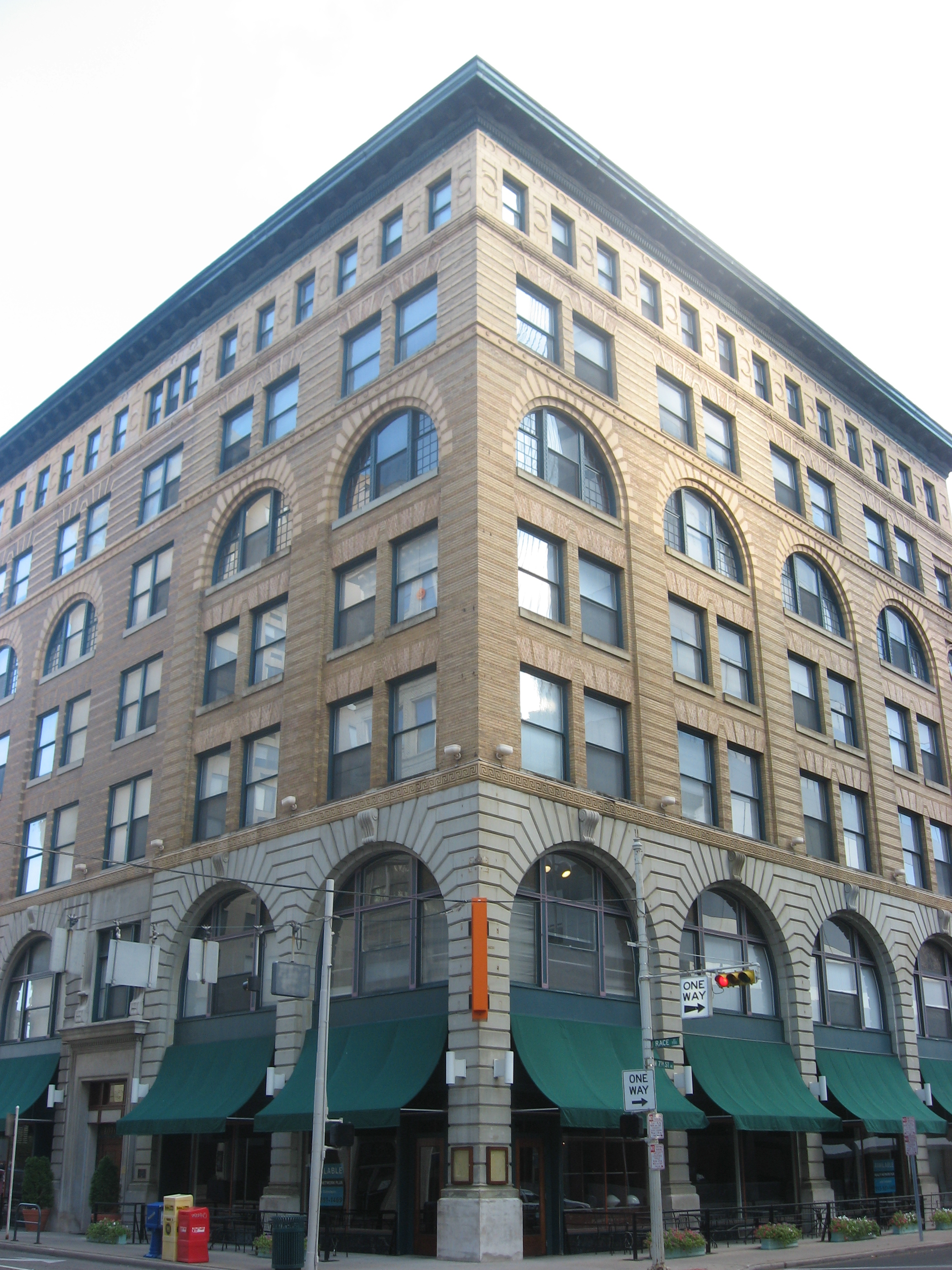
- One of the buildings in the district

- Location within Ohio Location within the United States
- Location: Roughly, along Race, W. 6th and W. 7th Sts. and Shillito Pl., Cincinnati, Ohio
- Coordinates: 39°6′11″N 84°30′54″W
- Area: 30 acres (120,000 m^{2})
- Built: 1926
- Architect: Elzner & Anderson; et al.
- Architectural style: Mid 19th Century Revival, Late Victorian, Late 19th And 20th Century Revivals
- NRHP reference No.: 95000878
- Added to NRHP: August 04, 1995

Race Street Historic District is a registered historic district in Cincinnati, Ohio, listed in the National Register of Historic Places on August 4, 1995. It contains 24 contributing buildings.

A notable building in this historic district is the former John Shillito Company department store. It has been converted into luxury apartments and businesses. A significant feature of the building is the restoration of the skylit atrium that was part of the original building designed by Samuel Hannaford.

== Historic uses ==
- Business
- Professional
- Specialty Store
- Department Store
- Sport Facility
