= Florence Y'all Water Tower =

Water tower in Florence, Kentucky, United States

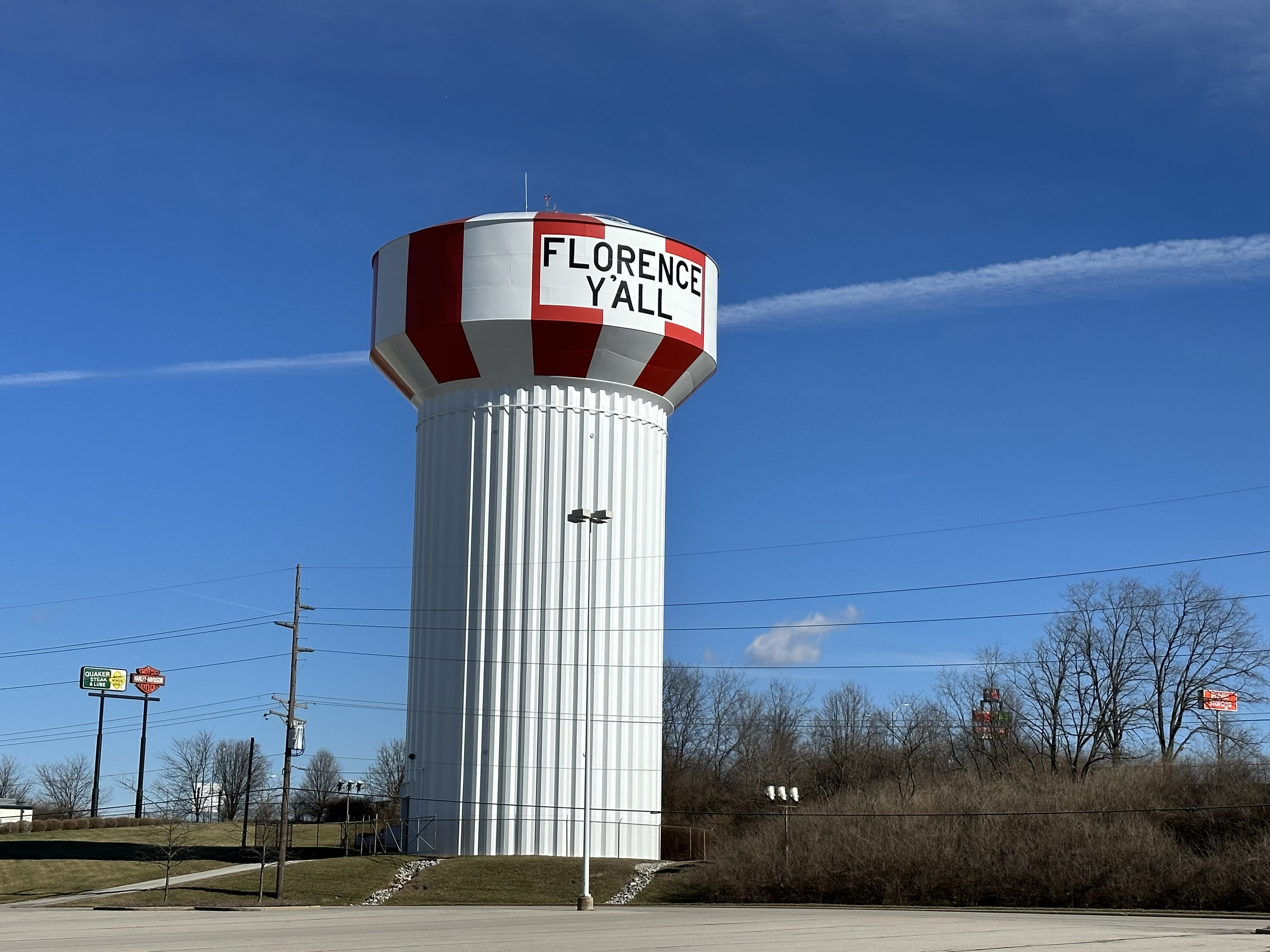
- The tower in 2023
- Interactive map of the Florence Y'all Water Tower area

General information
- Type: Water tower
- Location: Florence Mall, Florence, Kentucky, U.S.
- Coordinates: 38°59′51.6″N 84°38′51.8″W
- Year built: 1974
- Owner: City of Florence

Dimensions
- Other dimensions: Capacity: 1,000,000 US gallons (3,800,000 L)

Design and construction
- Main contractor: Pittsburgh-Des Moines Steel Co.

The Florence Y'all Water Tower is a water tower owned by the city of Florence, Kentucky, United States. It stands between the Florence Mall and Interstate 75/Interstate 71, where it is seen by millions of interstate motorists annually. The tower, built in 1974 and initially painted with the words FLORENCE MALL in giant letters, became a regional landmark after the M was changed to Y' to address legal concerns.

The water tower, which can hold about 1 million US gallons (3,800 m^{3}), stands in Boone County in northern Kentucky, due south of Runway 18L/36R of Cincinnati/Northern Kentucky International Airport and between I-75/I-71 and Mall Circle Road, northeast of the mall.

== History ==
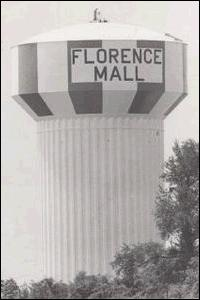
The Florence "Mall" Tower before the M was changed to Y-apostrophe

In the early 1970s, the developers of the yet-to-be-built mall gave the land for the tower to the city, stipulating that the words "Florence Mall" be painted on it in view of interstate motorists. The tower would thus advertise the mall, which would open in September 1976.

The tower was built by the Pittsburgh-Des Moines Steel Co. of Pittsburgh, Pennsylvania, and painted in 1974 by the Virginia Erection Co. The giant advertisement immediately raised legal concerns. In July 1974, state Bureau of Highways officials told the city that the tower's sign was illegal because it advertised something which did not yet exist.

Among the discussed possibilities were repainting the tower or covering the words with a large tarpaulin. With time running out to comply with the law, civil staff met for a brainstorming session at the Stringtown Restaurant with C.M. "Hop" Ewing, then mayor of Florence, who "sketched different ideas on a napkin". Ewing ultimately devised the idea of removing the vertical lines at the sides of the M in MALL, adding a stem to make it a Y and adding an apostrophe; resulting in "Y'all". Ewing called it a "corny solution, but cost-effective", because the minor alteration would cost one-third of a full repainting. The city paid $472 to the W.T. Marx Company of Cincinnati, Ohio, to make the changes.

The publicity surrounding the Florence Y'all tower advertised the mall better than a passive sign alone. On the mall's opening day in late 1976, mall-goers created a traffic jam at the Kentucky Route 18 exit from I-75.

=== Further developments ===
As a general rule, water towers are cleaned about every five years and repainted about every ten. The repaintings of the Florence tower have hidden the original patchwork modification. At some point, the red and white stripes on the tower were extended onto the top, where they converge in a spoke pattern easily visible from aircraft.

The tower's rewritten words have become a local motto of sorts. A town festival held around Labor Day was renamed the "Florence Y'all" fest. The words can be found on lapel pins, bumper stickers, mousepads, postcards, and T-shirts. A local miniature golf course, Florence's World of Golf, features a Florence Y'all replica. The "Soft Play" area in Florence Mall has its own replica tower.

The local independent-league baseball team renamed itself the Florence Y'alls in January 2020, but it had celebrated the tower even during its 16 seasons as the Florence Freedom. The team's mascot is a large inflatable "Y'all Star" mascot; the team has given away Florence Y'all water tower bobblehead dolls. When the Freedom hosted the Frontier League's annual all-star game in 2016, they marketed it as the "Y'All-Star Game", with the water tower in the official logo.

A windstorm in June 2026 caused an extended power outage that affected the water tower. During the outage, an overflow valve opened at the base of the tower to release water that could not be pumped into the tower. The overflow valve was closed after Florence's water supplier, Greater Cincinnati Water Works, adjusted the flow of water in its system. The tower was undamaged, and regular water service was maintained during the power outage.

== In media ==
=== Literature ===
The Florence Y'all Tower is mentioned by the narrator of the novel Ducks, Newburyport.
