= Duro Bag Manufacturing =

U.S. paper bag manufacturer

Duro Bag Mfg
- Type: Subsidiary
- Industry: Paper products
- Founded: 1953; 73 years ago in Covington, Kentucky, United States
- Founder: S. David Shor
- Products: Paper bags
- Parent: Novolex

Duro Bag Manufacturing is a paper bag manufacturer and a wholly owned subsidiary of Novolex (Previously Hilex Poly Co. LLC.), now owned by Apollo Global Management. Duro Bag Mfg produces paper bags for many companies in the United States. It was founded in Covington, Kentucky in 1953 by Mr. S. David Shor and was privately owned. Charles Shor, the son of S. David Shor, became president and chief executive officer in 1987 and ran the company until July 1, 2014. South Carolina-based Hilex Poly Co. LLC acquired Duro in July 2014. Prior to the company's sale, it was the largest paper bag manufacturer in the world.

Duro has purchased some of its larger competitors over the years. Duro Bag has over 1,800 employees working at 11 facilities across the United States, with the corporate office located in Northern Kentucky. The manufacturing sites are located in Alsip, Illinois, Brownsville, Texas, Covington, Kentucky, Elizabeth, New Jersey, Florence, Kentucky, Jackson, Tennessee, Richmond, Virginia, Río Bravo, Tamaulipas, Mexico, Tolleson, Arizona, and Walton, Kentucky along with art departments in Walton and Yulee, Florida.

Duro Bag is the only manufacturing facility at the Port of Brownsville that is non-maritime related.

Novolex sells the Dubl Life line of paper bags under the Duro brand.

== Novolex ==
Novolex owns the Duro Bag brand. For a number of years, Novolex was owned by the Carlyle Group. Before Novolex was sold to the Carlyle Group, it was majority owned by Wind Point Partners. TPG Growth (TPG Inc.) had minority ownership.

The Carlyle Group eventually sold its majority ownership of Novolex to Apollo Global Management.

Novolex announced the $6.7 billion purchase of Pactiv Evergreen on December 9, 2024. The deal is expected to close in mid 2025.

== Divisions ==
Duro Bag is a full-service bag manufacturer with two divisions: The Standard Products Division produces Grocery Bags; Grocery Sacks; Handle Bags; Merchandise Bags; Paper Lawn and Leaf Bags; and various Specialty Bags, including Lunch Bags, Pharmacy Bags, Liquor Bags, Freshness Paper Bread Bags, Food Service Bags, and more.

The Designer Division produces the broadest range of machine-made paper shopping bags in the industry. The variety of applications includes Retail, Resale, Restaurant/Food Service, and Medical/Pharmaceutical.

Duro also has in-house Art Departments in both Kentucky and Florida. Both departments have artists operating the latest Electronic Pre-Press Equipment. These artists assist in the development of customer artwork, print layouts, and marketing material. The Sales and Marketing Offices are located in Kentucky, with regional salespeople and an extensive broker network throughout the country.

Many of their employees, such as Brenda Nieves, also have their names stamped on the bottom of their bags.

== Sustainability and green initiatives ==
Duro Bag is committed to sustainability and was the first paper bag manufacturer in North America that produced a paper bag made from 100% Post-consumer Recycled fiber paper.

Duro Bag has a half-century history of reducing and re-using waste at its manufacturing operations by recycling 100% of the Kraft and Bleached paper waste from the production process. The company also incorporate high levels of pre- and post-consumer waste fibers in its products. They also demonstrates a commitment to net reductions in greenhouse gas emissions and water usage and has obtained third-party certifications from the Forest Stewardship Council (FSC) and the Rainforest Alliance for its lines of 100% post consumer recycled bags produced from its plants in Florence Kentucky, Walton Kentucky, Tolleson Arizona and Alsip Illinois. Duro Bag is a member of the Sustainable Packaging Coalition, associate member of the American Forest & Paper Association, sponsor of Earth Share and a member of the Greater Cincinnati Earth Coalition.
