= Clinton County =

Clinton County may refer to:

- Counties named for George Clinton, first and third Governor of New York, and later the fourth Vice President of the United States:
  - Clinton County, New York
  - Clinton County, Ohio
- Counties named for DeWitt Clinton, seventh and ninth Governor of New York and nephew of George Clinton:
  - Clinton County, Illinois
  - Clinton County, Indiana
  - Clinton County, Iowa
  - Clinton County, Kentucky
  - Clinton County, Michigan
  - Clinton County, Missouri
  - Clinton County, Pennsylvania

== See also ==
- Clinton County Courthouse (disambiguation)
