= Charles Shor =

American businessman

Charles L. Shor
- Born: April 2, 1954 (age 71)
- Education: University of Michigan (1972-1976)
- Occupation: Businessman
- Known for: Duro Bag Manufacturing
- Parent: S. David Shor
- Website: www.charlesshor.com

Charles Shor is an American businessman and philanthropist from Cincinnati, Ohio. He served as the President and chief executive officer of the world's largest paper bag manufacturing company, Duro Bag Manufacturing from 1987 to 2014 before selling it to South Carolina-based Hilex Poly Co. LLC.

== Early life ==
Shor was born in Cincinnati, Ohio, on April 2, 1954. His father, S. David Shor had started the Covington, Kentucky–based paper bag manufacturing business, Duro Bag Manufacturing the year before Charles was born. At this point, the company had one location with only a handful of employees.

In 1976, Charles graduated from University of Michigan with a degree in economics. In 1977, Charles joined the family business where he worked alongside his father until the elder Shor's death in 1987, at which point Charles took over responsibilities as Duro Bag's chief executive officer.

== Epilepsy ==
Early in life, Shor had only experienced intermittent seizures. However, after a kidnapping attempt and being promoted to president of Duro, Shor began to have seizures frequently. Shortly after, he was diagnosed with epilepsy.

Charles' epilepsy eventually inspired him to start the Charles L. Shor Foundation for Epilepsy Research.

== Career ==
After graduating from the University of Michigan in 1976, Charles joined his family business as a salesman in 1977. After four years with the company, Charles' father named him president of Duro Bag at the age of 27.

After his father's death in 1987, 33-year old Shor took the helm at Duro Bag where he was instantly faced with various challenges. In addition to his epilepsy, as well as increased competition from the plastic industry, Duro Bag's lender had also threatened to call the company's loans. However, then-local Fifth Third Bank eventually agreed to take on Duro's debt.

Fifth Third Banks's assistance gave Duro Bag the time it needed in order to realign its business strategy, ultimately resulting in Duro Bag's becoming the largest paper bag manufacturing company in the world. During Shor's tenure as chief executive officer and majority owner, Duro Bag made several innovations in the realm of paper bags, including; the first grocery bag made from 100% recycled material, the first tear-proof shopping bag (made from DuPont's TyVek material), as well as the first specialty bags for retailers; Tiffany's and Hallmark. Duro Bag purchased 17 competing paper bag companies on its path to becoming the biggest paper bag company in the world.

As a result of Duro's innovations in paper bags, the company found itself on the list of The Cincinnati Enquirer's top 100 private companies. Starting in 1988, Duro Bag moved from 7th to 5th to 4th, where it remained a consistent top 10 until 2014.

In 2014, Charles Shor sold Duro Bag to Hilex Poly Co. LLC. for an undisclosed amount. The South Carolina-based paper bag firm bought Duro in an effort to augment its line of recycled products. On July 3, 2014, the formal relationship between Shor was effectively dissolved as the sale was finalized.

== Philanthropy ==
Prior to a kidnapping attempt at age 25, Shor had only ever experienced a handful of seizures. However, due to the harrowing event, his seizures became an almost daily occurrence. After being diagnosed with epilepsy, Shor continued in his career as chief executive officer of Duro Bag, and joined the medical community in its fight against the disorder.

In 2002, Shor launched the Charles L Shor Foundation for Epilepsy Research. The foundation has made donations in excess of $1,000,000 to various organizations including University of Cincinnati, the Albert Einstein College of Medicine, and the Children's Hospital of Cincinnati and is one of the top private foundations in Ohio. Through the foundation, Charles Shor has also heavily contributed to several neurological studies aimed to better understand seizures and the effect of stress on the brain.

Though it is a major focus, Charles Shor's philanthropy is not solely reserved for epilepsy. In addition to his support for epilepsy research, Charles Shor, and the Charles L. Shor Foundation (not to be confused with the Charles L. Shor Foundation for Epilepsy Research) have consistently made contributions to Northern Kentucky University, the Cincinnati Zoo, and more.

In 2017, Charles Shor was the founding donor of the "Charlie Shor Park" at Aleh Negev, a rehabilitation village for disabled children and adults located in southern Israel.
