= Bar Louie Restaurants =

American bar and restaurant chain

BLH Acquisition Co., LLC
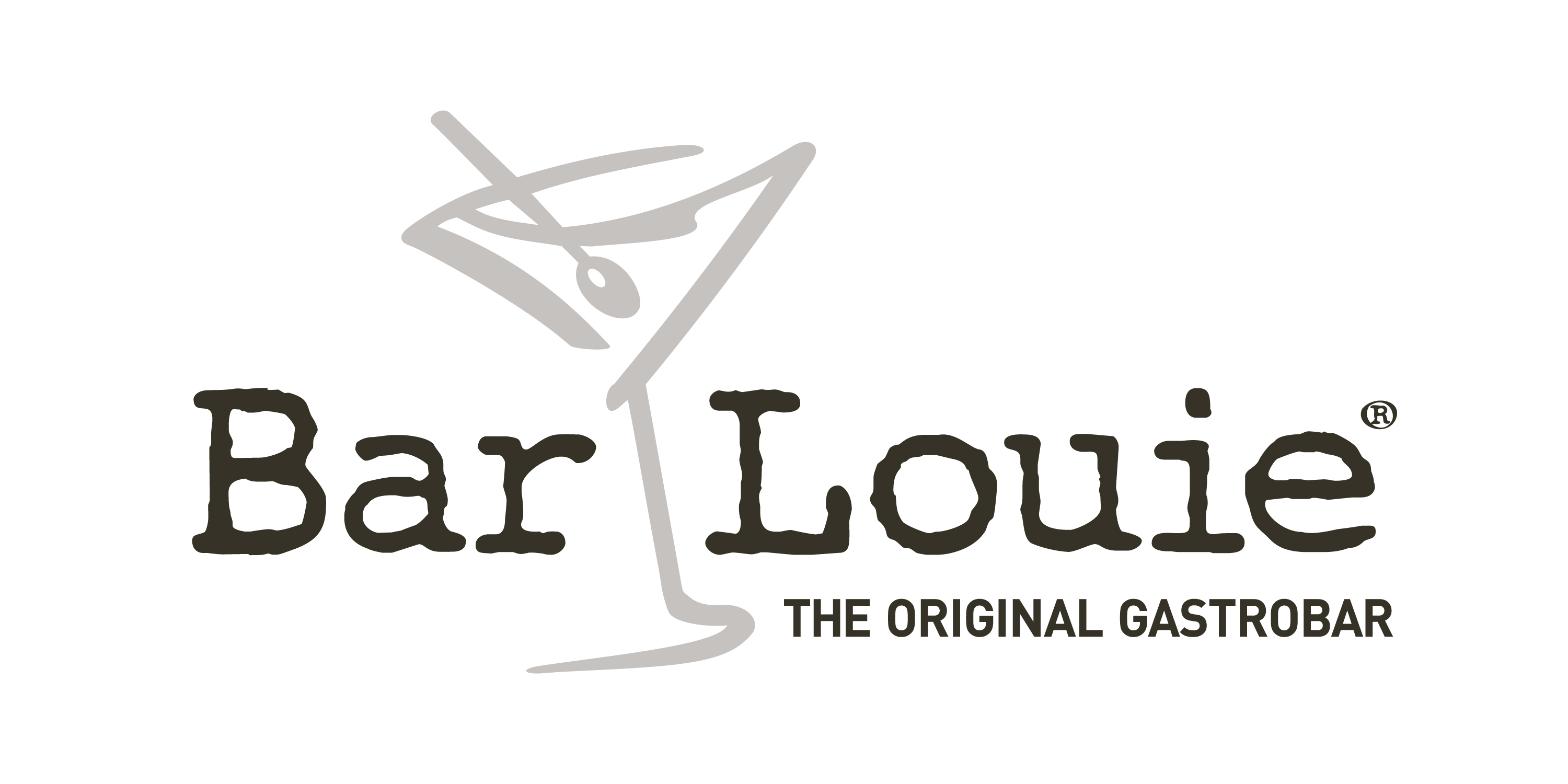
- Founded: 1990
- Headquarters: Addison, Texas, U.S.
- Number of locations: 73
- Key people: Brian Wright, CEO
- Website: barlouie.com

Bar Louie is an American bar and restaurant chain founded in 1990. Bar Louie serves food, beer, and cocktails, from locations predominantly located in urban and suburban markets. As of 2022 there are approximately 69 locations. Bar Louie is headquartered in Addison, Texas, and Tom Fricke is the company's chief executive officer. Sun Capital Partners is a major investor in the company dating back to June 2010.

On January 27, 2020, Bar Louie filed for bankruptcy and closed 38 locations. During the COVID-19 pandemic, Bar Louie closed an additional 22 locations. On March 26, 2025, Bar Louie once again filed for Chapter 11 bankruptcy, listing assets between $1 million to $10 million, and liabilities between $50 million to $100 million. The filing revealed that Bar Louie owes millions to many of its creditors, including US Foods Dallas, a subsidiary of US Foods. Bar Louie stated that their sales did not recover after the effects of the COVID-19 pandemic, and blamed its bankruptcy filing on operational and financial challenges. The company immediately shuttered 13 of its corporate owned locations as part of the filing.
