= Cincinnati Gymnasium and Athletic Club =

- U.S. National Register of Historic Places
- Cincinnati Local Historic Landmark
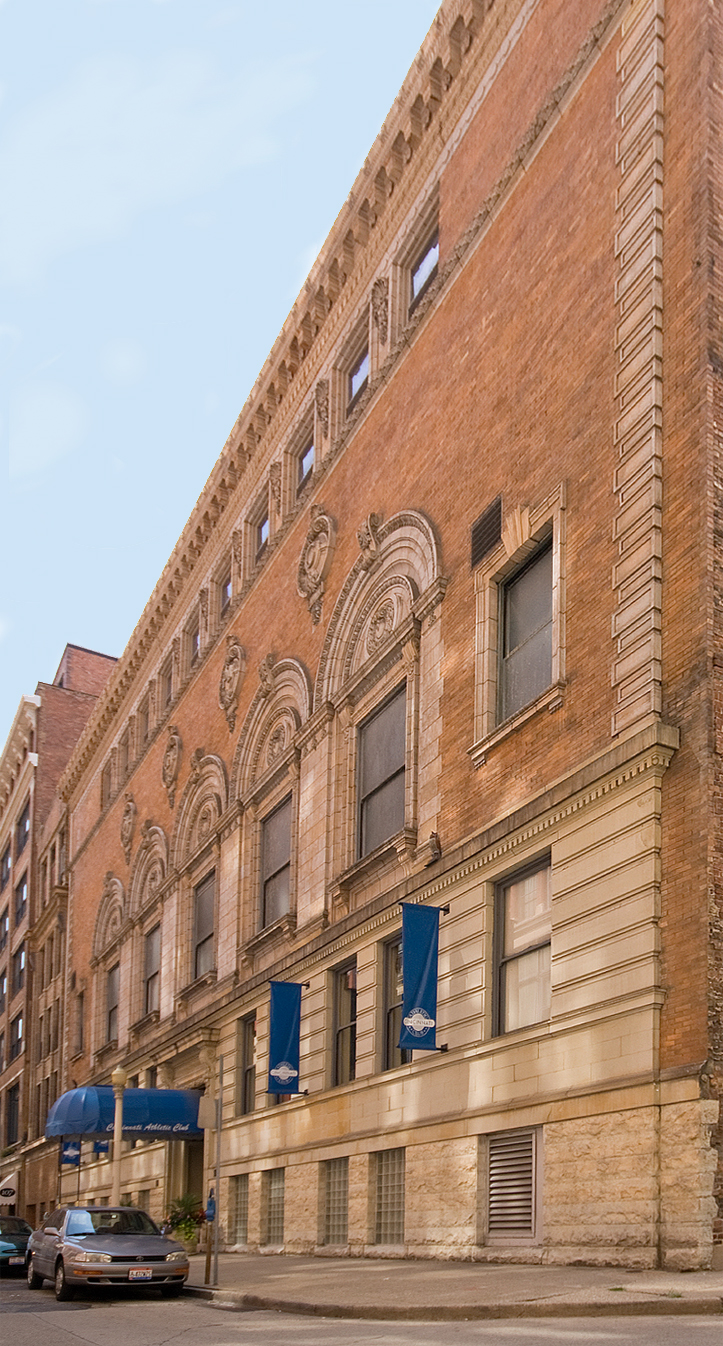
- Front and side of the building

- Location within Ohio Location within the United States
- Location: 111 Shillito Pl., Cincinnati, Ohio
- Coordinates: 39°6′9″N 84°30′55″W
- Area: 0.2 acres (0.081 ha)
- Built: 1902
- Architect: Warner & Atkins
- Architectural style: Late 19th and 20th Century Revivals, Second Renaissance Revival
- NRHP reference No.: 83001978
- Added to NRHP: February 17, 1983

The Cincinnati Gymnasium and Athletic Club is a historic building in Cincinnati, Ohio, United States. Located on Shillito Place in the city's downtown, it was built for a club of the same name. Founded in 1853 by a group of Cincinnati elites, including Rutherford B. Hayes, the society chose to erect a new headquarters in 1902; at the time of its completion, this four-story building was hailed as one of the country's best athletic facilities, second only to the gymnasium at Columbia University in New York City.

A Second Renaissance Revival building designed by John Scudder Adkins of the firm Werner and Adkins, the building is built of brick with stone and metal elements. Among these elements are rusticated stone courses, a molded balustrade, and trimmed windows. In recognition of its distinctive and historically significant architecture, the club building was listed on the National Register of Historic Places in 1983.
