= Florence, Kentucky =

- City
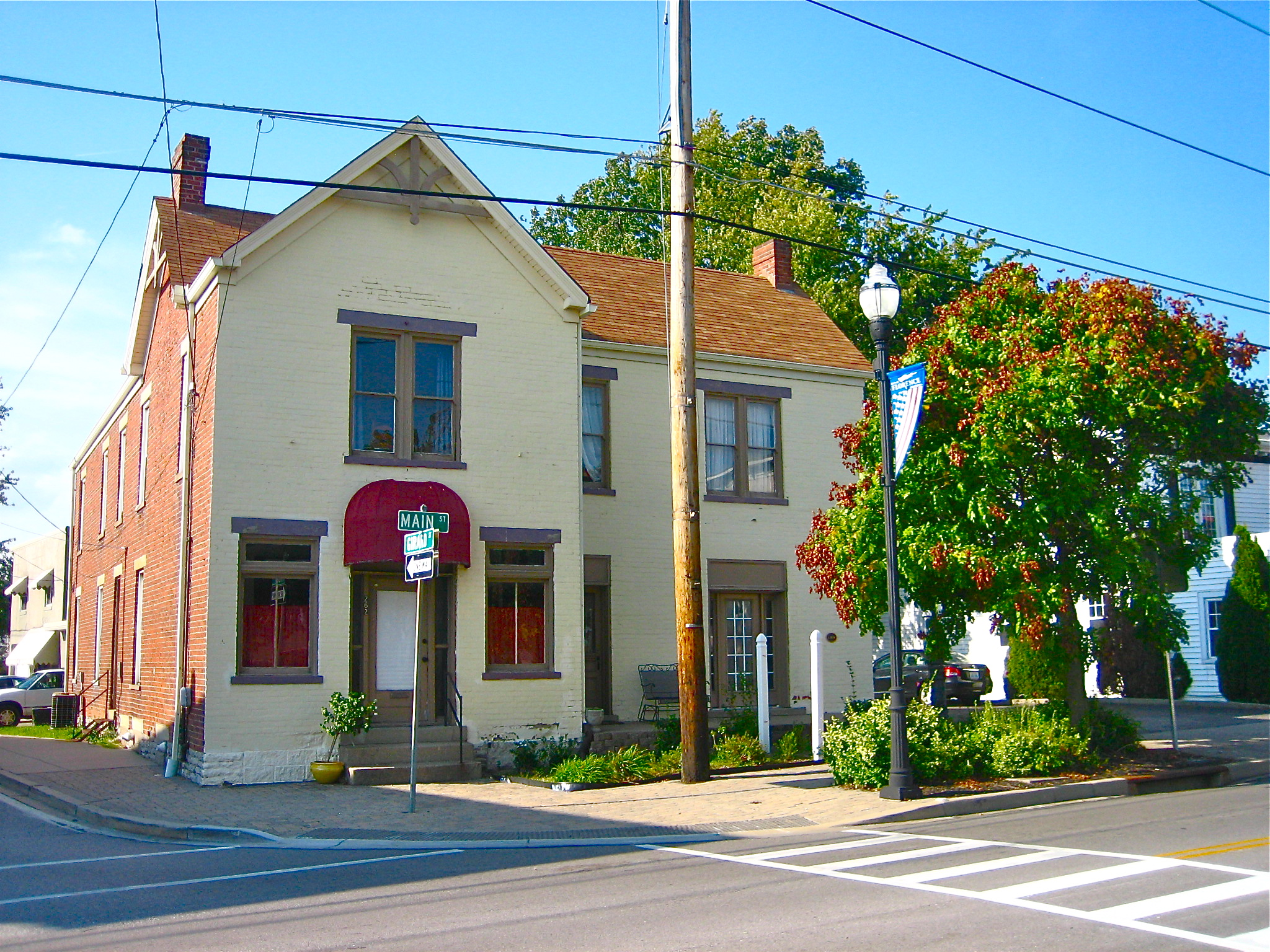
- Florence Hotel

- Flag Logo
- Interactive map of Florence, Kentucky
- Location within Kentucky Location within the United States
- Coordinates: 38°59′29″N 84°38′46″W
- Country: United States
- State: Kentucky
- County: Boone
- Established: 1830
- Incorporated: February 17, 1860

Government
  - Type: Mayor–council
  - Mayor: Julie Metzger Aubuchon

Area
  - Total: 10.73 sq mi (27.78 km^{2})
  - Land: 10.70 sq mi (27.72 km^{2})
  - Water: 0.027 sq mi (0.07 km^{2})
- Elevation: 883 ft (269 m)

Population (2020)
  - Total: 31,946
  - Estimate (2025): 34,018
  - Density: 2,985.2/sq mi (1,152.58/km^{2})
- Time zone: UTC−5 (Eastern (EST))
  - Summer (DST): UTC−4 (EDT)
- ZIP codes: 41022, 41042
- Area code: 859
- FIPS code: 21-27982
- GNIS feature ID: 2403620
- Website: www.florence-ky.gov

Florence is a city in Boone County, Kentucky, United States, part of the Cincinnati metropolitan area. The population was 31,946 at the 2020 census, making it the second-most populous city in Northern Kentucky, the eighth-most populous city in Kentucky and the state's most populous that is not a county seat. Like all but the state's two most populous cities, Florence is a home rule-class city under Kentucky state law.

== History ==
The Florence area was originally known as Crossroads, because of the convergence of several roads from Burlington and Union at Ridge Road (now U.S. 25). By 1821, the area was known as Maddentown for Thomas Madden, a Covington attorney who owned a farm on the Burlington Pike. When Madden moved away, the area became known as Connersville in 1828 for Jacob Conner, a settler who assumed responsibility for the growing town. The town was finally renamed Florence because there was another Connersville in Harrison County. The name presumably is for Florence, Italy, but the specific etymology is unclear. It was incorporated on January 27, 1830, and grew quickly after the completion of the Covington-Lexington Turnpike in 1836. Florence was also known as Stringtown at some point earlier than 1900.

== Geography ==
Florence is located in eastern Boone County. U.S. Routes 25, 42, and 127 pass through the center of Florence, leading northeast in a concurrency 12 miles (19 km) to downtown Cincinnati. Interstates 75 and 71 pass through the western part of Florence, with access from exits 178 through 182.

According to the United States Census Bureau, the city has a total area of 10.3 square miles (26.8 km^{2}), of which 10.3 square miles (26.7 km^{2}) is land and 0.04 square miles (0.1 km^{2}), or 0.43%, is water.

== Demographics ==
Historical population
Census	Pop.	Note	%±
1830	62		—
1850	251		—
1870	374		—
1880	309		−17.4%
1900	258		—
1910	250		−3.1%
1920	268		7.2%
1930	450		67.9%
1940	776		72.4%
1950	1,325		70.7%
1960	5,837		340.5%
1970	11,661		99.8%
1980	15,586		33.7%
1990	18,624		19.5%
2000	23,551		26.5%
2010	29,951		27.2%
2020	31,946		6.7%
2025 (est.)	34,018		6.5%
U.S. Decennial Census

=== 2020 census ===
As of the 2020 census, Florence had a population of 31,946. The median age was 37.6 years. 23.0% of residents were under the age of 18 and 17.1% of residents were 65 years of age or older. For every 100 females there were 94.3 males, and for every 100 females age 18 and over there were 90.6 males age 18 and over.

100.0% of residents lived in urban areas, while 0.0% lived in rural areas.

There were 13,003 households in Florence, of which 29.8% had children under the age of 18 living in them. Of all households, 39.6% were married-couple households, 21.2% were households with a male householder and no spouse or partner present, and 31.2% were households with a female householder and no spouse or partner present. About 32.3% of all households were made up of individuals and 13.0% had someone living alone who was 65 years of age or older.

There were 13,624 housing units, of which 4.6% were vacant. The homeowner vacancy rate was 1.2% and the rental vacancy rate was 5.0%.

Racial composition as of the 2020 census
Race	Number	Percent
White	24,572	76.9%
Black or African American	2,636	8.3%
American Indian and Alaska Native	167	0.5%
Asian	880	2.8%
Native Hawaiian and Other Pacific Islander	81	0.3%
Some other race	1,312	4.1%
Two or more races	2,298	7.2%
Hispanic or Latino (of any race)	2,765	8.7%

=== 2000 census ===
As of the census of 2000, there were 23,551 people, 9,640 households, and 6,073 families residing in the city. The population density was 2,385.6 per square mile (921.1/km^{2}). There were 10,322 housing units at an average density of 1,045.6 per square mile (403.7/km^{2}).

There were 9,640 households, of which 32.1% had children under the age of 18 living with them, 46.2% were married couples living together, 12.8% had a female householder with no husband present, and 37.0% were non-families. 30.2% of all households were made up of individuals, and 11.1% had someone living alone who was 65 years of age or older. The average household size was 2.41 and the average family size was 3.03.

23.7% of the population was under the age of 18, 10.7% from 18 to 24, 33.0% from 25 to 44, 19.6% from 45 to 64, and 16.2% who were 65 years of age or older. The median age was 33 years. For every 100 females, there were 90.4 males. For every 100 females age 18 and over, there were 86.7 males.

The median income for a household in the city was $57,348, and the median income for a family was $52,160. Males had a median income of $36,677 versus $26,323 for females. The per capita income for the city was $31,588. About 8.1% of families and 8.5% of the population were below the poverty line, including 11.5% of those under age 18 and 14.0% of those age 65 or over.

== Economy ==
Major employers in Florence include St. Elizabeth Healthcare, Boone County Schools, Robert Bosch, SWECO, Meritor, Eagle Manufacturing, Walmart, Costco Wholesale, and the City of Florence. Major employers in unincorporated areas with Florence addresses include Celanese, Citigroup, Crane Composites, DRS, Duro Bag Mfg, Givaudan, Kellogg's, Mubea, RR Donnelley, Schwan's, Staples, and Taylor & Francis. Companies based in Florence include Kona Ice.

== Arts and culture ==
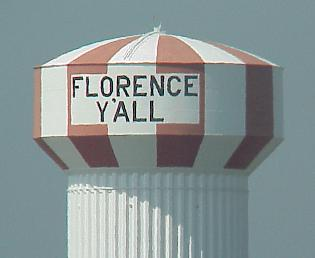
Florence Y'all Water Tower

Florence is well known in surrounding cities for a water tower visible from I-71/I-75 that reads "Florence Y'all". Built in 1974, the tower originally advertised the up-and-coming Florence Mall, as part of an agreement with the mall developers who donated the land for the tower. But because the mall was not built yet, the tower violated highway regulations, and the city was forced to change it within a short deadline. Rather than repaint the entire tower, they simply painted over the two vertical lines of the "M" to create a "Y", and then added an apostrophe. The intent was to change it back when the mall was built, but the local residents liked the tower's new proclamation, so the city decided to leave it as it was.

== Sports ==
The city is home to the Florence Y'alls independent minor league baseball team. The Y'alls have played at Thomas More Stadium in Florence since the venue's completion in 2004. Turfway Park, a horse racing track, is also located within the city limits.

== Education ==
Florence is served by Boone County Schools. Gateway Community and Technical College has a campus located south of town.

Florence has a public library, a branch of the Boone County Public Library.

== Notable people ==
- Shaun Alexander, former NFL player
- James Alex Fields Jr., perpetrator of the Charlottesville car attack
- Curtis Gates Lloyd, mycologist
- Akilah Hughes, American writer, comedian, YouTuber, podcaster, and actress
- Lexi Love, drag queen
- Kenny Price, country music singer
- Delano E. Williamson, Indiana Attorney General
