= Rike Kumler Co. =

Department store in Dayton, Ohio, U.S.

Rike-Kumler Company
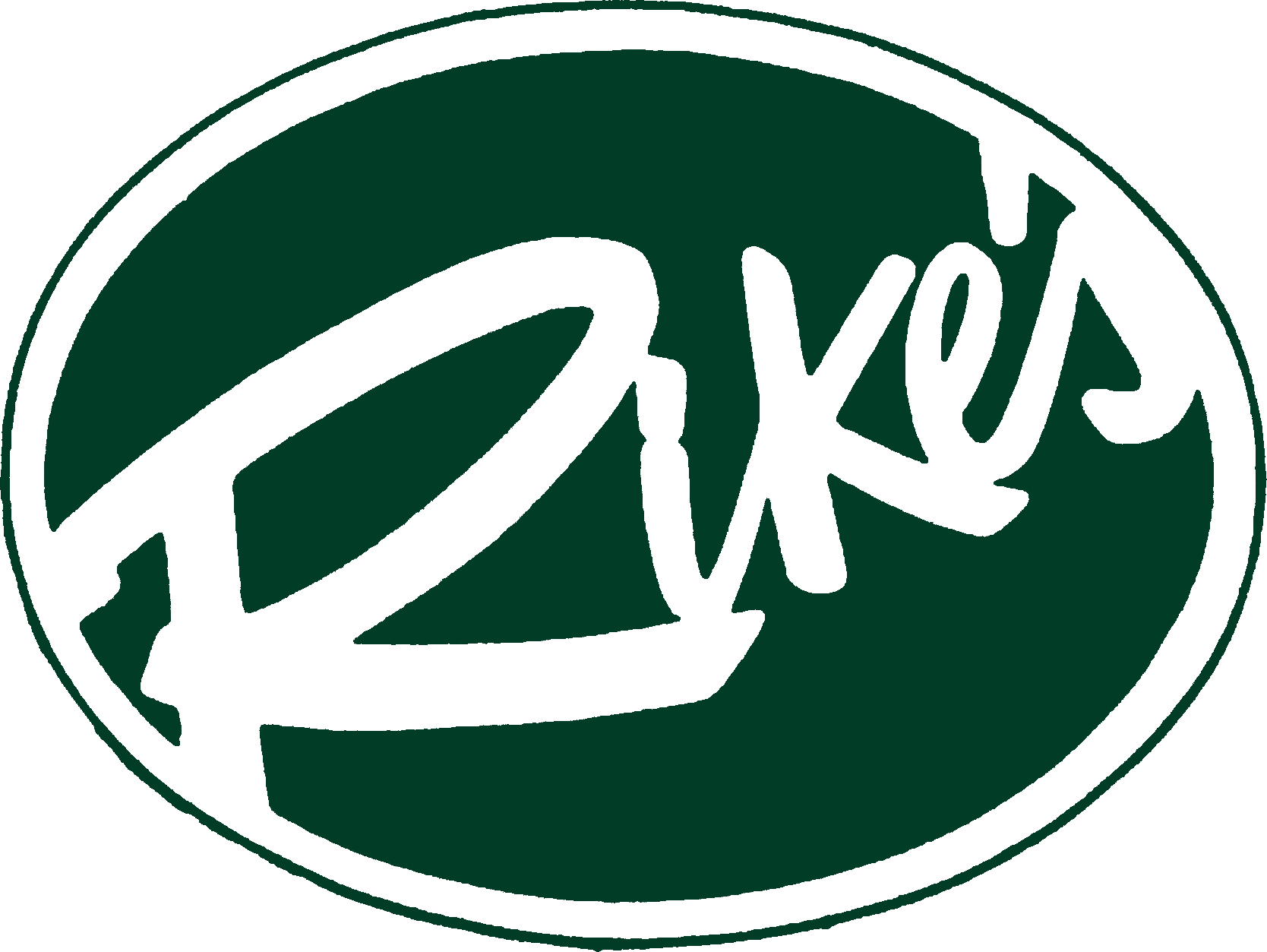
- Company type: Department store
- Industry: Retail
- Founded: March 9, 1853
- Defunct: 1982
- Fate: Merged with Shillito's
- Successor: Shillito Rikes (1982–1986); Lazarus (1986–2003); Lazarus-Macy's (2003–2005); Macy's (2005–present)
- Headquarters: Dayton, Ohio
- Products: Clothing, footwear, bedding, furniture, jewelry, beauty products, and housewares.
- Parent: Federated Department Stores, Inc.

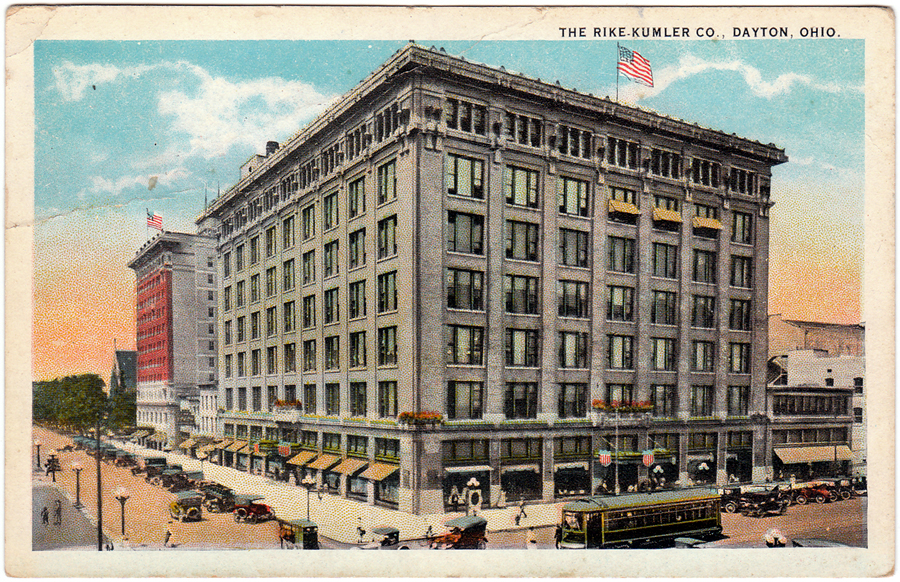
The Rike-Kumler Company on a Curt Teich postcard

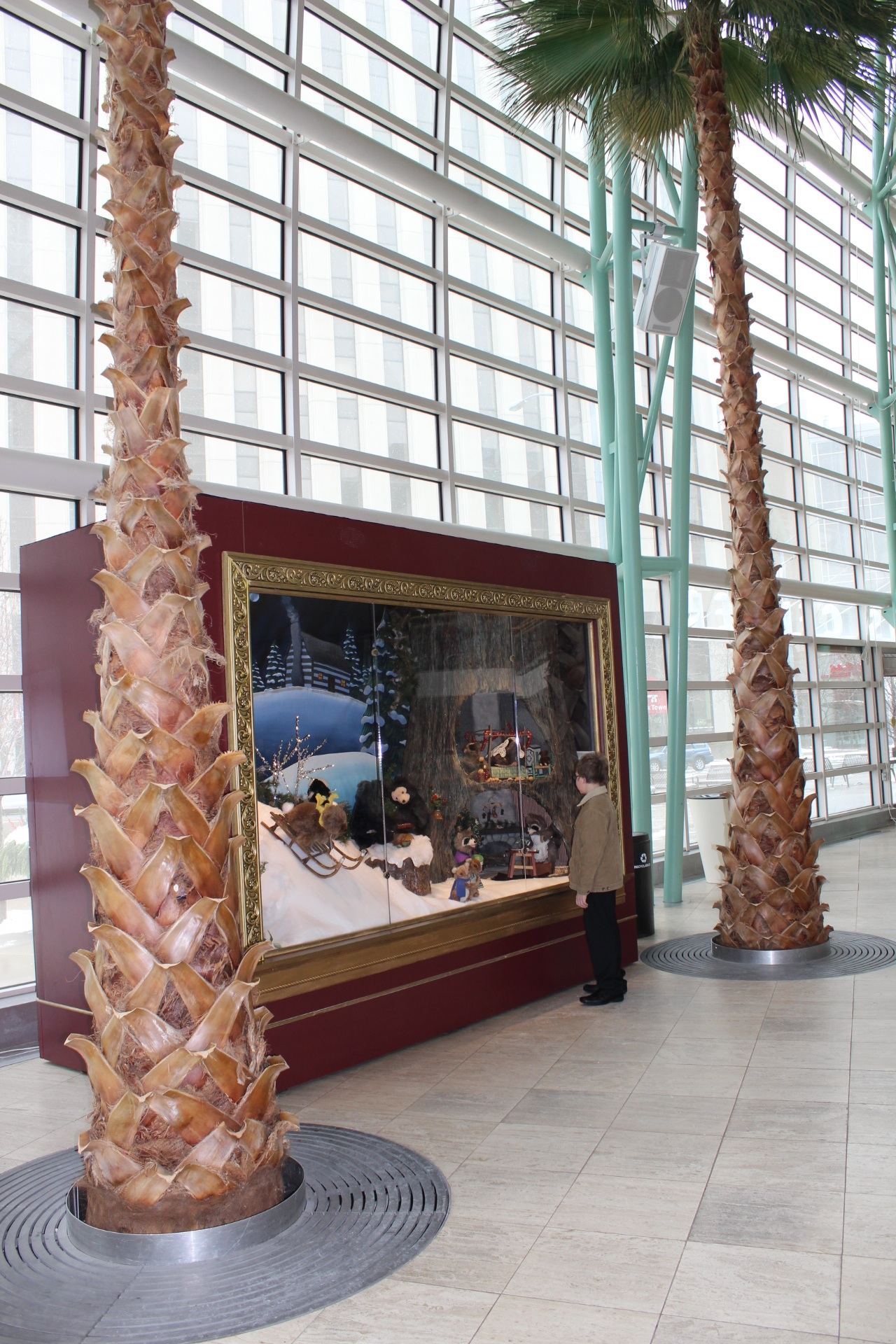
One of several restored Rike's department store animated Christmas window displays, on exhibit at the Fifth Third Bank “Wintergarden Wonderland” in the Benjamin and Marian Schuster Performing Arts Center (former site of Rike's main store), Dayton, Ohio, taken December 8, 2013

The Rike-Kumler Company (commonly known as Rike's) was an American department store in Dayton, Ohio. In 1959, Rike's became part of the Federated Department Stores conglomerate. In 1982, Federated merged Rike's with its Cincinnati unit, Shillito's, in order to form Shillito–Rike's. In 1986, Federated merged Shillito–Rike's into the Columbus-based Lazarus chain, which, in 2005 was consolidated with most other Federated chains under the Macy's brand.

Rike's former main store in downtown Dayton was imploded in 1999 and is now the site of the Benjamin and Marian Schuster Performing Arts Center.

Rike's was well known for its annual tradition of animated Christmas window displays. The animated figurines were preserved and have been displayed yearly during the Christmas season at the Benjamin and Marian Schuster Performing Arts Center since its inception.

== History ==
1853 – David L. Rike began his career with Prugh, Joice/Joyce & Rike Dry Goods at 17 E. Third St. In Dayton, Ohio

1865 – The store was renamed Prugh & Rike and is in the 300 block of Third St. in Dayton.

1867 – The dry-goods store is renamed 'The Rike Dry Goods Co.' as David Rike partners with Robert I. Cummins and Samuel E. Kumler (the Kumlers are his wife’s birth family) to form D. L. Rike and Company, operating as The Rike Dry Goods Co.. It remained on Third St.

1893 – A New building was erected on the SW corner of 4th and Main Sts. Dayton, and is modeled after a building seen at the Columbian Exposition’s White City. With white woodwork, arched windows, oriental rugs, chandeliers and a large staircase it was the most elegant dry goods store in town and established istelf as an elite store for the upper classes of the young city.

1895 – David L. Rike dies and Robert Cummins is named president. Rike's son, Frederick, assumes Vice President position.

1907 – Frederick becomes President of the company when Robert Cummins passes away.

1908 – The Rike Dry Goods Co., or Rike’s, becomes Rike-Kumler.

1912 – A new building opens at Second and Main Streets with seven floors and modern features never before seen in Dayton businesses. They have 500 employees that benefitted from the employee welfare movement championed by John H. Patterson, also of Dayton. The new store offers childcare and on site doctor for its employees, a pet department, appliances, and groceries while it contains two restaurants and a large employee dining room.

1913 – After the Great Flood, Frederick joins with John Patterson and other business owners to establish a city manager form of government in Dayton allowing corporation owners dominate power over citizen-elected leaders.

1923 – Thanksgiving Day, Rike’s kicks off the Christmas shopping season with a parade – one year before Macy’s in New York – ending at the store’s Toyland with characters in costume and Santa coming down through a chimney.

1942 – Rike’s suspends the parade because of the world war.

1943 – John Patterson's National Cash Register New York office windows installed animated Christmas displays called “Rike's Winterland Wonderland Windows”.

1945 – Frederick Rike brings these displays to his department store in Dayton, Ohio. Children lose their minds annually as families flock to the shopping district over these displays until 1991 when the store closed.

1947 - Frederick H. Rike dies and his son, David L. Rike takes over as head of the department store.

1959 – Rike’s joins Federated Department Stores, moving control of the store away from Dayton.

1963 – Rike’s is the focus of local civil rights demonstrations – led by the Dayton branch of the Congress Of Racial Equality – because of its hiring policies. Rike's, from its beginning would only hire white employees for public facing positions. Only a few behind the scene service workers would be non-white Daytonians.

1982 – Rike’s merges with Shillito’s to become Shillito-Rike’s. Local patrons understand this as the demise of Rike's even though the community was assured that it was not.

1986 – Shillito-Rike’s becomes Lazarus. After 133 years as Dayton’s elite department store, The Rike family name is no longer associated publicly with any store.

1999 – Unlike its namesake, Lazarus' department store did not revive after its passing and the building at the corner of Second and Main Streets for 88 years was taken down. The implosion was a major spectacle.

=== Rike-Kumler Co ===
The earliest company that included the Rike name was established in downtown Dayton, Ohio in 1853 when David L. Rike joined dry goods merchant Prugh & Joyce. The iterations of the Rike stores would remain independent until 1959 when they joined the Federated Department Stores company, at which time the Rike's company owned the 650,000 sq ft downtown store, a 280,000 sq ft service building, two warehouses, and the Miami Hotel. That same year, Arthur Beerman reportedly offered to sell his chain of Beerman stores to the company, but the offer was turned down by both the Rike-Kumler Co and its new parent, Federated. A branch store, the company's first, was announced as in the works in December 1960, and construction was underway by September 1961 for the new, self-service store in a newly built shopping center in Kettering, Ohio. The store would have a soft opening on October 30, 1961, followed by a grand opening on November 2, 1961, with a number of local mayors and county officials in attendance. The company would open its first mall store on August 22, 1963, at the Salem Mall in Trotwood, Ohio. The company's downtown store was subject of picketing and sit-ins by the Congress of Racial Equality beginning in summer 1963, over hiring discrimination at the store. The protest ended in October 1963, when CORE and the Rike-Kumler company reached an agreement, promising to hire more black workers, give them equal consideration in hiring, and making a pledge to bring on a number of black employees hired for the holiday season on as permanent employees.

==== Elder-Beerman Antitrust Lawsuit ====
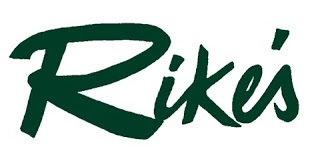
Classic logo

Beginning in 1961, the Rike-Kumler Co and parent company Federated Department Stores Inc, were subject to an antitrust lawsuit by competitor Beerman Stores, later Elder-Beerman, accusing the company of trying to smother competition in order to create a monopoly in the Dayton area. It alleged that the Rike-Kumler Co would tell suppliers not to sell to Elder-Beerman, or they would no longer buy from them, and due to their larger buying power, suppliers would choose Rike-Kumler. The second suit, claiming damages of $15 million (~$110 million in 2024), was filed in 1966. Elder-Beerman would be awarded damages of $1,275,097, later tripled to $3,750,291 in July 1969 by the U.S. District Court in Dayton. However, a three-judge federal appeals court would reverse the decision in April 1972, sending it back to the district court in Dayton. Rike's would leave the suit in November 1972, after reaching an undisclosed agreement out-of-court.

==== Expansion and Merger ====
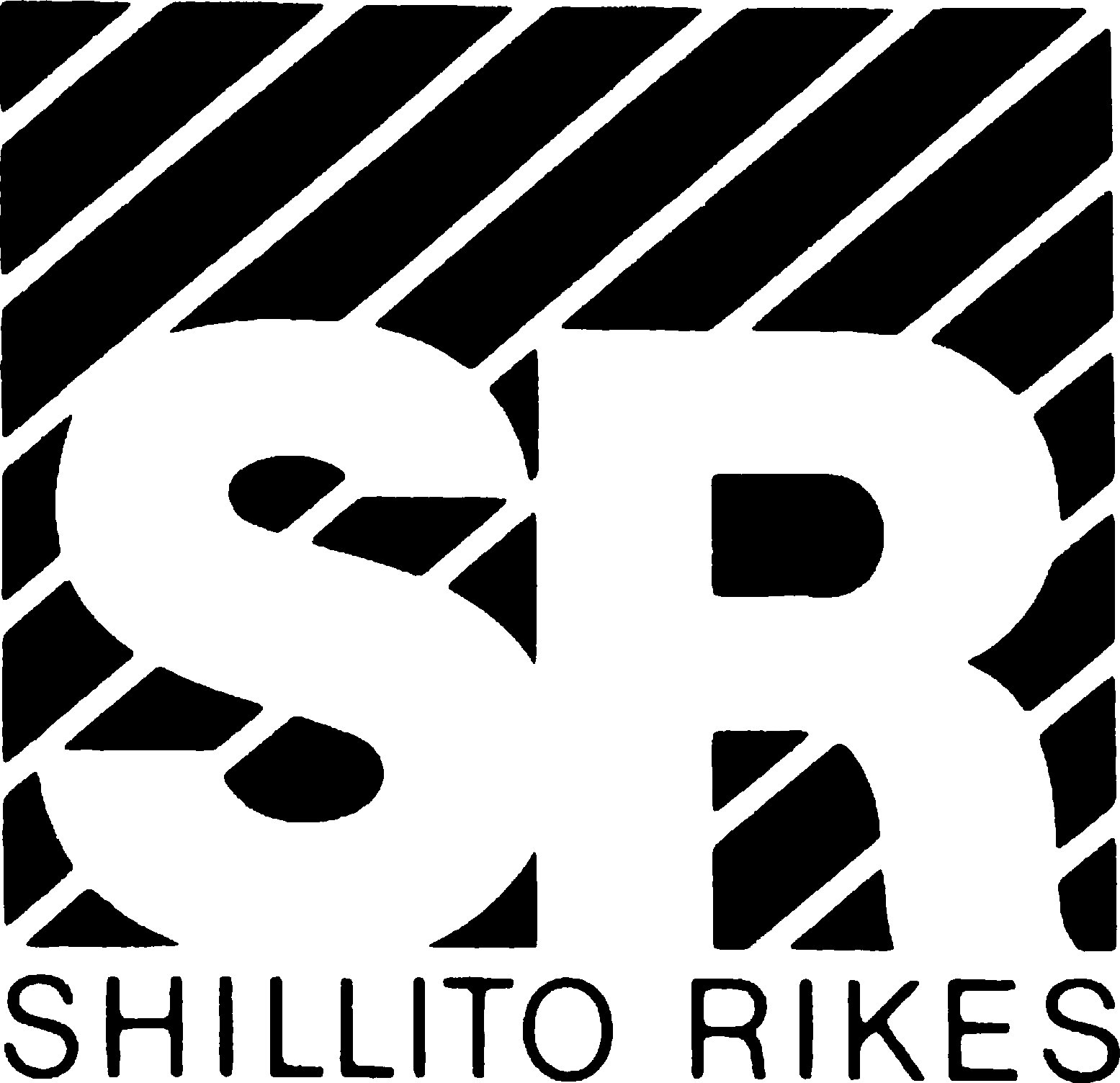
Shillito-Rikes logo

The company would continue to open mall-based stores in the early 1970s, including at the Upper Valley Mall and at the Dayton Mall. Another location at Castleton Square was planned, but later replaced with Lazarus, which was also owned by Federated Department Stores. The company would be merged for the first time in 1982, joining with Cincinnati, Ohio based Shillito's to form Shillito-Rike's. The merger was announced at a press conference in Middletown, Ohio, reportedly because it was equidistant to both Cincinnati and Dayton. At this time, Federated vice chairman Donald J. Stone said that the company would not be merged with the Lazarus department store operations, despite rumors. In spite of this, Shillito-Rike's would be merged with Lazarus only four years later, in early 1986, leading to the end of the Rike's name.

== See also ==
- List of department stores converted to Macy's
