= Clinton County Courthouse (Ohio) =

Local government building in the United States

- U.S. Historic district – Contributing property
- Location within Ohio Location within the United States
- Location: 46 S. South St.; Wilmington, Ohio
- Coordinates: 39°26′45″N 83°49′43″W
- Area: 24 acres (9.7 ha)
- Built: 1919
- Architect: Weber, Werner & Adkins
- Architectural style: Greek Revival
- Part of: Wilmington Commercial Historic District (ID82001363)
- Designated CP: October 14, 1982

The Clinton County Courthouse is located at 46 South South Street in Wilmington, Ohio. The courthouse is included in the Wilmington Commercial Historic District which was added to the National Register on 1982-10-14.

== History ==
Clinton County was established in 1810 with the county seat at Wilmington. The courts met in various locations around town until the courthouse was finished in 1813. The courthouse was undertaken in two phases. The first phase was the masonry, with the contract awarded to Jacob Hale and the second was the wood work awarded to Mr. Sayres from Lebanon. The structure consisted of red brick supported by a stone foundation. A pitched roof rested on a red brick cornice with two chimneys to either side and a central cupola.

By 1837 the county was faced with an expanding population and the need for a larger courthouse. Plans were sought by the county with the plans by John B. Posey, a County Commissioner, being selected. Bids began to be accepted for the construction with the masonry work awarded to John Bush, and the plastering contract going to Thomas & Alfred Shockley and William & Joshua Noble. The old courthouse was sold to aid in the construction costs

The new courthouse was completed in 1838 and was built in the Greek Revival style. The rectangular structure had a central entrance framed by four Doric columns supporting an unadorned pediment. This building would last until 1915 when Clinton County passed a resolution declaring a new courthouse was needed. During a competition, the design was awarded to plans submitted by the architectural firm of Weber, Werner & Adkins with a budget of $300,000 allotted to the project. The courthouse was dedicated in 1919 to much ceremony.

== Exterior ==
The courthouse somewhat resembles the old U.S. Capitol before the Civil War additions. The rusticated foundation is hidden behind a balustrade that wraps around the entire structure. The ground floor consists of smooth stone and arched windows, each with a decorative keystone. The entrances are accessed by a small recessed portico with three large arches. Above the entrances are four colossal Corinthian columns inside a recessed panel. Rectangular windows spread out on either side of this panel, lighting the various rooms within. An entablature supports the flat roof and a balustrade lines the roof. Instead of a typical dome, the building is crowned by a large dome containing a skylight illuminating the stained-glass window inside.
