= Bongani Mayosi =

South African researcher

Bongani Mayosi OMS
- Born: 28 January 1967; Mthatha, South Africa
- Died: 27 July 2018 (aged 51); Cape Town, South Africa
- Education: Nelson R Mandela School of Medicine, BMedSci, MB ChB; University of Cape Town; University of Oxford, DPhil; Harvard Business School, AMP
- Known for: Medical research; Professor of Medicine; Dean of the Faculty of Health Sciences
- Spouse: Nonhlanhla Khumalo
- Scientific career
- Fields: Medicine; Cardiology; Genetics
- Workplaces: University of Cape Town; Groote Schuur Hospital
- Thesis: Genetic determination of cardiovascular risk factors in families
- Doctoral advisor: Hugh Christian Watkins
- Doctoral students: Ntobeko Ntusi; Liesl Zühlke
- Website: health.uct.ac.za/mayosi-legacy

Bongani Mawethu Mayosi (28 January 1967 – 27 July 2018) was a South African professor of cardiology. He was the Dean of the Faculty of Health Sciences at the University of Cape Town and an A-rated National Research Foundation researcher. Prior to this, he was head of the Department of Medicine at the University of Cape Town and Groote Schuur Hospital. His research interests included rheumatic fever, tuberculous pericarditis and cardiomyopathy. He was a member of the Academy of Science of South Africa and a former President of the College of Physicians of South Africa and he headed numerous other biomedical organisations during his career.

== Early life and education ==
Mayosi was the second son of Nontle, a professional nurse, and George Timketson Sikhumbuzo Mayosi, an Obstetrician, and was born on 28 January 1967, in the small town of Nqamakwe. He attended primary school in Upper Ngculu village, Nqamakwe. He completed his secondary school at St. John's College in Umthatha. At the age of 15, he received the top marks in the Independent Transkei's matric exams. At the University of KwaZulu-Natal, he earned his first two degrees—a BMedSci in 1986 and an MB ChB the following year—both at the top of his class.

At Port Elizabeth's Livingstone Hospital, he served as an intern. The next year, he relocated to Cape Town to serve as a senior house officer. Afterwards, he began his rotation as a medical registrar at the University of Cape Town (UCT) and Groote Schuur Hospital and completed his training as a specialist. Following this, he was given the Oxford Nuffield Medical Scholarship, to study for a D.Phil in cardiovascular medicine at the University of Oxford while working with Prof. Hugh Watkins on a research focusing on cardiovascular genetics. After returning from Oxford, he finished his cardiology clinical training.

== Career ==
In 2006, he was chosen to lead the department of medicine at UCT. He was named dean of the UCT Faculty of Health Sciences in 2016 and served in that capacity until his death. In 2017 he was elected to the US National Academy of Medicine. Professor Mayosi published over 400 peer-reviewed academic articles individually and collectively, including collaborating with eminent researchers like Salim Yusuf. He was part of the team which discovered one of the gene mutations responsible for causing the life-threatening heart disease arrhythmogenic right ventricular dysplasia, this discovery was regarded as one of the most important medical advances in South Africa since the first human heart transplantation. He was an editorial board member for several journals.

Professor Mayosi served as the chairperson of the team appointed by the South African Minister of Health Aaron Motsoaledi to investigate irregularities and maladministration at The Health Professions Council of South Africa (HPCSA), the organisation which registers, regulates and guides health professionals. He was very involved in creating systems to train the next generation of physician-scientists; his vision included training 1,000 of them across South Africa every year. Mayosi raised over 250 million rands for research.

== Awards ==
Throughout his career, Mayosi received numerous awards. These included the Order of Mapungubwe in 2009, the highest honor given to South African citizens, the Platinum Award from the South African Medical Research Council, and the BHP Billiton Award from the National Science and Technology Foundation.

== Personal life ==
His father was a medical doctor and so was his wife.

== Death ==
Mayosi died by suicide on 27 July 2018; he had been experiencing depression for two years. Eight months before his death he had tendered his resignation to the University of Cape Town, however, it was apparently declined. According to his family the FeesMustFall protests contributed to Mayosi's declining mental health.

An exit strategy from his "very stressful" job was being planned apparently where Mayosi would instead head the South African Medical Research Council. The President of South Africa, Cyril Ramaphosa, conveyed his condolences on Mayosi's death and accorded him a provincial funeral. Among several dignitaries, Graca Machel, the Chancellor of UCT at the time, sent her condolences too.

Little was done to support Professor Bongani Mayosi, according to the findings of an independent inquiry panel set up to examine his tenure and death while at the University of Cape Town.

In 2023 his posthumous biography, Doctor of Hearts: The Biography of Bongani Mayosi, was written by Judy Dlamini and Kopano Matlwa.

== Selected publications ==
- Bongani M Mayosi; Lesley J Burgess; Anton F Doubell (2005). "Tuberculous pericarditis". Circulation. 112 (23): 3608–3616. doi:10.1161/circulationaha.105.543066. PMID 16330703. Wikidata Q33228602.
- Bongani M Mayosi; Lawn, Joy; Ashley van Niekerk; Bradshaw, Debbie; Abdool, Salim; Hoosen M Coovadia; Lancet South Africa team (2012). "Health in South Africa: changes and challenges since 2009". The Lancet. 380 (9858): 2029–2043. doi:10.1016/s0140-6736(12)61814-5. PMID 23201214. Wikidata Q42284339.
- Bongani Mayosi; Kate Robertson; Jimmy Volmink; et al. (2006). "The Drakensberg declaration on the control of rheumatic fever and rheumatic heart disease in Africa". South African Medical Journal. 96 (3 Pt 2): 246. PMID 16610104. Wikidata Q40481643.
