= Nina Teicholz =

American journalist (born 1965)

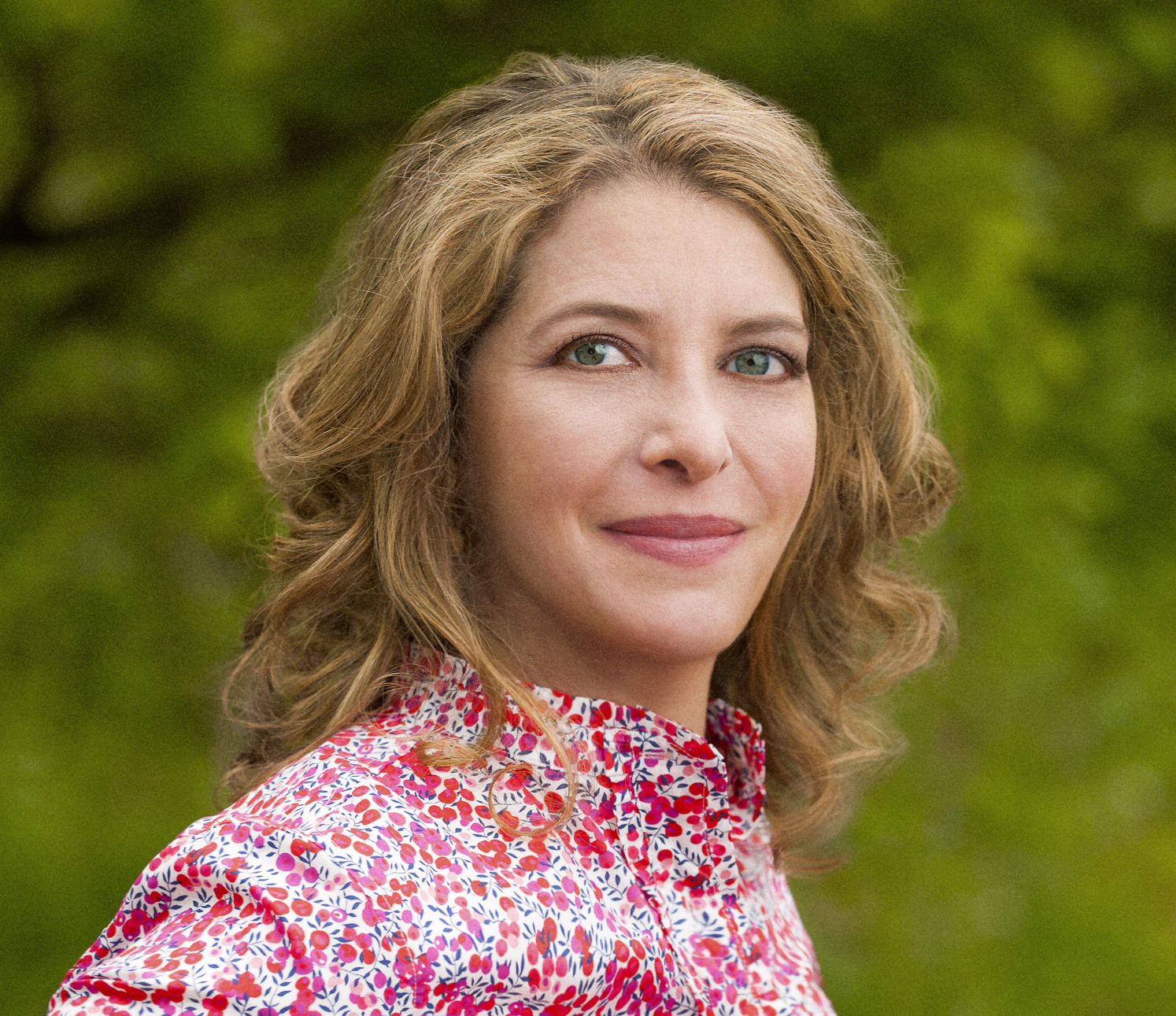
- Born: May 7, 1965 (age 61)
- Education: Stanford University; Oxford University (M.Phil.); University of Reading (PhD)

Nina Teicholz (born May 7, 1965) is an American journalist who advocates for the consumption of saturated fat, dairy products and meat. Her works include the 2014 book The Big Fat Surprise. She is the head of the Nutrition Coalition, a dietary advocacy group. Teicholz's work has been supported and financed by John D. Arnold and his Arnold Ventures group. Teicholz's views and assertions regarding the consumption of saturated fat and meat contradict mainstream medical advice and are controversial.

== Education and early life ==
Teicholz grew up in Berkeley, California.

She earned a degree in American Studies at Stanford University, and completed her master's in Latin American Studies at Oxford University. In 2024, she received a Ph.D. in nutrition from the University of Reading. Her Ph.D. was supervised by Ian Givens and Jeff Volek.

== Career ==
Teicholz worked as a reporter for National Public Radio and became a freelancer, contributing to publications including The New York Times, The Washington Post, Gourmet, The New Yorker, The Economist, Salon, and Men's Health.

She said that she became interested in dietary fats while doing a series of stories investigating food for Gourmet, and was assigned a story on trans fat that was published in 2004. For many years prior to this initial assignment on trans fats she had been a vegetarian. Her 2014 book, The Big Fat Surprise: Why Butter, Meat and Cheese Belong in a Healthy Diet, traced the history of US diet guidelines; in the book she discussed the science behind the guidelines and the influence of industry lobbying on them, and also questioned the emphasis on avoiding saturated fat. She advised readers to "eat butter; drink milk whole, and feed it to the whole family. Stock up on creamy cheeses, offal, and sausage, and yes, bacon". The book made The New York Times Best Seller list that year, and was named one of the Top 10 Non-Fiction Books of 2014 by The Wall Street Journal and one of the year's best science books by The Economist. The book was criticized by nutritionists including Marion Nestle.

Teicholz authored an opinion piece with similar themes in The Wall Street Journal in October 2014 that caught the attention of hedge fund founder John Arnold, who recruited her to join the efforts funded through his Laura and John Arnold Foundation to fight obesity, namely through the Nutrition Science Initiative, which does research, the Action Now Initiative, a lobbying group, and the Nutrition Coalition, which is aimed at improving dietary guidelines.

In February 2015, the US Dietary Guidelines Advisory Committee (DGAC) released its report, written to provide a foundation for the 2015 Dietary Guidelines for Americans, and The New York Times published an op-ed by Teicholz criticizing the committee and its work. The Arnold Foundation funded further work by Teicholz on the DGAC report, which was published in the British Medical Journal in September 2015. In that article, Teicholz continued the themes of her book and her February op-ed, and wrote that the DGAC showed bias against fat and meat and did not use all the available evidence, and that members had undisclosed conflicts of interest. The BMJ circulated a preprint of the article with a press release, and Teicholz' claims were widely covered in the media.

The DGAC, the US Department of Health and Human Services, the Center for Science in the Public Interest, and others, including 180 scientists signing a petition, harshly criticized Teicholz' claims, and they called for the BMJ to retract the article or issue corrections. The BMJ issued a correction in October 2015 and another in December 2016, the latter with a statement that after an independent review of the paper, it had decided not to retract it.

Meanwhile, the Arnold Foundation had been pressing for Congressional hearings about the DGAC report and attempted to block the release of the 2015 Dietary Guidelines for Americans; its lobbying group arranged meetings for Teicholz with members of Congress and White House staff. Teicholz and the Foundation were criticized at the time for being allies of the meat and dairy industries in their lobbying and other public relations efforts to maintain high levels of meat and dairy consumption by US consumers.

Teicholz' advocacy has been criticized by nutritionist Marion Nestle for making strong claims about the benefits of a low-carb, high-risk diet that go beyond what the science can support; Nestle wrote of Teicholz' advocacy: "It does little to foster the health of the public to make nutrition science appear more controversial than it really is."

Teicholz is an advocate of beef consumption. Beef industry leader Amanda Radke has written in Beef Daily that "Today's best beef advocates wear a variety of hats [...] like Nina Teicholz or Gary Taubes who turn against conventional health advice to promote diets rich in animal fats and proteins".

In 2017, Salim Yusuf stated that Teicholz "shook up the nutrition world but she got it right", a statement for which he was criticized.
