= Genius Factor Games =

Canadian independent video game developer

- Type: Private
- Industry: Video games
- Founded: 2008–2012
- Headquarters: North Vancouver, British Columbia
- Key people: Ted Nugent (Founder)
- Number of employees: < 10
- Parent: Independent
- Website: geniusfactorgames.com

Genius Factor Games was a Canadian independent video game developer based in North Vancouver. It developed independent ("indie") games for Apple iOS, Android and mobile platforms via direct-download distribution.

The company was founded in 2008 by Ted Nugent, a former employee of EA Canada. Its first game, released in April 2009, was Gravity Well, described as a cross between pinball and mini-golf. In November 2011, to coincide with CPR Month, Genius Factor Games created an app called Heart Hero for the Heart and Stroke Foundation of Canada. The app allows users to practice CPR to the beat of the Bee Gees' Stayin' Alive.

== Games ==
Game title	Release date	Platform
Gravity Well	April 9, 2009	iOS
Riese: Battle for Eleysia	October 16, 2010	iOS
Heart Hero	November 1, 2011	iOS
Pay Dirt: Treasures of Chichen Itza	November 9, 2012	iOS
