= Field Marshal Alexander Professor of Cardiovascular Medicine =

Professorship at the University of Oxford

The position of Field Marshal Alexander Professor of Cardiovascular Medicine at the University of Oxford was established in 1973 with funding provided by the British Heart Foundation (BHF) as a memorial to Field Marshal Earl Alexander of Tunis, the first president of the foundation. It was the first professorship to be established by the BHF.

The professor is a member of the Division of Cardiovascular Medicine, which is part of the Radcliffe Department of Medicine at the University, and is expected to conduct teaching and research, together with clinical duties as agreed. The professorship is associated with a professorial fellowship at Exeter College, Oxford.

The people to have held the position are:

- Peter Sleight 1973–94
- Hugh Christian Watkins 1994–2013
- Keith Channon 2014 onwards
