= Reneé Anne Street =

South African Scientist

Renee Anne Street
- Citizenship: South Africa
- Education: University of KwaZulu-Natal (PhD)
- Occupations: Public and Environmental Health Researcher
- Employer: South African Medical Research Council
- Awards: Fellow of the African Academy of Sciences

Reneé Anne Street is a South African public and environmental health researcher. She serves as a Specialist Scientist and Unit Director at the Environment and Health research unit of the South African Medical Research Council (SAMRC). She was elected as a fellow of the African Academy of Sciences in 2023.

== Education ==
Street earned both her MPH and PhD in Botany from the University of KwaZulu-Natal.

== Career ==
She held an honorary lecture position at the University of KwaZulu-Natal in 2010, after which she joined the South African Medical Research Council.

During the COVID-19 pandemic, she assisted in establishing the SAMRC Wastewater surveillance and research programme to study wastewater epidemiology. As the director of the Environment and Health research unit of the South African Medical Research Council, her research spans environmental contaminants and their effects on human health.

== Awards and recognition ==
Street was elected in 2023 as a fellow of the African Academy of Sciences. She is also featured in the International Network for Government Science Advice (INGSA) for leadership of the Persistent Toxic Substances programme.

== Selected publications ==
- Street, Renée; Malema, Shirley; Mahlangeni, Nomfundo; Mathee, Angela (2020). "Wastewater surveillance for Covid-19: An African perspective". Science of the Total Environment. 743 140719. Bibcode:2020ScTEn.74340719S. doi:10.1016/j.scitotenv.2020.140719. PMC 7332947. PMID 32659559.
- Street, R.A. (2012). "Heavy metals in medicinal plant products — An African perspective". South African Journal of Botany. 82: 67–74. Bibcode:2012SAJB...82...67S. doi:10.1016/j.sajb.2012.07.013.
- Keshaviah, Aparna; Diamond, Megan B; Wade, Matthew J; Scarpino, Samuel V; Ahmed, Warish; Amman, Fabian; Aruna, Olusola; Badilla-Aguilar, Andrei; Bar-Or, Itay; Bergthaler, Andreas; Bines, Julie E; Bivins, Aaron W; Boehm, Alexandria B; Brault, Jean-Martin; Burnet, Jean-Baptiste; Chapman, Joanne R; Chaudhuri, Angela; de Roda Husman, Ana Maria; Delatolla, Robert; Dennehy, John J; Diamond, Megan Beth; Donato, Celeste; Duizer, Erwin; Egwuenu, Abiodun; Erster, Oran; Fatta-Kassinos, Despo; Gaggero, Aldo; Gilpin, Deirdre F; Gilpin, Brent J; Graber, Tyson E; Green, Christopher A; Handley, Amanda; Hewitt, Joanne; Holm, Rochelle H; Insam, Heribert; Johnson, Marc C; Johnson, Rabia; Jones, Davey L; Julian, Timothy R; Jyothi, Asha; Keshaviah, Aparna; Kohn, Tamar; Kuhn, Katrin G; La Rosa, Giuseppina; Lesenfants, Marie; Manuel, Douglas G; D'Aoust, Patrick M; Markt, Rudolf; McGrath, John W; Medema, Gertjan; Moe, Christine L; Murni, Indah Kartika; Naser, Humood; Naughton, Colleen C; Ogorzaly, Leslie; Oktaria, Vicka; Ort, Christoph; Karaolia, Popi; Patel, Ekta H; Paterson, Steve; Rahman, Mahbubur; Rivera-Navarro, Pablo; Robinson, Alex; Santa-Maria, Monica C; Scarpino, Samuel V; Schmitt, Heike; Smith, Theodore; Stadler, Lauren B; Stassijns, Jorgen; Stenico, Alberta; Street, Renee A; Suffredini, Elisabetta; Susswein, Zachary; Trujillo, Monica; Wade, Matthew J; Wolfe, Marlene K; Yakubu, Habib; Zanoli Sato, Maria Ines (2023). "Wastewater monitoring can anchor global disease surveillance systems". The Lancet Global Health. 11 (6): e976–e981. doi:10.1016/S2214-109X(23)00170-5. hdl:10568/131074. PMID 37202030.
