= Glenda Gray =

South African researcher

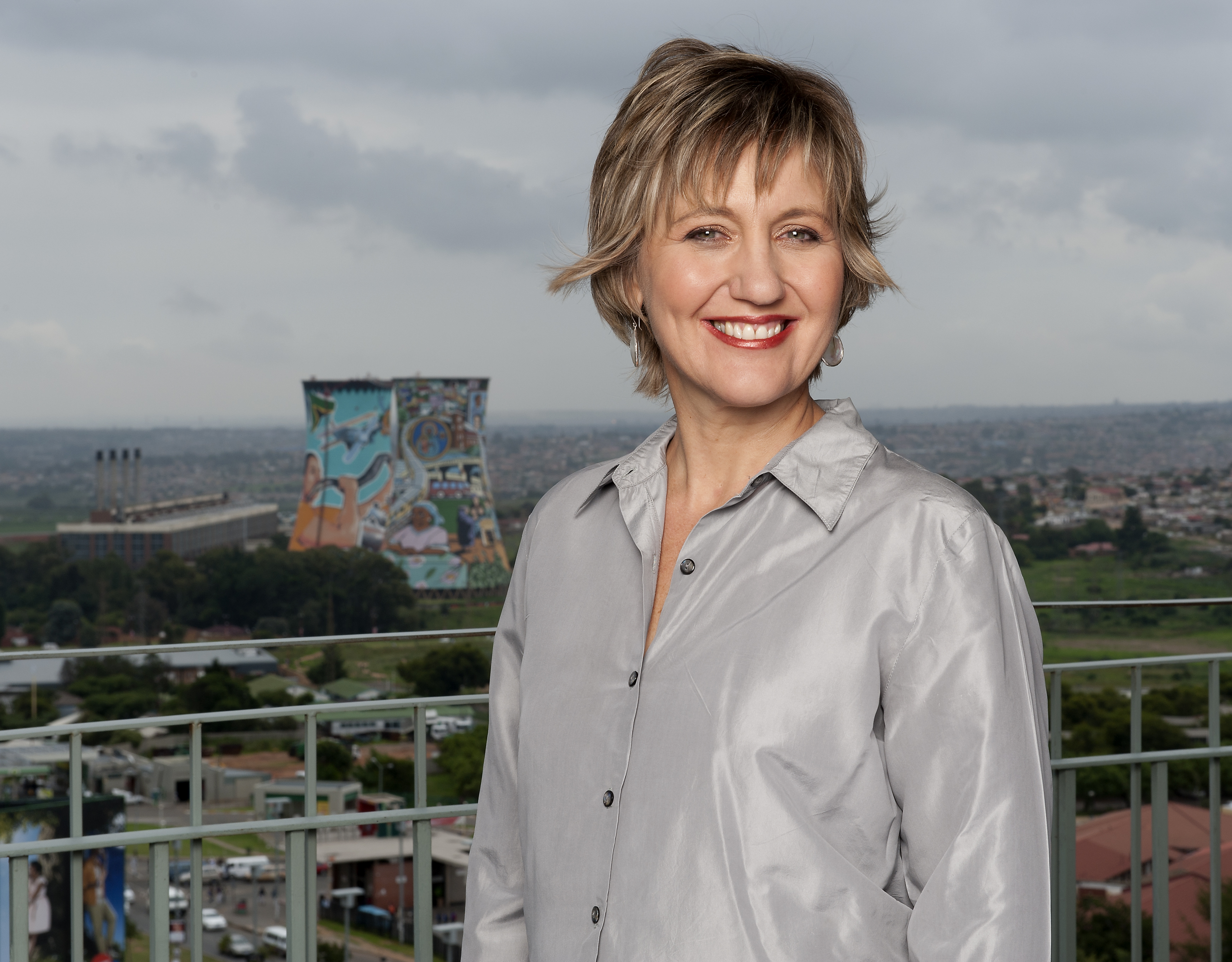
- Born: 14 December 1962 (age 63); Boksburg
- Education: University of the Witwatersrand; Colleges of Medicine of South Africa
- Known for: HIV research President of the South African Medical Research Council
- Children: 3
- Scientific career
- Fields: Medicine, pediatrics, HIV
- Workplaces: University of the Witwatersrand; South African Medical Research Council; Columbia University

Glenda Elisabeth Gray MB BCh, FC Paeds, DSc (hc), OMS is a South African physician, scientist and activist specializing in the care of children and in HIV medicine. In 2012, she was awarded South Africa's highest honour, the Order of Mapungubwe (Silver). She became the first female president of the South African Medical Research Council in 2014, was recognized as one of the "100 Most Influential People" by Time in 2017 and was listed amongst "Africa's 50 Most Powerful Women" by Forbes Africa in 2020. Her research expertise involves developing microbicides for sexually transmitted diseases and HIV vaccines.

== Early life, education and career ==
Gray was the fifth of six children born in the gold mining town Boksburg, South Africa in 1962. Her father was a mechanical engineer at the mines and her mother was a bookkeeper. Under the apartheid government of the time, Boksburg was a low income, racially segregated town. Her family were not typical of the residents of the town in that they had black friends.

Gray decided from the age of 6 that she would become a doctor. Her family valued education greatly: her father was the first in his family to attend college and five of the six children went to university. Three of them, including Gray, continued to higher degrees and pursued academic careers, but their father did not live to see this as he died when Gray was 16.

=== Anti-apartheid activism ===
Gray entered the University of the Witwatersrand in 1980 where she studied at the medical school for six years followed by seven years of specialization in pediatrics. Her siblings were already at the university and one of her brothers was involved with a radical student union that was opposed to apartheid. Gray joined the Health Workers Association, a group intent on desegregating South Africa's hospitals. In 1983 the first HIV/AIDS cases and deaths were confirmed in South Africa and Gray committed to educating South African communities about how to prevent HIV.

=== HIV research and activism ===
By the time that Gray completed her training as a pediatrician in 1993, HIV was prevalent among many children admitted to Chris Hani Baragwanath Hospital, situated on the outskirts of South Africa's largest black township, Soweto. In 1993 Gray, along with colleague James McIntyre, co-founded a perinatal HIV clinic.

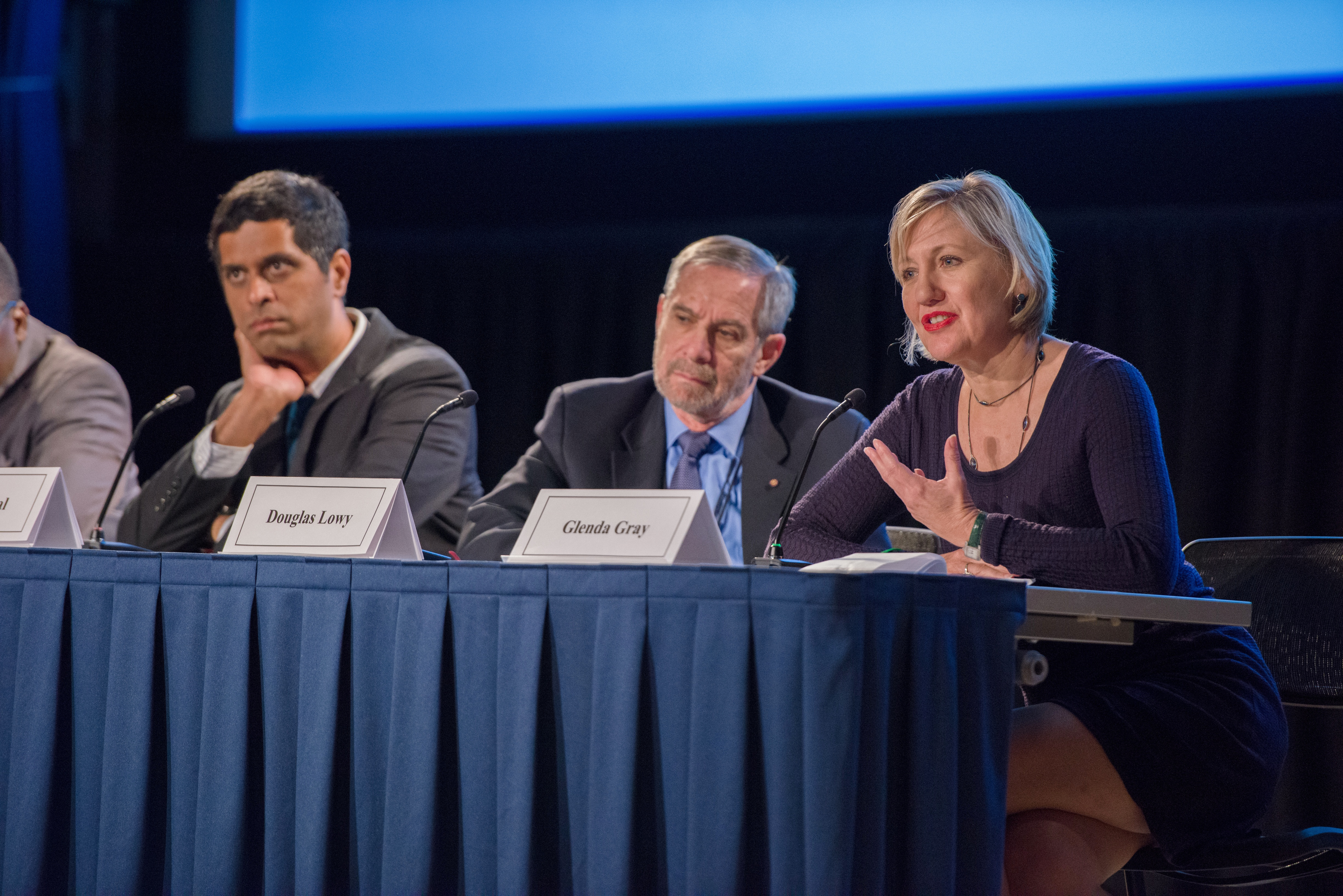
Glenda Gray (right) at the Fogarty NIH 50th symposium, 1 May 2018

In 1996, Gray started the UNAIDS PETRA study, in five urban settings in South Africa, Tanzania and Uganda, to determine the effectiveness of a shorter anti-retroviral regimen. In 1999 she was awarded an International Fogarty Fellowship to study Clinical Epidemiology.

She was the executive director of the Perinatal HIV Research Unit (PHRU), part of the Medical School of the University of the Witwatersrand, based at Chris Hani Baragwanath Hospital prior to her appointment as president of the medical research council in 2014. HIV was generally not recorded as a cause of death during the 1990s and 2000s but its effects could be seen in the infant and child mortality rates.

In early 2020, an efficacy study for an HIV vaccine led by Gray was stopped early. The study, involving 5407 HIV-uninfected participants, was started in 2016 and should have continued until 2022. However, preliminary data viewed in January 2020 to evaluate safety and efficacy showed 129 HIV infections in the vaccinated group and 123 in the placebo control group. Many HIV scientists did not believe the study would succeed, as a previous efficacy study in Thailand had shown an efficacy of only 31%. Gray believed that owing to the severity of the HIV epidemic in South Africa a new trial was worthwhile pursuing. The independent monitoring board that evaluated the interim results concluded that it was futile to continue with the study.

== Other activities ==
- Coalition for Epidemic Preparedness Innovations (CEPI), Member of the Scientific Advisory Committee (since 2023)

== Recognition and membership ==
Gray is a member of the Academy of Science of South Africa, a foreign associate of the United States Institute of Medicine, an A-rated National Research Foundation of South Africa scientist, a co-principal investigator for the HIV Vaccine Trials Network and a fellow of the American Academy of Microbiology. She was elected a Fellow of the Royal Society in 2026.

In addition:

- In 1997 Gray was awarded "Femina Woman of the 90's".
- Gray was profiled as one of the "Icons of the Century" in Longevity Magazine's Millennium Collectors issue.
- In 2001, Science magazine profiled Gray and her colleague, James McIntyre.
- Gray was presented with the 2002 Mandela Award for Health and Human Rights by Nelson Mandela.
- In 2003, Gray was profiled in the book Inspirational Women at Work.
- In 2009 she was awarded the N’Galy – Mann lectureship in recognition of her HIV research contribution.
- She holds an honorary doctorate from Simon Fraser University awarded in 2012.
- In 2013, she was awarded the "Outstanding African Scientist Award" by the European and Developing Countries Clinical Trials Partnership.
- 2013 The Order of Mapungubwe: Silver
- Gray was elected a member of the African Academy of Sciences in 2015.
- Gray was named one of "The 100 Most Influential People" by Time in 2017.
- In 2019 Rhodes University in Grahamstown awarded Gray an honorary doctorate in laws (LLD, hc).
- Gray was listed amongst "Africa's 50 Most Powerful Women" by Forbes Africa in 2020.

== Controversies ==
=== Infant formula ===
Gray has not been a stranger to controversy. At her first research presentation in 1996 at an international AIDS conference, she championed the position that HIV positive women in developing countries should feed their babies infant formula rather than breast milk to avoid the transmission of HIV from mother to child. The prevailing opinion at that time was that the risk of infant death by diarrheal diseases, caused by mixing contaminated water with the infant formula, outweighed the chance of contracting HIV. Gray's research in the Soweto communities indicated that infant formula could be safely used, but this put her in direct conflict with the activists who had led boycotts against Nestle, because of their infant formula, since the 1970s. Subsequent research on the topic demonstrated high deaths in formula fed compared to breastfed children of HIV-infected mothers.

=== AZT ===
The drug Zidovudine (also known as azidothymidine (AZT)) is an anti-retroviral drug that can be used to prevent the transmission of HIV from mother to child during childbirth. The course of the treatment was 14 weeks, and women in developing countries could not afford this. Despite criticism from an editorial of The New England Journal of Medicine, Gray conducted a trial (replicating a study from Thailand) using a shorter course of treatment against a placebo which proved that the shorter course was effective. However, the South African government, under president Thabo Mbeki and health minister Nkosazana Dlamini-Zuma, refused permission for the drug to be used, as it was considered too expensive. Gray was involved in the clandestine procurement of the drug and treatment of patients, in opposition to the government.

Gray was involved in starting the Treatment Action Campaign (TAC), along with Zackie Achmat and others, as an HIV/AIDS activist organisation. Only after Gray received the 2002 Mandela Award for Health and Human Rights and the legal battles in 2003 involving the TAC, were nevirapine, a drug more effective than AZT in preventing mother to child transmission of HIV, and other anti-retrovirals officially sanctioned by the government for use in South Africa. By then, Nkosazana Dlamini-Zuma had been replaced as Minister of Health by Manto Tshabalala-Msimang and the argument against anti-retrovirals had changed from one of affordability to the endorsement of traditional African medicine over conventional treatment.

=== COVID-19 ===
In 2020, Gray was appointed to the South African government's Medical Advisory Committee owing to the COVID-19 pandemic in South Africa. On 26 March 2020, the South African government imposed an almost total lockdown on all inhabitants. From 1 May 2020, the lockdown was gradually lifted under a five-stage plan. On 15 May 2020, Gray said, "Initially, there was good reason to implement the lockdown to slow down the spread of the virus and buy time to ready the health system, and this was largely achieved". She now felt that "the lockdown should be eradicated completely, and that non-pharmaceutical interventions (NPI), such as handwashing, wearing masks, social distancing and prohibitions on gatherings, should be put in place." In addition she noted that:

- An increasing number of malnutrition cases were being seen in hospitals, including at Chris Hani Baragwanath Hospital. "We have not seen malnutrition for decades and so we are seeing it for the first time in the hospital", she said.
- The phasing out of the lockdown in a "month-to-month" fashion had no basis in science. Many lockdown regulations seemed to be "thumb-sucks", made up on the spot with little rationale behind them.

She told the media:

This strategy is not based in science and is completely unmeasured. [It's] almost as if someone is sucking regulations out of their thumb and implementing rubbish, quite frankly. In the face of a young population, we refuse to let people out. We make them exercise for three hours a day and then complain that there's congestion in this time. We punish children and kick them out of school and we deny them education. For what? Where is the scientific evidence for that?

Health minister Zweli Mkhize stated that Gray had "made factually incorrect and unfounded statements". He pointed out that the government had appointed a research subcommittee to which Gray belongs to advise them. He said that the thumb-suck comment "undermines the joint work and effort that the National Coronavirus Command Council, Cabinet and government as a whole have been engaged in." With regard to the comment on schooling he said: "The Department of Basic Education has been engaged in various consultations with its stakeholders on the correct approach to take in the process of opening schools."

Subsequent to Mkhize's comments, the acting director general of the Department of Health, Anban Pillay, said that an investigation into Gray's conduct was needed. On 25 May 2020, the South African Medical Research Council apologized for Gray's statements and barred its staff from speaking to the media while more than 250 academics issued statements of support for her.

On the following day, 26 May 2020, Mkhize said that he "considers the Professor Glenda Gray matter closed", and he mentioned that "there is no basis to suggest any interference with academic freedom".

== Selected publications ==
Gray has authored or co-authored more than 300 scientific articles, including:

- MADHI, SHABIR A.; GRAY, GLENDA E.; HUEBNER, ROBIN E.; SHERMAN, GAYLE; MCKINNON, DIANE; PETTIFOR, JOHN M. (1999). "Correlation between CD4+ lymphocyte counts, concurrent antigen skin test and tuberculin skin test reactivity in human immunodeficiency virus type 1-infected and -uninfected children with tuberculosis". The Pediatric Infectious Disease Journal. 18 (9). Ovid Technologies (Wolters Kluwer Health): 800–805. doi:10.1097/00006454-199909000-00011. ISSN 0891-3668. PMID 10493341.
- Schramm, Diana B.; Kuhn, Louise; Gray, Glenda E.; Tiemessen, Caroline T. (2006). "In Vivo Effects of HIV-1 Exposure in the Presence and Absence of Single-Dose Nevirapine on Cellular Plasma Activation Markers of Infants Born to HIV-1-Seropositive Mothers". Journal of Acquired Immune Deficiency Syndromes. 42 (5). Ovid Technologies (Wolters Kluwer Health): 545–553. doi:10.1097/01.qai.0000225009.30698.ce. ISSN 1525-4135. PMC 2367220. PMID 16837862.
- Mnyani, Coceka N.; Tait, Carol L.; Peters, Remco P.H.; Struthers, Helen; Violari, Avy; Gray, Glenda; Buchmann, Eckhart J.; Chersich, Matthew F.; McIntyre, James A. (23 March 2020). "Implementation of a PMTCT programme in a high HIV prevalence setting in Johannesburg, South Africa: 2002–2015". Southern African Journal of HIV Medicine. 21 (1). AOSIS: 1024. doi:10.4102/sajhivmed.v21i1.1024. ISSN 2078-6751. PMC 7136691. PMID 32284888.
- Shen, Xiaoying; Laher, Fatima; Moodie, Zoe; McMillan, Arthur S.; Spreng, Rachel L.; Gilbert, Peter B.; Huang, Ying; Yates, Nicole L.; Grunenberg, Nicole; Juliana McElrath, M.; Allen, Mary; Pensiero, Michael; Mehra, Vijay L.; Der Meeren, Olivier Van; Barnett, Susan W.; Phogat, Sanjay; Gray, Glenda E.; Bekker, Linda-Gail; Corey, Lawrence; Tomaras, Georgia D. (7 February 2020). "HIV-1 Vaccine Sequences Impact V1V2 Antibody Responses: A Comparison of Two Poxvirus Prime gp120 Boost Vaccine Regimens". Scientific Reports. 10 (1). Springer Science and Business Media LLC: 2093. Bibcode:2020NatSR..10.2093S. doi:10.1038/s41598-020-57491-z. ISSN 2045-2322. PMC 7005751. PMID 32034163.

Gray has contributed to and been featured in several books including:

- Mbali, M. (2013). South African AIDS Activism and Global Health Politics. Global Ethics. Palgrave Macmillan UK. ISBN 978-1-137-31216-7.
- Mayer, K.H.; Pizer, H.F. (2009). HIV Prevention: A Comprehensive Approach. Elsevier Science. ISBN 978-0-08-092129-7.
- Oppenheimer, Gerald M.; Bayer, Ronald (2007). Shattered Dreams: An Oral History of the South African AIDS Epidemic. Oxford University Press, USA. ISBN 978-0-19-530730-6.
- Turok, K.; Orford, M. (2006). Life and Soul: Portraits of Women who Move South Africa. Double Storey. ISBN 978-1-77013-043-2.
- Kritzinger, Lisel (2003). Inspirational women at work : 52 personal and life experiences shared to empower, encourage, uplift and inspire. Pretoria: LAPA. p. 302. ISBN 978-0-7993-3177-6. OCLC 54828454.

Educational offices
Preceded by Salim Abdool Karim	President of the South African Medical Research Council; 2014 – 2024	Succeeded by Ntobeko Ntusi
