= Ntobeko Ntusi =

South African cardiologist and academic

Ntobeko Ayanda Bubele Ntusi
- Born: 1977 (age 48–49); Mthatha, Eastern Cape, South Africa
- Education: Haverford College; University of Cape Town; University of Oxford
- Scientific career
- Fields: Cardiology; Internal medicine
- Workplaces: University of Cape Town; Groote Schuur Hospital; South African Medical Research Council
- Thesis: Characterisation of cardiovascular involvement in inflammatory arthropathies and systemic rheumatic diseases using multi-parametric cardiovascular magnetic resonance
- Doctoral advisor: Bongani Mayosi

Ntobeko Ayanda Bubele Ntusi (born 1977) is a South African cardiologist and academic. He is President and Chief Executive Officer of the South African Medical Research Council (SAMRC) and professor of medicine at the University of Cape Town. He is a member of the Academy of Science of South Africa.

== Early life and education ==
Ntusi was born in Mthatha in the Eastern Cape, South Africa. He completed a Bachelor of Science degree at Haverford College before studying medicine at the University of Cape Town, where he obtained the MBChB degree.

He later specialised in internal medicine and cardiology through the Colleges of Medicine of South Africa. At the University of Cape Town, he undertook doctoral research on cardiomyopathy in Black South Africans under the supervision of his mentor, the late Bongani Mayosi. He later completed a DPhil in cardiovascular medicine at the University of Oxford.

== Career ==
Ntusi trained at Groote Schuur Hospital in Cape Town and joined the faculty of the University of Cape Town.

He served as Chair and Head of the Department of Medicine at the University of Cape Town before his appointment to the South African Medical Research Council.

In 2024, he was appointed President and Chief Executive Officer of the South African Medical Research Council.

== Research ==
Ntusi's research focuses on cardiovascular disease in Africa, inflammatory heart disease, and the use of cardiac magnetic resonance imaging. He has co-authored studies on cardiovascular disease in sub-Saharan Africa with researchers including Liesl Zühlke.

== Selected publications ==
- Ntusi, NAB; Ntsekhe, M (2019). "Battling cardiovascular diseases in a perfect storm". Circulation. 139 (21): 2442–2444. doi:10.1161/CIRCULATIONAHA.118.038001. PMID 30933612.
- Zühlke, L; Ntusi, N (2019). "Cardiovascular diseases in sub-Saharan Africa: challenges and opportunities". Nature Reviews Cardiology. 16 (10): 589–600. doi:10.1038/s41569-019-0269-z. PMID 31551590.
- Ntusi, NAB (2018). "Cardiovascular magnetic resonance in inflammatory heart disease". Cardiovascular Journal of Africa. 29 (5): 280–286. PMID 30067271.

Preceded by Glenda Gray	President of the South African Medical Research Council; 2024–present	Succeeded by Incumbent
