= United OneHeart Foundation =

Non-profit research and development organisation

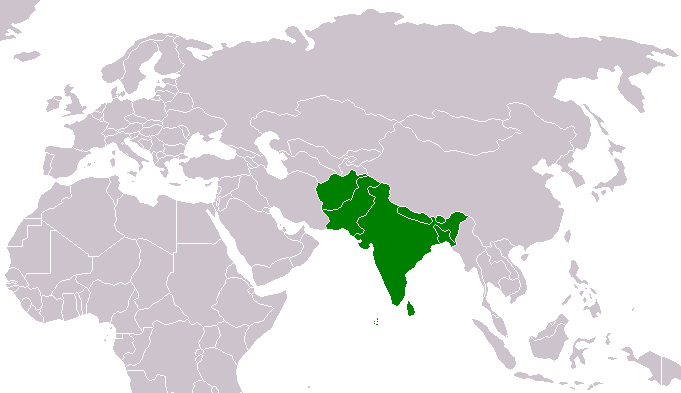

United OneHeart Foundation is a non-profit research and development organisation. Its stated mission is as a non-profit organisation to help people to improve the quality of life by fostering improvements in medicine with the aim of decreasing impact of cardiovascular diseases with focus on India and South Asia.

The organisation focuses on health-related activities in the Indian state Karnataka while advocating to decrease the impact of heart diseases all over country mainly among children and youth. It has centers in Bangalore and Mangalore.

On the activities scale, the foundation work is uniquely global in its approach, concentrating on its work entirely on public health and medical education in the last decade, it aims mainly on cardiovascular disease management. Its focus is primarily on developing countries like India and on medical care for youths.

== History ==
United OneHeart Foundation was envisioned in Bangalore, India in 1994 by Rahul Shetty, at the time a University Medical Student.

== Health education ==
The foundation aims to inform people around the world and tries to engage them in the global effort for health and development in developing countries. They advocate reducing the impact of heart diseases through the advancement of research and its application and the promotion of healthy and well balanced living. They partner regularly with other organizations like the World Heart Federation based in Geneva, Switzerland. It participates in World Heart Day activities every year.

The Foundation conducts regular Heart Disease screening activities in state of Karnataka, India to increase the awareness of cardiac disease and its potential impact and to detect heart diseases at an early stage. They also distribute health related articles for the benefit of community to increase awareness about heart disease.

To enable high-quality learning resources and technologies accessible to students and teachers from low-income communities, it conducts research on making this a reality. To this aim it has contributed over half a million Indian rupees towards research and development efforts.

== Medical technologies ==
United OneHeart Foundation also fosters sustainable developments by producing innovations that improve practices of health and health education in cardiovascular disease management, it conducts research and development for new low cost medical technologies which aims to benefit communities in developing countries.

In October, 2006, the Foundation entered into a partnership with the IBM Corporation agreeing to encourage the community members to contribute their idle PC time to assist humanitarian research and focus on medical issues by joining World Community Grid Project.

== See also ==
- British Heart Foundation
- National Heart Foundation of Australia
- Heart and Stroke Foundation of Canada
- Howard Hughes Medical Institute of Chevy Chase, Maryland
- Bill & Melinda Gates Foundation of Seattle, Washington
