= Peter Sleight =

British cardiologist (1929–2020)

Professor Peter Sleight FRCP
- Born: 27 June 1929; Boston Spa, Yorkshire, England
- Died: 7 October 2020 (aged 91)
- Education: Cambridge University; St Bartholomew's Hospital; Oxford University
- Known for: Chronic heart failure research Aspirin research Cardiac pacemaker research
- Medical career
- Profession: Medicine
- Institutions: Oxford University; St George's Hospital Medical School
- Sub-specialties: Cardiology

Peter Sleight (27 June 1929 – 7 October 2020) was a British research cardiologist and an Honorary Consultant Physician at the John Radcliffe Hospital in Oxford and the Oxford University Hospitals NHS Foundation Trust. Sleight was Emeritus Field Marshal Alexander Professor of Cardiovascular Medicine at the University of Oxford and an Emeritus Fellow of Exeter College, Oxford.

== Overview ==
Peter Sleight was a consultant physician/cardiologist in Oxford from 1964. He retired from the British Heart Foundation (BHF)-sponsored Field Marshal Alexander Chair of Cardiovascular Medicine in 1994, but continued to work at the John Radcliffe Hospital in Oxford. He was Deputy Chairman of the HPS Steering Committee.

Sleight was a Fellow of the American College of Cardiology and an authority in the field of cardiology research. He served on the editorial board for many cardiology journals in the world such as Cardiovascular Research, Cardiovascular Risk, Circulation, Hypertension, the British Heart Journal, Clinical & Experimental Physiology & Pharmacology, and the Journal of Ambulatory Monitoring. He peer reviewed articles and co-authored scientific papers on topics such as blood pressure monitoring and control, autonomic control of the circulation, prognostic value of measures of heart rate variability, and pathophysiology of ischaemic heart disease, heart failure, and hypertension in journals such as The Lancet, New England Journal of Medicine, Circulation, Heart, European Heart Journal, the British Medical Journal and Clinical Science.

Sleight was considered to be among world leading eminent cardiologists and co-authored over 500 papers. His work according to Microsoft Academic Search has been cited in over 40,000 papers and in hundreds of text books in the field of cardiology.

Sleight was President of the World Hypertension League from 1995–2000 and served as chair of the ISIS group steering committee and the related coronary prevention studies coordinated by the Clinical Trials Service Unit in Oxford. Previously, he was a consultant physician/cardiologist in Oxford beginning in 1964.

== Early life and education ==
He was born in Hull, the eldest of three children of William Sleight, a town planner in Leeds, and Mary (nee Westmoreland) Sleight. He had two siblings, Eileen and Malcolm. He was educated at Leeds Grammar School and Gonville and Caius College, Cambridge. He studied Medicine at Cambridge University and at St Bartholomew's Hospital Medical School, qualifying in medicine in 1953.

== Career ==
=== Medical career ===
In 1964, Consultant Cardiologist Dr Peter Sleight in conjunction with Cardiac Surgeon Dr Alf Gunning from South Africa performed one of the first pioneering operations to install an external Lucas cardiac pacemaker on a patient in her early 30s at the Radcliffe Infirmary in Oxford. This involved attaching circular coils internally to the patient's heart and with coils aligned on the outside skin of the patient to transfer the electrical charge from the Artificial cardiac pacemaker connected to external batteries. The patient had previously spent many months connected to a filing cabinet size artificial heart machine known as the "fire engine" because of its red colour.

Sleight completed over 50 years service working for the National Health Service.

=== Research career ===
Sleight is accredited for being the first to carry out studies of the effect of Aspirin on cardiac function and stroke prevention in the early 1970s. Sleight is Emeritus Professor of Cardiovascular Medicine at Oxford University. Sleight and his research team at Oxford led the way and formed the foundation for the research into the use of aspirin in the prevention of other medical conditions.

Sleight was an active leading contributor to the field of cardiology research. As chair of the ISIS group steering committee he was involved in several significant international trials in cardiology, such as the use of Aspirin (ISIS-2), Thrombolysis (ISIS 2&3), ACE Inhibitors (HOPE) and Statins (HPS). He served on several data monitoring committees of major clinical trials, including Gusto, ECLA, ASCOT, ADVANCE, EUCLID, MODEST, CREATE, OASIS 5–7, COMMIT, VALUE, PACE, SCOUT, RELY, ORIGIN, GISSI-HF, ONTARGET, TRANSCEND and PrOFESS.

Recent research has assessed the prognostic value of measures of heart rate variability, and pathophysiological processes underlying the changes found in patients prone to ischaemic heart disease, heart failure, and hypertension.

== Awards ==
Peter Sleight received a number of awards, including the American College of Cardiology (ACC) Young Investigator's Award in 1963, the Evian Award for Medicine and Science, International Society of Hypertension – MSD Award for distinguished research, the Galen Medal for Therapeutics 2000 (Society of Apothecaries), the Mackenzie Medal, British Cardiac Society, Louis Bishop Lecturer American College of Cardiology, the Alberto Zanchetti Lifetime Achievement Award, Gold Medal European Society of Hypertension and a Lifetime Research Award, Russian Federation of Cardiology, Bayer International Aspirin (R) Senior Award 2000.

== Personal life ==
In 1953 he married Gillian France, whom he met when they were both students at St. Bartholomew's, and who became a public health physician. They had two children. They resided in Wheatley, Oxfordshire, for many years.

Sleight suffered a stroke in 2015. He died on 7 October 2020.
