= Hugh Christian Watkins =

British cardiologist

Hugh Christian Watkins FRS FRCP FMedSci
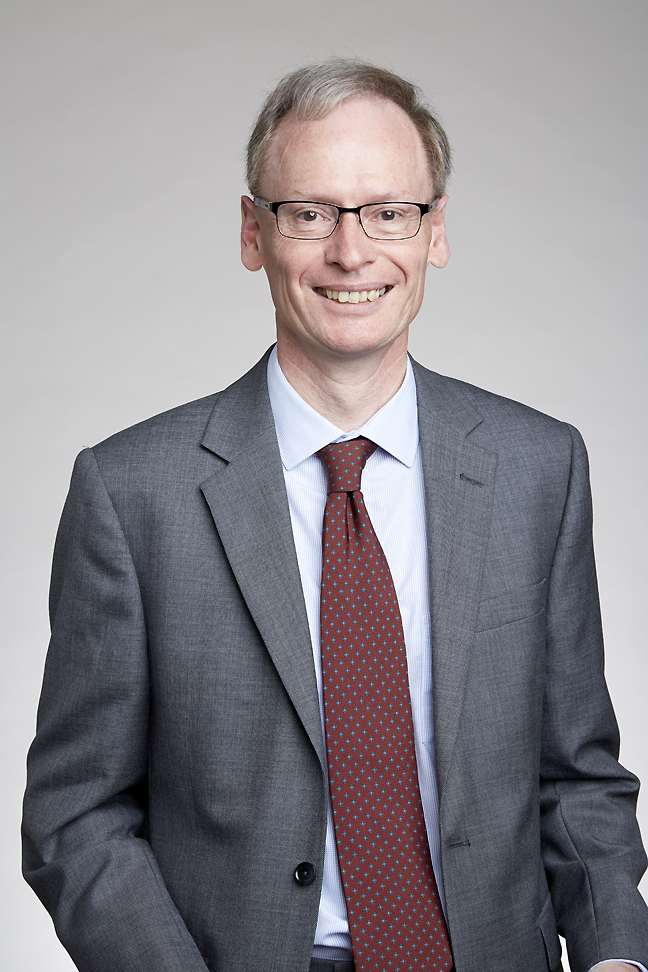
- Watkins in 2017
- Born: 7 June 1959 (age 67)
- Education: Gresham's School
- Alma mater: St Bartholomew's Hospital Medical College; University of London
- Scientific career
- Workplaces: University of Oxford; Harvard Medical School
- Thesis: Demonstration that cardiac troponin T mutations cause hypertrophic cardiomyopathy (1996)
- Notable students: Bongani Mayosi
- Website: www.rdm.ox.ac.uk/principal-investigators/researcher/hugh-watkins

Hugh Christian Watkins (born 7 June 1959) is a British cardiologist. He is a Fellow of Merton College, Oxford, an associate editor of Circulation Research, and was Field Marshal Alexander Professor of Cardiovascular Medicine in the University of Oxford between 1996 and 2013.

== Early life and education ==
The son of Dr David Watkins, a Norfolk physician, and his wife Gillian Mary, Watkins was educated at Gresham's School, Holt, Norfolk and the St Bartholomew's Hospital Medical College, graduating in 1983 with both Bachelor of Science and Bachelor of Medicine, Bachelor of Surgery degrees. In 1984 he gained the Brackenbury & Bourne Prize in General Medicine. He was awarded a PhD from the University of London in 1995.

== Career and Research ==
Watkins was a house physician in the Professorial Medical Unit at St Bartholomew's Hospital in 1984–1985, then a senior house officer in Medicine at the John Radcliffe Hospital, Oxford, from 1985 to 1987. He was then briefly a senior house officer in Neurology at St Bartholomew's, before two years as a Registrar in Medicine and Cardiology at St Thomas's Hospital, London, from 1987 to 1989. His next posts were as a lecturer in Cardiological Sciences at St George's Hospital, London, and as Resident Fellow in Medicine at the Harvard Medical School and Brigham and Women's Hospital, Boston. In 1995 he was appointed an assistant professor of medicine at the Harvard Medical School and as associate physician at the Brigham & Women's Hospital, and in 1996 as Field Marshal Alexander Professor of Cardiovascular Medicine in the University of Oxford.

Watkins was elected to Membership of the Royal College of Physicians (MRCP) in 1987, graduated MD and PhD from the University of London in 1995, and was appointed a Fellow of the Royal College of Physicians (FRCP) in 1997.

At Oxford, Watkins is the Director of the British Heart Foundation's Molecular Cardiology Laboratory in the Wellcome Trust Centre for Human Genetics and of its Centre of Research Excellence, one of six similar programmes in the United Kingdom. He is also an associate editor of the academic journal Circulation Research.

Watkins's main specialism is in molecular genetic analysis of cardiovascular disease, and his most notable work is on the inheritance of heart disease, especially on hypertrophic cardiomyopathy and the genetic causes of "sudden cardiac death". He is chairman of an international group which investigates genetic susceptibility to coronary artery disease, which has funding from the European Commission.

=== Honours and awards ===
- British Heart Foundation Clinical Scientist Fellow, 1990
- Young Research Worker Prize of the British Cardiac Society 1992
- Fellow of the Royal College of Physicians, 1997
- Goulstonian Lecturer, Royal College of Physicians, 1998
- Graham Bull Prize, Royal College of Physicians, 2003
- Thomas Lewis Lecturer, British Cardiac Society, 2004
- Elected a Fellow of the Academy of Medical Sciences
- Fellow of the American Heart Association
- Elected Fellow of the Royal Society in 2017.

=== Publications ===
- Clinical Implications of Beta Cardiac Myosin Heavy Chain Mutations in Hypertrophic Cardiomyopathy (University of London, 1996)
- Papers in scientific journals, including the New England Journal of Medicine, Cell, and Nature Genetics

== Personal life ==
In 1987, Watkins married Elizabeth Bridget Hewett, and they have one son and one daughter. In Who's Who his recreations are stated as "photography and Oriental porcelain".
