= Salim Yusuf =

Canadian physician (born 1952)

- Born: 26 November 1952 (age 73); Kottarakkara
- Education: St. John's Medical College; Oxford University
- Known for: President of the World Heart Federation
- Awards: Rhodes Scholarship; Canadian Medical Hall of Fame; Canada Gairdner Wightman Award McLaughlin medal of the Royal Society of Canada
- Scientific career
- Fields: Medicine; Cardiology; Epidemiology
- Workplaces: Population Health Research Institute; McMaster University Medical School; National Institutes of Health
- Thesis: Beta adrenergic blokade in myocardial infarction (1980)
- Doctoral advisor: Peter Sleight

Salim Yusuf OC FRSC (born 26 November 1952) is an Indian-born Canadian physician, the Marion W. Burke Chair in Cardiovascular Disease at McMaster University Medical School. He is a cardiologist and epidemiologist, and is well known for his cardiology-related clinical trial research. He also formerly served as president of the World Heart Federation. Yusuf has criticized the Dietary Guidelines for Americans and disputes the scientific consensus on dietary sodium and saturated fat intake.

== Early life and education ==
Salim Yusuf was born in 1952 in a middle class family in the town of Kottarakkara in Kerala, India, and was educated at schools in Kottarakkara, as well as Mumbai and Kochi. Yusuf stated that his father compelled him to get into medicine. Following a number of failed attempts, Yusuf studied medicine at St. John's Medical College in Bangalore. Yusuf recounted that he “was very aware that I was not the brightest student”, and that he "just had to work as hard as possible to keep up with my peers". Yusuf later earned a DPhil at Oxford University as a Rhodes scholar. Yusuf has stated that he became interested in cardiology "partly because it was such a logical specialty and partly because it was a field in which we thought we could do much to help patients". Despite admitting that prior to studying at Oxford that he had "very little direct interest in research", at Oxford he took part in research into cardiovascular disease.

His doctoral thesis was titled "Beta adrenergic blockade in myocardial infarction" and his supervisor was Peter Sleight.

== Career ==
In 1984, Yusuf moved to the National Institutes of Health in the United States, where he led clinical trials that showed the value of ACE inhibitors in people with left ventricular dysfunction and the optimal use of digoxin). He came to the Michael G. DeGroote School of Medicine at McMaster University in 1992 as director of the cardiology division. In 1999 McMaster created the Population Health Research Institute at the Hamilton Health Sciences campus of McMaster, and made Yusuf the director of the center and vice president of research at HHS.

From 1999 to 2004, he also held an appointment as a senior scientist at the Canadian Institutes of Health Research.

One of Yusuf's most cited research studies is the INTERHEART study published in The Lancet in 2004, a case-control study regarding the risk factors of myocardial infarction (commonly known as heart attacks) with participants in 52 countries.

In 2011, he was the world's second-most-cited cardiology researcher, and in 2020, he was the world's most-cited cardiology researcher. Yusuf's large-scale clinical trials have had a significant impact on the treatment and prevention of cardiovascular and cerebrovascular disease. in particular, he has demonstrated the value of combinations of blood pressure lowering and lipid lowering with statins and of combinations of antiplatelet therapy and joint use of anticoagulants and aspirin in low doses to prevent cardiovascular disease and death.

He was a past president of the World Heart Federation 2015–2016, where he initiated the Emerging Leaders Program which is now named after him.

=== Views on saturated fat and salt intake and their relationship to cardiovascular disease ===
Yusuf has disputed the prevailing view in the medical community that increased consumption of saturated fat and dietary sodium causes cardiovascular disease and has questioned dietary guidelines that call for reduction in their intake. In 2017, Yusuf spoke at the Cardiology Update 2017 symposium in which he disputed the saturated fat guidelines whilst admitting he is not an expert in nutrition. He stated that a higher saturated fat intake is protective and eating more dietary carbohydrates is harmful. Yusuf has commented that "saturated fats are not harmful, may even be slightly beneficial but there is no harm", and recommends people to consume high-fat dairy products and unprocessed red meat. These ideas were criticized by other medical researchers and nutritionists such as David L. Katz, who described them as "bizarre" and "misguided".

Yusuf has questioned the consensus on salt and cardiovascular disease and has argued that a low sodium intake does not lower risk of cardiovascular events and mortality but increases it. In 2018, he co-authored a controversial paper which argued that sodium intake is associated with cardiovascular disease only in communities where mean intake is greater than 5 g/day.

== Honours ==
In 2013, Yusuf was named an Officer in the Order of Canada. He is also a fellow of the Royal Society of Canada. In 2014, he was awarded the Canada Gairdner Wightman Award and was inducted into the Canadian Medical Hall of Fame. In 2024, Yusuf received an honorary doctorate degree from Oxford University.

== Personal life ==
Yusuf is married to Wahida Yusuf. They have three children, two of which also studied medicine.

== Selected publications ==
- Yusuf, Salim (2018). "Urinary sodium excretion, blood pressure, cardiovascular disease, and mortality: a community-level prospective epidemiological cohort study". The Lancet. 392 (10146): 496–506. doi:10.1016/S0140-6736(18)31376-X.
- Yusuf Salim; Magkos Faidon; Bier Dennis M.; Brenna J. Thomas; de Oliveira Otto Marcia C.; Hill James O.; King Janet C.; Mente Andrew; Ordovas Jose M.; Volek Jeff S.; Astrup Arne (18 August 2020). "Saturated Fats and Health: A Reassessment and Proposal for Food-Based Recommendations". Journal of the American College of Cardiology. 76 (7): 844–857. doi:10.1016/j.jacc.2020.05.077. PMID 32562735.
- Yusuf, Salim; Mente, Andrew; Dehghan, Mahshid (2020). "Diet and health: the need for new and reliable approaches". European Heart Journal. 41 (28): 2641–2644. doi:10.1093/eurheartj/ehaa317.
