= Jimmy Volmink =

South African physician

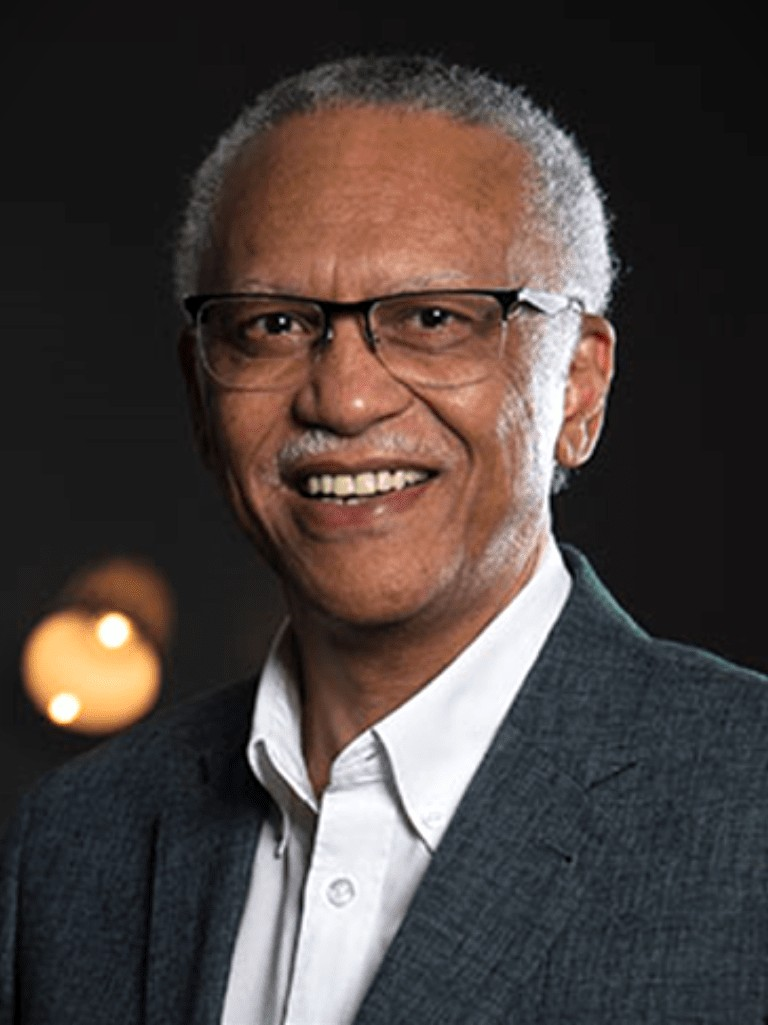
- Official image of Volmink at the Wellcome Trust, 2023
- Born: James Volmink; Cape Town
- Education: University of Cape Town; Harvard University; University of Oxford
- Scientific career
- Workplaces: Stellenbosch University; Wellcome Trust
- Thesis: The Oxford myocardial infarction incidence study (1996)

James Volmink is a South African physician who is a professor and chief executive officer of Equity, Diversity and Inclusion at the Wellcome Trust. He is an advocate for evidence-based medicine and has campaigned to improve healthcare in South Africa. He is a Fellow of the Academy of Science of South Africa and Royal College of Physicians of Edinburgh.

== Early life and education ==
Volmink grew up in Cape Town during apartheid, where he had limited educational opportunities. He went to a segregated township school. He said that his parents believed in him and made him feel that he could do anything he wanted. He applied to study at Stellenbosch University in the 1980s, but was rejected because he was Black. He eventually studied medicine at the University of Cape Town, and started his career as a doctor, working in disadvantaged communities across South Africa. He completed his medical internship in Cape Town, where he became frustrated with the hospital hierarchy system. He applied for a job in rural Switzerland, where he became interested in public health. He returned to Cape Town, where he rotated through hospital positions in Cape Town. He worked at Red Cross War Memorial Children's Hospital and in Mitchells Plain as a family practitioner. He became passionate about being a health practitioner who practised health promotion. Volmink eventually applied for a training position at Stellenbosch University, but also for postgraduate positions overseas. He completed his training in public health at Harvard University, before moving to the University of Oxford on a scholarship. He became aware of the Cochrane group whilst out cycling with his son, where he met Iain Chalmers. He has said that this chance encounter was "a life-changing moment,".

== Research and career ==
Volmink founded Cochrane South Africa, a non-profit that looks to disseminate information of what works in healthcare. He commissioned studies into antiretrovirals, demonstrating that whilst they caused minor adverse effects, they prevented mother-to-child transmission. He campaigned to improve access to antiretrovirals for people in South Africa, and after many attempts to convince government to update their policies, the courts eventually mandated their use. At Cochrane, he coordinated public health summits in South Africa. He campaigned for Cochrane to adopt a global health equity strategy.

Volmink served as Professor and Dean of Medicine at Stellenbosch University. His research considered evidence-based medicine, with a focus on tuberculosis, HIV and cardiovascular disease. He advocated for equity and inclusion, and developed a master's program in clinical epidemiology.

He joined the Wellcome Trust at Chief Equity, Diversity and Inclusion Officer in 2023.

== Awards and honours ==
Volmink was elected to the Academy of Science of South Africa in 2000. He was appointed a Fellow of the Royal College of Physicians of Edinburgh. In 2015, he was awarded the Liverpool School of Tropical Medicine Leverhulme Medal. In 2021 KU Leuven awarded him an honorary doctorate in recognition of his commitment to public health.

== Selected publications ==
- Salla A Munro; Simon A Lewin; Helen J Smith; Mark E Engel; Atle Fretheim; Jimmy Volmink (2007). "Patient adherence to tuberculosis treatment: a systematic review of qualitative research". PLOS Medicine. 4 (7): e238. doi:10.1371/journal.pmed.0040238. PMC 1925126. PMID 17676945. Wikidata Q28469261.
- Salla Atkins; Simon Lewin; Helen Smith; Mark Engel; Atle Fretheim; Jimmy Volmink (2008). "Conducting a meta-ethnography of qualitative literature: lessons learnt". BMC Medical Research Methodology. 8: 21. doi:10.1186/1471-2288-8-21. PMC 2374791. PMID 18416812. Wikidata Q33328653.
- Jimmy Volmink; Sara Woldehanna (2004). "Treatment of latent tuberculosis infection in HIV infected persons". Cochrane Database of Systematic Reviews. doi:10.1002/14651858.cd000171.pub2. PMID 14973947. Wikidata Q24247409.
