= Liesl Zühlke =

South African cardiologist

- Born: 10 April 1968 (age 58); Cape Town, South Africa
- Occupation: Cardiologist
- Awards: Member of the Academy of Science of South Africa

Academic background
- Education: University of Cape Town; London School of Economics
- Thesis: The outcomes of asymptomatic and symptomatic rheumatic heart disease (2015)
- Doctoral advisor: Bongani Mayosi; Mark Engel

Academic work
- Discipline: Cardiology
- Sub-discipline: Paediatric cardiology; Rheumatic heart disease
- Institutions: Red Cross War Memorial Children's Hospital; University of Cape Town

Liesl Johanna Zühlke is the Vice-President of the South African Medical Research Council, Extramural Research and Internal Portfolio. She is a South African paediatric cardiologist who specialises in paediatric and rheumatic heart disease. She works at the Red Cross War Memorial Children's Hospital and Groote Schuur Hospital, and was the first woman in her country to be appointed as a full professor in paediatric cardiology. Her husband, Alexander Zühlke, is a plastic surgeon, and they have two sons, Gabriel and Eli.

== Biography ==
She was born on 10 April 1968 in Cape Town. She was educated at the University of Cape Town (UCT) Medical School, where she received her Bachelor of Medicine, Bachelor of Surgery in 1991, her Master of Public Health in 2011, and her PhD in 2015; her PhD dissertation, supervised by Bongani Mayosi and Mark Engel, was titled The outcomes of asymptomatic and symptomatic rheumatic heart disease. She received her Master of Science in Health Economics, Outcomes and Management in Cardiovascular Sciences at the London School of Economics in 2018, having received a grant from the European Society of Cardiology to do so.

After working as a senior registrar at Red Cross War Memorial Children's Hospital Department of Paediatrics and Child Health (2000–2002; 2006–2007) and abroad at University Hospital of Düsseldorf (2004–2006), she was promoted to senior specialist in paediatric cardiology (2007–2008), before serving as Clinical Coordinator and Researcher of the Stop Rheumatic Heart Disease A.S.A.P. Programme (2008–2016). After working as a senior research officer and postdoctoral fellow at UCT (2015–2016), she returned to Red Cross War Memorial as a paediatric cardiologist and, from 2021 to 2022, was Acting Deputy-Dean for Research at UCT's Faculty of Health Sciences.

As an academic, she specialises in paediatric and rheumatic heart disease. She was the first South Africa's woman to be appointed as a full professor in paediatric cardiology. Additionally, her research topics include the epidemiology and medical genetics of heart disease, heart disease in youth and young women, and heart disease associated with HIV and COVID-19. In 2015, she founded the Children's Heart Disease Research Unit (CHDRU) at the University of Cape Town, with the goal of advancing paediatric and congenital cardiology research across Africa, strengthening implementation science, and mentoring African researchers and clinicians.

She was the winner of the UK Medical Research Council and Department for International Development's 2018 African Research Leader Award. Her recent research extends to large-scale registry and implementation work in rheumatic heart disease. For example, she contributed to the multinational REMEDY study of over 3 000 patients in 12 African countries, India and Yemen, which highlighted the burden, complications and care gaps in RHD.

Leadership and Global Health Advocacy

In 2012, she became president of the Paediatric Cardiac Society of South Africa, serving until 2016; from that year until 2018, she served as president of the South African Heart Association. She was the first woman of colour elected to either position.

She is a member of the Academy of Science of South Africa. She is also Fellow of the College of Paediatricians of South Africa (1999), Fellow of the European Society of Cardiology (2015), Fellow of the American College of Cardiology (2016), and Fellow of The World Academy of Sciences. Prof Zühlke has achieved the highest leadership positions within cardiology in South Africa; as President of the Paediatric Cardiac Society of South Africa (2012-2016), President of the South African Heart Association (2016-2018) and currently chair of both the Paediatric and Rheumatic Heart Disease Taskforces in the Pan-African Society of Cardiology. Internationally she is the President of Reach (Rheumatic Heart Disease, Evidence, Advocacy, Communication and Hope) since 2018. She is a board member of the World Heart Federation and NCDA- Non-Communicable Diseases Alliance, a member of the International scientific advisory board of Children's Heart Link and Global ARCH and an executive member of SAVAC (Strep A Vaccine Global Consortium). Zühlke currently holds the position of Vice-President for Extramural Research and Internal Portfolio at the South African Medical Research Council (SAMRC).

Community Outreach and public Engagement

Beyond her academic and clinical work, Zühlke has engaged in public health advocacy. She led the development of a national paediatric COVID-19/MIS-C biorepository and research platform in South Africa to ensure representation of African children in global studies on the syndrome. In 2023, she co-authored a protocol for a national systematic review of rheumatic heart disease burden and care barriers in South Africa, reflecting her ongoing commitment to research translation into policy. She is also regularly consulted by civil society (laypeople, parents and support groups), private and governmental organisations regarding congenital and rheumatic heart disease. In 2021, Zühlke participated in the "Conversations from the Heart" podcast by the World Heart Federation, highlighting her global health leadership in cardiovascular disease in children and young adults.
