= Jeff Volek =

American kinesiologist

- Occupation: Kinesiologist

Jeff S. Volek is an American kinesiologist and low-carbohydrate diet advocate who focuses on the clinical application of ketogenic diets. He is the co-founder of Virta Health and was a review author for the evidentiary foundation of the 2025 Dietary Guidelines for Americans.

== Career ==
Volek obtained a MSc in Exercise Physiology in 1995 and PhD in Kinesiology from Pennsylvania State University in 1999. He is a registered dietitian.

Volek is a professor in the Department of Human Sciences at Ohio State University. He has obtained over $7 million in research grants to study the health outcomes of low-carbohydrate diets. He co-founded Virta Health Corp and is Chief Science Officer. As of 2023, Volek is investigating the use of ketogenic diets in brain metastases.

Volek is on the advisory board of Atkins-HCP (owned by Atkins Nutritionals) and co-authored a book promoting a modified version of the Atkins diet. Volek promotes a diet high in saturated fat and has disputed the saturated fat guidelines.

Volek's book The Art and Science of Low Carbohydrate Living, co-authored with Stephen D. Phinney received an overall score of 74% by Red Pen Reviews, including a score of 63% for scientific accuracy. The review concluded that "we think Art and Science could be a useful book for people interested in low-carb diets, but they may want to view its scientific claims with some caution."

== 2025-2030 Dietary Guidelines for Americans ==
Volek was a review author of The Scientific Foundation For The Dietary Guidelines For Americans which was used as the evidentiary foundation for the 2025 Dietary Guidelines for Americans. Volek was referred to 10 times in the review. Almost half of Volek’s studies cited in the review were funded by his company Virta Health, a weight loss coaching company that advocates for low-carb and low-sugar diets.

== Funding ==
Volek has received funding from the Dutch Dairy Association, Dairy Management Inc. and the Malaysian Palm Oil Board.

== Selected publications ==
- The Testosterone Advantage Plan (with Adam Campbell and Lou Schuler, 2002)
- Men's Health TNT Diet (with Adam Campbell, 2008)
- New Atkins For a New You (with Eric C. Westman and Stephen D. Phinney, 2010)
- The Art and Science of Low Carbohydrate Living (with Stephen D. Phinney, 2011)
- The Art and Science of Low Carbohydrate Performance (with Stephen D. Phinney, 2012)
- "The Scientific Foundation For The Dietary Guidelines For Americans" (PDF). U.S. Department of Health and Human Services. 2026.
