= British Heart Foundation =

United Kingdom charity

- Abbreviation: BHF
- Formation: 1961
- Legal status: Registered charity
- Purpose: Heart and circulatory diseases and their risk factors
- Location: Hampstead Road, London, NW1
- Coordinates: 51.533729°N 0.139671°W
- Region served: United Kingdom
- Patron: King Charles III
- Chairwoman: Karen A. Frank
- Chief Executive: Dr Charmaine Griffiths
- Chief Scientific and Medical Officer: Professor Bryan Williams OBE
- Website: bhf.org.uk

The British Heart Foundation (BHF) is a cardiovascular research charity in the United Kingdom. It funds medical research related to heart and circulatory diseases and their risk factors, and runs influencing work aimed at shaping public policy and raising awareness.

In 2021, a study conducted by YouGov ranked the British Heart Foundation as the top charity or organisation in the UK by per cent of adults who hold a positive opinion of the organisation.

== Foundation ==
The British Heart Foundation was founded in 1961 by a group of medical professionals who were concerned about the increasing death rate from cardiovascular disease. They wanted to fund extra research into the causes, diagnosis, treatment, and prevention of heart and circulatory diseases.

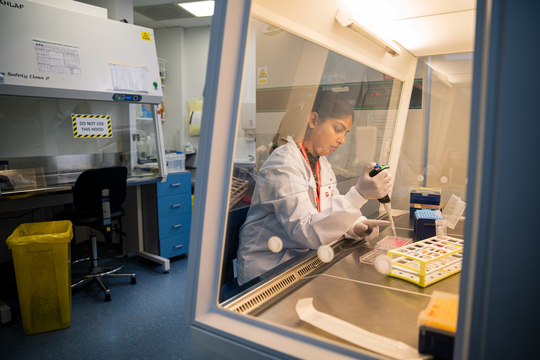
BHF-funded clinical research

== Leadership ==
Dr Charmaine Griffiths has been the BHF's Chief Executive since February 2020, succeeding Simon Gillespie OBE. Professor Bryan Williams OBE became the charity's first Chief Scientific and Medical Officer (CSMO) in December 2023, after Professor Sir Nilesh Samani stood down as Medical Director after more than 7 years in the role.

The BHF's Board of Trustees is made up of up to 14 Trustees, and is a mix of medically-qualified and lay members:

- Mark Ashton-Rigby
- David Boynton
- Dr Sarah Clarke
- Roisin Donnelly
- Professor Sadaf Farooqi
- Mark Fitzpatrick
- Karen A. Frank
- Timothy Howe KC
- Dr Annalisa Jenkins
- Professor David Lomas
- Sharron Pamplin
- Professor Sir Munir Pirmohamed
- Professor Brian Walker

Karen A. Frank is the Chair of the Board of Trustees.

King Charles III has been the BHF's Patron since May 2024, succeeding Prince Philip, Duke of Edinburgh.

== Activities ==
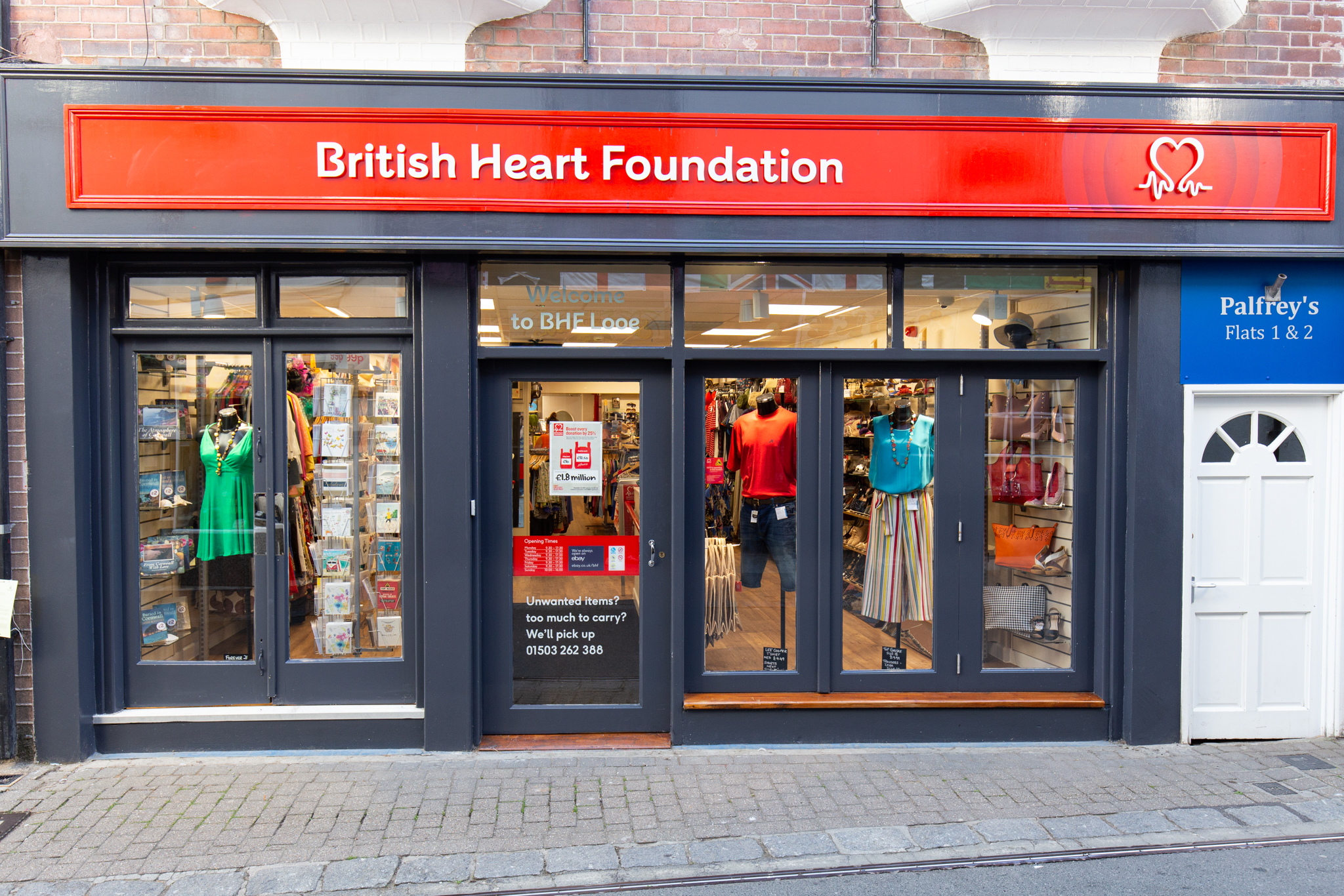
British Heart Foundation shop, Looe, Cornwall

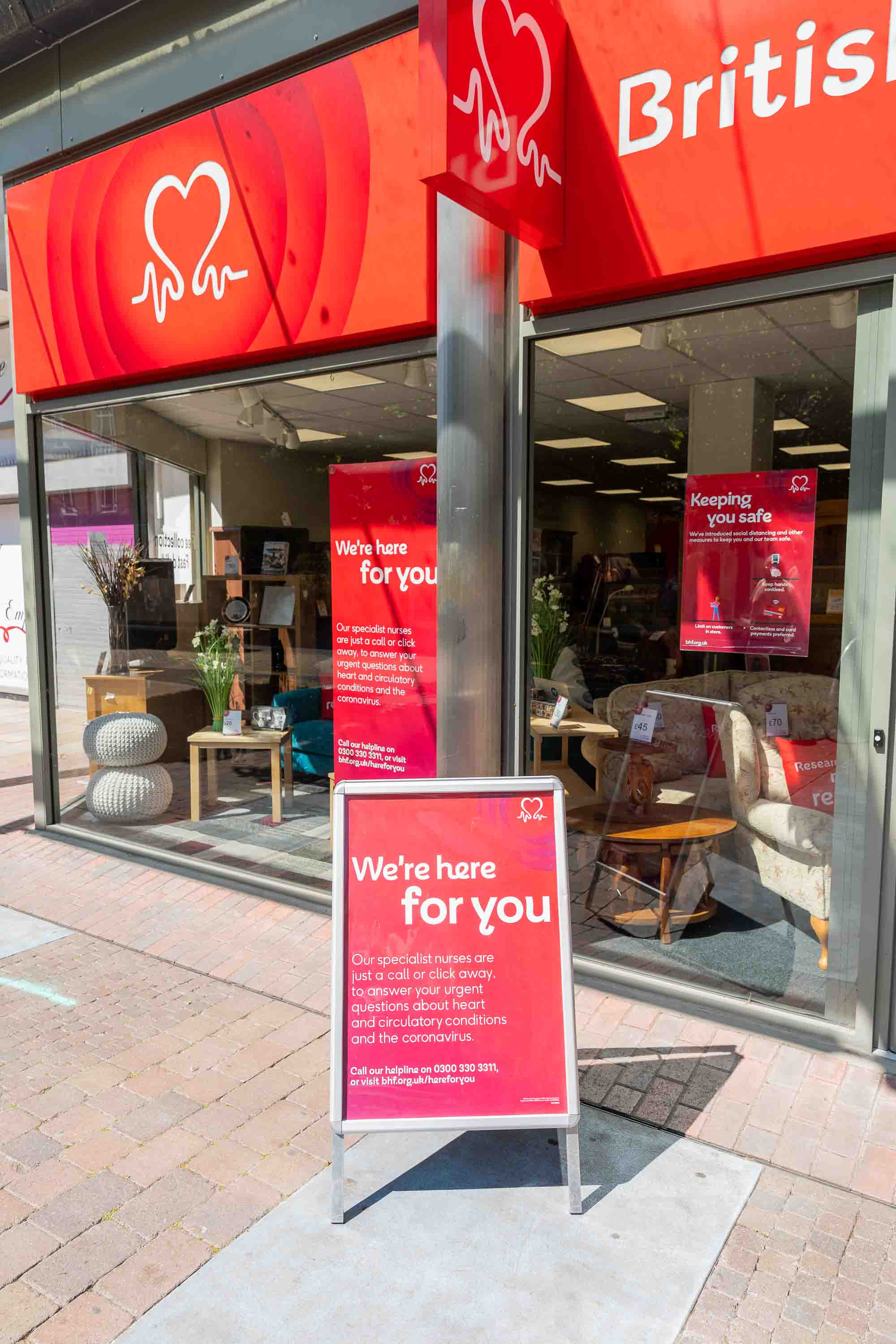
British Heart Foundation store, Hammersmith, London

The British Heart Foundation's main focus is to fund cardiovascular research, aiming to spend around £100 million a year funding scientists around the UK. They are currently funding over 1000 research projects.

=== Centres of Research Excellence ===
Since 2008 the BHF has been investing in Centres of Research Excellence. The eight current centres bring together scientists from a number of disciplines to work on research projects to beat heart and circulatory disease. The current Centres of Research are:

- University of Cambridge
- University College London
- University of Edinburgh
- Imperial College London
- King's College London
- University of Leicester
- University of Oxford
- University of Manchester

=== Animal research ===
The BHF has also funded animal research. In June 2011, Animal Aid targeted BHF and several other health charities in a series of newspaper advertisements urging the public not to donate to the organizations under the pretence of funding experiments on animals. The pressure group argued that 100 dogs had died since 1988 during the experiments. The BHF said it funds animal research only after grant applications have gone through an independent peer review and follows the three Rs principles when considering such grants.

=== Centres of Regenerative Medicine ===
In 2013 the BHF committed to funding three multi-institution Centres of Regenerative Medicine, investing £7.5 million over four years to fund scientists looking for new treatments for heart failure.

=== BHF Clinical Research Collaborative ===
The British Heart Foundation Clinical Research Collaborative was launched in 2019, hosted by the British Cardiovascular Society. Designed to support the planning of high-quality national cardiovascular research, it brings together professional societies, research groups and patient and public involvement to better coordinate and prioritise research efforts. It also launched a fund to support the development of clinical research in cardiovascular disease, providing grants from £5,000-20,000, and all topic ideas will be considered.

Other patients and public activities include:

- Information – BHF provides information to help the public reduce their own heart health risk. It also provides numerous resources for patients to better manage their conditions, including the Heart Matters magazine and online hubs on risk factors such as blood pressure and obesity.
- Campaigning – BHF influences government to establish policies that minimise the risk of developing heart and circulatory disease, including the funding of reports and research
- Support – offering advice to those with heart conditions via their website, information booklets or heart helpline.
- Life saving skills – the BHF currently offers free CPR kits to schools and is working with the Department of Health to distribute defibrillators throughout England.

In 2020, The British Heart Foundation had a net income of just over £107m. In the same year, the BHF spent over £93m on funding cardiovascular research.

=== The Global Cardiovascular Research Funders Forum ===
The charity announced, in June 2021, that it had joined forces with leading cardiovascular research funders around the world to form the Global Cardiovascular Research Funders Forum (GCRFF). In addition to the British Heart Foundation, the Forum's members are:

- The American Heart Association
- Hjerteforeningen (The Danish Heart Foundation)
- Nederlandse Hartstichting (The Dutch Heart Foundation)
- Schweizerische Herzstiftung (The Swiss Heart Foundation)
- Deutsches Zentrum für Herz-Kreislauf-Forschung (German Centre for Cardiovascular Research: DZHK)
- The Leducq Foundation
- The Heart and Stroke Foundation of Canada
- The Canadian Institutes of Health Research
- The National Heart Foundation of Australia
- The National Heart Foundation of New Zealand
- The National Heart, Lung, and Blood Institute (NHLBI)

=== The Big Beat Challenge ===
In 2019, The British Heart Foundation launched the Big Beat Challenge, a global competition with a single award of £30m for the research team who proposed a transformational solution to any cardiovascular disease. The Big Beat Challenge was open to applications from any country globally, and accepted proposals in any research area related to cardiovascular disease. Based on a panel of BHF research-funding committee members and an International Advisory panel, a shortlist was finalised in January 2020 to include a robotic heart, a 'Google map' of atherosclerosis, a project harnessing artificial intelligence (AI) and wearables to create a cardiovascular digital twin of a patient, and a genetic cure for inherited heart conditions.

CureHeart, led by co-PIs Professor Hugh Christian Watkins and Professor Christine Seidman, which aims to find a cure for genetic cardiomyopathies, was announced as the winner of the Big Beat Challenge in July 2022.

=== Fundraising ===
BHF fundraising events accounted for nearly £54m of income in 2019-20.

The BHF won the bid to be named as the London Marathon charity partner for the 2022 raise, aiming to raise £3m through the partnership to invest in clinical research.

The annual London to Brighton Bike Ride is a flagship fundraising event, with over 16,000 cyclists and raising over £2.8m. The event was cancelled in 2020 and 2021, and was expected to return in 2022 with PureGym as the sponsor.

==== Wealth screening ====
In 2016, the BHF was fined by the UK Information Commissioner's Office after finding that it had breached data protection legislation by using external bodies to analyse supporters' financial status for fundraising purpose, a practice known as 'wealth screening'. BBC News Online reported that, "Information Commissioner Elizabeth Denham said donors had not been informed of the charity's practices, and were therefore unable to consent or object to them." She suggested other charities could also be engaged in similar activities.

The BHF disputed the decision, stating that "The ICO's conclusions were 'wrong, disproportionate and inconsistent […] We find the decision surprising, as earlier this year in June the ICO praised our data handling. Our trustees will therefore consider whether it's in the interests of our supporters and beneficiaries to challenge this decision."

=== Retail division ===
The BHF runs the largest network of charity shops in the UK, and generates income through online sales too.

The BHF Retail division made roughly £30 million every year. They had had 470 clothing shops and 181 home stores in the year to March 2026. In 2025/6 it made a net loss of £3.3 million because of “rising operating costs and changing customer habits”.

In June 2026, the charity announced it planned to close up to 150 stores in the UK by 2028.

== Facts and figures ==
- Since the BHF was established, the annual number of deaths from heart and circulatory diseases in the UK has fallen by around half.
- Heart and circulatory diseases cause a quarter of all deaths in the UK, totally around 160,000 deaths.
- Around 1.4 million people alive in the UK in 2021 have survived a heart attack.
- Since 1961, the UK death rate from heart and circulatory diseases has declined by over three quarters.
- Healthcare costs relating to heart and circulatory diseases are estimated at £9 billion each year.
- Over 3,800 Heartstart UK schemes to educate people what to do in various emergency situations (not just cardiac emergencies). More than 3.5 million people have been trained by Heartstart UK in schools (for example via the Saving Londoners' Lives project) and the community.
- Every year, 1 in every 145 babies are born in the UK with a congenital heart defect.

== See also ==
- American Heart Association
- Heart and Stroke Foundation of Canada
- Heart Disease Research Foundation
- National Heart Foundation of Australia
- United OneHeart Foundation
- Heart Protection Study
