= Lou Schuler =

- Born: January 23, 1957 (age 69); St. Louis, Missouri
- Occupation: Fitness Editor - Men's Fitness Fitness Director - Men’s Health
- Writing career
- Occupations: Journalist and Author
- Genre: Non-fiction
- Subjects: Physical Fitness, Weightlifting
- Website: malepatternfitness.com; www.louschulerwriting.com

Lou Schuler (born January 23, 1957, in St. Louis, Missouri) is a fitness journalist and author or coauthor of several books on men's health and exercise. In 2004 he won a National Magazine Award for Death by Exercise.

Schuler is currently the editorial director for the Personal Trainer Development Center. He is the former fitness editor of Men's Fitness magazine, the former fitness director of Men’s Health, the former editorial director of the online publication Testosterone Muscle (also known as T-Nation), and is certified as a strength and conditioning specialist (CSCS) by the National Strength and Conditioning Association.

Schuler participated in JP Fitness Summit 2007 and Staley Training Systems Annual Training Summit 2006, on both occasions presenting lectures on the way of becoming a successful sports writer.

== Early life ==
Schuler spent his college life lifeguarding.

== Books ==
- Schuler, Lou; Michael Mejia (2002-11-09). Men's Health Home Workout Bible. Rodale Books. p. 434. ISBN 1-57954-657-9.
- Schuler, Lou (2002-06-15). The Men's Health Belly-Off Program: Discover How 80,000 Guys Lost Their Guts...And How You Can Too. The Editors of Men's Health. Rodale Books. p. 224. ISBN 1-57954-606-4.
- Schuler, Lou (2003-01-03). The Testosterone Advantage Plan. Rodale International Ltd. p. 336. ISBN 1-4050-0669-2.
- Schuler, Lou; Ian King (2003-10-17). Men's Health: The Book of Muscle--The World's Most Authoritative Guide to Building Your Body. Rodale Books. p. 364. ISBN 1-57954-769-9.
- Schuler, Lou; Alwyn Cosgrove (2005-12-29). New Rules of Lifting: Six Basic Moves for Maximum Muscle. Avery. p. 320. ISBN 1-58333-238-3.
- Schuler, Lou; Cassandra Forsythe; Alwyn Cosgrove (2007-12-27). New Rules of Lifting for Women: Lift Like a Man, Look Like a Goddess. Avery. p. 272. ISBN 978-1-58333-294-8.
- Schuler, Lou; Alwyn Cosgrove (2010-12-30). The New Rules of Lifting for Abs: A Myth-Busting Fitness Plan for Men and Women Who Want a Strong Core and a Pain-Free Back. Avery. p. 304. ISBN 978-1-58333-413-3.
- Schuler, Lou; Alwyn Cosgrove (2012-04-26). The New Rules of Lifting For Life: An All-New Muscle-Building, Fat-Blasting Plan for Men and Women Who Want to Ace Their Midlife Exams. Avery. p. 320. ISBN 978-1-58333-461-4.
- Schuler, Lou; Alwyn Cosgrove (2012-12-27). The New Rules of Lifting Supercharged: Ten All-New Muscle-Building Programs for Men and Women. Avery. p. 368. ISBN 978-1-58333-465-2.
- Schuler, Lou; Alan Aragon (2014-12-23). The Lean Muscle Diet: A Customized Nutrition and Workout Plan. Rodale Books. p. 320. ISBN 978-1-62336-418-2.
