= Red Cross War Memorial Children's Hospital =

- Western Cape Department of Health
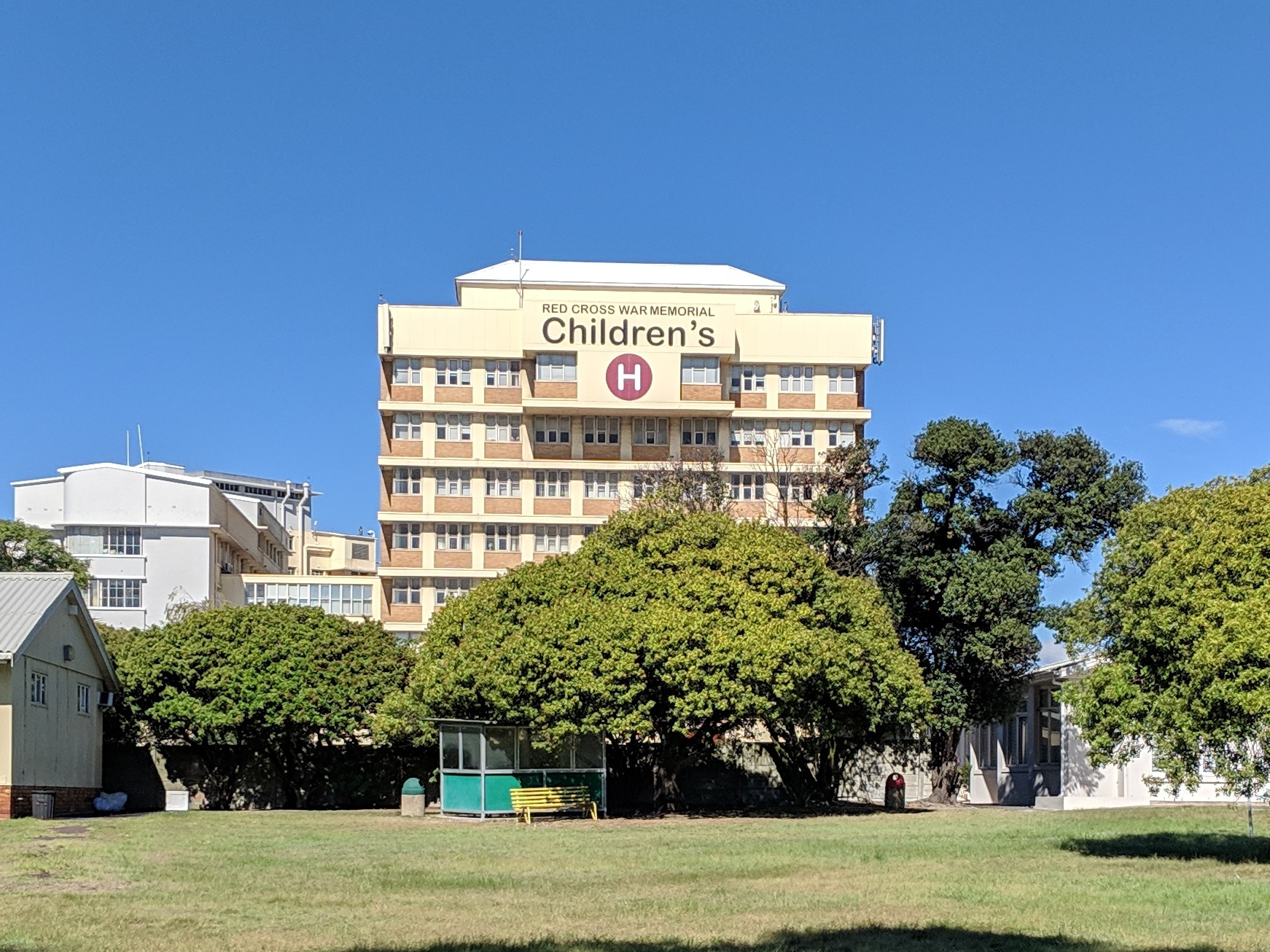

- Shown in Cape Town

Geography
- Location: Rondebosch, Cape Town, Western Cape, South Africa
- Coordinates: 33°57′14″S 18°29′17″E

Organisation
- Care system: Department of Health
- Type: Specialist
- Affiliated university: University of Cape Town, University of the Western Cape, Stellenbosch University

Services
- Beds: 300
- Speciality: Paediatrics

History
- Founded: 1956

Links
- Website: www.westerncape.gov.za/redcrosshospital
- Lists: Hospitals in South Africa

Red Cross War Memorial Children's Hospital in Cape Town, South Africa was opened in 1956 through public subscription as a memorial to soldiers lost in the Second World War. The suggestion that the memorial take the form of a children's hospital was proposed by Vyvyan U.T. Watson. Mr Watson, a prominent businessman, had lost his first born and only son, Peter Tennant Watson, at about four years old, to an outbreak of diphtheria in Cape Town. Mr Watson was a major force in steering the organization of the building of the hospital. The Peter Pan statue on the hospital grounds, sculpted by Ivan Mitford-Barberton, was donated by Mr Watson and his wife, Gwendolyn. Mr Watson was later President of the South African Red Cross Society. It is one of two dedicated children's public hospitals in sub-Saharan Africa, and one of only a few dedicated children's hospitals in the Southern hemisphere.

The hospital has academic links to the University of Cape Town's School of Child and Adolescent Health, the University of the Western Cape Dental School and the University of Stellenbosch; it is regarded as South Africa's leading centre for post-graduate specialist paediatric medical and surgical training.
