= Heart and Stroke Foundation of Canada =

Canadian charity dedicated to heart disease and stroke

Heart & Stroke
- Formation: 1952; 74 years ago
- Founded: 1952
- Type: Non-profit organization
- Registration no.: 10684-6942 RR0001
- Legal status: Charitable organization
- Purpose: Heart disease and stroke
- Headquarters: Ottawa, Ontario, Canada
- Key people: Doug Roth, CEO
- Website: www.heartandstroke.ca
- Formerly called: Heart and Stroke Foundation of Canada (1952–2016)

Former logo, used until 2016

The Heart and Stroke Foundation of Canada is a Canadian charity dedicated to advocacy, education, and the funding of research surrounding heart disease and stroke.

== Nomenclature ==
In November 2016, the organization re-branded as Heart & Stroke and introduced a new logo; the new branding is meant to signify a more "personal" approach to its marketing, with a wider targeting of younger demographics and immigrants.

== Activities ==
Heart and Stroke works with medical doctors and healthcare institutions to reduce mortality from cardiovascular events. Key institutional stakeholders include provincial ministries of health, hospital associations, and healthcare institutes. They have collaborated with the Canadian Stroke Society and the Health Canada Laboratory Centre for Disease Control to create the Stroke System Coalition.

Heart and Stroke fund and take part in research and fund publications of research that addresses the way in which women and other demographic groups are particularly affected by cardiovascular incidents.

=== Publications ===
In early February 2018, the organization released Ms Understood, a report about how women's early warning signs of a heart attack are frequently missed.

=== Fundraising ===
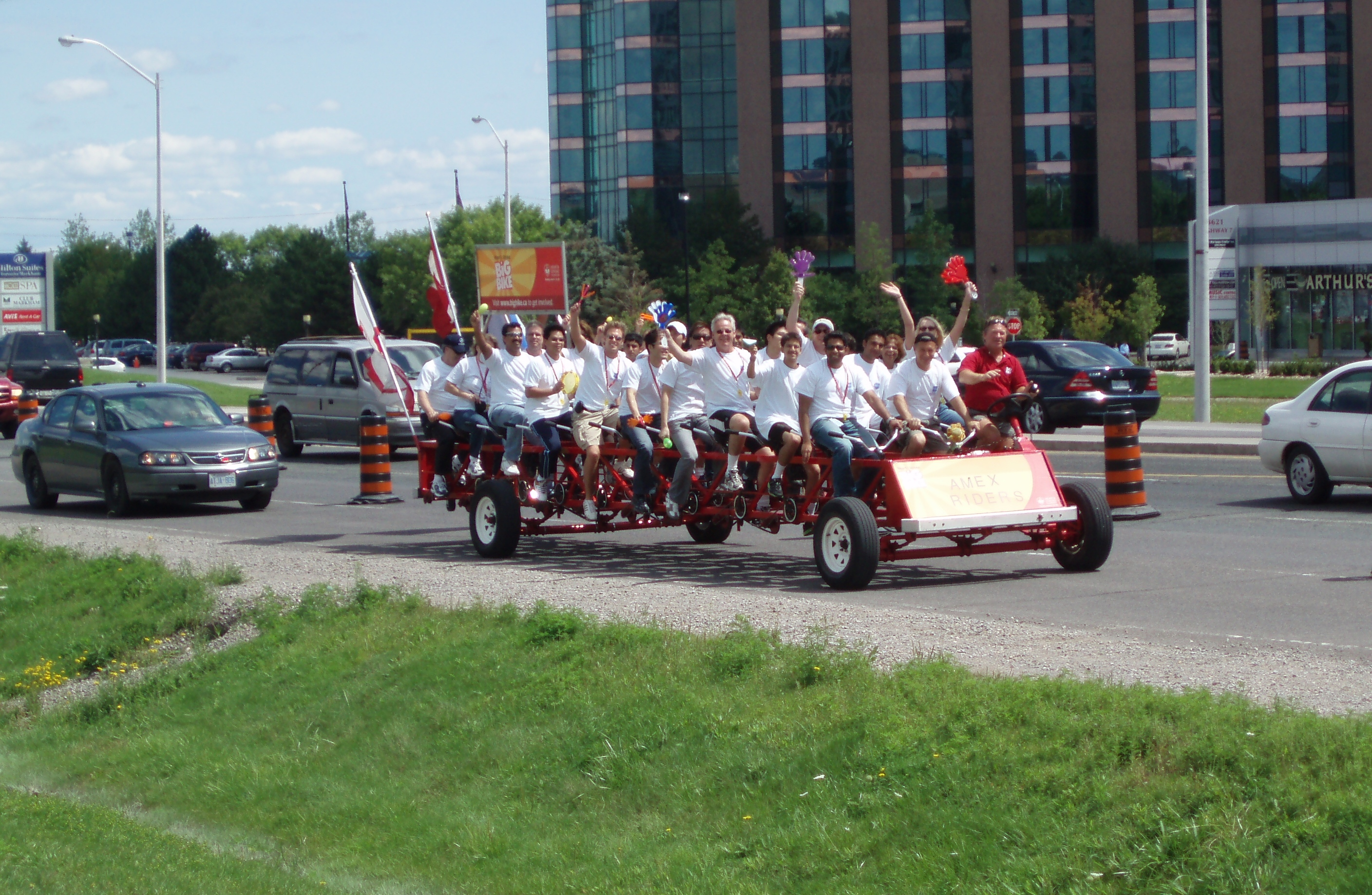
Heart and Stroke Foundation's fundraising "Big Bike"

Heart and Stroke operates a number of fundraising events, including the "Big Bike" event, in which 29 riders power one big red bike for twenty minutes. "Jump Rope for Heart" is an elementary school-based fundraising initiative involving physical activities centered around skipping. Jump Rope for Heart celebrated its 35th anniversary in 2017, with close to 4,000 schools participating across Canada. Heart and Stroke's "Ride for Heart" is an annual summer running and cycling event based in Toronto, Ontario, taking place on part of the Gardiner Expressway and Don Valley Parkway, both of which are closed for the event. In 2017, Ride for Heart celebrated its 30th anniversary with 15,000 riders and 5,000 runners and walkers. Its title sponsor is Manulife Financial. In 2018, Toronto city councilor Stephen Holyday requested that the event be moved to inner city streets rather than Gardiner Expressway, to ease traffic congestion. Proceeds from Heart & Stroke's annual lottery goes toward supporting grants for research at teaching hospitals and universities across the province of Ontario.

== Dietary advice ==
The Heart and Stroke Foundation of Canada advices people to reduce intake of saturated fat and replace saturated fats with monounsaturated and polyunsaturated fats to reduce LDL-cholesterol. They recommend a healthy diet consisting of fruit, legumes, vegetables, whole grains, low-fat dairy products, dairy alternatives, fish and poultry. They also recommend a limit on processed food such as processed meats and sweetened beverages.
