= South African Medical Research Council =

Medical research organization in South Africa

Agency overview
- Formed: 1969; 57 years ago
- Jurisdiction: South Africa
- Employees: ≈ 718
- Annual budget: R1.222 billion (2022/23)
- Agency executive: Professor Ntobeko Ntusi, President and CEO
- Parent department: Department of Health
- Key document: South African Medical Research Council Act 58, 1991
- Website: www.samrc.ac.za

The South African Medical Research Council (SAMRC) is a para-statal medical research organisation in South Africa. The current president is professor Ntobeko Ntusi. The South African Medical Research Council was established in 1969 to act as an independent statutory body to co-ordinate health and medical research activities throughout South Africa.

The SAMRC strives to “advance the nation’s health and quality of life and address inequity by conducting and funding relevant and responsive health research, capacity development, innovation, and research translation”.

Research conducted by the SAMRC is in the fields of tuberculosis, HIV/AIDS, cardiovascular diseases, non-communicable diseases, gender and health, alcohol abuse, and drug abuse.

It is a member of the Innovative Vector Control Consortium.
